= 1909 Alberta general election =

- March 22, 1909

41 seats in the Legislative Assembly of Alberta 21 seats were needed for a majority
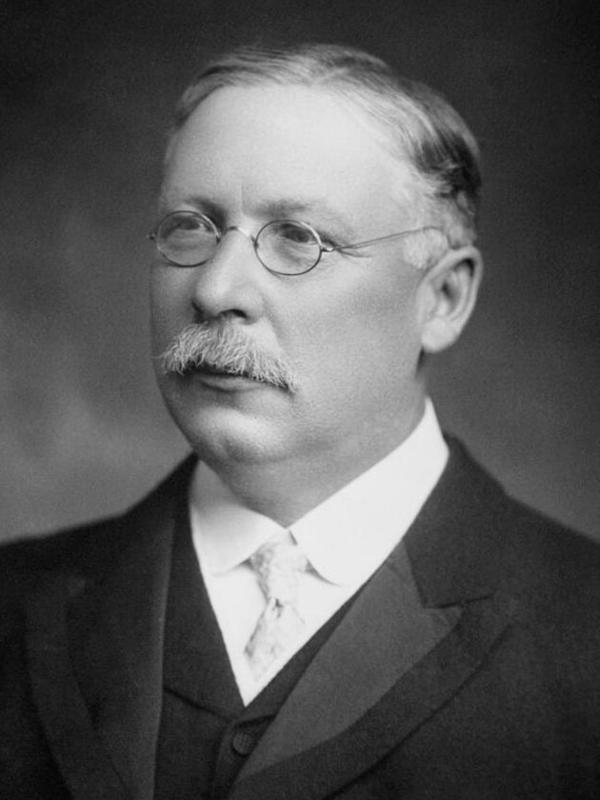

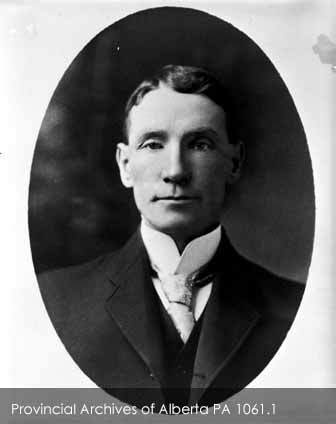
	Majority party	Minority party
Leader	Alexander Rutherford	Albert Robertson
Party	Liberal	Conservative
Leader since	1905	1905
Leader's seat	Strathcona	ran in High River
Last election	23 seats, 57.56%	2 seats, 37.13%
Seats before	22	2
Seats won	36	2
Seat change	▲14	0
Popular vote	29,634	15,848
Percentage	59.26%	31.69%
Swing	▲1.70%	▼5.44%
	Third party	Fourth party
	S	L
Leader	unknown	Donald McNabb
Party	Socialist	Labour
Leader since	—	1909
Leader's seat	—	ran in Lethbridge City (lost)
Last election	pre-creation	pre-creation
Seats before	0	1
Seats won	1	0
Seat change	▲1	▼1
Popular vote	1,302	214
Percentage	2.60%	0.43%
Swing	▲2.60%	▲0.43%
Premier before election
Alexander C. Rutherford
Liberal
Premier after election
Alexander C. Rutherford
Liberal

The 1909 Alberta general election was the second general election held in the province of Alberta, Canada. It took place on March 22, 1909, to elect 41 members to the 2nd Alberta Legislature. The incumbent Liberal Party led by Premier Alexander C. Rutherford achieved a re-election victory, securing a majority government by winning 36 out of the 41 seats in the legislature with more than 59 per cent of the popular vote. The Conservative Party led by Albert Robertson once again formed the official opposition, with only two members, and Robertson himself was defeated in his own seat in High River. The remaining three seats were divided among smaller parties and independent candidates.

Prior to the election, the Legislative Assembly passed An Act respecting the Legislative Assembly of Alberta in February 1909 which created an additional 16 seats in the Legislature, expanding from 25 members to a total of 41, and redistributed the boundaries of the provincial electoral districts. As part of the redistricting process, the Crowsnest Pass region was separated from the Pincher Creek electoral district and established as its own district named Rocky Mountain. This new district had a significant population of coal miners, which was reflected in the election outcome with the election of a Socialist candidate. Due to the increased population and growth of Edmonton and Calgary, each city was granted an additional seat in the legislature. As a result, multi-seat districts were established in these cities, allowing voters to cast up to two votes using the block voting system. In Edmonton, two Liberal candidates were elected to represent the two seats, while in Calgary, one Liberal and one Conservative candidate emerged victorious. This marked the first instance in Alberta's political history where multiple-seat districts were used and mixed representation, with members from different parties, were elected in a district. (Each election from here until 1955 would have at least one multiple-seat district.)

The election in the Athabasca electoral district was conducted on July 15, 1909, due to the remoteness of the riding.

Despite the election being an overwhelming success for the Liberal government of Premier Rutherford, his administration was embroiled with the Alberta and Great Waterways Railway scandal shortly after the election. The scandal divided the Liberal Party and forced Rutherford to resign in 1910. Arthur Sifton, Alberta's chief justice was selected as the second Premier of Alberta in an effort to restore party unity.

== Background ==
=== 1905 general election ===
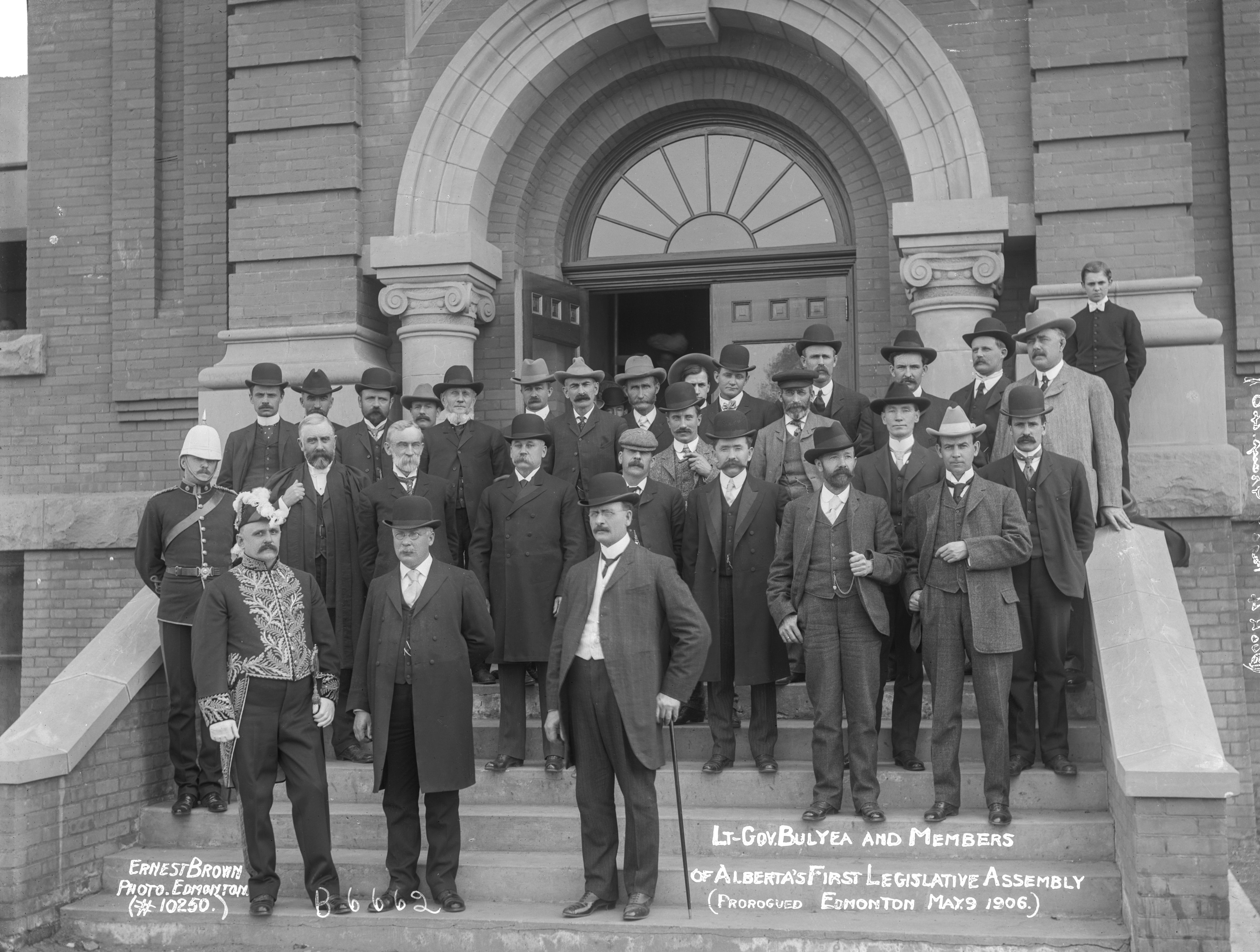
Members of the first Legislative Assembly of Alberta, taken in 1906.

The 1905 Alberta general election as a fiercely contested battle between the formidable Liberal machine led by Rutherford and the less organized Conservative Party under R. B. Bennett. The Liberals had the advantage of incumbency, as Rutherford had been appointed as the first Premier, and their superior organizing ability. These factors contributed to a resounding victory for the Liberals, who won 22 out of the 25 seats in the Legislature. In contrast, the Conservative Party only managed to win two seats.

Historian Lewis Thomas argues that the overwhelming Liberal triumph can be attributed to their incumbent status. The Liberal government, in its two months of power, had not faced any scandals or policy failures, making it difficult for the opposition to effectively criticize and challenge them. Additionally, the Liberals were able to leverage their control over the machinery of government, both at the provincial and federal levels. Thomas notes that there are a few surviving written suggestions of Liberal appointments, indicating their effective exercise of patronage powers. Furthermore, Thomas argues that the Conservative Party's strong positions on issues such as provincial control over the school system and public lands did not resonate significantly with the voters. The Conservatives attributed their defeat to the Roman Catholic vote, which was perceived to be sympathetic to Wilfrid Laurier due to his support for separate schools. Bennett himself believed that his loss in Calgary by a margin of 37 votes to William Henry Cushing was influenced by Roman Catholic interests, the labor vote, and his absence from the district during campaigning. Consequently, Bennett promptly resigned as leader and temporarily withdrew from politics.

=== By-elections ===
During the first session of the Alberta Legislature, four by-elections were held, with three taking place in 1906. In each of these by-elections, the incumbent Liberal party managed to retain the seats. The first by-election occurred in Lethbridge after Liberal Leverett George DeVeber's appointment to the Senate of Canada on March 8, 1906. Liberal candidate William Simmons emerged victorious with 43.9 per cent of the vote, defeating Labour candidate Frank Henry Sherman who received 37.4 per cent, and Conservative candidate A. E. Keffer who secured 18.7 per cent of the vote. Following the appointment of Matthew McCauley, the Vermilion representative, as the Warden of the Edmonton Penitentiary, Liberal James Bismark Holden was acclaimed as his successor on July 16, 1906. Similarly, when Charles Stuart, the Gleichen representative, was appointed to the Supreme Court of the Northwest Territories in October 1906, a by-election was held, resulting in Liberal candidate Ezra Riley securing 56.3 per cent of the vote and defeating Conservative candidate William L. Walsh.

A significant surprise occurred in the 1909 by-election in Lethbridge when William Simmons resigned to run in the 1908 Canadian federal election in Medicine Hat. Labour candidate Donald McNabb was acclaimed as the representative for Lethbridge on January 8, 1909, becoming Alberta's first Labour representative.

The 1st Alberta Legislature was dissolved and the election writ was dropped on March 22, 1909.

== Election ==
=== Electoral boundaries ===
The boundaries of the electoral districts for the first Alberta general election in 1905 were determined by the Alberta Act and became a subject of controversy. Accusations of gerrymandering in favour of the Liberal Party and northern Alberta arose, (Note: During the debates in Parliament, it was generally agreed upon that the dividing line of northern and southern Alberta was township 38 of the Alberta Township System. Township 38 includes the City of Red Deer, Alberta.) with Calgary-based newspapers such as the Calgary Herald, Calgary Albertan, and Eye-Opener claiming that the borders provided preferential treatment to Edmonton and northern Alberta. Prime Minister Laurier had received assurances from Alberta Members of Parliament Peter Talbot and Frank Oliver that the distribution was fair.

The question of whether there was population-based gerrymandering elicits different responses. Historian Lewis Thomas points out that the final layout favoured northern Alberta with an additional district, even though Oliver and Talbot were aware that more than 1,000 additional voters south of the Red Deer River had participated in the 1904 federal election. Alexander Bruce Kilpatrick notes that the census results from 1906 indicate that if the 38th township is chosen as the dividing line (City of Red Deer), there were 93,601 people in northern Alberta and 87,381 in southern Alberta, with an additional 4,430 residing in the 38th township. Kilpatrick argues that there was a misconception regarding the population distribution in the Strathcona census district, with the assumption that most people lived south of the 38th Township, when in fact a significant majority lived north of it. However, Kilpatrick describes the layout of the electoral districts as a "blatant manipulation of the electoral map to suit a particular purpose." He claims that Oliver designed the constituencies to maximize the influence of Edmonton, with the borders not aligning with the previous constituencies from the North-West Territories Assembly, and instead, they were drawn to have several ridings bordering the city. Meanwhile, Calgary did not have the same advantages in design and went from having two seats in the North-west Territories Assembly to one in the new Alberta Legislature.

It was not until the fourth and final session of the 1st Alberta Legislature that changes to provincial elections procedures and electoral districts were addressed. The government introduced the Act respecting the Legislative Assembly of Alberta, which significantly altered the electoral map and extended the maximum term of the Legislature from four to five years.

Sixteen new seats were added, increasing the total number of seats from 25 to 41. Seven of the new constituencies were located south of the central City of Red Deer, seven were north of Red Deer, and two districts were adjacent to the Red Deer city in land to be opened up for settlement by new railroads. The districts of Calgary and Edmonton were provided with a second seat, and elections were to be held using multiple non-transferable vote. Historian Lewis Thomas notes that the idea of redistribution was deemed necessary due to the rapid population growth and development, and the significant increase in seats was generally accepted without controversy. However, Albert Robertson, leader of the Conservative Party and representative for High River, criticized the extension of the election cycle from four to five years and the provisions for two members in each of Calgary and Edmonton. Liberal representative Anthony Rosenroll, who represented Wetaskiwin, also criticized the changes, believing that rural constituencies deserved greater representation.

=== Voting and eligibility ===
During the first provincial election in 1905, the eligibility requirements for voters and candidates remained in place as per the rules established by the North-West Legislative Assembly through The Territories Elections Ordinance. The right to vote was granted to male British subjects who were 21 years or older, had resided in the North-West Territories for at least 12 months, and had lived in the electoral district for the preceding three months. The election took place on November 9, 1905, with polling stations open from 9:00 a.m. to 5:00 p.m. During the 1905 election, voters marked an "X" on a blank sheet of paper using a coloured pencil that corresponded to the candidate they wished to vote for, with red representing the Liberal Party and blue representing the Conservative Party.

During the fourth session of the first Legislative Assembly, the government introduced the Act respecting Elections of Members of the Legislative Assembly. This Act stipulated that voters must be male British subjects, 21 years of age or older, who had resided in Alberta for a minimum of 12 months, and had lived in the electoral district for the preceding three months. The new Act continued to exclude judges, prisoners, and Indigenous persons from voting. Additionally, the Act provided the government with the option to postpone the election date for the electoral districts of Athabasca and Peace River to allow more time for information about the nominated candidates to be disseminated. This provision proved unnecessary for Peace River, as Liberal candidate James Cornwall was acclaimed. However, it was utilized for Athabasca, with the election taking place more than three months later on July 15, 1909.

Unlike the 1905 election, the Returning Officers were required to print ballots with each candidate's name listed in alphabetical order.

== The Campaign and election results ==
=== Liberal ===
In the 1905 election, the Liberal Party, led by Rutherford, achieved a landslide victory by securing 22 out of the 25 seats. During the first Legislature, the Liberal Party focused on implementing measures to develop the province. Their campaign centered on portraying the Conservative Party as subordinates to the Canadian Pacific Company, labeling them as "butler-in-ordinary" to the company. The Liberal Party faced hostility from the Canadian Pacific Company due to the government's actions, such as imposing taxes on railway lands, enacting the Workers Compensation Act, limiting the workday in coal mines to eight hours, enforcing Sabbath restrictions strictly, and implementing a new provincial railway policy to expand railway lines within the province.

Premier Rutherford dedicated much of his election efforts to conservative strongholds in Southern Alberta, including Calgary, Lethbridge, and Pincher Creek, where he campaigned for candidates. The Liberal Party's campaign slogan was "Rutherford, Reliability, and Railroads." Rutherford also appealed to voters, urging them not to view the election as a purely partisan affair. He emphasized that all voters were "Albertans" and that the interests of the province should take precedence over party affiliations. Prominent Conservative lawyer Paddy Nolan unexpectedly supported the Liberal Party during the election, Nolan went as far as campaigning alongside Rutherford throughout the province, despite his own Conservative affiliation.

Once again, the Liberal Party emerged victorious in the election, securing a strong majority of votes and seats in the Legislature. Eight members were elected by acclamation, while Cabinet members enjoyed significant support from their constituents. The Liberal Party's influence was particularly dominant in Northern Alberta.

=== Conservative ===
Following the disappointing outcome of the 1905 election, and with the failure to secure a seat in Calgary, R. B. Bennett, the leader of the Conservative Party, resigned from his position and temporarily withdrew from politics. Only two Conservative candidates were successful in the election: Hiebert in Rosebud and Albert Robertson in High River. When the first session of the Legislature commenced in 1906, Robertson was appointed as the Leader of the Opposition. In the Legislature, Robertson advocated for public ownership of the telephone system and railways, which differed from the government's policy of leaving both sectors under private control.

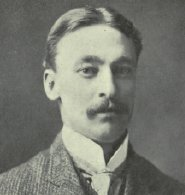
Maitland Stewart McCarthy, a federal Member of Parliament was offered the position of Conservative Party leader, but declined.

Prior to the 1909 election, the Conservative Party convention was held to establish party policies and select a new leader. Robertson, known for his staunch conservatism and loyalty, faced criticism for his imperial connections. The other Conservative representative, Cornelius Hiebert, displayed little interest in partisan politics and increasingly aligned himself with the Liberal government. Hiebert and Robertson clashed during the session, and although Hiebert supported the party platform at the convention, he decided to run as an Independent in the 1909 election. The leadership of the Conservative Party was offered to Maitland Stewart McCarthy, a lawyer and Member of the House of Commons for Calgary. However, McCarthy declined the leadership offer as it would require him to resign his federal seat, which he had controversially won in the 1908 election, and he believed that such a resignation would be perceived as an admission of guilt for the 1908 controversy. Despite not contesting the election, Robert Brett was seen as the de facto leader of the Conservative Party. R. B. Bennett, without his consent, was nominated as a candidate, which led him to return to politics. However, he did not consider taking on the leadership of the party again. The convention failed to select a permanent leader, leaving the party effectively without a leader, despite Robertson holding the position of Leader of the Opposition in the Legislature.

The Conservative convention platform aligned with many aspects of the Liberal government's policies but advocated for government ownership in certain areas such as railways and telephones. The platform also promised initiatives such as Initiative, Referendum, and Recall, as well as a plebiscite on the prohibition of liquor trafficking. Other platform proposals included reforestation in areas affected by forest fires, a commission for electrical power, the establishment of an experimental farm, civil service reform, the construction of highways, government-owned grain elevators, and other initiatives.

Once again, the Conservative Party failed to make a significant impact with voters, managing to secure only two seats in the Legislature, with Bennett winning in Calgary and George Hoadley in the neighboring Okotoks constituency. Historian Lewis Thomas notes that the Conservatives were compelled to accept another "moral victory," although prominent Conservative William Antrobus Griesbach expressed weariness with such symbolic victories.

=== Other parties ===
Third parties and Independent candidates played a large role in the election. In five districts the only opposition to the Liberal candidate was an Independent or candidate of a small party. These were St. Albert, Strathcona, Camrose, Red Deer and Pakan.

In the 1909 election, Charles M. O'Brien, a Socialist candidate, achieved victory in the coal mining district of Rocky Mountain. Although he did not receive official union support, he gained significant backing from the coal miners in the district. In a closely contested race, O'Brien narrowly defeated Liberal candidate John Angus Macdonald by a margin of only 32 votes. O'Brien's successful election to the legislature indicated a growing trend of radicalization among coal miners in Alberta.

Lethbridge City's incumbent MLA Donald McNabb, the only Labour Party man in the Legislature, ran for his seat again in 1909 but he placed a distant third. Since his election earlier in 1909, he been recognized as a moderate man - it is reported that BC labour king-pin R.P. Prettipiece had criticized his politics. He was the only man to run under the Labour label in 1909.

Independent-Conservative candidate Edward Michener defeated the Liberal incumbent John Thomas Moore in Red Deer. The Conservative Party chose not to field a candidate in the district, and Michener captured 51.3 per cent of the vote. Courting Liberal voters, he had said if elected, he would support Liberal Premier Rutherford.

== Aftermath ==
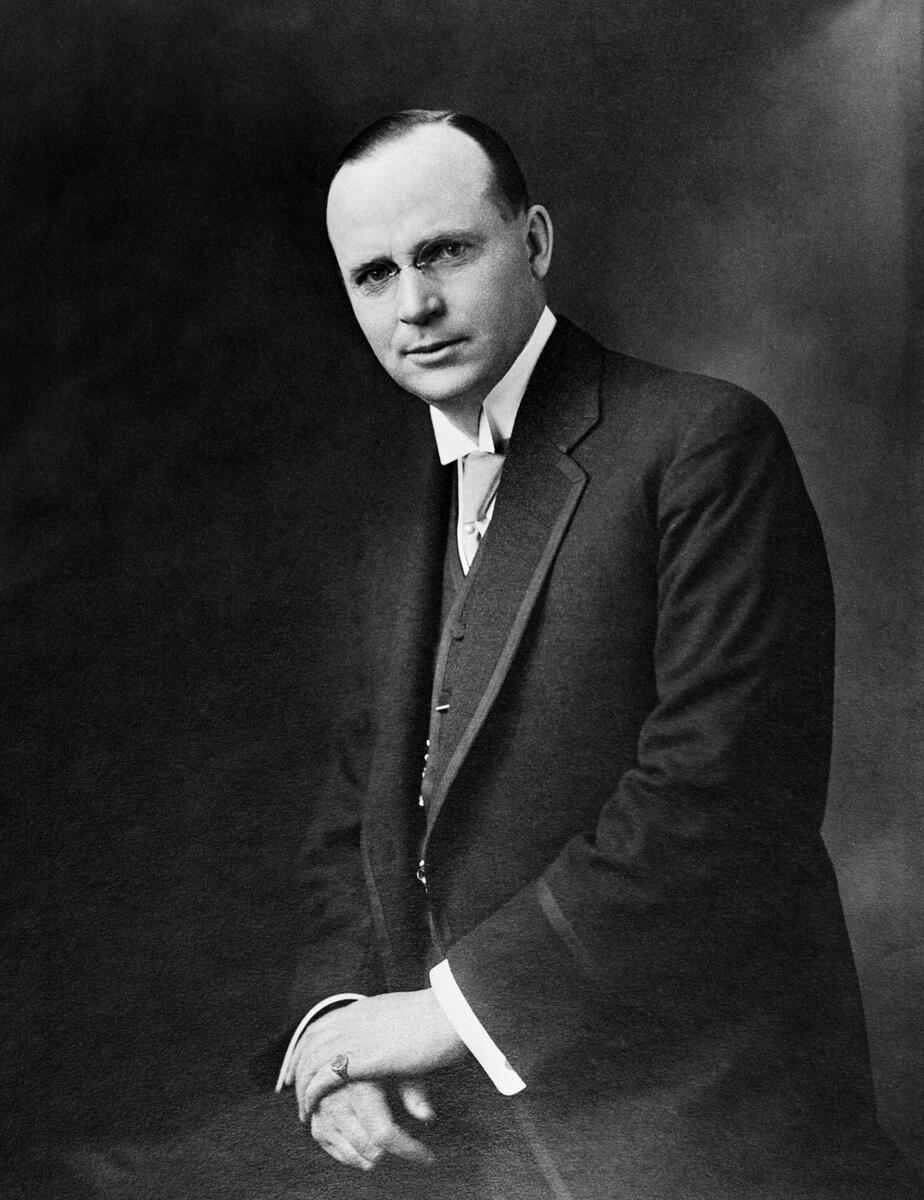
R. B. Bennett was elected as a Conservative candidate in the Calgary district.

The Edmonton Bulletin noted after the beginning of the 2nd Legislature, despite still holding only two seats, experienced an improvement in their position. This was attributed to the presence of R. B. Bennett in the legislature, with the newspaper describing him as superior to both Robertson and Hiebert in terms of political skills and debating abilities.

=== Alberta and Great Waterways Railway scandal ===
Prior to the 1909 election, the Alberta and Great Waterways Railway (A&GW) President William Clarke had announced that the line would be completed by the end of 1912, ahead of schedule. When the A&GW bonds went on sale in London in November 1909, the issue was oversubscribed. The following month, the contract for ties was awarded. Everything seemed to be progressing as planned when, at the beginning of the new legislative session, Liberal backbencher John R. Boyle asked the government a series of innocuous questions about the company and the guarantees made to it. Rutherford, Minister of Railways as well as Premier, responded to the questions in writing. Before he did so, however, a rumour began to circulate that William Henry Cushing, Minister of Public Works, had resigned from the cabinet.

Boyle and Conservative leader R. B. Bennett questioned Rutherford about the rumours, but Rutherford initially refused to make any announcement. The next day, however, the rumour was confirmed when the Premier read Cushing's letter of resignation in the legislature. In this letter, Cushing gave his reasons for resigning as disagreement with the government's railway policy, which he claimed was developed without his involvement or consent. Rutherford disagreed with this claim, and expressed his regret for Cushing's resignation.

The scandal split the Liberal Party: Rutherford's Minister of Public Works, William Henry Cushing, resigned from the government and publicly attacked its railway policy, and a large portion of the Liberal caucus voted to defeat the government in the Legislative Assembly of Alberta. The government survived all of these votes. Rutherford largely placated the legislature by appointing a royal commission to investigate the affair, but pressure from Lieutenant-Governor George Bulyea and unrest within his own caucus forced Rutherford's resignation and his replacement by Arthur Sifton.

The royal commission gave its report months after Rutherford resigned. The majority on the commission did not find Rutherford or his cabinet guilty of any wrongdoing, but criticized them for poor judgment, both concerning to the loan guarantees and the exemptions the A&GW received from provincial legislation. A minority report was more sympathetic, and declared the allegations against them "disproved".

James Cornwall, a Liberal backbencher who supported Rutherford, fared somewhat worse: his personal financial involvement in the railway gave rise to "suspicious circumstances", but he too was not proven guilty of any wrongdoing.

Besides provoking Rutherford's resignation, the scandal opened rifts in the Liberal Party that took years to heal. Sifton eventually smoothed over most of these divisions, but was frustrated in his railway policy by legal defeats. He ultimately adopted a similar policy to Rutherford's, and the A&GW was eventually built by private interests using the money raised from provincial loan guarantees.

== Results ==
Party	Votes			Seats	
Liberal	29,634	59.3%	▲1.7pp	36 / 41 (88%)	▲14
Conservative	15,848	31.7%	▼5.4pp	2 / 41 (5%)	N/A
Socialist	1,302	2.6%	N/A	1 / 41 (2%)	▲1
Others and independents	3,220	6.4%	▼0.5pp	2 / 41 (5%)	▲1

Popular vote
Liberal	59.26%
Conservative	31.70%
Socialist	2.60%
Others	6.44%

Seats summary
Liberal	87.80%
Conservative	4.88%
Socialist	2.44%
Others	4.88%

=== Full results ===
Summary of the 1909 Alberta general election
Party	Leader	Candidates	Seats				Popular vote		
Party	Leader	Candidates	1905	Dissol.	1909	+/-	Votes	%	+/- (pp)
Liberal	Alexander Cameron Rutherford	42	23	22	36	+14	29,634	59.26%	+1.70
Conservative	Albert Robertson	29	2	2	2	0	15,848	31.69%	−5.44
Independent		6	0	0	1	+1	1,695	3.39%	−1.92
Independent Liberal		2	0	0	1	+1	1,311	2.62%	—N/a
Socialist		2	0	0	1	+1	1,302	2.60%	—N/a
Labour	Donald McNabb	1	0	1	0	-1	214	0.43%	—N/a
Total		82	25	25	41		50,004	100%	

== Members elected ==
For complete electoral history, see individual districts

Electoral district	Candidates			Incumbent
Electoral district	Liberal	Conservative	Other	Incumbent
Alexandra	Alwyn Bramley-Moore; 771; 64.63%	James R. Lowery; 422; 35.37%		New District
Athabasca	Jean Côté; 230; 59.59%	V. Maurice; 7; 1.81%	William Bredin (Liberal); 149; 38.60%	William Fletcher Bredin
Calgary	William Henry Cushing; 2,579; 26.90%	Thomas Blow; 1,907; 19.88%	George Howell (Socialist); 747; 7.79%	William Henry Cushing
Calgary	William Egbert; 1,933; 20.16%	R. B. Bennett; 2,423; 25.27%		William Henry Cushing
Camrose	George P. Smith; 1,010; 55.16%	I.W.T. McEachern; 821; 44.84%		New District
Cardston	John William Woolf; 521; 57.44%	Levi Harker; 386; 42.56%		John William Woolf
Claresholm	Malcolm McKenzie; 696; 61.87%	Fred Garrow; 429; 38.13%		New District
Cochrane	Charles Wellington Fisher; 627; 67.56%	Robert George Brett; 301; 32.44%		New District from Banff and Rosebud; Charles Wellington Fisher
Didsbury	Joseph E. Stauffer; 993; 73.18%	Samuel T. Scarlett; 208; 15.33%	Cornelius Hiebert; 156; 11.50%	New District from Rosebud; Cornelius Hiebert
Edmonton	Charles Wilson Cross; 3,282; 40.01%	Albert Freeman Ewing; 1,595; 19.45%	John Gailbraith; 348; 4.24%	Charles Wilson Cross
Edmonton	John Alexander McDougall; 2,977; 36.30%			Charles Wilson Cross
Gleichen	Ezra H. Riley; 770; 59.46%	James Shouldice; 525; 40.54%		Ezra Riley
High River	Louis Melville Roberts; 604; 50.33%	George Douglas Stanley; 596; 49.67%		Albert J. Robertson
Innisfail	John A. Simpson; 519; 53.45%	George W. West; 452; 46.55%		John A. Simpson
Lac Ste. Anne	Peter Gunn; Acclaimed			New District
Lacombe	William Franklin Puffer; Acclaimed			William Franklin Puffer
Leduc	Robert T. Telford; Acclaimed			Robert T. Telford
Lethbridge City	William Ashbury Buchanan; 529; 44.12%	William C. Ives; 456; 38.03%	Donald McNabb (Labour); 214; 17.85%	New District from Lethbridge; Donald McNabb
Lethbridge District	John H. Rivers; 620; 43.94%		Archibald J. McLean (Ind. Liberal); 791; 56.06%	New District from Lethbridge
Macleod	Colin Genge; 342; 51.12%	E.P. McNeill; 327; 48.88%		Malcolm McKenzie
Medicine Hat	William Thomas Finlay; 1,249; 71.66%	Francis O. Sissons; 494; 28.34%		William Thomas Finlay
Nanton	John M. Glendenning; 439; 54.88%	Albert J. Robertson; 361; 45.13%		New District
Okotoks	Malcolm McHardy; 407; 43.72%	George Hoadley; 524; 56.28%		New District
Olds	Duncan Marshall; 760; 64.63%	George McDonald; 416; 35.37%		New District
Pakan	Prosper-Edmond Lessard; Acclaimed			New District
Peace River	James K. Cornwall; Acclaimed			Thomas A. Brick
Pembina	Henry William McKenney; Acclaimed			New District
Pincher Creek	David Warnock; 560; 57.26%	E.J. Mitchell; 418; 42.74%		John Plummer Marcellus
Ponoka	William A. Campbell; 466; 67.05%	John A. Jackson; 229; 32.95%		John R. McLeod
Red Deer	John T. Moore; 494; 38.56%		Edward Michener; 657; 51.29%	John T. Moore
Red Deer	John T. Moore; 494; 38.56%		Donald McClure; 130; 10.15%	John T. Moore
Rocky Mountain	John Angus Macdonald; 520; 35.45%	Henry Edward Lyon; 392; 26.72%	Charles M. O'Brien (Socialist); 555; 37.83%	New District
Sedgewick	Charles Stewart; Acclaimed			New District
St. Albert	Lucien Boudreau; 528; 50.97%		Wilfrid Gariépy (Liberal); 393; 37.93% Omer St. Germain (Ind. Liberal); 115; 11.10%	Henry William McKenney
Stettler	Robert L. Shaw; 873; 71.27%	J.K. Creighton; 352; 28.73%		New District
Stony Plain	John A. McPherson; 398; 43.74%	John McKinley; 108; 11.87%	Dan Bronx (Ind.); 250; 27.47% Charlie R. Cropley (Ind.); 154; 16.92%	John A. McPherson
Strathcona	Alexander Cameron Rutherford; 1,034; 85.67%	Rice Sheppard; 173; 14.33%		Alexander Cameron Rutherford
Sturgeon	John Robert Boyle; Acclaimed			John Robert Boyle
Vegreville	James Bismark Holden; 1,249; 72.66%	F.W. Fane; 470; 27.34%		New District
Vermilion	Archibald Campbell; 919; 66.55%	Albert Richard Aldridge; 462; 33.45%		James Bismark Holden
Victoria	Francis A. Walker; Acclaimed			Francis A. Walker
Wetaskiwin	Charles H. Olin; 713; 59.82%	James George Anderson; 479; 40.18%		Anthony Sigwart de Rosenroll

== See also ==
- List of Alberta political parties
