= William Ashbury Buchanan =

Canadian politician and journalist (1876–1954)

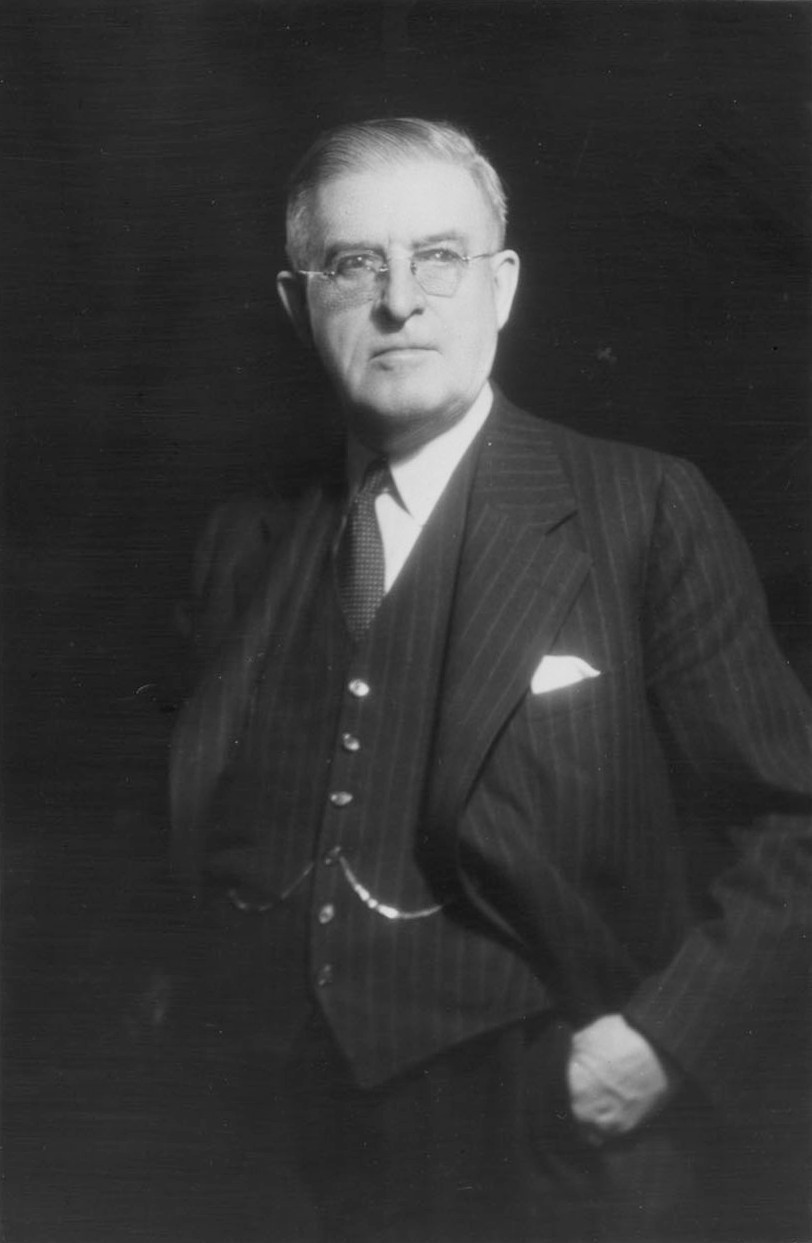

Canadian Senator from Alberta
- In office 5 September 1925 – 11 July 1954
- Preceded by: Jean Côté
- Succeeded by: Donald Cameron

Member of Parliament for Lethbridge Medicine Hat (1911-1917)
- In office 21 September 1911 – 5 December 1921

Member of the Legislative Assembly of Alberta for Lethbridge City
- In office 22 March 1909 – 31 October 1911
- Preceded by: New District
- Succeeded by: John Smith Stewart

Personal details
- Born: William Francis Asbury Buchanan; 2 July 1876 Fraserville, Ontario, Canada
- Died: 8 July 1954 (aged 78)
- Party: Liberal Party of Alberta; Unionist; Liberal Party of Canada

William Francis Asbury Buchanan (2 July 1876 – 12 July 1954) was a Canadian journalist, newspaper publisher and politician.

== Early life ==
William Francis Asbury Buchanan was born on 2 July 1876, at South Monaghan, Northumberland and Durham County, Ontario, one of seven children to Reverend William Buchanan and Mary Rebecca Pendrie Buchanan. He was given two middle names derived from Rev. Francis Asbury, the first bishop of the Methodist Episcopal Church to be consecrated in America. Buchanan took an early interest in journalism, with his first article published by Brighton's Weekly Ensign at the age of thirteen.

Buchanan began his career in journalism in 1893 working for The Peterborough Examiner which he was affiliated with for a three year period, he also worked on the editorial staff for The Peterboro Review until 1898. He later was employed as the city editor of the Toronto Telegram until 1903. He served as secretary of the Ontario Hockey Association prior to 1903, when succeeded by W. A. Hewitt.

Buchanan was the managing director of the journal in St. Thomas from 1903 until 1905. He left Ontario in 1905 and moved west to Alberta and purchased the Lethbridge Weekly Herald. He attempted, unsuccessfully, to turn the paper into a daily in 1907 but it soon resumed a weekly publishing schedule. Buchanan was also named the first librarian of the Alberta Legislature in 1906.

Buchanan married Alma Maude Freeman in 1904 and had two children together, Donald and Hugh.

== Political life ==
Buchanan entered provincial politics when he contested the riding of Lethbridge City on behalf of the Alberta Liberal Party in the 1909 provincial election and won a seat in the 2nd Alberta Legislature. Buchanan defeated his Conservative opponent William Carlos Ives by 73 votes, and Labor opponent Donald McNabb by 315 votes. Buchanan had previously served as the president of the Lethbridge Liberal Association prior to his decision to run provincially. Buchanan was appointed Minister without portfolio in Alexander Cameron Rutherford's government after the election, however he resigned his Cabinet position on 8 March 1910, over a disagreement with provincial railway policy resulting from the Alberta and Great Waterways Railway scandal, and later resigned his seat in the Legislature on 20 September 1911.

Buchanan switched to federal politics in the 1911 federal election. Buchanan was a strong believer in reciprocity, a policy of increasing trade with the United States led by Liberal Prime Minister Wilfrid Laurier. On 10 August 1911, Buchanan was the unanimous choice at the Medicine Hat Liberal convention as the candidate in the upcoming election. Buchanan was subsequently successful, and was elected for the seat of Medicine Hat as a federal Liberal defeating Conservative incumbent Charles Alexander Magrath by 1,355 votes. Despite Buchanan's success in Medicine Hat, the Liberal Party lost 48 seats and control of Parliament, and new Conservative government led by Robert Borden took charge.

As a result of the Conscription Crisis of 1917, Buchanan crossed the floor to support the government of Sir Robert Borden. He was re-elected to the House of Commons of Canada as a Unionist for the new riding of Lethbridge in the 1917 general election defeating Laurier Liberals opponent Lambert "L" Pack. In 1918, Buchanan was part of a group of Canadian journalists brought over-seas to see the battlefields and military installations of the First World War as guests of Lord Beaverbrook, the head of the British wartime Ministry of Information. He wrote several installments published in the Lethbridge Herald about what he witnessed during the trip.

Buchanan weighed his options ahead of the 1921 election, deciding whether he would contest the riding for the Liberal party. Mackenzie King pushed Buchanan to stand for election, and Buchanan privately consented to run as an Independent Liberal, however Buchanan later changed his mind and chose not to run. He announced his decision on the first page of the Lethbridge Herald on 24 October 1921.

Buchanan was called to the Senate of Canada at the age of 49 on 5 September 1925, on the advice of Prime Minister William Lyon Mackenzie King, and served until his death in 1954 as a member of the Liberal Party of Canada. Buchanan was a passionate supporter of Waterton Lakes National Park while in the Senate, calling for a fish hatchery, expansion of the Park into British Columbia, championing the International Peace Park status which was realized in 1932 as Waterton-Glacier International Peace Park. In the Senate he was referred to as "the Senator from Waterton Lakes National Park".

== Later life and legacy ==
In 1944, Buchanan was elected president of The Canadian Press. Buchanan continued as owner of the Lethbridge Herald until his death.

A malignant growth was discovered in Buchanan's body sometime in August 1953 and he died on 12 July 1954, ten days after celebrating his 78th birthday.

Buchanan was an ardent supporter of the Waterton Lakes National Park, where a number of features bare his name, including Buchanan Peak (in the Clark Range which was named for the Senator in 1971, and Buchanan Ridge.

Legislative Assembly of Alberta
Preceded by New District	MLA Lethbridge City; 1909-1911	Succeeded by John Smith Stewart
Parliament of Canada
Preceded by Charles Alexander Magrath	Member of Parliament Medicine Hat; 1911-1917	Succeeded by Arthur Lewis Sifton
Preceded by New District	Member of Parliament Lethbridge; 1917–1921	Succeeded by Lincoln Henry Jelliff
Preceded by Jean Côté	Senator Alberta; 1925-1954	Succeeded by Donald Cameron
