= Andrew Smeaton =

Canadian politician

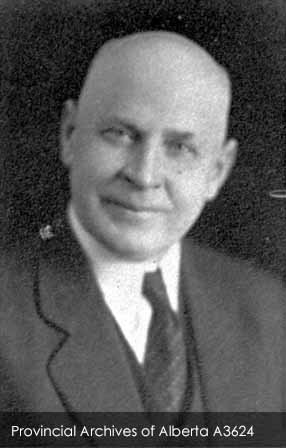

Member of the Legislative Assembly of Alberta
- In office June 28, 1926 – August 22, 1935
- Preceded by: John Stewart
- Succeeded by: Hans Wight
- Constituency: Lethbridge

Personal details
- Born: August 20, 1879 Greenlaw, Berwickshire, Scotland
- Died: September 5, 1947 (aged 68)
- Party: Dominion Labor
- Occupation: politician

Andrew Smeaton was a provincial politician from Alberta, Canada. He served as a member of the Legislative Assembly of Alberta from 1926 to 1935 sitting with the Dominion Labor caucus in opposition.

== Political career ==
Smeaton ran for a seat to the Alberta Legislature in the 1926 Alberta general election as a candidate under the Dominion Labor banner. He defeated two other candidates on the second count to pick up the vacant district for his party.

Smeaton ran for a second term in office in the 1930 Alberta general election. He defeated two other candidates including Lethbridge Mayor Robert Barrowman on the second vote count once again to hold his seat.

Smeaton ran for a third term in office in the 1935 Alberta general election. He faced three other candidates including Barrowman for the second time. Smeaton was badly defeated finishing third place behind Barrowman and Hans Wight who won the district for Social Credit.
