= Lethbridge (provincial electoral district) =

Defunct provincial electoral district in Alberta, Canada

Coordinates: 49.694°N 112.833°W

Alberta electoral district

Defunct provincial electoral district
- Legislature: Legislative Assembly of Alberta
- District created: 1905
- District abolished: 1909
- District re-created: 1921
- District re-abolished: 1971
- First contested: 1905
- Last contested: 1967

Lethbridge was a provincial electoral district in Alberta, Canada, mandated to return a single member to the Legislative Assembly of Alberta from 1905 to 1909, and again from 1921 to 1971.

== History ==
The riding has existed twice, from 1905 to 1909, and again from 1921 to 1971. The Lethbridge electoral district was founded as one of the original 25 electoral districts contested in the 1905 Alberta general election after Alberta became a province in September 1905. The electoral district was a continuation of the Lethbridge electoral district that had elected a single member to the Legislative Assembly of the North-West Territories from 1891 to 1905.

In 1905, the Lethbridge electoral district covered a large patch of southern Alberta. It was broken into Lethbridge District and Lethbridge City in 1909. After Lethbridge District was broken up into Taber and Little Bow in 1913, Lethbridge City was all that remained, using the Lethbridge name; in 1921 the Lethbridge district was reformed after City was dropped from the name.

From 1924 to 1956, the district used instant-runoff voting to elect its MLA.

The Lethbridge electoral district was abolished in the 1971 electoral district re-distribution, and the territory was formed into Lethbridge-East and Lethbridge-West electoral districts.

The riding was named after the Southern Alberta city of Lethbridge.

Lethbridge
Assembly	Years	Member	Party
1st	1905–1906	Leverett George DeVeber	Liberal
1st	1906–1909	William Charles Simmons	Liberal
District dissolved into Lethbridge City and Lethbridge District
District re-created from Lethbridge City
5th	1921–1926	John Smith Stewart	Independent
6th	1926–1930	Andrew Smeaton	Dominion Labor
7th	1930–1935	Andrew Smeaton	Dominion Labor
8th	1935–1937	Hans E. Wight	Social Credit
8th	1937–1940	Peter M. Campbell	Independent
9th	1940–1944	Peter M. Campbell	Independent
10th	1944–1948	John C. Landeryou	Social Credit
11th	1948–1952	John C. Landeryou	Social Credit
12th	1952–1955	John C. Landeryou	Social Credit
13th	1955–1959	John C. Landeryou	Social Credit
14th	1959–1963	John C. Landeryou	Social Credit
15th	1963–1967	John C. Landeryou	Social Credit
16th	1967–1971	John C. Landeryou	Social Credit
District dissolved into Lethbridge-East and Lethbridge-West

=== Representation ===
Liberal Leverett George DeVeber was elected as the first representative for the Lethbridge electoral district in 1905, DeVeber had previously held the Lethbridge seat in the Northwest Territories Legislature from 1898 to 1905. DeVeber's time as the representative was short as he was appointed to the Senate on March 8, 1906.

He was followed by William Charles Simmons and Donald McNabb.

== Election results ==
=== 1905 ===
1905 Alberta general election
Party	Candidate	Votes	%	±%
Liberal	Leverett George DeVeber	639	56.55%	–
Conservative	William Carlos Ives	491	43.45%	–
Total		1,130	–	–
Rejected, spoiled and declined		N/A	–	–
Eligible electors / turnout		N/A	N/A	–
Liberal pickup new district.				
Source(s) Source: "Lethbridge Official Results 1905 Alberta general election". Alberta Heritage Community Foundation.

=== 1906 by-election ===
Alberta provincial by-election, April 12, 1906 Upon Leverett George DeVeber's appointment to the Senate of Canada on March 8, 1906
Party	Candidate	Votes	%	±%
Liberal	William Charles Simmons	543	43.90%	–
Dominion Labor	Frank Henry Sherman	463	37.43%	–
Conservative	A. E. Keffer	231	18.67%	–
Total		1,237	–	–
Rejected, spoiled and declined		N/A	–	–
Eligible electors / turnout		N/A	N/A	–
Liberal hold		Swing		N/A
Source(s) "By-elections". Elections Alberta.

In 1908, Simmons resigned. A by-election was scheduled for January 8, 1909. Labour activist Donald McNabb was the only candidate nominated so he won the seat by acclamation.

The district was broken into the Lethbridge District and the Lethbridge City district prior to the next general election.

=== 1921 ===
1921 Alberta general election
Party	Candidate	Votes	%	±%
Independent	John Smith Stewart	2,252	62.11%	–
Dominion Labor	John Marsh	1,374	37.89%	–
Total		3,626	–	–
Rejected, spoiled and declined		N/A	–	–
Eligible electors / turnout		5,549	65.35%	–
Independent pickup new district.				
Source(s) Source: "Lethbridge Official Results 1921 Alberta general election". Alberta Heritage Community Foundation.

=== 1926 ===
1926 Alberta general election
Party	Candidate	Votes 1st count	%	Votes final count	±%
Dominion Labor	Andrew Smeaton	1,584	37.11%	1,962	-0.78%
Conservative	Richard R. Davidson	1,459	34.18%	1,713	–
Liberal	Walter S. Galbraith	1,225	28.70%	–	–
Total		4,268	–	–	–
Rejected, spoiled and declined		273	–	–	–
Eligible electors / turnout		6,353	71.48%	6.13%	–
Dominion Labor gain from Independent		Swing		-10.64%	
Source(s) Source: "Lethbridge Official Results 1926 Alberta general election". Alberta Heritage Community Foundation. Instant-runoff voting requires a candidate to receive a plurality (greater than 50%) of the votes. As no candidate received a plurality of votes, the bottom candidate was eliminated and their 2nd place votes were applied to both other candidates until one received a plurality.

=== 1930 ===
1930 Alberta general election
Party	Candidate	Votes 1st count	%	Votes final count	±%
Dominion Labor	Andrew Smeaton	2,036	43.89%	2,238	6.78%
Independent	William D. L. Hardie	1,598	34.45%	1,978	–
Independent	Robert Barrowman	1,005	21.66%	–	–
Total		4,639	–	–	–
Rejected, spoiled and declined		308	–	–	–
Eligible electors / turnout		7,377	67.06%	-4.42%	–
Dominion Labor hold		Swing		3.26%	
Source(s) Source: "Lethbridge Official Results 1930 Alberta general election". Alberta Heritage Community Foundation. Instant-runoff voting requires a candidate to receive a plurality (greater than 50%) of the votes. As no candidate received a plurality of votes, the bottom candidate was eliminated and their 2nd place votes were applied to both other candidates until one received a plurality.

=== 1935 ===
1935 Alberta general election
Party	Candidate	Votes	%	±%
Social Credit	Hans E. Wight	3,700	55.71%	–
Liberal	Robert Barrowman	1,946	29.30%	–
Dominion Labor	Andrew Smeaton	654	9.85%	-34.04%
Conservative	G. W. Green	341	5.13%	–
Total		6,641	–	–
Rejected, spoiled and declined		182	–	–
Eligible electors / turnout		8,360	81.61%	14.56%
Social Credit gain from Dominion Labor		Swing		8.48%
Source(s) Source: "Lethbridge Official Results 1935 Alberta general election". Alberta Heritage Community Foundation.

=== 1937 by-election ===
Alberta provincial by-election, December 2, 1937 Upon the resignation of Hans E. Wight
Party	Candidate	Votes	%	±%
Independent Movement	Peter M. Campbell	4,099	55.56%	–
Social Credit	A. J. Burnap	3,279	44.44%	-11.27%
Total valid votes		7,378	–	–
Rejected, spoiled, and declined		–	–	–
Electors / turnout		–	–	–
Independent Movement gain from Social Credit		Swing		N/A
Source(s) "By-elections". Elections Alberta.

=== 1940 ===
1940 Alberta general election
Party	Candidate	Votes	%	±%
Independent Movement	Peter M. Campbell	4,318	61.01%	5.55%
Social Credit	A. E. Smith	2,760	38.99%	-5.45%
Total		7,078	–	–
Rejected, spoiled and declined		274	–	–
Eligible electors / turnout		8,815	83.40%	1.79%
Independent Movement hold		Swing		-2.20%
Source(s) Source: "Lethbridge Official Results 1940 Alberta general election". Alberta Heritage Community Foundation.

=== 1944 ===
1944 Alberta general election
Party	Candidate	Votes 1st count	%	Votes final count	±%
Social Credit	John C. Landeryou	2,367	37.59%	2,692	-1.40%
Independent	David Horton Elton	2,247	35.68%	2,388	–
Co-operative Commonwealth	B. F. Tanner	1,464	23.25%	–	–
Labor-Progressive	Eugene Scully	219	3.48%	–	–
Total		6,297	–	–	–
Rejected, spoiled and declined		42	–	–	–
Eligible electors / turnout		9,190	68.98%	-14.43%	–
Social Credit gain from Independent Movement		Swing		-10.05%	
Source(s) Source: "Lethbridge Official Results 1944 Alberta general election". Alberta Heritage Community Foundation. Instant-runoff voting requires a candidate to receive a plurality (greater than 50%) of the votes. As no candidate received a plurality of votes, the bottom candidate was eliminated and their 2nd place votes were applied to both other candidates until one received a plurality.

=== 1948 ===
1948 Alberta general election
Party	Candidate	Votes	%	±%
Social Credit	John C. Landeryou	3,829	54.40%	16.82%
Liberal	H. B. McLaughlin	1,768	25.12%	–
Co-operative Commonwealth	Emil S. Vaselenak	1,441	20.47%	-2.77%
Total		7,038	–	–
Rejected, spoiled and declined		507	–	–
Eligible electors / turnout		11,611	64.98%	-4.00%
Social Credit hold		Swing		13.69%
Source(s) Source: "Lethbridge Official Results 1948 Alberta general election". Alberta Heritage Community Foundation.

=== 1952 ===
1952 Alberta general election
Party	Candidate	Votes	%	±%
Social Credit	John C. Landeryou	4,975	72.35%	17.95%
Liberal	Rex J. Tennant	1,901	27.65%	2.53%
Total		6,876	–	–
Rejected, spoiled and declined		658	–	–
Eligible electors / turnout		14,018	53.75%	-11.24%
Social Credit hold		Swing		7.71%
Source(s) Source: "Lethbridge Official Results 1952 Alberta general election". Alberta Heritage Community Foundation.

=== 1955 ===
1955 Alberta general election
Party	Candidate	Votes	%	±%
Social Credit	John C. Landeryou	4,788	50.28%	-22.07%
Liberal	Alan Cullen	3,361	35.30%	7.65%
Conservative	C.J. Black	883	9.27%	–
Co-operative Commonwealth	James E. Helwig	490	5.15%	–
Total		9,522	–	–
Rejected, spoiled and declined		418	–	–
Eligible electors / turnout		15,635	63.58%	9.83%
Social Credit hold		Swing		-14.86%
Source(s) Source: "Lethbridge Official Results 1955 Alberta general election". Alberta Heritage Community Foundation.

=== 1959 ===
1959 Alberta general election
Party	Candidate	Votes	%	±%
Social Credit	John C. Landeryou	7,250	62.01%	11.72%
Progressive Conservative	Thomas Spanos	2,917	24.95%	–
Liberal	Robery Henry Jeacock	1,525	13.04%	-22.25%
Total		11,692	–	–
Rejected, spoiled and declined		45	–	–
Eligible electors / turnout		18,119	64.78%	1.20%
Social Credit hold		Swing		11.04%
Source(s) Source: "Lethbridge Official Results 1959 Alberta general election". Alberta Heritage Community Foundation.

=== 1963 ===
1963 Alberta general election
Party	Candidate	Votes	%	±%
Social Credit	John C. Landeryou	6,975	60.23%	-1.78%
Liberal	Alan Cullen	3,786	32.69%	19.65%
New Democratic	James Taylor	820	7.08%	–
Total		11,581	–	–
Rejected, spoiled and declined		34	–	–
Eligible electors / turnout		20,117	57.74%	-7.04%
Social Credit hold		Swing		-4.76%
Source(s) Source: "Lethbridge Official Results 1963 Alberta general election". Alberta Heritage Community Foundation.

=== 1967 ===
1967 Alberta general election
Party	Candidate	Votes	%	±%
Social Credit	John C. Landeryou	6,155	44.42%	-15.80%
Progressive Conservative	Wilfred Browns	4,128	29.79%	–
Liberal	John I. Boras	2,237	16.15%	-16.55%
New Democratic	Klaas Buijert	1,335	9.64%	2.55%
Total		13,855	–	–
Rejected, spoiled and declined		49	–	–
Eligible electors / turnout		21,449	64.82%	7.09%
Social Credit hold		Swing		-6.45%
Source(s) Source: "Lethbridge Official Results 1967 Alberta general election". Alberta Heritage Community Foundation.

== Plebiscite results ==
=== 1923 prohibition plebiscite ===
Options presented on the ballot	Votes	%
(a) Prohibition - Meaning thereby a continuance and development of present Liquor Legislation; that is, meaning the Abolition of the Sale of all Liquors excepting for strictly Medicinal Sacramental, Manufacturing and Scientific Purposes.	1,342	%
(b) Licensed Sale of Beer - Meaning thereby, the Sale of Beer in Licensed Hotels and other Premises, as provided in the proposed Temperance Act.	56	%
(c) Government Sale of Beer - Meaning thereby, the Sale of Beer by or through Government Vendors for consumption in Private Residences under Government Control and Regulations - other Liquors to be sold through Doctor's Prescription for Medicinal Purposes.	53	%
(d) Government Sale of All Liquors - Meaning thereby, the Sale of all Liquors by or through Government Vendors. Beer to be consumed on Licensed Premises and in Private Residences. Wines and Spirits to be purchased in limited quantities under permit issued by the government, under Government Control and Regulations.	3,157	%
Total	4,914	100%
Spoiled ballots	307	

=== 1948 electrification plebiscite ===
District results from the first province wide plebiscite on electricity regulation.

Option A	Option B
Are you in favour of the generation and distribution of electricity being continued by the Power Companies?	Are you in favour of the generation and distribution of electricity being made a publicly owned utility administered by the Alberta Government Power Commission?
4,237 64.90%	2,291 35.10%
Province wide result: Option A passed.

=== 1957 liquor plebiscite ===
1957 Alberta liquor plebiscite results: Lethbridge
Question A: Do you approve additional types of outlets for the sale of beer, wine and spirituous liquor subject to a local vote?
Ballot choice	Votes	%
No	4,119	50.66%
Yes	4,012	49.34%
Total votes	8,131	100%
Rejected, spoiled and declined	66	
15,974 eligible electors, turnout 51.32%

On October 30, 1957, a stand-alone plebiscite was held province wide in all 50 of the then current provincial electoral districts in Alberta. The government decided to consult Alberta voters to decide on liquor sales and mixed drinking after a divisive debate in the Legislature. The plebiscite was intended to deal with the growing demand for reforming antiquated liquor control laws.

The plebiscite was conducted in two parts. Question A asked in all districts, asked the voters if the sale of liquor should be expanded in Alberta, while Question B asked in a handful of districts within the corporate limits of Calgary and Edmonton asked if men and woman were allowed to drink together in establishments.

Province wide Question A of the plebiscite passed in 33 of the 50 districts while Question B passed in all five districts. Lethbridge and Wetaskiwin were the only cities in Alberta to vote against the proposal. It was defeated by the narrowest margins with polls showing a clear split between the north and south sections of the city. The voter turnout in the district was well above the province wide average of 46% with well over half the electors turning out to vote.

Official district returns were released to the public on December 31, 1957. The Social Credit government in power at the time did not considered the results binding. However the results of the vote led the government to repeal all existing liquor legislation and introduce an entirely new Liquor Act.

Municipal districts lying inside electoral districts that voted against the Plebiscite such as Lethbridge were designated Local Option Zones by the Alberta Liquor Control Board and considered effective dry zones, business owners that wanted a licence had to petition for a binding municipal plebiscite in order to be granted a licence.

== See also ==
- List of Alberta provincial electoral districts
- Canadian provincial electoral districts
