= John Edward Brownlee sex scandal =

1934 scandal in Alberta, Canada

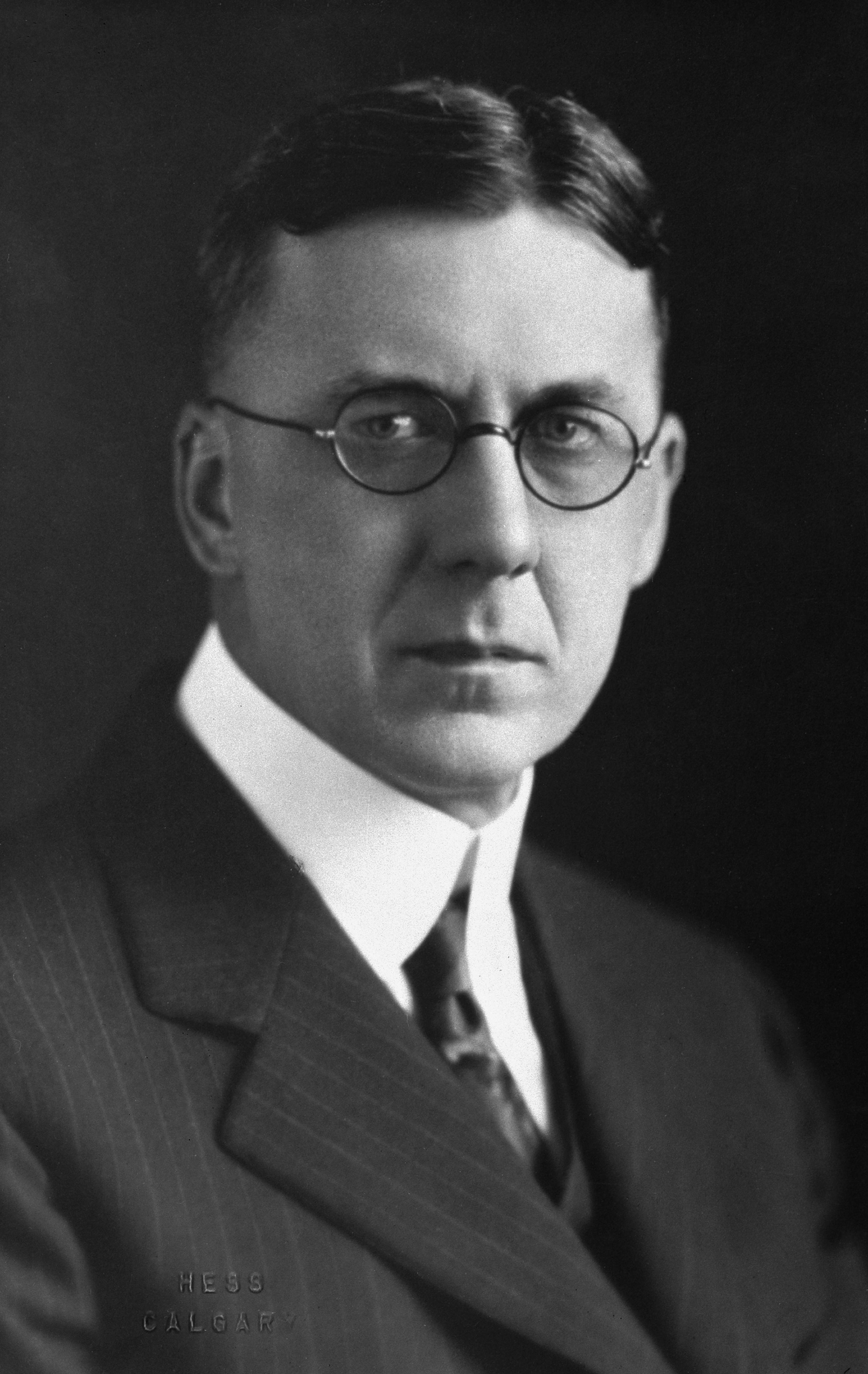
By the time of the scandal, John Edward Brownlee's once-promising premiership was already suffering the ravages of the Great Depression.

The John Brownlee sex scandal occurred in 1934 in Alberta, Canada, and forced the resignation of the provincial Premier, John Edward Brownlee. Brownlee was accused of seducing Vivian MacMillan, a family friend and a secretary for Brownlee's attorney-general in 1930, when she was 18 years old, and continuing the affair for three years. MacMillan claimed that the married premier had told her that she must have sex with him for his own sake and that of his invalid wife. She had, she testified, relented after physical and emotional pressure. Brownlee called her story a fabrication, and suggested that it was the result of a conspiracy by MacMillan, her would-be fiancé, and several of Brownlee's political opponents in the Alberta Liberal Party.

MacMillan and her father sued Brownlee for seduction. After a sensational trial in June 1934, the six-man jury found in favour of the plaintiffs, awarding them $10,000 and $5,000, respectively. In an unusual move, trial judge William Ives disregarded the jury's finding and dismissed the case. The Supreme Court of Canada eventually overturned the decision and awarded MacMillan $10,000 in damages. This award was affirmed by the Judicial Committee of the British Privy Council, Canada's highest court of appeal at the time. All of this was largely academic to Brownlee, who resigned after the jury's finding. During the next election, his United Farmers of Alberta were wiped out of the legislature, losing every seat.

== Background ==
John Brownlee became Premier of Alberta in 1925 as the leader of the parliamentary caucus of the United Farmers of Alberta (UFA). Early in his premiership, he achieved a number of successes, including winning control of the province's natural resources from the federal government, but by 1933 the Great Depression was taking its toll on his government's popularity. Political forces were advocating radical overhauls of the financial system. The Co-operative Commonwealth Federation and elements of the UFA's grassroots favored socialism and government ownership of the means of production, while the Alberta Liberal Party, many within the UFA, and William Aberhart's new provincial movement favored social credit, although in differing forms and with differing levels of enthusiasm.

In 1934, Brownlee was embroiled in a sex scandal, with major consequences to his political career. Those involved with the scandal gave widely disparate accounts of the surrounding facts; on only a minority of details did the parties agree. In 1930, Brownlee visited Edson while campaigning in the 1930 provincial election. While there, Allan MacMillan—the mayor of Edson and a political ally of Brownlee's—took him to a farmers' picnic. On the way to the event, Brownlee chatted with MacMillan's daughter, Vivian, then seventeen years old and unsure as to her future. The premier encouraged her to come to Edmonton and study business at Alberta College. She did so and, after graduating in June 1931, started working in the office of the provincial Attorney-General as a stenographer on July 3.

While in Edmonton, she became close to the Brownlee family. On July 5, 1933, while the rest of his family was vacationing at Sylvan Lake, Brownlee was taking MacMillan for a car ride when he noticed they were being followed. In the pursuing vehicle were John Caldwell, a suitor of MacMillan's and third-year medical student at the University of Alberta, and Neil MacLean, a prominent Edmonton lawyer and Liberal Party supporter who had been opposing counsel in the acrimonious and high profile divorce proceeding of Brownlee's Minister of Public Works, Oran McPherson. Brownlee made a series of sharp turns and reversals, in an effort to first ascertain whether he was indeed being followed and, once satisfied that he was, to evade the other car. Unable to do so, he dropped MacMillan off at her home and returned to his.

That August, Brownlee received a letter from MacLean reading in part "We have been instructed to commence action against you for damages for the seduction of Miss Vivian MacMillan." Later that month, he took advantage of a recess in the federal Royal Commission on Banking and Currency, of which he was a member, to visit Allan MacMillan in Edson. He spoke instead to Mrs. MacMillan, who initially refused to let him into the house and asked him to leave. She eventually relented and let him in; he told her that pursuing the matter could ruin Vivian's future, to which she responded "what about you?" Concluding that the meeting was pointless, Brownlee parted by announcing "I am not asking you to refrain from your action, but I want to tell you that the allegation is not true and I will face them frankly and answer any questions ... If its [sic] money you are after, I haven't got it."

On September 22, MacLean filed a statement of claim before Judge John R. Boyle on behalf of Allan and Vivian MacMillan. The claim was made under the Alberta Seduction Act, and sought damages of $10,000 for Vivian and $5,000 for Allan. It alleged that Brownlee, after arranging for Vivian's move from Edson to Edmonton, had seduced her in the fall of 1930 when she was eighteen, and had had regular sexual contact with her for a period of three years. Brownlee denied the allegations immediately (and made a rejected offer to resign from the Royal Commission) and on November 13 filed a counter-claim against Vivian MacMillan and John Caldwell, alleging that they had conspired to obtain money through false allegations.

== Vivian MacMillan's story ==
According to Vivian MacMillan, when she met Brownlee in 1930 he told her that she would "grow up to be a beautiful woman", urged her to move to Edmonton, and offered to arrange a government job for her. He further offered to act as guardian to her and allow her to live in his house until she found a place of her own. On his advice and assurances, she moved to Edmonton and, after graduating from Alberta College, received the stenographer's position that she claimed had been arranged for her by the premier.

Immediately after her arrival in Edmonton, she said, Brownlee had telephoned her—commenting that "a little birdie" had told him that she was in town—and invited her to his home to meet his family; she soon became a regular visitor there. She alleged that in October 1930, while Brownlee was driving her home after one such visit, the premier took her hand and asked her what she knew "about life". On her response that she knew probably as much as any girl of eighteen, he invited her out the next evening for what she presumed would be some advice. Instead, he drove her 6 miles (9.7 km) west of town on Highway 16 and parked on a side road before asking her to have sex with him. He said that he had been madly in love with her from the start, that he was lonely, that he and his wife had not lived together as man and wife in a long time, that his wife (an invalid) would be endangered by a pregnancy, and that he could not be premier any longer unless MacMillan agreed to have sex with him. He told her that if she refused him, he would be forced to resume his sexual relationship with his wife, and that this would likely kill her. MacMillan reacted fearfully, and asked if there was anything else she could do to help Brownlee and his wife; he replied that there was not.

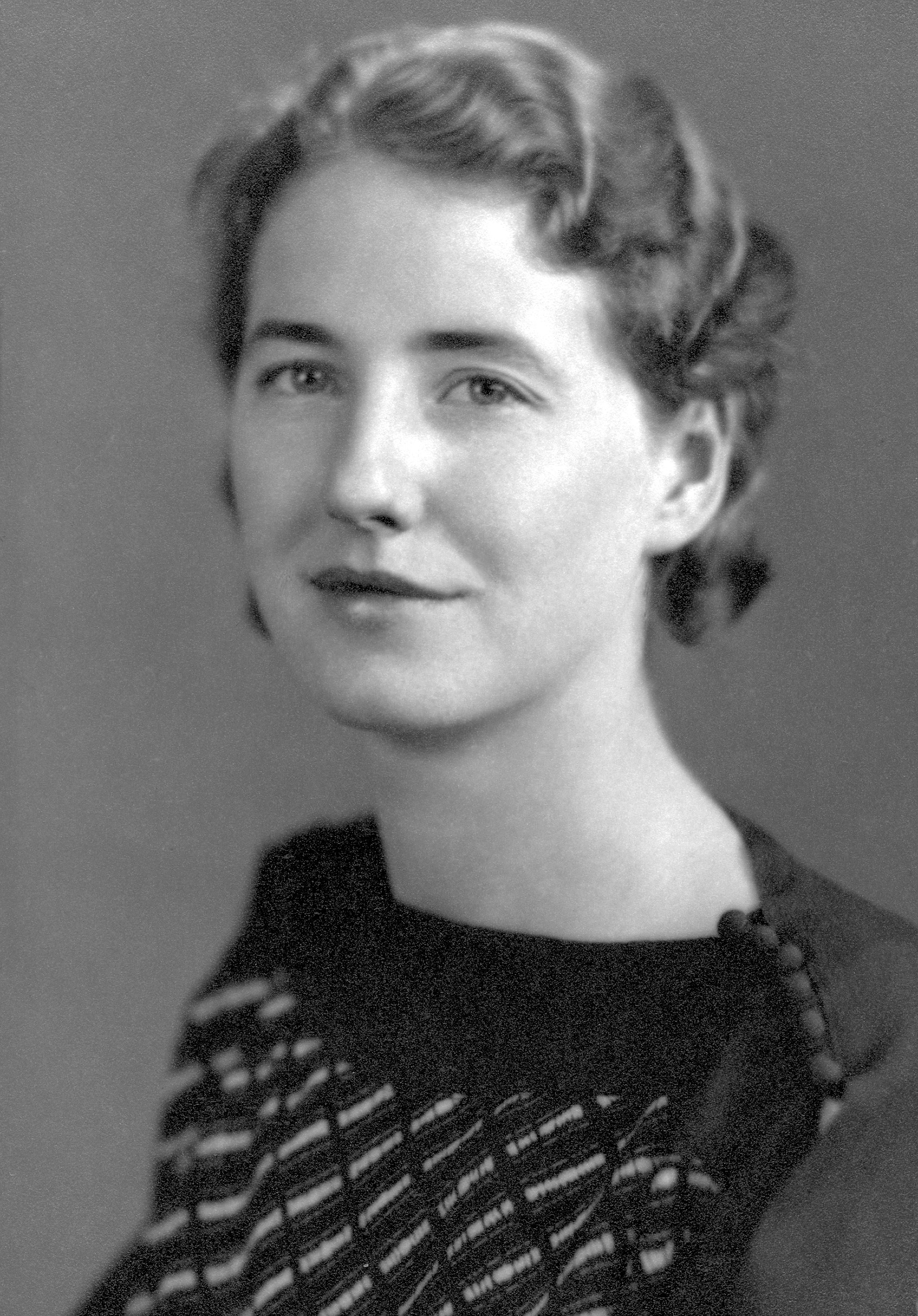
Vivian MacMillan, the woman at the centre of the scandal

The next week on another ride home, a similar conversation ensued, this one culminating in Brownlee forcing a resisting MacMillan into the car's back seat where he partially penetrated her against her will. Two weeks later, she alleged, they had complete consensual intercourse. After, when she expressed concern about becoming pregnant, he told her that "he knew of some pills that he would give me and if I took them at the end of each month before I menstruated that they would be very safe and there would not be any danger of me becoming pregnant." MacMillan recounted that their relationship continued in this way, with sex occurring an average of three times per week. In September 1931, she stayed in the Brownlee house for three days while Mrs. Brownlee was in Vancouver; she alleged that during that time, Brownlee had his son, who usually slept in Brownlee's room, transferred to a different room so that Brownlee and MacMillan could have sex.

Some of MacMillan's most sensational allegations concerned a six-week period in the spring of 1932 when she was filling in at the Brownlee household for an absent maid. She said that she slept in the maid's room, one of three bedrooms on the second floor of Brownlee's house; a second room was occupied by Brownlee and his son Jack, and the third by Florence Brownlee and her son Alan. During this six-week period, she claimed, she and Brownlee had had sex every night; Brownlee would signal her to leave her room by turning on the tap in the second floor bathroom, and then flush the toilet and walk in lockstep with her to mask the sound of her movement. Once in the premier's room, they would have sex next to his sleeping son, taking care to be quiet. She recounted how on one occasion Jack had seemed to stir, and Brownlee had turned on the light in the middle of intercourse to make sure that his son was all right.

MacMillan said that during the summer of 1932 she experienced a nervous breakdown (for which Florence Brownlee paid the hospital bills), and that she met and fell in love with Caldwell soon after. She resolved to end her affair with Brownlee but he reacted angrily, telling her that it would mean his wife's death and MacMillan's inability to find a job anywhere in Alberta. That evening, she confided the affair to her landlady. On October 31, 1932, she had dinner with Brownlee's sons and visited Brownlee, who was sick in bed. Despite her protestations that she was on her way to a Halloween party with Caldwell, he insisted that they have sex, which they did. Thereafter, the affair resumed. On another occasion, he called her away from her visiting mother to have sex with him at the legislature building.

In late January 1933, Caldwell proposed to her. She broke down and told him of the affair. She described his reaction as sympathetic, though he rescinded the marriage proposal. In May, at Caldwell's urging, she consulted a lawyer, but continued the affair until July 5, the night of the fateful drive.

MacMillan testified that for the duration of the affair she continued to have sex with Brownlee "from terror and because he told me it was my duty to do it and he seemed to have an influence over me which I could not break." She claimed that there had been no love accompanying the sex, and that it had been physically painful for her on each occasion.

== John Brownlee's story ==
Brownlee denied absolutely MacMillan's claims. He said that there had been no sexual activity between him and MacMillan, likening their relationship instead to that of an uncle and his favourite niece. To claims that he had induced MacMillan to move to Edmonton and arranged a position for her in the Attorney General's office, he asserted "in the thirteen years I have been in public life I have never promised any person in this Province a position." He denied having convinced MacMillan to move to Edmonton and stated that he had not even known that she had done so until Christopher Pattinson, Member of the Legislative Assembly (MLA) for Edson, told him. He further claimed that his sex life with Mrs. Brownlee was what he would consider normal for a husband and wife (which was corroborated by his wife).

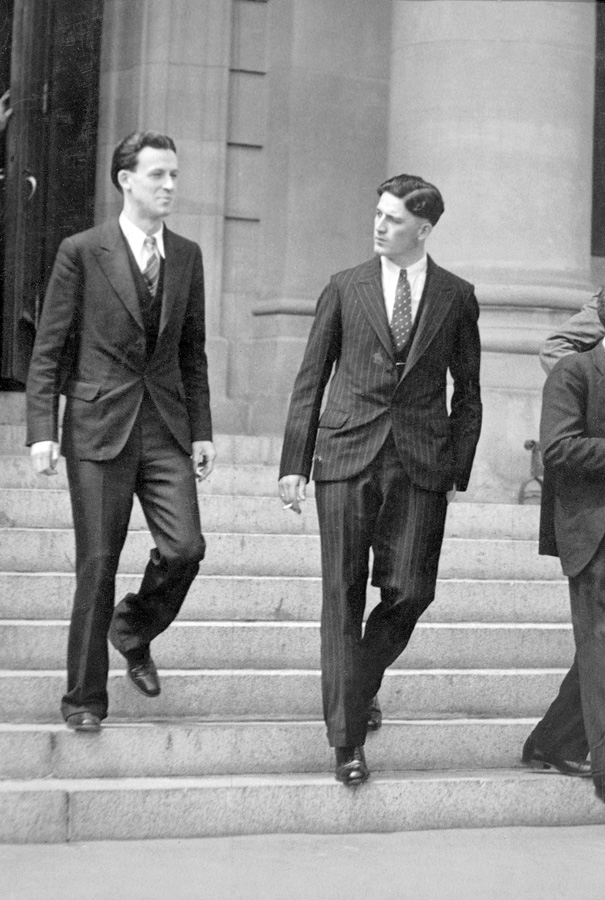
John Caldwell and Sam MacMillan, Vivian's brother, at the courthouse

He acknowledged that he had been driving MacMillan around the evening of July 5, 1933, when he was followed by Caldwell and MacLean, but gave a dramatically different account of his reasons for doing so. According to him, there had been talk of MacMillan joining his family at their rental cottage at Sylvan Lake that weekend provided that she could get the necessary time off work, and that evening he called her to see whether or not she had been able to. During the ensuing phone conversation, MacMillan told him that she had other problems bothering her, and asked if Brownlee would take her for a drive to discuss them. He agreed to do so, and it was during this drive that he noticed that he was being followed.

In support of this story, Brownlee pointed to investigational work by Harry Brace, a private detective in the employ of Attorney General John Lymburn. According to Brace, Caldwell had told at least three witnesses that he expected to soon receive a large amount of money from someone "high up in political life". He also specifically told one of Brace's agents that he had deliberately set out to frame Brownlee, that in selecting Neil MacLean as his lawyer he had deliberately chosen a Liberal (the Liberals were considered the major opposition to Brownlee's government at the time), and that if the Liberals won the next election there would be "nothing I want I won't be able to get". Disappointingly for Brownlee, Brace did not uncover evidence that MacMillan was lying about the affair itself: Caldwell, based on his comments to Brace's men, seemed very much under the impression that the affair had occurred exactly as claimed. Moreover, Brace found that Carl Snell, MacMillan's one-time suitor, claimed to have been told in 1932 that MacMillan was having a consensual affair with the premier.

Brownlee's defenders called into doubt MacLean's motivation for involvement in the case: according to rumour, MacLean had been involved in a drunk driving incident several years previous in which he had driven his car into a ditch. When another motorist had pulled him out, MacLean had attempted unsuccessfully to drive away with the chains still attached to his vehicle, for which he was charged. He had reputedly asked Brownlee, then the Attorney General, to have the charges dropped. Upon Brownlee's refusal, he had allegedly vowed to "get" him. Finally, Brownlee made a point of noting that, as a medical student, Caldwell would have been well-positioned to coach MacMillan on her claims about the pills she was taking to avoid pregnancy. According to Brownlee, the events alleged were a complete fabrication, the result of scheming by an opportunistic young medical student and his impressionable girlfriend, encouraged by a vindictive lawyer and unscrupulous political opponents.

== Legal processes ==
=== Trial ===
The trial began in June 1934 before Justice William Ives with three days of testimony from MacMillan. Brownlee's lawyer, Arthur LeRoy Smith, used his cross examination to call into question almost everything MacMillan said. To refute her claim that Brownlee had convinced her to move to Edmonton, he entered into evidence a letter she had written to Alberta College seeking information on its programs, dated before she had even met Brownlee. He further demonstrated that on the evening of the seduction, which had allegedly taken place in a car on a side road west of Edmonton, the city had been engulfed in a blizzard. Moreover, the government car in which the seduction was supposed to have taken place had not been purchased until more than a year after that date. In response to her testimony that she had always slept in the maid's room while staying with the Brownlees, Smith produced letters showing that she had actually slept in Mrs. Brownlee's room. After MacMillan conceded her mistake, Smith noted that Mrs. Brownlee's room had a large deadbolt on the door: if she had feared Brownlee, why had she not used it? "Because I just did as Mr. Brownlee said," was the plaintiff's response. MacMillan, when questioned, admitted that the period during which she had been staying in the Brownlee home in the spring of 1932, which she had initially placed at six weeks, was actually only four. When she identified these four weeks as the last two weeks of April and the first two of May, Smith showed that Brownlee had been out of town for all but ten nights of that period.

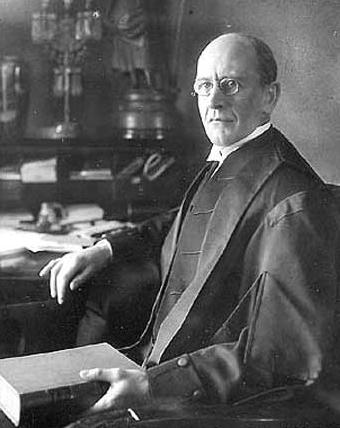
Justice W. C. Ives presided over the trial and ultimately overturned the jury's verdict against Brownlee.

Other witnesses for the plaintiffs included a former maid of Brownlee's, who testified that she had seen the premier pick MacMillan up in his car late one night, and MacMillan's landlady's daughter, who testified that she found MacMillan sobbing in her room one night. Allan MacMillan was also called: though he testified that Brownlee had encouraged his daughter to move to Edmonton and promised to forward information about Alberta College, he acknowledged that the premier had not followed through and not contacted her again until she was in Edmonton.

The defence called Brownlee, who recounted his version of events. He testified that he had been otherwise occupied on many of the days that he and MacMillan had supposedly had sex; in one case, he produced newspaper stories showing that he had been making a speech in Stettler at a time that MacMillan had claimed he was forcing himself upon her in Edmonton. In another, he testified that he was meeting with O. H. Snow, the mayor of Raymond. MacLean on cross-examination tried to paint Brownlee as a man of tremendous persuasive powers, recalling his time as a lawyer in Calgary, only to have Brownlee retort that he had only ever tried two cases, spending most of his time drafting commercial documents. MacLean also emphasized the $1,400 that Lymburn as Attorney General had spent investigating the case, suggesting that this amounted to government funds being spent to vindicate Brownlee personally; outside of the courtroom, Lymburn responded that his office had received a complaint that an "Edmonton lawyer"—taken by all involved to be MacLean—had approached a young woman offering money to place Brownlee in a compromising position, and that, as a criminal allegation, it had been the obligation of his office to investigate. He further emphasized that, against his protestations, Brownlee had insisted on reimbursing the government for the full cost of the investigation.

After the premier's testimony was completed, Smith called his wife, Florence Brownlee. She supported her husband's account of MacMillan's relationship with the Brownlee family and reported that, when the premier drove MacMillan home at night, he was very seldom late returning. On cross-examination, she denied that she would have defended her husband if she believed him to be guilty. Additional witnesses for the defence included Brownlee's personal secretary, Civil Service Commissioner Frederick Smailes, and four legislature janitors. Smailes acknowledged knowing at the time of MacMillan's hiring that she was acquainted with Brownlee, but denied involvement on Brownlee's part in the decision to hire her, while the janitors denied ever seeing a young woman enter the premier's office in the evenings. Jessie Ellergert, who had worked for the Brownlees as a maid, said that she had no reason to believe that there was a sexual relationship between the premier and MacMillan; moreover, she specifically recalled the Halloween night MacMillan had referred to in her testimony, and testified that the household was far too bustling for the alleged sex to have occurred.

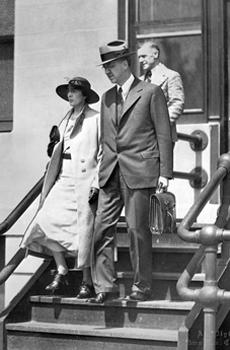
John and Florence Brownlee leaving the courthouse

The trial concluded with a field trip, as the jury went to view both Brownlee's house and two stretches of road where MacMillan had claimed key encounters took place. Rainy weather meant that on more than one occasion the jurors and lawyers had to push cars out of the mud. Though one road essentially matched MacMillan's description, it was located next to a populated settlement rather than deserted as she had claimed. The other, in contrast to her description of it as a side road, was a busy highway. Upon the jury's return, Smith surprised them by announcing that Brownlee's counter-claim was being dropped; he said that there was no need to complicate the clear cut issue of "seduction or no seduction" with evidence about a conspiracy on the part of MacMillan and Caldwell. Legal historian Patrick Brode criticized this decision, suggesting that the jury was expecting proof of a conspiracy and that, when this proof was not forthcoming, Brownlee's credibility was hurt.

Besides the factual issues that the jury was called on to adjudicate, there was a legal issue of what constituted "seduction" under the law. The basis of the claim was a two-hundred-year-old tort which allowed a man to sue anybody who impregnated his female servant. The basis for damages under such a claim was the servant's inability to perform her duties to the detriment of the employer. The tort was later broadened to allow the seductee's father to sue; only in statute in 1903 was the law amended to give standing to the woman herself. At issue was what damage, if any, she needed to show in order to have a cause of action. The defence argued that in all precedents there had been a pregnancy resulting, and that without one the plaintiffs could not claim damages. In response, MacLean emphasized the not entirely consensual nature of the alleged relationship. Brownlee himself responded that if the alleged relationship had been non-consensual, he should have been charged under the criminal law for rape, not sued for seduction; that the plaintiffs had not attempted to press criminal charges was evidence, he believed, of their bad faith and financial motivation.

After six days of testimony, closing arguments were given: Smith's lasted two hours and fifteen minutes and emphasized the discrepancies in MacMillan's story. MacLean's was a relatively brief forty minutes, in which he argued that the improbable and fantastic nature of his client's tale was evidence that she could not possibly have invented it. Ives then instructed the jurors, and defined "seduction" as "inducing a woman to part with her virtue ... [which] may be by any artful device that brings about her consent." After four hours and forty minutes the jury returned and announced its finding that Brownlee had seduced MacMillan in October 1930 when he had partially penetrated her, and that both she and her father had suffered damage in the amounts claimed. Ives immediately announced that he strongly disagreed with the jury's findings, and that "the evidence does not warrant them". On July 2, he issued his written ruling, overturning the jury's verdict and dismissing the action; his reason for doing so was what he viewed as the lack of damage being demonstrated by the plaintiffs. According to Ives, even if the facts had been exactly as MacMillan had described, as a matter of law the plaintiffs could not claim damages without a pregnancy or an illness.

=== Media and public reception ===
The trial was covered in lurid detail, especially by the Edmonton Bulletin, which called it "the greatest drama ever to be heard in an Alberta court". The Bulletin was a Liberal paper, and MacLean had given it an advance copy of his statement of claim, which allowed MacMillan's allegations to be published and disseminated before the statement of claim was filed. The Bulletin was emphatically sympathetic to MacMillan in its coverage, and printed her detailed testimony (which included the dates and times of specific encounters) almost verbatim. Under the headline "Vivian Testifies to Harrowing Ordeal", it praised the young plaintiff as "bearing up with wonderful fortitude" and facing the ordeal "with courageous mien". Brownlee, in contrast, was a "love-torn, sex crazed victim of passion and jealousy, forcing his will upon her in parked autos and on country highways". The jury was not sequestered and was free to read these accounts. Edmontonians were no less enthralled than their newspaper, and many showed up to the courthouse early on the days of trial, hoping to get a seat. Towards the end of the trial, Ives revoked the Bulletin's press privileges at the trial and fined its publisher $300 and a reporter $100 for publishing writing "likely to inflame public opinion and interfere with the even-handed course of justice."

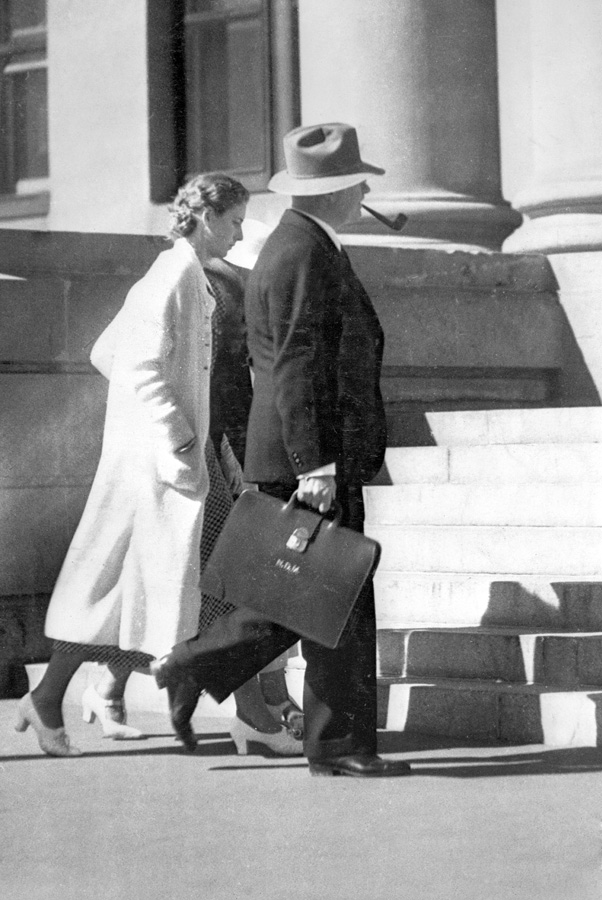
Vivian MacMillan arriving at court with a man variously identified as Neil MacLean and Allan MacMillan

Media attention on the trial spread beyond the provincial and national borders: Time magazine published at least two articles on the trial in the United States, and the Daily Mail and Paris Midi covered it from across the Atlantic.

Reaction to the trial's outcome was mixed. The Bulletin was outraged, as was the Canadian Civil Liberties Protective Association, which called Ives' decision to overturn the jury's finding one that "set the clock back 300 years". Both organized subscriptions to finance an expected appeal. The Winnipeg Free Press called for an investigation of Ives for apparent favouritism towards Brownlee. The Vancouver Sun, on the other hand, sympathized with the premier, arguing that his "personal difficulties should not have been aired publicly". Brownlee's political allies, including Irene Parlby and Henry Wise Wood, remained loyal, with Wood keeping a large picture of Brownlee on the wall of his guest bedroom.

=== Appeals ===
The plaintiffs appealed and the case went before the Alberta Supreme Court appeals division in January 1935. On February 2, by a 3–2 decision, the court upheld Ives' ruling. The majority ruling by Chief Justice Horace Harvey cast serious doubts on MacMillan's credibility, calling her story "quite unsupported by other evidence" and noting that she "showed a readiness to admit that she may have been mistaken as regards very positive statements previously made when by the questions it appeared there may be independent evidence she was wrong". In addition to agreeing with Ives on the points of law, he felt that the jury had not based its finding of fact on the evidence in the case. Justices Mitchell and Ford concurred. Justice Clarke, in dissent, agreed that MacMillan's story was unlikely, but expressed a willingness to defer to the jury on questions of fact. On the legal questions, he cited a precedent written by Justice Harvey himself in which the chief justice had argued that the inclusion of seduced women as potential plaintiffs under the Seduction Act proved that its framers intended a broader definition of damage than financial damage. Justice Lunney concurred. The court was unanimous in upholding Ives' dismissal of Allan MacMillan's action, and he did not appeal further.

Not satisfied with the verdict, the Bulletin again organized a campaign to fund an appeal, which was submitted to the Supreme Court of Canada; on March 1, 1937, Ives' decision was overturned. Chief Justice Lyman Duff, writing for the majority, accepted the jury's finding of fact and, echoing Justice Clarke, concluded that the framers of the Alberta Seduction Act had not intended that damage to a seductee be required to be the same as those to her father or employer (i.e. financial) in order to be actionable. The court ordered Brownlee to pay $10,000 in damages to MacMillan, plus trial costs. Henry Hague Davis in dissent focussed less on the questions of law and more on the evidence in the case, and argued that the jury's finding of fact was perverse and that the appeal should be dismissed.

After the Supreme Court ruling, Brownlee settled with MacMillan, but still desired to clear his name. On July 1, 1937, the federal government by Order in Council gave him leave to appeal to the Judicial Committee of the British Privy Council, at the time Canada's highest court of appeal. On March 11 and 12, 1940, the committee heard Brownlee's appeal. It was dismissed on June 4 that year, as the committee endorsed the Supreme Court of Canada's focus on statutory interpretation.

== Legacy ==
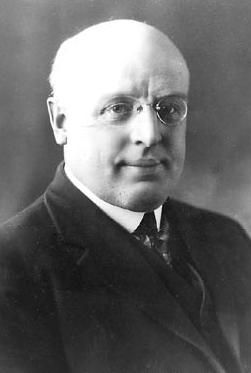
After Brownlee's resignation, William Aberhart swept to power in the next election.

For John Brownlee's political career, Ives' ruling and the subsequent appeals were irrelevant: once the jury ruled in MacMillan's favour, he immediately announced that he would resign as soon as a replacement could be found. On July 10, 1934, he was succeeded as Premier by Richard Gavin Reid, his government's Treasurer and Minister of Health and Municipal Affairs. Brownlee stayed on as MLA and sought to retain his Ponoka seat in the 1935 provincial election, but was trounced by Edith Rogers of William Aberhart's Alberta Social Credit League. Not a single UFA member won re-election as Aberhart's movement and its promises of innovative solutions to the western world's economic problems rode to a decisive victory. In evaluating Social Credit's victory, historians unanimously cite the province's dire economic straits as the main factor, though University of Alberta historian David Elliott has acknowledged that "Aberhart and his cause were also helped" by the seduction scandal. This view has been endorsed by University of Western Ontario sociologist Edward Bell. John Barr, in his history of the Alberta Social Credit Party, is more dismissive, calling it "unlikely" that the scandal was a major factor in the UFA's defeat.

Brode acknowledges that the question of whether Brownlee seduced MacMillan "defies any definitive answer" but says that the evidence presented in the trial did not justify a finding that he did, and speculates that if MacMillan had brought her suit in a later generation she would have been "laughed out of court". Lakeland College historian and Brownlee biographer Franklin Foster does not take a position on whether or not Brownlee was guilty of seduction, but hints that a likely truth might lie "between the two extremes" of the parties' claims: that Brownlee and MacMillan did have a consensual affair which was then highjacked and exploited by the premier's more opportunistic and vengeful opponents. He leaves little doubt that he considers the behaviour of the Edmonton Bulletin and of the Liberal Party, especially its leader, William R. Howson, to have been profoundly unethical. Athabasca University historian Alvin Finkel has criticized Foster for being too friendly towards Brownlee, saying that he does not consider the scandal sufficiently from MacMillan's perspective.

A play at the 2008 Edmonton International Fringe Festival, Respecting the Action for Seduction: The Brownlee Affair, was based on the scandal, and received average to above average reviews.

After leaving office, John Brownlee returned to the practice of law. He died in 1961. Vivian MacMillan stayed out of the limelight. She did not marry Caldwell, and returned to Edson, where on August 7, 1935, she wed confectioner Henry Sorenson.. Henry left Vivian around 1940. After an affair, she married her boss, Frank Howie, in 1955. Vivian Howie died in 1980.
