= Montague Aldous =

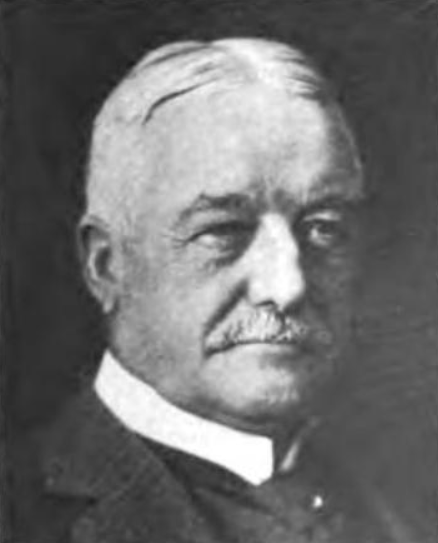
- Born: September 30, 1850; Charlottetown, Prince Edward Island, British North America
- Died: May 25, 1946 (aged 95); Winnipeg, Manitoba
- Education: Bowdoin College; Prince of Wales College
- Spouse: Mary Agnes Bate

Montague Aldous (September 30, 1850 – May 25, 1946) was a Dominion Topographical Surveyor from Charlottetown, Prince Edward Island. He was a participant in foundation surveys of the Northwest Territories. He was associated with A.L. Russell in 1877 in a survey west to the third meridian. In 1878 he subdivided Prince Albert, Saskatchewan. Taken on Special Survey in 1879, he surveyed the fourth meridian to a point north of Lloydminster, Alberta/Saskatchewan, then ran in the 14th base line west to Stony Plain where it intersected the 5th meridian. His assistant, Charles Alexander Magrath, was later the first mayor of Lethbridge, Northwest Territories (now Alberta). In 1880 Aldous surveyed the fifth meridian south to Waterton Lakes. He spent the rest of the summer in southern Alberta's Porcupine Hills, then being taken up for ranching.

Aldous accepted a job offer from the Hudson's Bay Company (HBC) in 1882 and soon had seven survey parties working frantically to keep up with the demand for HBC farm lots. Later he served as the HBC Timber Agent and was Chief Clerk of the HBC Land Department from 1901 to 1907.

In February 1885 he was sent to the Belly River (now known as the Oldman River) coal district where the North Western Coal and Navigation Company had opened mines. He inspected about 25,000 acres (100 km^{2}) of HBC lands in the vicinity as well as the 500,000-acre (2,000 km^{2}) land grant to be given to the Galt Company for building the Dunmore-Lethbridge narrow gauge railway. The Galt Company paid Aldous' expenses; part of its agreement with him that he would survey the new Lethbridge prairie level town site.

He worked from sketches which Elliot Torrence Galt, general manager of the coal company, had prepared (likely with assistance from his father) in January 1885 or earlier. Aldous completed the Lethbridge survey in March and prepared detailed plans. Town lots were available for sale by May 9. The prairie level town began to take shape on August 1 and, by December 31, 1,200 people had settled in the new community.

Montague Aldous died in Winnipeg on May 25, 1946.
