= Hans Wight =

Canadian politician (1889–1965)

Hans Enoch Wight
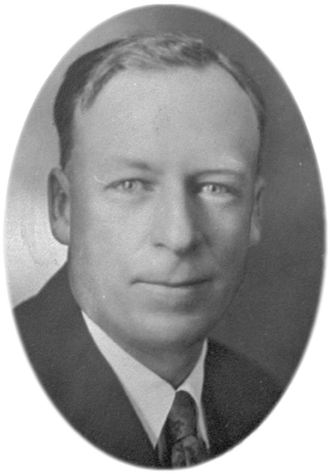

Member of the Legislative Assembly of Alberta
- In office August 22, 1935 – September 2, 1937
- Preceded by: Andrew Smeaton
- Succeeded by: Peter Campbell
- Constituency: Lethbridge

Personal details
- Born: July 29, 1889 Hyrum, Utah
- Died: October 12, 1965 (aged 76) Salt Lake City, Utah
- Party: Social Credit
- Occupation: politician

Hans Enoch Wight was a provincial politician from Alberta, Canada. He served as a member of the Legislative Assembly of Alberta from 1935 to 1937 sitting with the Social Credit caucus in government.

== Political career ==
Wight ran for a seat to the Alberta Legislature as a Social Credit candidate in the electoral district of Lethbridge in the 1935 Alberta general election. He defeated incumbent Andrew Smeaton and two other candidates with a landslide majority to pick up the seat for his party.

The Lethbridge Herald broke a story on August 25, 1937, saying that Wight was imminently to resign his seat. On the same front page, the paper also broke the news that William Chant was to leave the Social Credit caucus. The newspaper had come under attack by Social Credit supporters, forcing the paper to issue a news story standing by its claims the next day. Wight had denied that he had given information about any plan to resign.

Seven days later, Wight made his formal announcement of resignation to the media on September 2, 1937, giving as his reason acceptance of a job as an engineer at a department store in Calgary. He sent his resignation letter to speaker Peter Dawson by mail. Wight's resignation caused a controversy as more than a week after Wight announced his resignation the government was claiming that he hadn't resigned. After weeks of turmoil and charges of grandstanding and claims that the government was afraid of losing a by-election, the government finally announced that it had accepted Wight's resignation on September 14, 1937.
