= Peter M. Campbell =

Canadian politician

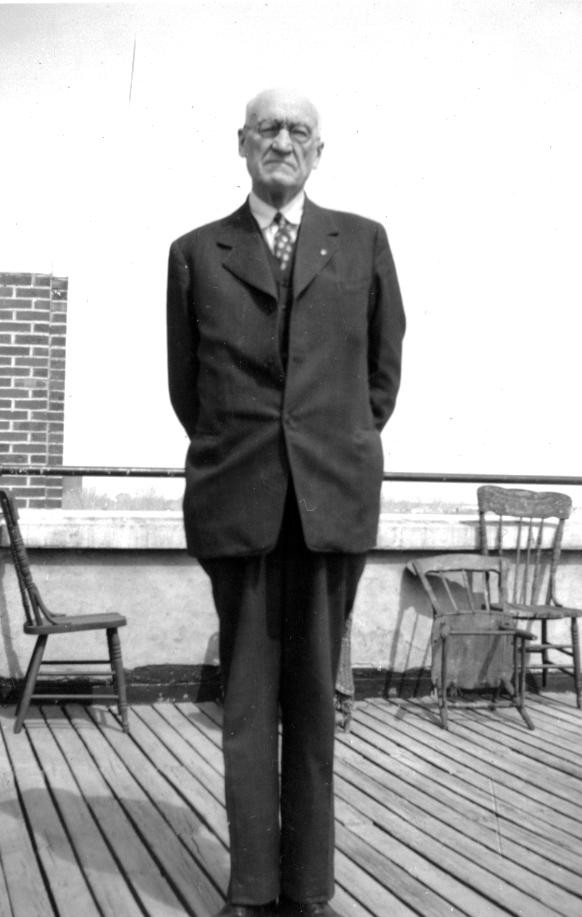

Member of the Legislative Assembly of Alberta
- In office 1937–1944
- Preceded by: Hans Wight
- Succeeded by: John Landeryou
- Constituency: Lethbridge

Personal details
- Born: February 9, 1872 Admaston, Ontario
- Died: September 19, 1954 (aged 82) Vancouver, British Columbia
- Party: None (Independent)
- Occupation: doctor

Peter McGregor Campbell (February 9, 1872 – September 19, 1954) was a Canadian physician and provincial politician from Alberta. He served as a member of the Legislative Assembly of Alberta from 1940 to 1944, sitting as an Independent member from the constituency of Lethbridge.

== Early life ==
Peter McGregor Campbell was born February 9, 1872, at Admaston, Ontario, to John Campbell and Jane Connery. He was educated at Renfrew High School and later attended Queen's University at Kingston where he completed his medical studies in 1896. Campbell married Esther Scott on April 29, 1904, and had one child, Winnifred Jean Scott. Campbell would practice in Cardston, Alberta for a period of time before moving to Lethbridge in December 1906.

== Political life ==
Campbell entered provincial politics by contesting and winning the Lethbridge electoral district in a 1937 by-election following the controversial resignation of Hans Wight. Campbell was elected as a member of the Independent Citizen's Association which opposed the policies of the governing Social Credit party. Campbell was subsequently re-elected 1940 Alberta general election defeating Social Credit candidate A. E. Smith. Campbell did not contest the 1944 Alberta general election.

== Later life ==
In 1954, Peter McGregor Campbell received an honorary degree from the University of Alberta. He died on September 19, 1954, in Vancouver, British Columbia, at the age of 82.
