= Lethbridge District =

Defunct provincial electoral district in Alberta, Canada

Alberta electoral district

Defunct provincial electoral district
- Legislature: Legislative Assembly of Alberta
- District created: 1909
- District abolished: 1913
- First contested: 1909
- Last contested: 1910

Lethbridge District was a provincial electoral district in Alberta, Canada, mandated to return a single member to the Legislative Assembly of Alberta using the first-past-the-post method of voting from 1909 to 1913.

== History ==
The Lethbridge District was created prior to the 1909 provincial election from the Lethbridge electoral district, which was split into Lethbridge City and the Lethbridge district. At the 1909 Liberal convention, Dr. John H. Rivers, the Mayor of Raymond was selected as the Liberal candidate over W. W. Douglas, the Mayor of Taber.

Lethbridge District was short-lived, however, when prior to the 1913 Alberta general election, it was split into Little Bow and Taber electoral districts.

== Election results ==
=== 1909 ===
1909 Alberta general election
Party	Candidate	Votes	%	±%
Independent Liberal	Archibald J. McLean	791	56.06%	–
Liberal	John H. Rivers	620	43.94%	–
Total		1,411	–	–
Rejected, spoiled and declined		N/A	–	–
Eligible electors / turnout		N/A	N/A	–
Source(s) Source: "Lethbridge District Official Results 1909 Alberta general election". Alberta Heritage Community Foundation.

=== 1910 by-election ===
Alberta provincial by-election, June 22, 1910 Ministerial by-election upon Archibald J. McLean's appointment as Provincial Secretary on June 1, 1910
Party	Candidate	Votes	%	±%
Liberal	Archibald J. McLean	Acclaimed	–	–
Total		N/A	–	–
Rejected, spoiled and declined		N/A	–	–
Eligible electors / turnout		N/A	N/A	–
Liberal hold		Swing		–
Source(s) "By-elections". Elections Alberta.

== By-election reasons ==
- June 22, 1910 — Sitting member A.J. McLean accepted office in provincial ministry, crossed the floor to the Liberal party.

== See also ==
- List of Alberta provincial electoral districts
- Canadian provincial electoral districts
