= John Smith Stewart =

Canadian politician and Brigadier general

Brigadier-General (Ret'd) John Smith Stewart CMG DSO
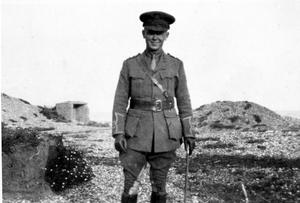

Member of the Canada Parliament for Lethbridge
- In office 28 July 1930 – 13 October 1935
- Preceded by: Lincoln Henry Jelliff
- Succeeded by: John Horne Blackmore

Member of the Legislative Assembly of Alberta for Lethbridge Lethbridge City (1911–1921)
- In office October 31, 1911 – January 1, 1925
- Preceded by: William Ashbury Buchanan
- Succeeded by: Andrew Smeaton

Personal details
- Born: 18 May 1878 Brampton, Ontario, Canada
- Died: 14 August 1970 (aged 92)
- Party: Conservative
- Profession: Dentist, teacher

Military service
- Allegiance: Canada
- Branch/service: Canadian Militia; Canadian Expeditionary Force
- Years of service: 1899–1918
- Rank: Brigadier-general

John Smith Stewart, CMG DSO (18 May 1878 – 14 August 1970) was a Canadian politician and brigadier-general from Alberta.

== Early life ==
John Smith Stewart was born 16 May 1878 in Brampton, Ontario, to John Stewart and Mary Armstrong. Stewart moved to Edmonton at the age of 19 in 1896. Stewart later studied dentistry at University of Toronto, completing his studies in 1903. He moved to Lethbridge and married Jean McClure on 25 September 1907; she died in 1914. Stewart was appointed to the board of the newly established University of Alberta in 1909.

== Military career ==
Stewart's military career began as a private in Strathcona's Horse during the Second Boer War. During this time he served under Lieutenant-Colonel Sam Steele, and earned the Queen's South Africa Medal with four clasps. Stewart received his commission, completing his studies at the Royal Military College of Canada in February 1908 to form the 25th Artillery Battery.

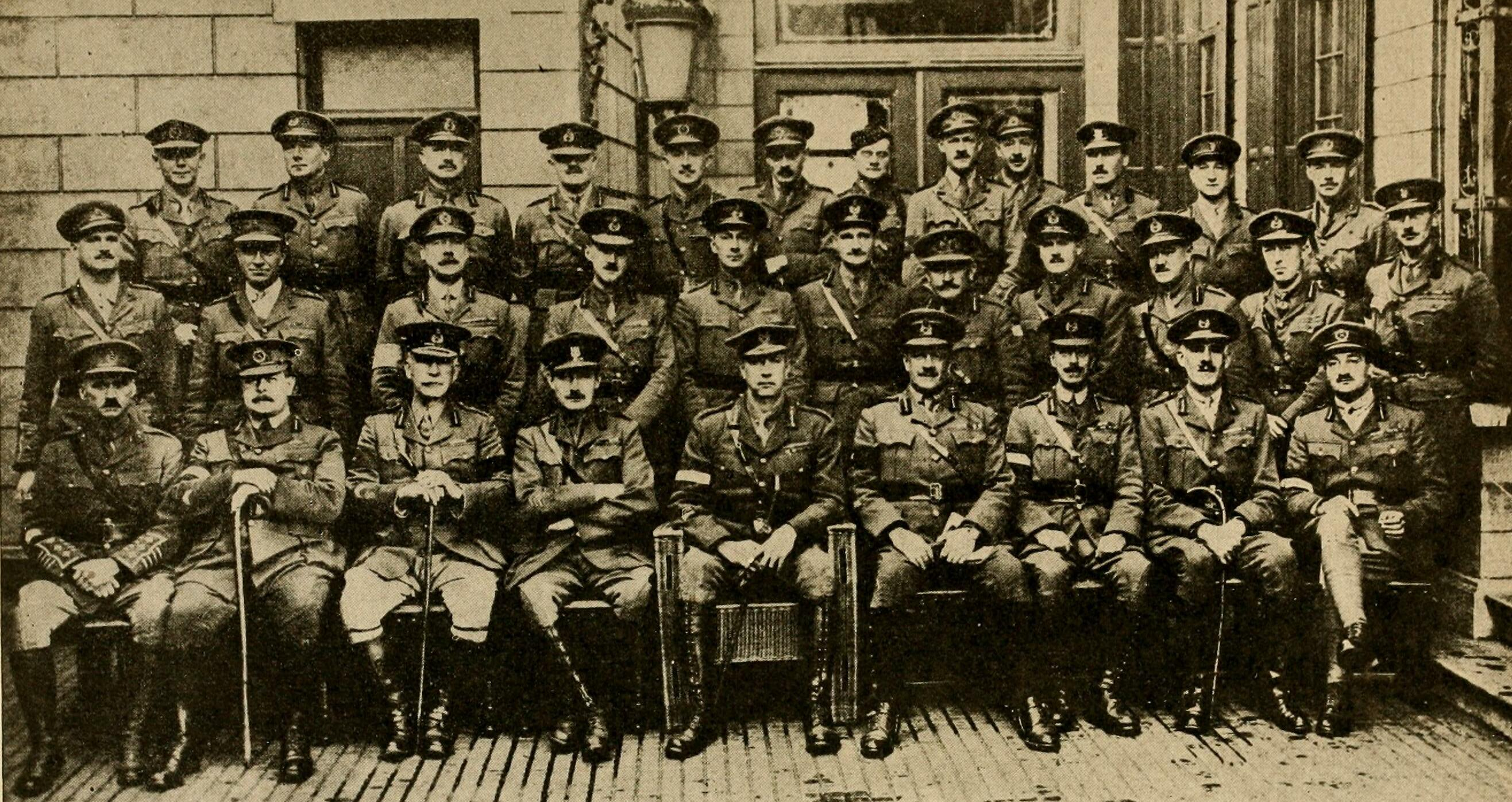
Lieutenant General Sir Arthur Currie with Prince Arthur of Connaught and other senior officers. Brigadier General J. S. Stewart is in the back row, first on the left.

On the outbreak of the First World War, Stewart was asked to command the 20th Artillery Battery from Lethbridge, and was promoted to lieutenant-colonel before going overseas on 9 August 1915. He was eventually promoted to brigadier-general on 7 July 1917, and later transferred to the 3rd Canadian Division from December 1917 to demobilization. Stewart was wounded twice and mentioned in dispatches twice. He was awarded the Distinguished Service Order (DSO) and made a Companion of the Order of St Michael and St George (CMG) for his services during the war.

Stewart returned to Alberta on 19 January 1919 in time for sitting in the legislature. He was awarded the French Croix de Guerre in March.

== Political career ==
Stewart was first elected to the 2nd Alberta Legislature as a member of the Alberta Conservative Party in a by-election held in the Lethbridge City electoral district on 31 October 1911. Stewart defeated his Liberal opponent S. J. Shepherd by 183 votes. The by-election came as a result of the resignation of William Ashbury Buchanan, who was elected in the 1911 Canadian federal election. Stewart was subsequently re-elected in 1913 and acclaimed in 1917 by an act of the legislature which provided members serving overseas in the First World War would be acclaimed. The Lethbridge City electoral district was dissolved prior to the 1921 Alberta general election, which saw Stewart defeat his Labour opponent John Marsh by 978 votes. While Stewart ran as an independent, he was the only former Conservative member to be returned to the legislature in 1921.

Stewart contested the 1925 Canadian federal election in the Lethbridge riding, representing the Conservative Party of Canada. He was defeated by incumbent Progressive candidate Lincoln Henry Jelliff by 743 votes. Stewart did not contest the quickly called 1926 federal election, but he did contest the 1930 election defeating Progressive candidate Thomas Owen King by 987 votes, earning a seat in House of Commons of Canada. Stewart was unable to hold his seat in the 1935 election, being defeated by federal Social Credit candidate John Horne Blackmore by a wide margin of over 3,600 votes. Stewart tried again and fail to unseat Blackmore again in 1940.

As a member of Parliament Stewart took an interest in Waterton Lakes National Park, leading the Canadian negotiations for the establishment of Waterton-Glacier International Peace Park with US Congressman from Montana Scott Leavitt.

== Later life ==
Stewart continued his dental practice for over 58 years until retiring in 1960 at the age of 83. The General Stewart School, an elementary school in Lethbridge, was named for him in 1957, and the same year he was awarded an honorary law degree from the University of Alberta. Stewart returned to Belgium for the 50th anniversary of the Liberation of Mons in 1968, receiving the Citoyen d’Honneur.

Stewart died on 14 August 1970 at the age of 92.

== Bibliography ==
- Davies, Frank (1997). Bloody Red Tabs: General Officer Casualties of the Great War 1914–1918. London: Pen & Sword Books. ISBN 9781783462377.

Legislative Assembly of Alberta
Preceded by William Ashbury Buchanan	MLA Lethbridge City; 1911-1921	Succeeded by District Abolished
Preceded by Donald McNabb	MLA Lethbridge; 1921–1925	Succeeded by Andrew Smeaton
Parliament of Canada
Preceded by Lincoln Henry Jelliff	Member of Parliament Lethbridge; 1930–1935	Succeeded by John Horne Blackmore
