= William Simmons (politician) =

Canadian politician (1865–1956)

William Charles Simmons
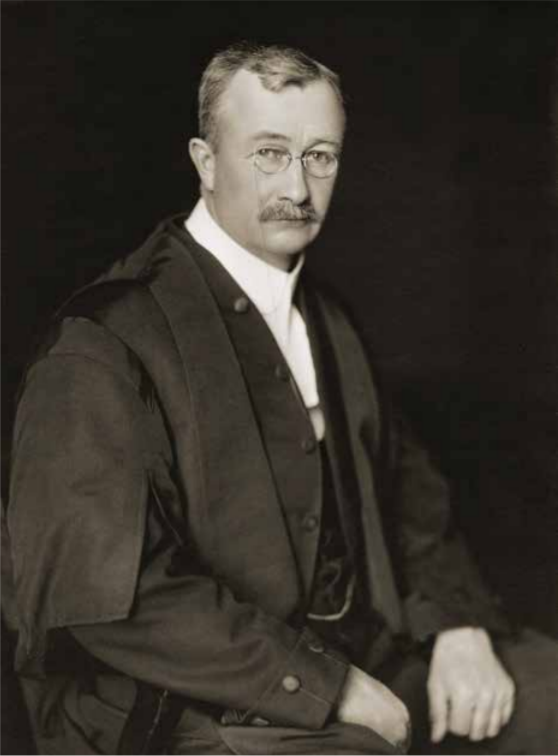

Member of the Legislative Assembly of Alberta for Lethbridge
- In office April 12, 1906 – September 28, 1908
- Preceded by: Leverett DeVeber
- Succeeded by: Donald McNabb

Chief Justice of the Supreme Court of Alberta
- In office August 27, 1924 – September 1, 1936

Supreme Court of Alberta
- In office October 12, 1910 – September 1, 1936

Personal details
- Born: February 28, 1865 Tara, Canada West
- Died: August 26, 1954 (aged 89) Victoria, British Columbia
- Party: Liberal
- Education: University of Toronto
- Occupation: lawyer, politician, judge

William Charles Simmons (February 28, 1865 – August 24, 1956) was a Canadian politician and judge from Alberta.

== Early life ==
William Charles Simmons was born on February 28, 1865, in the farming community of Tara, Canada West, to William Simmons and Jane Wilson. Simmons attended the University of Toronto and completed a Bachelor of Arts in 1895. Simmons married Mary W. Wilson on August 7, 1899, and moved west to Alberta to become a principal in Lethbridge. Simmons resigned from teaching to article with R. B. Bennett in Calgary and passed the bar in the North-West Territories on August 12, 1900. Simmons was employed as a Crown prosecutor in Lethbridge from 1903 to 1904.

== Political life ==
Simmons was a member of the Legislative Assembly of Alberta from 1906 to 1908 for the Alberta Liberal Party. He was elected in a by-election after Leverett DeVeber was appointed to the Senate of Canada. He resigned in 1908 to run for the House of Commons of Canada for Medicine Hat. He was defeated by the former Northwest Territories MLA Charles Alexander Magrath.

== Alberta Supreme Court ==
Simmons was appointed to the Supreme Court of Alberta on October 12, 1910, and was appointed the Chief Justice on August 27, 1924.

Legislative Assembly of Alberta
Preceded by Leverett DeVeber	MLA Lethbridge; 1906–1908	Succeeded by Donald McNabb
