= John Landeryou =

Canadian politician (1905–1982)

John Charles Landeryou (April 2, 1905 – July 26, 1982) was a chef, a seniors rights activist, and a Canadian federal and long-serving provincial-level politician.

== Federal politics ==
Landeryou was born in Harriston, Ontario and was elected to the House of Commons of Canada as a Social Credit candidate in the 1935 Canadian federal election in the riding of Calgary East. He defeated incumbent George Douglas Stanley to win a term in office. Landeryou ran for re-election in the 1940 Canadian federal election but was defeated by Liberal candidate George Henry Ross. Landeryou did not attempt a return to federal politics but continued to work for the Social Credit Party on the provincial level.

== Pensions ==
Landeryou came to Pincher Creek, Alberta and started a movement to provide every senior regardless of means with old age pensions by helping to found the first Old Age pensioners club in 1941. He would help start the Lethbridge Old Age Pensioners Association which met in January 1942 for the first time.

== Provincial politics ==
Landeryou continued to establish himself in Lethbridge through his work promoting the needs of pensioners returning to provincial politics running as an Alberta Social Credit Party candidate in the 1944 Alberta general election. He won the hotly contested election by less than 100 votes in vote transfers to win his first term in the Alberta Legislature.

Landeryou was re-elected to his 2nd term in office in the 1948 Alberta general election this time winning a clear majority in the popular vote. He ran for his 3rd term in office in the 1952 Alberta general election this time defeating Liberal candidate Rex Tennant in a landslide.

Landeryou would continue in office winning re-election in the 1955 Alberta general election. He defeated 3 other candidates in a close race to win his 4th term in office. He would win his 5th term with the largest plurality of his electoral career and win the largest majority in the history of the province to that point, in the 1959 Alberta general election defeating 2 other candidates. He would easily win his 6th term in office in the 1967 Alberta general election with a slightly reduced margin of victory but still remaining popular.

Landeryou ran for his 7th term in office in the 1967 Alberta general election, winning his last term comfortably over a field of 4 candidates. He retired from provincial public office when his district was abolished in 1971 after serving for 27 years.

Parliament of Canada
Preceded by George Douglas Stanley	Member of Parliament Calgary East; 1935–1940	Succeeded by George Henry Ross
Legislative Assembly of Alberta
Preceded by Peter M. Campbell	MLA Lethbridge; 1944–1971	Succeeded by District Abolished
