= Lethbridge (territorial electoral district) =

Former territorial electoral district in the North-West Territories, Canada

Northwest Territories electoral district

Defunct territorial electoral district
- Legislature: Legislative Assembly of the Northwest Territories
- District created: 1891
- District abolished: 1905
- First contested: 1891
- Last contested: 1902

Lethbridge was a territorial electoral district for the Legislative Assembly of the North-West Territories, Canada. The riding was first contested in 1891 and would dissolve upon formation of the Province of Alberta in 1905.

== Members of the Legislative Assembly (MLAs) ==
1. Charles Alexander Magrath 1891–1898
2. Leverett George De Veber 1898–1905

== Election results ==
=== 1902 election ===
1902 North-West Territories general election
Party	Candidate	Votes	%
Liberal–Conservative	Leverett George De Veber	264	53.99
-	John Thomas Moore	225	46.01
Total valid votes		489	100.00

1898 North-West Territories general election
Party	Candidate	Votes	%
Independent	Leverett George De Veber	Acclaimed	-
Total valid votes		-	-

North-West Territories territorial by-election, October 26, 1897 Reason Unknown.
Party	Candidate	Votes	%
Independent	Charles Alexander Magrath	Acclaimed	-
Total valid votes		-	-

1894 North-West Territories general election
Party	Candidate	Votes	%
Independent	Charles Alexander Magrath	Acclaimed	-
Total valid votes		-	-

1891 North-West Territories general election
Party	Candidate	Votes	%
Independent	Charles Alexander Magrath	Acclaimed	-
Total valid votes		-	-

== See also ==
- List of Northwest Territories territorial electoral districts
- Canadian provincial electoral districts
- Lethbridge Alberta provincial electoral district.
