= Lincoln Henry Jelliff =

Canadian politician

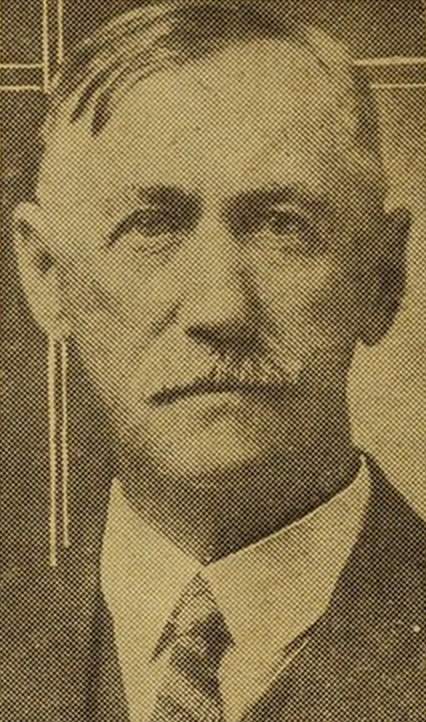

Member of Parliament for Lethbridge
- In office March 1922 – May 1930
- Preceded by: William Ashbury Buchanan
- Succeeded by: John Smith Stewart

Personal details
- Born: 26 April 1865 Oneida, Illinois, United States
- Died: 24 September 1948 (aged 83) Lethbridge, Alberta, Canada
- Party: Progressive, United Farmers of Alberta
- Profession: farmer, insurance advisor, lawyer

Lincoln Henry Jelliff (26 April 1865 – 24 September 1948) served as a Member of Parliament in the Lethbridge riding from 1921 to 1930. He was born in Oneida, Illinois, United States. He was elected as a Progressive in 1921 Canadian federal election and 1925, and was then re-elected in 1926 representing the United Farmers of Alberta. He did not run for re-election in 1930 and retired from parliament.
