= William Carlos Ives =

The Honourable William Carlos Ives
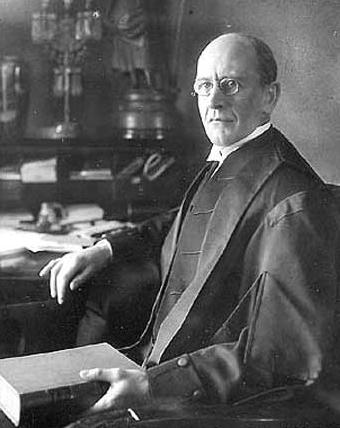
- Ives in the 1930s, while sitting on the provincial supreme court

Supreme Court of Alberta
- In office July 11, 1914 – August 16, 1944

Personal details
- Born: October 30, 1873 Compton, Quebec, Canada
- Died: July 10, 1950 (aged 76) Calgary, Alberta, Canada
- Education: McGill University
- Occupation: judge

William Carlos Ives (October 30, 1873 – July 10, 1950) was a Canadian provincial politician and provincial Supreme Court Justice.

== Early life ==
William Carlos Ives was born in Compton, Quebec on October 30, 1873. His family moved to the Alberta District in the North-West Territories shortly after he was born, to ranch near Pincher Creek in 1881. Ives's father George became one of the original members of the North-West Mounted Police in 1879. When Ives reached his teenage years he left home to work his first job as a cowhand. He left the territories to attend McGill University and graduated in 1899 with a Bachelor of Laws. Ives became a lawyer in Montreal shortly after graduating, being called to the bar in 1900, and worked in the city for two years before moving back to Alberta.

== Political career ==
Ives moved to the town of Lethbridge in 1901 and joined a legal firm partnering with established lawyer Charles Conybeare. He soon became interested in provincial politics and joined the Conservatives.

Ives ran twice as a candidate for the Alberta provincial Conservative party. He ran for the first time in the Lethbridge electoral district in the 1905 Alberta general election. He was defeated by former Northwest Territories MLA Leverett DeVeber in a hotly contested race.

Ives ran for a second time in the Lethbridge City electoral district. He again finished second, this time in a three way race ahead of incumbent Labor MLA Donald McNabb but was defeated by Liberal candidate William Ashbury Buchanan. Ives was unable to expand his popular vote garnering the exact total as his run for office in 1905.

== Judicial career ==
Ives left his practice in Lethbridge moving to Calgary in 1914 after he was appointed to be a judge for the Supreme Court of Alberta. He retired from his judicial career in 1944. Early in his career he became known by the nickname of the "Cowboy Judge".

Ives was known on the bench for his placid demeanor, and his colleagues referred to his poker face. He would rarely interrupt counsel during trial, except the occasional injection of dry humour. Ives's judgements were known to be short and to the point, and rarely reserved cases, and was known, and sometimes criticized for the assistance he would provide young and inexperienced lawyers in the court room.

Ives presided over the scandalous seduction trial of United Farmers Premier John Brownlee. After the jury verdict came down, Ives threw out the jury decision in favour of the plaintiffs and dismissed the case; the Supreme Court of Canada eventually overturned Ives' decision The trial scandalized the United Farmers government and helped lead to its defeat in the 1935 Alberta general election.

Ives also adjudicated the infamous Powlett and Powlett v. The University of Alberta which a University of Alberta student suffered a breakdown after a brutal hazing ritual. The case was brought forward by Calgary lawyer and the victim's father Horatio Powlett and he sought $200,000 in damages. The case was complicated as during the proceeding Ives's own son committed suicide. He found for the Powlett family and awarded them $40,000.

Ives also heard R. v. Solloway and R. v. Mills which the stock broker defendants from Ontario which shorted stocks they were selling to people across Canada. Ives found both defendants guilty on charges of conspiracy, and sentenced them to four months hard labour and fined $275,000.

== Personal life ==
William Ives married Millicent May Troull and had two children, Bill and Elizabeth. His daughter Elizabeth married the son of prominent Calgarian and Senator Patrick Burns.

== Late life ==
After retiring from the judiciary, Ives remained at the Cochrane Ranch, just outside Calgary. He died in Calgary in 1950.
