= Lethbridge City =

Defunct provincial electoral district in Alberta, Canada

Coordinates: 49.697°N 112.838°W

Alberta electoral district

Defunct provincial electoral district
- Legislature: Legislative Assembly of Alberta
- District created: 1909
- District abolished: 1921
- First contested: 1909
- Last contested: 1917

Lethbridge City was a provincial electoral district in Alberta, Canada, mandated to return a single member to the Legislative Assembly of Alberta using the first-past-the-post method of voting from 1909 to 1921.

== History ==
The Lethbridge City electoral district was created after the Lethbridge electoral district was split into the Lethbridge District and Lethbridge City electoral district in 1909.

Lethbridge district was all the rural area surrounding the City of Lethbridge, which in 1913, was split into Little Bow and Taber.

After Lethbridge District was dissolved there was no need to differentiate itself, and thus "City" was dropped in 1921 and Lethbridge was re-formed.

Members of the Legislative Assembly for Lethbridge City
Assembly	Years	Member	Party
See Lethbridge electoral district from 1905-1909
2nd	1909–1911	William Ashbury Buchanan	Liberal
2nd	1911–1913	John Smith Stewart	Conservative
3rd	1913–1917	John Smith Stewart	Conservative
4th	1917–1921	John Smith Stewart	Conservative
See Lethbridge electoral district from 1921-1971

== Election results ==
=== 1909 ===
1909 Alberta general election
Party	Candidate	Votes	%	±%
Liberal	William Ashbury Buchanan	529	44.12%	–
Conservative	William Carlos Ives	456	38.03%	–
Dominion Labor	Donald McNabb	214	17.85%	–
Total		1,199	–	–
Rejected, spoiled and declined		N/A	–	–
Eligible electors / turnout		1,698	70.61%	–
Liberal pickup new district.				
Source(s) Source: "Lethbridge City Official Results 1909 Alberta general election". Alberta Heritage Community Foundation.

=== 1911 by-election ===
Alberta provincial by-election, October 31, 1911 Upon the resignation of William Ashbury Buchanan
Party	Candidate	Votes	%	±%
Conservative	John Smith Stewart	978	55.16%	–
Liberal	S. J. Shepherd	795	44.84%	–
Total valid votes		1,773	–	–
Rejected, spoiled, and declined		–	–	–
Electors / turnout		–	–	–
Conservative gain from Liberal		Swing		N/A
Source(s) "By-elections". Elections Alberta.

=== 1913 ===
1913 Alberta general election
Party	Candidate	Votes	%	±%
Conservative	John Smith Stewart	1,371	51.04%	13.01%
Liberal	J. O. Jones	1,033	38.46%	-5.66%
Socialist	Joseph R. Knight	282	10.50%	–
Total		2,686	–	–
Rejected, spoiled and declined		N/A	–	–
Eligible electors / turnout		4,111	65.34%	-5.28%
Conservative hold		Swing		N/A
Source(s) Source: "Lethbridge City Official Results 1913 Alberta general election". Alberta Heritage Community Foundation.

=== 1917 ===
1917 Alberta general election
Party	Candidate	Votes	%	±%
Conservative	John Smith Stewart	Acclaimed	–	–
Total		N/A	–	–
Rejected, spoiled and declined		N/A	–	–
Eligible electors / turnout		N/A	N/A	–
Conservative hold		Swing		N/A
Source(s) Source: "Lethbridge City Official Results 1917 Alberta general election". Alberta Heritage Community Foundation. One of eleven Members of the Legislative Assembly of Alberta acclaimed under The Elections Act Section 38, which stipulated that any member of the 3rd Alberta Legislative Assembly would be guaranteed re-election, with no contest held, if the member joined for wartime service in the First World War. An Act amending The Election Act respecting Members of the Legislative Assembly on Active Service., SA 1917, c. 38

== By-election reasons ==
- October 31, 1911 — Resignation of Mr. William Buchanan to run for House for Commons.

== Floor crossings ==
- John Stewart became an Independent and ran for re-election as an Independent in Lethbridge date not available

== See also ==
- List of Alberta provincial electoral districts
- Canadian provincial electoral districts
