= Leverett George DeVeber =

Canadian politician

The Honourable Leverett George DeVeber
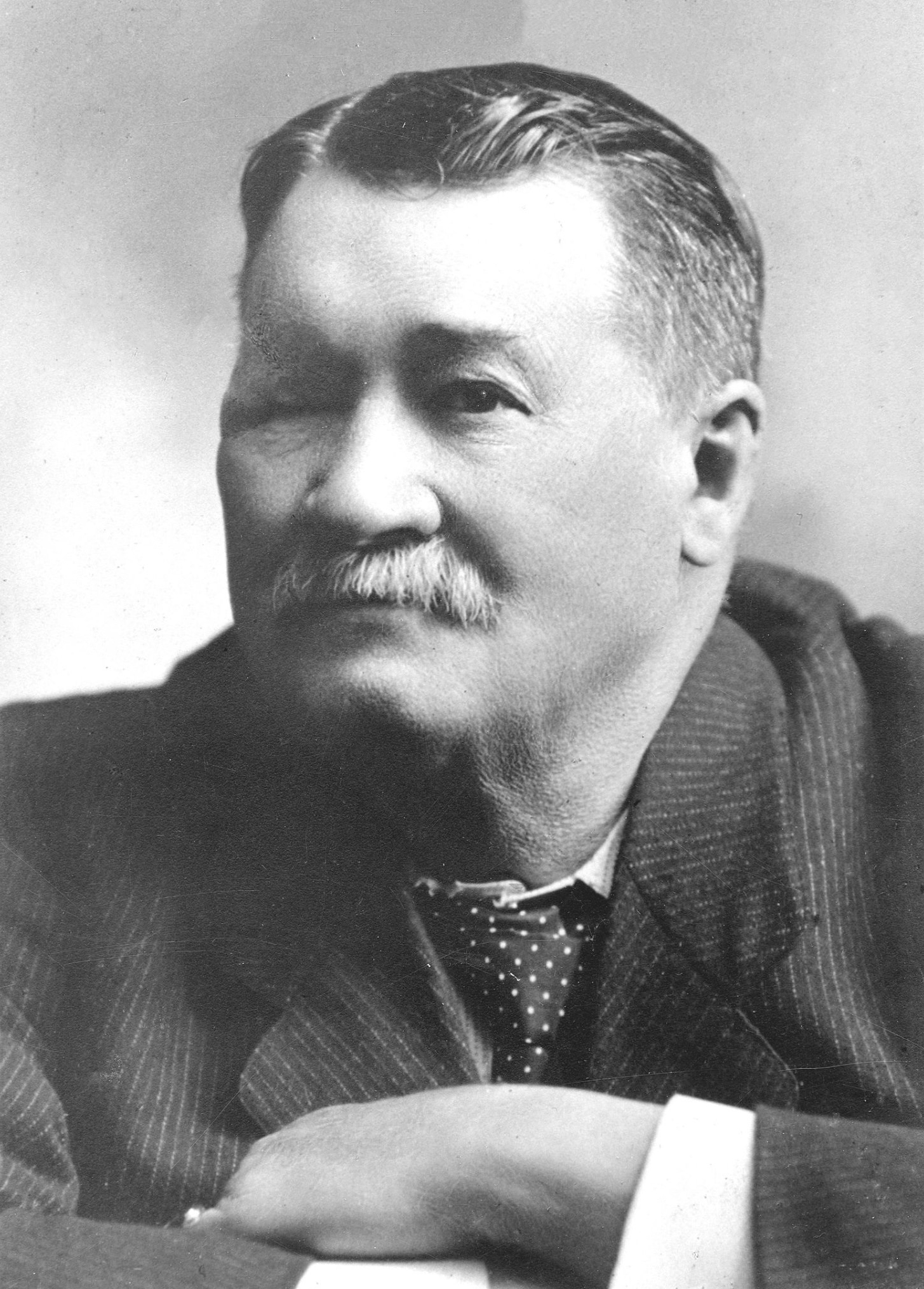

Canadian Senator from Alberta
- In office March 8, 1906 – July 9, 1925
- Prime Minister: Wilfrid Laurier

Member of the Legislative Assembly of Alberta for Lethbridge
- In office November 9, 1905 – March 7, 1906
- Preceded by: New district
- Succeeded by: William Simmons

Minister without portfolio in the Government of Alberta
- In office September 1, 1905 – March 1, 1906

Member of the Legislative Assembly of the Northwest Territories for Lethbridge
- In office November 4, 1898 – January 1, 1905
- Preceded by: Charles Alexander Magrath
- Succeeded by: District abolished

Personal details
- Born: February 10, 1849 Saint John, New Brunswick, Canada
- Died: July 9, 1925 (aged 76) Aylmer, Quebec, Canada
- Party: Alberta Liberal Party; Liberal Party of Canada
- Spouse: Rachael Ann Ryan (m. 1885)
- Children: 2
- Education: University of Pennsylvania

Leverett George DeVeber (sometimes spelled De Veber) (February 10, 1849 – July 9, 1925) was a Canadian politician who served as Member of the Legislative Assemblies of Alberta and the North-West Territories, minister in the government of Alberta, and member of the Senate of Canada. Born in New Brunswick and trained as a physician, he joined the North-West Mounted Police and came west, eventually settling in Lethbridge after leaving the police force. He represented Lethbridge in the North-West Legislative Assembly from 1898 until 1905, when Lethbridge became part of the new province of Alberta. He was appointed Minister without Portfolio in Alberta's first government, but resigned four months later to accept an appointment to the Senate, where he remained until his death.

== Early life ==
DeVeber was born February 10, 1849, in Saint John, New Brunswick. His great-grandfather, Gabriel DeVeber, had been a British army officer who was rewarded for his service in the American Revolution with land in New Brunswick, where his descendants had lived since. Leverett George DeVeber was educated in Saint John and Kingston before attending King's College in Windsor, Nova Scotia. He was a prominent rower in New Brunswick, and also played cricket and baseball and took part in shooting, hunting, and fishing events.

He studied for a year at Harvard College and then completed his medical studies at St. Bartholomew's Hospital in London, from which he graduated in 1870. He then studied at the University of Pennsylvania for a year. He practiced medicine in Saint John for six years, before coming west to join the North-West Mounted Police as a surgeon in 1882. Over the next three years he was stationed at Fort Walsh, Calgary, and Fort Macleod; it was in this last town that he left the NWMP to set up a civilian practice in 1885.

In 1885 DeVeber married Rachael Ann Ryan, who was born in Melbourne where her father was posted with the British Army. The pair had two children: Marion Frances DeVeber, who married shipbuilder Francis Dunn and moved to England, and Leverett Sandys DeVeber, who worked in Toronto for the Bank of Montreal.

DeVeber moved to Lethbridge in 1890, and became its Medical Officer of Health in 1893, in which capacity he continued until at least 1924. In Lethbridge he was involved in music: he took charge of his church's choir in 1891, and the same year sang at a local concert after the intended headliner, Nora Clench, failed to show up. He was also active with the Episcopalian church and the Canadian Order of Foresters.

== Political career ==
=== Territorial and provincial service ===
DeVeber was acclaimed to the Legislative Assembly of the Northwest Territories in the 1898 election, and re-elected in the 1902 election. Though he was a Liberal, he wholeheartedly supported the efforts of Premier Frederick W. A. G. Haultain to conduct territory politics along non-partisan lines. As the federal government prepared to create two new provinces, Alberta and Saskatchewan, out of the Northwest Territories, DeVeber joined with Haultain in advocating the continuation of this non-partisan approach into the governments of the new provinces. This position put him at odds with the Liberal federal government, led by Wilfrid Laurier, who wanted the new provinces' governments to be Liberal. A Liberal, George Bulyea, was therefore appointed Lieutenant Governor of Alberta, and it was understood that he would appoint a Liberal as the province's first premier.

After Alberta's two most prominent Liberals, Peter Talbot and Frank Oliver, made it clear that they were not interested, DeVeber considered himself as a possible candidate. Less than two months before Alberta's formal creation, he wrote to his colleague in the Legislative Assembly of the Northwest Territories, Alexander Cameron Rutherford, that the possibilities "practically came to you and I, both of us weak enough God knows but we have the sense to see it." DeVeber's belief that he may be appointed premier does not appear to have been well-founded: his opposition to the introduction of party lines earned him the enmity of some Liberals, not least because it aligned him with Haultain, a Conservative. In the estimation of historian L. G. Thomas, DeVeber's fellow Liberals "were not inclined to take him too seriously" as a potential premier.

Once it became clear that he was not to become premier, DeVeber turned his ambitions towards the Senate of Canada. Though he had little interest in sustained involvement with the government of Alberta, he accepted Rutherford's (for Rutherford had been named premier) invitation to serve in his first cabinet as Minister without Portfolio. He made clear that he viewed the appointment as an interim one, to give Rutherford time to evaluate the many novice politicians entering the new province's legislature and, in DeVeber's words, "ascertain who of the new blood will rise to the surface". In keeping with the expectations of a government minister in the Westminster system, DeVeber ran in the 1905 provincial election, defeating Conservative William Carlos Ives by a comfortable margin in the Lethbridge electoral district.

=== Senator ===
DeVeber did not serve long either as minister or Member of the Legislative Assembly: having received word that he was to be appointed to the Senate, he resigned from cabinet on March 1, 1906—exactly four months after his appointment—and from the legislature March 7. He formally began his term as Senator the next day. His time as an MLA was so short he did not sign the rolls in the Alberta Legislature and was never sworn in.

While in the Senate, DeVeber chaired the Standing Committee on Public Health and Inspection of Foods. One issue examined by this committee was water pollution: beginning in March 1909 and for nearly a year afterwards, it studied the question in view of the increasing mortality from typhoid fever, and concluded, in the words of the University of Michigan's Jennifer Read, "that the country required some form of legislation to manage the problem. However, it was at a loss about the form it should take and from what body it should emanate." As chair of the committee, DeVeber attended an October 1910 federal-provincial conference in Ottawa called to attempt to coordinate all Canadian jurisdictions' responses to water pollution. Besides recommending that provincial governments use their constitutional authority over health and municipal government to prevent undue water pollution from municipal sewage systems, it advised the federal government to use its authority over navigable waterways to prohibit the dumping of most waste into them; DeVeber supplied a draft bill for Parliament's consideration.

At the same time, DeVeber's colleague Napoléon Belcourt was championing a similar measure in the Senate (as an Ottawa resident, Belcourt was disturbed by the effect on the city's water supply by the dumping of waste upstream, in Aylmer, Quebec), and while doing so he quoted extensively from the report of DeVeber's committee. When Belcourt's bill came up for debate, DeVeber scolded him on the floor of the Senate for misrepresenting the committee's report as being much more supportive of the bill than it actually was; in the estimation of University of Ottawa law professor Jamie Benidickson, DeVeber's comments assured the bill's defeat.

DeVeber remained a Senator until his death in 1925. Alberta's Mount DeVeber, located in Willmore Wilderness Park, is named in his honour.

== Electoral record ==
1905 Alberta general election results (Lethbridge)		Turnout N.A.	
Liberal	Leverett G. DeVeber	639	56.55%
Conservative	William Carlos Ives	491	43.45%
1902 Northwest Territories general election results (Lethbridge)		Turnout N.A.	
	Leverett George DeVeber	264	53.99%
	Henry Bentley	225	46.01%
1898 Northwest Territories general election results (Lethbridge)		Turnout N.A.	
	Leverett George DeVeber	Acclaimed	
