= Charles Alexander Magrath =

Canadian politician

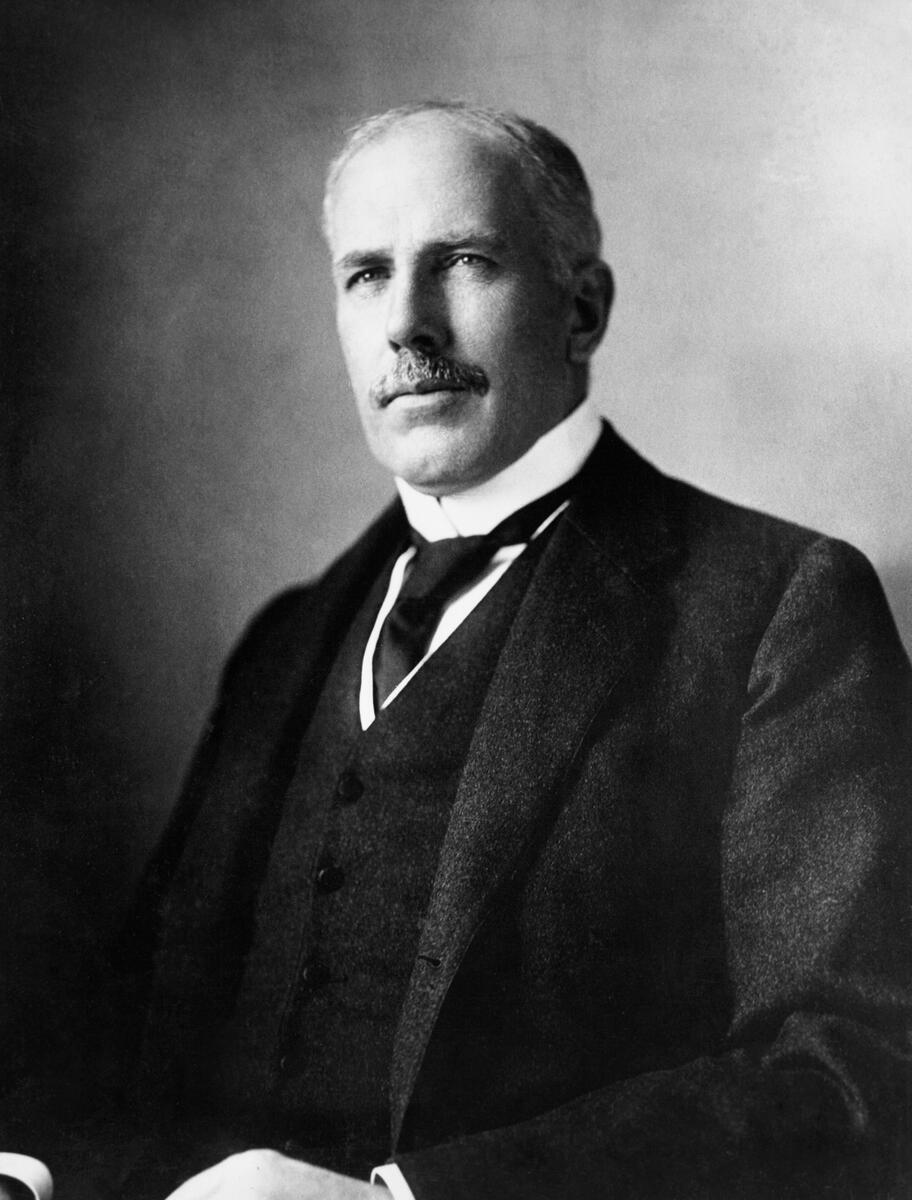

Member of Parliament for Medicine Hat
- In office October 26, 1908 – September 21, 1911
- Preceded by: District created
- Succeeded by: William Ashbury Buchanan

Member of the Legislative Assembly of the North-West Territories for Lethbridge
- In office November 7, 1891 – November 4, 1898
- Preceded by: Riding created
- Succeeded by: Leverett George DeVeber

Personal details
- Born: April 22, 1860 North Augusta, Canada West
- Died: October 30, 1949 (aged 89) Victoria, British Columbia
- Party: Conservative
- Spouse(s): Margaret White Mair (m. 1887–1892) Mabel Galt (m. 1899–1948)
- Children: 4

Charles Alexander Magrath (April 22, 1860 – October 30, 1949) was a Canadian land surveyor and statesman. He conducted foundation surveys of the North-West Territories (NWT) from 1878 until 1885. He joined Sir Alexander Tilloch Galt and Elliott Torrance Galt in their western industrial enterprises as a surveyor, later becoming Elliott's assistant and Land Commissioner of the North Western Coal and Navigation Company. He was also the first mayor of Lethbridge, Alberta District, NWT, which has a major street (Mayor Magrath Drive) named after him.

Magrath was a member of the North-West Legislative Assembly from 1891 to 1898. He was appointed as a cabinet minister in the Frederick Haultain administration in 1897. In the 1891 and 1894 general elections and an 1897 by-election, he represented Lethbridge and was acclaimed.

Magrath was elected to the House of Commons representing the Medicine Hat constituency (1908–1911). He was fuel controller during and after the Great War (1917–20), chairman of Ontario Hydro (1925–31) and was appointed to the Canadian section of the International Joint Commission (as a member 1911–15 and as chairman 1915–36). He also served on the Newfoundland Royal Commission of 1933.

He married Margaret Holmes White Mair in 1887. After giving birth to a son, Charles Bolton, in 1888, she died in June 1892 of complications following the birth of a daughter. In 1899, he married Mabel Lillian Galt, a daughter of Sir Alexander and half-sister of Elliot Galt. Two daughters were born of this union: Amy and Laura.

Magrath has been called "The Father of Irrigation in Southern Alberta". However, during his lifetime he was quick to acknowledge the contributions of Charles Ora Card, the LDS Church, and Elliot Galt to the development of irrigation in the Lethbridge region. The community of Magrath is named in his honour.

== See also ==
- Montague Aldous

Legislative Assembly of the Northwest Territories
Preceded by New District	MLA Lethbridge; 1891–1898	Succeeded by Leverett DeVeber
Parliament of Canada
Preceded by New District	Member of Parliament Medicine Hat; 1908–1911	Succeeded by William Ashbury Buchanan
