= Robert Barrowman =

Canadian politician and artist

Robert Barrowman (December 24, 1881 – February 18, 1947) was a politician and artist in Alberta, Canada. Born outside Glasgow, Scotland, Barrowman showed talent as an artist from an early age drawing sketches of the countryside but was employed in his youth as a shipbuilder for Clyde Shipping Company. Barrowman emigrated to Canada in 1907, and settled first in Toronto where he worked for the Blue Ribbon Tea Company and then in Peterborough, Ontario where he worked for a sign painting company. In 1910, he settled in Lethbridge, Alberta where he founded City Sign Works and Lethbridge Posting Company and became a prominent local businessman. He was elected to city council in 1924, becoming mayor of Lethbridge in 1928 and served in that position until 1934.

In the 1935 provincial election, Barrowman was the Alberta Liberal Party's candidate in Lethbridge placing a distant second behind the Social Credit candidate. He had also been an independent candidate in the 1930 provincial election but was unsuccessful.

Barrowman served as president of the Alberta Liberal Party and, as such, served as interim leader of the party in 1941 following the resignation of party leader Edward Leslie Gray.

An accomplished self-taught painter, he was interested in nature, in particular fossils and geology, influenced Mike Pisko and painted with A.Y. Jackson.
