= Donald McNabb =

Canadian politician

Member of the Alberta Legislative Assembly for Lethbridge
- In office January 8, 1909 – March 21, 1909
- Preceded by: William Simmons
- Succeeded by: John Smith Stewart

Personal details
- Born: February 1870
- Died: June 18, 1934 (aged 64)
- Party: Labour

Donald McNabb (February 1870 – June 18, 1934) was a politician from Alberta, Canada. He served in the Legislative Assembly of Alberta in 1909 as the first Labour Party MLA in that province's history.

In 1890 he helped form a committee to raise money to buy books, periodicals and furnishings for the Miner's Library in Lethbridge.

McNabb was the first member of a third party (a party other than Conservatives and Liberals) to be elected to the Legislative Assembly of Alberta. He was elected as a Labor member. He was elected by acclamation in January 1909 by-election for Lethbridge.

During his time in the Legislative Assembly he accomplished another first in Alberta. Bill 8 An Act to amend the Lethbridge Charter was the first bill introduced by an opposition MLA and a member of a third party to receive Royal Assent in the legislature. He also introduced a second bill in the same legislative sitting to get assent, Bill 10 An Act respecting the Galt Hospital.

In the 1909 general election, McNabb ran as a Labour candidate in the new Lethbridge City riding, but was not re-elected.

In 1912, he chaired the meeting that formed the Alberta Federation of Labour.

Preceded by William Simmons	MLA Lethbridge; 1908–1909	Succeeded by John Smith Stewart
