= Vegreville (disambiguation) =

Vegreville could refer to:

- Vegreville, town in Alberta, Canada
- Vegreville Airport, airport
- Vegreville—Wainwright
- Vegreville (federal electoral district)
- Fort Saskatchewan-Vegreville, electoral district
- HMCS Vegreville, ship
- Vegreville-Bruce
- Vegreville Rangers
- Vegreville-Viking
- Vegreville (provincial electoral district)
