= Derek Fox =

Derek Fox may refer to:

- Derek Fox (Canadian politician) (born 1950), insurance agent and former provincial level politician from Alberta, Canada
- Derek Fox (broadcaster) (born 1947), New Zealand broadcaster, Māori Party candidate and mayor of Wairoa
- Derek Fox (jockey) (born 1992), Irish jockey
- Derek Fox (comics), fictional character from DC Comics

== See also ==
- Deryck Fox (born 1964), English rugby league footballer
