= Earl Hardy =

Canadian politician (1913-2000)

Earl M. Hardy

Member of the Legislative Assembly of Alberta
- In office August 17, 1948 – June 17, 1963
- Preceded by: James McPherson
- Succeeded by: District abolished
- Constituency: Bruce

Personal details
- Born: September 6, 1913
- Died: January 15, 2000 (aged 86)
- Party: Social Credit
- Spouse: Mary
- Occupation: school teacher, politician

Earl M. Hardy (September 6, 1913 – January 15, 2000) was a provincial politician from Alberta, Canada. He served as a member of the Legislative Assembly of Alberta from 1948 to 1963 sitting with the Social Credit caucus in government.

== Political career ==
Hardy ran for a seat to the Alberta Legislature in the electoral district of Bruce as a Social Credit candidate in the 1948 Alberta general election. He defeated two other candidates by a wide margin to hold the seat for his party.

Hardy ran for a second term in the 1952 Alberta general election. He held his seat easily defeating two other candidates with most of his 1948 popular vote to return to office.

The 1955 Alberta general election saw a closely contested race. Hardy ran for re-election in a four way race. His toughest opponent was Liberal candidate Claire Liden who polled a strong second on the first count. The election went to a third count with Hardy edging out Liden by 72 votes on the final preferences to return to his third term in office.

Hardy ran for a fourth term in the 1959 Alberta general election. He faced Liden for the second time as well as two other candidates. Hardy won a landslide majority while Liden's vote collapsed causing him to finish third.

Hardy retired from provincial politics at dissolution of the assembly in 1963. He died on January 15, 2000.
