= Vegreville (provincial electoral district) =

Defunct provincial electoral district in Alberta, Canada

Coordinates: 53.50°N 112.05°W

Alberta electoral district

Defunct provincial electoral district
- Legislature: Legislative Assembly of Alberta
- District created: 1909
- District abolished: 1963
- District re-created: 1971
- District re-abolished: 1993
- First contested: 1909
- Last contested: 1989

Vegreville was a provincial electoral district in Alberta, Canada, mandated to return a single member to the Legislative Assembly of Alberta from 1909 to 1963 and again from 1971 to 1993.

== History ==
Members of the Legislative Assembly for Vegreville
Assembly	Years	Member	Party
See Vermilion 1905-1909
2nd	1909 - 1913	James Holden	Liberal
3rd	1913 - 1917	Joseph McCallum	Liberal
4th	1917 - 1921	Joseph McCallum	Liberal
5th	1921 - 1926	Archie Matheson	United Farmers
6th	1926 - 1930	Archie Matheson	United Farmers
7th	1930 - 1935	Archie Matheson	United Farmers
8th	1935 - 1940	James McPherson	Social Credit
9th	1940 - 1944	George Woytkiw	Social Credit
10th	1944 - 1948	Michael Ponich	Social Credit
11th	1948 - 1952	Michael Ponich	Social Credit
12th	1952 - 1955	Michael Ponich	Social Credit
13th	1955 - 1959	Stanley Ruzycki	CCF
14th	1959 - 1963	Alex Gordey	Social Credit
See Vegreville-Bruce 1963-1971
17th	1971 - 1975	John Batiuk	Progressive; Conservative
18th	1975 - 1979	John Batiuk	Progressive; Conservative
19th	1979 - 1982	John Batiuk	Progressive; Conservative
20th	1982 - 1986	John Batiuk	Progressive; Conservative
21st	1986 - 1989	Derek Fox	New Democrat
22nd	1989 - 1993	Derek Fox	New Democrat
See Vegreville-Viking 1993-2004

=== Boundary history ===
Vegreville was created from the northwest corner of the Vermilion district as part of the almost-doubling of seats in the Legislature in 1909. Over time, its boundaries were adjusted several times, shrinking to the area immediately surrounding the town of Vegreville.

In 1963, Vegreville was merged with some of the Bruce district to form Vegreville-Bruce, but in the redistribution that followed, the district was renamed Vegreville with little change in boundaries. The riding was finally abolished in 1993, mostly absorbed by Vegreville-Viking, with a small area transferred to Vermilion-Lloydminster.

=== Representation history ===
Vegreville (and Vegreville-Bruce) was mostly a bellwether riding, having been held by an opposition party only once until 1982. Its first MLA was James Bismark Holden, who had already served as MLA for Vermilion for the Liberals. He served one term in Vegreville and retired in 1913.

His successor was Joseph McCallum, who won Vegreville for the Liberals by a much smaller margin in 1913 and 1917 but nonetheless held the district for the government. However, in 1921, he was soundly defeated by United Farmers of Alberta candidate Archie Matheson in their party's rise to power. Matheson was a vocal backbencher in the UFA government, opposing his own government's stances on prohibition and eugenics, and aggressively advocating for local interests during his three terms.

However, Matheson was in turn soundly defeated by Social Credit candidate James McPherson when the UFA was swept out of power in 1935, placing third in the first round of voting. McPherson served only one term.

In 1940, Social Credit held the seat with candidate George Woytkiw winning on the second round. Matheson ran in this election as well in an attempt to re-take the seat, this time as a CCF candidate, but placed third again.

Woytkiw also served only one term, but Social Credit candidate Michael Ponich held the seat again in 1944, despite a strong challenge by the CCF. Ponich won again in a landslide in 1948, but faced another close race in 1952.

In 1955 Stanley Ruzycki defeated Ponich in the second round of voting to take the seat for the Co-Operative Commonwealth Federation. In response, the Social Credit government abolished instant-runoff voting in rural ridings and introduced first past the post voting across the province. Ruzycki was subsequently defeated by Social Credit candidate Alex Gordey in 1959.

After Gordey's first term, Vegreville was merged with Bruce, and he chose to run again in the new riding of Vegreville-Bruce. He served two terms there, and Vegreville was reinstated in 1971.

Running again in Vegreville, Gordey would be defeated along with Harry Strom's government by the Progressive Conservatives. John Batiuk won the seat by a significant margin, and went on to serve four terms, becoming the longest-serving MLA in the district's history.

When Batiuk chose not to run again in 1986, the open seat was picked up by New Democrat Derek Fox. He served two terms until the riding was abolished in 1993, and was defeated by future premier Ed Stelmach in the new riding of Vegreville-Viking. As of 2016, Fox is the last Alberta New Democrat to have held a rural seat for two successive terms.

== Election results ==
=== 1900s ===
1909 Alberta general election
Party	Candidate	Votes	%
Liberal	James Holden	1,249	72.66%
Conservative	Frank W. W. Fane	470	27.34%
Total valid votes		1,719	
Rejected, spoiled and declined		-	
Registered electors & turnout		2,353	73.06%
Liberal pickup new district.			

=== 1910s ===
1913 Alberta general election
Party	Candidate	Votes	%	±%
Liberal	Joseph S. McCallum	812	45.72%	-26.94%
Independent	Peter Savarich	544	30.63%	
Conservative	Frederick A. Morrison	420	23.64%	-3.70%
Total valid votes		1,776		
Rejected, spoiled and declined		-		
Registered electors & turnout		2,179	81.51%	+8.45%
Liberal hold		Swing		-28.79%

1917 Alberta general election
Party	Candidate	Votes	%	±%
Liberal	Joseph S. McCallum	1,864	59.12%	+13.40%
Conservative	Malcolm R. Gordon	1,289	40.88%	+17.24%
Total valid votes		3,153		
Rejected, spoiled and declined		-		
Registered electors & turnout		3,859	81.71%	+0.20%
Liberal hold		Swing		-1.92%

=== 1920s ===
1921 Alberta general election
Party	Candidate	Votes	%	±%
United Farmers	Archie Matheson	3,047	69.69%	
Liberal	Joseph S. McCallum	1,325	30.31%	-28.81%
Total valid votes		4,372		
Rejected, spoiled and declined		-		
Registered electors & turnout		4,461	98.00%	+16.29%
United Farmers gain from Liberal		Swing		+49.25%

For the 1926 election, the United Farmers government introduced alternative vote in rural constituencies. Three counts were necessary in Vegreville, as Matheson failed to win a majority on the first or second round.

1926 Alberta general election
Party	Candidate	Votes	%	±%
United Farmers	Archie Matheson	1,986	45.09%	-24.60%
Liberal	J.D. Hannan	1,395	31.67%	+1.36%
Conservative	A.W. Fraser	687	15.60%	
Independent Farmer	P. Bahry	337	7.65%	
Second count
United Farmers	Archie Matheson	2,217	56.57%	+10.48%
Liberal	J.D. Hannan	1,702	43.43%	+11.76%
Neither		486		
Total valid votes		4,405		
Rejected, spoiled and declined		342		
Registered electors & turnout		6,674	71.13%	-26.87%
United Farmers hold		Swing		-12.98%

Final round swing represents gain from the first round. Overall swing is calculated from first preferences.

=== 1930s ===
1930 Alberta general election
Party	Candidate	Votes	%	±%
United Farmers	Archie Matheson	2,364	57.36%	+12.27%
Liberal	Harry White	1,757	42.64%	+10.97%
Total valid votes		4,121		
Rejected, spoiled and declined		197		
Registered electors & turnout		5,919	72.95%	+1.82%
United Farmers hold		Swing		+0.65%

1935 Alberta general election
Party	Candidate	Votes	%	±%
Social Credit	James McPherson	2,817	50.29%	
Liberal	Charles Gordon	1,681	30.01%	-12.63%
United Farmers	Archie Matheson	995	17.76%	-39.60%
Conservative	M.H. Penish	109	1.95%	
Total valid votes		5,602		
Rejected, spoiled and declined		148		
Registered electors & turnout		6,973	82.46%	+9.51%
Social Credit gain from United Farmers		Swing		+31.46%

The source records a second count between McPherson and Gordon despite McPherson's majority result. This may be the result of an archiving error.

=== 1940s ===
1940 Alberta general election
Party	Candidate	Votes	%	±%
Social Credit	George Woytkiw	2,223	47.64%	-2.65%
Independent	J. Yakimaschak	1,920	41.15%	+11.14%
Co-operative Commonwealth	Archie Matheson	523	11.21%	
Second count
Social Credit	George Woytkiw	2,375	53.54%	+5.90%
Independent	J. Yakimaschak	2,061	46.46%	+5.31%
Neither		230		
Total valid votes		4,666		
Rejected, spoiled and declined		166		
Registered electors & turnout		6,389	75.63%	-6.83%
Social Credit hold		Swing		-6.90%

1940 Alberta general election
Party	Candidate	Votes	%	±%
Social Credit	Michael Ponich	1,874	48.89%	+1.25%
Co-operative Commonwealth	William Porayko	1,306	34.07%	+22.86%
Labour Progressive	Peter Tymchuk	653	17.04%	
Second count
Social Credit	Michael Ponich	1,923	56.29%	+7.40%
Co-operative Commonwealth	William Porayko	1,493	43.71%	+9.64%
Neither		417		
Total valid votes		3,833		
Rejected, spoiled and declined		98		
Registered electors & turnout		6,072	64.74%	-10.89%
Social Credit hold		Swing		-10.81%

1948 Alberta general election
Party	Candidate	Votes	%	±%
Social Credit	Michael Ponich	2,101	50.75%	+1.86%
Co-operative Commonwealth	Jack Melenka	1,276	30.82%	-3.25%
Liberal	Michael Dowhaniuk	763	18.43%	
Total valid votes		4,140		
Rejected, spoiled and declined		303		
Registered electors & turnout		6,334	70.15%	+5.41%
Social Credit hold		Swing		+22.56%

=== 1950s ===
1952 Alberta general election
Party	Candidate	Votes	%	±%
Social Credit	Michael Ponich	1,981	43.09%	-7.66%
Co-operative Commonwealth	Stanley Ruzycki	1,434	31.19%	+0.37%
Liberal	John Koshuta	1,182	25.71%	+7.28%
Second count
Social Credit	Michael Ponich	2,239	56.70%	+13.61%
Co-operative Commonwealth	Stanley Ruzycki	1,710	43.30%	+12.11%
Neither		648		
Total valid votes		4,597		
Rejected, spoiled and declined		262		
Registered electors & turnout		6,441	75.44%	+5.29%
Social Credit hold		Swing		-4.02%

1955 Alberta general election
Party	Candidate	Votes	%	±%
Co-operative Commonwealth	Stanley Ruzycki	1,953	39.33%	+8.14%
Social Credit	Michael Ponich	1,887	38.00%	-5.09%
Liberal	E.F. Morton	1,126	22.67%	-3.04%
Second count
Co-operative Commonwealth	Stanley Ruzycki	2,374	51.94%	+12.61%
Social Credit	Michael Ponich	2,197	48.06%	+10.06%
Neither		395		
Total valid votes		4,966		
Rejected, spoiled and declined		276		
Registered electors & turnout		6,469	81.03%	+5.59%
Co-operative Commonwealth gain from Social Credit		Swing		+6.62%

After the 1955 election, the Social Credit government abolished alternative vote in rural districts and reintroduced first past the post. Vegreville was therefore won without a majority on the first round in 1959, and this change can also be seen in the dramatic drop in spoiled (incorrectly marked) ballots.

1959 Alberta general election
Party	Candidate	Votes	%	±%
Social Credit	Alex Gordey	2,248	47.75%	+9.75%
Co-operative Commonwealth	Stanley Ruzycki	1,253	26.61%	-12.72%
Liberal	John Koshuta	676	14.36%	-8.31%
Progressive Conservative	Joseph Melnychuk	531	11.28%	
Total valid votes		4,708		
Rejected, spoiled and declined		12		
Registered electors & turnout		6,109	77.26%	-3.77%
Social Credit gain from Co-operative Commonwealth		Swing		+11.24%

=== 1971 ===
1971 Alberta general election
Party	Candidate	Votes	%	±%
Progressive Conservative	John S. Batiuk	3,042	44.93%	–
Social Credit	Alex W. Gordey	2,191	32.36%	–
New Democratic	Barney Welsh	1,537	22.70%	–
Total		6,770	–	–
Rejected, spoiled and declined		67	–	–
Eligible electors / turnout		9,210	74.23%	–
Progressive Conservative pickup new district.				
Source(s) Source: "Vegreville Official Results 1971 Alberta general election". Alberta Heritage Community Foundation.

=== 1975 ===
1975 Alberta general election
Party	Candidate	Votes	%	±%
Progressive Conservative	John S. Batiuk	3,644	53.42%	8.48%
New Democratic	Barney Welsh	2,270	33.27%	10.57%
Social Credit	Ernie Youzwishen	908	13.31%	-19.05%
Total		6,822	–	–
Rejected, spoiled and declined		20	–	–
Eligible electors / turnout		8,813	77.64%	3.40%
Progressive Conservative hold		Swing		3.79%
Source(s) Source: "Vegreville Official Results 1975 Alberta general election". Alberta Heritage Community Foundation.

=== 1979 ===
1979 Alberta general election
Party	Candidate	Votes	%	±%
Progressive Conservative	John S. Batiuk	3,835	49.14%	-4.27%
New Democratic	Harry Babchuk	2,490	31.91%	-1.37%
Social Credit	Robert E. Robert	1,210	15.50%	2.19%
Liberal	Alan Arthur Vinet	269	3.45%	–
Total		7,804	–	–
Rejected, spoiled and declined		N/A	–	–
Eligible electors / turnout		9,855	79.19%	1.55%
Progressive Conservative hold		Swing		-1.45%
Source(s) Source: "Vegreville Official Results 1979 Alberta general election". Alberta Heritage Community Foundation.

=== 1982 ===
1982 Alberta general election
Party	Candidate	Votes	%	±%
Progressive Conservative	John S. Batiuk	4,526	53.63%	4.48%
New Democratic	Bob Sarafinchan	2,418	28.65%	-3.26%
Western Canada Concept	Loren Yasinski	807	9.56%	–
Social Credit	Robert E. Robert	487	5.77%	-9.73%
Independent	Barry M. Bernard	202	2.39%	–
Total		8,440	–	–
Rejected, spoiled and declined		18	–	–
Eligible electors / turnout		10,823	78.15%	-1.04%
Progressive Conservative hold		Swing		3.87%
Source(s) Source: "Vegreville Official Results 1982 Alberta general election". Alberta Heritage Community Foundation.

=== 1986 ===
1986 Alberta general election
Party	Candidate	Votes	%	±%
New Democratic	Derek Fox	3,903	45.62%	16.97%
Progressive Conservative	Ron Rudkowsky	3,328	38.90%	-14.72%
Representative	Allen Antoniuk	1,150	13.44%	–
Liberal	John A. Sawiak	174	2.03%	–
Total		8,555	–	–
Rejected, spoiled and declined		17	–	–
Eligible electors / turnout		12,598	68.04%	-10.11%
New Democratic gain from Progressive Conservative		Swing		-9.13%
Source(s) Source: "Vegreville Official Results 1986 Alberta general election". Alberta Heritage Community Foundation.

=== 1989 ===
1989 Alberta general election
Party	Candidate	Votes	%	±%
New Democratic	Derek Fox	4,865	53.35%	7.73%
Progressive Conservative	Gordon Miller	3,806	41.74%	2.84%
Liberal	Frederick G. Paasche	448	4.91%	2.88%
Total		9,119	–	–
Rejected, spoiled and declined		27	–	–
Eligible electors / turnout		12,167	75.17%	7.13%
New Democratic hold		Swing		2.45%
Source(s) Source: "Vegreville Official Results 1989 Alberta general election". Alberta Heritage Community Foundation.

== Plebiscite results ==
=== 1957 liquor plebiscite ===
1957 Alberta liquor plebiscite results: Vegreville
Question A: Do you approve additional types of outlets for the sale of beer, wine and spirituous liquor subject to a local vote?
Ballot choice	Votes	%
Yes	1,187	56.04%
No	931	43.96%
Total votes	2,118	100%
Rejected, spoiled and declined	32	
5,795 eligible electors, turnout 37.10%

On October 30, 1957, a stand-alone plebiscite was held province wide in all 50 of the then current provincial electoral districts in Alberta. The government decided to consult Alberta voters to decide on liquor sales and mixed drinking after a divisive debate in the Legislature. The plebiscite was intended to deal with the growing demand for reforming antiquated liquor control laws.

The plebiscite was conducted in two parts. Question A asked in all districts, asked the voters if the sale of liquor should be expanded in Alberta, while Question B asked in a handful of districts within the corporate limits of Calgary and Edmonton asked if men and woman were allowed to drink together in establishments.

Province wide Question A of the plebiscite passed in 33 of the 50 districts while Question B passed in all five districts. Vegreville voted in favour of the proposal by a solid majority. Voter turnout in the district was abysmal falling well under the province wide average of 46%.

Official district returns were released to the public on December 31, 1957. The Social Credit government in power at the time did not considered the results binding. However the results of the vote led the government to repeal all existing liquor legislation and introduce an entirely new Liquor Act.

Municipal districts lying inside electoral districts that voted against the Plebiscite were designated Local Option Zones by the Alberta Liquor Control Board and considered effective dry zones, business owners that wanted a licence had to petition for a binding municipal plebiscite in order to be granted a licence.

== See also ==
- List of Alberta provincial electoral districts
- Canadian provincial electoral districts
