= 1957 Alberta liquor plebiscite =

Canadian poll on relaxing liquor laws

The 1957 Alberta liquor plebiscite was a province-wide plebiscite conducted in Alberta, Canada The plebiscite asked voters if they were in favour of adding extra ALCB outlets in their district. It was held on October 30, 1957. At the time, the Alberta Liquor Control Board operated only a few stores from which liquor could be legally purchased.

A vote among egg producers was also held on the question of an egg marketing board.

An additional vote was held regarding mixed drinking in the major cities, also on October 30, 1957.

The 1957 votes were not held in conjunction with an Alberta election.

== Background ==
The province of Alberta decided to hold a plebiscite after divisive debate in the legislature on the need to deal with demands to loosen regulatory restrictions to liquor that had been in place since the Prohibition era.

The vote to hold a plebiscite had carried on a recorded division by a single vote after much debate.

== Egg marketing board ==
In addition to the liquor controversy growing in the province, there was another testing of citizens' sentiment on an issue. The government decided to hold a plebiscite among egg producers on whether or not to establish a compulsory egg marketing board. That plebiscite was originally to be held in June 1957, but Leonard Halmrast, the Minister of Agriculture, decided to hold it in conjunction with the liquor plebiscite so that the sentiment of egg producers could be tested at the same time as voters for the liquor plebiscite, to save costs. That decision later led to controversy when numerous producers were missed after the plan was defeated in a close vote. A second vote among egg producers in summer 1958 brought in a 'Yes" result.

== Question B. Mixed Drinking ==
In Calgary, and Edmonton, as well as the parts of Gleichen, Banff-Cochrane and Clover Bar that were within the Calgary and Edmonton city limits, a second question was put on the ballot asking if "mixed drinking" should be permitted in beer parlours. Men and women had not been allowed to drink together in Albertan bars since 1928, four years after Prohibition had been repealed.

== Results and impact ==
The province-wide question on new liquor store locations saw mixed results across the province: the more conservative rural areas voted overwhelmingly against, and urban areas voted overwhelmingly for. After the votes were counted, the "for" side won the plebiscite by a wide margin. The opening of additional ALCB outlets was still limited by "local option" votes in the affected districts.

The second question regarding mixed drinking in the major cities passed with an almost 4 to 1 margin. The Alberta government abolished gender-based segregation of bars in the rest of the province (without an additional plebiscite) in 1967.

This province-wide plebiscite cost the province $355,309.62 to run.

== Plebiscite results ==
October 30, 1957 Alberta liquor plebiscite results
Question A: Do you approve additional types of outlets for the sale of beer, wine and spirituous liquor subject to a local vote?
| Totals | | For | % | Against | % | Total votes | For/against | Rejected | Eligible | Turnout |
|---|---|---|---|---|---|---|---|---|---|---|
| Totals | | 171,786 | 63.92% | 96,963 | 36.08% | 268,749 | For 33/17 | 2,528 | 580,893 | 46.70% |
Question B1: Should mixed drinking be allowed in beer parlours in Calgary and the surrounding areas? Question B2: Should mixed drinking be allowed in beer parlours in Edmonton and the surrounding areas?
| Totals | | For | % | Against | % | Total votes | For/against | Rejected | Eligible | Turnout |
| B1 Total | | 49,789 | 81.13% | 11,578 | 18.87% | 61,367 | For 3/0 | 379 | 115,247 | 53.58% |
| B2 Total | | 49,721 | 76.09% | 15,625 | 23.91% | 65,346 | For 2/0 | 657 | 129,599 | 50.93% |
| B Combined | | 99,510 | 78.53% | 27,203 | 21.47% | 126,713 | For 5/0 | 1,036 | 244,846 | 52.18% |
Results breakdown by district
| District name; question being voted on | | For | % | Against | % | Total votes | For/against | Rejected | Eligible | Turnout |
| Acadia-Coronation | A | 1,526 | 53.92% | 1,304 | 46.08% | 2,830 | For | 48 | 5,404 | 53.26% |
| Alexandra | A | 908 | 46.60% | 1,083 | 54.40% | 1,991 | Against | 20 | 5,963 | 33.73% |
| Athabasca | A | 1,161 | 64.11% | 650 | 35.89% | 1,811 | For | 62 | 5,774 | 32.44% |
| Banff-Cochrane | A | 2,324 | 78.33% | 643 | 21.67% | 2,967 | For | 37 | 6,237 | 48.16% |
| Banff-Cochrane | B1 | 115 | 87.12% | 17 | 12.88% | 132 | For | 0 | 242 | 54.55% |
| Bonnyville | A | 1,716 | 66.05% | 882 | 33.95% | 2,598 | For | 31 | 6,988 | 37.62% |
| Bow Valley-Empress | A | 1,818 | 54.86% | 1,496 | 45.14% | 3,314 | For | 11 | 6,341 | 52.44% |
| Bruce | A | 980 | 36.69% | 1,691 | 63.31% | 2,671 | Against | 21 | 6,108 | 44.07% |
| Calgary | A | 47,382 | 77.41% | 13,830 | 22.59% | 61,212 | For | 391 | 114,986 | 53.57% |
| Calgary | B1 | 49,669 | 81.12% | 11,561 | 18.88% | 61,230 | For | 379 | 114,986 | 53.58% |
| Camrose | A | 1,378 | 32.84% | 2,818 | 67.16% | 4,196 | Against | 12 | 7,721 | 54.50% |
| Cardston | A | 473 | 20.94% | 1,786 | 79.06% | 2,259 | Against | 13 | 4,296 | 52.89% |
| Clover Bar | A | 3,035 | 67.87% | 1,437 | 32.13% | 4,472 | For | 75 | 9,655 | 47.10% |
| Clover Bar | B2 | 1,076 | 88.78% | 136 | 11.22% | 1,212 | For | 35 | 2,320 | 53.75% |
| Cypress | A | 1,090 | 44.87% | 1,339 | 55.13% | 2,429 | Against | 18 | 5,361 | 46.64% |
| Didsbury | A | 1,356 | 40.88% | 1,961 | 59.12% | 3,317 | Against | 34 | 6,535 | 51.28% |
| Drumheller | A | 1,597 | 62.70% | 950 | 37.30% | 2,547 | For | 14 | 5,377 | 47.63% |
| Edmonton | A | 46,219 | 71.98% | 17,994 | 28.02% | 64,213 | For | 620 | 127,279 | 50.94% |
| Edmonton | B2 | 48,645 | 75.85% | 15,485 | 24.15% | 64,134 | For | 622 | 127,279 | 50.88% |
| Edson | A | 2,222 | 82.08% | 485 | 17.92% | 2,707 | For | 17 | 7,823 | 34.82% |
| Gleichen | A | 1,440 | 61.02% | 920 | 38.98% | 2,360 | For | 13 | 4,885 | 48.58% |
| Gleichen | B1 | 5 | 100.00% | 0 | 0.00% | 5 | For | 0 | 19 | 26.32% |
| Grande Prairie | A | 1,462 | 58.57% | 1,034 | 41.43% | 2,496 | For | 9 | 8,907 | 28.12% |
| Grouard | A | 1,388 | 69.99% | 595 | 30.01% | 1,983 | For | 48 | 8,426 | 24.10% |
| Hand Hills | A | 1,669 | 57.87% | 1,215 | 42.13% | 2,884 | For | 19 | 5,504 | 52.74% |
| Lac La Biche | A | 1,059 | 66.15% | 542 | 33.85% | 1,601 | For | 9 | 4,678 | 34.42% |
| Lac Ste. Anne | A | 1,507 | 70.16% | 641 | 29.84% | 2,148 | For | 54 | 6,482 | 33.97% |
| Lacombe | A | 1,205 | 37.47% | 2,011 | 62.53% | 3,216 | Against | 52 | 6,302 | 51.86% |
| Leduc | A | 1,701 | 62.95% | 1,001 | 37.05% | 2,702 | For | 10 | 6,996 | 38.77% |
| Lethbridge | A | 4,012 | 49.34% | 4,119 | 50.66% | 8,131 | Against | 66 | 15,974 | 51.32% |
| Little Bow | A | 1,584 | 51.50% | 1,492 | 48.50% | 3,076 | For | 1 | 5,715 | 53.84% |
| Macleod | A | 1,892 | 49.78% | 1,909 | 50.22% | 3,801 | Against | 46 | 7,476 | 51.46% |
| Medicine Hat | A | 2,728 | 50.04% | 2,724 | 49.96% | 5,452 | For | 98 | 12,586 | 44.10% |
| Okotoks-High River | A | 2,088 | 62.18% | 1,270 | 37.82% | 3,358 | For | 33 | 6,602 | 51.36% |
| Olds | A | 1,164 | 38.24% | 1,880 | 61.76% | 3,044 | Against | 32 | 7,332 | 41.95% |
| Peace River | A | 1,871 | 68.09% | 877 | 31.91% | 2,748 | For | 14 | 10,020 | 27.57% |
| Pembina | A | 1,375 | 52.12% | 1,263 | 47.88% | 2,638 | For | 75 | 7,240 | 37.47% |
| Pincher Creek-Crowsnest | A | 1,656 | 65.87% | 858 | 34.13% | 2,514 | For | 9 | 6,009 | 41.99% |
| Ponoka | A | 1,280 | 46.04% | 1,500 | 53.96% | 2,780 | Against | 53 | 6,317 | 44.88% |
| Red Deer | A | 3,565 | 56.88% | 2,703 | 43.12% | 6,268 | For | 80 | 14,151 | 44.86% |
| Redwater | A | 1,589 | 76.28% | 494 | 23.72% | 2,083 | For | 17 | 5,838 | 35.97% |
| Rocky Mountain House | A | 1,286 | 52.58% | 1,160 | 47.42% | 2,446 | For | 7 | 5,950 | 41.23% |
| Sedgewick | A | 1,362 | 44.39% | 1,706 | 55.61% | 3,068 | Against | 9 | 5,921 | 51.97% |
| Spirit River | A | 762 | 53.81% | 654 | 46.19% | 1,416 | For | 29 | 6,160 | 23.46% |
| St. Albert | A | 2,546 | 70.27% | 1,077 | 29.73% | 3,623 | For | 92 | 8,184 | 45.39% |
| St. Paul | A | 1,321 | 58.40% | 941 | 41.60% | 2,262 | For | 18 | 6,080 | 37.50% |
| Stettler | A | 1,765 | 49.82% | 1,785 | 50.28% | 3,550 | Against | 9 | 6,743 | 52.78% |
| Stony Plain | A | 2,372 | 72.01% | 922 | 27.99% | 3,294 | For | 38 | 8,663 | 38.64% |
| Taber | A | 941 | 32.86% | 1,923 | 67.14% | 2,864 | Against | 35 | 6,627 | 43.75% |
| Vegreville | A | 1,187 | 56.04% | 931 | 43.96% | 2,118 | For | 32 | 5,795 | 37.10% |
| Vermilion | A | 1,258 | 53.92% | 1,075 | 46.08% | 2,333 | For | 15 | 5,758 | 40.79% |
| Wainwright | A | 1,631 | 49.35% | 1,674 | 50.65% | 3,305 | Against | 33 | 6,897 | 48.40% |
| Warner | A | 762 | 35.26% | 1,399 | 64.74% | 2,161 | Against | 21 | 5,197 | 41.99% |
| Wetaskiwin | A | 1,773 | 48.78% | 1,892 | 51.62% | 3,665 | Against | 9 | 7,650 | 48.03% |
| Willingdon | A | 1,400 | 76.63% | 427 | 23.37% | 1,827 | For | 19 | 5,979 | 30.88% |
