= Alex Gordey =

Canadian politician

Alexander "Alex" William Gordey

Member of the Legislative Assembly of Alberta
- In office June 18, 1959 – June 17, 1963
- Preceded by: Stanley Ruzycki
- Constituency: Vegreville
- In office June 17, 1963 – August 30, 1971
- Succeeded by: John Batiuk
- Constituency: Vegreville-Bruce

Personal details
- Born: March 16, 1912 Boroutz, Western Ukraine
- Died: November 9, 1983 (aged 71) Edmonton, Alberta
- Party: Social Credit
- Spouse: Rita Harris
- Occupation: politician

Alexander "Alex" William Gordey was a provincial politician from Alberta, Canada. He served as a member of the Legislative Assembly of Alberta from 1959 to 1971 sitting with the Social Credit caucus in government.

== Political career ==
Gordey ran for a seat to the Alberta Legislature in the 1959 Alberta general election in the electoral district of Vegreville as the Social Credit candidate. Gordey defeated incumbent Stanley Ruzycki and two other candidates by a large margin to pick up the seat for his party.

The 1963 boundary redistribution redistributed Gordey's riding, the riding became Vegreville-Bruce. Gordey ran for a second term in office in the new district for the election held that year. He faced four other candidates and won taking just over half of the popular vote.

Gordey ran for a third term in office in the 1967 Alberta general election. He faced a strong challenge from Progressive Conservative candidate Mike Kawulych but managed to hold his seat.

The 1971 boundary redistribution altered Vegreville-Bruce to once again become the riding of Vegreville. Gordey ran for his fourth term in the 1971 Alberta general election but was defeated by Progressive Conservative candidate John Batiuk.
