= Deep Six (Alberta politics) =

The Deep Six were a group of six Progressive Conservative Members of the Legislative Assembly of Alberta first elected in the 1993 provincial election. Sitting as backbenchers, they supported the government of Ralph Klein in its spending cuts to reduce the provincial deficit, and advocated still larger and swifter cuts. Their name came from their support for deep spending cuts and from their physical location in the Legislature—deep in the backbenches. According to Klein strategist Rod Love, Klein would ask to be briefed on the group's activities every morning of his first term.

The members of the Deep Six were Jon Havelock, Mark Hlady, Lyle Oberg, Murray Smith, Ed Stelmach, and Lorne Taylor. Klein would later bring five of these six into his cabinet—Smith became Minister of Economic Development and Tourism in September 1994, and Havelock, Oberg, Stelmach, and Taylor were brought in after the 1997 election. Oberg and Stelmach were both candidates to succeed Klein in the 2006 leadership election, with Stelmach winning and becoming Premier.
