= Bruce (Alberta provincial electoral district) =

Defunct provincial electoral district in Alberta, Canada

Alberta electoral district

Defunct provincial electoral district
- Legislature: Legislative Assembly of Alberta
- District created: 1940
- District abolished: 1963
- First contested: 1940
- Last contested: 1959

Bruce was a provincial electoral district in Alberta, Canada, mandated to return a single member to the Legislative Assembly of Alberta from 1940 to 1963.

== History ==
The Bruce electoral district was formed from the Vegreville, Sedgewick, Camrose electoral districts prior to the 1940 Alberta general election. The Acadia electoral district would be abolished and the Vermilion and Vegreville-Bruce electoral districts would be formed in its place prior to the 1963 Alberta general election.

=== Members of the Legislative Assembly (MLAs) ===
Members of the Legislative Assembly for Bruce
Assembly	Years	Member	Party
See Vegreville electoral district from 1909-1940; Sedgewickelectoral district from 1909-1940 and Camrose electoral district from 1909-1940
9th	1940–1944	James L. McPherson	Social Credit
10th	1944–1948	James L. McPherson	Social Credit
11th	1948–1952	Earl M. Hardy	Social Credit
12th	1952–1955	Earl M. Hardy	Social Credit
13th	1955–1959	Earl M. Hardy	Social Credit
14th	1959–1963	Earl M. Hardy	Social Credit
See Vermilion electoral district from 1963-1971 and Vegreville-Bruce electoral district from 1963-1971

== Election results ==
=== 1940 ===
1940 Alberta general election
Party	Candidate	Votes	%	±%
First count
Social Credit	James L. McPherson	2,018	48.01%	–
Independent	B. C. Gilpin	1,433	34.09%	–
Co-operative Commonwealth	E. A. Moen	752	9.19%	–
Total		4,203	–	–
Ballot transfer results
Social Credit	James L. McPherson	2,203	55.30%	–
Independent	B. C. Gilpin	1,781	44.70%	–
Total		3,984	–	–
Rejected, spoiled and declined		122	–	–
Eligible electors / turnout		6,027	71.76%	–
Social Credit pickup new district.				
Source(s) Source: "Bruce Official Results 1940 Alberta general election". Alberta Heritage Community Foundation. Instant-runoff voting requires a candidate to receive a plurality (greater than 50%) of the votes. As no candidate received a plurality of votes, the bottom candidate was eliminated and their 2nd place votes were applied to both other candidates until one received a plurality

=== 1944 ===
1944 Alberta general election
Party	Candidate	Votes	%	±%
Social Credit	James L. McPherson	2,024	53.76%	-5.75%
Co-operative Commonwealth	S. Lefsrud	1,274	33.84%	24.65%
Independent	B. C. Gilpin	467	12.40%	-21.69%
Total		3,765	–	–
Rejected, spoiled and declined		97	–	–
Eligible electors / turnout		5,745	67.22%	-4.54%
Social Credit hold		Swing		9.96%
Source(s) Source: "Bruce Official Results 1944 Alberta general election". Alberta Heritage Community Foundation.

=== 1948 ===
1948 Alberta general election
Party	Candidate	Votes	%	±%
Social Credit	Earl M. Hardy	2,248	57.01%	3.25%
Co-operative Commonwealth	Beauchamp B. Starky	1,080	27.39%	-6.45%
Liberal	Alfred Lefsrud	615	15.60%	–
Total		3,943	–	–
Rejected, spoiled and declined		191	–	–
Eligible electors / turnout		6,456	64.03%	-3.19%
Social Credit hold		Swing		4.85%
Source(s) Source: "Bruce Official Results 1948 Alberta general election". Alberta Heritage Community Foundation.

=== 1952 ===
1952 Alberta general election
Party	Candidate	Votes	%	±%
Social Credit	Earl M. Hardy	2,157	52.32%	-4.70%
Co-operative Commonwealth	Sigurd Lefsrud	1,210	29.35%	1.96%
Liberal	Edwin F. Watson	756	18.34%	2.74%
Total		4,123	–	–
Rejected, spoiled and declined		278	–	–
Eligible electors / turnout		6,478	67.94%	3.90%
Social Credit hold		Swing		-3.33%
Source(s) Source: "Bruce Official Results 1952 Alberta general election". Alberta Heritage Community Foundation.

=== 1955 ===
1955 Alberta general election
Party	Candidate	Votes	%	±%
First count
Social Credit	Earl M. Hardy	1,978	43.27%	-8.95%
Liberal	Clare M. Liden	1,525	33.36%	15.04%
Co-operative Commonwealth	Nancy Zaseybida	998	16.85%	-12.50%
Conservative	Oliver H. Gunderson	70	1.18%	–
Total		4,571	–	–
Ballot transfer results
Social Credit	Earl M. Hardy	2,105	50.87%	–
Liberal	Clare M. Liden	2,033	49.13%	–
Total		4,138	–	–
Rejected, spoiled and declined		261	–	–
Eligible electors / turnout		6,507	74.26%	6.32%
Social Credit hold		Swing		-5.00%
Source(s) Source: "Bruce Official Results 1955 Alberta general election". Alberta Heritage Community Foundation.

=== 1959 ===
1959 Alberta general election
Party	Candidate	Votes	%	±%
Social Credit	Earl M. Hardy	2,324	55.22%	-39.72%
Progressive Conservative	Clifford G. Patterson	833	19.79%	–
Liberal	Clare L. Liden	534	12.69%	-56.31%
Co-operative Commonwealth	Edward I. Thompson	518	12.31%	-4.55%
Total		4,209	–	–
Rejected, spoiled and declined		8	–	–
Eligible electors / turnout		6,441	65.47%	-8.79%
Social Credit hold		Swing		11.23%
Source(s) Source: "Bruce Official Results 1959 Alberta general election". Alberta Heritage Community Foundation.

== Plebiscite results ==
=== 1957 liquor plebiscite ===
1957 Alberta liquor plebiscite results: Bruce
Question A: Do you approve additional types of outlets for the sale of beer, wine and spirituous liquor subject to a local vote?
Ballot choice	Votes	%
No	1,691	63.31%
Yes	980	36.69%
Total votes	2,671	100%
Rejected, spoiled and declined	21	
6,108 eligible electors, turnout 44.07%

On October 30, 1957, a stand-alone plebiscite was held province wide in all 50 of the then current provincial electoral districts in Alberta. The government decided to consult Alberta voters to decide on liquor sales and mixed drinking after a divisive debate in the legislature. The plebiscite was intended to deal with the growing demand for reforming antiquated liquor control laws.

The plebiscite was conducted in two parts. Question A, asked in all districts, asked the voters if the sale of liquor should be expanded in Alberta, while Question B, asked in a handful of districts within the corporate limits of Calgary and Edmonton, asked if men and women should be allowed to drink together in establishments.

Province wide Question A of the plebiscite passed in 33 of the 50 districts while Question B passed in all five districts. Bruce voted against the proposal by an overwhelming margin. The voter turnout in the district was almost equal to the province wide average of 46%.

Official district returns were released to the public on December 31, 1957. The Social Credit government in power at the time did not consider the results binding. However the results of the vote led the government to repeal all existing liquor legislation and introduce an entirely new Liquor Act.

Municipal districts lying inside electoral districts that voted against the plebiscite such as Bruce were designated Local Option Zones by the Alberta Liquor Control Board and considered effective dry zones. Business owners who wanted a licence had to petition for a binding municipal plebiscite in order to be granted a licence.

== See also ==
- List of Alberta provincial electoral districts
- Canadian provincial electoral districts
