= Michael Ponich =

Canadian politician

Member of the Legislative Assembly of Alberta
- In office 1944–1955
- Preceded by: George Woytkiw
- Succeeded by: Stanley Ruzycki
- Constituency: Vegreville

Personal details
- Born: November 20, 1905 Pakan, Alberta
- Died: December 3, 1957 (aged 52) Alberta, Canada
- Party: Social Credit

Michael Herbert Ponich (November 20, 1905 – December 3, 1957) was a provincial politician from Alberta, Canada. He served as a member of the Legislative Assembly of Alberta from 1944 to 1955, sitting with the Social Credit caucus in government.
