= Stanley Ruzycki =

Canadian politician

Stanley Nicholas Ruzycki

Member of the Legislative Assembly of Alberta
- In office June 29, 1955 – June 18, 1959
- Preceded by: Michael Ponich
- Succeeded by: Alex Gordey
- Constituency: Vegreville

Personal details
- Born: December 31, 1915 Mundare, Alberta
- Died: October 15, 2004 (aged 88)
- Party: Co-operative Commonwealth Federation
- Occupation: teacher and politician

Stanley Nicholas Ruzycki (December 31, 1915 – October 15, 2004) was a politician from Alberta, Canada. He served in the Legislative Assembly of Alberta from 1955 to 1959 as one of two members of the Co-operative Commonwealth Federation caucus.

== Political career ==
Ruzycki first ran for a seat in the Alberta Legislature in the 1952 general election as a Co-operative Commonwealth candidate in the electoral district of Vegreville. He was defeated on the second count by incumbent Michael Ponich.

Ruzycki faced Ponich again in the 1955 general election; this time Ruzycki defeated Ponich on the second count to pick up the seat for his party. In the 1959 general election he was defeated by Social Credit candidate Alex Gordey.
