= John Batiuk =

Canadian politician

John S. Batiuk

Member of the Legislative Assembly of Alberta
- In office August 30, 1971 – May 8, 1986
- Preceded by: Alex Gordey
- Succeeded by: Derek Fox
- Constituency: Vegreville

Personal details
- Born: March 20, 1923 Mundare, Alberta
- Died: August 1, 2005 (aged 82) Mundare, Alberta
- Party: Progressive Conservative

John S. Batiuk (March 20, 1923 – August 1, 2005) was a municipal and provincial level politician from Alberta, Canada. He served as a member of the Legislative Assembly of Alberta from 1971 to 1986. Batiuk sat with the governing Progressive Conservative caucus.

== Political career ==
Batiuk began his political career in 1968 when he ran for a seat on the newly created Municipal District of Lamont No, 82. He represented Division 1 until 1974.

Batiuk moved to provincial politics running for a seat to the Alberta Legislature for the first time in the 1971 Alberta general election. He defeated incumbent Alex Gordey to win the redistributed electoral district of Vegreville and pick it up for the Progressive Conservatives who had formed government for the first time in that election. Despite winning provincial office Batiuk did not give up his municipal seat until his term expired.

Batiuk won a slightly higher popular vote running for a second term in the 1975 Alberta general election. He was re-elected to his third term in office in the 1979 general election winning a slightly higher popular vote. The election was still closely contested with the NDP who won also won a close second in 1975.

Batiuk won his fourth and final term in the 1982 general election. He retired from provincial politics at the dissolution of the legislature in 1986.
