= Archie Matheson =

Canadian politician

Archibald Malcolm Matheson
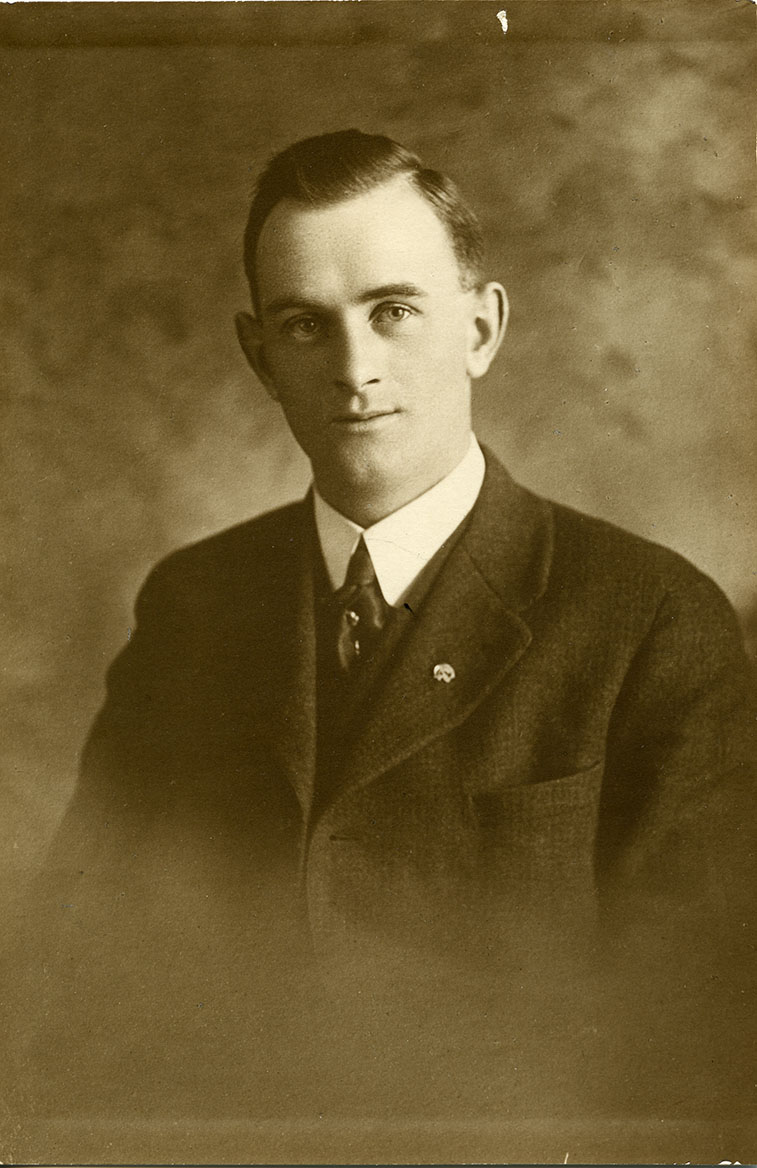

Member of the Legislative Assembly of Alberta
- In office July 18, 1921 – August 22, 1935
- Preceded by: Joseph S. McCallum
- Succeeded by: James McPherson
- Constituency: Vegreville

Personal details
- Born: March 31, 1891; Glenlivet, Banffshire, Scotland
- Died: September 30, 1978 (aged 87); Edmonton, Alberta, Canada
- Political party: United Farmers of Alberta
- Occupation: Farmer

Archibald Malcolm (Archie) Matheson was a Canadian politician who represented Vegreville in the Legislative Assembly of Alberta from 1921 until 1935. He was elected in the 1921 election and re-elected in 1926 and 1930 as a member of the United Farmers of Alberta (UFA), which was the governing party of his entire time in office.

Despite this, Matheson frequently opposed government policy. In January 1923 he objected to Herbert Greenfield's government's continued support of prohibition, remarking "This government has acted as philosopher, guide, and God to the people long enough." In 1926, he expressed frustration with the John Brownlee government's delay in providing a new police station for his riding, going so far as to threaten to raise the matter in the legislature. In February 1928, he led the opposition to Brownlee's proposal to exempt lawyers and trust companies wishing to act as real estate agents from the new $1,000 bond required of others wishing to do so. Matheson proposed eliminating this exemption and raising the amount of the bond to $5,000. He was partially successful: the bond remained at $1,000 and trust companies remained exempt, but lawyers were barred from the real estate business altogether. Matheson was also an active opponent of the Sexual Sterilization Act of Alberta, and attempted to adjourn debate before it came to a vote. When he failed, he absented himself from the final vote as a sign of protest. He was a vocal advocate for farmers and in the 1930s proposed unsuccessfully that the government declare a moratorium on the collection of debts from them.

His aggressive approach to the government sometimes paid off, as in his lobbying for the construction of a courthouse in Vegreville. In 1929 Vegreville was designated as a judicial subdistrict, which entitled it to court offices, a deputy sheriff, and a clerk of court. The following year it was awarded a full courthouse.

Matheson sought re-election in the 1935 election, but finished a distant third, joining every UFA candidate in the province in defeat, as William Aberhart's new Social Credit League achieved a large majority.

== Electoral record ==
1935 Alberta general election results (Vegreville)		Turnout 82.5%	
Affiliation	Candidate	Votes	%
Second count
Social Credit	James McPherson	3,047	59.60%
Liberal	Charles Gordon	2,065	40.40%
First count
Social Credit	James McPherson	2,817	50.29%
Liberal	Charles Gordon	1,681	30.01%
United Farmers	Archie Matheson	995	17.76%
Conservative	M. H. Penish	109	1.95%
1930 Alberta general election results (Vegreville)		Turnout 72.9%	
Affiliation	Candidate	Votes	%
United Farmers	Archie Matheson	2,364	57.36%
Liberal	Harry A. White	1,757	42.64%
1926 Alberta general election results (Vegreville)		Turnout 71.1%	
Second count
United Farmers	Archie Matheson	2,217	56.57%
Liberal	J. D. Hannan	1,702	43.43%
First count
United Farmers	Archie Matheson	1,986	45.09%
Liberal	J. D. Hannan	1,395	31.67%
Conservative	A. W. Fraser687	15.60%	
Independent United Farmers of Alberta	P. Bahry	337	7.65%
1921 Alberta general election results (Vegreville)		Turnout 98.0%	
Affiliation	Candidate	Votes	%
United Farmers	Archie Matheson	3,047	69.69%
Liberal	Joseph S. McCallum	1,325	30.31%
