= Joseph S. McCallum =

Canadian politician

Joseph Seeley McCallum
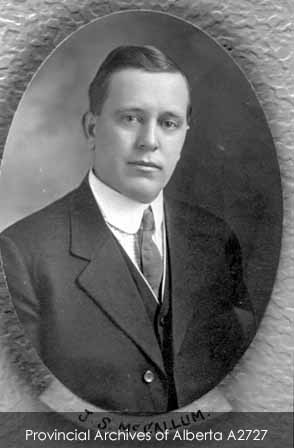

Member of the Legislative Assembly of Alberta
- In office April 17, 1913 – July 18, 1921
- Preceded by: James Bismark Holden
- Succeeded by: Archie Matheson
- Constituency: Vegreville

Personal details
- Born: July 9, 1884 Renfrew, Ontario
- Died: July 22, 1945 (aged 61) Edmonton, Alberta
- Party: Liberal Party

Joseph Seeley McCallum (July 9, 1884 – July 22, 1945) was a Canadian politician from Alberta.

== Early life ==
Joseph Seeley McCallum was born July 9, 1884, in Renfrew, Ontario, to Angus McCallum and wife Jane Seeley. His family moved to Beaver Lake, Alberta in 1892. He married Catherine Elizabeth McCallum on January 20, 1905.

== Political life ==
McCallum was first elected to the Alberta Legislature in the 1913 Alberta general election. He defeated independent candidate Peter Savarich by a wide and comfortable margin to earn his first term in office. Throughout his career in the Legislature he served as a backbencher in the provincial Liberal government.

McCallum stood for re-election in the 1917 Alberta general election. This time he defeated Conservative candidate Malcolm Gordon to earn his second term in office. In his bid for a third term in office in the 1921 Alberta general election, McCallum would be defeated by Archie Matheson a candidate from the United Farmers of Alberta.

After his defeat from provincial politics McCallum made two attempts to gain a seat in the House of Commons of Canada. The first time he ran he was a candidate of Unknown affiliation but most likely ran for the Liberal Party of Canada in the Vegreville in the 1926 Canadian federal election. He was defeated by United Farmers of Alberta candidate Michael Luchovich. McCallum and Luchovich would face each other again in the 1935 Canadian federal election this time both men would be defeated by Social Credit candidate William Hayhurst. He died in Edmonton in 1945.

Legislative Assembly of Alberta
Preceded by James Bismark Holden	MLA Vegreville; 1913-1921	Succeeded by Archie Matheson
