= George Woytkiw =

Canadian politician

Member of the Legislative Assembly of Alberta
- In office 1940–1944
- Preceded by: James L. McPherson
- Succeeded by: Solon Earl Low
- Constituency: Vegreville

Personal details
- Born: July 5, 1903 Trail, British Columbia, Canada
- Died: August 31, 1956 (aged 53) Edmonton, Alberta, Canada
- Party: Social Credit Party of Alberta
- Occupation: Civil servant

George Woytkiw (July 5, 1903 – August 31, 1956) was a Canadian provincial politician in Alberta. He served briefly as a member of the Legislative Assembly of Alberta, representing the constituency of Vegreville as a member of the Social Credit Party.

Woytkiw assumed office in 1940. His tenure in the legislature was short; he resigned his seat later that year following a by-election held on June 20, 1940, after which Solon Earl Low succeeded him as the member for Vegreville.

He was born in Trail, British Columbia, and died in Edmonton, Alberta, in 1956.
