= Alberta Royalty Review =

The 2007 Alberta Royalty Review was an independent panel, chaired by William M. Hunter, established by the government of Alberta to review the level of resource royalties collected by the provincial government from petroleum and natural gas companies.

In their final report entitled "Our Fair Share" released on September 18, 2007, the panel concluded that Albertans, who own their natural resources, were not receiving their "fair share" from energy development. Royalty rates and formulas had "not kept pace with changes in the resource base and world energy markets." As a result of the review new regulations came into effect under the Alberta Mines and Minerals Act including the Petroleum Royalty Regulation, 2009, and the Natural Gas Royalty Regulation, 2009. The government of Alberta expected to collect approximately $2 billion annually with new royalty formulas implemented in 2009. Instead of an increase in royalties on oil and gas, Alberta collected $13.5 billion less from 2009 to 2014 with the new formula. There was a flaw in the 2009 New Well Royalty Rate formula which was in effect by May 1, 2011, regarding the royalties on gas which had provided almost 67% of total royalties collected by Alberta prior to 2009. Under the 2009 formula applied to Natural Gas and By-products represented a decrease from the previous fixed rates. With this formula gas royalties declined by approximately $5 billion per year and provided only 17% of total royalties. In 2008 the global price of oil plummeted from an all-time high of $145 a barrel on July 8, 2008, to $32 a barrel later in 2008 resulting in "the cancellation of many energy projects" in Alberta. By 2015 several of these oil projects had not resumed. In spite of this, Alberta collected $2 billion in oil sands royalties in the post-2009 period with the new rate of 20% compared to $1.5 billion from 2004 to 2009 with the old rate of 15%.

== Average royalty rates ==
Average Annual Royalty 2004–2014 compiled by Jim Roy, Parkland Institute 2015
	Royalty before AAR 2004–2009 ($billions)	Royalty after AAR 2009–2014 ($billions)	Difference ($ billions)	Royalty % rate before 2009	Royalty % rate after 2009
Oil	$1.5	$2	$0.5	15%	20%
Gas	$6.3	$1.1	-$5.2	19%	8%
Oil Sands	$1.9	$3.9	$2	3%	10%
Total	$9.7	$7	-$2.7	14%	11%
Five-year total	$48.4	$35	-$13.5	14%	11%

Year by Year total revenue collected based on Energy Alberta 2012
year	$billions
2006/2007	$12.260
2007/2008	$11.271
2008/2009	$12.176
2009/2010	$6.189
2010/2011	$8.555
2011/2012	$11.765
2012/2013	$3.56

== Background ==
In areas surveyed and homesteaded early in Alberta's history all sub-soil resource rights belong to the land owner, but in the areas surveyed later or in the massive crown land areas of the northern half of the province where the current productive oil fields are located, the Crown, represented by the provincial government, owns all sub-soil resources.

Unlike many other oil-producing jurisdictions such as Saudi Arabia or Norway, Alberta does not have a National Oil Company that owns and exploits all petroleum resources. Instead privately owned oil companies of various sizes, from inside and outside Canada are encouraged to drill for oil and gas or mine oil sands on Crown land, and in exchange pay a royalty.

In 1930, the Natural Resources Transfer Act, shifted control of natural resources in Alberta from the federal government to the provincial government.

=== Royalty rates ===
In 1931 the Alberta government set the royalty rate at five per cent on oil and gas, creating a rift with the oil industry.

In 1971, soon after winning a majority government for the Progressive Conservatives in 1971, then-premier Peter Lougheed moved to increase Alberta's share of royalties creating hostilities with the oil industry. At that time the price of oil was rising globally as the influence of the newly formed Organization of Petroleum Exporting Countries increased.

In 1986 when the price of oil bottomed at US$10 a barrel, Don Getty, who was premier from 1985 to 1992, responded by providing the oil industry with $250 million in incentives and royalty cuts. By the end of 1986 Alberta had granted another nine-month cut from 12% to 1% in royalties at the Suncor oilsands.

Ralph Klein lowered royalties during the early 1990s to spur investment in the oil sands that faced an uncertain future with the low price of oil at that time. In 1997 the Alberta government set a "generic royalty formula for oil sands projects" using the "1% and 25% formula." In 2001 the oil and gas industry represented 23 percent of Alberta's GDP.

In 2006, a year before becoming Premier of Alberta, Ed Stelmach announced his commitment to reviewing royalty rates for the oil sands as well as for conventional oil and natural gas. As Premier in 2007 he tasked then-Minister of Finance Lyle Oberg to lead the Alberta Royalty Review process. By 2007 The oil and gas industry represented 19 percent of the province's GDP.

In 2006-7 the oil sands royalty revenue was $2.411 billion. In 2007/08 it rose to $2.913 billion and it continued to rise in 2008/09 to $2.973 billion. Following the revised Alberta Royalty Regime it fell in 2009/10 to $1.008 billion. In that year Alberta's total resource revenue "fell below $7 billion...when the world economy was in the grip of recession."

In February 2012 the Province of Alberta "expected $13.4 billion in revenue from non-renewable resources in 2013–14. By January 2013 the province was anticipating only $7.4 billion. "30 per cent of Alberta's approximately $40-billion budget is funded through oil and gas revenues. Bitumen royalties represent about half of that total." In 2009/10 royalties from the oil sands amounted to $1.008 billion (Budget 2009 cited in Energy Alberta 2009.

In order to accelerate development of the oil sands, the federal and provincial governments more closely aligned taxation of the oil sands with other surface mining resulting in "charging one per cent of a project's gross revenues until the project's investment costs are paid in full at which point rates increased to 25 per cent of net revenue. These policy changes and higher oil prices after 2003 had the desired effect of accelerating the development of the oil sands industry. "A revised Alberta Royalty Regime was implemented on January 1, 2009 through which each oil sands project pays a gross revenue royalty rate of 1%.

The Oil and Gas Fiscal Regimes described how royalty payments were calculated:

After an oil sands royalty project reaches payout, the royalty payable to the Crown is equal to the greater of: (a) the gross revenue royalty (1% - 9%) for the period, and (b) the royalty percentage (25% - 40%) of net revenue for the period. Effective January 1, 2009 the royalty percentage of net revenue is also indexed to the Canadian dollar price of WTI. It is 25% when the WTI price is less than or equal to $55/bbl, rising linearly to a maximum of 40% when the price reaches $120/bbl. For royalty purposes, net revenue equals project revenue less allowed costs.

— Oil and Gas Fiscal Regimes

When the price of oil per barrel is less than or equal to $55/bbl indexed against West Texas Intermediate (WTI) (Oil and Gas Fiscal Regimes 2011:30) (Indexed to the Canadian dollar price of WTI) to a maximum of 9%). When the price of oil per barrel is less than or equal to $120/ bbl indexed against WTI "payout."

Payout refers "the first time when the developer has recovered all the allowed costs of the project, including a return allowance on those costs equal to the Government of Canada long-term bond rate ["LTBR"].

In order to encourage growth and prosperity and due to the extremely high cost of exploration, research and development, oil sands and mining operations pay no corporate, federal, provincial taxes or government royalties other than personal income taxes as companies often remain in a loss position for tax and royalty purposes for many years. Defining a loss position becomes increasingly complex when vertically-integrated multi-national energy companies are involved. Suncor claims their realized losses were legitimate and that Canada Revenue Agency (CRA) is unfairly claiming "$1.2-billion" in taxes which is jeopardizing their operations.

"Bitumen Valuation Methodology (BVM) is a method to determine for royalty purposes a value for bitumen produced in oil sands projects and either upgraded on-site or sold or transferred to affiliates. The BVM ensures that Alberta receives market value for its bitumen production, taken in cash or bitumen royalty-in-kind, through the royalty formula. Western Canadian Select (WCS), a grade or blend of Alberta bitumens, diluents (a product such as naphtha or condensate which is added to increase the ability of the oil to flow through a pipeline) and conventional heavy oils, developed by Alberta producers and stored and valued at Hardisty, AB was determined to be the best reference crude price in the development of a BVM."

Price WTI C $/bbl	Royalty Rate on Gross Revenue	Royalty Rate on Net Revenue
Below C$55	1.00%	5.00%
C$60	1.62%	26.15%
C$75	3.46%	29.62%
C$100	6.54%	35.38%
Above C$125	9.00%	40.00%

By the end of 2001 the price of oil was as low as $20 a barrel. By July 8, 2008 the price of oil steadily increased until it reached an all-time high of $145 a barrel. Later in 2008 the price of oil plummeted to $32 a barrel resulting in "the cancellation of many energy projects" in Alberta. By 2015 several of these oil projects had not resumed.

In 2009/2010 the Alberta government collected $6.1 billion in royalties representing a drop of $3 billion.

According to a 2015 University of Alberta's Parkland Institute report by Jim Roy, who was a senior advisor for Royalty Policy for Alberta Energy from 1985 to 1993, from 2010 to 2015 Alberta collected $13.5 billion less in royalty than in the previous five years. Instead of getting the expected $2 billion per year increase, Alberta saw a $3 billion per year decrease. The decrease was composed of a $5 billion per year decrease in gas royalty partially offset by increases in oil royalty and oil sands royalty. The total value of hydrocarbon production was about the same during each five-year period.

From October 2009 to 2013/14 bitumen and crude oil royalties "averaged $6.2 billion and contributed just under 16 per cent to government revenues on an annual basis." The Alberta government predicted in its 2014/15 fiscal-year budget that there would be "an annual average of $8.0 billion in bitumen and crude oil royalties over the next three fiscal years (2014/15 to 2016/17) and an increase in the annual share of bitumen and crude oil royalties to over 17 per cent of government revenues."

In 2012–2013 $3.56 billion in royalties were collected from the oil sands.

== Global price of oil ==
Royalty rates on oil in Alberta are based on the price of West Texas Intermediate, the benchmark in oil pricing in North America and the underlying commodity of New York Mercantile Exchange's oil futures contracts. Western Canadian Select is the benchmark crude for Albertan oil.

== Findings ==
In a letter addressed to the Alberta Finance Minister in September 2007, the Chairman of the 2007 Alberta Royalty Review Bill Hunter, claimed "Albertans do not receive their fair share from energy development and they have not, in fact, been receiving their fair share for some time."

The panel's report not only recommended increased royal rates for all three major resources (conventional oil, natural gas, and oilsands) but also insisted that the government had failed to collect royalties already owed.

The recommended rate increase amounted to a 20% increase or an extra $2 billion per year.

== Response ==
Some supporters of the oil industry responded to the 2007 Review with concerns that Calgary would become the "Caracas on the Bow" in the province of "Albertastan."

In 2007 the political response was highly polarized, with the parties of the left, the Alberta Liberals and Alberta New Democrats, criticizing the government for failing to get Alberta's "fair share" and, in effect, subsidizing oil companies at the expense of the public purse. They failed to make any gains against the Conservatives during the Alberta provincial general election of 2008, however, despite a record low turnout caused primarily by traditional Tory supporters staying home.

The highly respected global energy consultancy Wood Mackenzie released a study in September 2007, in which they ranked Alberta's 2007 fiscal regime for oil sands as 11th most favourable out of 100 jurisdictions globally. If all of the recommendations of the report [were] implemented, the report indicated "that the oil sand terms would still rank 44 out of 100 countries in terms of attractiveness." In 2007 the proposed 64% government take remained well below the average government take of 74% calculated by Wood Mackenzie for the other countries in the study (this take included government equity participations in many countries). The Wood Mackenzie study confirms the findings of the Panel in this regard."

In September 2007, TD Bank Financial Group Chief economist, Don Drummond and Derek Burelton claimed Alberta's economy would continue to thrive. The TD report expected Alberta's response to the ARR to be "the next major event," TD economists suggested that many of the review Panel's recommendations made economic sense. TD Economics had designated the Calgary-Edmonton Corridor as Canada's western economic tiger in 2003. From 1993 to 2003, Calgary-Edmonton Corridor "registered explosive real economic growth and population increases, surpassing rates chalked up in the majority of North American urban centres." By 2003 oil and gas royalty revenues were surging and the Corridor was "the only urban region in Canada to rival U.S. metropolitan areas in terms of both productivity and standard of living."

== Repercussions ==
The Conservatives partially implemented the panel's recommendations. This coincided with a fall in oil prices during the 2008 financial crisis. Oil and gas companies, especially smaller companies, complained that this hurt their bottom line, and threatened to move out of the province or shut down. In 2008 the global price of oil plummeted from $145 /barrel to $32/barrel and many energy projects left the province or were shut down in Alberta. Some never resumed. Alberta collected $2 billion in oil sands royalties in the post-2009 period with the new rate of 20%.

The Alberta government announced on March 11, 2010, that royalty rates effective in January 2011, would be rolled back cutting the maximum rate for conventional oil from 50% to 40% of revenues and cutting the maximum rate for natural gas from 50% to 36%. The large decrease in royalty starting in 2009 was mostly due to the way the gas formula automatically adjusted to the falling price for natural gas. The government introduced a "new well" incentive that capped royalty to a maximum of 5% during the first year of production. However, this incentive had no actual effect on gas royalty because the price-sensitive formula has set a negative royalty rate each month since being introduced. For almost all wells, the royalty formula defaults to the minimum royalty rate of 5%. Those on the right criticized the government for raising royalties and damaging profits in Alberta's most important industry, which they likened the "killing The Goose That Laid the Golden Eggs". Junior oil companies were instrumental in funding the upstart Wildrose Party which emerged in the Alberta provincial general election of 2012 as the major challenger to the governing Tories, and became the Official Opposition.

The repercussion for royalties was that in 2009/2010, the Alberta government collected $6.1 billion in royalties for the oil and gas sector. This was a drop of $3 billion. Over the next five years, Alberta collected $13.5 billion less in royalty than in the previous five years. Instead of getting the expected $2 billion per year increase, Alberta saw a $3 billion per year decrease. The decrease was composed of a $5 billion per year decrease in gas royalty partially offset by increases in oil royalty and oil sands royalty. The total value of hydrocarbon production was about the same during each five-year period.
