= 1959 Alberta general election =

General election in Alberta, Canada

- June 18, 1959

65 seats in the Legislative Assembly of Alberta 33 seats were needed for a majority
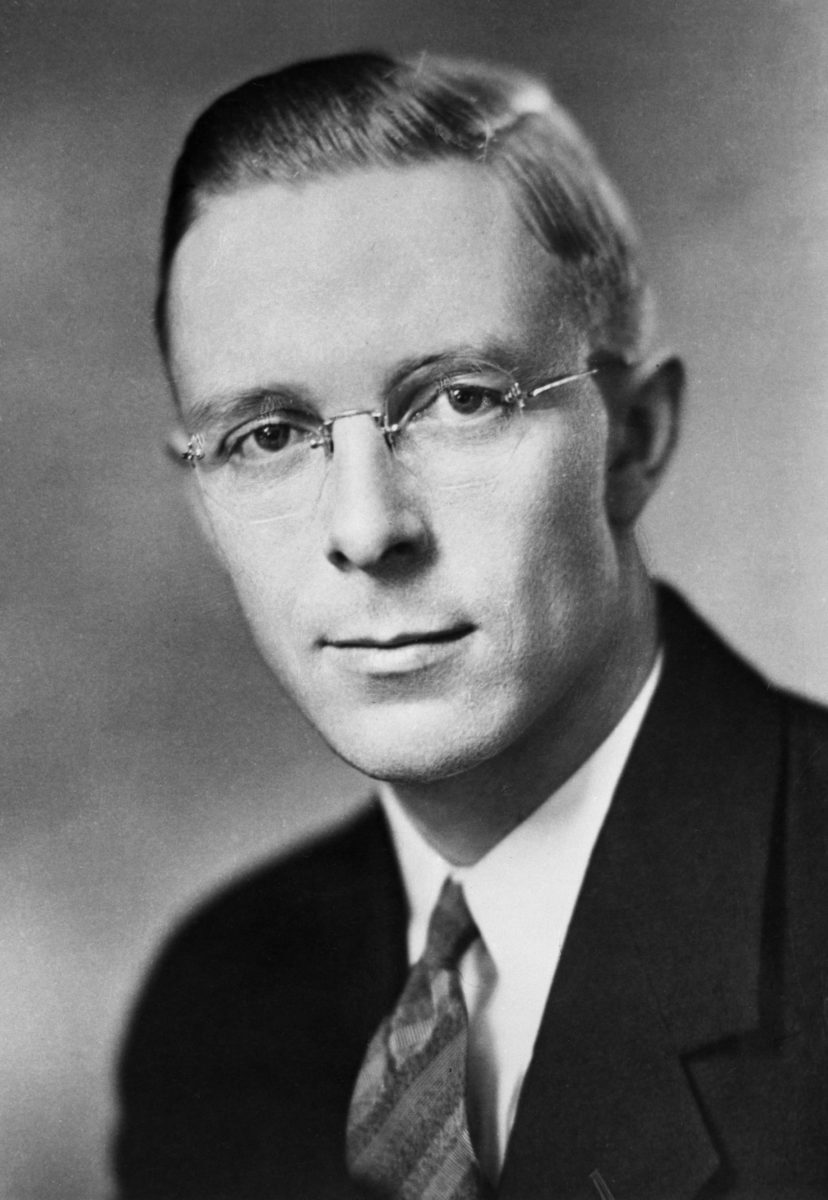

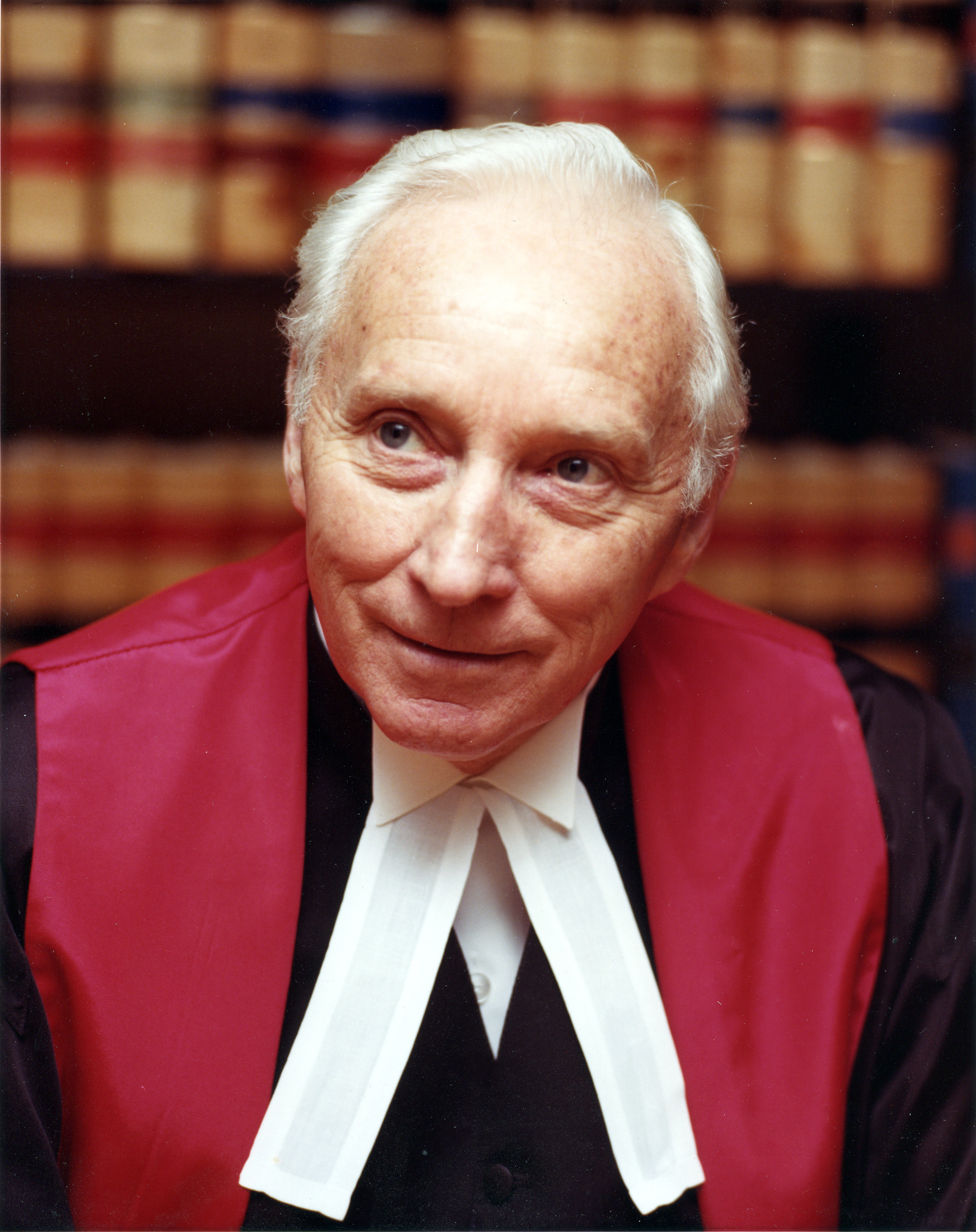

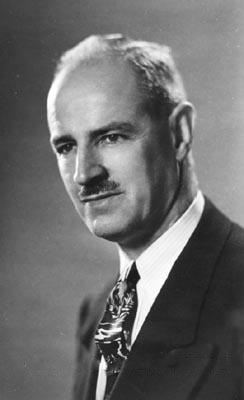
	Majority party	Minority party
Leader	Ernest Manning	Cam Kirby
Party	Social Credit	Progressive Conservative
Leader since	May 31, 1943	1958
Leader's seat	Strathcona East	Red Deer (lost re-election)
Last election	37 seats, 46.4%	3 seats, 9.2%
Seats before	37	3
Seats won	61	1
Seat change	▲24	▼2
Popular vote	230,283	98,730
Percentage	55.7%	23.9%
Swing	▲9.3%	▲14.7%
	Third party	Fourth party
		CCF
Leader	Grant MacEwan	Floyd Albin Johnson
Party	Liberal	Co-operative Commonwealth
Leader since	November 1, 1958	1957
Leader's seat	Calgary-North (lost re-election)	ran in Denvegan (lost)
Last election	15 seats, 31.1%	2 seats, 8.2%
Seats before	15	2
Seats won	1	0
Seat change	▼14	▼2
Popular vote	57,408	17,899
Percentage	13.9%	4.3%
Swing	▼17.2%	▼3.9%
Premier before election
Ernest Manning
Social Credit
Premier after election
Ernest Manning
Social Credit

The 1959 Alberta general election was held on June 18, 1959, to elect members of the Legislative Assembly of Alberta.

Ernest C. Manning, in his fifth election as party leader and provincial premier, led the Social Credit Party to its seventh consecutive term in government, with 55% of the popular vote, and all but four of the sixty five seats in the legislature.

Social Credit was also helped by a split in the opposition vote: whereas in the 1955 election, opponents were largely united behind the Liberal Party, in this election the vote was divided between the Liberals and the resurgent Progressive Conservative Party under the leadership of Cam Kirby, won almost 15% of the popular vote, placing ahead of the Liberals whose leader, Grant MacEwan lost his Calgary seat. The Tories and Liberals each won only one seat in the legislature while the Alberta CCF was shut out of the legislature for the first time in seventeen years. The other two opposition seat were taken by a Coalition candidate in Banff and an Independent Social Credit-er, both with strong local support.

== Change in voting system ==
Under an Act passed in 1956, Alberta's MLAs were now elected through First-past-the-post voting.

Previous to this election, the Social Credit government had done away with the Instant-runoff voting system in use in the rural constituencies, and the Single Transferable Vote system in Edmonton and Calgary, both of which had been in place since 1924. The move was made, the government claimed, to prevent the waste of votes caused by votes being declared spoiled due to unsatisfactory ballot marking, to bring Alberta in line with the other provinces who were using the First past the post systems, and to stop what the government called a conspiracy by the opposition parties to gang up on the SC government. The cancellation of STV and AV also standardized and simplified voting results across the province. Under single transferable vote and instant-runoff voting, final results would take up to five days to count the necessary vote transfers, before the last seat in a multiple-member district, Edmonton nor Calgary, was declared filled. (Manning always knew he was elected only hours after the polls closed due to his high vote count on the First Count.) The delay was especially large in the Edmonton, which elected seven members in 1955.

The 1955 election had produced a large opposition in the Legislature (large by Alberta standards anyway). Besides Liberals, Conservatives and CCF-ers electing MLAs in proportion to their numbers in the cities, the government had lost a few members in rural constituencies due to IRV, when they had received the largest portion of the vote in the constituency in the First Count (but not a majority) but were not elected to the seat due to another candidate receiving many vote transfers and eventually accumulating a majority of the vote themselves. The cancellation of IRV system in the rural districts was meant to prevent this in the future. The cancellation of STV in the cities gave the government a windfall of seats as well. SC candidates captured all the seats in Edmonton and all but one in Calgary although getting only 48 per cent of the Edmonton city vote and only 54 per cent of the Calgary vote.

== Electoral redistribution ==
An Act was passed in 1957 that provided for the increase in the number of MLAs from 61 to 65, upon the next election. The following changes were made:

Abolished	New
New districts
	Dunvegan (Note: from part of Peace River)
Abolition of multi-member districts
Calgary (six members)	Calgary Bowness; Calgary-Centre; Calgary-Glenmore; Calgary-North; Calgary-North East; Calgary-South East; Calgary-West
Edmonton (seven members)	Edmonton North; Edmonton-Centre; Edmonton-North East; Edmonton-North West; Edmonton-Norwood; Jasper West; Strathcona Centre; Strathcona East; Strathcona West

Prior to this election, one or more multi-member districts had been used in each Alberta election since 1909.

Alongside the change to FPTP, this increase necessitated the creation of 15 new districts, the most since 1913. The change was met by some harsh criticism at the time. The government was accused of changing the rules to help itself and for failing to consult the public, but it did not hurt the government's popularity at the polls.

== Results ==
Party	Party Leader	# of candidates	Seats			Popular Vote		
Party	Party Leader	# of candidates	1955	Elected	% Change	#	%	% Change
Social Credit	Ernest C. Manning	64	37	61	+64.9%	230,283	55.69%	+9.27%
Progressive Conservative	Cam Kirby	60	3	1	−66.7%	98,730	23.88%	+14.69%
Liberal	Grant MacEwan	51	15	1	−93.9%	57,408	13.88%	−17.25%
Independent Social Credit		2	1	1	-	2,393	0.58%	−0.14%
Coalition	Frank Gainer	1	1	1	-	2,279	0.55%	−0.66%
Co-operative Commonwealth	Floyd Albin Johnson	32	2	-	−100%	17,899	4.33%	−3.91%
Independent		2	1	-	−100%	3,640	0.88%	−0.25%
Labor-Progressive		4	-	-	-	884	0.21%	−0.69%
Total		216	61	65	+6.6%	413,516	100%	
Source: Elections Alberta

Popular vote
Social Credit	55.69%
PC	23.88%
Liberal	13.88%
CCF	4.33%
Ind. Social Credit	0.58%
Coalition	0.55%
Others	1.09%

Seats summary
Social Credit	93.85%
PC	1.54%
Liberal	1.54%
Ind. Social Credit	1.54%
Coalition	1.54%

== Results by riding ==
Electoral district	Candidates					Incumbent
Electoral district	Social Credit	PC	Liberal	CCF	Other	Incumbent
Acadia-Coronation	Marion Kelts; 2,450; 57.34%		James Leland Sims; 1,408; 32.95%	Lester A. Lindgren; 404; 9.45%		
Alexandra	Anders O. Aalborg; 2,354; 59.28%	A.H. Sweet; 1,248; 31.43%	Hilda A. Cross; 358; 9.02%			Anders O. Aalborg
Athabasca	Antonio Aloisio; 2,333; 54.17%	Robert Shopland; 707; 16.42%	Richard Edward Hall; 1,069; 24.82%		John Harry (Lab-Pro); 188; 4.36%	
Banff-Cochrane	Robin W. Echlin; 2,208; 48.94%				Francis Leo Gainer (Coal); 2,279; 50.51%	Francis Leo Gainer
Bonnyville	Karl Earnest Nordstrom; 2,465; 51.50%	Victor E. Justik; 860; 17.97%	Jake Josvanger; 1,447; 30.23%			Jake Josvanger
Bow Valley-Empress	William Delday; 2,863; 56.17%				Bryce C. Stringam (Ind.); 2213; 43.42%	Bryce C. Stringam
Bruce	Earl M. Hardy; 2,324; 55.11%	Clifford G. Patterson; 833; 19.75%	Clare L. Liden; 534; 12.66%	Edward I. Thompson; 518; 12.28%		
Calgary Bowness	Charles E. Johnston; 6,681; 59.09%	Bruce Norris; 3,194; 28.25%	Evelyn Leew; 1,018; 9.00%	Kay Halliday Grose; 379; 3.35%		
Calgary-Centre	Frederick C. Colborne; 4,824; 53.69%	Runo Carl Berglund; 2,642; 29.40%	Gordon Arnell; 1,154; 12.84%	Grant McHardy; 349; 3.88%		
Calgary-Glenmore	A. Ross Lawson; 4,681; 40.58%	Ernest S. Watkins; 4,893; 42.42%	Reg. Clarkson; 1,916; 16.61%			
Calgary-North	Rose Wilkinson; 6,655; 51.68%	James David Macdonald; 3,385; 26.29%	Grant MacEwan; 2,429; 18.86%	Aylmer John Eggert Liesemer; 374; 2.90%		
Calgary-North East	Albert W. Ludwig; 5,945; 64.02%	Melvin P. Stronach; 1,829; 19.70%	E. Kitch Elton; 1,060; 11.42%	Jack Hampson; 420; 4.52%		
Calgary-South East	Arthur J. Dixon; 5,643; 66.69%	Ernest Henry Starr; 1,537; 18.16%	Peter Petrasuk; 792; 9.36%	George E. Ellinson; 437; 5.16%		
Calgary-West	Donald S. Fleming; 5,060; 49.99%	Roy Victor Deyell; 3,392; 33.51%	Ted Duncan; 1,397; 13.80%	Ken Tory; 242; 2.39%		
Camrose	Chester I. Sayers; 3,229; 53.12%	John E. Stuart; 1,638; 26.95%	Stanley Ross Gould; 732; 12.04%	Archie Olstad; 468; 7.70%		
Cardston	Edgar W. Hinman; 2,205; 73.43%	John A. Spencer; 791; 26.34%				Edgar W. Hinman
Clover Bar	Floyd M. Baker; 3,393; 57.78%	Andrew M. Adamson; 1,225; 20.86%	Roy C. Marler; 935; 15.92%	Ernest Wilfred Davies; 310; 5.28%		
Cypress	Harry E. Strom; 3,199; 79.09%	Wayne N. Anderson; 831; 20.54%				Harry E. Strom
Didsbury	James Lawrence Owens; 3,042; 61.38%	Douglas N. Munn; 1,350; 27.24%	Walter P. Hourihan; 556; 11.22%			James Lawrence Owens
Drumheller	Gordon Edward Taylor; 3,922; 83.84%	Eneas A. Toshach; 740; 15.82%				Gordon Edward Taylor
Dunvegan	Joseph M. Scruggs; 1,080; 38.72%	Bennidict V. Griep; 661; 23.70%	Steven P. Tachit; 648; 23.23%	Floyd A. Johnson; 383; 13.73%		
Edmonton North	Ethel Sylvia Wilson; 4,831; 52.92%	John Verchomin; 3,356; 36.76%		Peter Gomuwka; 881; 9.65%		
Edmonton-Centre	Ambrose Holowach; 3,912; 46.53%	Gerard Joseph Amerongen; 2,185; 25.99%	Laurette C. Douglas; 1,684; 20.03%	Robert Atkin; 589; 7.01%		
Edmonton-North East	Lou W. Heard; 4,960; 49.52%	Allan Welsh; 2,389; 23.85%	Louis Marchand; 1,325; 13.23%	Alex Goruk; 1,063; 10.61%	William Harasym (Lab-Pro); 218; 2.18%	
Edmonton-North West	Edgar H. Gerhart; 4,823; 42.63%	Ned Feehan; 3,249; 28.72%	Harper McCrae; 2,071; 18.31%	James (Jim) Forest; 1,146; 10.13%		
Edmonton-Norwood	William Tomyn; 5,071; 54.49%	Nestor Marchyshyn; 1,482; 15.93%	P.W. Bill Jones; 1,522; 16.36%	Frank G. McCoy; 932; 10.02%	William A. Tuomi (Lab-Pro); 251; 2.70%	
Edson	Norman Alfred Willmore; 3,074; 56.84%	Chris. H.R. Nielsen; 1,678; 31.03%	Melvyn A. Parkyn; 634; 11.72%			Norman Alfred Willmore
Gleichen	George E. Bell; 2,267; 59.94%	A. John Van Wezel; 754; 19.94%	Carman W. Ellis; 752; 19.88%			George E. Bell
Grande Prairie	Ira McLaughlin; 4,213; 65.43%	David T. Williamson; 1,391; 21.60%	Mac Perkins; 816; 12.67%			Ira McLaughlin
Grouard	Roy Ells; 3,727; 57.01%	Paul Soulodre; 1,309; 20.02%	Paul E. Maisonneuve; 1,476; 22.58%			
Hand Hills	Clinton Keith French; 3,052; 65.99%	William J. Newman; 1,074; 23.22%	Val Gobel; 489; 10.57%			Wallace Warren Cross
Jasper West	Richard H. Jamieson; 5,047; 40.65%	John Percy Page; 4,507; 36.30%	Abe William Miller; 2,782; 22.41%			
Lac La Biche	Elvin J. Woynarowich; 1,518; 41.27%	Henry T. Thompson; 411; 11.17%	Michael Maccagno; 1,734; 47.15%			Michael Maccagno
Lac Ste. Anne	William Patterson; 2,286; 46.53%	L.D. Gould; 1,129; 22.98%	John A. Mills; 907; 18.46%	Charley Keeley; 582; 11.85%		
Lacombe	Allan Russell Patrick; 3,089; 63.42%	Denis R. Stafford; 1,162; 23.86%		Robert H. Carlyle; 620; 12.73%		Allan Russell Patrick
Leduc		Peter Wyllie; 1,494; 33.11%		Andrew Simon Borys; 676; 14.98%	Ronald Earl Ansley (Ind. SoCred); 2,334; 51.73%	
Lethbridge	John C. Landeryou; 7,250; 61.77%	Thomas Spanos; 2,917; 24.85%	Robery Henry Jeacock; 1,525; 12.99%			John C. Landeryou
Little Bow	Peter Dawson; 2,939; 64.71%	Bernard W. Tonken; 989; 21.77%	Donald A. McNiven; 603; 13.28%			Peter Dawson
Macleod	James Hartley; 3,731; 72.12%	Leo E. Toone; 949; 18.35%	Dennis Arthur Mouser; 475; 9.18%			James Hartley
Medicine Hat	Elizabeth G. Robinson; 5,604; 64.87%	John H. Cocks; 1,780; 20.60%	Norma DeMan; 597; 6.91%	John D. Rogers; 495; 5.73%		Elizabeth G. Robinson
Okotoks-High River	Ernest G. Hansell; 2,642; 51.42%	James S. McLeod; 1,069; 20.81%			Ross Laird Ellis (Ind.); 1,427; 27.77%	Ross Laird Ellis
Olds	Roderick Angus Macleod; 3,424; 66.29%	Bruce Hanson; 1,728; 33.46%				Roderick Angus Macleod
Peace River	William F. Gilliland; 2,864; 60.64%	Harold C. Sissons; 1,190; 25.20%	James Mann; 650; 13.76%			William F. Gilliland
Pembina	Robin D. Jorgenson; 3,436; 61.50%	Frie Bredo; 1,708; 30.57%	Gustav Wahl; 416; 7.45%			Robin D. Jorgenson
Pincher Creek-Crowsnest	William A. Kovach; 3,145; 66.89%	Alex Grant; 1,133; 24.10%	C. Boyden; 410; 8.72%			William A. Kovach
Ponoka	Glen F. Johnston; 2,406; 49.88%	Ivor E. Davies; 1,529; 31.70%	Erwin E. Schultz; 860; 17.83%			
Red Deer	William Kenneth Ure; 6,691; 63.61%	William J. Cameron "Cam" Kirby; 3,797; 36.10%				
Redwater	John Dubetz; 2,092; 49.05%	Martha P. Bielish; 901; 21.13%	Alfred Macyk; 1,262; 29.59%			
Rocky Mountain House	Alfred J. Hooke; 3,235; 74.45%		Tom Bert; 660; 15.19%	Raymond E. Schmidt; 437; 10.06%		Alfred J. Hooke
Sedgewick	Jack C. Hillman; 2,805; 62.75%	Kenneth M. Geddes; 796; 17.81%	Mildred G. Redman; 541; 12.10%	Arthur C. Bunney; 319; 7.14%		Jack C. Hillman
Spirit River	Adolph O. Fimrite; 3,010; 63.68%	Charles J. Stojan; 1,059; 22.40%		James W. Graham; 593; 12.54%	C.J. Lampert (Ind. SoCred); 58; 1.23%	Adolph O. Fimrite
St. Albert	Keith Everitt; 2,157; 36.28%	Stanley M. Walker; 1,187; 19.96%	Arthur J. Soetaert; 2,082; 35.02%	Earl Toane; 473; 7.95%		
St. Paul	Raymond Reierson; 3,412; 68.38%	Gordon Shave; 534; 10.70%	J. Van Brabant; 1,034; 20.72%			Raymond Reierson
Stettler	Galen C. Norris; 3,150; 60.71%	Gordon Taylor; 991; 19.10%	Henry Kroeger; 721; 13.89%	Alice Ness; 297; 5.72%		Galen C. Norris
Stony Plain	Cornelia R. Wood; 2,880; 46.25%	Robert K. Clarkson; 1,227; 19.70%	John Harold McLaughlin; 2,091; 33.58%			John Harold McLaughlin
Strathcona Centre	Joseph Donovan Ross; 4,564; 53.81%	Pat Walsh; 2,226; 26.25%	Leslie M. Lyons; 1,215; 14.33%	Keith Wright; 422; 4.98%		
Strathcona East	Ernest C. Manning; 7,337; 49.62%	James E. Simpson; 3,812; 25.78%	George Johnson; 2,610; 17.65%	Hugh Smith; 999; 6.76%		
Strathcona West	Randolph H. McKinnon; 3,639; 41.63%	Eric M. Duggan; 2,683; 30.69%	Frank J. Edwards; 1,982; 22.67%	H. Douglas Trace; 423; 4.84%		
Taber	Roy S. Lee; 3,678; 77.64%	Leslie P. Cluff; 1,037; 21.89%				Roy S. Lee
Vegreville	Alex W. Gordey; 2,248; 47.63%	Joseph M. Melnychuk; 531; 11.25%	John Koshuta; 676; 14.32%	Stanley N. Ruzycki; 1,253; 26.55%		
Vermilion	Ashley H. Cooper; 2,204; 49.35%	D.J. Frunchak; 799; 17.89%	Russell James Whitson; 1,224; 27.41%		John P. Hocaluk (Lab-Pro); 227; 5.08%	
Wainwright	Henry A. Ruste; 3,111; 64.76%	Donald Mills; 831; 17.30%	Henry D. Frizzell; 572; 11.91%	John Wesley Connelly; 274; 5.70%		Henry A. Ruste
Warner	Leonard C. Halmrast; 2,430; 72.52%		Mark R. Stringam; 915; 27.31%			Leonard C. Halmrast
Wetaskiwin	John A. Wingblade; 3,352; 58.12%	Robert D. Angus; 1,010; 17.51%	Fred R. MacNaughton; 642; 11.13%	David Pat. Garland; 749; 12.99%		
Willingdon	Nicholas A. Melnyk; 2,421; 63.13%	Alex Hushlak; 991; 25.84%		Nick W. Svekla; 392; 10.22%		

== See also ==
- List of Alberta political parties
