= Vegreville-Bruce =

Defunct provincial electoral district in Alberta, Canada

Alberta electoral district

Defunct provincial electoral district
- Legislature: Legislative Assembly of Alberta
- District created: 1963
- District abolished: 1971
- First contested: 1963
- Last contested: 1967

Vegreville-Bruce was a provincial electoral district in Alberta, Canada, mandated to return a single member to the Legislative Assembly of Alberta using the first past the post method of voting from 1963 to 1971.

== History ==
Vegreville-Bruce is named for the town of Vegreville, Alberta and the Hamlet of Bruce, Alberta.

Vegreville-Bruce was formed from Vegreville and Bruce electoral districts prior to the 1963 Alberta general election. Vegreville-Bruce would be abolished prior to the 1971 Alberta general election, returning to the Vegreville electoral district.

=== Members of the Legislative Assembly (MLAs) ===
Members of the Legislative Assembly for Vegreville-Bruce
Assembly	Years	Member	Party
See Vegreville electoral district from 1909-1963 and Bruce electoral district from 1940-1963
15th	1963–1967	Alex W. Gordey	Social Credit
16th	1967–1971	Alex W. Gordey	Social Credit
See Vegreville electoral district from 1971-1993

== Electoral history ==
=== 1963 ===
1963 Alberta general election
Party	Candidate	Votes	%	±%
Social Credit	Alex W. Gordey	2,925	50.14%	–
Progressive Conservative	Granham Allan	1,194	20.47%	–
New Democratic	Albin Lukawiecki	851	14.59%	–
Liberal	Wilfrid L. Horton	675	11.57%	–
Independent Social Credit	Clarence A. Knies	189	3.24%	–
Total		5,834	–	–
Rejected, spoiled and declined		12	–	–
Eligible electors / turnout		9,153	63.87%	–
Social Credit pickup new district.				
Source(s) Source: "Vegreville-Bruce Official Results 1963 Alberta general election". Alberta Heritage Community Foundation.

=== 1967 ===
1967 Alberta general election
Party	Candidate	Votes	%	±%
Social Credit	Alex W. Gordey	2497	44.64%	-5.50%
Progressive Conservative	Mike W. Kawulych	1,742	31.14%	10.67%
New Democratic	Albin Lukawiecki	1,010	18.06%	3.47%
Liberal	Wilfred Horton	345	6.17%	-5.40%
Total		5,594	–	–
Rejected, spoiled and declined		29	–	–
Eligible electors / turnout		8,846	63.57%	–
Social Credit hold		Swing		-8.09%
Source(s) Source: "Vegreville-Bruce Official Results 1967 Alberta general election". Alberta Heritage Community Foundation.

== See also ==
- List of Alberta provincial electoral districts
- Canadian provincial electoral districts
