= Ed Stelmach =

Premier of Alberta from 2006 to 2011

The Honourable Ed Stelmach ECA AOE
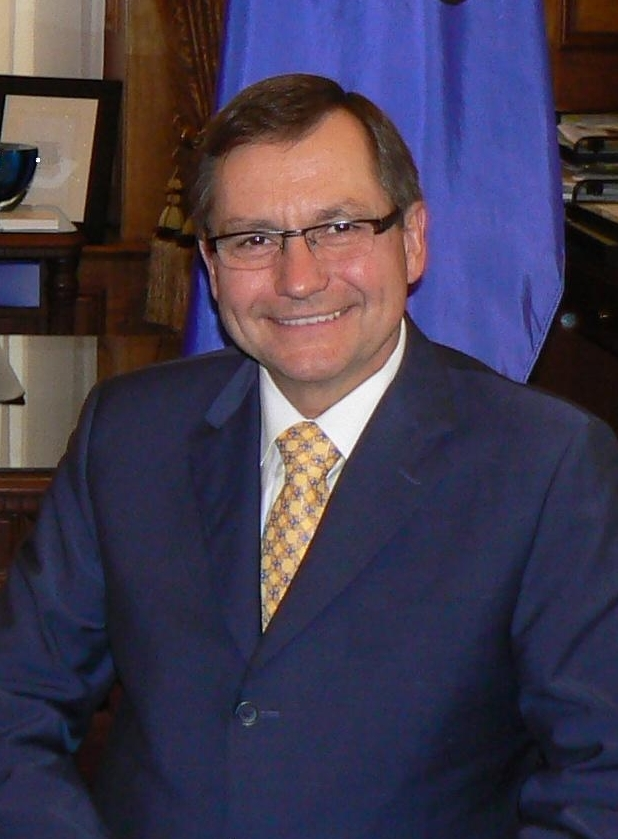
- Stelmach in 2006

13th Premier of Alberta
- In office December 14, 2006 – October 7, 2011
- Monarch: Elizabeth II
- Lieutenant Governor: Norman Kwong; Donald Ethell
- Deputy: Ron Stevens; Doug Horner
- Preceded by: Ralph Klein
- Succeeded by: Alison Redford

Leader of the Progressive Conservative Association of Alberta
- In office December 3, 2006 – October 1, 2011
- Preceded by: Ralph Klein
- Succeeded by: Alison Redford
Alberta Executive Council
Minister of Intergovernmental Relations
In office November 25, 2004 – March 23, 2006
Premier	Ralph Klein
Preceded by	Halvar Jonson
Succeeded by	Gary Mar
Minister of Transportation
In office March 16, 2001 – November 25, 2004
Premier	Ralph Klein
Preceded by	Himself (as Minister of Infrastructure)
Succeeded by	Lyle Oberg (Infrastructure and Transportation)
Minister of Infrastructure
In office May 26, 1999 – March 16, 2001
Premier	Ralph Klein
Preceded by	Position established
Succeeded by	Ty Lund
Minister of Agriculture, Food, and Rural Development
In office March 29, 1997 – May 26, 1999
Premier	Ralph Klein
Preceded by	Walter Paszkowski
Succeeded by	Ty Lund
Parliamentary constituencies
Member of the Legislative Assembly of Alberta for Fort Saskatchewan-Vegreville (Vegreville-Viking; 1993–2004)
In office June 15, 1993 – April 23, 2012
Preceded by	Riding established
Succeeded by	Jacquie Fenske

Personal details
- Born: Edward Michael Stelmach; May 11, 1951 (age 75) Lamont, Alberta, Canada
- Party: Progressive Conservative
- Spouse: Marie Warshawski (m. 1973)
- Children: 4
- Education: University of Alberta (attended)
- Occupation: Politician; farmer; businessman

Edward Michael Stelmach ECA AOE (/ˈstɛlmæk/; born May 11, 1951) is a Canadian politician who served as the 13th premier of Alberta, from 2006 to 2011. The grandson of Ukrainian immigrants, Stelmach was born and raised on a farm near Lamont and fluently speaks the distinctive Canadian dialect of Ukrainian. He spent his entire pre-political adult life as a farmer, except for some time spent studying at the University of Alberta. His first foray into politics was a 1986 municipal election, when he was elected to Lamont County council. A year into his term, he was appointed reeve. He continued in this position until his entry into provincial politics.

In the 1993 provincial election, Stelmach was elected as the Member of the Legislative Assembly (MLA) for Vegreville-Viking (later Fort Saskatchewan-Vegreville). A Progressive Conservative, he served in the cabinets of Ralph Klein—at various times holding the portfolios of Intergovernmental Relations, Transportation, Infrastructure, and Agriculture, Food, and Rural Development—where he developed a reputation as a low-key politician who avoided the limelight. When Klein resigned the party's leadership in 2006, Stelmach was among the first to present his candidature to replace him. After a third-place finish on the first ballot of the leadership race, he won an upset second ballot victory over former provincial treasurer Jim Dinning.

Stelmach's premiership was heavily focused on management of the province's oil reserves, especially those of the Athabasca Oil Sands. He rejected calls from environmentalists to slow the pace of development in the Fort McMurray area, and similarly opposed calls for carbon taxes. Other policy initiatives included commencing an overhaul of the province's health governance system, amendments to the Alberta human rights code, a re-introduction of all-party committees to the Legislature, and the conclusion of a major labour agreement with Alberta's teachers. His government also attracted controversy for awarding itself a 30% pay increase shortly after its re-election, and featured strained relations with Calgary, one of Klein's former strongholds. Despite this, Stelmach increased the Progressive Conservatives' already substantial majority in the 2008 election. With the advent of the late-2000s recession, Stelmach had to cope with a deteriorating economic situation and the Alberta government's first budget deficit in 16 years.

Stelmach was succeeded as Premier by Alison Redford on October 7, 2011. He joined the board of Covenant Health a year later, and has been its chair since January 2016.

== Background ==
Edward Michael Stelmach was born on a farm near Lamont, Alberta, the grandson of immigrants from Zavyche, Ukraine. His grandparents settled near Andrew, Alberta in 1898, after bypassing Saskatchewan because they did not care for the terrain. His parents, Nancy (née Koroluk) and Michael N. Stelmach, had five children, of whom Edward was the youngest, ten years younger than his closest sibling. Stelmach was raised speaking Ukrainian, and did not learn English until he started attending school. He was raised a Ukrainian Catholic, and continues to attend church regularly, sing in the church choir, and act as a volunteer caretaker for the cemetery. Through high school, he worked as a well-digger and a Fuller Brush salesman, where he said his grasp of Ukrainian helped him make sales. After graduating high school—his grade 12 yearbook called him a future Prime Minister of Canada—he attended the University of Alberta, intending to become a lawyer. He continued there, working as an assistant manager at Woodward's, until 1973, when his oldest brother, Victor, died. While his family had intended for Victor to take over the farm that his grandparents had settled 75 years before, Stelmach dropped out of university, returned home, and bought the land from his parents. He continues to farm the land today.

As a teenager, he met Marie Warshawski at the wedding of a mutual friend. They married in 1973, and have three sons and a daughter.

Stelmach entered politics in 1986 with his election to the council of Lamont County; one year later, he was appointed county reeve, a position he held until his entry into provincial politics in 1993.

== MLA and minister ==
Stelmach ran for the Legislative Assembly of Alberta as a Progressive Conservative in the 1993 provincial election, defeating incumbent New Democrat Derek Fox in the riding of Vegreville-Viking. Stelmach became a member of the Deep Six, a group of enthusiastically fiscally conservative rookie MLAs; in addition to supporting Premier Ralph Klein's aggressive deficit-cutting, Stelmach practiced fiscal restraint himself, incurring low office expenses and declining a government vehicle. During his first term, Stelmach served as Deputy Whip and, later, Chief Government Whip for the P.C. caucus. As a backbencher, he sponsored the Lloydminster Hospital Act Repeal Act. This was a government bill that dissolved the then-existing Lloydminster hospital board in preparation for an arrangement compliant with both the Alberta government's new system of regional health authorities and the Saskatchewan government's system. Lloydminster sits on the border of Alberta and Saskatchewan, and the hospital, although built and operated by the Alberta government, sits on the Saskatchewan side. It passed the legislature with little debate. In 1996, shortly before an April by-election in Redwater, Stelmach was accused of "pork barrel politics" for presenting, along with colleague Peter Trynchy and P.C. candidate Ross Quinn, a large cheque to a local seniors centre. Stelmach said that he had only stepped in to help the riding after its MLA, Nicholas Taylor, had been appointed to the Senate.

After the 1997 provincial election, Klein appointed Stelmach Minister of Agriculture, Food, and Rural development. While he held this office, his department encouraged the establishment of feedlots. The opposition parties charged that the government was not regulating these sufficiently, but Stelmach responded that municipalities had the authority necessary to effectively regulate them. On the Canadian Wheat Board controversy, Stelmach sided with farmers who wanted an end to the federal body's monopoly on grain sales in the western provinces. Legislatively, Stelmach sponsored five bills while in the Agriculture, Food, and Rural Development portfolio, all of which passed through the legislature. 1997's Meat Inspection Amendment Act required meat inspectors to acquire a search warrant before entering a private dwelling, but also allowed for fines to be voluntarily paid without requiring a court case. It was called by Liberal agriculture critic Ken Nicol "a really good bill". The Livestock and Livestock Products Amendment Act of the same year eliminated government guarantee of the Livestock Patrons' Assurance Fund, designed to protect cattle producers from payment defaults by livestock dealers, in favour of leaving the Fund entirely in the hands of the industry. It too was supported by the Liberals, with Nicol calling it "very easy for us to accept". In 1998, Stelmach sponsored the Agriculture Statutes (Penalties) Amendment Act, which overhauled the penalty system for violation of various agricultural statutes, setting maximum fines and leaving the precise amount up to judges on a case-by-case basis. It also passed with Liberal support, as MLA Ed Gibbons said that it "really makes a lot of sense". Another 1998 bill was the Marketing of Agricultural Products Amendment Act, which allowed provincial agricultural marketing boards to revise their marketing plans, and was supported by the opposition. Finally, Stelmach initiated the Agriculture Statutes (Livestock Identification) Amendment Act, which allowed the government to delegate the inspection of branding to the cattle industry. The bill was the subject of considerable debate on second reading, but was ultimately supported by the Liberals on the third and final reading.

In 1999, Klein shifted Stelmach to the new Infrastructure portfolio, where he made traffic safety a priority, increasing fines for traffic offenses, sometimes by as much as 700%. He also briefly aroused controversy by proposing reversing the slow and fast lanes on provincial highways, on the grounds that this would equalize the rate at which the lanes broke down and therefore save on maintenance costs; nothing came of the proposal. He established a fund for capital projects, but was criticized for not doing enough to address the deterioration of the province's infrastructure. In 2001, Klein separated Transportation out of the Infrastructure portfolio and appointed Stelmach to it, where the new minister advocated the use of public-private partnerships to build ring roads around Edmonton and Calgary. He also introduced a program of graduated driver licensing and initiated a review of traffic safety programs. Stelmach was re-elected by his largest majority yet during the 2001 election, and retained the Transportation portfolio until 2004, when he was reassigned to the position of Minister of Intergovernmental Relations. He resigned this position in 2006 in order to contest the P.C. leadership election (Klein had required that ministers intending to campaign to succeed him resign from cabinet).

As minister, Stelmach kept a low profile. Mark Lisac, who was the Edmonton Journal's provincial affairs columnist during much of Stelmach's time in cabinet, later recalled that Stelmach "never did anything that was flashy or controversial in any way" and that "not a thing" stood out about Stelmach's ministerial service. This low-key style earned Stelmach the moniker "Steady Eddie", which would follow him to the Premier's office.

== 2006 leadership election ==
Stelmach was the first candidate to declare his intention to run for the P.C. leadership, and picked up endorsements from nineteen members of his caucus (including cabinet ministers Pearl Calahasen and Iris Evans). However, former provincial Treasurer Jim Dinning had twice as many caucus endorsements (despite not having held elected office since 1997) and was generally considered the race's front-runner. Stelmach ran a low-profile campaign, touring the province in a custom-painted campaign bus, while most media attention was focussed on the rivalry between Dinning and the socially conservative Ted Morton.

According to the race's rules, the three candidates receiving the most votes on the first ballot would move on to a second ballot, which would use a preferential voting system to select a winner. Stelmach finished third on the first ballot with 15.3% of the vote, 3,329 votes ahead of fourth place Lyle Oberg and 10,647 votes behind second place Morton. However, the fourth, fifth, and sixth place candidates (Oberg, Dave Hancock, and Mark Norris) all endorsed Stelmach for the second ballot. On this ballot, he finished in first place on the first count, fewer than five hundred votes ahead of Dinning. A majority of Morton's votes went to Stelmach on the second count, and he was elected leader.

=== Financing ===
Stelmach raised more than $1.1 million for his leadership campaign. After his victory, he revealed the names of the donors of 85% of this money, but declined to release the names of eighty supporters, citing their requests for privacy. These supporters had donated a total of more than $160,000. Party rules did not require any disclosure, and the disclosures by candidates varied—Norris named all of his donors, while Morton did not reveal any. Stelmach's partial disclosure was deemed insufficient by opposition leaders and Democracy Watch, whose head suggested that Albertans should assume that Stelmach's anonymous donors placed him in a conflict of interest until he proved otherwise. Stelmach also acknowledged receiving a $10,000 donation from the Beaver Regional Waste Management Service's Commission, a landfill operator owned by five municipalities in Stelmach's riding. While asserting that the donation was legal, Stelmach admitted that it was "clearly unethical", blamed overzealous campaign volunteers for soliciting it, and returned it after the end of the campaign.

In the wake of the leadership campaign, Stelmach, along with Oberg, Hancock, and Norris, organized two $5,000 per plate dinners in January 2007 to pay campaign debts. After critics argued that the dinners were essentially selling access to the premier and two senior ministers, Stelmach cancelled them.

== Premier ==
=== 2008 election ===
Stelmach was sworn in as Premier December 14, 2006. On February 4, 2008, immediately after Lieutenant Governor Norman Kwong read the throne speech to open the legislative session, Stelmach requested a dissolution of the legislature with an election to follow March 3. Shortly before the writ was dropped, a group calling itself Albertans for Change began to buy print and television ads that attacked Stelmach for lacking a plan and portrayed him as unfit to lead the province. The group was funded by the Alberta Building Trades Council and the Alberta Federation of Labour, which led to a series of ads purchased by the National Citizens Coalition and Merit Contractors, in which it was accused of "putting your [union members'] money where [union leadership's] mouths are."

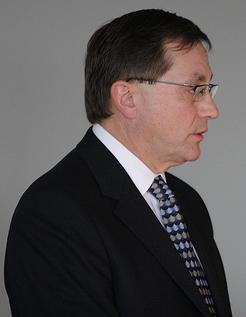
Stelmach speaking at a luncheon in April 2007

Despite a campaign that was called disorganized and uninspired, Stelmach's Progressive Conservatives won 72 seats in the 83-seat Legislative Assembly, an increase from the 62 that the party had won in the previous election and only two seats short of Ralph Klein's 2001 landslide. Political analysts attributed the party's win to its ability to present Stelmach as "a cautious, straightforward and hard-working man with a plan for Alberta's future".

The voter turnout in the election was 41%, the lowest in Alberta's history, and roughly a quarter of these had to swear an oath on election day after discovering they weren't on the voter's list. Opposition politicians and media blamed Stelmach's government for these problems, arguing that riding-level returning officers, who were nominated by Progressive Conservative constituency associations and who were responsible for voter enumeration, were not appointed early enough. According to the Canadian Broadcasting Corporation, "about half" of the 83 returning officers in the 2008 election had ties to the P.C. Party; the returning officer in Stelmach's Fort Saskatchewan–Vegreville riding had donated between $500 and $1,000 to Stelmach's leadership campaign.

Alberta Chief Returning Officer Lorne Gibson, as one of his 182 post-election recommendations to the government, suggested that the appointment of returning officers be handled by his own, non-partisan, office. He had previously made this suggestion in 2006, but the government had not acted on it. He also recommended following the election that his office, rather than the government's Justice department, be responsible for prosecuting election-related offenses; the latter did not lay charges in any of 19 alleged campaign finance violations Gibson brought to its attention. In February 2009, Gibson appeared before the legislature's all-party committee on legislative offices to answer questions about the conduct of the election; there, he echoed opposition claims that the government, and not his office, was to blame for most problems. Shortly after, the committee voted 8–3 against re-appointing him, with all Progressive Conservatives on the committee opposing his re-appointment and all opposition MLAs supporting it. Opposition leaders David Swann and Brian Mason suggested that Gibson was being punished for criticizing the government.

=== Energy and environmental policy ===
Much of Stelmach's term as Premier was dominated by questions related to the Athabasca Oil Sands. The rapid development of these reserves was fuelling the Alberta economy's strong growth, but also raised environmental questions. After winning the Premiership, Stelmach emphasized that he had no intention of taking measures that would slow down oilsands development and suggested that the economy would find its own appropriate growth rate. He aggressively defended Alberta's oil at home and abroad, and called the idea that it was extracted at an unacceptably high environmental cost "a myth". When Liberal Party of Canada leader Stéphane Dion proposed a federal carbon tax to reduce emissions of greenhouse gases, Stelmach rejected the policy on the basis that it would hurt the economy and would unfairly penalize the western provinces. Instead, he championed the development of carbon capture technology. In July 2008, Stelmach announced $2 billion worth of funding for carbon capture initiatives, for which he was applauded by industry groups. However, the Canadian Federation of Independent Business called it "a huge amount of money to spend on something that isn't proven", and Mike Hudema of Greenpeace suggesting that there were better environmental uses of the money available.

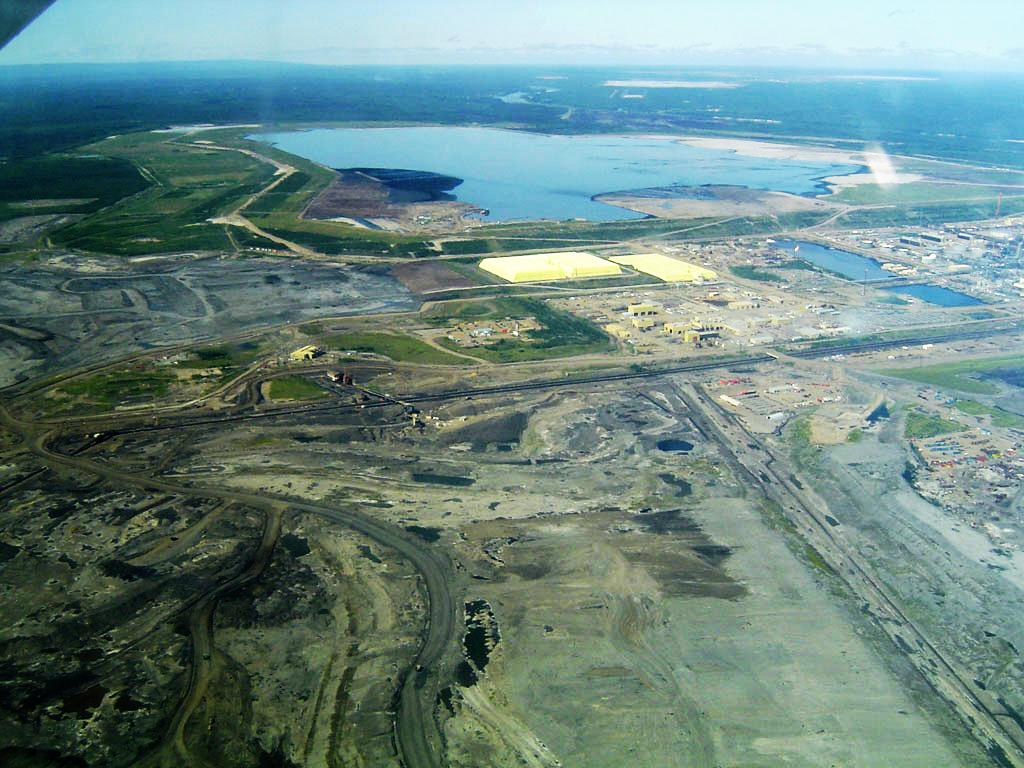
Stelmach has been a proponent of development of the oil sands.

Though Stelmach pledged not to do anything to curb the development of the oilsands, he did promise to review royalty rates—the rates paid by oil companies for the privilege of extracting Alberta's oil. He also committed to reducing the proportion of bitumen that left Alberta to be upgraded out of province, likening the export of bitumen to "scraping off the top soil" from farmland. Soon after becoming Premier, he commissioned the Alberta Royalty Review panel to make recommendations on the province's royalty regime; opposition politicians had accused the government of undercharging substantially. Stelmach rejected many of the panel's recommendations, and claimed to increase royalty rates by approximately 20% (25% less than recommended by the panel), however instead of an increase in royalties on oil and gas, Alberta collected $13.5 billion less from 2009 to 2014. Just after the 2008 election, Stelmach's government announced a five-year royalty break worth $237 million per year to encourage development that it feared would have become uneconomical under the new plan. He was less decisive in increasing in-province bitumen upgrading; in 2008 he conceded that Alberta would continue upgrading between sixty and sixty-five percent of the bitumen it produced for the foreseeable future, rather than the seventy-two percent target he had previously announced for 2016. This admission came in the wake of his government's approval of three new pipelines designed to export bitumen.

In January 2008, Stelmach unveiled the province's "made in Alberta"—as distinct from imposed by the federal government or by international treaty—plan to cut carbon emissions in order to fight global warming. The plan called for reducing greenhouse gas emissions by 14% (from 2007 levels) by 2050. Environmental groups and opposition parties suggested that this was insufficient in light of British Columbia's plan to cut emissions by 80% (from 2007 levels) during the same period, but Stelmach argued that Alberta's position as a supplier of oil to the rest of the country justified higher emissions. This was followed in June by the unveiling of the government's campaign to ask Albertans to make "one simple act"—such as composting, using reusable shopping bags, and replacing incandescent light bulbs with the more efficient fluorescent bulbs. Opponents argued that the emphasis on personal responsibility by individuals did nothing to address the greater environmental damage caused by the development of the Athabasca Oil Sands.

In late April 2008 hundreds of ducks landed in a northern Alberta tailings pond belonging to Syncrude, where most died. The incident was a blow to Stelmach's efforts to convince the world that Alberta's oil sands were environmentally friendly. The number of ducks that died was originally reported at around 500, but in March 2009 Syncrude revealed that the number was in fact more than 1,600. In response to accusations from opposition and environmental groups that his government, which had known the actual number since the summer of 2008, had participated in covering it up to save face, Stelmach asserted that it had refrained from making the higher number public for fear of jeopardizing its investigation of whether Syncrude had violated any provincial regulations in the incident. Investigations were centred around the questions of whether Syncrude had immediately reported the incident as required (the government had first heard of it from an anonymous tip, though Syncrude reported it several hours later) and whether the company had the required measures in place to prevent ducks from landing on its tailings ponds (it had noisemakers designed to deter waterfowl, but these had not been set up at the time of the incident due to winter weather conditions). Syncrude was eventually charged with "failing to have systems in place to divert waterfowl", which carries a maximum fine of $800,000.

Partially in an effort to counter-act negative publicity from oil sands-related issues—for example, the March 2009 edition of National Geographic Magazine contained a 20-page article portraying Alberta's oil sands operations as being highly environmentally damaging—in 2009 Stelmach's government spent $25 million on a rebranding campaign for the province. Among other things, it replaced the "Alberta Advantage" slogan that had long been in use with "Alberta: Freedom to create. Spirit to achieve." The campaign became the subject of some ridicule when the Edmonton Journal revealed that one of the photos used in it was not taken in Alberta, but at a North Sea beach in Northumberland. While the government initially claimed that it had intentionally used a foreign image to represent Alberta's engagement with the world, it later admitted that this was not the case, and that the photo had been used in error. Stelmach responded to the image, which showed two children running along a beach, by saying that "children, no matter where they are around the world, they are the next generation. And air quality, water quality, no matter where we live on this big globe, we're all responsible, and that's the message we're trying to portray."

=== Energy and Utilities Board affair and land use policy ===
In June 2007, the government-mandated Alberta Energy and Utilities Board admitted that it had hired private investigators to spy on landowners who opposed the construction of a major power line in the Rimbey area. Stelmach initially downplayed the incident, but ordered a judicial investigation once the province's Information and Privacy Commissioner initiated an investigation of his own. This investigation found that the EUB had violated provincial law and infringed on the landowners' privacy, while the judicial investigation criticized the EUB's tactics as "repulsive". The opposition parties called for the dismissal of the entire EUB and Energy Minister Mel Knight; Stelmach instead opted to appoint a new EUB chair.

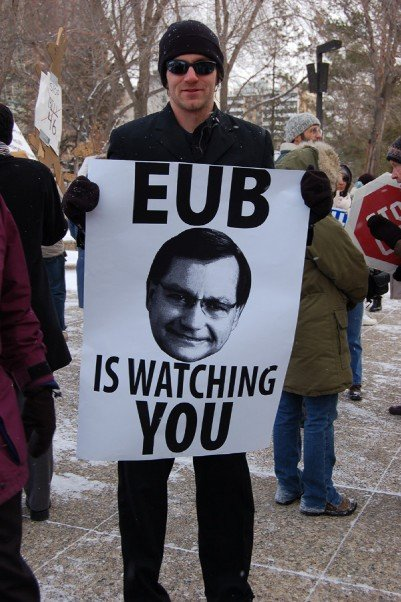
Activist Mike Hudema holding a depiction of Stelmach while protesting Bill 46.

Stelmach's government also responded with legislation entitled the Alberta Utilities Commission Act (Bill 46), which would split the EUB into two parts: the Alberta Utilities Commission (responsible for regulating utilities) and the Energy Resources Conservation Board (responsible for regulating oil and gas). The legislation was controversial, as elements of the EUB's governing legislation that provided for public notice and consultation in the event of energy construction projects were left out. Opposition parties and advocacy groups charged that this was an assault on both landowners' rights and the environment. The legislation ultimately passed, and took effect at the beginning of 2008.

Stelmach clashed with rural landowners again in 2009 when his government introduced the Land Assembly Project Area Act, designed to make it easier for the government to acquire large blocks of land for public purposes such as ring roads or reservoirs. The act allowed the government to identify land that it may be interested in expropriating at some point in the future and to indefinitely prohibit any development on that land that could conflict with the government's purposes. Despite vigorous opposition from landowners and the opposition parties, the bill passed the legislature in late April.

=== Fiscal policy ===
Ralph Klein's major focus for much of his premiership had been the elimination of the provincial deficit, and the government ran a record $8.9 billion surplus during Stelmach's first year in office. Alberta was in the midst of a major economic expansion driven by high energy prices and major oilsands development. This growth continued into 2007–2008, when the government's surplus was $4.6 billion. Both of these surpluses were higher than expected, and Stelmach's government followed a policy of placing one third of unanticipated surpluses into savings and two-thirds into construction projects. Critics, including Liberal MLA Laurie Blakeman and the Canadian Taxpayers Federation, charged that the government was not saving enough money in anticipation of a fall in energy prices.

In her April 2008 budget, Stelmach's Finance Minister Iris Evans forecast a $1.6 billion surplus for 2008–2009. By August, she had revised this prediction to $8.5 billion. The major reason for this change is an increase in oil prices: while she had estimated in April that they would average $78 per barrel over the fiscal year, by August increases—including a high of $147 per barrel in July—have led her to make a new estimate of a $119.25 per barrel average. By November, prices had fallen to $55 per barrel, and Evans estimated a $2 billion surplus. By February 2009, the government of Alberta appeared poised to run a $1 billion deficit. In April 2009, Evans released her budget for 2009–2010, in which she anticipated a $4.6 billion deficit. This is the largest deficit in Alberta's history, and its first in sixteen years. The government's fiscal plan includes deficits until 2012–2013, when it again anticipates a surplus.

Stelmach's approach to this deteriorating fiscal situation, part of a global recession, was to invest heavily in infrastructure in an effort to stimulate the economy and take advantage of low construction costs. He went as far as to advocate borrowing for capital construction, a departure from the Klein government's notoriously anti-debt approach. However, his government was also one of only two in Canada (the other being Saskatchewan's) to cut overall spending in the 2009–2010 budget. This approach drew the ire of Liberal leader David Swann, who supported increased government spending for economic stimulus purposes, but drew support from some economists and was defended by Evans on the basis that capital spending was at twice the per capital level of the Canadian average.

=== Teachers pension liability ===
During his first year in office, Stelmach and his education minister Ron Liepert concluded a deal with the Alberta Teachers Association (ATA) in which the province agreed to contribute $2.1 billion towards the $6.6 billion unfunded pension liability. This liability resulted from insufficient contributions to the teachers' pension plan during the period leading up to 1992. In exchange, the ATA agreed to a five-year contract extension. The deal was applauded by the opposition Liberals and New Democrats, but was criticized by the Canadian Taxpayers Federation, which called for a plebiscite on the issue.

=== Pay increases ===
Shortly after winning an increased majority in the 2008 election, Stelmach's cabinet approved substantial raises for themselves, increasing the salary paid to cabinet ministers from $142,000 to $184,000 and that paid to the Premier from $159,450 to $213,450. The increases also affect the severance paid to ministers who resign or are defeated in elections—under the program implemented by Ralph Klein's government to replace the previously existing pension program, departing MLAs receive three months' pay for every year they served, with the level of the pay based on their three highest-earning years. The increases were attacked by the Canadian Taxpayers Federation and the opposition parties, but Stelmach defended the raises as the first received by cabinet ministers in fifteen years and as being necessary to attract qualified people to politics.

In early 2009, in response to the Late-2000s recession, Stelmach announced that his caucus would decline an automatic 4.9% cost of living pay increase. The following week, the legislature's all-party Standing Committee on Member Services extended this to all MLAs by voting unanimously to freeze MLA salaries for the fiscal year.

=== Health policy ===
Stelmach's policy on health care was highlighted by his removal of the province's health care premiums effective the end of 2008. Critics had denounced the premiums as being regressive, both because they were the same amount regardless of the payer's income and because people with better-paying jobs often had their premiums covered by their employer. The opposition Liberal and New Democratic parties had long called for their removal. This elimination was announced in a throne speech immediately before the dissolution of the legislature for the 2008 election, although it was initially promised to take effect by 2012. During this campaign, Stelmach promised to increase the capacity of Alberta universities to train doctors and nurses over four years, eventually resulting in the graduation of 225 more doctors, 350 more registered nurses, and 220 licensed practical nurses. After the registrar of the Alberta College of Physicians and Surgeons called the plan unfeasible, Health Minister Dave Hancock clarified that most of the increase would in fact come from the immigration of foreign doctors to Alberta, rather than from in-province training.

Following the election, Stelmach's new Minister of Health, Ron Liepert, released the government's new health plan. In it, Liepert refused to characterize the problems in the health care system as being the result of doctor shortages, and instead promised structural reforms. He indicated that these may include consolidating health authorities, closing rural hospitals, and de-listing some health services from coverage under the province's public health insurance scheme. In May, the government took the first step in implementing these structural reforms by combining the province's nine health authorities into one health "superboard".

In June 2008, three senior health officials announced that they would be leaving the province's employment at the expiration of their contracts in August. Liepert blamed their departures on better offers from other employers, although New Democrat leader Brian Mason speculated that the government's health restructuring may have been to blame. Detractors pointed out that the optics of allowing the employees to depart for more money elsewhere soon after the government had approved a substantial pay hike for cabinet ministers were not good.

As the province's fiscal situation worsened in late 2008, the government adapted its health policy. In December, Liepert announced a new seniors drug plan that made drugs free for seniors making less than $21,325 but required those making more to pay as much as $7,500 for their drugs. In response to protests from seniors, he amended the plan in April 2009 to reduce both the income level at which seniors would have to start paying and the amount which those seniors would have to pay. Liepert said that the plan, $10 million more expensive than the one he had announced in December, would see 60% of seniors pay less than they did under the status quo. The same month, Stelmach's government's budget revealed changes to which medical services it would cover: those de-listed included chiropractic services, at an annual savings of $53 million, and sex change operations, at an annual savings of $700,000. While the Canada Health Act requires the federal government to financially penalize provinces that do not support all "medically necessary" procedures, Liepert maintained that the de-listed services were not "medically necessary" from the perspective of the act, and said that he anticipated no trouble from the federal government.

During the 2009 H1N1 pandemic, Stelmach initially announced that the government would make the vaccine available to all Albertans, though vaccine shortages resulted in a limited number of clinics, which experienced long lineups. In response, Liberal leader David Swann accused the government of managing limited vaccine supplies poorly by not giving priority to the most vulnerable groups. Liepert defended the government's record by saying that high risk populations had been given priority, but that the government's policy was to turn nobody away; he blamed many of the problems on the federal government's delivery to the province of fewer doses of the vaccine than promised. Further controversy erupted when it was revealed that hockey players on the Calgary Flames were vaccinated with vaccine received directly from Alberta Health Services, which prompted Stelmach to announce an investigation. Two Alberta Health Services employees were fired as a result of the investigation.

=== Human Rights, Citizenship, and Multiculturalism Act ===
In spring 2009, Stelmach's government announced its intention to overhaul the Alberta Human Rights, Citizenship, and Multiculturalism Act. In 1998's Vriend v. Alberta, the Supreme Court of Canada had found that the legislation's failure to include sexual orientation among the grounds on which discrimination was prohibited violated the Canadian Charter of Rights and Freedoms and had "read in" this protection. However, the text of the act continued not to mention sexual orientation. Gay rights activists and opposition politicians hoped that the government's proposed changes to the act would change this.

This section had been used to try to prosecute Ezra Levant for publishing the cartoons at the centre of the Jyllands-Posten Muhammad cartoons controversy in his Western Standard magazine, and to successfully prosecute the Red Deer Advocate for publishing a letter to the editor entitled "Homosexual agenda wicked".

The changes that were eventually tabled included the enshrining of sexual orientation as protected grounds but not the removal of the section dealing with "exposing to contempt." This omission was criticized, Levant said that it made him "deeply embarrassed as a conservative," but Stelmach said that his caucus was comfortable that another provision, requiring that the impugned section should not "be deemed to interfere with the free expression of opinion on any subject", protected Albertans against its abusive use. The proposal also included a section entitling parents to advance notice from schools if their children were going to be taught "subject-matter that deals explicitly with religion, sexuality or sexual orientation" and the right to remove their children from such classes. Stelmach called this a "very, very fundamental right" and suggested that it would allow parents to opt out of having their children learn about evolution, though his Education Minister Dave Hancock argued that the new wording didn't extend beyond current practice. Alberta Teachers' Association President Frank Bruseker expressed concern that this would make the teaching of science and geography in public schools very difficult, and suggested that parents who did not wish to have their children exposed to evolution should home school them or send them to private school. New Democratic Party leader Brian Mason suggested that the changes would make Alberta "sound like Arkansas".

=== Democratic reform ===
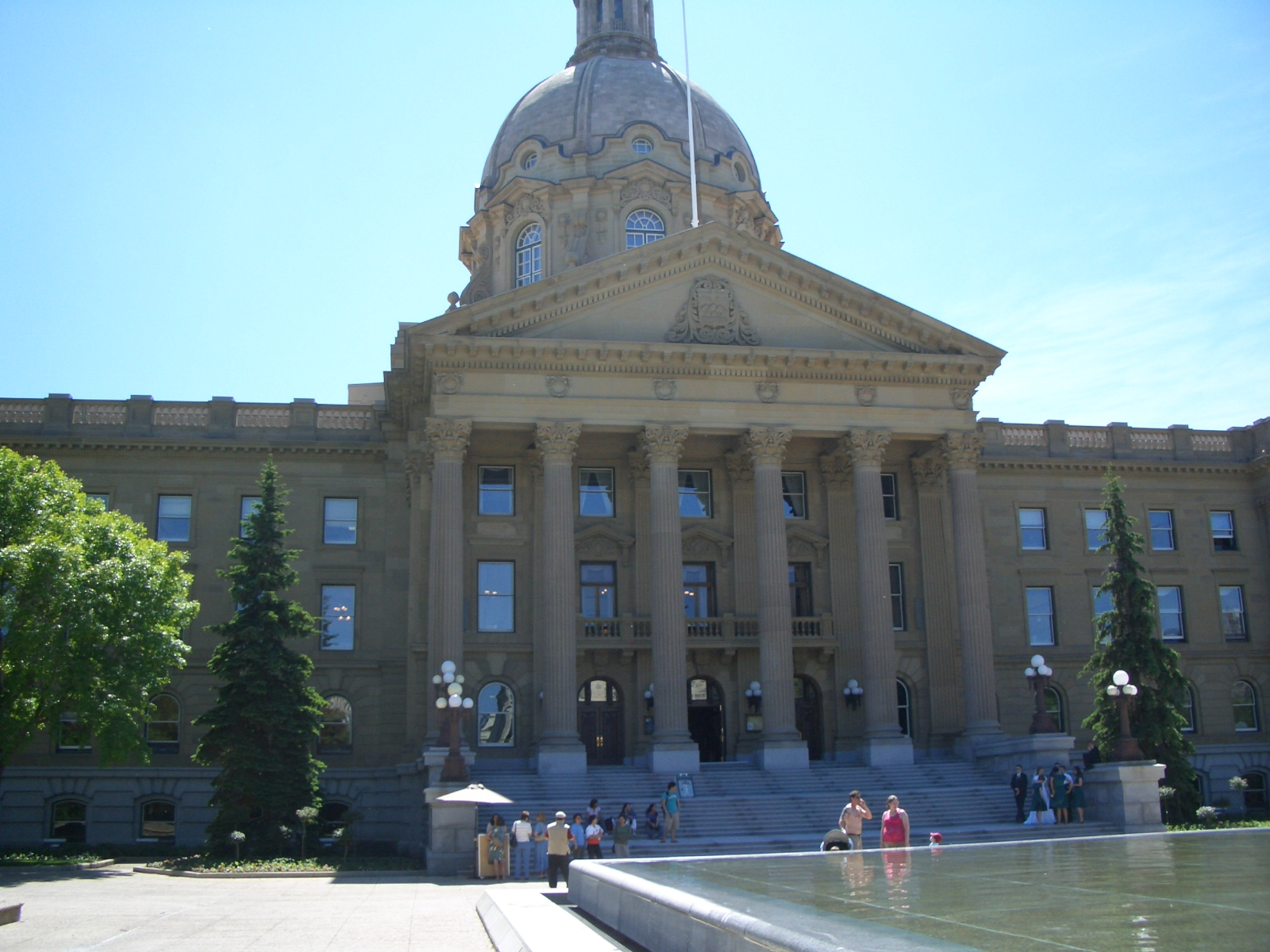
Stelmach returned all-party committees to the Legislative Assembly of Alberta, where they had not existed since early in Ralph Klein's tenure.

Klein's government had received criticism for reducing the importance of the legislature by sitting it fewer days than any other province's legislature and for directing business through standing policy committees of the Progressive Conservative caucus. These committees met in private, unlike the legislature's all-party committees, which fell almost entirely out of use during the Klein years. In April 2007, Stelmach initiated the creation of four new legislative "policy field committees" which would include opposition representation. The same month, his government introduced new legislation on conflicts of interest, such that former cabinet ministers would have to wait one year before doing business with the government or lobbying it on behalf of third parties (up from six months). It also created a similar cooling-off period for senior bureaucrats, which lasted six months. However, an Order in Council passed by Stelmach's cabinet shortly before the 2008 election delayed the implementation of these rules until one month after the election, meaning that cabinet ministers who retired or lost their bids for re-election would be exempt from the new rules.

=== Relationship with Calgary ===
Critics of Stelmach suggest that, as a farmer from the central part of the province, he is biased against Calgary and urban Alberta in general. They pointed to the fact that the city, which was considered the heartland of Jim Dinning's support during the leadership race, had only three members (Ron Liepert, Ron Stevens, and Greg Melchin) in his first eighteen-member cabinet (Stelmach supporters pointed out that Edmonton had only one minister, Dave Hancock). Stelmach also found himself in a feud with Calgary mayor Dave Bronconnier during his first year as premier as Bronconnier accused Stelmach of failing to keep a promise to the city regarding infrastructure spending during his first budget. Several Stelmach supporters suggested that the mayor, a Liberal, might be angling to take over as leader of the official opposition if Kevin Taft fumbled. During the by-election to fill Ralph Klein's Calgary Elbow seat, P.C. candidate Brian Heninger went so far as to tell a voter he'd like to choke his party's leader (Stelmach told media that this was the sort of enthusiasm he wanted from his MLAs). Heninger was defeated by Liberal Craig Cheffins and, in the 2008 election, Calgary was the only area of the province in which Stelmach lost seats on his way to an increased majority.

After Deputy Premier Ron Stevens resigned his Calgary-Glenmore seat to accept a judgeship, a 2009 by-election elected outgoing Wildrose Alliance Party (WRA) leader Paul Hinman to replace him. Hinman had been the WRA's only MLA until he lost his Cardston-Taber-Warner to Progressive Conservative Broyce Jacobs in the 2008 election. Shortly after Hinman's election, polls showed that the Wildrose Alliance, under new leader Danielle Smith, was the second most popular party province-wide, and led the Conservatives 34 percent to 30 percent in Calgary.

=== Politics and public opinion ===
Critics at first compared Stelmach to Harry Strom, the last Social Credit premier of the province. Strom was regarded as honest but ineffective and lacking charisma; he survived only long enough as Premier to lose the 1971 election soundly. Thus ended the last long one-party rule, and observers asked if history would repeat with Stelmach. After Stelmach's landslide win in the 2008 election, when his Conservatives took 53 percent of the vote, however, such comparisons largely ceased.

In late 2009, the Conservatives' plunging popularity at the polls and the surge in support for the right-wing Wildrose Alliance led to speculation that Stelmach would receive lukewarm support at his mandatory leadership review, to be held at the November 2009 Progressive Conservative convention. Klein's resignation came in the wake of his receiving only 55% support at such a review, and Klein suggested that Stelmach should resign if he received less than 70%. The question was whether party leaders would blame Stelmach for the party's decline and look for new leadership in the face of Stelmach's own weakening poll numbers. Instead, Stelmach met the criterion set up by his critics and won 77.4% support, a strong endorsement.

=== Resignation ===
On January 25, 2011, Stelmach announced that he would not seek re-election; he also promised a leadership race before the next election. He did not specify his date of resignation at that time, however he submitted his letter of resignation in June, writing that he would leave office on October 1. In the early hours of October 2, 2011, Alison Redford was declared the new leader of the party, and Stelmach resigned as premier on October 7.

== Awards and recognitions ==
- Order of Prince Yaroslav the Wise, Class III (Ukraine, 2009)
- Alberta Order of Excellence (2020)

== Electoral record ==
2008 Alberta general election results (Fort Saskatchewan-Vegreville)		Turnout 53.6%	
Affiliation	Candidate	Votes	%
Progressive Conservative	Ed Stelmach	11,162	77.6%
Liberal	Earl J. Woods	1,343	9.3%
NDP	Clayton Marsden	1,235	8.6%
Greens	Ryan Scheie	551	3.8%
2004 Alberta general election results (Fort Saskatchewan-Vegreville)		Turnout 51.5%	
Affiliation	Candidate	Votes	%
Progressive Conservative	Ed Stelmach	6,160	48.3%
Liberal	Peter Schneider	3,160	24.8%
NDP	Wes Buyarski	1,633	12.8%
Alberta Alliance	Byron King	1411	11.1%
Social Credit	Mark Patterson	379	3.0%
2001 Alberta general election results (Vegreville-Viking)		Turnout 61.8%	
Affiliation	Candidate	Votes	%
Progressive Conservative	Ed Stelmach	7,191	60.8%
Liberal	Ross Demkiw	3,391	28.7%
NDP	Greg Kurolok	1,243	10.5%
1997 Alberta general election results (Vegreville-Viking)		Turnout 64.2%	
Affiliation	Candidate	Votes	%
Progressive Conservative	Ed Stelmach	6,090	49.8%
Liberal	Ross Demkiw	3,639	29.8%
NDP	Greg Kurolok	1,684	13.8%
Social Credit	Clifford Gundermann	810	6.6%
1993 Alberta general election results (Vegreville-Viking)		Turnout 69.7%	
Affiliation	Candidate	Votes	%
Progressive Conservative	Ed Stelmach	5,540	41.1%
NDP	Derek Fox	4,150	30.1%
Liberal	Jerry Wilde	3,797	28.2%

=== Party leadership contests ===
2006 Progressive Conservative Association of Alberta leadership election
Second ballot (post redistribution)
Candidate	Votes	Percentage
Ed Stelmach	77,577	58.3%
Jim Dinning	55,509	41.7%
Second ballot
Candidate	Votes	Percentage
Ed Stelmach	51,764	35.9%
Jim Dinning	51,282	35.6%
Ted Morton	41,243	28.6%
First ballot
Candidate	Votes	Percentage
Jim Dinning	29,470	30.2%
Ted Morton	25,614	26.2%
Ed Stelmach	14,967	15.3%
Lyle Oberg	11,638	11.9%
Dave Hancock	7,595	7.8%
Mark Norris	6,789	6.9%
Victor Doerksen	873	0.9%
Gary McPherson	744	0.8%

Order of precedence
Preceded by Lois Mitchell, Former Lieutenant Governor of Alberta	Order of precedence in Alberta as of 2020	Succeeded by Alison Redford, former premier of Alberta
