= James L. McPherson =

Canadian politician

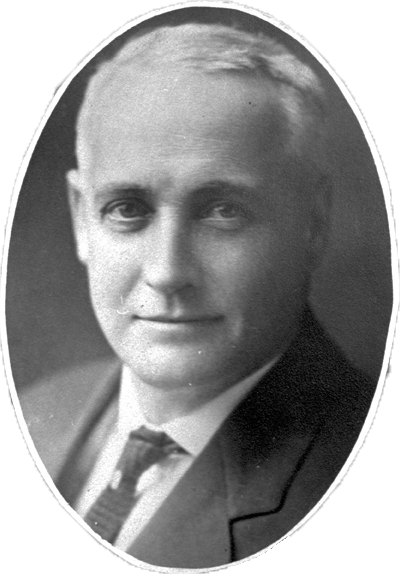

Member of the Legislative Assembly of Alberta
- In office 1935–1940
- Preceded by: Archie Matheson
- Succeeded by: Michael Ponich
- Constituency: Vegreville
- In office 1940–1948
- Constituency: Bruce

Personal details
- Born: March 29, 1881 Leaswater, Ontario
- Died: January 3, 1951 (aged 69) Ryley, Alberta
- Party: Social Credit
- Occupation: doctor

James L. McPherson (March 29, 1881 – January 3, 1951) was a Canadian politician and physician from Alberta.

== Early life ==
James L. McPherson was born on March 29, 1881, at Leaswater, Ontario to William McPherson and Katherine Orr, both of Scottish descent. He was educated at Owen Sound, Hamilton and Toronto. McPherson married the daughter of J. H. Thorsley on August 9, 1911.

== Political life ==
McPherson was a member of the Legislative Assembly of Alberta from 1935 to 1948, representing the Alberta Social Credit Party. He served on the Social Credit Board following the 1937 Social Credit backbenchers' revolt. He died in Ryley, Alberta in 1951.
