= Derek Fox (Canadian politician) =

Canadian politician

Member of the Legislative Assembly of Alberta for Vegreville
- In office 1986–1993
- Preceded by: John Batiuk
- Succeeded by: district abolished

Personal details
- Born: December 27, 1950 (age 75) New Westminster, British Columbia
- Party: Alberta New Democratic Party

Gordon Derek Fox (born December 27, 1950) is an insurance agent and former provincial level politician from Alberta, Canada. He served as a member of the Legislative Assembly of Alberta from 1986 to 1993.

== Political career ==
Fox ran for a seat in the Alberta Legislature in the 1986 Alberta general election as a candidate for the New Democrats. He won the electoral district of Vegreville defeating Progressive Conservative candidate Ron Rudkowsky and two other candidates in a hotly contested race. He ran for a second term in office in the 1989 Alberta general election winning an increased plurality defeating two other candidates. Vegreville was abolished in the boundary redistribution of 1993. Fox ran for re-election in the new electoral district of Vegreville-Viking. He was defeated running in the general election held that year, losing his seat to Progressive Conservative candidate Ed Stelmach.

== Late life ==
After being defeated from provincial politics, Fox joined Manulife Financial and became the operator of the company's branch in Vegreville. He also runs the Warwick Hall.
