= Vegreville-Viking =

Defunct provincial electoral district in Alberta, Canada

Coordinates: 53.29°N 111.88°W

Alberta electoral district

Defunct provincial electoral district
- Legislature: Legislative Assembly of Alberta
- District created: 1993
- District abolished: 2004
- First contested: 1993
- Last contested: 2001

Vegreville-Viking was a provincial electoral district in Alberta, Canada, mandated to return a single member to the Legislative Assembly of Alberta from 1993 to 2004.

== History ==
The Vegreville-Viking electoral district was created in the 1993 electoral boundary re-distribution from the Vegreville and Vermilion-Viking electoral districts.

The Vegreville-Viking electoral district would be abolished in the 2004 electoral boundary re-distribution with a majority of the district forming the new Fort Saskatchewan-Vegreville electoral district and small portions of the eastern part of the district forming Lac La Biche-St. Paul and Vermilion-Lloydminster electoral districts.

=== Members of the Legislative Assembly (MLAs) ===
Members of the Legislative Assembly for Vegreville-Viking
Assembly	Years	Member	Party
See Vegreville electoral district from 1971-1993 and Vermilion-Viking electoral district from 1971-1993
23rd	1993–1997	Ed Stelmach	Progressive Conservative
24th	1997–2001	Ed Stelmach	Progressive Conservative
25th	2001–2004	Ed Stelmach	Progressive Conservative
See Fort Saskatchewan-Vegreville electoral district from 2004-Present

== Election results ==
=== 1993 ===
1993 Alberta general election
Party	Candidate	Votes	%	±%
Progressive Conservative	Ed Stelmach	5,540	41.08%	–
New Democratic	Derek Fox	4,150	30.77%	–
Liberal	Jerry Wilde	3,797	28.15%	–
Total		13,487	–	–
Rejected, spoiled and declined		31	–	–
Eligible electors / turnout		19,391	69.71%	–
Progressive Conservative pickup new district.				
Source(s) Source: "Vegreville-Viking Official Results 1993 Alberta general election". Alberta Heritage Community Foundation.

=== 1997 ===
1997 Alberta general election
Party	Candidate	Votes	%	±%
Progressive Conservative	Ed Stelmach	6,090	49.82%	8.75%
Liberal	Ross Demkiw	3,639	29.77%	1.62%
New Democratic	Greg Kurulok	1,684	13.78%	-16.99%
Social Credit	Clifford Gundermann	810	6.63%	–
Total		12,223	–	–
Rejected, spoiled and declined		29	–	–
Eligible electors / turnout		19,033	64.37%	-5.34%
Progressive Conservative hold		Swing		4.87%
Source(s) Source: "Vegreville-Viking Official Results 1997 Alberta general election". Alberta Heritage Community Foundation.

=== 2001 ===
2001 Alberta general election
Party	Candidate	Votes	%	±%
Progressive Conservative	Ed Stelmach	7,191	60.81%	10.99%
Liberal	Ross Demkiw	3,391	28.68%	-1.10%
New Democratic	Greg Kurulok	1,243	10.51%	-3.27%
Total		11,825	–	–
Rejected, spoiled and declined		36	–	–
Eligible electors / turnout		19,187	61.82%	-2.55%
Progressive Conservative hold		Swing		6.04%
Source(s) Source: "Vegreville-Viking Official Results 2001 Alberta general election". Alberta Heritage Community Foundation.

== See also ==
- List of Alberta provincial electoral districts
- Canadian provincial electoral districts
- Vegreville, a town in eastern Alberta
- Viking, a town in eastern Alberta
