= List of Alberta by-elections =

The list of Alberta by-elections includes every by-election held in the Canadian province of Alberta. By-elections occur whenever there is a vacancy in the Legislative Assembly, although an imminent general election may allow the vacancy to remain until the dissolution of parliament. Until 1926 incumbent members were required to recontest their seats upon being appointed to Cabinet. These Ministerial by-elections were almost always uncontested.

== 31st Legislative Assembly of Alberta 2023–present ==
By-election	Date	Incumbent	Party	Winner	Party	Cause	Retained
Calgary-Shaw	September 14, 2026	Rebecca Schulz	United Conservative Party	Kyle Campbell	New Democratic	Resigned.	No
Olds-Didsbury-Three Hills	June 23, 2025	Nathan Cooper	United Conservative Party	Tara Sawyer	United Conservative Party	Resigned to become Alberta's representative in Washington, D.C.	Yes
Edmonton-Ellerslie	June 23, 2025	Rod Loyola	New Democratic	Gurtej Singh Brar	New Democratic	Resigned to run federally in Edmonton Gateway.	Yes
Edmonton-Strathcona	June 23, 2025	Rachel Notley	New Democratic	Naheed Nenshi	New Democratic	Resigned.	Yes
Lethbridge-West	December 18, 2024	Shannon Phillips	New Democratic	Rob Miyashiro	New Democratic	Resigned for personal reasons.	Yes

== 30th Legislative Assembly of Alberta 2019–2023 ==
By-election	Date	Incumbent	Party	Winner	Party	Cause	Retained
Brooks-Medicine Hat	November 8, 2022	Michaela Frey	United Conservative	Danielle Smith	United Conservative	Resigned to provide a seat for new UCP leader and Premier of Alberta, Danielle Smith.	Yes
Fort McMurray-Lac La Biche	March 15, 2022	Laila Goodridge	United Conservative	Brian Jean	United Conservative	Resigned to run federally in Fort McMurray—Cold Lake; elected.	Yes

== 29th Legislative Assembly of Alberta 2015–2019 ==
By-election	Date	Incumbent	Party	Winner	Party	Cause	Retained
Fort McMurray-Conklin	July 12, 2018	Brian Jean	United Conservative	Laila Goodridge	United Conservative	Resigned several months after losing the UCP leadership election to Jason Kenney.	Yes
Innisfail-Sylvan Lake	July 12, 2018	Don MacIntyre	United Conservative	Devin Dreeshen	United Conservative	Resigned after being charged with sexual interference with a minor.	Yes
Calgary-Lougheed	December 14, 2017	Dave Rodney	United Conservative	Jason Kenney	United Conservative	Resigned to provide a seat for new UCP leader Jason Kenney	Yes
Calgary-Greenway	March 22, 2016	Manmeet Bhullar	Progressive Conservative	Prabhdeep Gill	Progressive Conservative	Killed in highway accident	Yes
Calgary-Foothills	September 3, 2015	Jim Prentice	Progressive Conservative	Prasad Panda	Wildrose	Disclaimed seat and resigned as party leader following government's defeat in general election	No

== 28th Legislative Assembly of Alberta 2012–2015 ==
By-election	Date	Incumbent	Party	Winner	Party	Cause	Retained
Calgary-West	October 27, 2014	Ken Hughes	Progressive Conservative	Mike Ellis	Progressive Conservative	Resignation	Yes
Calgary-Foothills	October 27, 2014	Len Webber	Independent	Jim Prentice	Progressive Conservative	Resignation to run federally. Independent MLA originally elected as PC.	No
Edmonton-Whitemud	October 27, 2014	Dave Hancock	Progressive Conservative	Stephen Mandel	Progressive Conservative	Resignation	Yes
Calgary-Elbow	October 27, 2014	Alison Redford	Progressive Conservative	Gordon Dirks	Progressive Conservative	Resignation	Yes

== 27th Legislative Assembly of Alberta 2008–2012 ==
By-election	Date	Incumbent	Party	Winner	Party	Cause	Retained
Calgary-Glenmore	September 14, 2009	Ron Stevens	Progressive Conservative	Paul Hinman	Wildrose Alliance	Resignation to be appointed a judge	No

== 26th Legislative Assembly of Alberta 2004–2008 ==
By-election	Date	Incumbent	Party	Winner	Party	Cause	Retained
Drumheller-Stettler	June 12, 2007	Shirley McClellan	Progressive Conservative	Jack Hayden	Progressive Conservative	Resignation	Yes
Calgary-Elbow	June 12, 2007	Ralph Klein	Progressive Conservative	Craig Cheffins	Liberal	Resignation	No

== 25th Legislative Assembly of Alberta 2001–2004 ==
By-election	Date	Incumbent	Party	Winner	Party	Cause	Retained
Wainwright	April 8, 2002	Robert Fischer	Progressive Conservative	Doug Griffiths	Progressive Conservative	Resignation	Yes

== 24th Legislative Assembly of Alberta 1997–2001 ==
By-election	Date	Incumbent	Party	Winner	Party	Cause	Retained
Red Deer-North	September 25, 2000	Stockwell Day	Progressive Conservative	Mary Anne Jablonski	Progressive Conservative	Resignation to run federally	Yes
Edmonton-Highlands	June 12, 2000	Pam Barrett	New Democratic	Brian Mason	New Democratic	Resignation	Yes
Edmonton McClung	June 17, 1998	Grant Mitchell	Liberal	Nancy MacBeth	Liberal	Resignation	Yes

== 23rd Legislative Assembly of Alberta 1993–1997 ==
By-election	Date	Incumbent	Party	Winner	Party	Cause	Retained
Redwater	May 21, 1996	Nicholas Taylor	Liberal	Mary Anne Balsillie	Liberal	Appointed to the Senate	Yes
Calgary-McCall	April 20, 1995	Harry Sohal	Progressive Conservative	Shiraz Shariff	Progressive Conservative	Death	Yes

== 22nd Legislative Assembly of Alberta 1989–1993 ==
By-election	Date	Incumbent	Party	Winner	Party	Cause	Retained
Three Hills	October 26, 1992	Connie Osterman	Progressive Conservative	Don MacDonald	Liberal	Resignation	No
Calgary-Buffalo	July 21, 1992	Sheldon Chumir	Liberal	Gary Dickson	Liberal	Death	Yes
Little Bow	March 5, 1992	Raymond Speaker	Progressive Conservative	Barry McFarland	Progressive Conservative	Resignation	Yes
Edmonton-Strathcona	December 17, 1990	Gordon Wright	New Democratic	Barrie Chivers	New Democratic	Death	Yes
Stettler	May 9, 1989	Brian C. Downey	Progressive Conservative	Don Getty	Progressive Conservative	Resignation to provide a seat for Premier Getty, after he lost his seat in the general election.	Yes

== 21st Legislative Assembly of Alberta 1986–1989 ==
By-election	Date	Incumbent	Party	Winner	Party	Cause	Retained
Chinook	November 23, 1987	Henry Kroeger	Progressive Conservative	Shirley McClellan	Progressive Conservative	Death	Yes

== 20th Legislative Assembly of Alberta 1982–1986 ==
By-election	Date	Incumbent	Party	Winner	Party	Cause	Retained
Edmonton-Whitemud	December 11, 1985	Robert Keith Alexander	Progressive Conservative	Don Getty	Progressive Conservative	Resignation to provide a seat for Premier Getty after his election as PC leader.	Yes
Spirit River-Fairview	February 21, 1985	Grant Notley	New Democratic	Jim Gurnett	New Democratic	Death (airplane crash)	Yes

== 19th Legislative Assembly of Alberta 1979–1982 ==
By-election	Date	Incumbent	Party	Winner	Party	Cause	Retained
Olds-Didsbury	February 17, 1982	Robert C. Clark	Social Credit	Gordon Kesler	Western Canada Concept	Resignation	No
Barrhead	November 21, 1979	Hugh Horner	Progressive Conservative	Ken Kowalski	Progressive Conservative	Resignation	Yes

== 18th Legislative Assembly of Alberta 1975–1979 ==
no by-elections

== 17th Legislative Assembly of Alberta 1971–1975 ==
By-election	Date	Incumbent	Party	Winner	Party	Cause	Retained
Calgary-Foothills	June 25, 1973	Len Werry	Progressive Conservative	Stewart McCrae	Progressive Conservative	Death	Yes
Stettler	February 14, 1972	Jack Robertson	Progressive Conservative	Graham Harle	Progressive Conservative	Death	Yes

== 16th Legislative Assembly of Alberta 1967–1971 ==
By-election	Date	Incumbent	Party	Winner	Party	Cause	Retained
Edson	October 28, 1969	William Switzer	Liberal	Robert Wagner Dowling	Progressive Conservative	Death	No
Strathcona East	February 10, 1969	Ernest Manning	Social Credit	William Yurko	Progressive Conservative	Resignation concurrent with his retirement as Premier.	No
Lac La Biche	August 20, 1968	Michael Maccagno	Liberal	Damase Bouvier	Social Credit	Resignation to run federally	No

== 15th Legislative Assembly of Alberta 1963–1967 ==
By-election	Date	Incumbent	Party	Winner	Party	Cause	Retained
Pincher Creek-Crowsnest	October 6, 1966	William Kovach	Social Credit	Garth Turcott	New Democratic	Death	No
Edson	March 29, 1965	Norman Willmore	Social Credit	William Switzer	Liberal	Death	No
Three Hills	January 20, 1964	Petrie Meston	Social Credit	Roy Davidson	Social Credit	Death	Yes

== 14th Legislative Assembly of Alberta 1959–1963 ==
By-election	Date	Incumbent	Party	Winner	Party	Cause	Retained
Bonnyville	November 27, 1961	Karl Nordstrom	Social Credit	Romeo Lamothe	Social Credit	Death	Yes
Peace River	October 26, 1961	William Gilliland	Social Credit	Euell Montgomery	Social Credit	Death	Yes
Medicine Hat	January 19, 1961	Elizabeth G. Robinson	Social Credit	Harry Leinweber	Social Credit	Death	Yes
Didsbury	November 30, 1960	James Lawrence Owens	Social Credit	Robert Curtis Clark	Social Credit	Death	Yes

== 13th Legislative Assembly of Alberta 1955–1959 ==
By-election	Date	Incumbent	Party	Winner	Party	Cause	Retained
Olds	February 9, 1959	Frederick Niddrie	Social Credit	Roderick Macleod	Social Credit	Death	Yes
Calgary	October 2, 1957	Arthur Ryan Smith	Conservative	Ernest Watkins	Conservative	Resignation to run federally	Yes
Stettler	November 15, 1956	John Etter Clark	Social Credit	Galen Norris	Social Credit	Death (Committed suicide after murdering seven people)	Yes

== 12th Legislative Assembly of Alberta 1952–1955 ==
By-election	Date	Incumbent	Party	Winner	Party	Cause	Retained
Red Deer	February 15, 1954	David A. Ure	Social Credit	Cam Kirby	Conservative	Death	No
Medicine Hat	December 21, 1953	John Lyle Robinson	Social Credit	Elizabeth G. Robinson	Social Credit	Death	Yes

== 11th Legislative Assembly of Alberta 1948–1952 ==
By-election	Date	Incumbent	Party	Winner	Party	Cause	Retained
Grouard	June 21, 1951	John Barrett Wood	Social Credit	Joseph Desfosses	Liberal	Resignation	No
Olds	November 16, 1950	Norman E. Cook	Social Credit	Frederick Niddrie	Social Credit	Death	Yes

== 10th Legislative Assembly of Alberta 1944–1948 ==
By-election	Date	Incumbent	Party	Winner	Party	Cause	Retained
Warner	August 6, 1945	Solon Earl Low	Social Credit	Leonard Halmrast	Social Credit	Resignation to run federally	Yes

== 9th Legislative Assembly of Alberta 1940–1944 ==
By-election	Date	Incumbent	Party	Winner	Party	Cause	Retained
Red Deer	December 16, 1943	Alfred Speakman	Independent	David A. Ure	Social Credit	Death	No
Edmonton	September 22, 1942	David Milwyn Duggan	Independent	Elmer Ernest Roper	Cooperative Commonwealth	Death	No
Camrose	February 6, 1941	David Bertrum Mullen	Social Credit	Chester Sayers	Social Credit	Death	Yes
Vegreville	June 20, 1940†	George Woytkiw	Social Credit	Solon Earl Low	Social Credit	Resignation to provide a seat for Low	Yes

† Won by acclamation

== 8th Legislative Assembly of Alberta 1935–1940 ==
By-election	Date	Incumbent	Party	Winner	Party	Cause	Retained
Athabasca	November 7, 1938	Charles Cathmer Ross	Social Credit	Clarence Tade	Social Credit	Death	Yes
Lethbridge	December 2, 1937	Hans Wight	Social Credit	Peter M. Campbell	Unity	Resignation	No
Edmonton	October 7, 1937	George Van Allen	Liberal	Edward Leslie Gray	Liberal	Death	Yes
Grouard	December 7, 1936	Leonidas Giroux	Liberal	Joseph Tremblay	Liberal	Death	Yes
Edmonton	June 22, 1936	William R. Howson	Liberal	Walter Morrish	Liberal	Appointed a judge	Yes
Okotoks-High River	November 4, 1935†	William Morrison	Social Credit	William Aberhart	Social Credit	Resignation to provide a seat for Aberhart	Yes
Athabasca	November 4, 1935†	Clarence Tade	Social Credit	Charles Cathmer Ross	Social Credit	Resignation to provide a seat for Ross	Yes

† Won by acclamation

== 7th Legislative Assembly of Alberta 1930–1935 ==
By-election	Date	Incumbent	Party	Winner	Party	Cause	Retained
Calgary	January 15, 1934	George Harry Webster	Liberal	William Henry Ross	Liberal	Death	Yes
Calgary	January 19, 1933	Harold McGill	Conservative	Norman Hindsley	Independent	Appointed Superintendent-General of Indian Affairs	No
Camrose	October 25, 1932	Vernor Smith	United Farmers	Chester Ronning	United Farmers	Death	Yes
Red Deer	November 16, 1931	George Wilbert Smith	United Farmers	William Ernest Payne	Conservative	Death	No
Edmonton	January 9, 1931	Charles Yardley Weaver	Conservative	Frederick Jamieson	Conservative	Death	Yes

== 6th Legislative Assembly of Alberta 1926–1930 ==
By-election	Date	Incumbent	Party	Winner	Party	Cause	Retained
Medicine Hat	May 1, 1928	Charles Pingle	Liberal	Hector Lang	Liberal	Death	Yes

== 5th Legislative Assembly of Alberta 1921–1926 ==
By-election	Date	Incumbent	Party	Winner	Party	Cause	Retained
Medicine Hat	September 29, 1925	William Johnston	Dominion Labor	Charles Pingle	Liberal	Death	No
Edmonton	October 27, 1924	John R. Boyle	Liberal	William Thomas Henry	Liberal	Resignation. Appointed a judge	Yes
Grouard	July 11, 1924	Jean Côté	Liberal	Leonidas Giroux	Liberal	Resignation. Appointed to the Senate	Yes
Calgary	January 15, 1923	Robert Chambers Edwards	Independent	William McCartney Davidson	Independent	Death	Yes
Whitford	July 10, 1922	Andrew Shandro	Liberal	Mike Chornohus	United Farmers	Result of previous election voided.	No
Sedgewick	July 10, 1922†	Charles Stewart	Liberal	Albert Andrews	United Farmers	Resignation. Appointed to the federal cabinet	No
Ribstone	July 10, 1922	Charles O. Wright	United Farmers	William Farquharson	United Farmers	Death	Yes
Vermilion	December 9, 1921†	Richard Gavin Reid	United Farmers	Richard Gavin Reid	United Farmers	Sought re-election upon appointment as Minister of Health and Municipal Affairs	Yes
Ponoka	December 9, 1921†	Percival Baker	United Farmers	John Edward Brownlee	United Farmers	Death	Yes
Peace River	December 9, 1921†	Donald MacBeth Kennedy	United Farmers	Herbert Greenfield	United Farmers	Resignation to provide a seat for Premier Greenfield and to run federally	Yes
Okotoks	December 9, 1921†	George Hoadley	United Farmers	George Hoadley	United Farmers	Sought re-election upon appointment as Minister of Agriculture	Yes
Medicine Hat	December 9, 1921†	Perren Baker	United Farmers	Perren Baker	United Farmers	Sought re-election upon appointment as Minister of Education	Yes
Camrose	December 9, 1921†	Vernor Smith	United Farmers	Vernor Smith	United Farmers	Sought re-election upon appointment as Minister of Railways and Telephones	Yes
Calgary	December 9, 1921†	Alex Ross	Dominion Labor	Alex Ross	Dominion Labor	Sought re-election upon appointment as Minister of Public Works	Yes

† Won by acclamation

== 4th Legislative Assembly of Alberta 1917–1921 ==
By-election	Date	Incumbent	Party	Winner	Party	Cause	Retained
Athabasca	June 3, 1920	Alexander Grant MacKay	Liberal	George Mills	Liberal	Death	Yes
Cochrane	November 3, 1919	Charles W. Fisher	Liberal	Alexander Moore	United Farmers	Death	No
Red Deer	October 28, 1918	Edward Michener	Conservative	John Gaetz	Liberal	Appointed to the Senate	No
Grouard	October 21, 1918†	Jean Côté	Liberal	Jean Côté	Liberal	Sought reelection upon appointment as Provincial Secretary	Yes
Athabasca	September 27, 1918†	Alexander Grant MacKay	Liberal	Alexander Grant MacKay	Liberal	Sought reelection upon appointment as Minister of Municipal Affairs	Yes
Vermilion	November 19, 1917†	Arthur Sifton	Liberal	Arthur Ebbett	Liberal	Appointed to the federal cabinet	Yes
Camrose	November 9, 1917	George P. Smith	Liberal	George P. Smith	Liberal	Sought reelection upon appointment as Provincial Secretary	Yes

† Won by acclamation

== 3rd Legislative Assembly of Alberta 1913–1917 ==
By-election	Date	Incumbent	Party	Winner	Party	Cause	Retained
Whitford	March 15, 1915	Andrew Shandro	Liberal	Andrew Shandro	Liberal	Void Election	Yes
Wetaskiwin	November 17, 1914	Charles H. Olin	Liberal	Hugh John Montgomery	Liberal	Death	Yes
Beaver River	December 15, 1913†	Wilfrid Gariépy	Liberal	Wilfrid Gariépy	Liberal	Sought reelection upon appointment as Minister of Municipal Affairs	Yes
Bow Valley	June 12, 1913†	George Lane	Liberal	Charles Richmond Mitchell	Liberal	Resignation to provide a seat for Mitchell	Yes

† Won by acclamation

== 2nd Legislative Assembly of Alberta 1909–1913 ==
By-election	Date	Incumbent	Party	Winner	Party	Cause	Retained
Sturgeon	May 27, 1912	John R. Boyle	Liberal	John R. Boyle	Liberal	Sought reelection upon appointment as Minister of Education	Yes
Sedgewick	May 27, 1912	Charles Stewart	Liberal	Charles Stewart	Liberal	Sought reelection upon appointment as Minister of Municipal Affairs	Yes
Edmonton	May 27, 1912	Charles Wilson Cross	Liberal	Charles Wilson Cross	Liberal	Sought reelection upon appointment as Attorney General	Yes
Claresholm	May 27, 1912	Malcolm McKenzie	Liberal	Malcolm McKenzie	Liberal	Sought reelection upon appointment as Provincial Treasurer	Yes
Cardston	May 27, 1912	John William Woolf	Liberal	Martin Woolf	Liberal	Resignation	Yes
Pincher Creek	October 31, 1911	David Warnock	Liberal	John Kemmis	Conservative	Resignation to run federally	No
Lethbridge City	October 31, 1911	William Ashbury Buchanan	Liberal	John Smith Stewart	Conservative	Resignation to run federally	No
Gleichen	October 31, 1911	Archibald J. McArthur	Liberal	Harold Riley	Conservative	Death	No
Calgary	October 31, 1911	R. B. Bennett	Conservative	Thomas Tweedie	Conservative	Resignation to run federally	Yes
Macleod	October 3, 1910	Colin Genge	Liberal	Robert Patterson	Farmers*	Death	No
Gleichen	October 3, 1910	Ezra Riley	Liberal	Archibald J. McArthur	Liberal	Sought reelection in protest against the leadership of the Liberal Party	Yes
Vermilion	June 29, 1910	Archibald Campbell	Liberal	Arthur Sifton	Liberal	Resignation to provide a seat for Premier Sifton	Yes
Medicine Hat	June 29, 1910	William Finlay	Liberal	Charles Richmond Mitchell	Liberal	Resignation	Yes
Lethbridge District	June 22, 1910†	Archibald J. McLean	Independent Liberal	Archibald J. McLean	Liberal	Sought reelection upon appointment as Provincial Secretary	No
Olds	November 23, 1909	Duncan Marshall	Liberal	Duncan Marshall	Liberal	Sought reelection upon appointment as Minister of Agriculture	Yes

† Won by acclamation

*Patterson was elected with Conservative support and sat as a Conservative in the Legislature

== 1st Legislative Assembly of Alberta 1905–1909 ==
By-election	Date	Incumbent	Party	Winner	Party	Cause	Retained
Lethbridge	January 8, 1909†	William Simmons	Liberal	Donald McNabb	Labour	Resignation to run federally	No
Gleichen	December 7, 1906	Charles Stuart	Liberal	Ezra Riley	Liberal	Appointed a judge	Yes
Vermilion	July 16, 1906†	Matthew McCauley	Liberal	James Bismark Holden	Liberal	Appointed Warden of Edmonton Penitentiary	Yes
Lethbridge	April 12, 1906	Leverett DeVeber	Liberal	William Simmons	Liberal	Appointed to the Senate	Yes

† Won by acclamation

== See also ==
- List of federal by-elections in Canada
