= Wetaskiwin (disambiguation) =

Wetaskiwin is a city in Alberta, Canada.

Wetaskiwin, after the Cree word wītaskīwin-ispatinaw (ᐑᑕᐢᑮᐏᐣ ᐃᐢᐸᑎᓇᐤ), may also refer to:

- Wetaskiwin (federal electoral district), Alberta, Canada
- Wetaskiwin (provincial electoral district), Alberta, Canada
- Wetaskiwin (territorial electoral district), former territorial electoral district in the Northwest Territories, Canada
- Wetaskiwin Regional Airport, airport near Wetaskiwin, Alberta, Canada
- Wetaskiwin Regional Division No. 11, a school division in Alberta, Canada
- Wetaskiwin-Camrose, a provincial electoral district in Alberta, Canada
- County of Wetaskiwin No. 10, a county in Alberta, Canada
- HMCS Wetaskiwin (K175), a ship of the Royal Canadian Navy named after the city
