= Frank Appleby =

Frank Appleby may refer to:

- Frank Pierpoint Appleby (1913–2015), provincial level politician from Alberta, Canada
- T. Frank Appleby (1864–1924), American Republican Party politician who represented New Jersey's 3rd congressional district
