= Richard Edward Hall =

Canadian politician

Member of the Legislative Assembly of Alberta
- In office June 29, 1955 – June 18, 1959
- Preceded by: Antonio Aloisio
- Succeeded by: Antonio Aloisio
- Constituency: Athabasca

Personal details
- Born: September 17, 1907
- Died: August 19, 1977 (aged 69)
- Party: Liberal
- Occupation: theatre owner and politician

Richard Edward Hall (September 17, 1907 – August 19, 1977) was a Canadian theatre owner and provincial politician from Alberta. He served as a member of the Legislative Assembly of Alberta from 1955 to 1959, sitting with the Liberal caucus in opposition.

== Political career ==
Hall ran for a seat to the Alberta Legislature as a Liberal candidate in the electoral district of Athabasca in the 1955 Alberta general election. He defeated incumbent Antonio Alosio with second choice preferences by almost 50 votes to pick up the seat for his party. Hall placed second out of three candidates by four votes on the first count but came back to win the election.

Hall ran for a second term in office in the 1959 Alberta general election. He faced Aloisio for the second time, but was defeated in a landslide finishing a distant second place in the four-way race.

Hall ran for a seat to the House of Commons of Canada in the 1963 Canadian federal election as a federal Liberal candidate in the electoral district of Athabaska. He finished a distant second place in the four-way race losing to incumbent Jack Bigg and finishing ahead of former Alberta MLA Peter Chaba.
