= John W. Frame =

Canadian politician (1872–1932)

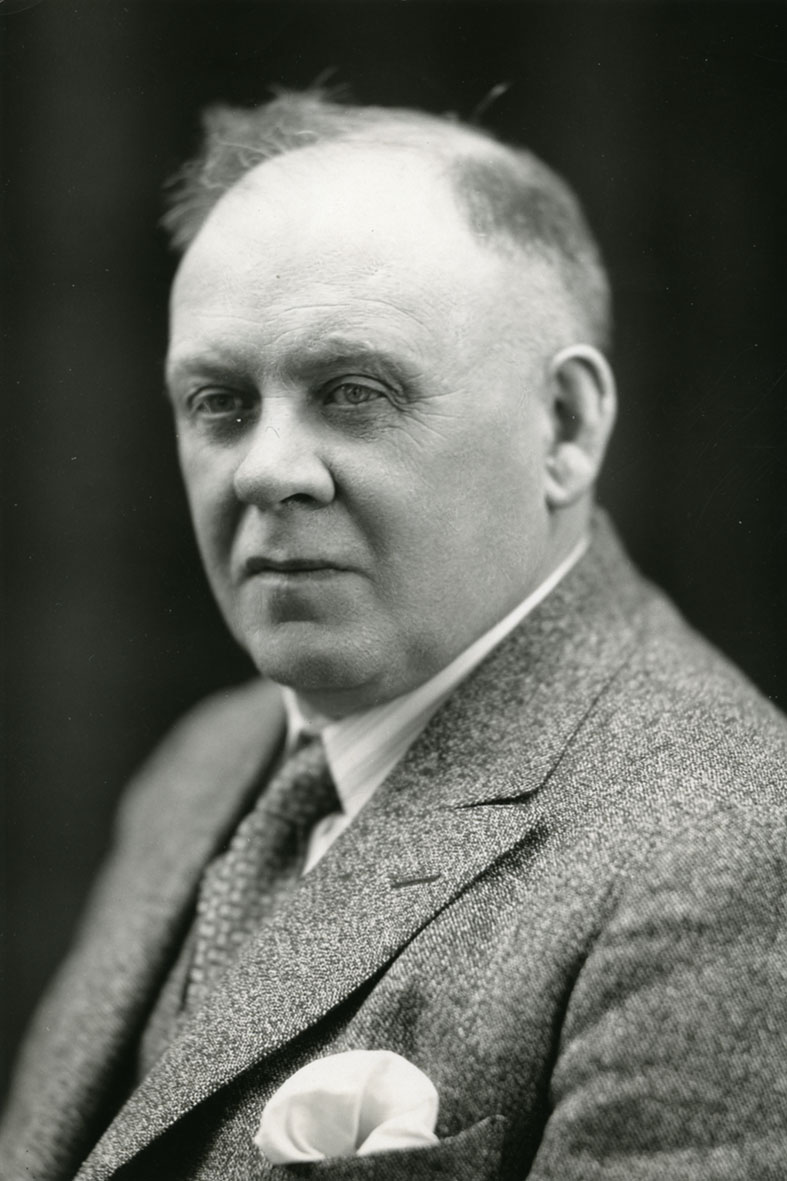

Member of the Legislative Assembly of Alberta
- In office June 28, 1926 – June 19, 1930
- Preceded by: George Mills
- Succeeded by: Frank Falconer
- Constituency: Athabasca

Personal details
- Born: 29 November 1872 Larbert, Stirlingshire, Scotland
- Died: 8 December 1932 (aged 60) Athabasca, Alberta
- Party: United Farmers
- Other political affiliations: Liberal
- Occupation: politician

John "Jock" Wadell Frame (29 November 1872 – 8 December 1932) was a politician from Alberta, Canada. He served in the Legislative Assembly of Alberta from 1926 to 1930 as a member of the Liberal caucus in opposition and later with the United Farmers caucus in government.

== Political careers ==
Frame ran for the nomination of the Liberal Party as its candidate in the electoral district of Athabasca in the 1926 Alberta general election. The nomination was held on May 28, 1926, and Frame was acclaimed as the candidate. Incumbent George Mills had protested the hastily called date, alleging that it prevented party members from the northern portion of the riding to attend the meeting. Mills ran for re-election as an independent Liberal. On election night, Frame, Mills and two other candidates each polled roughly a quarter of the vote on the first count. Frame held a small lead while Mills finished last. Frame won on the third vote count, defeating the United Farmers candidate.

Shortly before the 1930 general election Frame crossed the floor to the United Farmers caucus and was nominated as a UFA candidate. He was defeated in the election by Liberal candidate Frank Falconer.

== Later life ==
Following his loss in the 1930 general election, Frame returned to his 1,000 acre farm. Frame of died of heart failure after a brief illness on December 8, 1932.
