= Mount Côté =

Mountain in the country of Canada

- Location within Alberta Location within British Columbia Location within Canada

Highest point
- Elevation: 2,391 m (7,844 ft)
- Prominence: 422 m (1,385 ft)
- Parent peak: Bastille Mountain (2545 m)
- Listing: Mountains of Alberta; Mountains of British Columbia
- Coordinates: 53°53′00″N 120°00′03″W

Geography
- Country: Canada
- Provinces: Alberta and British Columbia
- Parent range: Front Ranges
- Topo map: NTS 93H16 Mount Sir Alexander

Mount Côté is located on the border of Alberta and British Columbia. The mountain is named for Jean Côté, a Canadian politician.

== See also ==
- List of peaks on the British Columbia–Alberta border
