= John Wingblade =

Canadian politician (1883-1984)

John Alfred Wingblade
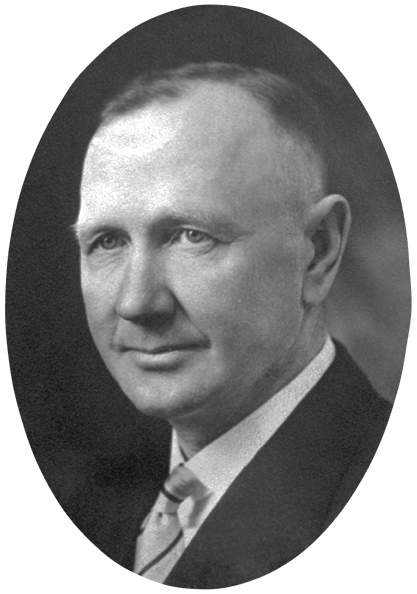

Member of the Legislative Assembly of Alberta
- In office August 22, 1935 – June 17, 1963
- Preceded by: Hugh Montgomery
- Succeeded by: Albert Strohschein
- Constituency: Wetaskiwin

Personal details
- Born: February 26, 1883 Olsburg, Kansas, U.S.
- Died: May 14, 1984 (aged 101) Wetaskiwin, Alberta, Canada
- Party: Social Credit
- Occupation: politician

John Alfred Wingblade (February 26, 1883 – May 14, 1984) was a politician from Alberta, Canada. He served in the Legislative Assembly of Alberta from 1935 to 1963 as a member of the Social Credit Party.

== Political career ==
Wingblade ran for a seat to the Alberta Legislature in the 1935 general election as the Social Credit candidate in the riding of Wetaskiwin. He won on the first ballot, defeating incumbent Liberal MLA Hugh Montgomery.

Wingblade stood for a second term in the 1940 general election. Wingblade won on the second ballot against two challengers.

Wingblade ran for a third term in the 1944 general election. Again he faced Hugh Montgomery, who ran this time as an independent, as well as two other challengers. Wingblade held his seat with a comfortable majority.

In the 1948 general election, Wingblade won a three-way battle with a larger popular vote than in the 1944 election.

In the 1952 general election, Wingblade faced three challengers, including an independent Social Credit candidate. His popular vote slipped slightly from the previous election, but he held the district with a clear majority.

The 1955 general election saw a four-way race in Wetaskiwin. Wingblade won on the second count.

Wingblade faced three challengers in the 1959 general election. He was returned to office with the largest majority and popular vote of his political career.

Wingblade retired from provincial politics at dissolution of the Assembly in 1963.
