= Gordon William Lee =

Canadian politician

Member of the Legislative Assembly of Alberta
- In office 1940–1952
- Preceded by: Clarence Tade
- Succeeded by: Antonio Aloisio
- Constituency: Athabasca

Personal details
- Born: December 12, 1894
- Died: November 12, 1964 (aged 69) Athabasca County, Alberta
- Party: Social Credit

Gordon William Lee (December 12, 1894 – November 12, 1964) was a provincial politician from Alberta, Canada. He served as a member of the Legislative Assembly of Alberta from 1940 to 1952, sitting with the Social Credit caucus in government.
