= Antonio Aloisio =

Canadian politician

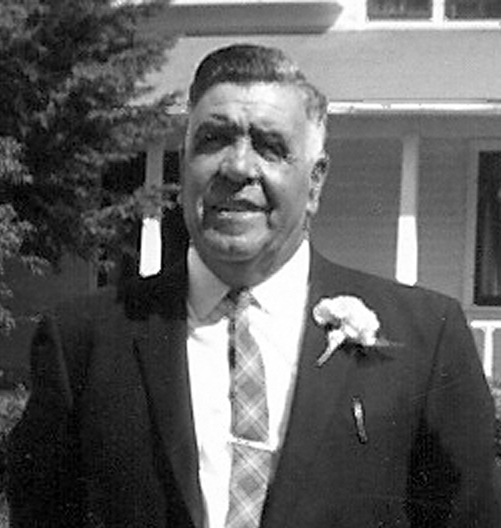

Member of the Legislative Assembly of Alberta
- In office August 5, 1952 – June 29, 1955
- Preceded by: Gordon Lee
- Succeeded by: Richard Hall
- Constituency: Athabasca
- In office June 18, 1959 – August 30, 1971
- Preceded by: Richard Hall
- Succeeded by: Frank Appleby

Personal details
- Born: November 11, 1898 San Nicandro, Italy
- Died: January 28, 1977 (aged 78) Penticton, British Columbia
- Party: Social Credit
- Spouse: Matilda (Tillie)
- Occupation: Politician

Antonio Aloisio (November 11, 1898 – January 28, 1977) was a politician from Alberta, Canada. He served in the Legislative Assembly of Alberta from 1952 to 1955 and again from 1959 to 1971 as a member of the Social Credit caucus.

== Political career ==
Aloisio first ran for a seat to the Alberta Legislature as a Social Credit candidate in the 1952 general election. He won a comfortable majority to hold the Athabasca electoral district for his party.

He ran for a second term in the 1955 general election and was defeated by Liberal candidate Richard Hall. He led on the first count but was defeated on second choice preferences. He regained the seat for Social Credit in the 1959 election, defeating Hall by a large majority.

In the 1963 general election, Aloisio faced a strong challenge from provincial Liberal leader Dave Hunter, but managed to hang on to his seat. Hunter and Aloisio faced each other again in the 1967 election. Aloisio held the seat with an increase in his vote and Hunter finished a distant third.

Aloisio retired from the legislature at dissolution in 1971.
