= Evert Sparks =

Canadian politician (1879-1972)

Evert Ellsworth Sparks
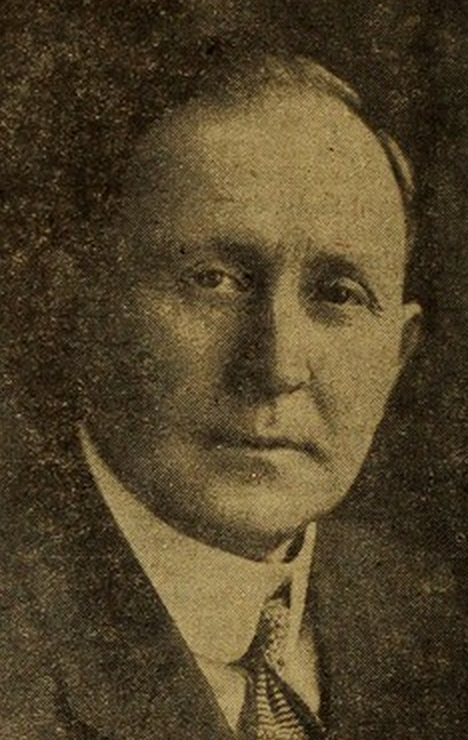

Member of the Legislative Assembly of Alberta
- In office July 18, 1921 – June 19, 1930
- Preceded by: Hugh John Montgomery
- Succeeded by: Hugh John Montgomery
- Constituency: Wetaskiwin

Personal details
- Born: September 10, 1879 Mound Valley, Kansas
- Died: May 11, 1972 (aged 92) Chester, Montana
- Party: United Farmers
- Occupation: politician

Evert Ellsworth Sparks (September 10, 1879 – May 11, 1972) was a politician from Alberta, Canada. He served in the Legislative Assembly of Alberta from 1921 to 1930 as a member of the United Farmers caucus in government.

== Political career ==
Sparks first ran for a seat to the Alberta Legislature in the 1921 general election, as a United Farmers candidate in a two-way race against Liberal incumbent Hugh John Montgomery in the electoral district of Wetaskiwin. He won by a comfortable margin to pick up the district for his party.

In the 1926 Alberta general election, Sparks faced Montgomery again and defeated him on the second count.

In the 1930 Alberta general election Sparks faced Montgomery once again; this time he was defeated by his predecessor.
