= Anthony Rosenroll =

Anthony Sigwart de Rosenroll
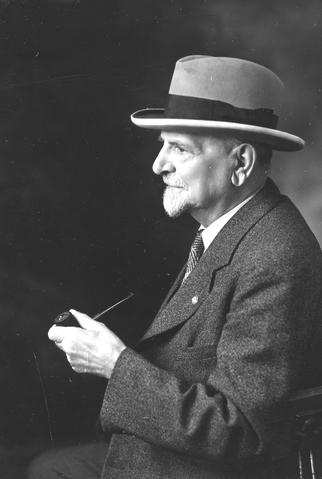
- Portrait of Rosenroll taken in 1936

Member of the Legislative Assembly of Alberta
- In office November 9, 1905 – March 22, 1909
- Preceded by: New district
- Succeeded by: Charles H. Olin
- Constituency: Wetaskiwin

Member of the Legislative Assembly of the Northwest Territories
- In office November 4, 1898 – September 1, 1905
- Preceded by: New district
- Succeeded by: District abolished
- Constituency: Wetaskiwin

Personal details
- Born: December 4, 1857 Castellammare di Stabia, Kingdom of the Two Sicilies
- Died: May 8, 1945 (aged 87) Moose Jaw, Saskatchewan
- Resting place: Wetaskiwin
- Party: Alberta Liberal Party
- Spouse: Ida Eberhard
- Children: Arthur Sylvester (1896-1971); Edgar (1897-1968); Richelda (1898-1944)
- Occupation: Businessman

Anthony Sigwart de Rosenroll (December 4, 1857 – May 8, 1945) was a politician and businessman in the Canadian province of Alberta. Born in the Kingdom of the Two Sicilies to a family of noble Swiss heritage, he spent his early adulthood in the British colonies of Australia and New Zealand before settling in Canada in 1895. He became a prominent resident of Wetaskiwin, and was acclaimed as its representative to the Legislative Assembly of the Northwest Territories in 1898 and 1902. In Alberta's first provincial election, he was elected as a Liberal to the Legislative Assembly of Alberta, where he remained until 1909. He remained active in business until 1940, and died in 1945 of pneumonia.

== Early life ==
De Rosenroll was born December 4, 1857, in Castellamare, Kingdom of the Two Sicilies, to Rudolph and Margaret de Rosenroll. He was descended from Swiss nobility on his father's side, though his line had been absent from Switzerland since 1806. When Anthony was three years old, his father was killed at Palermo while fighting for Giuseppe Garibaldi during the Expedition of the Thousand; his family took refuge in Malta for much of the rest of the rebellion.

Returning to Italy, de Rosenroll was taught by tutors in Naples, and ultimately graduated from the University of Naples in civil engineering. He spent several years working for the British colonial governments in what is now Australia and New Zealand in this capacity, before voyaging to the United States to visit his sister. From there he came to Winnipeg in 1895, ultimately becoming one of the first residents of Wetaskiwin in 1896. There he married Ida Eberhard, with whom he had three children: Arthur (1896–1971—born in Ollon because of his father's distrust of the young Canadian medical profession), Edgar (1897–1968), and Richelda (1898–1944).

De Rosenroll involved himself in many business ventures. The first of these was a ranching enterprise, in which he initially partnered with Scandinavian settler Thomas R. Jevne and later founded the Rosenroll Ranch near Hay Lakes. Other ventures included the Rosenroll Lumber Co. Ltd., Rosenroll Dairy/Wetaskiwin Creamery, a coal mine, and Rosenroll Ltd., which dealt in real estate and insurance.

De Rosenroll was a prominent citizen of his young and growing town. In 1896, he was made a Justice of the Peace and a notary public. Wetaskiwin's Rosenroll Street and nearby Rosenroll were named in his honour (though the former was eventually re-designated with a number, and the latter was renamed to Bittern Lake in 1910). He was an active Presbyterian and a Mason.

== Political career and later life ==
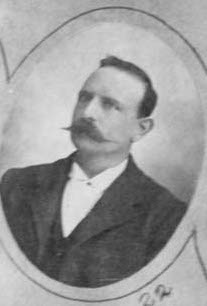
Anthony Rosenroll's photo from the Legislative Assembly of the Northwest Territories in 1899

De Rosenroll's prominence was such that, when Wetaskiwin received a seat in the Legislative Assembly of the Northwest Territories beginning with the 1898 election, he was acclaimed to it. He was re-elected by acclamation during the 1902 election. When Alberta became a province in 1905, de Rosenroll ran in its first election in Wetaskiwin as the Liberal candidate. He defeated Conservative R.W. Angus handily. When the government introduced a bill increasing the size of the legislature from sixteen seats to 41, de Rosenroll argued that not enough of the new seats were going to rural regions. He did not seek re-election in the 1909 election.

In 1909 he was endorsed by the German-speaking population of Strathcona as the Liberal candidate for the House of Commons of Canada in an upcoming by-election. Whether he declined their entreaties or was defeated is unclear, but the nominated Liberal candidate was James McCrie Douglas, who was elected by acclamation.

In his later life, de Rosenroll devoted himself to writing a family history, completed in 1936. He retired from his business activities in 1940, leaving them to his son Edgar. He subsequently moved to Moose Jaw, where his son Arthur lived. In 1944 he contracted pneumonia, and in 1945 he died in Moose Jaw at the age of 87. He is buried in a Wetaskiwin cemetery.

== Electoral record ==
1898 North-West Territories general election: Wetaskiwin
Party	Candidate	Votes
Independent	Anthony Rosenroll	Acclaimed

1902 North-West Territories general election: Wetaskiwin
Party	Candidate	Votes
Liberal–Conservative	Anthony Rosenroll	Acclaimed

1905 Alberta general election: Wetaskiwin
Party	Candidate	Votes	%
Liberal	A.L. Rosenroll [sic]	552	66.51%
Conservative	R.W. Angus	278	33.49%
Total		830	
Liberal pickup new district.			
Source(s) Source: "Wetaskiwin Official Results 1905 Alberta general election". Alberta Heritage Community Foundation.
