= Frank Falconer =

Canadian politician

Frank Robert Falconer

Member of the Legislative Assembly of Alberta
- In office June 19, 1930 – August 22, 1935
- Preceded by: John Frame
- Succeeded by: Clarence Tade
- Constituency: Athabasca

Personal details
- Born: January 25, 1883 Wilton, North Dakota, U.S.
- Died: August 3, 1970 (aged 87) Edmonton, Alberta, Canada
- Party: Liberal
- Occupation: politician

Frank Robert Falconer (January 25, 1883 – August 1970) was a provincial politician from Alberta, Canada. He served as a member of the Legislative Assembly of Alberta from 1930 to 1935 sitting with the Liberal caucus in opposition.

== Political career ==
Falconer ran for a seat to the Alberta Legislature in the 1930 Alberta general election as a Liberal candidate in the electoral district of Athabasca. He defeated incumbent John Frame in a closely contested race.

Falconer ran for a second term in the 1935 Alberta general election. He was defeated by Social Credit candidate Clarence Tade finishing second in the field of three candidates.
