= William Bredin =

Canadian politician

William Fletcher Bredin
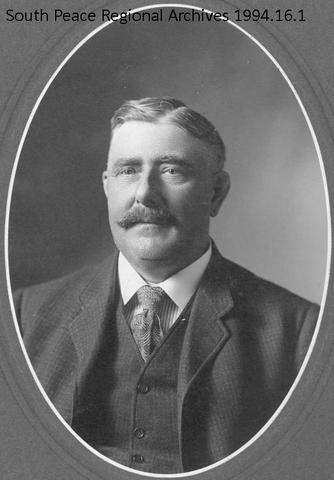

Member of the Legislative Assembly of Alberta
- In office November 9, 1905 – March 22, 1909
- Preceded by: New district
- Succeeded by: Jean Côté
- Constituency: Athabasca

Personal details
- Born: 1862 Stormont Count, Canada West
- Died: December 30, 1942 (aged 80)
- Party: Liberal
- Spouse: Anna Brown Marsh
- Occupation: Farmer

William Fletcher Bredin (1862 – 1942) was a Canadian pioneer businessman and politician. He intermittently farmed and operated businesses in the Canadian West and served as Liberal MLA in the Alberta Legislature from 1905 to 1909.

Born in Stormont County, Canada West he went west to Winnipeg where he farmed with his father near Winnipeg. He moved to the U.S. and provided railway ties to the Northern Pacific Railway. Liver-Eating Johnson advised him to join his brother who was farming in Edmonton.

In 1882 he went north on the Whoop-up Trail to Calgary then north on the Calgary-Edmonton Trail to Edmonton, arriving shortly after his brother died. He took over the homestead and was joined by his father. He spent some time in Calgary working in a coal mine and settled at Red Deer Crossing in 1883, where he took over a claim from Esias Myers. He sold his Edmonton farm in 1884 and prospected for valuable minerals in the Rockies.

In Calgary, he opened a store with R. Steen, engaged in freighting between Calgary and Edmonton, and was active with the Oddfellows. He also established the Climax coal mine, 22 miles (35 km) southwest of Calgary.

He established the Buffalo Lakes Trading Post in the area later known as Lamerton in 1892, when there were only seven settlers in the area. He sold the post to Joe Edminson in 1895.

Around 1897, he travelled by boat down the Athabasca River to the Mackenzie River. He opened a chain of fur trading posts with James Cornwall and Alexander Monkman in the Peace River Country; they sold these to the Revillon Frères in 1906. In 1907 he claimed to have lived "all over the Northwest pretty well".

He ran as candidate in the first election after Alberta became a province in 1905. Running as a Liberal in Athabasca, he took the seat by acclamation. (He was the only MLA acclaimed in that election.) In office, he advocated for a railway to be built into the northeast corner of the new province. He also gave testimony to a select committee of the Senate of Canada in 1907 about agricultural conditions in northwest Canada, drawing on his experience living and travelling in the area, including his boat trip down the Athabasca of ten years before. In his testimony, he estimated that the "good land north of Edmonton, east of the Rocky Mountains" amounted to at least 100,000,000 acres (40,000,000 ha).

He married Anna Brown Marsh in Clarksburg, Ontario in September 1907.

Bredin sought re-election in the 1909 election, but was defeated by fellow Liberal Jean Côté. He sought to return to office in the 1913 election as an independent Liberal in Peace River. He finished a distant third of three candidates. (His candidacy may have secured the seat to the Conservative candidate as it likely split the Liberal vote and the Conservative got the seat although he did not receive a majority of the votes.)

After leaving office, Bredin returned to farming and fur trading around Lesser Slave Lake. During the 1920s, he served as a director on the executive of the United Farmers of Alberta; in this capacity, at the January 1921 UFA convention he moved a successful resolution to protest a new pelt tax levied by the Liberal government, as many northern farmers supplemented their incomes by trapping and he himself augmented his farming by trading in furs.

William Bredin died on December 30, 1942, at the age of 80.

== Electoral record ==
1913 Alberta general election results (Peace River)		Turnout 82.2%	
Conservative	Alphaeus Patterson	475	49.53%
Liberal	William Archibald Rae	437	45.57%
Independent Liberal	William Fletcher Bredin	47	4.90%
1909 Alberta general election results (Athabasca)		Turnout 62.3%	
Liberal	Jean Côté	230	59.59%
Liberal	William Fletcher Bredin	149	38.60%
Conservative	V. Maurice	7	1.81%
1905 Alberta general election results (Athabasca)		Turnout N/A	
Liberal	William Fletcher Bredin	Acclaimed	
