= Grouard (electoral district) =

Defunct provincial electoral district in Alberta, Canada

Alberta electoral district

Defunct provincial electoral district
- Legislature: Legislative Assembly of Alberta
- District created: 1913
- District abolished: 1971
- First contested: 1913
- Last contested: 1967

Grouard was a provincial electoral district in Alberta, Canada, mandated to return a single member to the Legislative Assembly of Alberta from 1913 to 1971.

== History ==
=== Boundary history ===
Grouard was created from the southwest quarter of Athabasca in 1913, centred on the small community of Grouard. Its main population centres soon became High Prairie and Falher.It contained several Franco-Albertan communities. Its boundaries saw minor adjustments during its history, but it retained a similar size and shape until it was abolished in 1971.

It was abolished in 1971, with the northeast parts going to Lesser Slave Lake and the southwest parts becoming Smoky River.

=== Electoral system ===
From 1924 to 1956, the district used instant-runoff voting to elect its MLA.

=== Representation history ===
Members of the Legislative Assembly for Grouard
Assembly	Years	Member	Party
See Athabasca 1905-1913
3rd	1913–1917	Jean Côté	Liberal
4th	1917–1921	Jean Côté	Liberal
5th	1921–1923	Jean Côté	Liberal
5th	1923–1924	Vacant	
5th	1924–1926	Leonidas Giroux	Liberal
6th	1926–1930	Leonidas Giroux	Liberal
7th	1930–1935	Leonidas Giroux	Liberal
8th	1935–1936	Leonidas Giroux	Liberal
8th	1936	Vacant	
8th	1936-1940	Joseph Tremblay	Liberal
9th	1940–1944	Joseph Tremblay	Liberal
10th	1944–1948	William Fallow	Social Credit
10th	1948	Vacant	
11th	1948–1951	John Wood	Social Credit
11th	1951	Vacant	
11th	1951–1952	Joseph Desfosses	Liberal
12th	1952–1955	Joseph Desfosses	Liberal
13th	1955–1959	Joseph Desfosses	Liberal
14th	1959–1963	Roy Ells	Social Credit
15th	1963–1967	Roy Ells	Social Credit
16th	1967–1971	Roy Ells	Social Credit
See Lesser Slave Lake after 1971 and Smoky River 1971-1993

Grouard was one of the friendliest ridings for the Alberta Liberal Party, and in its 58-year history, never once voted out an incumbent MLA.

Incumbent Athabasca MLA Jean Côté decided to run in the new riding of Grouard when it was created in 1913, easily defeating his Conservative challenger. He won re-election twice, and was appointed to the Senate on the advice of Prime Minister Mackenzie King in 1923, vacating his seat.

The resulting by-election was won handily by another Liberal, Leonidas Giroux. He was re-elected three times, defending his seat even in 1935, which saw every other seat in rural Alberta swept up by the nascent Social Credit Party of William Aberhart. However, Giroux died in office the following year.

The by-election in fall 1936 was again won by a Liberal, Joseph Tremblay, who narrowly defeated his Social Credit rival. Tremblay won a razor-thin re-election in 1940, one of only two Liberal candidates across the province in that election, and decided to retire when the legislature was dissolved.

The Liberals did not field a single candidate in 1944. With Social Credit candidate William Fallow finally capturing Grouard for the government, this ended the longest streak for any party in Alberta's tumultuous early politics. Fallow also died in office in 1948, but no by-election was held, as a general election took place that year.

Social Credit won the riding for a second time, with John Wood gaining a comfortable victory on the second count. He resigned his post before the term finished, necessitating another by-election in 1951.

Liberal Joseph Desfosses narrowly won the riding back for his party, serving with the revived opposition party until he chose to retire in 1959.

Grouard's final MLA was Roy Ells, who sat with the governing Social Credit for three terms until the riding was abolished in 1971.

== Election results ==
=== 1910s ===
1913 Alberta general election
Party	Candidate	Votes	%
Liberal	Jean Côté	347	63.32%
Conservative	O. Travers	201	36.68%
Total valid votes		548	
Rejected, spoiled and declined		-	
Electors / Turnout		777	70.53%
Liberal pickup new district.			

1917 Alberta general election
Party	Candidate	Votes	%	±%
Liberal	Jean Côté	688	70.71%	+7.39%
Conservative	Eugene Gravel	285	29.29%	-7.39%
Total valid votes		973		
Rejected, spoiled and declined		-		
Electors / Turnout		1,265	76.92%	+6.39%
Liberal hold		Swing		+7.39%

Following the convention at the time, Côté stood in a by-election upon being named to cabinet. However, since no other candidates contested it, he was acclaimed.

Alberta provincial by-election, October 21, 1918 Ministerial by-election upon Jean Côté's appointment as Provincial Secretary
Party	Candidate	Votes	%	±%
Liberal	Jean Côté	Acclaimed	–	–
Total		N/A	–	–
Rejected, spoiled and declined		N/A	–	–
Eligible electors / turnout		N/A	N/A	–
Liberal hold		Swing		–
Source(s) "By-elections". Elections Alberta.

=== 1920s ===
1921 Alberta general election
Party	Candidate	Votes	%	±%
Liberal	Jean Côté	963	57.84%	-12.87%
United Farmers	Henry George Dimsdale	702	42.16%	
Total valid votes		1,665		
Rejected, spoiled and declined		-		
Electors / Turnout		2,362	70.49%	-6.43%
Liberal hold		Swing		-27.52%

Alberta provincial by-election, July 11, 1924 Upon the appointment of Jean Côté to the Senate of Canada
Party	Candidate	Votes	%	±%
Liberal	Leonidas Giroux	1,085	70.36%	+12.52%
United Farmers	J.M. Cull	457	29.64%	-12.52%
Total valid votes		1,542	–	–
Rejected, spoiled and declined		–	–	–
Electors / turnout		–	–	–
Liberal hold		Swing		+12.52%
Source(s) "By-elections". Elections Alberta.

1926 Alberta general election
Party	Candidate	Votes	%	±%
Liberal	Leonidas Giroux	1,224	75.05%	+4.69%
Conservative	Henry George Dimsdale	407	24.95%	
Total valid votes		1,631		
Rejected, spoiled and declined		64		
Electors / Turnout		2,511	67.50%	-
Liberal hold		Swing		-10.13%

=== 1930s ===
1930 Alberta general election
Party	Candidate	Votes	%	±%
Liberal	Leonidas Giroux	1,706	62.65%	-12.40%
United Farmers	Jean Field	1,017	37.35%	
Total valid votes		2,723		
Rejected, spoiled and declined		6		
Electors / Turnout		3,988	68.43%	+0.93%
Liberal hold		Swing		-24.88%

1935 Alberta general election
Party	Candidate	Votes	%	±%
Liberal	Leonidas Giroux	2,272	55.89%	-6.76%
Social Credit	R.A. Pelletier	1,447	35.60%	
United Farmers	E.E. Requier	346	8.51%	-28.84%
Total valid votes		4,065		
Rejected, spoiled and declined		135		
Electors / Turnout		5,378	78.10%	+9.67%
Liberal hold		Swing		-21.18%

Alberta provincial by-election, December 7, 1936 Upon the death of Leonidas Giroux
Party	Candidate	Votes	%	±%
Liberal	Joseph Tremblay	1,668	52.26%	-3.63%
Social Credit	W. J. Desrosiers	1,524	47.74%	+12.14%
Total valid votes		3,192	–	–
Rejected, spoiled and declined		N/A	–	–
Electors / turnout		N/A	N/A	–
Liberal hold		Swing		-7.89%
Source(s) "By-elections". Elections Alberta.

=== 1940s ===
1940 Alberta general election
Party	Candidate	Votes	%	±%
Liberal	Joseph Tremblay	1,747	39.05%	-13.21%
Social Credit	J.A. Maurice	1,703	38.06%	-9.68%
Co-operative Commonwealth	Michael O'Grady	1,024	22.89%	
Second Count
Liberal	Joseph Tremblay	1,965	50.05%	+11.00%
Social Credit	J.A. Maurice	1,961	49.95%	+11.89%
No second preference		548		
Total valid votes		4,474		
Rejected, spoiled and declined		197		
Electors / Turnout		7,528	62.05%	-
Liberal hold		Swing		-1.77%

First-count swing is calculated from the 1936 by-election, while second-count swing reflects increase in vote share from the first count.

1944 Alberta general election
Party	Candidate	Votes	%	±%
Social Credit	William Fallow	2,612	57.29%	+19.23%
Co-operative Commonwealth	Mike O'Grady	1,560	34.22%	+11.33%
Labor–Progressive	Merie Evanuk	387	8.49%	
Total valid votes		4,559		
Rejected, spoiled and declined		168		
Electors / Turnout		7,019	67.35%	+5.30%
Social Credit gain from Liberal		Swing		+3.95%

1948 Alberta general election
Party	Candidate	Votes	%	±%
Social Credit	John Wood	2,493	44.58%	-12.71%
Liberal	André Dechêne	1,850	33.08%	
Co-operative Commonwealth	D.B. Fraser	1,249	22.34%	-11.88%
Second Count
Social Credit	John Wood	2,717	58.63%	+14.05%
Liberal	André Dechêne	1,917	41.37%	+8.29%
No second preference		958		
Total valid votes		5,592		
Rejected, spoiled and declined		376		
Electors / Turnout		7,881	75.73%	+8.38%
Social Credit hold		Swing		-22.90%

=== 1950s ===
Alberta provincial by-election, June 21, 1951 Upon the resignation of John Wood
Party	Candidate	Votes	%	±%
Liberal	Joseph Desfosses	2,275	44.16%	+11.08%
Social Credit	D. McLaughlin	2,197	42.64%	-1.94%
Co-operative Commonwealth	C.R. Clark	680	13.20%	-9.14%
Total valid votes		5,152	–	–
Rejected, spoiled and declined		N/A	–	–
Electors / turnout		N/A	N/A	–
Liberal gain from Social Credit		Swing		+6.51%
Source(s) "By-elections". Elections Alberta.

1952 Alberta general election
Party	Candidate	Votes	%	±%
Liberal	Joseph Desfosses	2,358	42.54%	-1.62%
Social Credit	Joseph St. Arnaud	2,234	40.30%	-2.34%
Co-operative Commonwealth	Charlton R. Clark	951	17.16%	+3.96%
Second Count
Liberal	Joseph Desfosses	2,558	51.54%	+9.00%
Social Credit	Joseph St. Arnaud	2,405	48.46%	+8.16%
No second preference		580		
Total valid votes		5,543		
Rejected, spoiled and declined		335		
Electors / Turnout		8,974	65.50%	-
Liberal hold		Swing		+0.36%

1955 Alberta general election
Party	Candidate	Votes	%	±%
Liberal	Joseph Desfosses	2,855	49.70%	+7.16%
Social Credit	Fred Bullen	2,319	40.37%	+0.07%
Co-operative Commonwealth	Charlton R. Clark	571	9.94%	-7.22%
Second Count
Liberal	Joseph Desfosses	3,026	55.41%	+5.71%
Social Credit	Fred Bullen	2,435	44.59%	+4.22%
No second preference		284		
Total valid votes		5,745		
Rejected, spoiled and declined		510		
Electors / Turnout		9,271	67.47%	+1.97%
Liberal hold		Swing		+3.55%

1959 Alberta general election
Party	Candidate	Votes	%	±%
Social Credit	Roy Ells	3,727	57.23%	+16.86%
Liberal	Paul Maisonneuve	1,476	22.67%	-27.03%
Progressive Conservative	Paul Soulodre	1,309	20.10%	
Total valid votes		6,512		
Rejected, spoiled and declined		25		
Electors / Turnout		9,020	72.47%	+5.00%
Social Credit gain from Liberal		Swing		+21.95%

=== 1960s ===
1963 Alberta general election
Party	Candidate	Votes	%	±%
Social Credit	Roy Ells	3,832	62.81%	+5.58%
Liberal	Gunner Wahlstrom	1,595	26.14%	+3.47%
New Democratic	Clifford Tollefson	674	11.05%	
Total valid votes		6,101		
Rejected, spoiled and declined		42		
Electors / Turnout		9,169	67.00%	-5.47%
Social Credit hold		Swing		+1.06%

1967 Alberta general election
Party	Candidate	Votes	%	±%
Social Credit	Roy Ells	3,363	51.30%	-11.51%
New Democratic	Stan Daniels	2,207	33.67%	+22.62%
Liberal	Gunner Wahlstrom	985	15.03%	-11.11%
Total valid votes		6,555		
Rejected, spoiled and declined		36		
Electors / Turnout		10,323	63.85%	-8.62%
Social Credit hold		Swing		-17.07%

== Plebiscite results ==
=== 1957 liquor plebiscite ===
1957 Alberta liquor plebiscite results: Grouard
Question A: Do you approve additional types of outlets for the sale of beer, wine and spirituous liquor subject to a local vote?
Ballot choice	Votes	%
Yes	1,388	69.99%
No	595	30.01%
Total votes	1,983	100%
Rejected, spoiled and declined	48	
8,426 eligible electors, turnout 24.10%

On October 30, 1957, a stand-alone plebiscite was held province wide in all 50 of the then current provincial electoral districts in Alberta. The government decided to consult Alberta voters to decide on liquor sales and mixed drinking after a divisive debate in the legislature. The plebiscite was intended to deal with the growing demand for reforming antiquated liquor control laws.

The plebiscite was conducted in two parts. Question A, asked in all districts, asked the voters if the sale of liquor should be expanded in Alberta, while Question B, asked in a handful of districts within the corporate limits of Calgary and Edmonton, asked if men and women should be allowed to drink together in establishments.

Province wide Question A of the plebiscite passed in 33 of the 50 districts while Question B passed in all five districts. Grouard voted in favour of the proposal with a landslide majority. Voter turnout in the district was the lowest in the province, at half the province wide average of 46%.

Official district returns were released to the public on December 31, 1957. The Social Credit government in power at the time did not consider the results binding. However the results of the vote led the government to repeal all existing liquor legislation and introduce an entirely new Liquor Act.

Municipal districts lying inside electoral districts that voted against the plebiscite were designated Local Option Zones by the Alberta Liquor Control Board and considered effective dry zones. Business owners who wanted a licence had to petition for a binding municipal plebiscite in order to be granted a licence.

== See also ==
- List of Alberta provincial electoral districts
- Canadian provincial electoral districts
