= Charles H. Olin =

Swedish-Canadian politician

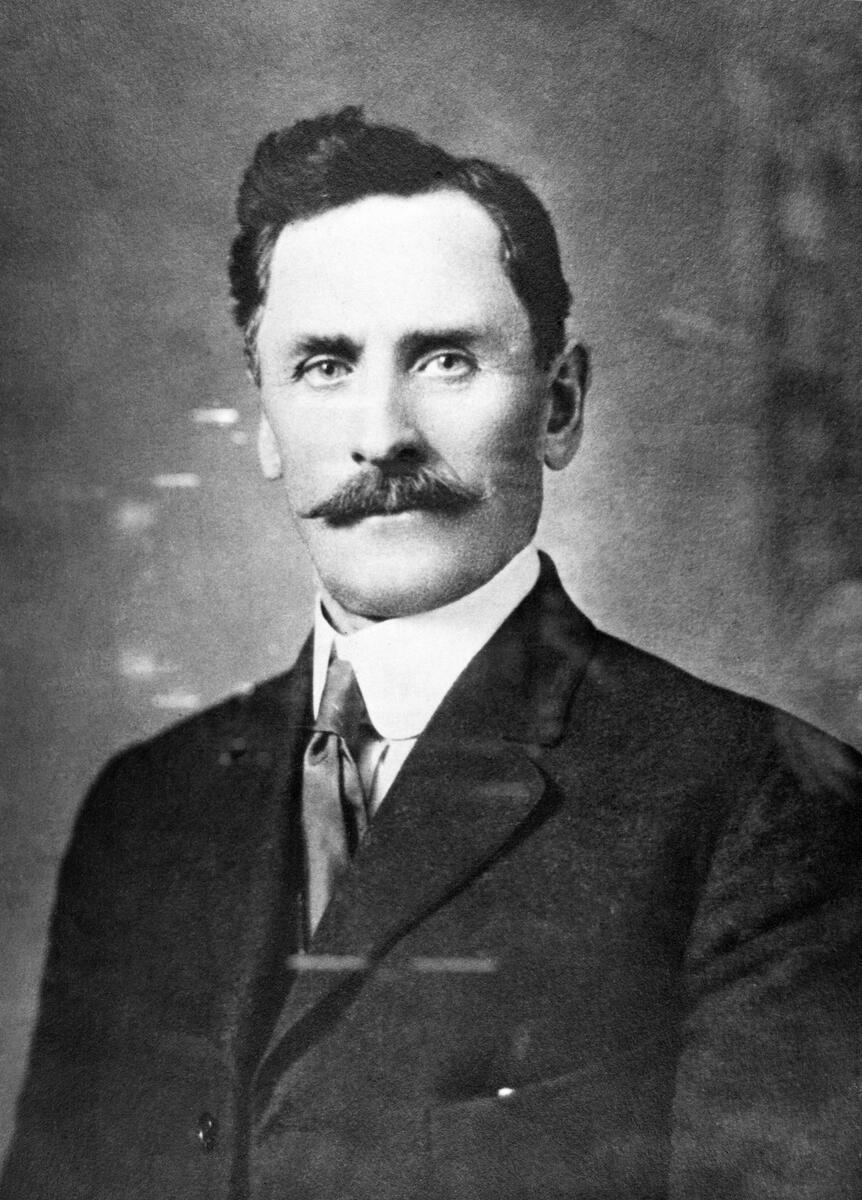

Member of the Legislative Assembly of Alberta
- In office March 22, 1909 – October 3, 1914
- Preceded by: Anthony Rosenroll
- Succeeded by: Hugh John Montgomery
- Constituency: Wetaskiwin

Personal details
- Born: August 31, 1867 Västergötland, Sweden
- Died: October 4, 1914 (aged 47) Wetaskiwin, Alberta, Canada
- Party: Liberal
- Children: three
- Occupation: farmer

Charles Herman Olin (August 31, 1867 – October 4, 1914) was a Swedish-Canadian politician from Alberta.

Olin was born in Westergothland, Sweden to Olof and Sharlotte Olin. Olin emigrated from Sweden to the Nebraska, United States in 1886 and moved to Alberta, Canada in 1892.

He married Matilda Bengstone on November 17, 1894, and together had three children. Olin worked as an Inspector of Public Works and Bridge Foreman from 1898 to 1909. Olin served on the Wetaskiwin City Council and was the President of the Liberal Association of Wetaskiwin.

He was first elected to the Alberta Legislature in the 1909 Alberta general election as the new Liberal member for Wetaskiwin after long serving incumbent member Anthony Rosenroll did not seek another term in office.

Olin was re-elected to a second term in the 1913 Alberta general election, but he died a bit more than a year into that term after a month long illness on October 4, 1914.
