= Joseph Desfosses =

Canadian politician

Joseph R. Desfosses

Member of the Legislative Assembly of Alberta
- In office June 21, 1951 – June 18, 1959
- Preceded by: John Wood
- Succeeded by: Roy Ells
- Constituency: Grouard

Personal details
- Born: November 3, 1897
- Died: April 1, 1980 (aged 82)
- Party: Liberal
- Occupation: politician

Joseph Arthur Roméo Desfossés (November 3, 1897 – April 1, 1980) was a provincial politician from Alberta, Canada. He served as a member of the Legislative Assembly of Alberta from 1951 to 1959 sitting with the Liberal caucus in opposition.

== Political career ==
Desfosses ran for a seat to the Alberta Legislature in a by-election held on June 21, 1951, in the Grouard electoral district. He defeated two other candidates in a hotly contested race on second vote preferences to pick up the seat for the provincial Liberals.

Just over a year later Defosses ran for a second term in office in the 1952 Alberta general election. He held the district winning a small plurality on the first vote count, and hanging to win the three-way race on the second vote count by 150 votes.

Defosses ran for a third term in the 1955 Alberta general election. He won a larger popular vote, but was unable to secure a majority. On the second vote count Defossess easily held his seat defeating two other candidates.

Defosses retired from the legislature at dissolution of the assembly in 1959.
