= Joseph Tremblay =

Canadian politician

Member of the Legislative Assembly of Alberta
- In office 1936–1944
- Preceded by: Leonidas Giroux
- Succeeded by: William Fallow
- Constituency: Grouard

Personal details
- Born: September 21, 1899 Chicoutimi, Quebec
- Died: November 26, 1990 (aged 91)
- Party: Liberal

Joseph Harry René Tremblay (September 21, 1899 – November 26, 1990) was a provincial politician from Alberta, Canada. He served as a member of the Legislative Assembly of Alberta from 1940 to 1944, sitting as a Liberal member from the constituency of Grouard.

During the Second World War, he served as an officer in the Loyal Edmonton Regiment, rising to the rank of lieutenant-colonel. J.H Tremblay left the Canadian Army in October 1945 to work for the Commercial Intelligence Service, with the Canadian Department of Trade and Commerce in Ottawa.

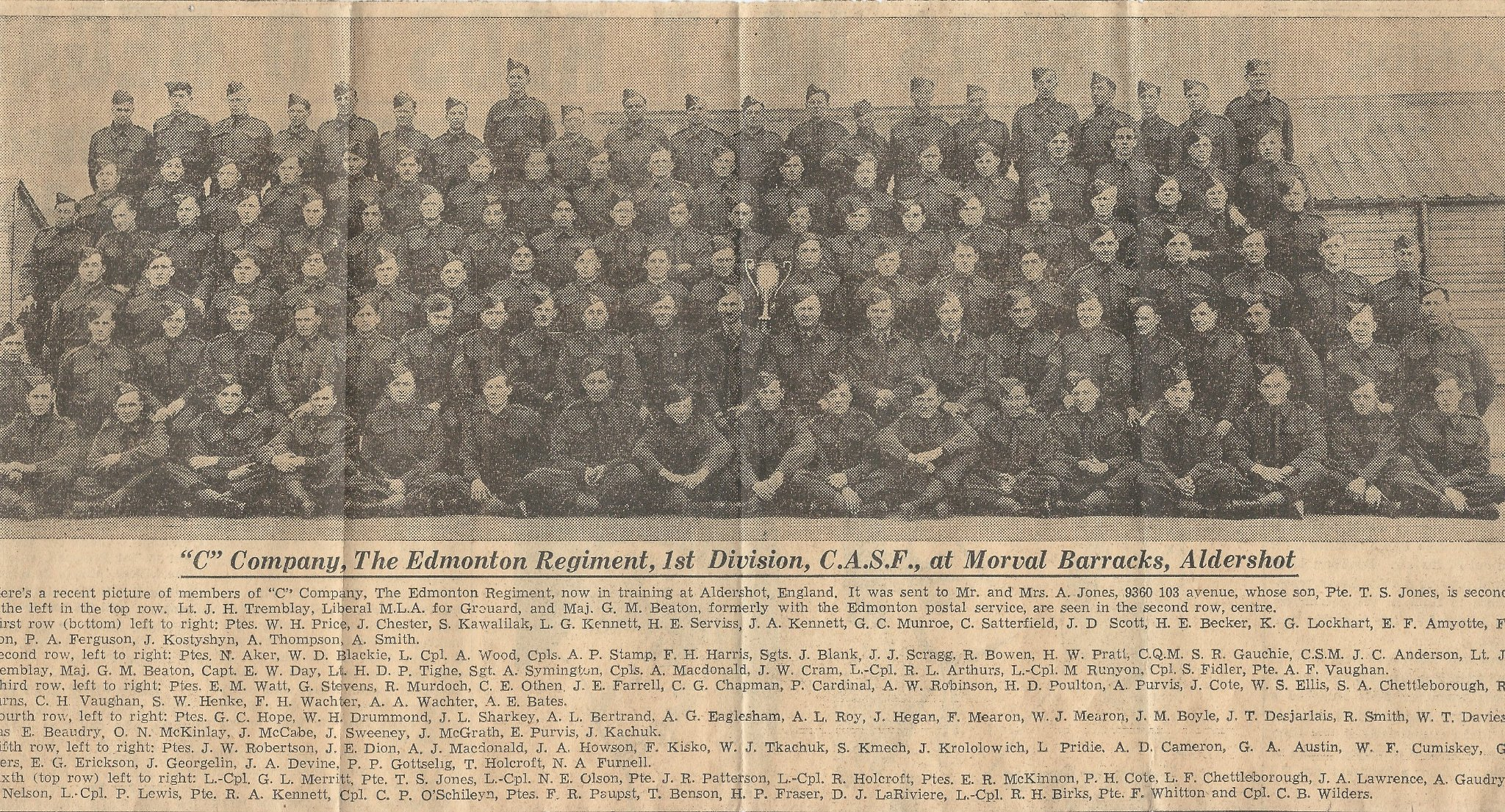
