= Charles Cathmer Ross =

Canadian politician

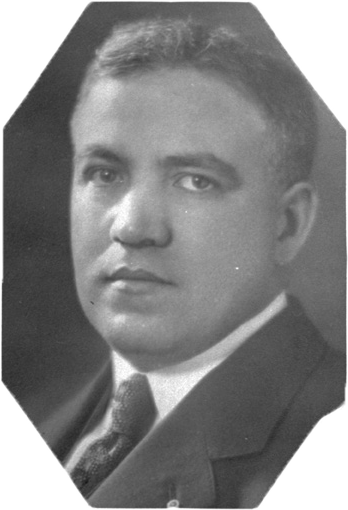

Member of the Legislative Assembly of Alberta
- In office 1935–1938
- Preceded by: Clarence Tade
- Succeeded by: Clarence Tade
- Constituency: Athabasca

Personal details
- Born: June 14, 1884 Ottawa, Ontario, Canada
- Died: September 12, 1938 (aged 54) Vancouver, British Columbia, Canada
- Party: Social Credit

Charles Cathmer Ross (June 14, 1884 – September 12, 1938) was a provincial politician from Alberta, Canada. He served as a member of the Legislative Assembly of Alberta from 1935 to his death in 1938, sitting with the Social Credit caucus in government. He was Minister of Lands and Mines in the government from September 3, 1935, to January 5, 1937. Appointed to cabinet without a seat in the legislature, he ran in a 1935 by-election, for which Athabasca incumbent Clarence Tade resigned his seat for. Ross died in office of heart disease in 1938.
