= Frank Pierpoint Appleby =

Canadian politician

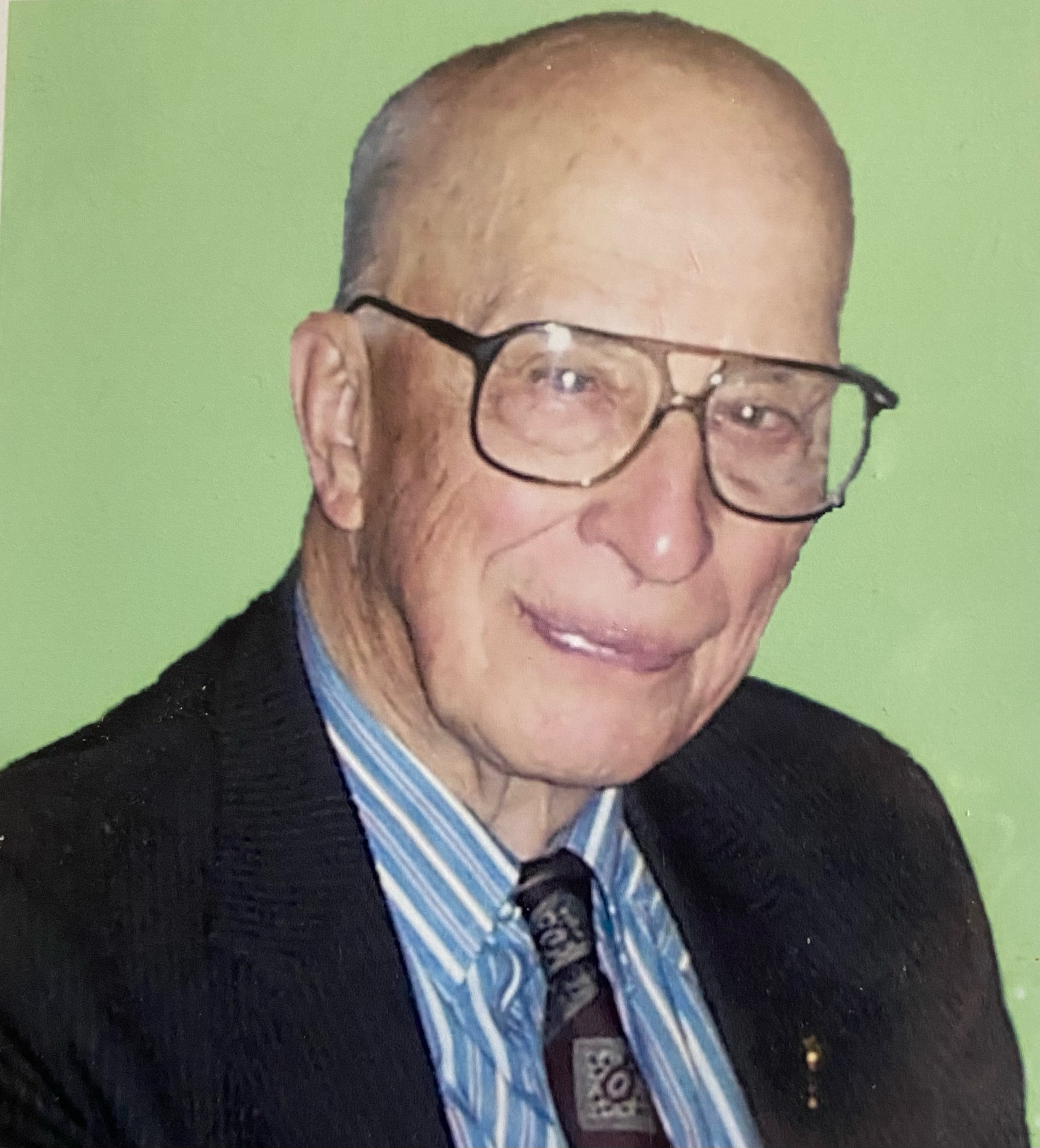
- Frank Appleby in the 2000s.

Member of the Legislative Assembly of Alberta
- In office 1971–1986
- Preceded by: Antonio Aloisio
- Succeeded by: District abolished
- Constituency: Athabasca

Personal details
- Born: December 23, 1913 Stocks, Alberta, Canada
- Died: May 18, 2015 (aged 101) Athabasca, Alberta, Canada
- Party: Progressive Conservative
- Spouse(s): Dorothy Audrey Minns m. 24 Jun 1959
- Children: Brian William Appleby
- Education: University of British Columbia, University of Saskatchewan, University of Toronto, Mount Allison University, University of Alberta, Oxford University
- Occupation: politician

Military service
- Allegiance: Canada
- Branch/service: Royal Canadian Air Force
- Rank: Sergeant

Frank Pierpoint Appleby (December 23, 1913 – May 18, 2015) was a Canadian politician and Royal Air Force officer from Alberta. He served in the Legislative Assembly of Alberta from 1971 to 1986 as a member of the Progressive Conservative caucus.

== Early life ==
Appleby was born in Stocks, Alberta to Ernest William Appleby (died c. 1915) and Fanny May Tench in 1913. He enlisted in the Royal Canadian Air Force during World War II and attained the rank of Sergeant.

== Political career ==
Appleby first ran for office in the 1944 Alberta general election for one of the three seats allocated to active servicemen in World War II. He finished fifth out of a field of seven candidates with 12% of the popular vote.

He made another bid for a seat in the Alberta legislature twenty-seven years later, in the 1971 general election as the Progressive Conservative candidate in the electoral district of Athabasca. He defeated two other candidates with 46% of the popular vote. He won a second term in office in the 1975 general election with almost 60% of the popular vote, his best showing in his career. He won a third term in the 1979 election with a larger number of votes than before, but with a slightly smaller percentage of the total votes. Appleby ran for a fourth and final term in the 1982 Alberta general election. He earned the highest number of votes in his political career, but a smaller percentage of the total vote than he won in 1979.

The Frank Appleby Professional Award is named in his honour by the College of Alberta Professional Foresters and is given to those who have made exemplary and significant contributions to the college. He received an honorary degree from Athabasca University in 2005. In December 2013 Appleby turned 100. He died on May 18, 2015, at the age of 101.
