= Jean Côté =

Canadian politician

The Honourable Jean Léon Côté
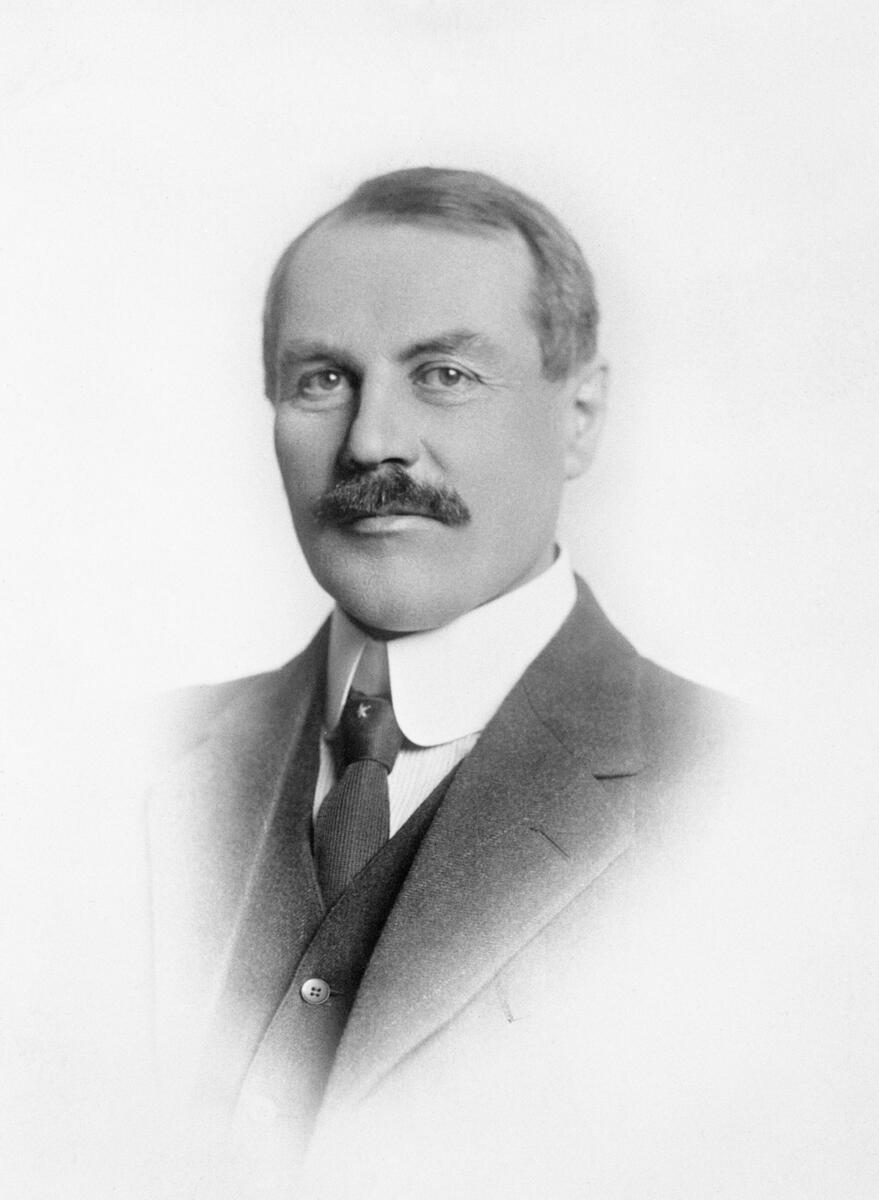

Member of the Legislative Assembly for Athabasca
- In office March 22, 1909 – March 25, 1913
- Preceded by: William Bredin
- Succeeded by: Alexander Grant MacKay
- In office March 25, 1913 – November 10, 1923
- Preceded by: New District
- Succeeded by: Leonidas Giroux
- Constituency: Grouard

Provincial Secretary
- In office September 25, 1918 – August 13, 1921
- Preceded by: Wilfrid Gariépy
- Succeeded by: Herbert Greenfield

Senator from Alberta
- In office August 14, 1923 – September 23, 1924

Personal details
- Born: May 26, 1867 Les Éboulements, Canada East
- Died: September 23, 1924 (aged 57)
- Party: Liberal (provincial); Liberal (federal)
- Children: 4, including Ernest

Jean Léon Côté (May 26, 1867 – September 23, 1924) was a Canadian politician. He served as a member of the Legislative Assembly of Alberta from 1909 until 1923, sitting with the provincial Liberal Party in both government and opposition. He vacated his provincial seat when he was appointed to the Senate of Canada in 1923. He served until his death in 1924, sitting with the federal Liberal caucus.

== Early life ==
Jean Léon Côté was born on May 26, 1867, in the village of Les Éboulements, Canada East, to Cléophas and Denise Côté. Côté was a surveyor and civil engineer by trade, and first visited the Edmonton area in 1886 as part of a survey crew. He returned to the East and trained as a Dominion Land Surveyor for the Department of the Interior, where he worked from 1893 to 1900. He participated in a number of high-profile projects, including the Alaska Boundary Commission.

== Political career ==
Côté ran for a seat to the Alberta Legislature in the 1909 election. He stood as the Liberal candidate in the electoral district of Athabasca, defeating incumbent Liberal candidate William Bredin in a hotly contested race.

The 1913 boundary redistribution added a number of new electoral districts to the province. Côté ran for re-election in the new electoral district of Grouard for the election held that year. He won a comfortable margin of victory over the Conservative candidate to pick up the new seat for his party.

Côté ran for a third term in office in the 1917 election. He significantly increased his popular vote winning a landslide in the two-way race. After the election Côté was appointed to a provincial cabinet post in 1918. He assumed the responsibility of the Provincial Secretary position, and held it until his government was defeated in 1921.

Côté ran for a fourth term in office in the 1921 election. He held his seat in a very hotly contested race over United Farmers candidate H.G. Dimsdale. Côté managed to hang on despite most of the Liberal caucus getting swept out of office.

Côté was appointed to the Senate of Canada on the advice of Mackenzie King on August 14, 1923, to represent Alberta. He sat with the Liberal Party of Canada caucus. Côté vacated his seat in the Legislature on November 10, 1923. He held his seat for a year until he died on September 23, 1924.

== Personal life ==
Jean Côté married Cécile Gagnon, who came from a wealthy Quebec City family, on February 4, 1907, and together had five children. His son Ernest Côté was a soldier and a diplomat.

== Honours ==
Mount Côté, along the British Columbia–Alberta border, and the Hamlet of Jean Cote, Alberta, in the Municipal District of Smoky River No. 130 are named after Côté.
