= Leonidas Giroux =

Canadian politician

Leonidas Alcidas Giroux KC
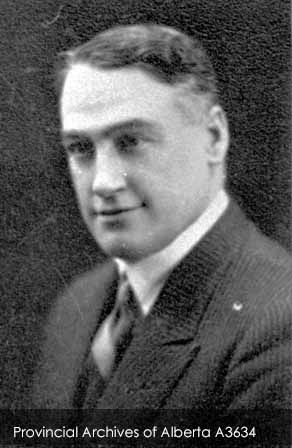

Member of the Legislative Assembly of Alberta
- In office July 11, 1924 – September 7, 1936
- Preceded by: Jean Côté
- Succeeded by: Joseph Tremblay
- Constituency: Grouard

Personal details
- Born: July 26, 1885 West Farnham, Quebec
- Died: September 7, 1936 (aged 51) Rochester, Minnesota
- Party: Liberal
- Occupation: politician

Leonidas Alcidas Giroux KC (July 26, 1885 – September 7, 1936) was a Canadian provincial politician from Alberta. He served as a member of the Legislative Assembly of Alberta sitting with the provincial Liberal caucus in opposition from 1924 until his death in 1936.

== Early life ==
Leonidas Alcidas Giroux was born July 26, 1885, at West Farnham, Quebec, to Leonide Giroux and Isabella D'Aragon. He attended Collège de Montréal, University of Paris and the Université catholique de Louvain in Belgium where he completed his post-graduate studies in Philosophy and Economics. He married Marie Irene Shinners on April 10, 1912.

== Political career ==
Giroux ran for a seat to the Alberta Legislature in a by-election held on July 11, 1924, in the electoral district of Grouard. He stood as a candidate for the Alberta Liberals running in a two way contest against United Farmers candidate J.M. Cull. Giroux held the seat for his party winning double the vote count of Cull to earn his first term in office.

Giroux ran for a second term in office less than two years later. when the 1926 Alberta general election was called. He ran for re-election in another two way contest and won easily. He increased his popular vote count by 200 over the by-election.

Giroux ran for a third term in the 1930 Alberta general election. This election saw him run in a hotly contested race against United Farmers candidate Jean Field who served as an original member on the Alberta Eugenics Board. Giroux won the two way race by just under 700 votes.

The 1935 Alberta general election saw the new Social Credit party sweep to power. Giroux was the only opposition candidate in a rural candidate that managed to retain his seat. He won the highest popular vote of his career fending off a strong challenge from two other candidates.

Giroux died on September 7, 1936. He had traveled to Rochester, Minnesota, to be treated at the Mayo Clinic for an undisclosed illness and died shortly after his arrival.
