= Clarence Tade =

Canadian politician

Clarence H. Tade

Member of the Legislative Assembly of Alberta
- In office August 22, 1935 – October 8, 1935
- Preceded by: Frank Falconer
- Succeeded by: Charles Ross
- Constituency: Athabasca
- In office November 7, 1938 – March 21, 1940
- Preceded by: Charles Ross
- Succeeded by: Gordon Lee

Personal details
- Born: March 15, 1883 Olney, Illinois, U.S.
- Died: January 5, 1961 (aged 77) Sonoma County, California
- Party: Social Credit
- Spouse: Edna Tade
- Occupation: politician

Clarence H. Tade (March 15, 1883 – January 5, 1961) was a Canadian provincial politician from Alberta. He briefly served as a member of the Legislative Assembly of Alberta twice. The first time briefly in 1935 and the second time from 1938 to 1940 sitting with the Social Credit caucus in government both times.

== Political career ==
Tade ran for a seat to the Alberta Legislature in the 1935 Alberta general election. He stood as a Social Credit candidate in the electoral district of Athabasca. Tade defeated incumbent Frank Falconer and another candidate with a solid majority to pick up the seat for his party, the election saw Social Credit sweep to power to form government.

Shortly after the election Premier William Aberhart appointed his cabinet. He needed a seat for himself and the new Minister of Lands and Mines Charles Ross. Tade decided to resign his seat on October 8, 1935 along with William Morrison. Aberhart wanted Ross to hold a northern seat to deal quell complaints about lack of cabinet representation in the northern part of the province despite the fact that Ross was from Calgary. The decision to resign became a controversy after allegations were made that Tade was forced to resign his seat. After resigning his seat Tade was made President of the Social Credit Party.

Charles Ross died a few years after being elected forcing a by-election again in Athabasca. Social Credit had asked prominent Liberal James Cornwall to run under the Social Credit banner to which he refused. Tade also sought out the nomination but his candidacy was initially refused because the government believed that he would not be able to command any support. A hotly contested nomination race ensued between Tade and Reed Dorry whom the Social Credit party felt to be a Communist and had the backing of 150 supporters.

Tade was chosen as the candidate by members of the selection committee on October 18, 1938 at a meeting held in his home town of Colinton, Alberta. In the by-election campaign Tade won the two race with a solid margin of victory on November 7, 1938 to return to the Legislature. The early results from the northern part of the riding in the race initially had Liberal candidate Whitley leading by a very close margin. The southern results put Tade in the lead and allowed him to win.

Tade ran for the nomination to run as the Social Credit candidate again in the 1940 Alberta general election. He was defeated by Gordon Lee who was the returning officer in the 1938 by-election. Tade retired from the legislature at dissolution of the assembly in 1940 rather than seeking re-election as an Independent.

Upon declining health, Tade and his wife moved to Penticton, British Columbia in the early 1950s. His wife, Edna Tade died there late in the 1950s and Clarence moved to live with his daughter in California, dying there in 1961.
