= George Mills (politician) =

Canadian politician

Member of the Legislative Assembly of Alberta
- In office June 3, 1920 – June 28, 1926
- Preceded by: Alexander MacKay
- Succeeded by: John Frame
- Constituency: Athabasca

Personal details
- Born: January 17, 1876 Oxford, Ontario
- Died: August 17, 1948 (aged 72)
- Party: Liberal; Independent Liberal
- Occupation: politician

George Mills (January 17, 1876 – August 17, 1948) was a provincial politician from Alberta, Canada. He served as a member of the Legislative Assembly of Alberta from 1920 to 1926 sitting with the Liberal caucus in government and opposition.

== Political career ==
Mills ran for a seat to the Alberta Legislature in a by-election held in the Athabasca electoral district on June 3, 1920. He stood as the Liberal candidate in a straight fight against former MLA and Independent candidate James Cornwall. Mills won the race with almost 70% of the popular vote.

Mills ran for a second term a year later in the 1921 general election. Mills was projected to be returned unopposed, however Conservative candidate John Angelo filed nomination papers at the last minute. Mills was returned with a landslide.

The run up to the 1926 Alberta general election saw tension increase between Mills and the Liberal party. A nominating convention was called in the spring of 1926 that saw Liberal candidate John W. Frame win to become the Athabasca candidate. The Liberal executive scrapped and re-called the meeting for May 28, 1926. Frame was the only candidate to attend as Mills did not run at the meeting in protest that it was called without time for party members in the northern part of the riding to travel and attend the meeting. Mills instead ran for re-election as an Independent Liberal and was defeated finishing last in a hotly contested race that went to ballot transfers.
