= Hugh John Montgomery =

Canadian politician (1876-1956)

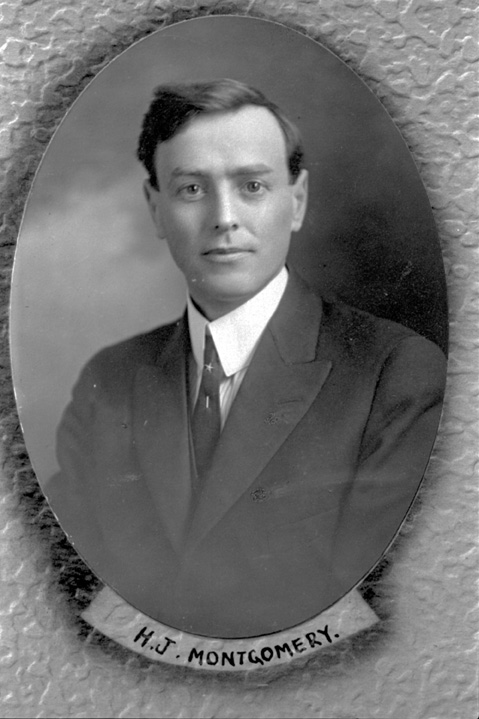

Member of the Legislative Assembly of Alberta
- In office November 17, 1914 – July 18, 1921
- Preceded by: Charles Olin
- Succeeded by: Evert Sparks
- Constituency: Wetaskiwin
- In office June 19, 1930 – August 22, 1935
- Preceded by: Evert Sparks
- Succeeded by: John Wingblade

Personal details
- Born: August 28, 1841 Bedeque, Prince Edward Island
- Died: August 30, 1956 (aged 80) Edmonton, Alberta, Canada
- Party: Liberal
- Occupation: merchant, fox farmer and politician

Hugh John Montgomery (July 31, 1876 – August 30, 1956) was a politician from Alberta, Canada. He served as a politician on the municipal and provincial levels of government in Alberta. He served on the city council of Wetaskiwin in various posts between 1906 and 1929. He also served in the Legislative Assembly of Alberta from 1914 to 1921 and again from 1930 to 1935 as a member of the Liberal Party in both government and opposition.

== Early life ==
Hugh John Montgomery was born in Bedeque, Prince Edward Island on July 31, 1878. He grew up on the island and attended Charlottetown Business College He moved west in 1898 after graduating and settled in Wetaskiwin when it was still in the Northwest Territories.

Montgomery became a merchandiser and owned part of a large grain and livestock ranch. He became involved in municipal politics soon after settling in the community.

== Political career ==
=== Municipal ===
Montgomery served as an Alderman in Wetaskiwin from 1906 to 1909. He ran successfully for mayor of the city in 1910. In 1922 he was elected Chief Magistrate of the city and held that position until 1929.

=== Provincial ===
Montgomery first ran for a seat to the Alberta Legislature in a by-election on November 17, 1914, in the electoral district of Wetaskiwin. The by-election was called after the death of incumbent Charles Olin. Montgomery was elected by a wide margin over Conservative candidate Finlay Watson, who thus lost his deposit.

In the 1917 general election he was re-elected in a landslide over Conservative candidate R.M. Angus.

In the 1921 general election he was defeated by Evert Sparks of the United Farmers of Alberta.

Montgomery and Sparks faced each other again in the 1926 general election, Sparks beat Montgomery by less than two hundred votes on the second vote count. The Conservative candidate's second-choice ballots were distributed after being dropped out in the first round, and most of them went to the UFA candidate, instead of to Montgomery.

Montgomery ran against Sparks for the third time in the 1930 general election and defeated him in a closely contested two-way, thus returning to office nine years after his defeat.

Montgomery was defeated again in the 1935 general election, this time by John Wingblade of the Social Credit League. He finished a distant second in the field of five candidates.

Montgomery attempted another comeback as an independent in the 1944 general election. He was once again defeated by Wingblade, finishing a very distant third place in the field of four candidates.
