= Athabasca (Alberta provincial electoral district) =

Defunct provincial electoral district in Alberta, Canada

Alberta electoral district

Defunct provincial electoral district
- Legislature: Legislative Assembly of Alberta
- District created: 1905
- District abolished: 1986
- First contested: 1905
- Last contested: 1982

Athabasca was a provincial electoral district in Alberta, Canada, mandated to return a single member to the Legislative Assembly of Alberta from 1905 to 1986.

== History ==
The Athabasca electoral district was one of the original 25 electoral districts contested in the 1905 Alberta general election upon Alberta becoming a province in September 1905. Throughout the years the boundaries of this district in northeast Alberta changed.

The Athabasca electoral district returned a single member to the Legislative Assembly through first-past-the-post system of voting from 1905 until 1924, when the United Farmers government introduced a new The Alberta Election Act which instituted instant-runoff voting in rural electoral districts throughout the province. Instant-runoff voting remained in use until the Social Credit government amended The Election Act prior to the 1959 Alberta general election. The new Act returned every district in the province to a single member elected through first-past-the-post voting system. Instant-runoff voting had no evident impact on the results in the Athabasca district, as a candidate received a majority of votes (above 50%) in the first round of counting in all general elections besides 1926, 1940 and 1955. In those three cases the candidate in the winning position in the first round went on to be elected even after vote transfers.

The Athabasca district was re-distributed prior to the 1986 Alberta general election. The area the district covered was merged with Lac La Biche to form the riding of Athabasca-Lac La Biche.

=== Members of the Legislative Assembly (MLAs) ===
Members of the Legislative Assembly for Athabasca
Assembly	Years	Member	Party
1st	1905–1909	William Bredin	Liberal
2nd	1909–1913	Jean Côté	Liberal
3rd	1913–1917	Alexander Grant MacKay	Liberal
4th	1917–1920	Alexander Grant MacKay	Liberal
4th	1920–1921	George Mills	Liberal
5th	1921–1926	George Mills	Liberal
5th	1926–1926	George Mills	Independent Liberal
6th	1926–1930	John W. Frame	Liberal
6th	1930–1930	John W. Frame	United Farmers
7th	1930–1935	Frank Robert Falconer	Liberal
8th	1935–1935	Clarence H. Tade	Social Credit
8th	1935–1940	Charles Cathmer Ross	Social Credit
9th	1940–1944	Gordon William Lee	Social Credit
10th	1944–1948	Gordon William Lee	Social Credit
11th	1948–1952	Gordon William Lee	Social Credit
12th	1952–1955	Antonio Aloisio	Social Credit
13th	1955–1959	Antonio Aloisio	Social Credit
14th	1959–1963	Antonio Aloisio	Social Credit
15th	1963–1967	Antonio Aloisio	Social Credit
16th	1967–1971	Antonio Aloisio	Social Credit
17th	1971–1975	Frank Pierpoint Appleby	Progressive Conservative
18th	1975–1979	Frank Pierpoint Appleby	Progressive Conservative
19th	1979–1982	Frank Pierpoint Appleby	Progressive Conservative
20th	1982–1986	Frank Pierpoint Appleby	Progressive Conservative
See Athabasca-Lac La Biche electoral district from 1986 to 1993

=== Boundary history ===
Athabasca 1905 Boundaries
Bordering districts
North	East	West	South
N/A	N/A	Peace River	St. Albert, Sturgeon, Victoria
Legal description from The Alberta Act, 4 & 5 Edward VII 1905, c. 3 (The Alberta Act at Wikisource)
"Commencing at the eastern boundary of the province of Alberta where it is intersected by the north boundary of the 70th township; thence northerly along the said eastern boundary of the province of Alberta to the northern boundary of the said province; thence westerly along the said northern boundary of the province of Alberta to the meridian between the 20th and 21st ranges, west of the 4th meridian; thence southerly along the said meridian between the 20th and 21st ranges to the north boundary of the 92nd township; thence westerly along the said north boundary of the 92nd townships to the meridian between the 13th and 14th ranges, west of the 5th meridian; thence southerly along the said meridian between the 13th and 14th ranges, west of the 5th meridian to the north boundary of the 80th township; thence westerly along the said north boundary of the 80th townships to the meridian between the 19th and 20th ranges, west of the 5th meridian; thence southerly along the said meridian between the 19th and 20th ranges to the north boundary of the 70th township; thence easterly along the said north boundary of the 70th townships to the point of commencement."
Note:

Athabasca 1913 boundaries
Bordering districts
North	East	West	South
N/A	N/A	Peace River, Grouard	Beaver River, Sturgeon, St. Paul
Legal description from The Legislative Assembly Act, S.A. 1913, c. 2
"Commencing at the eastern boundary of the Province of Alberta where it is intersected by the northern boundary of the said province; thence west along the northern boundary of the said Province of Alberta to the meridian line between ranges 13 and 14, west of the 5th meridian; thence south along the said meridian line between ranges 13 and 14, west of the 5th meridian to the north boundary of the 92nd townships; thence east along the said north boundary of the 92nd townships to the meridian line between ranges 24 and 25, west of the 4th meridian; thence south along the said meridian line between ranges 24 and 25, west of the 4th meridian to the north boundary of the 65th townships; thence east along the said north boundary of 65th townships to the meridian line between ranges 17 and 18, west of the 4th meridian; thence north along said meridian line between ranges 17 and 18, west of the 4th meridian to the north boundary of the 70th townships; thence east along the said north boundary of the 70th townships to the eastern boundary of the Province of Alberta; thence north along said eastern boundary of the Province of Alberta to the point of commencement."
Note:

Athabasca 1930 boundaries
Bordering districts
North	East	West	South
N/A	N/A	Peace River, Grouard, Pembina	Beaver River, Sturgeon, St. Paul
Legal description from The Legislative Assembly Act, S.A. 1930, c. 14
"—Commencing at the intersection of the 5th meridian with the north boundary of the Province of Alberta; thence south along the said 5th meridian to the north boundary of townships 92; thence east along the said north boundary of townships 92 to the meridian line between ranges 24 and 25, west of the 4th meridian; thence south along the said meridian line between ranges 24 and 25, west of the 4th meridian, to the north boundary of townships 62; thence east along the said north boundary of townships 62 to the meridian line between ranges 21 and 22, west of the 4th meridian; thence north along the said meridian line between ranges 21 and 22, west of the 4th meridian, to the north boundary of townships 63; thence east along the said north boundary of townships 63 to the meridian line between ranges 17 and 18, west of the 4th meridian; thence north along the said meridian line between ranges 17 and 18, west of the 4th meridian, to the north boundary of townships 70; thence east along the north boundary of townships 70 to the east boundary of the Province of Alberta; thence north along the said east boundary of the Province of Alberta to the north boundary of the Province of Alberta; thence west along the said north boundary of the Province of Alberta to the point of commencement."
Note:

Athabasca 1939 boundaries
Bordering districts
North	East	West	South
N/A	N/A	Peace River, Grouard, Pembina	Beaver River, Redwater, St. Paul
Legal description from The Legislative Assembly Act, S.A. 1939, c. 94
"—Electoral Division of Athabaska, the boundary whereof is as follows: Commencing at the intersection of the 60th degree parallel of latitude with the 4th meridian; thence south along the 4th meridian to the north-east corner of township 72, range 1, west of the 4th meridian; thence west along the north boundary of township 72, ranges 1 to 17, inclusive, west of the 4th meridian, to the north-east corner of township 72, range 18, west of the 4th meridian; thence south along the meridian between ranges 17 and 18, west of the 4th meridian to the north-east corner of township 60, range 18, west of the 4th meridian; thence west along the north boundary of township 60, ranges 18 to 20, inclusive, west of the 4th meridian to the north-east corner of township 60, range 21, west of the 4th meridian; thence south along the east boundary of township 60, range 21, west of the 4th meridian to the north-east corner of township 59, range 21, west of the 4th meridian; thence west along the north boundary of township 59, ranges 21 to 23, inclusive, west of the 4th meridian to the north-east corner of township 59, range 24, west of the 4th meridian; thence north along the east boundary of township 60, range 24, west of the 4th meridian to the north-east corner of township 60, range 24, west of the 4th meridian; thence west along the north boundary of the said township to the northeast corner of township 60, range 25, west of the 4th meridian; thence north along. the meridian between ranges 24 and 25, west of the 4th meridian to the north-east corner of township 76, range 25, west of the 4th meridian; thence east along the north boundary of township 76, ranges 24 to 21, inclusive, west of the 4th meridian to the north-east corner of township 76, range 21, west of the 4th meridian; thence north along the meridian between ranges 20 and 21, west of the 4th meridian to the north-east corner of township 82, range 21, west of the 4th meridian, then west along the north boundary of township 82, ranges 21 to 26, inclusive, to the intersection with the 5th meridian; thence north along the 5th meridian to the intersection with the 60th degree parallel of latitude; thence east along the 60th degree parallel of latitude to the point of commencement."
Note:

Athabasca 1950 boundaries
Bordering districts
North	East	West	South
Lac La Biche	N/A	Grouard, Pembina	Redwater, St. Albert
Legal description from The Legislative Assembly Act, S.A. 1950, c. 36
"—Electoral Division of Athabasca, the boundary whereof is as follows : Commencing at the intersection of the left bank of the Athabasca River with the east boundary of section 1, township 72, range 26, west of the 4th meridian; thence southerly along the meridian between ranges 25 and 26 to the north-east corner of section 12, township 59, range 26, west of the 4th meridian; thence easterly along the north boundary of sections 7 to 12 inclusive, township 59, range 25, west of the 4th meridian and sections 7 to 12 inclusive of township 59, range 24, west of the 4th, meridian; thence northerly along the meridian between ranges 23 and 24 to the north-east corner of township 59, range 24, west of the 4th meridian; thence easterly along the north boundary of township 59, range 23, west of the 4th meridian to the north-east corner of township 59, range 23, west of the 4th meridian; thence northerly along the meridian between ranges 22 and 23 to the north-east corner of township 60, range 23, west of the 4th meridian; thence easterly along the north boundary of township 60, ranges 22 to 18 inclusive, west of the 4th meridian to the north-east corner of township 60, range 18, west of the 4th meridian; thence northerly along the meridian between ranges 17 and 18 to the north-east corner of township 63, range 18, west of the 4th meridian; thence westerly along the north boundary of township 63, range 18, west of the 4th meridian to the north-east corner of township 63, range 19, west of the 4th meridian; thence northerly along the meridian between ranges 18 and 19 to the north-east corner of township 65, range 19, west of the fourth meridian; thence westerly along the north boundary of township 65, ranges 19 and 20, west of the 4th meridian to the north-east corner of township 65, range 21, west of the 4th meridian; thence northerly along the meridian between ranges 20 and 21 to an intersection with the left bank of the Athabasca River; thence in a generally north-easterly direction along the said left bank to its intersection with the north boundary of township 69, range 18, west of the 4th meridian; thence easterly along the north boundary of township 69, range 18, west of the 4th meridian to the north-east corner of township 69, range 18, . west of the 4th meridian; thence northerly along the meridian between ranges 17 and 18 to the north-east corner of township 73, range 18, west of the 4th meridian; thence easterly along the north boundary of township 73, ranges 17 and 16, west of the 4th meridian to the north-east corner of township 73, range 16, west of the 4th meridian; thence northerly along the meridian between ranges 15 and 16 to the north-east corner of township 85, range 16, west of the 4th meridian; thence westerly along the north boundary of township 85, ranges 16 to 20 inclusive west of the 4th meridian to the north-east corner of township 85, range 21, west of the 4th meridian; thence southerly along the meridian between ranges 20 and 21 to the north-east corner of township 76, range 21, west of the 4th meridian; thence westerly along the north boundary of township 76, ranges 21 to 24 inclusive, west of the 4th meridian to the northeast corner of township 76, range 25, west . of the 4th meridian; thence southerly along the meridian between ranges 24 and 25 to an intersection with the left bank of the Athabasca River; thence in a generally south-westerly direction along the said left bank to the point of commencement."
Note:

Athabasca 1970 boundaries
Bordering districts
North	East	West	South
Lac La Biche-McMurray, Lesser Slave Lake	N/A	Barrhead	Redwater-Andrew, St. Albert
Legal description from The Legislative Assembly Act, S.A. 1970, c. 34
"—The boundary whereof is as follows : Commencing at the north-east corner of township 76, range 18, west of the 4th meridian; thence southerly along the east boundary of range 18, west of the 4th meridian to the north-east corner of section 1 in township 61, range 18, west of the 4th meridian; thence westerly along the north boundary of sections 1 to 6 in township 61, range 18, west of the 4th meridian and sections 1 to 6 in township 61, range 19, west of the 4th meridian and sections 1 to 6 in township 61, range 20, west of the 4th meridian and sections 1 to 6 in township 61, range 21, west of the 4th meridian to the east boundary of range 22, west of the 4th meridian; thence northerly along the said east boundary to the north boundary of township 61; thence westerly along the said north boundary to the east boundary of range 26, west of the 4th meridian; thence southerly along the said east boundary to the northeast corner of section 12 in township 59, range 26, west of the 4th meridian; thence westerly along the north boundary of sections 7 to 12 inclusive in township 59, range 26, west of the 4th meridian and sections 8 to 12 inclusive in township 59, range 27, west of the 4th meridian to the 5th meridian; thence northerly along the said 5th meridian to its most southerly intersection with the left bank of the Pembina River in township 60; thence downstream along the said left bank to its intersection with the right bank of the Athabasca River; thence downstream along the said right bank of the Athabasca River to the north boundary of township 66; thence westerly along the said north boundary to the east boundary of range 3, west of the 5th meridian; thence northerly along the said east boundary to the north boundary of township 68; thence easterly along the said north boundary to the east boundary of range 26, west of the 4th meridian; thence northerly along the said east boundary to the left bank of the Athabasca River; thence downstream along the said left bank to the east boundary of range 25, west of the 4th meridian; thence northerly along the said east boundary to the north boundary of township 76; thence easterly along the said north boundary to the point of commencement."
Note:

Athabasca 1977 boundaries
Bordering districts
North	East	West	South
Lac La Biche-McMurray, Lesser Slave Lake	N/A	Barrhead	Redwater-Andrew, St. Albert
Legal description from The Legislative Assembly Act, S.A. 1977, c. 28
"—The boundary whereof is as follows: Commencing at the north-east corner of township 76, range 18, west of the 4th meridian; thence southerly along the east boundary of range 18, west of the 4th meridian to the north-east corner of section 1 in township 61, range 18, west of the 4th meridian; thence westerly along the north boundary of sections 1 to 6 in said township and sections 1 to 6 in township 61, range 19, west of the 4th meridian and sections 1 to 6 in township 61, range 20, west of the 4th meridian and sections 1 to 6 in township 61, range 21, west of the 4th meridian to the east boundary of range 22, west of the 4th meridian; thence northerly along the said east boundary to the north boundary of township 61; thence westerly along the said north boundary to the east boundary of range 26, west of the 4th meridian; thence southerly along the said east boundary to the north boundary of township 58; thence easterly along the said north boundary to the north-east corner of section 35 in township 58, range 26, west of the 4th meridian; thence southerly along the east boundary of sections 35, 26, 23, 14, 11 and 2 in said township and sections 35, 26, 23 and 14 in township 57, range 26, west of the 4th meridian to the northeast corner of section 11 in township 57, range 26, west of the 4th meridian; thence westerly along the north boundary of sections 7 to 11 inclusive in said township and sections 7 to 12 inclusive in township 57, range 27, west of the 4th meridian to the 5th meridian; thence northerly along the said 5th meridian to its most southerly intersection with the left bank of the Pembina River in township 60; thence downstream along the said left bank to its intersection with the right bank of the Athabasca River; thence downstream along the said right bank of the Athabasca River to the north boundary of township 66; thence westerly along the said north boundary to the east boundary of range 3, west of the 5th meridian; thence northerly along the said east boundary to the north boundary of township 68; thence easterly along the said north boundary to the left bank of the Athabasca River; thence downstream along the said left bank to the east boundary of range 25, west of the 4th meridian; thence northerly along the said east boundary to the north boundary of township 76; thence easterly along the said north boundary to the point of commencement."

== Election results ==
=== 1905 ===
Returning officer
Henry Barrington Round

The Athabasca electoral district was created in 1905 as part of the original twenty-five electoral districts when Alberta was formed into a province from the Northwest Territories. The district consisted mostly of undeveloped wilderness covering the eastern half of northern Alberta. In 1905 the primary occupation was hunting and trapping and the local economy existed around the fur trade. The town of Athabasca, which was the only major settlement in the district, was experiencing a boom at that time as people flocked north to buy real estate.

The provincial Liberal party nominated William Fletcher Bredin as their candidate. He was a pioneer fur trader and was well known in the district. He made history by becoming the first person acclaimed to serve in the Legislative Assembly of Alberta. The provincial Conservative party being very weak in organization in northern Alberta was unable to find a candidate to oppose him. This was the only electoral district during this general election that sent a candidate to Edmonton by acclamation.

1905 Alberta general election
Party	Candidate	Votes	%	±%
Liberal	William Fletcher Bredin	Acclaimed	–	–
Total		N/A	–	–
Rejected, spoiled and declined		N/A	–	–
Eligible electors / turnout		N/A	N/A	–
Liberal pickup new district.				
Source(s) Source: "Athabasca Official Results 1905 Alberta general election". Alberta Heritage Community Foundation.

=== 1909 ===
1909 Alberta general election
Party	Candidate	Votes	%	±%
Liberal	Jean Côté	230	59.59%	–
Liberal	William Fletcher Bredin	149	38.60%	–
Conservative	V. Maurice	7	1.81%	–
Total		386	–	–
Rejected, spoiled and declined		N/A	–	–
Eligible electors / turnout		620	62.26%	–
Liberal hold		Swing		N/A
Source(s) Source: "Athabasca Official Results 1909 Alberta general election". Alberta Heritage Community Foundation.

=== 1913 ===
1913 Alberta general election
Party	Candidate	Votes	%
Liberal	Alexander Grant MacKay	414	65.20%
Conservative	James H. Wood	221	34.80%
Total		635	–
Source(s) Source: "Athabasca Official Results 1913 Alberta general election". Alberta Heritage Community Foundation.

=== 1917 ===
1917 Alberta general election
Party	Candidate	Votes	%	±%
Liberal	Alexander Grant MacKay	752	65.79%	0.59%
Conservative	Alfred F. Fugl	391	34.21%	-0.59%
Total		1,143	–	–
Rejected, spoiled and declined		N/A	–	–
Eligible electors / turnout		1,595	71.66%	–
Liberal hold		Swing		0.59%
Source(s) Source: "Athabasca Official Results 1917 Alberta general election". Alberta Heritage Community Foundation.

=== 1918 by-election ===
Alberta provincial by-election, September 27, 1918 Ministerial by-election upon Alexander Grant MacKay's appointment as Minister of Municipal Affairs
Party	Candidate	Votes	%	±%
Liberal	Alexander Grant MacKay	Acclaimed	–	–
Total		N/A	–	–
Rejected, spoiled and declined		N/A	–	–
Eligible electors / turnout		N/A	N/A	–
Liberal hold		Swing		N/A
Source(s) "By-elections". Elections Alberta.

=== 1920 by-election ===
Alberta provincial by-election, June 3, 1920 Upon Alexander Grant MacKay's death on April 25, 1920
Party	Candidate	Votes	%	±%
Liberal	George Mills	640	69.11%	–
Independent	James Cornwall	286	30.89%	–
Total		926	–	–
Rejected, spoiled and declined		N/A	–	–
Eligible electors / turnout		N/A	N/A	–
Liberal hold		Swing		N/A
Source(s) "By-elections". Elections Alberta.

=== 1921 ===
1921 Alberta general election
Party	Candidate	Votes	%	±%
Liberal	George Mills	1,043	70.43%	4.63%
Conservative	John Angelo	438	29.57%	-4.63%
Total		1,481	–	–
Rejected, spoiled and declined		N/A	–	–
Eligible electors / turnout		N/A	N/A	–
Liberal hold		Swing		4.63%
Source(s) Source: "Athabasca Official Results 1921 Alberta general election". Alberta Heritage Community Foundation.

=== 1926 ===
1926 Alberta general election
Party	Candidate	Votes	%	±%
First count
Liberal	John W. Frame	373	32.89%	-37.54%
United Farmers	J. P. Evans	295	26.01%	–
Conservative	W. J. Dent	245	21.61%	-7.96%
Independent Liberal	George Mills	221	19.49%	–
Total		1,134	–	–
Ballot transfer results
Liberal	John W. Frame	451	55.41%	–
United Farmers	J. P. Evans	363	44.59%	–
Conservative	W. J. Dent	Eliminated	–	–
Independent Liberal	George Mills	Eliminated	–	–
Total		814	–	–
Rejected, spoiled and declined		62	–	–
Eligible electors / turnout		1,750	68.34%	–
Liberal hold		Swing		-20.43%
Source(s) Source: "Athabasca Official Results 1926 Alberta general election". Alberta Heritage Community Foundation. Instant-runoff voting requires a candidate to receive a plurality (greater than 50%) of the votes. As no candidate received a plurality of votes, the bottom candidate was eliminated and their 2nd place votes were applied to both other candidates until one received a plurality

=== 1930 ===
1930 Alberta general election
Party	Candidate	Votes	%	±%
Liberal	Frank Robert Falconer	1,057	55.11%	22.22%
United Farmers	John W. Frame	861	44.89%	18.88%
Total		1,918	–	–
Rejected, spoiled and declined		81	–	–
Eligible electors / turnout		3,129	63.89%	–
Liberal gain from Party		Swing		5.11%
Source(s) Source: "Athabasca Official Results 1930 Alberta general election". Alberta Heritage Community Foundation.

=== 1935 ===
1935 Alberta general election
Party	Candidate	Votes	%	±%
Social Credit	Clarence H. Tade	1,764	58.24%	–
Liberal	Frank Robert Falconer	950	31.36%	-34.43%
Conservative	Angus McLeod	315	10.40%	-23.81%
Total		3,029	–	–
Rejected, spoiled and declined		N/A	–	–
Eligible electors / turnout		4,264	71.04%	–
Social Credit gain from Party		Swing		8.33%
Source(s) Source: "Athabasca Official Results 1935 Alberta general election". Alberta Heritage Community Foundation.

=== 1935 by-election ===
Alberta provincial by-election, November 4, 1935 Upon Clarence H. Tade's resignation on October 8, 1935 to provide a seat for Minister Charles Cathmer Ross
Party	Candidate	Votes	%	±%
Social Credit	Charles Cathmer Ross	Acclaimed	–	–
Total		N/A	–	–
Rejected, spoiled and declined		N/A	–	–
Eligible electors / turnout		N/A	N/A	–
Social Credit hold		Swing		N/A
Source(s) "By-elections". Elections Alberta.

=== 1940 ===
1940 Alberta general election
Party	Candidate	Votes	%	±%
First count
Social Credit	Gordon William Lee	1,965	48.13%	-10.11%
Independent	M. P. Cordingley	1,336	32.72%	–
Co-operative Commonwealth	Norman J. Shopland	782	19.15%	–
Total		4,083	–	–
Ballot transfer results
Social Credit	Gordon William Lee	2,078	58.13%	–
Independent	M. P. Cordingley	1,497	41.87%	–
Co-operative Commonwealth	Norman J. Shopland	Eliminated	–	–
Total		3,575	–	–
Rejected, spoiled and declined		N/A	–	–
Eligible electors / turnout		6,938	61.92%	–
Social Credit hold		Swing		4.38%
Source(s) Source: "Athabasca Official Results 1940 Alberta general election". Alberta Heritage Community Foundation. Instant-runoff voting requires a candidate to receive a plurality (greater than 50%) of the votes. As no candidate received a plurality of votes, the bottom candidate was eliminated and their 2nd place votes were applied to both other candidates until one received a plurality

=== 1944 ===
1944 Alberta general election
Party	Candidate	Votes	%	±%
Social Credit	Gordon William Lee	2,288	53.73%	5.60%
Co-operative Commonwealth	John E. Ball	1,410	33.11%	13.96%
Labor–Progressive	G. J. McKenzie	560	13.15%	–
Total		4,258	–	–
Rejected, spoiled and declined		120	–	–
Eligible electors / turnout		7,132	61.39%	–
Social Credit hold		Swing		10.31%
Source(s) Source: "Athabasca Official Results 1944 Alberta general election". Alberta Heritage Community Foundation.

=== 1948 ===
1948 Alberta general election
Party	Candidate	Votes	%	±%
Social Credit	Gordon William Lee	2,374	52.08%	-1.65%
Co-operative Commonwealth	Norman J. Shopland	1,226	26.90%	-6.21%
Liberal	Victor C. Hicks	958	21.02%	–
Total		4,558	–	–
Rejected, spoiled and declined		251	–	–
Eligible electors / turnout		8,148	59.02%	-2.37%
Social Credit hold		Swing		2.28%
Source(s) Source: "Athabasca Official Results 1948 Alberta general election". Alberta Heritage Community Foundation.

=== 1952 ===
1952 Alberta general election
Party	Candidate	Votes	%	±%
Social Credit	Antonio Aloisio	2,012	50.78%	-1.30%
Liberal	Val M. Breckenridge	864	21.81%	0.79%
Co-operative Commonwealth	J. Lyall McMillan	623	15.72%	-11.18%
Farmer	Sam Nowakowsky	463	11.69%	–
Total		3,962	–	–
Rejected, spoiled and declined		321	–	–
Eligible electors / turnout		6,457	66.33%	7.31%
Social Credit gain		Swing		1.89%
Source(s) Source: "Athabasca Official Results 1952 Alberta general election". Alberta Heritage Community Foundation.

=== 1955 ===
1955 Alberta general election
Party	Candidate	Votes	%	±%
First count
Social Credit	Antonio Aloisio	2,073	46.43%	-2.72%
Liberal	Richard Edward Hall	2,069	46.34%	26.76%
Labor–Progressive	John Harry	293	3.38%	–
Total		4,435	–	–
Ballot transfer results
Liberal	Richard Edward Hall	2,145	50.57%	–
Social Credit	Antonio Aloisio	2,097	49.43%	–
Labor–Progressive	John Harry	Eliminated	–	–
Total		4,242	–	–
Rejected, spoiled and declined		N/A	–	–
Eligible electors / turnout		6,581	67.39%	–
Liberal gain from Social Credit		Swing		-14.23%
Source(s) Source: "Athabasca Official Results 1955 Alberta general election". Alberta Heritage Community Foundation. Instant-runoff voting requires a candidate to receive a plurality (greater than 50%) of the votes. As no candidate received a plurality of votes, the bottom candidate was eliminated and their 2nd place votes were applied to both other candidates until one received a plurality

=== 1959 ===
1959 Alberta general election
Party	Candidate	Votes	%	±%
Social Credit	Antonio Aloisio	2,333	54.29%	7.86%
Liberal	Richard Edward Hall	1,069	24.88%	-21.46%
Progressive Conservative	Robert Shopland	707	16.45%	–
Labor–Progressive	John Harry	188	4.38%	1.00%
Total		4,297	–	–
Rejected, spoiled and declined		10	–	–
Eligible electors / turnout		5,999	71.80%	–
Social Credit gain from Liberal		Swing		14.45%
Source(s) Source: "Athabasca Official Results 1959 Alberta general election". Alberta Heritage Community Foundation.

=== 1963 ===
1963 Alberta general election
Party	Candidate	Votes	%	±%
Social Credit	Antonio Aloisio	2,241	50.83%	-3.47%
Liberal	Dave Hunter	1,827	41.44%	16.56%
New Democratic	Judith Johnston	223	5.06%	–
Communist	Trygve Hansen	118	2.68%	–
Total		4,409	–	–
Rejected, spoiled and declined		35	–	–
Eligible electors / turnout		6,070	73.21%	–
Social Credit hold		Swing		-10.01%
Source(s) Source: "Athabasca Official Results 1963 Alberta general election". Alberta Heritage Community Foundation.

=== 1967 ===
1967 Alberta general election
Party	Candidate	Votes	%	±%
Social Credit	Antonio Aloisio	1,733	45.11%	-5.72%
New Democratic	George Opryshko	1,170	30.45%	25.40%
Liberal	Dave Hunter	939	24.44%	-17.00%
Total		3,842	–	–
Rejected, spoiled and declined		2	–	–
Eligible electors / turnout		5,604	68.59%	–
Social Credit hold		Swing		2.63%
Source(s) Source: "Athabasca Official Results 1967 Alberta general election". Alberta Heritage Community Foundation.

=== 1971 ===
1971 Alberta general election
Party	Candidate	Votes	%	±%
Progressive Conservative	Frank Pierpoint Appleby	3,261	46.71%	–
Social Credit	Allan Gerlach	2,585	37.02%	-8.09%
New Democratic	Peter Opryshko	1,136	16.27%	-14.17%
Total		6,982	–	–
Rejected, spoiled and declined		51	–	–
Eligible electors / turnout		9,200	76.45%	7.14%
Progressive Conservative gain from Social Credit		Swing		-2.49%
Source(s) Source: "Athabasca Official Results 1971 Alberta general election". Alberta Heritage Community Foundation.

=== 1975 ===
1975 Alberta general election
Party	Candidate	Votes	%	±%
Progressive Conservative	Frank Pierpoint Appleby	3,723	59.88%	13.17%
New Democratic	Peter Opryshko	1,686	27.12%	10.90%
Social Credit	Peter Hupka	582	9.36%	-27.66%
Liberal	John Murphy	226	3.64%	–
Total		6,217	–	–
Rejected, spoiled and declined		26	–	–
Eligible electors / turnout		8,923	69.97%	-6.47%
Progressive Conservative hold		Swing		11.54%
Source(s) Source: "Athabasca Official Results 1975 Alberta general election". Alberta Heritage Community Foundation.

=== 1979 ===
1979 Alberta general election
Party	Candidate	Votes	%	±%
Progressive Conservative	Frank Pierpoint Appleby	4,153	55.46%	-4.42%
New Democratic	Peter Opryshko	1,792	23.93%	-3.19%
Social Credit	Ernest W. Maser	989	13.21%	3.85%
Liberal	Robert Blain Logan	554	7.40%	3.76%
Total		7,488	–	–
Rejected, spoiled and declined		N/A	–	–
Eligible electors / turnout		11,071	67.64%	-2.33
Progressive Conservative hold		Swing		-0.62%
Source(s) Source: "Athabasca Official Results 1979 Alberta general election". Alberta Heritage Community Foundation.

=== 1982 ===
1982 Alberta general election
Party	Candidate	Votes	%	±%
Progressive Conservative	Frank Pierpoint Appleby	5,342	57.07%	1.61%
New Democratic	Ed Caraher	1,952	20.85%	-3.07%
Western Canada Concept	Con Sehn	1,538	16.43%	–
Social Credit	Adam Hauch	529	5.65%	-1.75%
Total		9,361	–	–
Rejected, spoiled and declined		18	–	–
Eligible electors / turnout		12,087	77.60%	9.94%
Progressive Conservative hold		Swing		2.34%
Source(s) Source: "Athabasca Official Results 1982 Alberta general election". Alberta Heritage Community Foundation.

== Plebiscite results ==
=== 1948 electrification plebiscite ===
District results from the first province wide plebiscite on electricity regulation:

Option A	Option B
Are you in favour of the generation and distribution of electricity being continued by the Power Companies?	Are you in favour of the generation and distribution of electricity being made a publicly owned utility administered by the Alberta Government Power Commission?
1,262 29.08%	3,077 70.92%
Province wide result: Option A passed.

=== 1957 liquor plebiscite ===
1957 Alberta liquor plebiscite results: Athabasca
Question A: Do you approve additional types of outlets for the sale of beer, wine and spirituous liquor subject to a local vote?
Ballot choice	Votes	%
Yes	1,161	64.11%
No	650	35.89%
Total votes	1,811	100%
Rejected, spoiled and declined	62	
5,774 eligible electors, turnout 32.44%

On October 30, 1957, a stand-alone plebiscite was held province wide in all 50 of the then current provincial electoral districts in Alberta. The government decided to consult Alberta voters to decide on liquor sales and mixed drinking after a divisive debate in the legislature. The plebiscite was intended to deal with the growing demand for reforming antiquated liquor control laws.

The plebiscite was conducted in two parts. Question A, asked in all districts, asked the voters if the sale of liquor should be expanded in Alberta, while Question B, asked in a handful of districts within the corporate limits of Calgary and Edmonton, asked if men and women should be allowed to drink together in establishments.

Province wide Question A of the plebiscite passed in 33 of the 50 districts while Question B passed in all five districts. Athbasca voted by a large majority in favor of the issue. The district recorded one of the lowest turnouts, well below the province wide 46% average.

Official district returns were released to the public on December 31, 1957. The Social Credit government in power at the time did not consider the results binding. However, the results of the vote led the government to repeal all existing liquor legislation and introduce an entirely new Liquor Act.

Municipal districts lying inside electoral districts that voted against the plebiscite were designated Local Option Zones by the Alberta Liquor Control Board and considered effective dry zones. Business owners who wanted a licence had to petition for a binding municipal plebiscite in order to be granted a licence.

== By-elections and member party changes ==
- September 27, 1918 — Appointment of Alexander Grant MacKay as the Minister of Municipal Affairs
- June 3, 1920 — Death of Alexander Grant MacKay
- November 4, 1935 — Resignation of Clarence Tade to provide a seat for Minister Charles Cathmer Ross
- November 7, 1938 — Death of Charles Cathmer Ross
- 1921 - 1926 — George Mills became an Independent Liberal (date not available).
- 1926 - 1930 — John W. Frame crossed the floor from the Liberals to the United Farmers of Alberta (date not available).

== See also ==
- List of Alberta provincial electoral districts
- Canadian provincial electoral districts
- Athabaska, a federal electoral district in Alberta that was represented in the House of Commons of Canada from 1925 to 1968
