= Wetaskiwin (territorial electoral district) =

Former territorial electoral district in the North-West Territories, Canada

Wetaskiwin was a territorial electoral district in the North-West Territories from 1898 to 1905. At the time of its creation it included the city of Wetaskiwin, Alberta and surrounding rural region. After the province of Alberta split from the North-West Territories in 1905, Wetaskiwin would continue to exist as a district until 1971.

No election ever took place as both elections were uncontested and thus decided by acclamations. Anthony Sigwart de Rosenroll won both times.

== Election Results 1898–1902 ==
Wetaskiwin elected members to the Legislative Assembly of the Northwest Territories. from 1898 to 1902. The members it elected were:

1898 North-West Territories general election
Party	Candidate	Votes
Independent	Anthony Rosenroll	Acclaimed

1902 North-West Territories general election
Party	Candidate	Votes
Liberal–Conservative	Anthony Rosenroll	Acclaimed

== See also ==
- List of Northwest Territories territorial electoral districts
- Canadian provincial electoral districts
- Wetaskiwin Federal electoral district
