= Wetaskiwin (provincial electoral district) =

Defunct provincial electoral district in Alberta

Alberta electoral district

Defunct provincial electoral district
- Legislature: Legislative Assembly of Alberta
- District created: 1905
- District abolished: 1971
- First contested: 1905
- Last contested: 1967

Wetaskiwin was a provincial electoral district in Alberta, Canada, mandated to return a single member to the Legislative Assembly of Alberta from 1905 to 1971.

== History ==
The Wetaskiwin electoral district was one of the original 25 electoral districts contested in the 1905 Alberta general election upon Alberta joining Confederation in September 1905. The district was carried over from the old Wetaskiwin electoral district which returned a single member to the Legislative Assembly of the Northwest Territories from 1898 to 1905.

Liberal candidate Anthony Rosenroll who was the incumbent in the previous Northwest Territories' Legislature since 1891 was the first member elected for the Wetaskiwin electoral district.

=== Members of the Legislative Assembly (MLAs) ===
Members of the Legislative Assembly for Wetaskiwin
Assembly	Years	Member	Party
1st	1905–1909	Anthony Rosenroll	Liberal
2nd	1909–1913	Charles H. Olin	Liberal
3rd	1913–1914	Charles H. Olin	Liberal
3rd	1914–1917	Hugh John Montgomery	Liberal
4th	1917–1921	Hugh John Montgomery	Liberal
5th	1921–1926	Evert E. Sparks	United Farmers
6th	1926–1930	Evert E. Sparks	United Farmers
7th	1930–1935	Hugh John Montgomery	Liberal
8th	1935–1940	John A. Wingblade	Social Credit
9th	1940–1944	John A. Wingblade	Social Credit
10th	1944–1948	John A. Wingblade	Social Credit
11th	1948–1952	John A. Wingblade	Social Credit
12th	1952–1955	John A. Wingblade	Social Credit
13th	1955–1959	John A. Wingblade	Social Credit
14th	1959–1963	John A. Wingblade	Social Credit
15th	1963–1967	Albert W. Strohschein	Social Credit
16th	1967–1971	Albert W. Strohschein	Social Credit

== Legislative election results ==
=== 1905 ===
1905 Alberta general election
Party	Candidate	Votes	%
Liberal	A.L. Rosenroll [sic]	552	66.51%
Conservative	R.W. Angus	278	33.49%
Total		830	
Liberal pickup new district.			
Source(s) Source: "Wetaskiwin Official Results 1905 Alberta general election". Alberta Heritage Community Foundation.

The Returning Officer for the 1905 election was James Kennedy Burgess

=== 1909 ===
Liberal Charles H. Olin defeated Conservative James George Anderson in the 1909 election. Anderson previously contested the 1908 Canadian federal election in the Strathcona district as an independent.

1909 Alberta general election
Party	Candidate	Votes	%	±%
Liberal	Charles H. Olin	713	59.82%	-6.69%
Conservative	James George Anderson	479	40.18%	6.69%
Total		1,192	–	–
Rejected, spoiled and declined		N/A	–	–
Eligible electors / Turnout		N/A	N/A	–
Liberal hold		Swing		-6.69%
Source(s) Source: "Wetaskiwin Official Results 1909 Alberta general election". Alberta Heritage Community Foundation.

=== 1913 ===
1913 Alberta general election
Party	Candidate	Votes	%	±%
Liberal	Charles H. Olin	780	57.35%	-2.46%
Conservative	George B. Campbell	580	42.65%	2.46%
Total		1,360	–	–
Rejected, spoiled and declined		N/A	–	–
Eligible electors / Turnout		N/A	N/A	–
Liberal hold		Swing		-2.46%
Source(s) Source: "Wetaskiwin Official Results 1913 Alberta general election". Alberta Heritage Community Foundation.

=== 1914 by-election ===
Alberta provincial by-election, November 17, 1914 Upon the death of Charles H. Olin on October 4, 1914
Party	Candidate	Votes	%	±%
Liberal	Hugh John Montgomery	990	66.94%	9.59%
Conservative	F. B. Watson	489	33.06%	-9.59%
Total		1,479	–	–
Rejected, spoiled and declined		N/A	–	–
Eligible electors / turnout		N/A	N/A	–
Liberal hold		Swing		9.59%
Source(s) "Historical Results: By-elections". elections.ab.ca. Elections Alberta.

=== 1917 ===
1917 Alberta general election
Party	Candidate	Votes	%	±%
Liberal	Hugh John Montgomery	1,500	68.71%	11.36%
Conservative	Robert MacLachlan Angus	683	31.29%	-11.36%
Total		2,183	–	–
Rejected, spoiled and declined		N/A	–	–
Eligible electors / Turnout		N/A	N/A	–
Liberal hold		Swing		11.36%
Source(s) Source: "Wetaskiwin Official Results 1917 Alberta general election". Alberta Heritage Community Foundation.

=== 1921 ===
1921 Alberta general election
Party	Candidate	Votes	%	±%
United Farmers	Evert E. Sparks	1,508	55.36%	–
Liberal	Hugh John Montgomery	1,216	44.64%	-24.07%
Total		2,724	–	–
Rejected, spoiled and declined		N/A	–	–
Eligible electors / Turnout		3,345	81.43%	–
United Farmers gain from Liberal		Swing		-13.35%
Source(s) Source: "Wetaskiwin Official Results 1921 Alberta general election". Alberta Heritage Community Foundation.

=== 1926 ===
1926 Alberta general election
Party	Candidate	Votes 1st count	%	Votes final count	±%
United Farmers	Evert E. Sparks	1,274	46.16%	1,418	-9.20%
Liberal	Hugh John Montgomery	1,198	43.41%	1,266	-1.23%
Conservative	J.F. Inglis	288	10.43%	–	–
Total		2,760	–	–	–
Rejected, spoiled and declined		139	–	–	–
Eligible electors / Turnout		3,617	80.15%	-1.29%	–
United Farmers hold		Swing		-3.98%	
Source(s) Source: "Wetaskiwin Official Results 1926 Alberta general election". Alberta Heritage Community Foundation. Instant-runoff voting requires a candidate to receive a plurality (greater than 50%) of the votes. As no candidate received a plurality of votes, the bottom candidate was eliminated and their 2nd place votes were applied to both other candidates until one received a plurality.

=== 1930 ===
1930 Alberta general election
Party	Candidate	Votes	%	±%
Liberal	Hugh John Montgomery	1,713	54.73%	11.32%
United Farmers	Evert E. Sparks	1,417	45.27%	-0.89%
Total		3,130	–	–
Rejected, spoiled and declined		1	–	–
Eligible electors / Turnout		4,040	77.50%	-2.65%
Liberal gain from United Farmers		Swing		3.35%
Source(s) Source: "Wetaskiwin Official Results 1930 Alberta general election". Alberta Heritage Community Foundation.

=== 1935 ===
1935 Alberta general election
Party	Candidate	Votes	%	±%
Social Credit	John A. Wingblade	2,762	58.21%	–
Liberal	Hugh John Montgomery	1,149	24.21%	-30.51%
United Farmers	W. Stevens	506	10.66%	-34.61%
Conservative	R. H. Inglis	187	3.94%	–
Communist	A. E. Bolton	141	2.97%	–
Total		4,745	–	–
Rejected, spoiled and declined		117	–	–
Eligible electors / Turnout		5,671	85.73%	8.23%
Social Credit gain from Liberal		Swing		12.27%
Source(s) Source: "Wetaskiwin Official Results 1935 Alberta general election". Alberta Heritage Community Foundation.

=== 1940 ===
1940 Alberta general election
Party	Candidate	Votes 1st count	%	Votes final count	±%
Social Credit	John A. Wingblade	2,480	47.19%	2,761	-11.02%
Independent	T. S. Steedman	1,874	35.66%	2,179	–
Co-operative Commonwealth	H. G. Young	901	17.15%	–	–
Total		5,255	–	–	–
Rejected, spoiled and declined		77	–	–	–
Eligible electors / Turnout		7,412	71.94%	-13.80%	–
Social Credit hold		Swing		-11.23%	
Source(s) Source: "Wetaskiwin Official Results 1940 Alberta general election". Alberta Heritage Community Foundation. Instant-runoff voting requires a candidate to receive a plurality (greater than 50%) of the votes. As no candidate received a plurality of votes, the bottom candidate was eliminated and their 2nd place votes were applied to both other candidates until one received a plurality.

=== 1944 ===
1944 Alberta general election
Party	Candidate	Votes	%	±%
Social Credit	John A. Wingblade	2,700	52.63%	5.44%
Co-operative Commonwealth	J. G. Baker	1,259	24.54%	7.40%
Independent	Hugh John Montgomery	1,007	19.63%	-16.03%
Labor-Progressive	David Graham	164	3.20%	–
Total		5,130	–	–
Rejected, spoiled and declined		115	–	–
Eligible electors / Turnout		6,827	76.83%	4.89%
Social Credit hold		Swing		8.28%
Source(s) Source: "Wetaskiwin Official Results 1944 Alberta general election". Alberta Heritage Community Foundation.

=== 1948 ===
1948 Alberta general election
Party	Candidate	Votes	%	±%
Social Credit	John A. Wingblade	2,827	51.65%	-0.98%
Liberal	Morley Merner	1,414	25.84%	–
Co-operative Commonwealth	Henry Young	1,232	22.51%	-2.03%
Total		5,473	–	–
Rejected, spoiled and declined		215	–	–
Eligible electors / Turnout		7,507	75.77%	-1.06%
Social Credit hold		Swing		-1.14%
Source(s) Source: "Wetaskiwin Official Results 1948 Alberta general election". Alberta Heritage Community Foundation.

=== 1952 ===
1952 Alberta general election
Party	Candidate	Votes	%	±%
Social Credit	John A. Wingblade	2,664	54.12%	2.47%
Co-operative Commonwealth	Harry Van Dyke	1,029	20.91%	–
Liberal	William W. Draayer	1,029	20.91%	–
Independent Social Credit	Arnold D. Olsen	200	4.06%	–
Total		4,922	–	–
Rejected, spoiled and declined		354	–	–
Eligible electors / Turnout		7,914	66.67%	-9.10%
Social Credit hold		Swing		N/A
Source(s) Source: "Wetaskiwin Official Results 1952 Alberta general election". Alberta Heritage Community Foundation.

=== 1955 ===
1955 Alberta general election
Party	Candidate	Votes 1st count	%	Votes final count	±%
Social Credit	John A. Wingblade	2,695	49.17%	2,756	-4.95%
Liberal	Ernest Oscar Larson	1,636	29.85%	1,731	8.94%
Co-operative Commonwealth	M. Jevne	892	16.27%	942	-4.63%
Conservative	W. C. Kimmel	258	4.71%	–	–
Total		5,481	–	–	–
Rejected, spoiled and declined		399	–	–	–
Eligible electors / Turnout		8,135	72.28%	5.61%	–
Social Credit hold		Swing		-6.95%	
Source(s) Source: "Wetaskiwin Official Results 1955 Alberta general election". Alberta Heritage Community Foundation. Instant-runoff voting requires a candidate to receive a plurality (greater than 50%) of the votes. As no candidate received a plurality of votes, the bottom candidate was eliminated and their 2nd place votes were applied to both other candidates until one received a plurality.

=== 1959 ===
1959 Alberta general election
Party	Candidate	Votes	%	±%
Social Credit	John A. Wingblade	3,352	58.27%	9.10%
Progressive Conservative	Robert D. Angus	1,010	17.56%	–
Co-operative Commonwealth	David Pat. Garland	749	13.02%	-3.26%
Liberal	Fred R. MacNaughton	642	11.16%	-18.69%
Total		5,753	–	–
Rejected, spoiled and declined		14	–	–
Eligible electors / Turnout		8,231	70.06%	-2.22%
Social Credit hold		Swing		10.69%
Source(s) Source: "Wetaskiwin Official Results 1959 Alberta general election". Alberta Heritage Community Foundation.

=== 1963 ===
1963 Alberta general election
Party	Candidate	Votes	%	±%
Social Credit	Albert W. Strohschein	3333	61.11%	2.85%
Liberal	Albert Dyberg	1298	23.80%	12.64%
New Democratic	Leslie Pritchard	823	15.09%	2.07%
Total		5,454	–	–
Rejected, spoiled and declined		9	–	–
Eligible electors / Turnout		8,601	63.52%	-6.55%
Social Credit hold		Swing		-1.70%
Source(s) Source: "Wetaskiwin Official Results 1963 Alberta general election". Alberta Heritage Community Foundation.

=== 1967 ===
1967 Alberta general election
Party	Candidate	Votes	%	±%
Social Credit	Albert W. Strohschein	2,879	45.79%	-15.32%
Progressive Conservative	Dallas Schmidt	2,408	38.30%	–
New Democratic	Robert P. Christensen	1,000	15.91%	0.82%
Total		6,287	–	–
Rejected, spoiled and declined		17	–	–
Eligible electors / Turnout		9,129	68.87%	–
Social Credit hold		Swing		-14.91%
Source(s) Source: "Wetaskiwin Official Results 1967 Alberta general election". Alberta Heritage Community Foundation.

== Plebiscite results ==
=== 1957 liquor plebiscite ===
1957 Alberta liquor plebiscite results: Wetaskiwin
Question A: Do you approve additional types of outlets for the sale of beer, wine and spirituous liquor subject to a local vote?
Ballot choice	Votes	%
No	1,892	51.62%
Yes	1,773	48.78%
Total votes	3,665	100%
Rejected, spoiled and declined	9	
7,650 eligible electors, turnout 48.03%

On October 30, 1957, a stand-alone plebiscite was held province wide in all 50 of the then current provincial electoral districts in Alberta. The government decided to consult Alberta voters to decide on liquor sales and mixed drinking after a divisive debate in the Legislature. The plebiscite was intended to deal with the growing demand for reforming antiquated liquor control laws.

The plebiscite was conducted in two parts. Question A asked in all districts, asked the voters if the sale of liquor should be expanded in Alberta, while Question B asked in a handful of districts within the corporate limits of Calgary and Edmonton asked if men and woman were allowed to drink together in establishments.

Province wide Question A of the plebiscite passed in 33 of the 50 districts while Question B passed in all five districts. Wetaskiwin was the only other city in Alberta aside from Lethbridge to vote against the proposal. The vote was nearly even with the No side winning by a slim margin. The voter turnout in the district was slightly above the province wide average of 46%.

Official district returns were released to the public on December 31, 1957. The Social Credit government in power at the time did not considered the results binding. However the results of the vote led the government to repeal all existing liquor legislation and introduce an entirely new Liquor Act.

Municipal districts lying inside electoral districts that voted against the Plebiscite such as Wetaskiwin were designated Local Option Zones by the Alberta Liquor Control Board and considered effective dry zones, business owners that wanted a license had to petition for a binding municipal plebiscite in order to be granted a license.

== See also ==
- List of Alberta provincial electoral districts
- Wetaskiwin, a city in Alberta, Canada
- Wetaskiwin (electoral district), a federal electoral district from 1925 to 2015
- Wetaskiwin (N.W.T. electoral district), a territorial electoral district from 1898 to 1905
