= Progressive Conservative Association of Alberta leadership elections =

This page lists the results of leadership elections held by the Progressive Conservative Association of Alberta or as it was known before 1958, the Conservatives.

== 1905 leadership convention ==
(Held on August 16, 1905)

- R.B. Bennett acclaimed

== Developments 1905-1923 ==
Bennett was defeated in the 1905 general election and Albert Robertson was chosen House leader. Robertson in turn was defeated in the 1909 general election. Afterwards, Bennett, who had been elected, became House leader. Bennett resigned in 1910 and Edward Michener became House leader on July 5. Michener resigned after the 1917 general election when he was appointed to the Senate. George Hoadley was chosen House leader on February 8, 1918. He was removed on February 17, 1920 in favour of James Ramsey. Ramsey was in turn ousted in 1921 in favour of Albert Ewing and the Conservative caucus was split. After the Conservative Party's disastrous performance in the 1921 general election the only Conservative left in the legislature was the independent John Smith Stewart.

== 1923 leadership convention ==
(Held on December 14, 1923)

- William John Blair acclaimed

R.B. Bennett, Albert Ewing, and Alexander McGillivray were nominated but declined.

== 1925 leadership convention ==
(Held on August 5, 1925)

- Alexander McGillivray acclaimed

== 1930 leadership convention ==
(Held on January 11, 1930)

- David Milwyn Duggan acclaimed

John Irwin and Charles Yardley Weaver were nominated but withdrew.

== Developments 1930-1958 ==
The Conservatives joined a united front with the Liberals in 1937 to defeat the Social Credit government and formed the Independent Movement. As such they stood no candidates in the 1940 election, the 1944 election, and the 1948 election. Duggan was re-elected as an independent in 1940 and died on May 4, 1942. The party was revived in the 1952 election and John Percy Page was chosen House leader afterwards.

== 1958 leadership convention ==
(Held on August 16, 1958)

First Ballot:

- William Cameron Kirby 150
- Alan Lazerte 106
- Ernest Watkins 69
- Ernest A. Toshach 40
- Gifford Main 30

Second Ballot:

- William Cameron Kirby 163
- Alan Lazerte 128
- Ernest Watkins 56
- Ernest A. Toshach 32
- Gifford Main 18

Third Ballot (Main eliminated):

- William Cameron Kirby 189
- Alan Lazerte 148
- Ernest Watkins 46
- Ernest A. Toshach 14

Fourth Ballot (Toshach eliminated):

- William Cameron Kirby 206
- Alan Lazerte 157
- Ernest Watkins 32

== 1962 leadership convention ==
(Held October 6, 1962)

- Milt Harradence elected
- Ernest A. Toshach
- Ernest Watkins eliminated on first ballot.

(Harradence elected on the second ballot by less than 20 votes. Harradence and Toshach were separated by only one vote on the first ballot. About 300 votes were cast in total. Vote totals were not released).

== 1965 leadership convention ==
(Held March 20, 1965)

- Peter Lougheed 300
- Duncan McKillop 30

Jon Scott withdrew before balloting.

== 1985 leadership convention ==
(Held on October 13, 1985)

First Ballot:

- Don Getty 913
- Julian Koziak 545
- Ron Ghitter 428

Second Ballot (Ghitter eliminated):

- Don Getty 1061
- Julian Koziak 827

== 1992 leadership election ==
First Ballot:

(Held on November 28, 1992)

Candidate	Votes	Percentage
Nancy Betkowski	16,393	31.10%
Ralph Klein	16,392	31.09%
Rick Orman	7,649	14.51%
Doug Main	5,053	9.59%
John Oldring	2,789	5.29%
Lloyd Quantz	1,488	2.82%
Ruben Nelson	1,250	2.37%
Elaine McCoy	1,115	2.12%
David King	587	1.11%
Total	52,716	100.00%

Second Ballot (Betkowski, Klein, Orman moved to next round and Orman withdrew November 29):

(Held on December 5, 1992)

Candidate	Votes	Percentage
Ralph Klein	46,245	59.10%
Nancy Betkowski	31,722	40.54%
Rick Orman	284	0.36%
Total	78,251	100.00%

== 2006 leadership election ==
First Ballot:

(Held on November 25, 2006)

Name	Votes	Percent
Jim Dinning	29,470	30.17%
Ted Morton	25,614	26.22%
Ed Stelmach	14,967	15.32%
Lyle Oberg	11,638	11.91%
Dave Hancock	7,595	7.77%
Mark Norris	6,789	6.95%
Victor Doerksen	873	0.89%
Gary McPherson	744	0.76%
Total	97,690	100.00%

Second Ballot (Dinning, Morton and Stelmach move to next round):

(Note: used a preferential ballot)

(Held on December 2, 2006)

	Second Ballot		Third Ballot	
Candidate	Votes	Percentage	Votes	Percentage
Ed Stelmach	51,764	35.88%	77,577	58.29%
Jim Dinning	51,282	35.54%	55,509	41.71%
Ted Morton	41,243	28.58%	Eliminated	
Total	144,289	100.00%	133,086	100.00%

On the third Ballot Morton was eliminated, and vote distributed.

== 2011 leadership election ==
=== First ballot ===
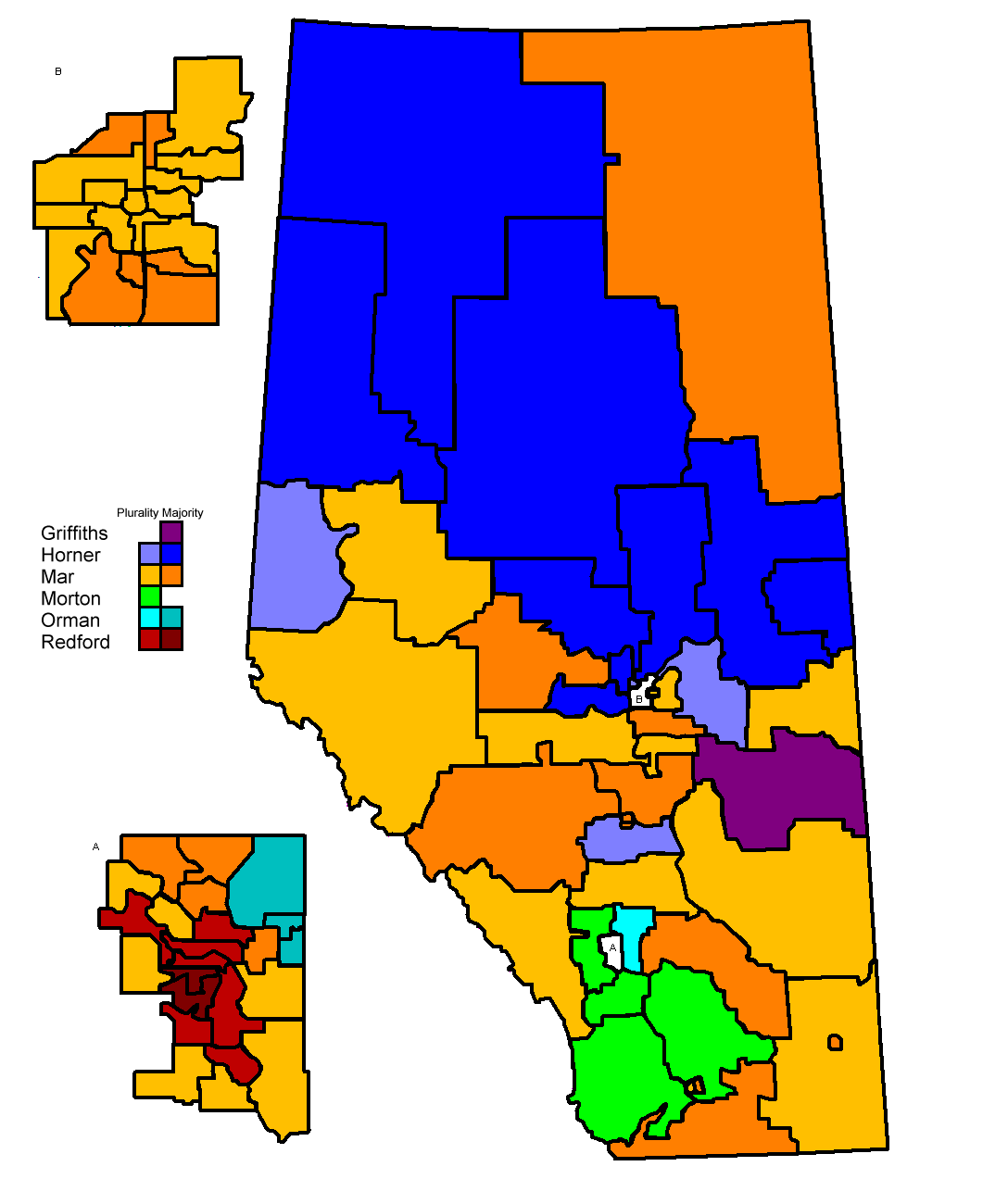
The leading candidate in each riding on the first ballot.

The first ballot was on September 17, 2011.

Candidate	Votes	Percentage
Gary Mar	24,195	40.76
Alison Redford	11,127	18.74
Doug Horner	8,635	14.55
Ted Morton	6,962	11.73
Rick Orman	6,005	10.12
Doug Griffiths	2,435	4.10
Total	59,359	100.00

Two days following the first ballot, Morton and Orman decided to endorse Mar. Griffiths followed the next day.

=== Second ballot ===
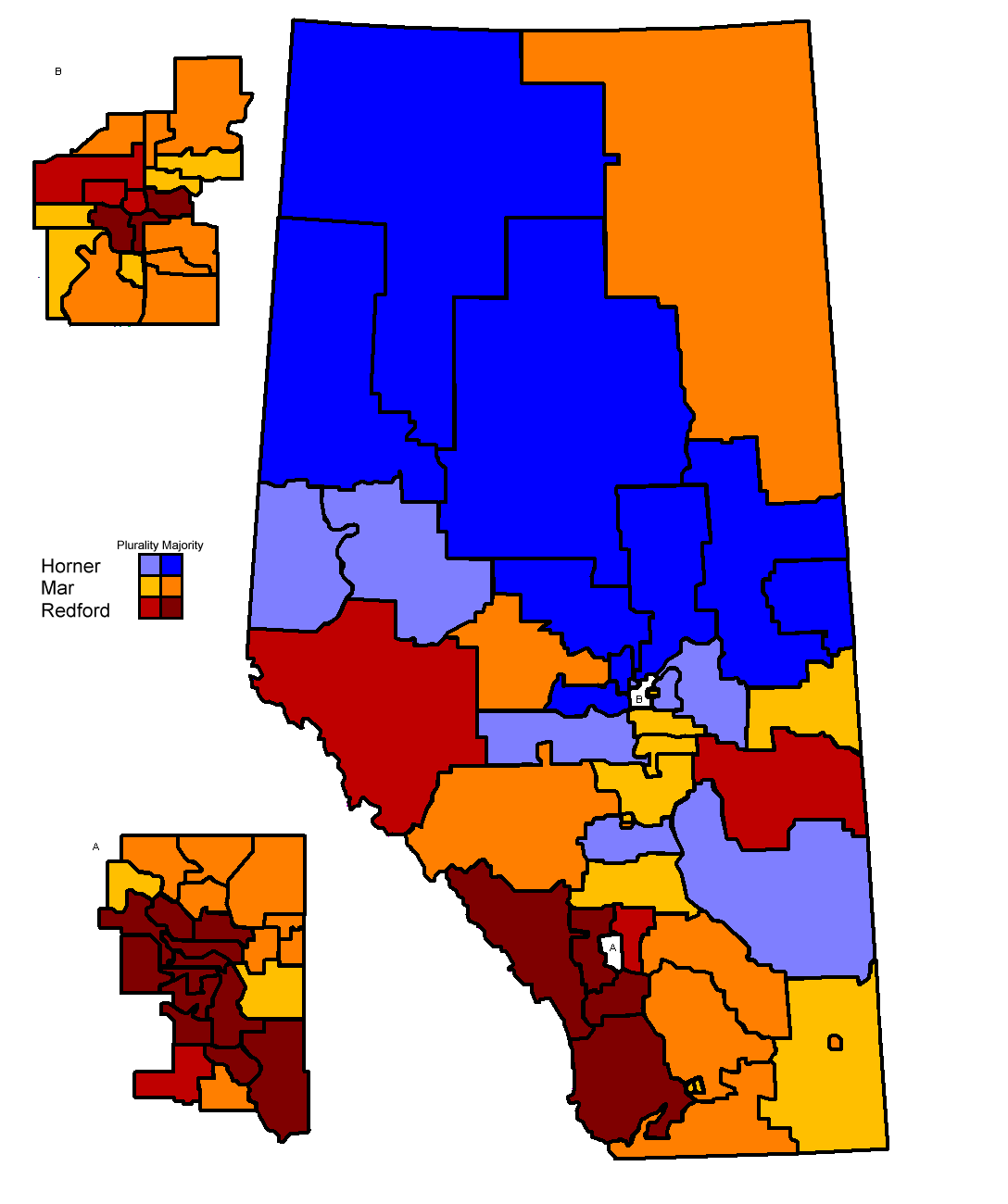
The leading candidate in each riding on the second ballot.

A preferential ballot was cast on October 1, 2011. Because no candidate received more than 50% of the vote on the first count, the third-place finisher was dropped, and the second preference votes cast on Horner's ballots were counted and added to the remaining candidate's totals. Mar led after the first round, and Horner was eliminated. After second preferences were applied, Redford was declared the winner.

Candidate	Round 1		Round 2	
Candidate	Votes	Percentage	Votes	Percentage
Alison Redford	28,993	37.09	37,101	51.11
Gary Mar	33,233	42.51	35,491	48.89
Doug Horner	15,950	20.40	Eliminated	
Total	78,176	100.00	72,592	100.00

== 2014 leadership election ==
(Held on September 6, 2014)

Candidate	Votes	Percentage
Jim Prentice	17,963	76.81
Ric McIver	2,742	11.72
Thomas Lukaszuk	2,681	11.46
Total	23,386	100.00

== 2017 leadership election ==
(Held March 18, 2017 at the Telus Convention Centre in Calgary)

Candidate	Votes	Percentage
Jason Kenney	1,113	75.4%
Richard Starke	323	21.9%
Byron Nelson	40	2.7%
Total	1,476	100%

Spoiled ballots: 3

== See also ==
- Leadership convention
- Progressive Conservative Association of Alberta
