= Red Deer (provincial electoral district) =

Defunct provincial electoral district in Alberta, Canada

Coordinates: 52.271°N 113.813°W

Alberta electoral district

Defunct provincial electoral district
- Legislature: Legislative Assembly of Alberta
- District created: 1905
- District abolished: 1986
- First contested: 1905
- Last contested: 1982

Red Deer was a provincial electoral district in Alberta, Canada, mandated to return a single member to the Legislative Assembly of Alberta from 1905 to 1986.

The district was split into Red Deer North and Red Deer South in 1986.

== History ==
An antecedent Red Deer district had existed in the North-West Territories (NWT) that covered much of central Alberta. It was split into Innisfail and Lacombe for the 1902 NWT general election. Upon Alberta becoming a province in September 1905, a smaller Red Deer provincial district was created between Lacombe and Innisfail.

From 1924 to 1956, the district used instant-runoff voting to elect its MLA.

By the 1980s the city had grown too large to be represented by one member, and Red Deer was split into Red Deer North and Red Deer South.

=== Members of the Legislative Assembly (MLAs) ===
MLAs for Red Deer
| Assembly | Years | Member | Party |
|---|---|---|---|
See Innisfail and Lacombe 1902-1905
| 1st | 1905–1909 | John Moore | Liberal |
| 2nd | 1909–1910 | Edward Michener | Independent |
| 2nd | 1910–1913 | Edward Michener | Conservative |
| 3rd | 1913–1917 | Edward Michener | Conservative |
| 4th | 1917–1918 | Edward Michener | Conservative |
| 4th | 1918 | Vacant | |
| 4th | 1918–1921 | John Gaetz | Liberal |
| 5th | 1921–1926 | George Smith | United Farmers |
| 6th | 1926–1930 | George Smith | United Farmers |
| 7th | 1930–1931 | George Smith | United Farmers |
| 7th | 1931 | Vacant | |
| 7th | 1931–1935 | William Payne | Conservative |
| 8th | 1935–1940 | Alfred Hooke | Social Credit |
| 9th | 1940–1943 | Alfred Speakman | Unity Movement |
| 9th | 1943 | Vacant | |
| 9th | 1943–1944 | David Ure | Social Credit |
| 10th | 1944–1948 | David Ure | Social Credit |
| 11th | 1948–1952 | David Ure | Social Credit |
| 12th | 1952–1953 | David Ure | Social Credit |
| 12th | 1953–1954 | Vacant | |
| 12th | 1954–1955 | Cam Kirby | Conservative |
| 13th | 1955–1959 | Cam Kirby | Conservative |
| 13th | 1959 | Cam Kirby | Progressive Conservative |
| 14th | 1959–1963 | William Ure | Social Credit |
| 15th | 1963–1967 | William Ure | Social Credit |
| 16th | 1967–1971 | William Ure | Social Credit |
| 17th | 1971–1975 | James Foster | Progressive Conservative |
| 18th | 1975–1979 | James Foster | Progressive Conservative |
| 19th | 1979–1982 | Norman Magee | Progressive Conservative |
| 20th | 1982–1986 | Jim McPherson | Progressive Conservative |
See Red Deer North and Red Deer South 1986–present

Red Deer elected Liberal candidate John Moore as its first MLA in 1905 over the town's founder, Leonard Gaetz. However, he was defeated in 1909 by independent conservative candidate Edward Michener. Socialist candidate Donald McClure finished third.

Michener crossed the floor to the Conservative Party in 1910, becoming party leader and Leader of the Opposition. As party leader, he presided over a revival in Conservative fortunes in the 1913 election, but after losing to the Liberals again in 1917 he stepped down as leader. Prime Minister Robert Borden appointed him to the Senate in 1918, vacating the seat for Red Deer.

The ensuing by-election saw Leonard Gaetz's son, John Gaetz, running for the Liberals and, unlike his father, triumphed over the Conservative candidate. He served the rest of the term but was defeated in the 1921 election by United Farmers candidate and former mayor of Red Deer George Smith.

From 1924 to 1956, the district used instant-runoff voting to elect its MLA.

Smith defended the seat in the 1926 and 1930 elections despite strong challenges from Gaetz and Conservative candidate William Ernest Payne. Smith died suddenly in 1931, and again the seat was vacated. Payne captured the Red Deer seat for the Conservatives in the resulting by-election.

The 1935 election saw "Bible Bill" Aberhart's Social Credit sweep into power unexpectedly, with Alfred Hooke defeating Payne in Red Deer. In 1940, Hooke chose to run in the new Rocky Mountain House district. He won the seat and stayed on as MLA until the defeat of the Social Credit government in 1971, serving in various cabinet positions.

Thus in 1940 the incumbent MLA was running elsewhere. Former Red Deer UFA MP Alfred Speakman was jointly endorsed by the Liberals and Conservatives as an anti-SC candidate in what became known as the Independent Citizen's Association or the Unity League. Officially running as an independent on the ballot, Speakman defeated the Social Credit candidate to win the seat. He became the fifth member for Red Deer to serve only one term upon his death in 1943.

Social Credit candidate David Ure won the seat back for the SC government in a by-election in late 1943. He served three terms as MLA and Agriculture Minister until he, too, was killed by a traffic accident in 1953.

Conservative Cam Kirby picked the seat up in a 1954 by-election (defeating David Ure's younger brother, William Ure), and was re-elected in 1955. Despite winning the leadership of the newly renamed Progressive Conservatives, however, Kirby lost to William Ure in 1959.

The younger Ure served as Red Deer MLA for three terms. Due to a boundary redistribution in 1971, he ran for re-election in Innisfail, but Social Credit lost both seats as the Progressive Conservatives swept to power. James Foster became MLA for Red Deer with the new government, and served two terms.

When Foster retired in 1979, Norman Magee defended the seat for the PCs, becoming the first Red Deer MLA from the same political party as his predecessor. Magee retired after one term and Jim McPherson served the final term for Red Deer before it was split in two in 1986. The new districts, Red Deer North and Red Deer South, continued to elect PC candidates until 2015, when both were won by the New Democrats.

== Election results ==
=== 1905 ===
The returning officer was Frank L. Farley.

1905 Alberta general election
| Party | Candidate | Votes | % | ±% |
|---|---|---|---|---|
| Liberal | John Thomas Moore | 524 | 48.03% | – |
| Conservative | Leonard Gaetz | 479 | 43.90% | – |
| Independent | Alexander D. McKenzie | 88 | 8.07% | – |
| Total | | 1,091 | – | – |
| Rejected, spoiled and declined | | N/A | – | – |
| Eligible electors / turnout | | 1,091 | N/A | – |
| Liberal pickup new district. | | | | |
Source(s) Source: "Red Deer Official Results 1905 Alberta general election". Alberta Heritage Community Foundation.

=== 1909 ===
1909 Alberta general election
| Party | Candidate | Votes | % | ±% |
|---|---|---|---|---|
| Conservative | Edward Michener | 657 | 51.29% | 7.38% |
| Liberal | John Thomas Moore | 494 | 38.56% | -9.47% |
| Independent | Donald McClure | 130 | 10.15% | 2.08% |
| Total | | 1,281 | – | – |
| Rejected, spoiled and declined | | N/A | – | – |
| Eligible electors / turnout | | 1,728 | 74.13% | -25.87% |
| Conservative gain from Liberal | | Swing | | 4.30% |
Source(s) Source: "Red Deer Official Results 1909 Alberta general election". Alberta Heritage Community Foundation.

=== 1913 ===
1913 Alberta general election
| Party | Candidate | Votes | % | ±% |
|---|---|---|---|---|
| Conservative | Edward Michener | 869 | 46.92% | -4.37% |
| Liberal | Robert B. Welliver | 786 | 42.44% | 3.88% |
| Independent | George Patton | 197 | 10.64% | 0.49% |
| Total | | 1,852 | – | – |
| Rejected, spoiled and declined | | N/A | – | – |
| Eligible electors / turnout | | 2,497 | 74.17% | 0.04% |
| Conservative hold | | Swing | | -4.12% |
Source(s) Source: "Red Deer Official Results 1913 Alberta general election". Alberta Heritage Community Foundation.

=== 1917 ===
1917 Alberta general election
| Party | Candidate | Votes | % | ±% |
|---|---|---|---|---|
| Conservative | Edward Michener | 1,295 | 45.68% | -1.24% |
| Liberal | Robert B. Welliver | 1,272 | 44.87% | 2.43% |
| Independent | George Paton | 268 | 9.45% | -1.18% |
| Total | | 2,835 | – | – |
| Rejected, spoiled and declined | | N/A | – | – |
| Eligible electors / turnout | | 0 | N/A | |
| Conservative hold | | Swing | | -1.84% |
Source(s) Source: "Red Deer Official Results 1917 Alberta general election". Alberta Heritage Community Foundation.

=== 1918 by-election ===
Alberta provincial by-election, October 28, 1918 Upon appointment of Edward Michener to the Senate
| Party | Candidate | Votes | % | ±% |
|---|---|---|---|---|
| Liberal | John J. Gaetz | 1,746 | 66.82% | 21.95% |
| Conservative | F. W. Galbraith | 867 | 33.18% | 12.50% |
| Total | | 2,613 | – | – |
| Rejected, spoiled and declined | | N/A | – | – |
| Eligible electors / turnout | | N/A | N/A | – |
| Liberal hold | | Swing | | – |
Source(s) "By-elections". elections.ab.ca. Elections Alberta.

=== 1921 ===
1921 Alberta general election
| Party | Candidate | Votes | % | ±% |
|---|---|---|---|---|
| United Farmers | George Wilbert Smith | 2,192 | 70.69% | – |
| Liberal | John J. Gaetz | 909 | 29.31% | -15.55% |
| Total | | 3,101 | – | – |
| Rejected, spoiled and declined | | N/A | – | – |
| Eligible electors / turnout | | 4,793 | 64.70% | |
| United Farmers gain from Conservative | | Swing | | 20.28% |
Source(s) Source: "Red Deer Official Results 1921 Alberta general election". Alberta Heritage Community Foundation.

=== 1926 ===
1926 Alberta general election
| Party | Candidate | Votes | % | ±% |
|---|---|---|---|---|
First count
| United Farmers | George Wilbert Smith | 1450 | 42.65% | -28.04% |
| Conservative | William Ernest Payne | 1329 | 39.09% | – |
| Liberal | John J. Gaetz | 621 | 18.26% | -11.05% |
| Total | | 3400 | – | – |
Ballot transfer results
| United Farmers | George Wilbert Smith | 1,641 | 51.85% | – |
| Conservative | William Ernest Payne | 1,524 | 48.15% | – |
| Total | | 3,165 | – | – |
| Rejected, spoiled and declined | | 141 | – | – |
| Eligible electors / turnout | | 5021 | 70.52% | 5.83% |
| United Farmers hold | | Swing | | -18.91% |
Source(s) Source: "Red Deer Official Results 1926 Alberta general election". Alberta Heritage Community Foundation.

=== 1930 ===
1930 Alberta general election
| Party | Candidate | Votes | % | ±% |
|---|---|---|---|---|
| United Farmers | George Wilbert Smith | 2,144 | 51.05% | -43.12% |
| Conservative | William Ernest Payne | 2,056 | 48.95% | -37.96% |
| Total | | 4,200 | – | – |
| Rejected, spoiled and declined | | 120 | – | – |
| Eligible electors / turnout | | 5,654 | 76.41% | -54.34% |
| United Farmers hold | | Swing | | -0.77% |
Source(s) Source: "Red Deer Official Results 1930 Alberta general election". Alberta Heritage Community Foundation.

=== 1935 ===
1935 Alberta general election
| Party | Candidate | Votes | % | ±% |
|---|---|---|---|---|
| Social Credit | Alfred J. Hooke | 3,565 | 60.65% | – |
| Liberal | M. H. W. Fizzell | 788 | 13.41% | – |
| Independent | Edgar G. Johns | 622 | 10.58% | – |
| Conservative | William Ernest Payne | 612 | 10.41% | -38.54% |
| Communist | G. H. Palmer | 291 | 4.95% | – |
| Total | | 5,878 | – | – |
| Rejected, spoiled and declined | | 159 | – | – |
| Eligible electors / turnout | | 7,049 | 85.64% | 9.24% |
| Social Credit gain from United Farmers | | Swing | | 22.57% |
Source(s) Source: "Red Deer Official Results 1935 Alberta general election". Alberta Heritage Community Foundation.

=== 1940 ===
1940 Alberta general election
| Party | Candidate | Votes | % | ±% |
|---|---|---|---|---|
First count
| Independent | Alfred Speakman | 2,760 | 47.47% | 36.89% |
| Social Credit | J. H. McCulloch | 2,083 | 35.83% | -24.82% |
| Independent Progressive | Alban E. MacLellan | 971 | 16.70% | – |
| Total | | 5,814 | – | – |
Ballot transfer results
| Independent | Alfred Speakman | 3,142 | 57.42% | – |
| Social Credit | J. H. McCulloch | 2,330 | 42.58% | – |
| Total | | 5,472 | – | – |
| Rejected, spoiled and declined | | 181 | – | – |
| Eligible electors / turnout | | 7718 | 77.68% | -7.97% |
| Independent gain from Social Credit | | Swing | | -17.80% |
Source(s) Source: "Red Deer Official Results 1940 Alberta general election". Alberta Heritage Community Foundation.

=== 1943 by-election ===
| December 18, 1943 by-election | | | | | Turnout % | |
| Affiliation | Candidate | 1st | % | Votes | % | Count |
| Social Credit | David Ure | 2,110 | 38.23% | 2,539 | 57.20% | 2nd |
| Independent | Wilfred J. Edgar | 2,042 | 36.99% | 2,354 | 42.80% | 2nd |
| Cooperative Commonwealth | E.P. Johns | 1,368 | 24.78% | Eliminated 2nd | | |
| Valid Ballots | | 5,520 | 100% | 4,839 | 100% | |
| Exhausted Ballots | | | | 627 | 2 Counts | |

=== 1944 ===
1944 Alberta general election
| Party | Candidate | Votes | % | ±% |
|---|---|---|---|---|
| Social Credit | David A. Ure | 3,012 | 51.58% | 15.75% |
| Independent | Wilfred J. Edgar | 1,545 | 26.46% | – |
| Co-operative Commonwealth | D. C. Dandell | 1,282 | 21.96% | – |
| Total | | 5,839 | – | – |
| Rejected, spoiled and declined | | 109 | – | – |
| Eligible electors / turnout | | 8,139 | 73.08% | -4.60% |
| Social Credit gain from Independent | | Swing | | 12.56% |
Source(s) Source: "Red Deer Official Results 1944 Alberta general election". Alberta Heritage Community Foundation.

=== 1948 ===
1948 Alberta general election
| Party | Candidate | Votes | % | ±% |
|---|---|---|---|---|
| Social Credit | David A. Ure | 4,771 | 81.51% | 29.93% |
| Co-operative Commonwealth | Auburn C. Pye | 1,082 | 18.49% | -3.47% |
| Total | | 5,853 | – | – |
| Rejected, spoiled and declined | | N/A | – | – |
| Eligible electors / turnout | | 6,794 | 86.15% | 13.07% |
| Social Credit hold | | Swing | | 18.95% |
Source(s) Source: "Red Deer Official Results 1948 Alberta general election". Alberta Heritage Community Foundation.

=== 1952 ===
1952 Alberta general election
| Party | Candidate | Votes | % | ±% |
|---|---|---|---|---|
| Social Credit | David A. Ure | 4,907 | 76.64% | -4.88% |
| Co-operative Commonwealth | Aubrun C. Pye | 1,496 | 23.36% | 4.88% |
| Total | | 6,403 | – | – |
| Rejected, spoiled and declined | | 303 | – | – |
| Eligible electors / turnout | | 11,407 | 58.79% | -27.36% |
| Social Credit hold | | Swing | | -4.88% |
Source(s) Source: "Red Deer Official Results 1952 Alberta general election". Alberta Heritage Community Foundation.

=== 1955 ===
1955 Alberta general election
| Party | Candidate | Votes | % | ±% |
|---|---|---|---|---|
First count
| Conservative | Cam Kirby | 4,381 | 47.68% | – |
| Social Credit | William K. Ure | 4,170 | 45.39% | -31.25% |
| Co-operative Commonwealth | Auburn C. Pye | 637 | 6.93% | -16.43% |
| Total | | 9,188 | – | – |
Ballot transfer results
| Conservative | Cam Kirby | 4,786 | 52.76% | – |
| Social Credit | William K. Ure | 4,286 | 47.24% | – |
| Total | | 7,072 | – | – |
| Rejected, spoiled and declined | | 449 | – | – |
| Eligible electors / turnout | | 13723 | 70.23% | 11.44% |
| Conservative gain from Social Credit | | Swing | | -25.49% |
Source(s) Source: "Red Deer Official Results 1955 Alberta general election". Alberta Heritage Community Foundation.

=== 1959 ===
1959 Alberta general election
| Party | Candidate | Votes | % | ±% |
|---|---|---|---|---|
| Social Credit | William K. Ure | 6,691 | 63.80% | 18.41% |
| Progressive Conservative | Cam Kirby | 3,797 | 36.20% | – |
| Total | | 10,488 | – | – |
| Rejected, spoiled and declined | | 31 | – | – |
| Eligible electors / turnout | | 15,660 | 67.17% | -3.05% |
| Social Credit gain from Conservative | | Swing | | 12.65% |
Source(s) Source: "Red Deer Official Results 1959 Alberta general election". Alberta Heritage Community Foundation.

=== 1963 ===
1963 Alberta general election
| Party | Candidate | Votes | % | ±% |
|---|---|---|---|---|
| Social Credit | William K. Ure | 6,016 | 57.88% | -5.92% |
| Progressive Conservative | Walter M. Ogilvie | 3,323 | 31.97% | -4.23% |
| Liberal | Denis Yunker | 609 | 5.86% | – |
| New Democratic | Herman H. Dorin | 446 | 4.29% | – |
| Total | | 10,394 | – | – |
| Rejected, spoiled and declined | | 55 | – | – |
| Eligible electors / turnout | | 18,625 | 56.10% | -11.07% |
| Social Credit hold | | Swing | | -0.84% |
Source(s) Source: "Red Deer Official Results 1963 Alberta general election". Alberta Heritage Community Foundation.

=== 1967 ===
1967 Alberta general election
| Party | Candidate | Votes | % | ±% |
|---|---|---|---|---|
| Social Credit | William K. Ure | 6,166 | 46.61% | -11.27% |
| Progressive Conservative | James L. Foster | 4,628 | 34.98% | 3.01% |
| New Democratic | Ethel Taylor | 1,799 | 13.60% | 7.74% |
| Liberal | Len Patterson | 636 | 4.81% | -5.34% |
| Total | | 13,229 | – | – |
| Rejected, spoiled and declined | | 55 | – | – |
| Eligible electors / turnout | | 19,677 | 67.51% | 11.41% |
| Social Credit hold | | Swing | | -7.14% |
Source(s) Source: "Red Deer Official Results 1967 Alberta general election". Alberta Heritage Community Foundation.

=== 1971 ===
1971 Alberta general election
| Party | Candidate | Votes | % | ±% |
|---|---|---|---|---|
| Progressive Conservative | James L. Foster | 4,994 | 48.00% | 13.02% |
| Social Credit | Fulton Rollings | 3,627 | 34.86% | -11.75% |
| New Democratic | Ethel Taylor | 1,022 | 9.82% | -3.78% |
| Liberal | Len Patterson | 761 | 7.31% | 2.51% |
| Total | | 10,404 | – | – |
| Rejected, spoiled and declined | | 21 | – | – |
| Eligible electors / turnout | | 14,688 | 70.98% | 3.47% |
| Progressive Conservative gain from Social Credit | | Swing | | 0.76% |
Source(s) Source: "Red Deer Official Results 1971 Alberta general election". Alberta Heritage Community Foundation.

=== 1975 ===
1975 Alberta general election
| Party | Candidate | Votes | % | ±% |
|---|---|---|---|---|
| Progressive Conservative | James L. Foster | 6,566 | 65.86% | 17.86% |
| Social Credit | Cecil Spiers | 1,538 | 15.43% | -19.44% |
| New Democratic | Ken McMillan | 1,317 | 13.21% | 3.39% |
| Liberal | Herb Fielding | 549 | 5.51% | -1.81% |
| Total | | 9,970 | – | – |
| Rejected, spoiled and declined | | 18 | – | – |
| Eligible electors / turnout | | 16,996 | 58.77% | -12.21% |
| Progressive Conservative hold | | Swing | | 18.65% |
Source(s) Source: "Red Deer Official Results 1975 Alberta general election". Alberta Heritage Community Foundation.

=== 1979 ===
1979 Alberta general election
| Party | Candidate | Votes | % | ±% |
|---|---|---|---|---|
| Progressive Conservative | Norman F. Magee | 5,727 | 43.22% | -22.64% |
| Social Credit | Bob Mills | 5,406 | 40.79% | 25.37% |
| New Democratic | Ken McMillan | 1,861 | 14.04% | 0.83% |
| Liberal | Hubert Bouten | 258 | 1.95% | -3.56% |
| Total | | 13,252 | – | – |
| Rejected, spoiled and declined | | N/A | – | – |
| Eligible electors / turnout | | 23,640 | 56.06% | -2.71% |
| Progressive Conservative hold | | Swing | | -24.00% |
Source(s) Source: "Red Deer Official Results 1979 Alberta general election". Alberta Heritage Community Foundation.

=== 1982 ===
1982 Alberta general election
| Party | Candidate | Votes | % | ±% |
|---|---|---|---|---|
| Progressive Conservative | Jim McPherson | 10,659 | 54.84% | 11.62% |
| Independent | Bob Mills | 5,396 | 27.76% | – |
| New Democratic | Kendall Dunford | 1,915 | 9.85% | -4.19% |
| Western Canada Concept | Wynne Richard Hanson | 1,468 | 7.55% | – |
| Total | | 19,438 | – | – |
| Rejected, spoiled and declined | | 49 | – | – |
| Eligible electors / turnout | | 30,560 | 63.77% | 7.71% |
| Progressive Conservative hold | | Swing | | 12.33% |
Source(s) Source: "Red Deer Official Results 1982 Alberta general election". Alberta Heritage Community Foundation.

== Plebiscite results ==
=== 1957 liquor plebiscite ===
1957 Alberta liquor plebiscite results: Grande Prairie
Question A: Do you approve additional types of outlets for the sale of beer, wine and spirituous liquor subject to a local vote?
| Ballot choice | Votes | % |
| Yes | 3,565 | 56.88% |
| No | 2,703 | 43.12% |
| Total votes | 6,268 | 100% |
| Rejected, spoiled and declined | 80 | |
14,151 eligible electors, turnout 44.86%

On October 30, 1957, a stand-alone plebiscite was held province wide in all 50 of the then current provincial electoral districts in Alberta. The government decided to consult Alberta voters to decide on liquor sales and mixed drinking after a divisive debate in the Legislature. The plebiscite was intended to deal with the growing demand for reforming antiquated liquor control laws.

The plebiscite was conducted in two parts. Question A asked in all districts, asked the voters if the sale of liquor should be expanded in Alberta, while Question B asked in a handful of districts within the corporate limits of Calgary and Edmonton asked if men and woman were allowed to drink together in establishments.

Province wide Question A of the plebiscite passed in 33 of the 50 districts while Question B passed in all five districts. Red Deer voted in favour of the proposal with a solid majority. Voter turnout in the district was slightly under the province wide average of 46%.

Official district returns were released to the public on December 31, 1957. The Social Credit government in power at the time did not considered the results binding. However the results of the vote led the government to repeal all existing liquor legislation and introduce an entirely new Liquor Act.

Municipal districts lying inside electoral districts that voted against the Plebiscite were designated Local Option Zones by the Alberta Liquor Control Board and considered effective dry zones, business owners that wanted a licence had to petition for a binding municipal plebiscite in order to be granted a licence.

== See also ==
- List of Alberta provincial electoral districts
- Canadian provincial electoral districts
