= Jim McPherson =

Canadian politician

Member of the Legislative Assembly of Alberta
- In office 1982–1986
- Preceded by: Norman Magee
- Succeeded by: District Abolished
- Constituency: Red Deer

Personal details
- Party: Progressive Conservative

James McPherson was a provincial level politician from Alberta, Canada. He served as a member of the Legislative Assembly of Alberta from 1982 to 1986 sitting with the governing Progressive Conservative caucus.

== Political career ==
McPherson ran for a seat to the Legislative Assembly of Alberta in the 1982 Alberta general election. He won the electoral district of Red Deer defeating future Member of Parliament Bob Mills by a wide margin. McPherson retired from provincial politics at dissolution of the legislature in 1986 after serving a term in office.
