= John Thomas Moore =

Canadian businessman and politician

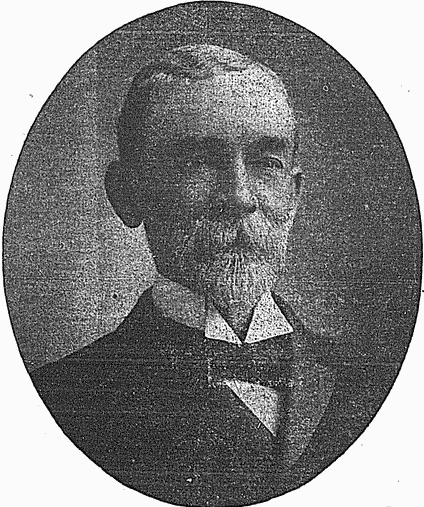

Member of the Legislative Assembly of Alberta
- In office 9 November 1905 – 21 March 1909
- Preceded by: New District
- Succeeded by: Edward Michener
- Constituency: Red Deer

Personal details
- Born: 3 July 1844 Markham Township, Canada West
- Died: 5 June 1917 (aged 72) Toronto, Ontario
- Party: Liberal

John Thomas Moore (3 July 1844 – 5 June 1917) was a Canadian businessman and politician from Alberta.

== Early life ==
John Thomas Moore was born 3 July 1844, in the Markham Township of Canada West to William Kerr and Isabella Moore. He attended school in Berlin, Ontario where his father would become a successful businessman. Moore served as the deputy registrar of Waterloo County, Ontario from 1864 to 1870, and then moved to Toronto to study medicine and law, until abandoning those pursuits and moving to insurance and accounting. He married Annie Addison on 23 August 1871, and had three children together, and married again after the death of Annie in 1911, to Alice Rogers Forbes on 3 June 1914. Moore served as an Alderman on Toronto City Council from 1883 to 1884.

During the late-19th century, Moore became a land speculator and purchased the area that has since been named in his honour, Moore Park. To increase the value of his land, he then constructed a bridge (the original Vale of Avoca) and helped promote the Belt Line Railway, an early public transit system serving the "suburbs" of Toronto. After the Belt Line was constructed, recession forced its closure after only 18 months of operation. Its railbed has since been converted into the Beltline Trail. Moore acquired land in along the Red Deer River and moved the base of his operations to Red Deer in 1901, although his family continued to live in Toronto. Moore became the publishing editor of the Red Deer Advocate and started the Western Telephone Company and Western General Electric Company in 1903.

== Political career ==
Moore was elected to the Legislative Assembly of Alberta in the 1905 Alberta general election defeating high-profile Conservative candidate and the founder of Red Deer Leonard Gaetz.

Moore was supporter of prohibition and stood in the Legislature to propose the abolition of the "bar", which he called a "drunkard factory". He was also an advocate of awarding the provincial capital to Red Deer.

Moore attempted to run for a second term in office but was defeated in the 1909 Alberta general election by Independent candidate Edward Michener.

== Later life ==
Moore return to Toronto and died there of a heart attack in 1917. Moore's will provided his new wife inherited everything with a minor legacy to his daughter, while his sons got nothing.

== See also ==
- Moore Park, Toronto

Legislative Assembly of Alberta
Preceded by New District	MLA Red Deer; 1905–1909	Succeeded by Edward Michener
