= James L. Foster =

Canadian politician

The Honourable James "Jim" L. Foster ECA KC

Member of the Legislative Assembly of Alberta
- In office August 30, 1971 – March 13, 1979
- Preceded by: William Ure
- Succeeded by: Norman Magee
- Constituency: Red Deer

Minister of Advanced Education
- In office September 10, 1971 – April 2, 1975
- Preceded by: Robert Clark
- Succeeded by: Bert Hohol

Attorney General
- In office April 3, 1975 – March 22, 1979
- Preceded by: Merv Leitch
- Succeeded by: Neil Crawford

Justice of the Court of Queen's Bench of Alberta
- In office September 13, 1991 – September 13, 2006

Personal details
- Born: 1942 or 1943 (age 83–84)
- Party: Progressive Conservative
- Education: University of Alberta (BA LLB)

James "Jim" L. Foster ECA KC is a former provincial level politician from Alberta, Canada. He served as a member of the Legislative Assembly of Alberta from 1971 to 1979 sitting with the governing Progressive Conservative caucus. During his time in office he served a couple different portfolio's as a cabinet minister in the Peter Lougheed government.

== Education ==
Foster attended the University of Alberta and was awarded a Bachelor of Arts in 1961 and a Bachelor of Laws in 1964.

== Political career ==
Foster ran for a seat to the Alberta Legislature for the first time in the 1967 Alberta general election in the electoral district of Red Deer. He finished a close second place out of four candidates but was defeated by incumbent Social Credit MLA William Ure.

Ure ran for re-election in the new Innisfail electoral district due to redistribution for the 1971 Alberta general election. Foster ran in a four-way race for the open seat and improved his popular vote slightly, while Social Credit candidate Fulton Rollings saw his party's popular vote collapse. He won his first term in the Alberta legislature defeating Rollings by just over 1,200 votes to pick up the electoral district of the Progressive Conservative party.

The win helped the Progressive Conservatives form government that year. After the election Foster was appointed by Premier Peter Lougheed to the Executive Council of Alberta to serve in his first cabinet as the first Minister of Advanced Education after he split the Education portfolio in two. Foster ran for re-election in the 1975 Alberta general election with ministerial advantage. He won his second term in office defeating three other candidates and significantly increasing his popular vote to be returned in a landslide.

After the election Lougheed shuffled his cabinet and Foster was appointed as the Attorney General for the province. He held that portfolio until he retired from office at dissolution of the assembly in 1979.

== Judicial career ==
Foster was appointed a Justice of the Court of Queen's Bench of Alberta on September 13, 1991. He served in the district of Red Deer until 2006 when he elected supernumerary status. He was replaced by his former law partner Kirk Sisson.
