= William Ure =

Canadian politician (1913–2001)

William Kenneth Ure

Member of the Legislative Assembly of Alberta
- In office 1959–1971
- Preceded by: William Kirby
- Succeeded by: James Foster
- Constituency: Red Deer

Personal details
- Born: December 22, 1913
- Died: February 4, 2001 (aged 87)
- Party: Social Credit

William Kenneth Ure (December 22, 1913 — February 4, 2001) was a provincial level politician from Alberta, Canada. He served as a member of the Legislative Assembly of Alberta from 1959 to 1971 sitting with the governing Social Credit caucus.

== Political career ==
Ure ran for as a seat to the Alberta Legislature for the first time in the Red Deer electoral district in the 1959 Alberta general election. He defeated incumbent Progressive Conservative MLA William Kirby in landslide to pick up the district for the Social Credit party.

He ran for a second term in the 1963 Alberta general election. His popular support dropped slightly, but he still easily defeated his three challengers by a wide margin to hold his seat.

Ure ran for his third term in office in the 1967 Alberta general election. He ran in a tight election against future MLA James Foster. Ure increased his popular vote slightly from the previous general election, but his margin of victory slid as Foster came a close second out of the four candidates.

The Red Deer electoral district had its boundaries changed due to redistribution in 1971. Ure ran for re-election in the new riding of Innisfail. He was defeated in a hotly contested straight fight with Progressive Conservative candidate Clifford Doan.

Ure's brother David A. Ure served as a Legislative Assembly of Alberta member for Red Deer from 1943 to 1954.
