= William Ernest Payne =

Canadian politician

Member of the Legislative Assembly of Alberta
- In office November 16, 1931 – August 22, 1935
- Preceded by: George Smith
- Succeeded by: Alfred Hooke
- Constituency: Red Deer

Personal details
- Born: October 1, 1878 Colborne, Ontario
- Died: April 21, 1943 (aged 64)
- Party: Conservative
- Occupation: lawyer and politician

William Ernest Payne (October 1, 1878 – April 21, 1943) was a lawyer and politician from Alberta, Canada. He served in the Legislative Assembly of Alberta from 1931 to 1935 as a member of the Conservative Party.

== Early life ==
Payne moved to Red Deer, Alberta in 1902 and joined the law firm started by George Wellington Greene. He worked as a lawyer at Greene and Payne in Red Deer for many years until he attempted to win a seat in the Alberta Legislature.

== Political career ==
Payne ran as a Conservative candidate in the 1926 Alberta general election in Red Deer. He ran against incumbent George Smith and former MLA John Gaetz. He was eliminated on the second vote count, losing to Smith.

Payne faced Smith again in a two-way race in the 1930 Alberta general election. He was defeated by 88 votes.

Smith died in 1931 and a by-election was held on November 16. Payne ran and defeated United Farmers candidate R.L. Gaetz by a couple hundred votes.

In the 1935 Alberta general election Payne was defeated by Social Credit candidate Alfred Hooke. He finished a distant fourth out of five candidates.

== Family ==
Payne was the great-grandson of Daniel Massey and father of William Hector Payne.
