= Norman Magee =

Canadian politician

Norman Frederick Magee

Member of the Legislative Assembly of Alberta
- In office 1979–1982
- Preceded by: James Foster
- Succeeded by: Jim McPherson
- Constituency: Red Deer

Personal details
- Born: September 22, 1922 Toronto, Ontario, Canada
- Died: September 8, 1985 (aged 62)
- Party: Progressive Conservative
- Spouse: Kay Magee

Norman Frederick Magee (September 22, 1922 – September 8, 1985) was a politician from Alberta, Canada. He served in the Legislative Assembly of Alberta from 1979 to 1982 as a member of the governing Progressive Conservative caucus.

== Political career ==
Magee ran for a seat to the Alberta Legislature in the 1979 general election, in the electoral district of Red Deer. He defeated Social Credit candidate and future member of Parliament Bob Mills and two other candidates.
