= George Wilbert Smith =

Canadian politician (1955–1931)

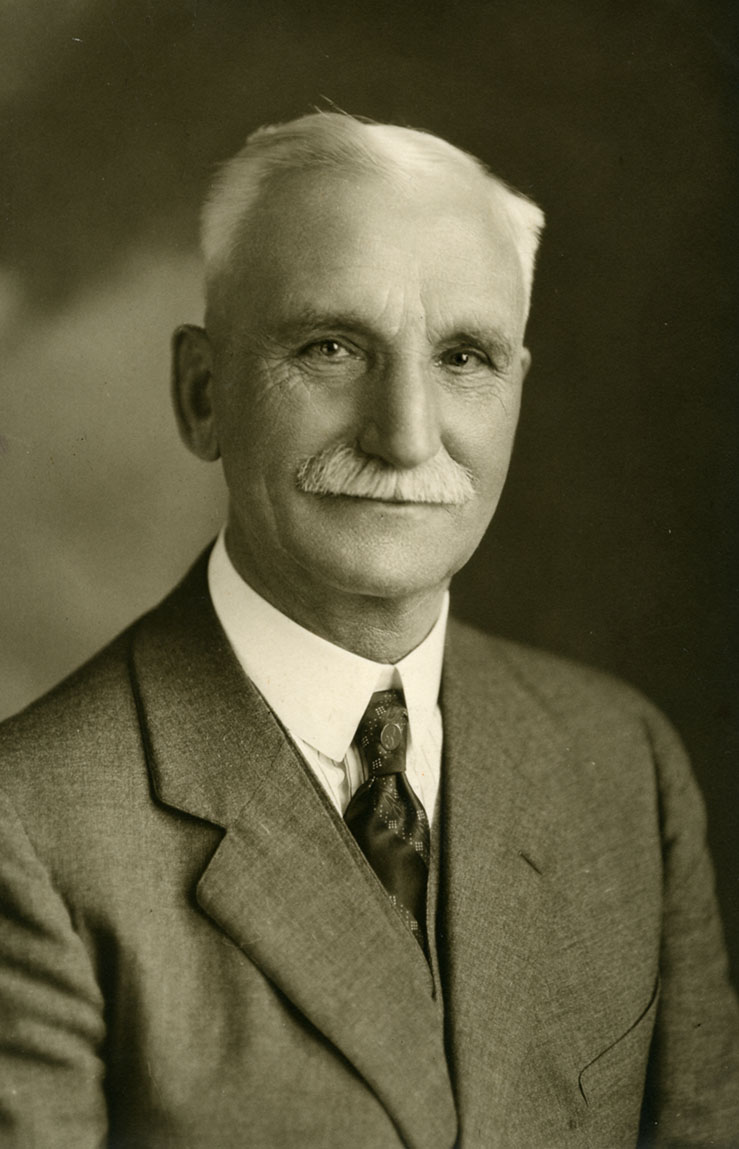

Mayor of Red Deer
- In office 1916–1918
- Preceded by: John Carswell
- Succeeded by: William Lord

Member of the Legislative Assembly of Alberta
- In office July 18, 1921 – August 1, 1931
- Preceded by: John Gaetz
- Succeeded by: William Payne
- Constituency: Red Deer

Personal details
- Born: April 24, 1855 Maitland, Nova Scotia
- Died: August 1, 1931 (aged 76) Red Deer, Alberta
- Party: United Farmers
- Occupation: teacher politician

George Wilbert Smith (April 24, 1855 – August 1, 1931) was a teacher, businessman and politician in Alberta, Canada. He served on the Red Deer City Council and in the Legislative Assembly of Alberta from 1921 until his death in 1931 sitting with the United Farmers caucus in government.

== Early life ==
George Wilbert Smith was born in 1855 in the town of Maitland, Nova Scotia. He moved to the Northwest Territories and settled in the Red Deer area in 1883. Smith became the first school teacher in central Alberta.

Smith was also a business man. He founded and served as a director on the Smith Lead Company Ltd. and also served on the board of directors for the Western General Electric Company.

== Political career ==
Smith ran for the nomination to be Liberal candidate in the 1906 Strathcona federal by-election. At the nomination meeting, Smith led in the first counts but in later rounds of voting, his vote tally was surpassed by that of Wilbert McIntyre who in the end received a majority of the vote, to take the nomination. (McIntyre went on to win the House of Commons seat in the April 5, 1906, by-election.)

=== Municipal ===
Smith served as an alderman on Red Deer City Council for several years and as mayor from 1916 to 1918.

=== Provincial ===
Smith ran for a seat to the Alberta Legislature in the 1921 Alberta general election under the United Farmers banner. He defeated incumbent John Gaetz in a two-way race in a landslide to pick up the Red Deer seat for his party.

Smith faced Gaetz again in the 1926 Alberta general election as well as Conservative candidate William Payne. The election was held using Instant-runoff voting and no candidate took a majority of the votes in the first count. On the second vote count, Gaetz was eliminated and his votes were transferred. Smith took a majority of the votes cast, to defeat Payne and hold his seat.

In the 1930 Alberta general election Smith faced Payne again in a two-way race and defeated him by 88 votes.

Smith was hospitalized in Red Deer, Alberta in July 1931 for ailing kidneys. He died on August 1, 1931, of a heart seizure shortly before he was to have surgery.
