= Alfred Speakman =

Canadian politician from Alberta (1880–1943)

Member of Parliament in the Canadian House of Commons
- In office 1921–1935
- Preceded by: Michael Clark
- Succeeded by: Eric Joseph Poole
- Constituency: Red Deer

Leader of the Official Opposition in Alberta
- In office January 29, 1942 – March 19, 1942
- Preceded by: James H. Walker
- Succeeded by: James Mahaffy

Member of the Legislative Assembly of Alberta
- In office March 21, 1940 – November 4, 1943
- Preceded by: Alfred Hooke
- Succeeded by: David Ure
- Constituency: Red Deer

Personal details
- Born: August 24, 1880 Dundee, Scotland
- Died: November 4, 1943 (aged 63) Edmonton, Alberta, Canada
- Party: United Farmers of Alberta (until 1935); Co-operative Commonwealth Federation (1935); Independent Movement (1937-1943)

Alfred Speakman (August 24, 1880 – November 4, 1943) was a politician from Alberta, Canada. He served as a United Farmers of Alberta MP from 1921 to 1935.

== Early life ==
Speakman was born August 24, 1880, in Dundee, Scotland, to James Speakman and Mary Hannah Farrar, where he attended the High School of Dundee, before his family emigrated to Canada in 1891. (After settling in Alberta, his father was an activist in the organized Farmer movement.)

Speakman married Elva Pearl Soley, with whom he had one daughter, Mary Elva.

== Federal political career ==
Speakman was elected to the House of Commons of Canada in the 1921 federal election in the district of Red Deer under the banner of the United Farmers of Alberta. He was re-elected in 1925, 1926 and 1930.

In the 1935 federal election he ran as a member of the Cooperative Commonwealth Federation and finished a distant third to Social Credit candidate Eric Joseph Poole. After this defeat, he devoted his energies to fighting Social Credit at the provincial level.

== Provincial political career ==
Speakman was instrumental in the Unity Movement, which united Alberta's opposition parties against the Social Credit government. On October 12, 1937, Speakman, as a former long-serving Member of Parliament, brought delegates from the United Farmers, Conservatives, Liberals and some disillusioned Social Crediters to a conference in Red Deer that brought the Unity coalition together.

Speakman ran as a candidate under the independent label in Red Deer in the 1940 Alberta general election and was elected after ballot transfers as was done under the instant-runoff voting system in use at the time.

Speakman served as an MLA in the Unity caucus until his death in 1943. Speakman served briefly as Leader of the Official Opposition in Alberta in 1942.

Speakman died suddenly at his home in Edmonton on November 4, 1943, after suffering from poor health.
