= Leader of the Opposition (Alberta) =

Position in the Legislative Assembly of Alberta

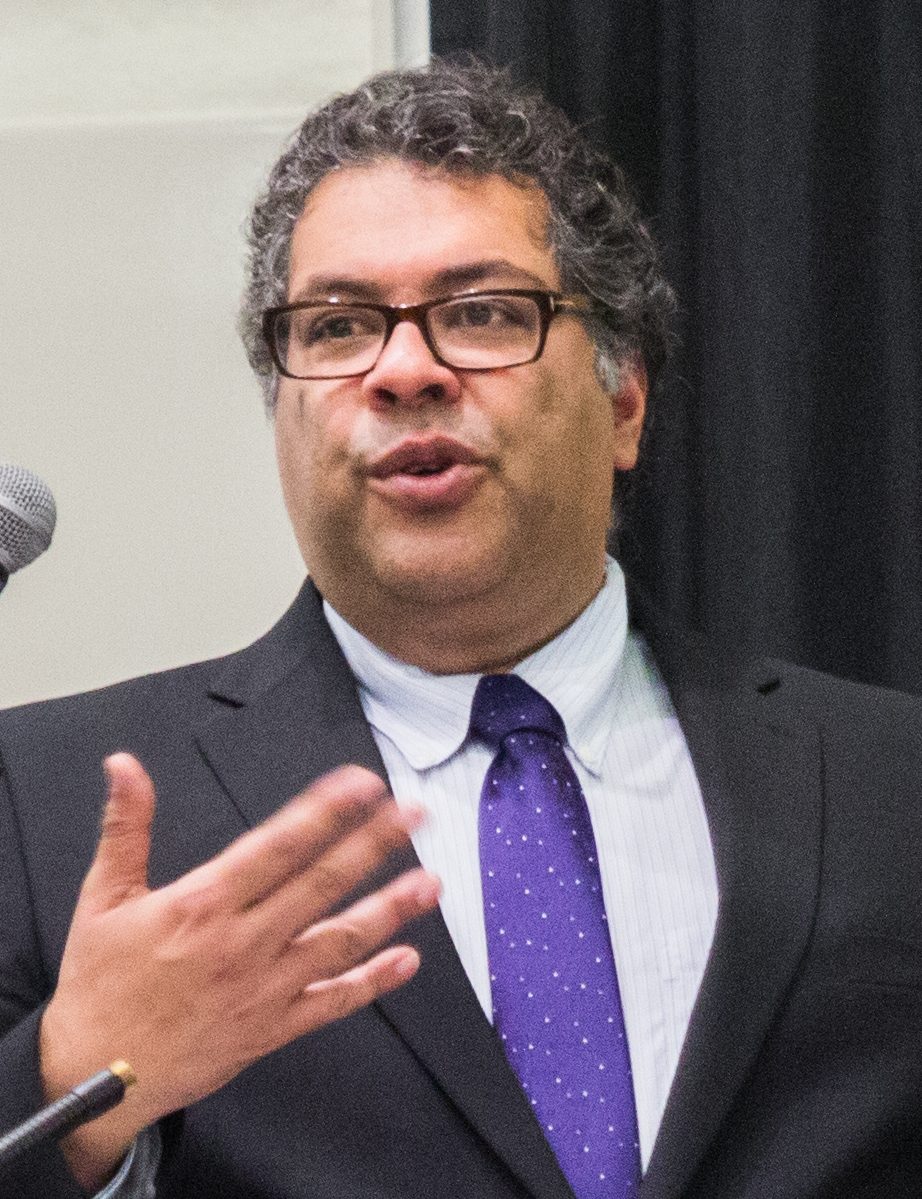
- Incumbent; Naheed Nenshi since July 12, 2025
- Official Opposition; Legislative Assembly of Alberta
- Member of: Legislative Assembly of Alberta
- Term length: While leader of the largest party not in government
- Inaugural holder: Albert Robertson
- Formation: 1906; 120 years ago

The leader of the Official Opposition, formally known as the leader of His Majesty's Loyal Opposition, is the member of the Legislative Assembly (MLA) who leads the Official Opposition, typically the second largest party in the provincial legislature.

Alberta has enjoyed long periods of stable government rule, and has elected massive government majority during almost every election in its history. In most other legislatures in Canada, the opposition party is traditionally recognized as a government in waiting, and will alternate periods of government among two or three parties. In Alberta however the opposition has traditionally been very small in terms of seat numbers, and highly unstable in terms of party leadership.

Peter Lougheed in 1971, Jason Kenney in 2019, and Danielle Smith in 2022 are the only leaders of the Opposition to become Premier of Alberta. Harry Strom in 1971 and Rachel Notley in 2019 are the only premiers to become opposition leader.

== History ==
=== The Conservative and Liberal years (1905 to 1940) ===
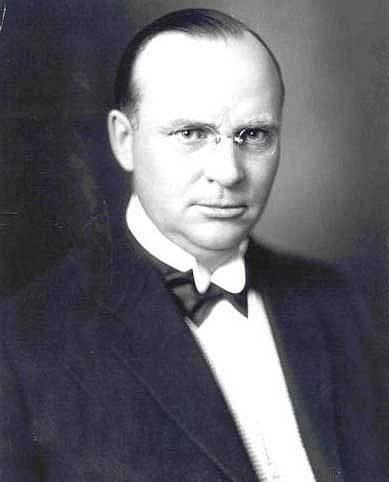
Richard Bennett Conservative Opposition leader 1909–1910

In the early years of the provincial legislature the opposition was dominated by the Conservative Party. This was a party built on remnants of the old Territorial Conservative Association. The party started out in 1905 forming opposition with only 2 seats in the legislative assembly, and proportionally grew as much as 20 seats in 1921 as Albertans grew tired of the scandals of the Liberal government.

The Conservatives looked poised to form government after a strong showing in the 1917 general election,. However both the Liberals and Conservatives were wiped out of the legislature in the 1921 general election by the United Farmers of Alberta. Albertans still distrusting of old line dominion parties opted instead for a new party that had third party status as the Non-Partisan League of Alberta and later became the United Farmers.

With the Conservatives wiped out of the legislature the Liberals formed the opposition from 1921 to 1926 confined to the cities of Calgary and Edmonton. The Liberals were helped by the fact that the United Farmers did not typically run candidates in the cities. From 1926 to 1940 there was no official opposition leader due to a Speaker's ruling that divided the Official Opposition funding between all the party leaders. However the Liberals remained the largest opposition party during this period.

A brand new party, Social Credit under William Aberhart, swept to power in the 1935 provincial election never previously having had a seat in the legislature while the United Farmers were completely wiped out.

=== The Unity Movement to the rise of Lougheed (1940 to 1971) ===
Opposition through the 1940s was dominated by the Unity Movement a coalition by Liberal and Conservatives and some former UFA supporters organized by former UFA MP Alfred Speakman to run candidates as Independents, in the 1940 Alberta general election the movement was successful at forming a large opposition that nearly equaled the popular vote of the ruling Alberta Social Credit Party. The Independents however turned out to be conflicted and hard to sustain as a united force. From 1940 to 1944 the leaders of the opposition changed with every legislative session.

The Independents were promoted through a third party group known as the Independent Citizen's Association. The last Independent opposition leader John Percy Page ran for the Citizen's Association in 1948 but was defeated, ending the Unity Movement.

The Independents' popularity started to decline in the late 1940s with newfound prosperity in Alberta and satisfaction with new Premier Ernest Manning as well as the province's business elite and newspaper editorial boards preferring to back Social Credit rather than risk the socialist Co-operative Commonwealth Federation of Alberta coming to power as they had in Saskatchewan in 1944. The Liberal Party's support grew as support for the federal Progressive Conservative Party of Canada declined. The Liberals formed the official opposition from 1951 until the 1967 general election when the Progressive Conservatives shocked the province by winning 6 seats.

In the 1959 general election, 3 opposition parties managed to each win one seat in the legislature, no opposition leader was named until after the 1963 general election.

The Progressive Conservatives led by Peter Lougheed grew to 10 members through winning 2 by-elections and 2 floor crossings. The Progressive Conservatives defeated the 35 year rule of Social Credit in the 1971 general election and held government until 2015.

=== Modern day opposition (1971 to present) ===
From 1971 to 1982 the remains of the former Social Credit government held the opposition, but they were unable to make a smooth transition and did not elect any new members in this period. Having spent virtually all of its history as the ruling party, they were unprepared for a role outside of government and sank into near-paralysis in opposition. The party collapsed in 1982, when its last two caucus members left to sit as independents. The party has not been a significant force in Alberta since.

After the 1982 general election the speaker of the Legislative Assembly had to make a controversial ruling: whether to accept the two former Social Credit members' bid to become the official opposition, or decide if it should go to the NDP, which held two seats. The speaker ruled in favour of the NDP. The new opposition status would help the party grow to 16 seats from 1986 to 1993 until they were wiped out of the legislature by popular Liberal leader Laurence Decore.

The Liberals once again became the official opposition for the first time since 1967 under Laurence Decore, who helped the Liberals soar to popularity not seen since the early 1900s. Decore however did not last long as his health started to fail, and as he was pressured by party insiders to resign since many in the caucus were disappointed that they did not win the 1993 election. The Liberal party lost popularity as the Progressive Conservatives recovered support under Ralph Klein. In the 2004 general election the Liberals gained 16 seats under Kevin Taft. The Liberals held onto official opposition until 2012, when they were replaced by the Wildrose Party under Danielle Smith in the 2012 general election. On December 17, 2014, most of the Wildrose caucus, including Smith, crossed the floor to the Progressive Conservative government, leaving the Wildrose and Liberal parties tied with 5 seats each. The Liberals petitioned the speaker to be declared the Official Opposition but on December 23, 2014, Speaker Gene Zwozdesky ruled that Wildrose would keep Official Opposition status due to incumbency.

== List of opposition leaders ==
Portrait	Name Electoral district (Birth–Death)	Term of office		Party
Portrait	Name Electoral district (Birth–Death)	Term start	Term end	Party
	Albert Robertson; MLA for High River (1864–1952)	March 15, 1906	February 25, 1909	Conservative
	R. B. Bennett; MLA for Calgary (1870–1947)	February 10, 1910	May 26, 1910	Conservative
	Edward Michener; MLA for Red Deer (1869–1947)	November 10, 1910	April 5, 1917	Conservative
	George Hoadley; MLA for Okotoks (1867–1955)	February 7, 1918	April 17, 1919	Conservative
	James Ramsey; MLA for Edmonton East (1864–1939)	February 17, 1920	April 10, 1920	Conservative
	John Robert Boyle; MLA for Edmonton (1871–1936)	February 2, 1922	April 12, 1924	Liberal
	Charles Richmond Mitchell; MLA for Bow Valley (1872–1942)	February 19, 1925	March 12, 1926	Liberal
	John C. Bowen; MLA for Edmonton (1872–1957)	March 15, 1926	June 28, 1926	Liberal
No Official Opposition leader 1926–1941
	James H. Walker; MLA for Warner (1885–1954)	February 22, 1941	April 8, 1941	Independent Movement
	Alfred Speakman; MLA for Red Deer (1880–1943)	January 29, 1942	March 19, 1942	Independent Movement
	James Mahaffy; MLA for Calgary (1905–1986)	February 18, 1943	March 30, 1943	Independent Movement
	James H. Walker; MLA for Warner (1885–1954)	February 10, 1944	March 24, 1944	Independent Movement
	John Percy Page; MLA for Edmonton (1887–1973)	February 22, 1945	August 17, 1948	Independent Citizen's Association
No Official Opposition leader 1948–1952
	James Harper Prowse; MLA for Edmonton (1913–1976)	February 21, 1952	April 15, 1958	Liberal
	Grant MacEwan; MLA for Calgary (1902–2000)	February 5, 1959	April 17, 1959	Liberal
No Official Opposition leader 1959–1964
	Michael Maccagno; MLA for Lac La Biche (1914–2000)	February 13, 1964	April 11, 1967	Liberal
	Peter Lougheed; MLA for Calgary West (1928–2012)	February 15, 1968	April 27, 1971	Progressive Conservative
	Harry Strom; MLA for Cypress (1914–1984)	December 10, 1971	November 22, 1972	Social Credit
	James Douglas Henderson; MLA for Wetaskiwin-Leduc (1927–2020)	February 15, 1973	August 21, 1973	Social Credit
	Robert Curtis Clark; MLA for Olds-Didsbury (1937–2020)	September 15, 1973	November 28, 1980	Social Credit
	Raymond Speaker; MLA for Little Bow (born 1935)	December 16, 1980	November 1, 1982	Social Credit
	Grant Notley; MLA for Spirit River-Fairview (1939–1984)	November 2, 1982	October 19, 1984	New Democratic
	Ray Martin; MLA for Edmonton-Norwood (born 1941)	November 6, 1984	June 14, 1993	New Democratic
	Laurence Decore; MLA for Edmonton-Glengarry (1940–1999)	June 15, 1993	July 15, 1994	Liberal
	Grant Mitchell; MLA for Edmonton-McClung (born 1951)	November 12, 1994	April 17, 1998	Liberal
	Howard Sapers (Note: Sapers served as Leader of the Opposition from MacBeth's election as Liberal Party leader until her election to the legislature in a by-election.); MLA for Edmonton-Glenora (born 1957) (Acting)	April 21, 1998	July 6, 1998	Liberal
	Nancy MacBeth; MLA for Edmonton-McClung (born 1948)	July 7, 1998	March 11, 2001	Liberal
	Ken Nicol; MLA for Lethbridge East (born 1944)	March 15, 2001	March 26, 2004	Liberal
	Kevin Taft; MLA for Edmonton-Riverview (born 1955)	March 27, 2004	December 14, 2008	Liberal
	David Swann; MLA for Calgary-Mountain View (born 1949)	December 15, 2008	September 10, 2011	Liberal
	Raj Sherman; MLA for Edmonton-Meadowlark (born 1965)	September 12, 2011	April 23, 2012	Liberal
	Danielle Smith; MLA for Highwood (born 1971)	April 24, 2012	December 17, 2014	Wildrose
	Heather Forsyth (Note: Forsyth served as interim Wildrose leader and Leader of the Opposition from Smith's crossing the floor to the Progressive Conservative government until Jean entered the Legislative Assembly in the 29th general election.); MLA for Calgary-Fish Creek (born 1950)	December 22, 2014	May 5, 2015	Wildrose
	Brian Jean; MLA for Fort McMurray-Conklin (born 1963)	May 5, 2015	July 24, 2017	Wildrose
	Nathan Cooper (Note: The Wildrose and Progressive Conservative parties merged to form the United Conservative Party, and Cooper was named interim leader until the party elected a new permanent one.); MLA for Olds-Didsbury-Three Hills (born 1980)	July 24, 2017	October 30, 2017	United Conservative
	Jason Nixon (Note: Nixon served as Leader of the Opposition from Kenney's election as UCP leader until his election to the Legislative Assembly in a by-election.); MLA for Rimbey-Rocky Mountain House-Sundre (born 1980)	October 30, 2017	January 29, 2018	United Conservative
	Jason Kenney; MLA for Calgary-Lougheed (born 1968)	January 29, 2018	April 30, 2019	United Conservative
	Rachel Notley; MLA for Edmonton-Strathcona (born 1964)	April 16, 2019	June 22, 2024	New Democratic
	Christina Gray (Note: Gray served as Leader of the Opposition from Nenshi's election as NDP leader until he was elected to the Legislative Assembly in a by-election.); MLA for Edmonton-Mill Woods (born 1978)	June 23, 2024	July 11, 2025	New Democratic
	Naheed Nenshi; MLA for Edmonton-Strathcona (born 1972)	July 12, 2025	present	New Democratic

== See also ==
- Leader of the Opposition
- List of Alberta provincial ministers
- List of Alberta premiers
