= Progressive Conservative Association of Alberta candidates in the 2012 Alberta provincial election =

This is a list of the candidates who ran for the Progressive Conservative Association of Alberta in the 28th Alberta provincial election. The party ran a full slate of 87, winning 61.

== Calgary area (28 seats) ==
Electoral district	Candidate name	Gender	Residence	Occupation / Notes	Votes	%	Rank
Airdrie	Kelly Hegg	male	Airdrie	school principal	5,364	32.94	2/5
Calgary-Acadia	Jonathan Denis	male	Calgary	law firm associate	6,846	45.71	1/5
Calgary-Bow	Alana DeLong	female	Calgary	computer firm management	6,997	47.16	1/5
Calgary-Buffalo	Jamie Lall	male	Calgary	member of non-profit organizations	3,505	30.66	2/5
Calgary-Cross	Yvonne Fritz	female	Calgary	registered nurse	5,492	43.77	1/5
Calgary-Currie	Christine Cusanelli	female	Calgary	school principal	7,397	44.96	1/6
Calgary-East	Moe Amery	male	Calgary		5,929	45.59	1/5
Calgary-Elbow	Alison Redford	female	Calgary	party leader	11,181	58.01	1/6
Calgary-Fish Creek	Wendelin Fraser	female	Calgary	non-profit organizations volunteer	7,626	43.51	2/4
Calgary-Foothills	Len Webber	male	Calgary	journeyman electrician	8,260	53.54	1/4
Calgary-Fort	Wayne Cao	male	Calgary	business management	4,576	41.13	1/5
Calgary-Glenmore	Linda Johnson	female	Calgary		9,721	48.02	1/4
Calgary-Greenway	Manmeet Bhullar	male	Calgary		6,509	53.80	1/4
Calgary-Hawkwood	Jason Luan	male	Calgary	community developer	9,050	46.99	1/8
Calgary-Hays	Ric McIver	male	Calgary	former city alderman	8,614	55.07	1/4
Calgary-Klein	Kyle Fawcett	male	Calgary	research consultant	6,852	41.21	1/5
Calgary-Lougheed	David Rodney	male	Calgary	educator	7,849	50.26	1/4
Calgary-Mackay-Nose Hill	Neil Brown	male	Calgary	lawyer	6,594	46.42	1/5
Calgary-McCall	Muhammad Rasheed	male	Calgary	volunteer	3,093	29.33	3/6
Calgary-Mountain View	Cecilia Low	female	Calgary	lawyer	5,293	30.77	2/5
Calgary-North West	Sandra Jansen	female	Calgary	journalist	9,164	50.82	1/6
Calgary-Northern Hills	Teresa Woo-Paw	female	Calgary	member of non-profit organizations	7,353	49.37	1/4
Calgary-Shaw	Farouk Adatia	male	Calgary	lawyer	6,864	42.13	2/5
Calgary-South East	Rick Fraser	male	Calgary	advance care paramedic	7,162	48.57	1/4
Calgary-Varsity	Donna Kennedy-Glans	female	Calgary	lawyer	8,099	45.65	1/6
Calgary-West	Ken Hughes	male	Calgary	insurance broker	8,148	49.95	1/6
Chestermere-Rocky View	Ted Morton	male		university professor	6,156	35.34	2/4
Highwood	John Barlow	male	Okotoks	newspaper publisher	8,167	42.57	2/4

== Edmonton area (26 seats) ==
Electoral district	Candidate name	Gender	Residence	Occupation / Notes	Votes	%	Rank
Edmonton-Beverly-Clareview	Tony Vandermeer	male	Edmonton	home builder	5,018	35.38	2/5
Edmonton-Calder	Bev Esslinger	female	Edmonton		5,183	34.75	2/6
Edmonton-Castle Downs	Thomas Lukaszuk	male	Edmonton	school teacher	8,057	52.61	1/5
Edmonton-Centre	Akash Khokhar	male	Edmonton	lawyer	4,289	30.87	2/4
Edmonton-Decore	Janice Sarich	female	Edmonton	business consulting	5,724	42.54	1/4
Edmonton-Ellerslie	Naresh Bhardwaj	male	Edmonton	journeyman mechanic	5,682	42.99	1/6
Edmonton-Glenora	Heather Klimchuk	female	Edmonton		6,176	38.20	1/5
Edmonton-Gold Bar	David Dorward	male	Edmonton	chartered accountant	6,689	32.97	1/6
Edmonton-Highlands-Norwood	Cris Basualdo	female	Edmonton	member of non-profit organizations	2,778	21.96	2/6
Edmonton-Manning	Peter Sandhu	male	Edmonton		5,446	39.58	1/7
Edmonton-McClung	David Xiao	male	Edmonton	business person	7,179	46.65	1/6
Edmonton-Meadowlark	Bob Maskell	male	Edmonton	school principal	5,032	34.67	2/5
Edmonton-Mill Creek	Gene Zwozdesky	male	Edmonton	teacher	6,633	55.07	1/6
Edmonton-Mill Woods	Sohail Quadri	male	Edmonton		4,943	35.23	1/6
Edmonton-Riverview	Steve Young	male	Edmonton	police officer	7,196	38.94	1/5
Edmonton-Rutherford	Fred Horne	male	Edmonton		6,945	42.19	1/6
Edmonton-South West	Matt Jeneroux	male	Edmonton	member of non-profit organizations	8,505	56.42	1/5
Edmonton-Strathcona	Emerson Mayers	male	Edmonton	registered nurse	3,093	20.38	2/5
Edmonton-Whitemud	Dave Hancock	male	Edmonton	lawyer	12,087	60.55	1/5
Fort Saskatchewan-Vegreville	Jacquie Fenske	female	Strathcona County	school teacher	8,366	49.28	1/6
Leduc-Beaumont	George Rogers	male	Leduc	realtor	8,417	51.31	1/6
Sherwood Park	Cathy Olesen	female	Sherwood Park	former municipal mayor	8,742	45.60	1/7
Spruce Grove-St. Albert	Doug Horner	male		banker	10,722	54.67	1/4
St. Albert	Stephen Khan	male	St. Albert	software management	10,481	53.76	1/5
Stony Plain	Ken Lemke	male	Stony Plain	former town mayor	7,496	45.54	1/6
Strathcona-Sherwood Park	Dave Quest	male	Sherwood Park	car sales	9,698	50.77	1/4

== Remainder of province (33 seats) ==
Electoral district	Candidate name	Gender	Residence	Occupation / Notes	Votes	%	Rank
Athabasca-Sturgeon-Redwater	Jeff Johnson	male	Athabasca	sales agent	7,377	48.40	1/4
Banff-Cochrane	Ron Casey	male	Canmore	former town mayor	6,632	41.82	1/4
Barrhead-Morinville-Westlock	Maureen Kubinec	female	Westlock County	County councillor	7,447	44.74	1/5
Battle River-Wainwright	Doug Griffiths	male	Ardrossan	school teacher	7,205	46.71	1/5
Bonnyville-Cold Lake	Genia Leskiw	female	Bonnyville	school teacher	4,815	49.10	1/4
Cardston-Taber-Warner	Pat Shimbashi	male	Barnwell	potato broker	4,208	38.35	2/4
Cypress-Medicine Hat	Leonard Mitzel	male		former county councillor	4,737	35.61	2/4
Drayton Valley-Devon	Diana McQueen	female	Drayton Valley	former town mayor	7,358	51.56	1/4
Drumheller-Stettler	Jack Hayden	male	County of Stettler No. 6	former county councillor	6,572	43.58	2/5
Dunvegan-Central Peace-Notley	Hector Goudreau	male	Falher	former town councillor	3,983	45.05	1/4
Fort McMurray-Conklin	Don Scott	male	Fort McMurray	lawyer	2,591	49.00	1/4
Fort McMurray-Wood Buffalo	Mike Allen	male	Fort McMurray	municipal councillor	3,611	49.06	1/4
Grande Prairie-Smoky	Everett McDonald	male	County of Grande Prairie No. 1	county councillor	5,474	45.93	1/5
Grande Prairie-Wapiti	Wayne Drysdale	male	Municipal District of Greenview No. 16	MD councillor	6,710	51.62	1/5
Innisfail-Sylvan Lake	Luke Ouellette	male	St. Lina	business owner	6,149	40.08	2/5
Lac La Biche-St. Paul-Two Hills	Ray Danyluk	male		farmer	5,417	42.20	2/4
Lacombe-Ponoka	Steve Christie	male	Lacombe	city mayor	5,354	35.87	2/5
Lesser Slave Lake	Pearl Calahasen	female		university professor	3,518	48.71	1/5
Lethbridge-East	Bridget Pastoor	female			6,592	40.94	1/4
Lethbridge-West	Greg Weadick	male	Lethbridge	former city councillor	5,757	36.32	1/5
Little Bow	John Kolk	male	Lethbridge County	former county councillor	4,477	35.90	2/4
Livingstone-Macleod	Evan Berger	male	Municipal District of Willow Creek No. 26	former MD councillor	7,403	41.46	2/5
Medicine Hat	Darren Hirsch	male	Medicine Hat	banker, former city alderman	5,341	38.56	2/5
Olds-Didsbury-Three Hills	Darcy Davis	male		farmer	6,633	36.99	2/4
Peace River	Frank Oberle	male		forestry advisor	4,334	55.67	1/4
Red Deer-North	Mary Anne Jablonski	female		business owner	5,091	38.95	1/5
Red Deer-South	Cal Dallas	male	Red Deer	newspaper publisher	7,044	43.74	1/5
Rimbey-Rocky Mountain House-Sundre	Ty Lund	male	Clearwater County	former MD councillor	6,145	41.49	2/4
Strathmore-Brooks	Arno Doerksen	male	Gem	farmer	5,737	39.11	2/5
Vermilion-Lloydminster	Richard Starke	male	Lloydminster	veterinarian	6,245	51.92	1/5
West Yellowhead	Robin Campbell	male	Jasper		4,405	44.86	1/5
Wetaskiwin-Camrose	Verlyn Olson	male	Armena	lawyer	7,489	52.32	1/5
Whitecourt-Ste. Anne	George VanderBurg	male	Whitecourt	former town mayor	6,373	45.93	1/4

== See also ==
- Alberta Electoral Boundary Re-distribution, 2010
