= Eric Joseph Poole =

Canadian politician

Member of the Canadian House of Commons
- In office 1935–1940
- Preceded by: Alfred Speakman
- Succeeded by: Frederick Davis Shaw
- Constituency: Red Deer

Personal details
- Born: 19 December 1907 Northwich, Cheshire, England
- Died: 1 January 1969 (aged 61) Vancouver, British Columbia
- Party: Social Credit
- Other political affiliations: Independent
- Occupation: Sapper, building contractor

Eric Joseph Poole (19 December 1907 – 1 January 1969) was a building contractor and a Canadian federal politician, serving in the House of Commons as a Social Credit MP from 1935 to 1940.

He was active in the struggles of the unemployed in Calgary in the early 1930s, especially the attack on scab workers at Mission Hill in 1933. He was sentenced to six months hard labour but due to massive united front marches, rallies and a labour picnic, the city had the convictions stayed.

== Political career ==
Poole first ran for political office in the 1935 Canadian federal election as a Social Credit candidate. He defeated incumbent Member of Parliament Alfred Speakman to pick up the Red Deer seat and win his only term in office.

Poole was one of nine federal members of parliament who attended the founding convention of the Quebec Social Credit League in Hull, Quebec on 29 January 1939. The event was attended by over 700 delegates.

In a speech in the House of Commons on 15 April 1939, Poole criticized the Liberal and Conservative parties for failing to create employment. He proposed a 50-year plan to pay off the national debt and create mass employment by hiring out-of-work Canadians to reforest all the vacant and deforested land in Canada.

In 1940, he intended to stand for a second term but was rejected by the Social Credit advisory board from standing as a New Democracy-Social Credit candidate on 27 February 1940.

After his career in federal politics Poole enlisted in the Canadian Forces joining the Army in World War II he served as a Sapper.

He ran as a candidate in the 1944 Alberta general election trying for the Army seat in the Alberta service men vote, held in January 1945. He was unsuccessful, placing fourth in the field of twenty-two candidates.
