= John Gaetz =

Canadian politician

John Jost Gaetz

Member of the Legislative Assembly of Alberta
- In office October 28, 1918 – July 18, 1921
- Preceded by: Edward Michener
- Succeeded by: George Smith
- Constituency: Red Deer

Personal details
- Born: June 6, 1859 Grand Banks of Newfoundland
- Died: December 24, 1937 (aged 78)
- Party: Liberal
- Occupation: politician

John Jost Gaetz (June 6, 1859 – December 24, 1937) was a provincial politician from Alberta, Canada. He served as a member of the Legislative Assembly of Alberta from 1918 to 1921 sitting with the Liberal caucus in government.

== Early life ==
Gaetz moved to the Red Deer area with his mother Catherine Gaetz in the fall of 1885. They applied for and got homesteads in the area. The area is now known as the Gaetz Lakes Sanctuary.

== Political career ==
Gaetz ran for a seat as the Liberal candidate in a by-election held on October 28, 1918. He won the district easily over Conservative candidate F.W. Galbraith.

Gaetz ran for a second term in the 1921 Alberta general election. He was easily defeated by United Farmers candidate George Smith in a two way race.

Gaetz attempted to win his seat back in the 1926 Alberta general election. He faced off against Smith for the second time and Conservative candidate William Payne. The race was hotly contested Gaetz finished third and was eliminated on the first count. His second preferences put Smith over the top.
