= Edward Michener =

Canadian politician

The Honourable Edward Michener
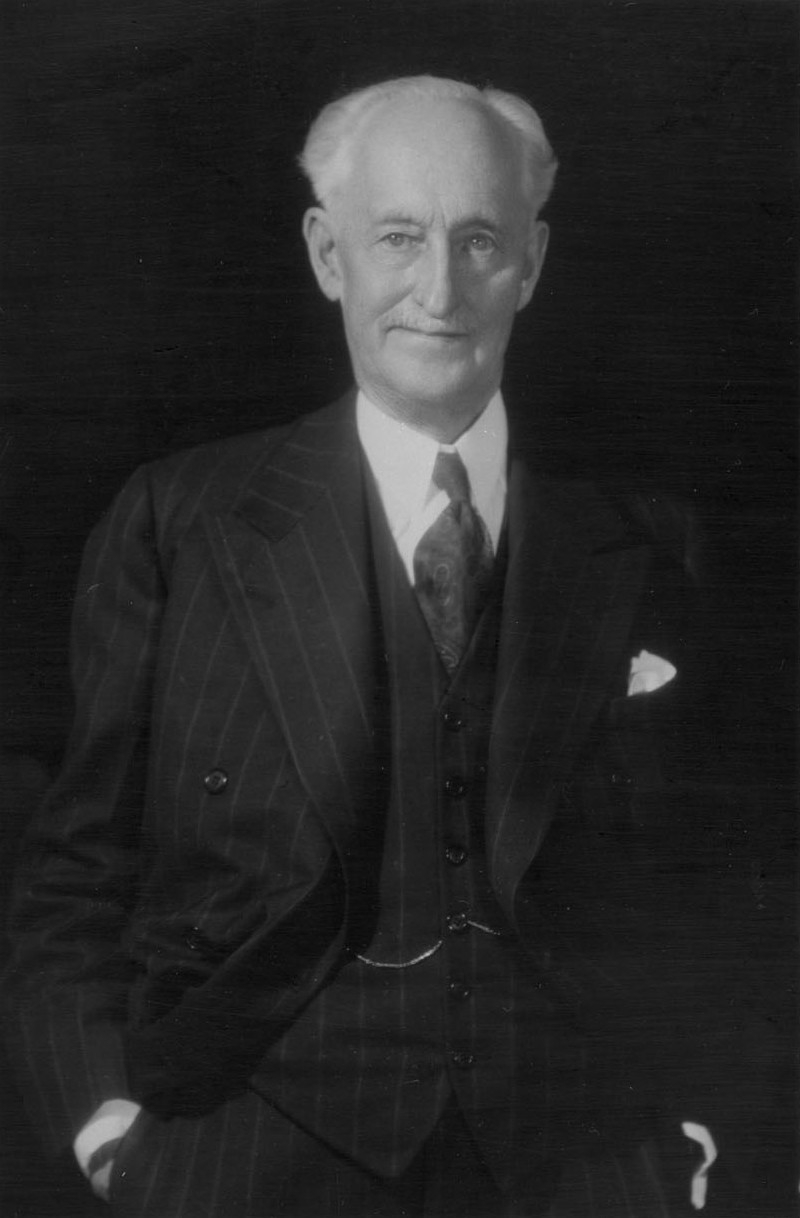

Canadian Senator from Alberta
- In office February 5, 1918 – June 16, 1947
- Appointed by: Robert Borden

Leader of the Official Opposition in Alberta
- In office November 10, 1910 – April 5, 1917
- Preceded by: R. B. Bennett
- Succeeded by: George Hoadley

Personal details
- Born: August 18, 1869 Tintern, Ontario, Canada
- Died: June 16, 1947 (aged 77) Ottawa, Ontario, Canada
- Party: Conservative (after 1918) Alberta Conservative Party 1910-1918
- Children: Roland Michener
- Occupation: politician, financial broker

Edward Michener (August 18, 1869 – June 16, 1947) was a politician from Alberta, Canada. He served as a member of the Legislative Assembly of Alberta and senator from Alberta.

== Early life ==
Edward Michener was born on August 18, 1867, to Jacob and Eliza Michener in Tintern, Ontario. He was educated at St. Catharines Collegiate Institute and post-secondary studies at Victoria University, University of Toronto and Wesley College. He was married to Mary E. Roland on September 15, 1897, and together had four sons and four daughters. Michener's son Roland Michener served as Governor General of Canada.

== Political life ==
Michener was acclaimed as mayor of Red Deer, District of Alberta, in the 1904 mayoral race. He held that position for two terms until 1906.

Michener was elected as an independent in the 1909 Alberta election. In 1910 after Richard Bennett resigned to run for the House of Commons of Canada, he crossed the floor to join the Conservatives. He became Leader of the Official Opposition in Alberta and leader of the Alberta Conservative party. He was re-elected in 1913 and 1917.

Prime Minister Robert Borden advised the appointment of Michener to the Senate of Canada in 1918. He served in that chamber until 1945.

Michener died on June 16, 1947, in Ottawa.

Legislative Assembly of Alberta
Preceded by John T. Moore	MLA Red Deer; 1909–1918	Succeeded by John Gaetz
Preceded by Richard Bennett	Leader of the Official Opposition in Alberta; 1910–1917	Succeeded by George Hoadley
