= David A. Ure =

Canadian politician

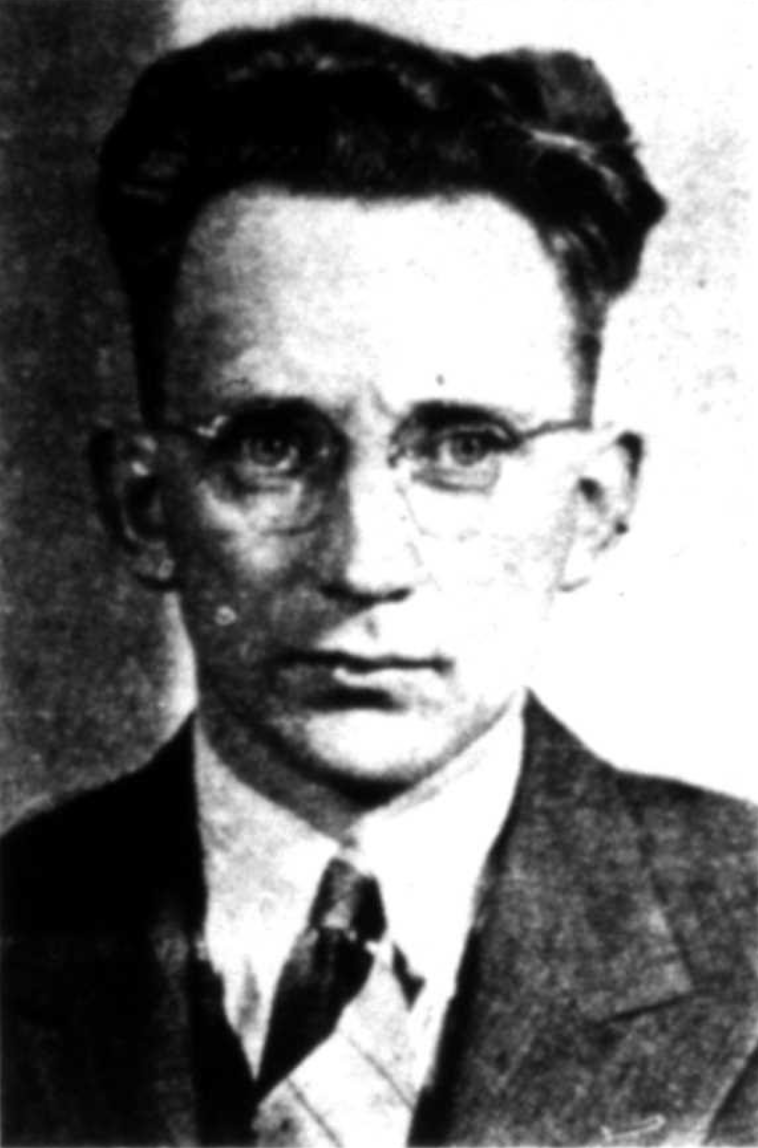

Member of the Legislative Assembly of Alberta
- In office 1944–1953
- Preceded by: Alfred Speakman
- Succeeded by: Cam Kirby
- Constituency: Red Deer

Personal details
- Born: October 9, 1910 Delburne, Alberta, Canada
- Died: December 23, 1953 (aged 43) Yellowhead Highway, near Edmonton, Alberta, Canada
- Party: Social Credit

David Alton Ure (October 9, 1910 – December 23, 1953) was a provincial politician from Alberta, Canada. He served as a member of the Legislative Assembly of Alberta from 1944 to 1953, sitting with the Social Credit caucus in government. He was killed in a head-on traffic collision with a truck in 1953.
