= Ernest Watkins =

Canadian politician

Ernest Shilston Watkins

Member of the Legislative Assembly of Alberta
- In office October 2, 1957 – June 18, 1959
- Preceded by: Arthur Ryan Smith
- Succeeded by: District abolished
- Constituency: Calgary
- In office June 18, 1959 – June 17, 1963
- Preceded by: New District
- Succeeded by: Bill Dickie
- Constituency: Calgary Glenmore

Alberta Progressive Conservative Leader
- In office 1959–1962
- Preceded by: Cam Kirby
- Succeeded by: Milt Harradence

Personal details
- Party: Progressive Conservative
- Occupation: politician

Ernest Shilston Watkins (June 18, 1902 – September 20, 1982) was a provincial politician and author from Alberta, Canada. He served as a member of the Legislative Assembly of Alberta from 1957 to 1963.

== Political career ==
Watkins was elected in a by-election held in the Calgary provincial electoral district October 2, 1957. He won nearly half the popular vote, defeating four other candidates. This was the first election held using the first past the post method of voting, after the end of Alberta's use of STV (It had used STV in Alberta's largest cities since 1924.) Under the new rules, Watkins was declared elected although he had not received a majority of the votes cast.

Watkins was re-elected in the 1959 Alberta general election for the new electoral district of Calgary Glenmore. The election results showed Watkins (with 43 percent of the vote) just ahead of the next candidate (a Social Credit) only by about 200 votes, with a Liberal candidate getting 1900 votes (16 percent) of the vote. Again, although Watkins did not have majority of the votes cast, he was declared elected.

Watkins was the only Progressive Conservative candidate elected in 1959. He became interim leader of his party replacing Cam Kirby. Watkins held the leadership until 1962 when he was replaced by Milt Harradence.

== Author ==
His books include:

The Golden Province. A Political History of Alberta

R.B. Bennett: A Biography.
