= Cam Kirby =

Canadian politician

The Honourable Cam Kirby QC
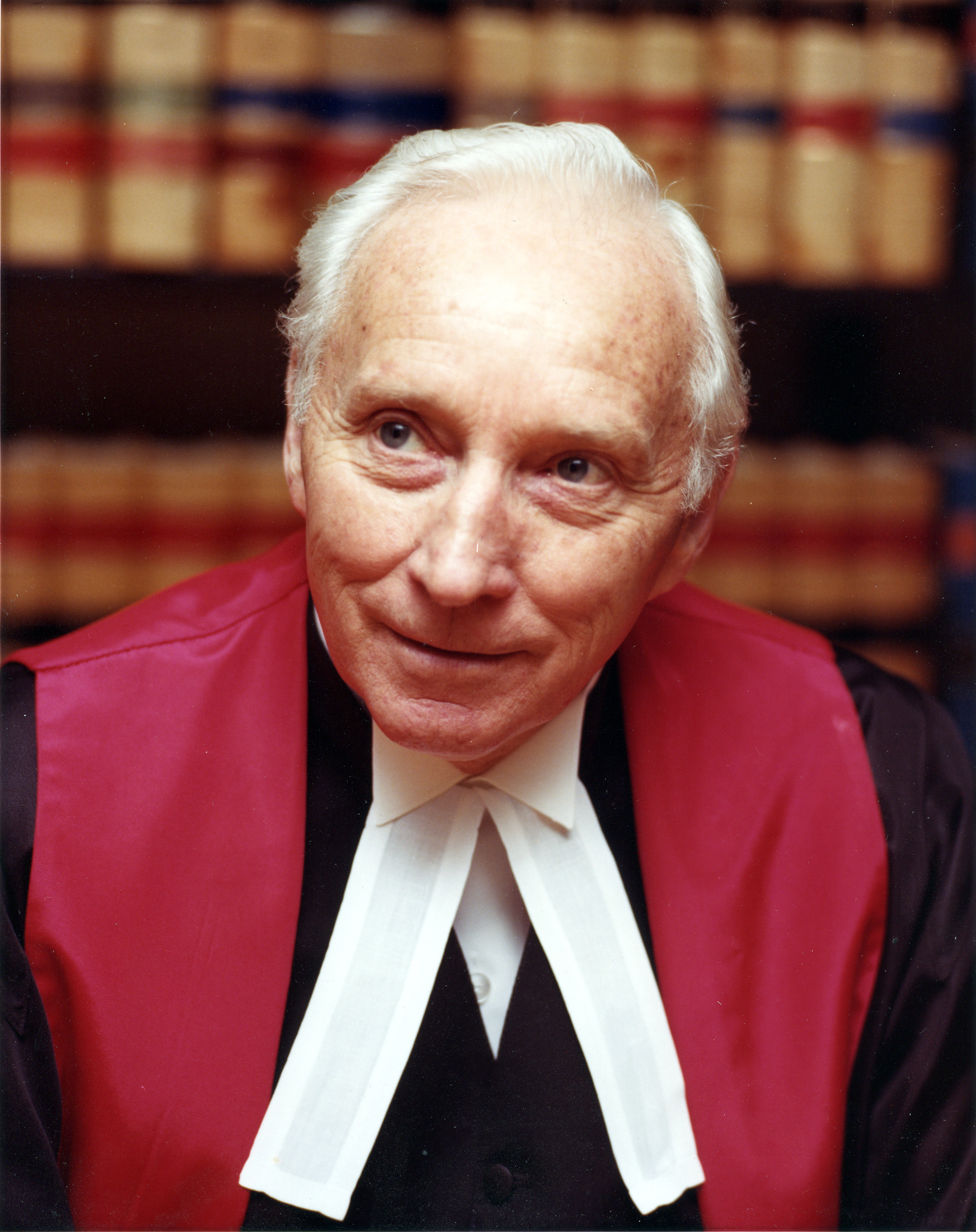

Leader of the Progressive Conservative Association of Alberta
- In office 1958–1960
- Preceded by: John Percy Page
- Succeeded by: Ernest Watkins

MLA for Red Deer
- In office 1954–1959
- Preceded by: David A. Ure
- Succeeded by: William Ure

Personal details
- Born: January 12, 1909 Calgary, Alberta
- Died: June 27, 2003 (aged 94) North Saanich, British Columbia
- Party: Progressive Conservative
- Occupation: Justice of the Court of Queen's Bench of Alberta

William John Cameron "Cam" Kirby QC (January 12, 1909 – June 27, 2003) was an Alberta politician, leader of the Conservative Party, barrister, Queen's Counsel, and a Justice of the Court of Queen's Bench.

Born in Calgary. Kirby's great grandfather Charles Kirby (1805–1870) came to Canada as a soldier in a regiment from Yorkshire, England at the time of the Rebellion of 1837 in Upper Canada and settled in Whitby. His son Joseph Kirby (1844–1937) enlisted as mercenary in the 184th Regiment of New York State Infantry of the Union Army during the American Civil War and returned to Canada in 1865 and joined the Ashberminam Company of Volunteers during the Fenian Raids of 1866. In 1882 he applied for a homestead in the N.W.T. situated near what is now the town of Fleming (Sask.). Kirby's father William John Kirby (1866–1964) moved further west in 1885, initially as a lumberjack in Albert Canyon, worked as an agent for the Dominion Express in Vancouver, British Columbia, and later in Calgary where Cameron Kirby was born in 1909. In 1911 William Kirby set up as a merchant in Lochairn, later named at his instigation Rocky Mountain House after the Hudson's Bay Fort built nearby on the North Saskatchewan River in 1799. There he opened a dry goods store and became postmaster and eventually the town's Reeve. In 1917 when Cameron Kirby was eight years old his mother died and he was sent by his father to live with relatives. Kirby graduated from high school in Hanna, Alberta and then attended the University of British Columbia graduating with a Bachelor of Arts in 1930 before attending graduate school at the University of Alberta.

He taught Latin, English and mathematics to the children of ranching families and became highschool principal at Okotoks, Alberta in 1935. After three years, he left to study law in Vancouver.

During World War II he received a King's commission with the Royal Canadian Artillery and was an instructor at the Officers Training Centre in Victoria. In 1943 he fought as a troop commander with the 24th and 25th Field Regiments and was part of the force that stormed the island of Kiska in the Aleutians in August, 1943, only to find that the Japanese had slipped away two weeks earlier. Having also been called to the bar in uniform in 1943, he concluded his military service as a legal officer at Pacific Command Headquarters.

Following the war he moved to Red Deer where he established a law partnership. In 1954, Red Deer Member of the Legislative Assembly David Ure died. Ure had held the seat for Social Credit since the party swept to power in 1935 and was Minister of Agriculture. Kirby contested the seat for the Conservatives and defeated Social Credit candidate William Ure, the deceased MLA's younger brother, by 234 votes in the by-election.

Kirby was returned to the Alberta legislature in the 1955 provincial election and became leader of the three man Conservative caucus in 1958 with hopes of mirroring the victory of John Diefenbaker's federal Progressive Conservatives who had won a crushing victory in the 1958 federal election wiping out the federal Social Credit Party in the process.

Despite having the backing of Diefenbaker and the Calgary Herald, the 1959 provincial election proved to be a fiasco for the renamed Progressive Conservative Party of Alberta. The Social Credit government of Ernest Manning was re-elected with an increased majority and, even though the size of the legislature had expanded, the Tories were reduced to a single seat despite more than doubling their share of the popular vote. Kirby lost his own seat to William Ure by almost 3,000 votes.

Kirby resigned as party leader in January 1960 and was appointed to the Supreme Court of Alberta (Trial Division), later the Court of Queen's Bench of Alberta.

In 1967, Justice Kirby was named by Premier Manning to conduct a one-man inquiry into allegations of influence peddling by Social Credit cabinet minister Alfred Hooke and former treasurer Edgar Hinman. Kirby's report, following an eight-month investigation, cleared the two men of wrongdoing, but scolded them for an "imprudent" mixing of public affairs and private business.

He retired from the bench on his 75th birthday in 1984.
