= Bob Mills (politician) =

Canadian federal politician (born 1941)

Robert Mills

Member of Parliament for Red Deer
- In office 1993–2008
- Preceded by: Doug Fee
- Succeeded by: Earl Dreeshen

Personal details
- Born: July 28, 1941 (age 85) Young, Saskatchewan, Canada
- Party: Conservative
- Spouse: Nicole Mills
- Profession: Reacher, farmer

Robert Mills (born July 28, 1941) is a Canadian former federal politician.

== Early life ==
Mills was born in Young, Saskatchewan but moved at the age of twelve to Saskatoon. He attended the University of Saskatchewan and graduated with a Bachelor's degree in Science and with an Education diploma. He then moved to Red Deer, Alberta and taught biology at Lindsay Thurber Comprehensive High School in Red Deer until 1979.

== Political career ==
In 1979 Mills ran for the Alberta Social Credit Party in the provincial election, but was defeated finishing a close second to Norman Magee. He ran for a second time in the 1982 provincial election as an Independent. He finished second in that race, losing to Jim McPherson.

Mills then established a travel company and operated it until his election to the Parliament of Canada in the 1993 federal election for Red Deer as a member of the Reform Party of Canada.

In subsequent elections Mills was re-elected as a member of the Canadian Alliance and the Conservative Party of Canada, in that order. He usually ran up some of the largest victory margins in Canadian politics, never winning less than 64 percent of the vote.

He served as the Conservative Party's environment critic in the shadow cabinet, until the Conservatives won the 2006 election. He then returned to the backbench until his retirement in 2008.

Mills announced on February 7, 2008, that he would retire at the next election.
