= Leonard Gaetz =

Canadian politician (1841–1907)

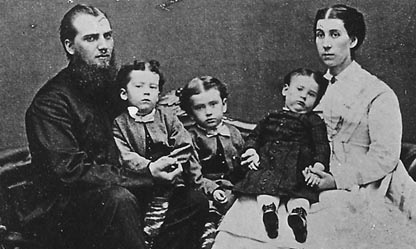
- Gaetz (far left) with his wife Caroline and three of his children
- Born: June 7, 1841; Musquodoboit, Nova Scotia
- Died: June 9, 1907 (aged 66); Red Deer, Alberta
- Occupation: Minister
- Spouse: Caroline Blowers Hamilton (m. 1865; died 1906)
- Children: 11

Leonard Gaetz (June 7, 1841 – June 9, 1907) was a Canadian politician. He was one of the first settlers and founder of what is now the city of Red Deer, Alberta.

== Early life ==
Born in 1841 at Musquodoboit, Nova Scotia, Gaetz married Caroline Blowers Hamilton in 1865. They had a family of eleven children, six sons and five daughters. Gaetz was an ordained Methodist minister, serving the church until 1883. He left the ministry due to ill health and moved to the Red Deer Valley. He decided to homestead on the west half of a section on the Red Deer River, and one of his sons, Halley Gaetz, took up the other half section.

== Red Deer ==
Leonard Gaetz acted as the local land agent for the Saskatchewan Colonization Company and purchased parts of three other sections from his employers. By 1890, the Gaetz family owned vast land holdings along the south bank of the Red Deer River around the mouth of the Waskasoo Creek. The holdings included parts of Sections 16, 17, 20 and 21. Leonard Gaetz's increasing wealth allowed his family to play a central role in the growth of Red Deer.

In 1895, Gaetz returned to the active ministry in Manitoba, at Brandon and Winnipeg. Once again, this proved detrimental to his health. He retired back to Red Deer in 1901, and resided here for the remainder of his life. He was a strong promoter of the area, founding the Westerner showgrounds and annual "Westerner Days", akin to the Calgary Stampede. A Conservative, Gaetz ran for the Legislative Assembly of Alberta unsuccessfully in the Alberta general election, 1905 and for the Legislative Assembly of the Northwest Territories in 1894, both times for the Red Deer constituency.

== Death ==
He died in Red Deer in 1907, less than a year after the death of his wife in December 1906. Two sons would serve as mayor of Red Deer, Raymond Leonard Gaetz, and Halley Hamilton Gaetz. Another son, Clarence Wilberforce Gaetz would become the first mayor of Leduc, Alberta.

== Legacy ==
A Methodist church was built in 1892 and enlarged in 1909, when the new Methodist Church was announced by the Board of Trustees, to be known as The Leonard Gaetz Memorial Methodist Church, named after Reverend Leonard Gaetz. In 1925 the local Methodist congregation voted in favour of church union, and their building became Gaetz Memorial United Church, again named in honour of Reverend Leonard Gaetz.

He is memorialized in the name of Red Deer's major thoroughfare, Gaetz Avenue, also known as 50th Avenue.
