= Progressive Conservative Association of Alberta =

Canadian provincial political party

- Founded: September 1, 1905; 121 years ago
- Dissolved: July 24, 2017; 9 years ago (de facto) February 7, 2020; 6 years ago (de jure)
- Preceded by: North-West Territories Liberal-Conservative Party (1897–1903); Territorial Conservative Association (1903–1905); Conservative Party of Alberta (1905–1959)
- Merged into: United Conservative Party
- Headquarters: Calgary, Alberta
- Ideology: Progressive conservatism; Red Toryism
- Political position: Centre-right
- Colours: Blue, orange

The Progressive Conservative Association of Alberta, often referred to as the Progressive Conservative Party of Alberta, was a provincial centre-right party in the Canadian province of Alberta that existed from 1905 to 2020. The party formed the provincial government, without interruption, from 1971 until the party's defeat in the 2015 provincial election under premiers Peter Lougheed, Don Getty, Ralph Klein, Ed Stelmach, Alison Redford, Dave Hancock and Jim Prentice. At 44 years, this was the longest unbroken run in government at the provincial or federal level in Canadian history.

In July 2017, the party membership of the PC and the Wildrose Party voted to approve a merger to become the United Conservative Party (UCP). Due to previous legal restrictions that did not formally permit parties to merge or transfer their assets, the PC Party and Wildrose Party maintained a nominal existence and ran one candidate each in the 2019 election, in which the UCP won a majority, to prevent forfeiture of their assets. The UCP government, under Premier Jason Kenney, later passed legislation allowing parties to merge, clearing the way for the PCs to formally dissolve on February 7, 2020.

== History ==
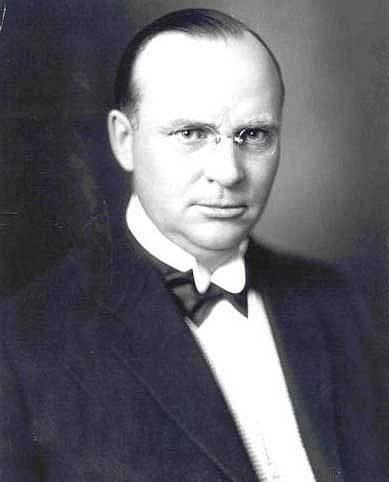
During the 1905 election, the Conservatives were led by future Canadian Prime Minister R. B. Bennett

=== Origins and early years ===
The party was created from the Northwest Territories Liberal-Conservative Party that existed from 1897 to 1905. Unlike its predecessor party, who formed government during its entire existence, the Alberta Conservatives were a marginal party for most of the first 60 years after Alberta became a province. In the province's first election, the 1905 election, the Conservatives, led by future Canadian Prime Minister Richard Bennett, won only two seats and were barely able to improve on that in subsequent elections. The main policy difference between the Tories and the Alberta Liberal Party was over the Tories' belief that the province should control its natural resources, which the province had been denied. However, those concerns fell on deaf ears in the midst of an economic boom. Additionally, the Liberals had the advantage of incumbency; they were in office on an interim basis pending the first election.

=== On the political sidelines ===
In the 1913 election, the Tories achieved a breakthrough, winning 18 seats and 45% of the vote. Despite this result, and an even better result in the 1917 election, they were still unable to beat the Liberals. The Tories then split into 'traditional' and 'radical' camps. The party collapsed, and was unable to run a full slate of candidates in the 1921 election. Only one Conservative Member of the Legislative Assembly (MLA) was returned to the Legislative Assembly in this election, in which the new United Farmers of Alberta (UFA) defeated the Liberals, and took power.

For the next 45 years, the Tories were unable to elect more than a half dozen MLAs. The party was marginalized after the UFA was able to negotiate the province's control of its resources from Ottawa, denying the Tories their major policy plank.

In 1935, the UFA collapsed. The Social Credit Party of Alberta took power on a populist and Christian conservative platform. Social Credit attracted conservative voters for decades, particularly after the party moved away from its radical social credit economic theories, and embraced fiscal conservatism.

=== The party in the 1940s and 1950s ===
In the late 1930s, the Conservatives and Liberals formed a united front in an attempt to fight Social Credit and, as a result, no Conservative candidates ran in 1940, the 1944, or 1948. Supporters of both parties ran instead as independents.

The failure of the coalition strategy led to the reemergence of separate Liberal and Conservative parties in the early 1950s. The Tories only nominated five candidates in the 1952 election, only one of whom won election. The Conservatives were led in the general election of 1959 by William J. Cameron Kirby, Member for Red Deer from 1954 to 1959.

The Tories became Progressive Conservatives in 1959 in order to conform with the name of the federal Progressive Conservative Party of Canada. The party continued to be unable to improve their fortunes, and by 1963 was swept out of the legislature altogether.

=== The party under Peter Lougheed and Don Getty ===
In March 1965, Peter Lougheed became leader of the party, and began transforming it into a political force by combining fiscal conservatism with a modernist, urban outlook. This approach was in stark contrast to the parochialism and rural agrarianism of Social Credit. In particular, the party started gaining support in Calgary and Edmonton. Social Credit had been very popular in urban areas for decades—indeed, long-serving Premier Ernest Manning represented an Edmonton riding. However, at bottom, it was a rural-based party, and never lost this essential character. It was thus slow to adapt to the changes in Alberta as its two largest cities gained increasing influence.

In 1967, the Tories returned to the legislature, electing six MLAs. Lougheed became Leader of the Opposition.

In 1968, Manning retired after 25 years, and was replaced by Harry Strom. After having spent nearly all of its 33-year history as the governing party, Social Credit had grown tired and complacent. Albertans, particularly those associated with the booming oil industry, began to turn to the young and dynamic Lougheed Tories. They were very active for an opposition in a Westminster system, introducing 21 bills. Over the next four years, Lougheed saw his small caucus grow to 10 members as a result of two by-election wins—one of which was Manning's old Edmonton seat—and two floor-crossings.

In the 1971 election, the Progressive Conservatives campaigned on a simple theme — "Now!" — symbolizing their goal of increasing Alberta's clout in Canada. On August 30, the Tories won power for the first time in Alberta's history. They finished only four percentage points ahead of Social Credit. However, they swept Edmonton and took all but five seats in Calgary. Due to the first past the post system, this gave Lougheed a strong majority government, with 49 of the 75 seats in the legislature. He won a second mandate in resounding fashion in 1975, reducing the opposition to five MLAs (four Socreds, one New Democrat) in total; one independent MLA supported Lougheed's government. During the Lougheed years, Alberta became a virtual one-party state, much like it had been during the height of the Manning years. Indeed, the six opposition MLAs elected in 1975 were the most that Lougheed faced during his final three mandates. The Tories governed with fairly large majorities for the next four decades, though nowhere near as large as the ones Lougheed had.

In power, the Progressive Conservatives fought a long battle with the federal government over control of Alberta's natural resources (particularly oil). The oil industry provided the Alberta government with large revenue surpluses that allowed it to maintain Alberta as the only province or territory in Canada without a provincial retail sales tax. Alberta experienced a large development boom, particularly in Calgary, in the 1970s and 1980s.

Lougheed retired in 1985, and Don Getty, a former longtime cabinet minister under Lougheed, came out of retirement to succeed him. Getty was unable to match Lougheed's dominance in the provincial legislature, but he enjoyed large majorities nevertheless.

=== The party under Klein and Stelmach ===
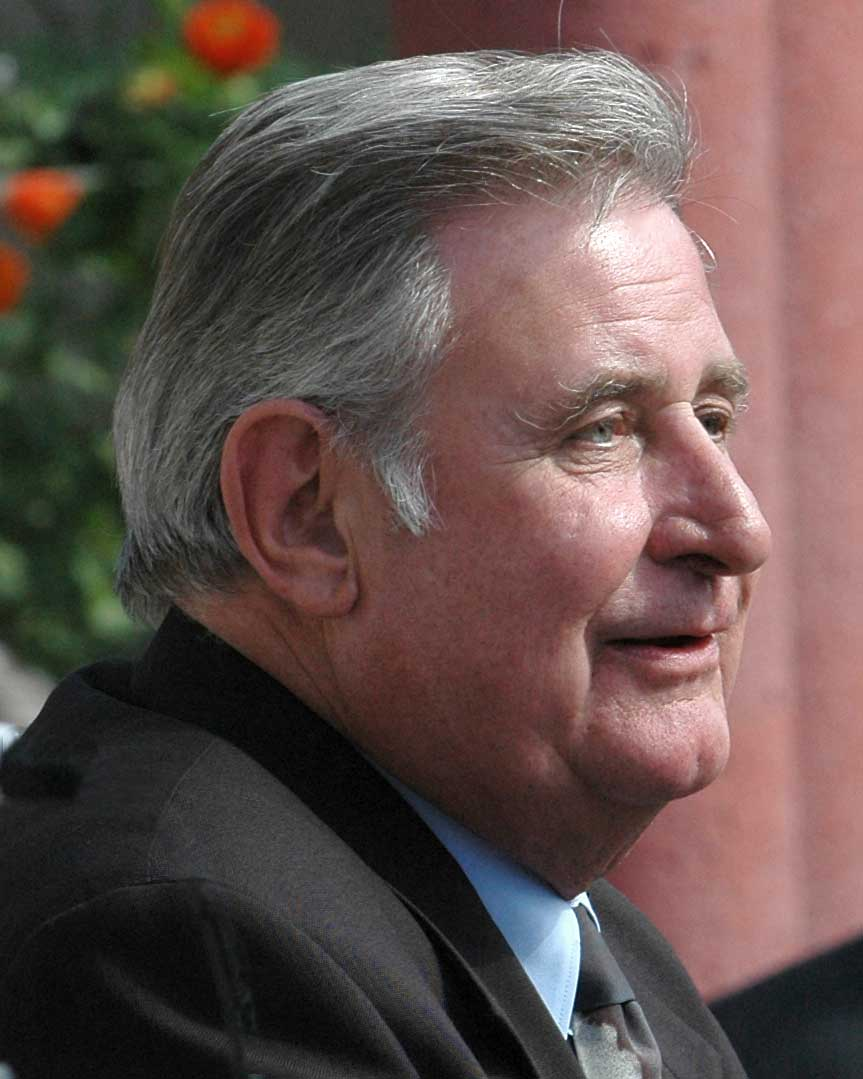
Ralph Klein: PC Leader and Premier, 1992–2006

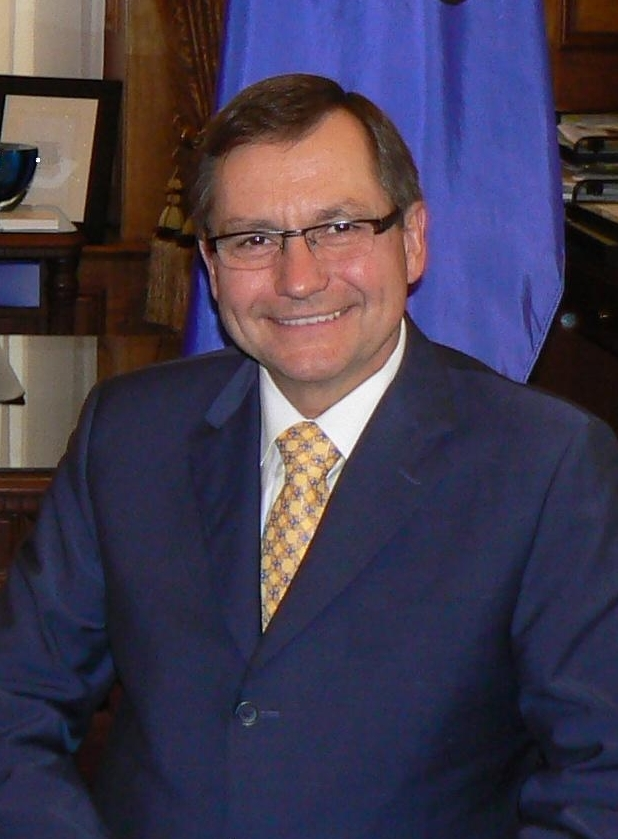
Ed Stelmach: PC Leader and Premier, 2006–2011

Logo until 2012

While the popularity of the Tories sagged somewhat under Don Getty, it was revived under Ralph Klein, who succeeded Getty as premier in 1992. Klein moved the party sharply to the right, and under his watch the Alberta Tories were one of the most (if not the most) right-wing provincial governments in Canada. In contrast, under Lougheed and Getty, the party was considered a classic example of a Red Tory government.

The party's rightward turn came at the same time that the Reform Party of Canada replaced the federal Tories as the dominant party in Alberta's federal politics. Reform and its successor, the Canadian Alliance, dominated the province's federal politics until 2003, when it merged with the federal Tories to become the Conservative Party of Canada. The Alliance's first leader, Stockwell Day, was a cabinet minister under Klein.

The party was reduced to 51 seats in the 1993 election, the closest it came to losing power during its four decades in office. However, he won a larger majority in 1997. In 2001, Klein led the PCs to their biggest majority since the Lougheed era, reducing the opposition to only nine MLAs (seven Liberals, two NDP) in total.

It was viewed as unlikely that a centrist or left-leaning opposition party (the Liberals and NDP, respectively) would be in a serious position to challenge the Conservatives for power in the 2004 general election. The Liberals, New Democrats, and a new right-wing party, the Alberta Alliance, all campaigned aggressively against the Tories in 2004. The Klein government was re-elected, but lost a dozen urban seats. Many pundits expected losses in Edmonton, the traditional heartland of the provincial Liberals; indeed, the Conservatives were cut down to three seats in Edmonton (but subsequently gained a fourth on a recount). However, the Conservatives unexpectedly lost three seats to the Liberals in Calgary, where the Tories had previously held every seat.

The Alliance did not seriously challenge the Tories' majority, but it was competitive in several rural districts that could formerly have been described as Tory bastions. For instance, the one seat taken by the Alliance, Cardston-Taber-Warner, in the southwest, had been an ultra-safe Tory seat for 30 years. This has led many pundits to conclude that although the Alliance gained less than ten percent of the popular vote in 2004, it was potentially in a position to launch a more serious challenge to the Tories in the future.

On April 4, 2006, after receiving a 55% vote of support from his party, Klein issued a press release expressing his intent to retire. A number of candidates stepped forward as possible replacements for a leadership election in late 2006. Klein officially resigned on September 20, 2006. The first round of voting on November 25 eliminated all but three candidates - Jim Dinning, Ted Morton and Ed Stelmach. None received the required 50% of the vote, so a second round was held on December 2. In the second round, Stelmach was declared the winner. He assumed the premiership on December 14. In mid-2007, the Tories passed the Socreds as the longest-serving government in Alberta history.

Stelmach went on to stun pundits and even his own supporters when he led the Tories to an increased majority in the 2008 general election, winning 72 of 83 seats. Notably, they won 13 in Edmonton, their highest total in the capital since 1982. The Tories continued to lose ground in Calgary, winning 18 seats to the Liberals' five. The Liberals were nonetheless reduced to nine seats and the NDP two, and with the Tories re-taking Cardston-Taber-Warner from the renamed Wildrose Alliance in a close race.

=== The party under Redford ===
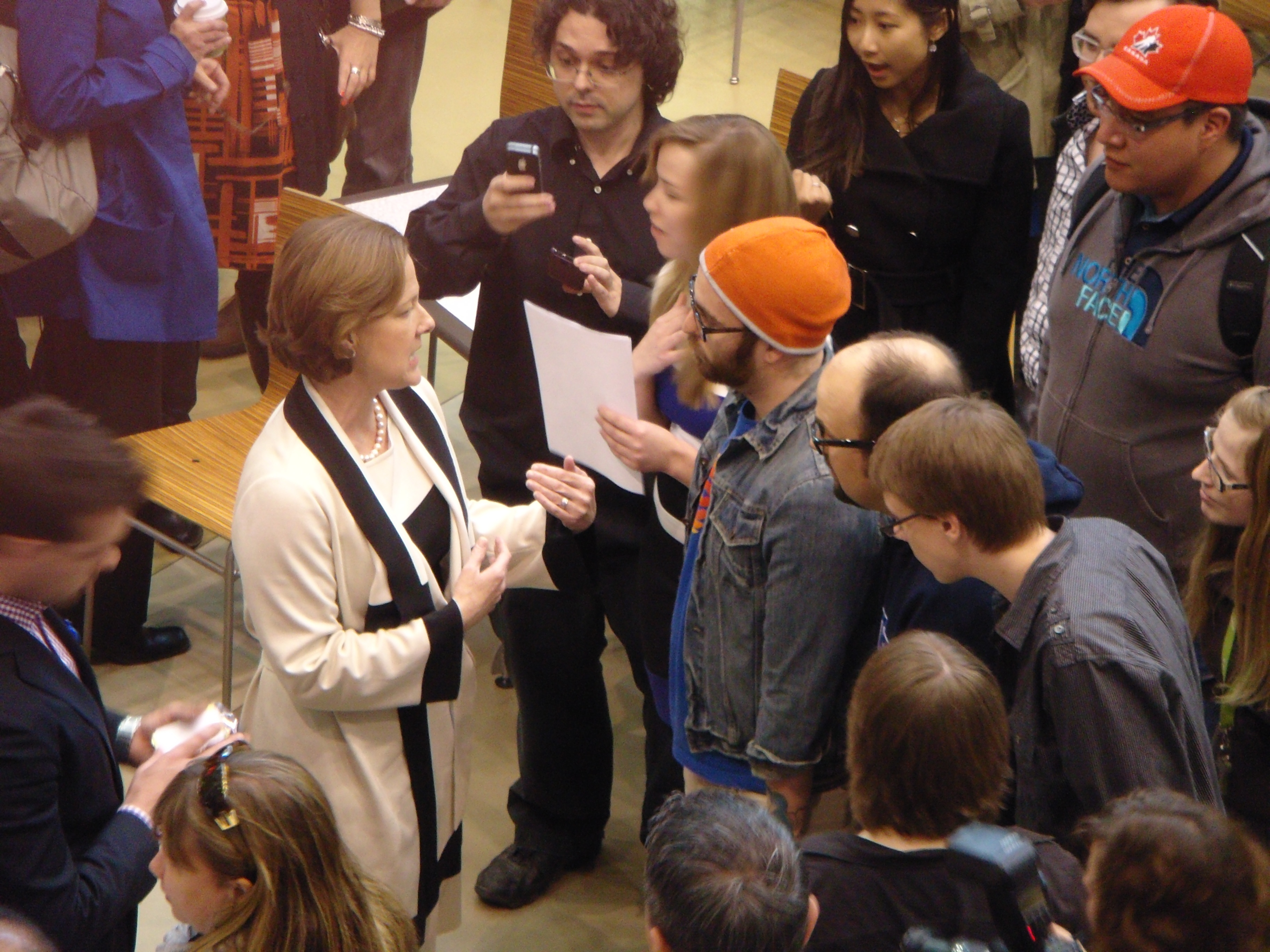
Alison Redford campaigning during the 2012 provincial election

On January 25, 2011, Stelmach announced his intention to step down as party leader and Premier prior to the next provincial election as a result of a dispute with his finance minister, Ted Morton, over the provincial budget. Stelmach formally resigned in September 2011. Justice Minister Alison Redford won the following leadership contest on October 2, 2011, and was sworn in as Premier on October 7, 2011, becoming Alberta's first female Premier.

Most polls from 2011 onward showed the PCs losing badly to the Wildrose. However, Redford defied expectations by leading the PCs to a 12th consecutive majority government in the 2012 provincial election. The PCs won 61 seats, a loss of only five. On June 18, 2013, the Alberta PCs passed their Ontario counterparts as the second-longest running provincial government in Canadian history; the Ontario PCs spent 42 consecutive years in office from 1943 to 1985.

With her approval rating at 18% and growing caucus discontent, including the defection of two MLAs, Redford announced on March 19, 2014, that she was resigning as Premier effective March 23, 2014. After her departure, it emerged that Redford had used provincial resources for personal and partisan purposes.

=== Interim leadership under Hancock and defeat under Prentice ===
"Under Premier Prentice’s strong leadership, I believe we can work together to lead Alberta with a renewed focus on the values and principles that we share."

— Danielle Smith after crossing the floor to the PCs

Deputy Premier Dave Hancock took over as interim leader and premier pending a leadership convention. On September 6, 2014, former federal Conservative cabinet minister Jim Prentice was elected leader on the first ballot with more than 76% of the vote. Two days earlier, the Alberta PCs passed the Nova Scotia Liberals as the longest-serving provincial government in Canadian history; the Nova Scotia Liberals spent 43 consecutive years in government from 1882 to 1925.

On October 27, 2014, the PCs swept four byelections, electing Prentice and three other PC candidates.

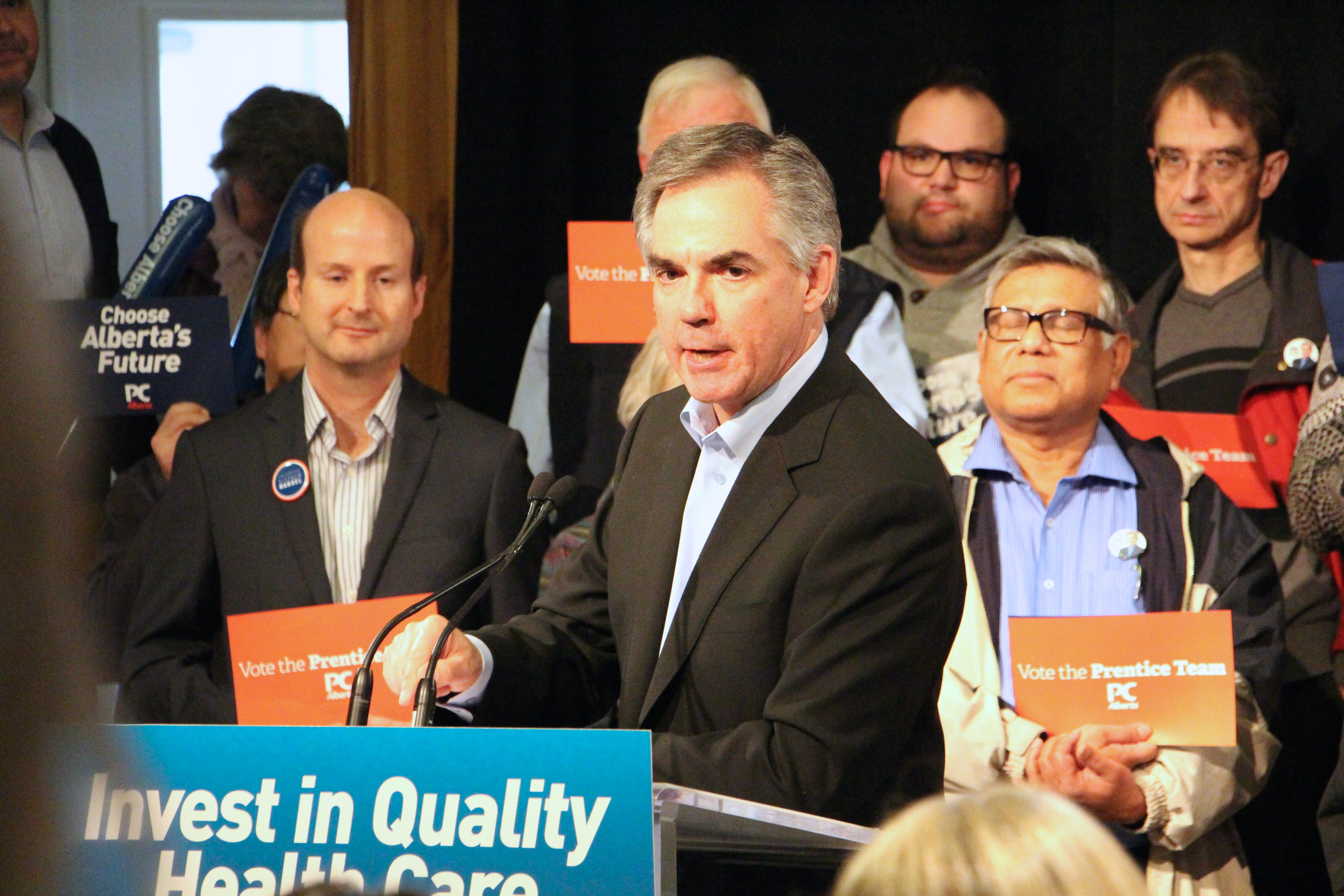
Jim Prentice at a campaign stop at the Whitemud Creek Community Centre in Edmonton during the 2015 provincial election

On November 24, 2014, Kerry Towle (Innisfail-Sylvan Lake), and Ian Donovan (Little Bow), crossed the floor to join the PC Party's caucus giving the turmoil within the Wildrose Party, uncertainty about official opposition Wildrose Party Danielle Smith's leadership and confidence in Prentice as reasons for their move. They were followed on December 17, 2014, by Smith and eight other Wildrose members — deputy leader Rob Anderson, Gary Bikman, Rod Fox, Jason Hale, Bruce McAllister, Blake Pedersen, Bruce Rowe and Jeff Wilson — also joining the Progressive Conservative caucus. Smith said that extensive talks with Prentice revealed that she and Prentice had much common ground, and therefore it made no sense for her to continue in opposition. The defections were termed "an unprecedented move in Canadian political history" and reduced the Wildrose Party to just 5 seats, tied with the Liberal Party.

Prentice's efforts were not enough to save the PCs from being heavily defeated at the May 5, 2015 provincial election. The Alberta New Democratic Party, led by Rachel Notley, rebounded from fourth place in the legislature to a strong majority government. They actually finished second in the popular vote, more than 50,000 votes ahead of the Wildrose. However, due to a near-total collapse in Edmonton (where they lost every seat) and Calgary (where they won only eight seats), they were reduced to 10 seats–all but two of which were in Calgary–and third place behind the NDP and the Wildrose. The PCs were reduced to their smallest presence in the legislature since 1967. It was one of the largest defeats suffered by a provincial government in Canada. With the result beyond doubt, Prentice immediately announced his resignation as party leader, disclaimed his election to a full term in his Calgary riding, and retired from politics.

Ric McIver was chosen interim leader by caucus on May 11, 2015.

=== The party under Kenney and merger ===
The 2017 leadership election was held on March 18, 2017, and resulted in former federal cabinet minister Jason Kenney, formerly the Conservative federal MP for Calgary Midnapore, winning on the first ballot. Kenney campaigned on a pledge to seek a merger with the Wildrose and form a unified centre-right party, similar to the Unite the Right movement that formed the federal Conservative Party.

On May 18, 2017, Kenney and Wildrose leader Brian Jean announced that their two parties had come to a merger agreement pending the outcome of votes that will be held by the membership of both parties on July 22, 2017. Pending approval by a margin of 50%+1 of Progressive Conservative members and 75% of Wildrose members, the parties were slated to begin the process of merging into the United Conservative Party, with a leadership election to occur on October 28, 2017, and a founding convention to be held in 2018. On July 22, 2017, Progressive Conservative and the Wildrose members voted, in both cases with 95% of voting members in favour, to approve the merger.

Of the 42,617 Wildrose members eligible to vote on July 22, 2017, there was a 57 per cent turnout with 23,466 voters (95%) in favour of the agreement and 1,132 (5%) against, clearing the 75% threshold required by the party's constitution. The Progressive Conservative membership also approved the agreement by a margin of 95% to 5%. With a turnout of 55% of eligible members, 25,692 PC members voted yes and 1,344 voted no with 24 spoiled ballots; the party's constitution required a simple majority of its membership to approve the merger.

With the exception of Richard Starke, the entire PC caucus joined the new UCP caucus on July 24, 2017. Starke continued as the lone PC MLA until he announced he would not be running for re-election in the 2019 provincial election.

=== Post-merger legal status and official dissolution ===
Because Alberta electoral law did not permit parties to formally merge (or even to transfer money among themselves), the PC and Wildrose parties did not formally dissolve upon creation of the new UCP. As a result, when the UCP officially came into existence on July 24, 2017; the UCP's interim leadership team formally assumed the leaderships of the PC and Wildrose parties as well. In that role, they withdrew both organizations from any meaningful public presence, thus effectively dissolving them although they continued to exist on paper. In order to give de facto effect to the merger, all PC members in good standing of as of July 24 became members of the UCP from that date, and all but a few PC members formally withdrew their memberships in the PCs. Legally, the core leadership team of the UCP remained members of both the PC and Wildrose parties. (Notwithstanding this, after he refused to join the UCP caucus, Richard Starke continued to be designated a PC member of the legislature until the 2019 election.)

To maintain their registration through the 2019 Alberta general election, both the PCs and Wildrose ran one paper candidate each in that election. Both of these nominal candidates appeared on the ballot in Edmonton-Strathcona, the riding held by incumbent Premier Notley and considered among the NDP's safest seats.

The newly elected UCP government passed legislation allowing parties to merge during the Fall 2019 legislative session. On February 7, 2020, the merger was formally approved by Elections Alberta, allowing the party to officially merge into the UCP and dissolve.

== Party leaders ==
Northwest Territories Liberal-Conservative Party

- Frederick Haultain (1897–1905)

Conservative Party of Alberta

- Richard (R.B.) Bennett (1905 election)
- Albert Robertson (1905–1909)
- Richard (R.B.) Bennett (1909–1910)
- Edward Michener (1910–1917)
- George Hoadley (1917–1920)
- James Ramsey (1920–1921)
- Alexander McGillivray (1925–1930)
- David Milwyn Duggan (1930–1942)
- John Percy Page (1952, 1955 elections)

Progressive Conservative Association of Alberta

- Cam Kirby (1959 election)
- Ernest Watkins interim (1959–1962)
- Milt Harradence (1962–1964)
- Peter Lougheed (1965–1985)
- Don Getty (1985–1992)
- Ralph Klein (1992–2006)
- Ed Stelmach (2006–2011)
- Alison Redford (2011–2014)
- Dave Hancock interim (2014)
- Jim Prentice (2014–2015)
- Ric McIver interim (2015–2017)
- Jason Kenney (2017) (Note: While Kenney legally remained leader until the party's formal dissolution in 2020, Richard Starke acted as de facto interim leader from 2017-2019, and was registered as the party's leader in the legislative assembly due to being the only Progressive Conservative MLA who did not join the United Conservatives.)

== Electoral results ==
Election	Leader	Votes	%	Seats	+/–	Position	Legislative role	Notes
1905	R. B. Bennett	9,316	37.1	3 / 25	▼6	▲2nd	Opposition	Liberal majority
1909	Albert Robertson	15,848	31.7	2 / 41	▲2	▲2nd	Opposition	Liberal majority
1913	Edward Michener	43,737	45.1	17 / 56	▲11	▲2nd	Opposition	Liberal majority
1917	Edward Michener	47,055	41.8	19 / 58	▲2	▲2nd	Opposition	Liberal majority
1921	Albert Ewing	32,734	11.0	1 / 61	▼17	▲4th	Fourth party	UFA majority
1926	Alexander McGillivray	40,091	22.1	4 / 60	▲4	▲4th	Fourth party	UFA majority
1930	David M. Duggan	27,954	14.8	6 / 63	▲2	▲3rd	Third party	UFA majority
1935	David M. Duggan	19,358	6.4	2 / 63	▼2	▲3rd	Third party	Social Credit majority
1940	None	-	-	0 / 57	Steady	Steady	No seats	Social Credit majority
1944	None	-	-	0 / 60	Steady	Steady	No seats	Social Credit majority
1948	None	-	-	0 / 57	Steady	Steady	No seats	Social Credit majority
1952	J. Percy Page	10,971	3.7	2 / 60	▲2	▲4th	Fourth party	Social Credit majority
1955	J. Percy Page	34,757	9.2	3 / 61	▲1	▲3rd	Third party	Social Credit majority
1959	Cam Kirby	98,730	23.9	1 / 65	▼2	▲2nd	Opposition	Social Credit majority
1963	Milt Harradence	51,278	12.7	0 / 63	▼1	▼3rd	No seats	Social Credit majority
1967	Peter Lougheed	129,544	26.0	6 / 65	▲6	▲2nd	Opposition	Social Credit majority
1971	Peter Lougheed	296,934	46.4	49 / 75	▲43	▲1st	Majority	
1975	Peter Lougheed	369,764	62.7	69 / 75	▲20	1st	Majority	
1979	Peter Lougheed	408,097	57.4	74 / 79	▲5	1st	Majority	
1982	Peter Lougheed	588,485	62.3	75 / 79	▲1	1st	Majority	
1986	Don Getty	366,783	51.4	61 / 83	▼14	1st	Majority	
1989	Don Getty	367,244	44.3	59 / 83	▼2	1st	Majority	
1993	Ralph Klein	439,981	44.5	51 / 83	▼8	1st	Majority	
1997	Ralph Klein	483,914	51.2	63 / 83	▲12	1st	Majority	
2001	Ralph Klein	627,252	61.9	74 / 83	▲11	1st	Majority	
2004	Ralph Klein	417,092	46.8	62 / 83	▼12	1st	Majority	
2008	Ed Stelmach	501,063	52.7	72 / 83	▲10	1st	Majority	
2012	Alison Redford	567,312	43.97	61 / 87	▼11	1st	Majority	
2015	Jim Prentice	412,955	27.80	10 / 87	▼51	▼3rd	Third party	NDP majority
Merged with Wildrose Party in 2017 to become United Conservative Party
2019 (Note: Although the party was merged into the United Conservative Party, they along with Wildrose were not fully and legally dissolved, under provincial law, until 2020 and was required to run at least one candidate to avoid having its assets revert to the province.)	Jason Kenney	297	0.02	0 / 87	▼10	▼11th	No seats	UCP majority

Alberta Senate nominee elections
Election	Votes	%	Elected
1989	127,638	20.5	0 / 1
1998	did not contest		
2004	1,276,224	58.6	3 / 4
2012	1,089,093	40.5	3 / 3

== See also ==
- List of Alberta general elections
- List of political parties in Canada
- Northwest Territories Liberal-Conservative Party
- Progressive Conservative Association of Alberta leadership elections
- Progressive Conservative Association of Alberta candidates, 2012 Alberta provincial election
- 2017 Progressive Conservative Association of Alberta leadership election

== Notes ==
Preceded by Social Credit Party of Alberta	Governing party of Alberta; 1971-2015	Succeeded by Alberta New Democratic Party
