= 16th Alberta Legislature =

Canadian Legislative Assembly

- Majority parliament
- Feb. 15, 1968 – Jul. 22, 1971

Parliament leaders
- Premier: Ernest Charles Manning; May 31, 1943 – December 12, 1968
- Harry Strom; December 12, 1968 – September 10, 1971
- Cabinets: Manning cabinet Strom cabinet
- Leader of the Opposition: Peter Lougheed; February 15, 1968 – April 27, 1971

Party caucuses
- Government: Social Credit Party
- Opposition: Progressive Conservative Association of Alberta
- Recognized: Alberta Liberal Party

Legislative Assembly
- Speaker of the Assembly: Arthur J. Dixon; March 26, 1963 – March 1, 1972
- Government House leader: Frederick C. Colborne; December 18, 1968 – February 10, 1971
- Edgar Gerhart; February 11, 1971 – April 27, 1971
- Members: 65 MLA seats

Sovereign
- Monarch: Elizabeth II; February 6, 1952 – September 8, 2022
- Lieutenant governor: Hon. Grant MacEwan; January 26, 1966 – July 2, 1974

Sessions
- 1st session February 15, 1968 – May 2, 1968
- 2nd session February 13, 1969 – May 7, 1969
- 3rd session January 29, 1970 – April 15, 1970
- 4th session February 11, 1971 – April 27, 1971
| ← 15th | → 17th |

The 16th Alberta Legislative Assembly was in session from February 15, 1968, to April 27, 1971, with the membership of the assembly determined by the results of the 1967 Alberta general election held on May 23, 1967. The Legislature officially resumed on February 15, 1968, and continued until the fourth session was prorogued on April 27, 1971, and dissolved on July 22, 1971, prior to the 1971 Alberta general election.

Alberta's sixteenth government was controlled by the majority Social Credit Party for the ninth time, led by Premier Ernest Manning, Alberta's longest serving Premier who would retire part way through the session, and be replaced by Harry Strom. The Official Opposition was led by Peter Lougheed of the Progressive Conservative Association of Alberta, who would go on to win the 1971 election and become the 9th Premier of Alberta. The Speaker was Arthur J. Dixon.

== Party standings after the 16th General Election ==
| **** | **** | **** |
| **** | **** | **** | **** | **** | **** | **** |
| **** | **** | **** | **** | **** | **** | **** | **** | **** | **** | **** | **** | **** | **** | **** |
****
****
****
| **** | **** | **** | **** | **** | **** | **** | **** | **** | **** | **** | **** | **** | **** | **** |
| **** | **** | **** | **** | **** | **** | **** | **** | **** | **** | **** | **** | **** | **** | **** |
| **** | **** | **** | **** | **** | **** | **** | **** | **** | **** | **** | **** | **** | **** | **** |

=== Standings changes in the 16th Assembly ===
| Number of members per party by date | 1967 | 1968 | | | 1969 | | | | 1971 |
| Number of members per party by date | May 23 | May 27 | Aug 20 | Dec 11 | Feb 10 | Jun 30 | Oct 28 | Nov 23 | Apr 15 |
|---|---|---|---|---|---|---|---|---|---|
| Social Credit | 55 | | 56 | 55 | | | | | |
| Progressive Conservative | 6 | | | | 7 | | 8 | 9 | 10 |
| Liberal | 3 | 2 | | | | 1 | | 0 | |
| Independent | 1 | | | | | | | | 0 |
| Total members | 65 | 64 | 65 | 64 | 65 | 64 | 65 | | |
| Vacant | 0 | 1 | 0 | 1 | 0 | 1 | 0 | | |
| Government Majority | 45 | 46 | 47 | 46 | 45 | 46 | 45 | | |

Membership changes in the 16th Assembly
| Date | Member Name | District | Party | Reason |
|---|---|---|---|---|
| May 27, 1968 | Michael Maccagno | Lac La Biche | Liberal | Resigned to run in the 1968 federal election |
| August 20, 1968 | Damase Bouvier | Lac La Biche | Social Credit | Elected in a by-election |
| December 11, 1968 | Ernest Manning | Strathcona East | Social Credit | Resigned |
| February 10, 1969 | William Yurko | Strathcona East | Progressive Conservative | Elected in a by-election |
| June 30, 1969 | William Switzer | Edson | Liberal | Died |
| October 28, 1969 | Robert Dowling | Edson | Progressive Conservative | Elected in a by-election |
| November 23, 1969 | Bill Dickie | Calgary Glenmore | Progressive Conservative | Crossed the floor from Liberals to the Progressive Conservatives |
| April 15, 1971 | Clarence Copithorne | Banff-Cochrane | Progressive Conservative | Joined the Progressive Conservative caucus |

== Members elected ==
For complete electoral history, see individual districts.

16th Alberta Legislative Assembly
| District | Member | Party | First elected/ previously elected | No.# of term(s) |
|---|---|---|---|---|
| Alexandra | Anders Aalborg | Social Credit | 1948 | 6th term |
| Athabasca | Antonio Aloisio | Social Credit | 1952, 1959 | 4th term* |
| Banff-Cochrane | Clarence Copithorne | Independent | 1967 | 1st term |
| Banff-Cochrane | Clarence Copithorne | Progressive Conservative | 1967 | 1st term |
| Bonnyville | Romeo Lamothe | Social Credit | 1961 | 3rd term |
| Bow Valley-Empress | Fred Mandeville | Social Credit | 1967 | 1st term |
| Calgary Bowness | Len Werry | Progressive Conservative | 1967 | 1st term |
| Calgary Centre | Frederick Colborne | Social Credit | 1945 | 7th term |
| Calgary East | Albert Ludwig | Social Credit | 1959 | 3rd term |
| Calgary Glenmore | Bill Dickie | Liberal | 1963 | 2nd term |
| Calgary Glenmore | Bill Dickie | Progressive Conservative | 1963 | 2nd term |
| Calgary North | Robert A. Simpson | Social Credit | 1963 | 2nd term |
| Calgary Queens Park | Lee Leavitt | Social Credit | 1952, (Note: Banff-Cochrane) 1963 | 3rd term* |
| Calgary South | Arthur Dixon | Social Credit | 1952 | 5th term |
| Calgary West | Peter Lougheed | Progressive Conservative | 1967 | 1st term |
| Calgary Victoria Park | David Russell | Progressive Conservative | 1967 | 1st term |
| Camrose | Chester Sayers | Social Credit | 1941 | 8th term |
| Cardston | Alvin Bullock | Social Credit | 1967 | 1st term |
| Clover Bar | Walt Buck | Social Credit | 1967 | 1st term |
| Cypress | Harry Strom | Social Credit | 1955 | 4th term |
| Drumheller-Gleichen | Gordon Taylor | Social Credit | 1940 | 8th term |
| Dunvegan | Ernest Lee | Social Credit | 1963 | 2nd term |
| Edmonton Centre | Ambrose Holowach | Social Credit | 1959 | 3rd term |
| Edmonton Jasper Place | John Horan | Social Credit | 1963 | 2nd term |
| Edmonton North | Ethel Wilson | Social Credit | 1959 | 3rd term |
| Edmonton North East | Lou Heard | Social Credit | 1948, 1959 | 4th term* |
| Edmonton North West | Edgar Gerhart | Social Credit | 1952 | 5th term |
| Edmonton Norwood | William Tomyn | Social Credit | 1935, (Note: Willingdon) 1959 | 7th term* |
| Edmonton West | Lou Hyndman | Progressive Conservative | 1967 | 1st term |
| Edson | William Switzer | Liberal | 1965 | 2nd term |
| Edson | Robert Dowling (1969) | Progressive Conservative | 1969 | 1st term |
| Grande Prairie | Ira McLaughlin | Social Credit | 1944 | 7th term |
| Grouard | Roy Ells | Social Credit | 1959 | 3rd term |
| Hand Hills-Acadia | Clinton French | Social Credit | 1959 | 3rd term |
| Lac La Biche | Michael Maccagno | Liberal | 1955 | 4th term |
| Lac La Biche | Damase Bouvier (1968) | Social Credit | 1968 | 1st term |
| Lac Ste. Anne | Hugh Horner | Progressive Conservative | 1967 | 1st term |
| Lacombe | Allen Patrick | Social Credit | 1952 | 5th term |
| Leduc | James Henderson | Social Credit | 1963 | 2nd term |
| Lethbridge | John Landeryou | Social Credit | 1944 | 7th term |
| Little Bow | Raymond Speaker | Social Credit | 1963 | 2nd term |
| Macleod | Leighton Buckwell | Social Credit | 1967 | 1st term |
| Medicine Hat | Harry Leinweber | Social Credit | 1961 | 3rd term |
| Okotoks-High River | Edward Benoit | Social Credit | 1963 | 2nd term |
| Olds-Didsbury | Robert Clark | Social Credit | 1960 | 3rd term |
| Peace River | Robert Wiebe | Social Credit | 1967 | 1st term |
| Pembina | Carl Muller | Social Credit | 1967 | 1st term |
| Pincher Creek-Crowsnest | Charles Drain | Social Credit | 1967 | 1st term |
| Ponoka | Neville Roper | Social Credit | 1967 | 1st term |
| Red Deer | William Ure | Social Credit | 1959 | 3rd term |
| Redwater | Michael Senych | Social Credit | 1963 | 2nd term |
| Rocky Mountain House | Alfred Hooke | Social Credit | 1935 | 9th term |
| Sedgewick-Coronation | Jack Hillman | Social Credit | 1952 | 5th term |
| Spirit River | Adolph Fimrite | Social Credit | 1952 | 5th term |
| St. Albert | Keith Everitt | Social Credit | 1959 | 3rd term |
| St. Paul | Raymond Reierson | Social Credit | 1952 | 5th term |
| Stettler | Galen Norris | Social Credit | 1956 | 4th term |
| Stony Plain | Ralph Jespersen | Social Credit | 1967 | 1st term |
| Strathcona Centre | Joseph Donovan Ross | Social Credit | 1952 | 5th term |
| Strathcona East | Ernest Manning | Social Credit | 1935 | 9th term |
| Strathcona East | William Yurko (1969) | Progressive Conservative | 1969 | 1st term |
| Strathcona South | Gerrit Radstaak | Social Credit | 1967 | 1st term |
| Strathcona West | Don Getty | Progressive Conservative | 1967 | 1st term |
| Taber-Warner | Douglas Miller | Social Credit | 1967 | 1st term |
| Three Hills | Raymond Ratzlaff | Social Credit | 1967 | 1st term |
| Vegreville-Bruce | Alex Gordey | Social Credit | 1959 | 3rd term |
| Vermilion | Ashley Cooper | Social Credit | 1959 | 3rd term |
| Wainwright | Henry Ruste | Social Credit | 1955 | 4th term |
| Wetaskiwin | Albert Strohschein | Social Credit | 1963 | 2nd term |
| Willingdon-Two Hills | Nicholas Melnyk | Social Credit | 1959 | 3rd term |
