= Manning ministry =

Cabinet of Alberta, 1943–1968

Manning Ministry
- 8th ministry of Alberta

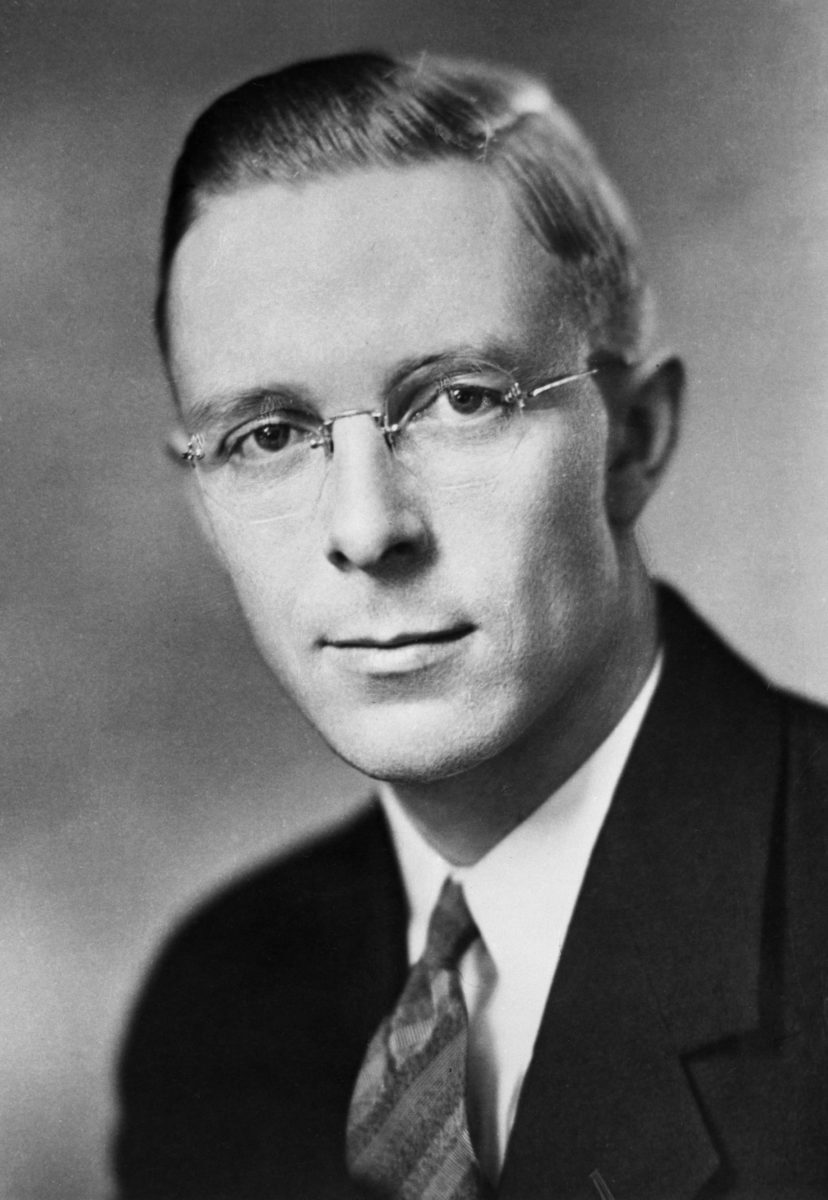
- Ernest Charles Manning in 1943.
- Date formed: May 31, 1943
- Date dissolved: December 12, 1968

People and organisations
- Monarch: George VI; Elizabeth II
- Lieutenant Governor: John C. Bowen; John J. Bowlen; John Percy Page; Grant MacEwan
- Premier: Ernest Manning
- Member party: Social Credit
- Status in legislature: Majority

History
- Legislature terms: 9th Alberta Legislature; 10th Alberta Legislature; 11th Alberta Legislature; 12th Alberta Legislature; 13th Alberta Legislature; 14th Alberta Legislature; 15th Alberta Legislature; 16th Alberta Legislature
- Predecessor: Aberhart Ministry
- Successor: Strom Ministry

The Manning Ministry was the combined Cabinet (called Executive Council of Alberta), chaired by Premier Ernest Manning, and Ministers that governed Alberta from the part way through the 9th Alberta Legislature from May 31, 1943, to mid-point of the 16th Alberta Legislature on December 12, 1968.

The Executive Council (commonly known as the cabinet) was made up of members of the Alberta Social Credit Party which held a majority of seats in the Legislative Assembly of Alberta. The cabinet was appointed by the Lieutenant Governor of Alberta on the advice of the Premier.

== List of ministers ==
Name		Date Appointed	Date Departed
Ernest Manning	President of the Executive Council (Premier)	May 31, 1943	December 12, 1968
Solon Earl Low	Provincial Treasurer	June 1, 1943	September 11, 1944
Ernest Manning	Provincial Treasurer	September 12, 1944	December 22, 1954
Clarence Gerhart	Provincial Treasurer	December 23, 1954	August 1, 1955
Ted Hinman	Provincial Treasurer	August 2, 1955	July 28, 1964
Anders Aalborg	Provincial Treasurer	July 29, 1964	September 9, 1971
Alfred Hooke	Provincial Secretary	June 1, 1943	May 7, 1948
Clarence Gerhart	Provincial Secretary	May 8, 1948	August 1, 1955
Alfred Hooke	Provincial Secretary	August 2, 1955	August 31, 1959
Allen Russell Patrick	Provincial Secretary	September 1, 1959	October 14, 1962
Ambrose Holowach	Provincial Secretary	October 15, 1962	September 9, 1971
Solon Earl Low	Minister of Education	June 1, 1943	September 11, 1944
Ronald Ansley	Minister of Education	September 12, 1944	February 21, 1948
Ivan Casey	Minister of Education	February 23, 1948	September 8, 1952
Anders Aalborg	Minister of Education	September 9, 1952	July 30, 1964
Randolph McKinnon	Minister of Education	July 31, 1964	June 28, 1967
Raymond Reierson	Minister of Education	June 29, 1967	December 11, 1968
Nathan Eldon Tanner	Minister of Mines and Minerals	April 1, 1949	September 15, 1952
Ernest Manning	Minister of Mines and Minerals	September 16, 1952	October 14, 1962
Allen Russell Patrick	Minister of Mines and Minerals	October 15, 1962	September 9, 1971
Joseph Donovan Ross	Minister of Health	April 11, 1967	May 19, 1969
Wallace Warren Cross	Minister of Public Health	June 1, 1943	September 17, 1957
Joseph Donovan Ross	Minister of Public Health	September 18, 1957	April 10, 1967
Clarence Gerhart	Minister of Municipal Affairs	June 1, 1943	December 22, 1954
Ted Hinman	Minister of Municipal Affairs	December 23, 1954	August 1, 1955
Alfred Hooke	Minister of Municipal Affairs	August 2, 1955	June 28, 1967
Edgar Gerhart	Minister of Municipal Affairs	June 29, 1967	July 15, 1968
Harry Strom	Minister of Municipal Affairs	July 16, 1968	December 11, 1968
Lucien Maynard	Attorney General	June 1, 1943	August 1, 1955
Ernest Manning	Attorney General	August 2, 1955	May 12, 1968
Edgar Gerhart	Attorney General	May 13, 1968	September 9, 1971
Duncan MacMillan	Minister of Agriculture	June 1, 1943	May 7, 1948
David A. Ure	Minister of Agriculture	May 8, 1948	December 23, 1953
Leonard Halmrast	Minister of Agriculture	January 5, 1954	October 14, 1962
Harry Strom	Minister of Agriculture	October 15, 1962	July 15, 1968
Henry Ruste	Minister of Agriculture	July 16, 1968	September 9, 1971
Alfred Hooke	Minister of Economic Affairs	April 20, 1945	August 1, 1955
Allen Russell Patrick	Minister of Economic Affairs	August 2, 1955	August 31, 1959
Gordon Taylor	Minister of Highways	May 1, 1951	September 9, 1971
John Lyle Robinson	Minister of Industries and Labour	May 8, 1948	October 29, 1953
Norman Willmore	Minister of Industries and Labour	November 10, 1953	August 1, 1955
Raymond Reierson	Minister of Industries and Labour	August 2, 1955	August 31, 1959
Allen Russell Patrick	Minister of Industry and Development	September 1, 1959	May 1, 1968
Allen Russell Patrick	Minister of Industry and Tourism	May 2, 1968	May 26, 1969
Raymond Reierson	Minister of Labour	September 1, 1959	September 9, 1971
Nathan Eldon Tanner	Minister of Lands and Forests	April 1, 1949	September 8, 1952
Ivan Casey	Minister of Lands and Forests	September 9, 1952	August 1, 1955
Norman Willmore	Minister of Lands and Forests	August 2, 1955	February 3, 1965
Henry Ruste	Minister of Lands and Forests	February 16, 1965	July 15, 1968
Alfred Hooke	Minister of Lands and Forests	July 16, 1968	December 11, 1968
Nathan Eldon Tanner	Minister of Lands and Forests	June 1, 1943	March 31, 1949
Wallace Warren Cross	Minister of Public Welfare	March 30, 1944	January 2, 1953
Leonard Halmrast	Minister of Public Welfare	January 3, 1953	January 4, 1954
Robin Jorgenson	Minister of Public Welfare	January 5, 1954	October 14, 1962
Leonard Halmrast	Minister of Public Welfare	October 15, 1962	June 28, 1967
Alfred Hooke	Minister of Public Welfare	June 29, 1967	July 15, 1968
Raymond Speaker	Minister of Public Welfare	July 16, 1968	June 30, 1969
William Fallow	Minister of Public Works	June 1, 1943	May 3, 1948
Duncan MacMillan	Minister of Public Works	May 8, 1948	September 8, 1952
Alfred Hooke	Minister of Public Works	September 9, 1952	August 1, 1955
James Hartley	Minister of Public Works	August 2, 1955	November 29, 1962
Frederick C. Colborne	Minister of Public Works	November 30, 1962	May 26, 1969
William Fallow	Minister of Railways and Telephones	June 1, 1943	May 3, 1948
Duncan MacMillan	Minister of Railways and Telephones	May 8, 1948	December 26, 1950
Gordon Taylor	Minister of Railways and Telephones	December 27, 1950	September 21, 1959
Raymond Reierson	Minister of Telephones	September 22, 1959	July 12, 1967
Anders Aalborg	Minister of Telephones	July 13, 1967	December 11, 1968
Ernest Manning	Minister of Trade and Industry	June 1, 1943	September 11, 1944
Clarence Gerhart	Minister of Trade and Industry	September 12, 1944	May 7, 1948
Robert Curtis Clark	Minister of Youth	July 4, 1966	May 18, 1970
Solon Earl Low	Minister Without Portfolio	September 12, 1944	June 30, 1945
Frederick C. Colborne	Minister Without Portfolio	August 2, 1955	November 29, 1962
Ira McLaughlin	Minister Without Portfolio	November 30, 1962	July 3, 1966
Ethel Sylvia Wilson	Minister Without Portfolio	November 30, 1962	September 9, 1971
Adolph Fimrite	Minister Without Portfolio	July 4, 1966	September 9, 1971
Raymond Speaker	Minister Without Portfolio	June 29, 1967	July 15, 1968

== See also ==
- Executive Council of Alberta
- List of Alberta provincial ministers
