= Strom ministry =

Cabinet of Alberta, 1968–1971

Strom Ministry
- 9th ministry of Alberta
- Date formed: December 12, 1968
- Date dissolved: September 10, 1971

People and organisations
- Monarch: Elizabeth II
- Lieutenant Governor: Grant MacEwan
- Premier: Harry Strom
- Member party: Social Credit
- Status in legislature: Majority

History
- Legislature term: 16th Alberta Legislature
- Predecessor: Manning Ministry
- Successor: Lougheed Ministry

The Strom Ministry was the combined Cabinet (called Executive Council of Alberta), chaired by Premier Harry Strom, and Ministers that governed Alberta from the party way through the 16th Alberta Legislature from December 12, 1968, to end of the end of the 16th Legislature and the swearing in of Premier Peter Lougheed on September 10, 1971.

The Executive Council (commonly known as the cabinet) was made up of members of the Alberta Social Credit Party which held a majority of seats in the Legislative Assembly of Alberta. The cabinet was appointed by the Lieutenant Governor of Alberta on the advice of the Premier.

== List of ministers ==
Name		Date Appointed	Date Departed
Harry Strom	President of the Executive Council (Premier)	December 12, 1968	September 10, 1971
Anders Aalborg	Provincial Treasurer	July 29, 1964	September 9, 1971
Ambrose Holowach	Provincial Secretary	October 15, 1962	September 9, 1971
Ambrose Holowach	Minister of Culture, Youth, and Recreation	April 1, 1971	September 9, 1971
Robert Curtis Clark	Minister of Education	December 12, 1968	September 9, 1971
Allen Russell Patrick	Minister of Mines and Minerals	October 15, 1962	September 9, 1971
Raymond Speaker	Minister of Health and Social Development	April 28, 1971	September 9, 1971
Joseph Donovan Ross	Minister of Health	April 11, 1967	May 19, 1969
James Douglas Henderson	Minister of Health	May 20, 1969	April 27, 1971
Edgar Gerhart	Minister of Municipal Affairs	December 12, 1968	May 26, 1969
Frederick C. Colborne	Minister of Municipal Affairs	May 27, 1969	September 9, 1971
Edgar Gerhart	Attorney General	May 13, 1968	September 9, 1971
Henry Ruste	Minister of Agriculture	July 16, 1968	September 9, 1971
Allen Russell Patrick	Minister of Industry and Tourism	May 2, 1968	May 26, 1969
Raymond Ratzlaff	Minister of Industry and Tourism	May 27, 1969	September 9, 1971
Raymond Reierson	Minister of Labour	September 1, 1959	September 9, 1971
Henry Ruste	Minister of Lands and Forests	December 12, 1968	May 19, 1969
Joseph Donovan Ross	Minister of Lands and Forests	May 20, 1969	September 9, 1971
Raymond Speaker	Minister of Public Welfare	July 16, 1968	June 30, 1969
Frederick C. Colborne	Minister of Public Works	November 30, 1962	May 26, 1969
Albert Ludwig	Minister of Public Works	May 27, 1969	September 9, 1971
Raymond Speaker	Minister of Social Development	July 1, 1969	April 27, 1971
Raymond Reierson	Minister of Telephones	December 12, 1968	September 9, 1971
James Douglas Henderson	Minister of the Environment	April 1, 1971	September 9, 1971
Robert Curtis Clark	Minister of Youth	July 4, 1966	May 18, 1970
Gordon Taylor	Minister of Youth	May 19, 1970	March 31, 1971
Ethel Sylvia Wilson	Minister Without Portfolio	November 30, 1962	September 9, 1971
Adolph Fimrite	Minister Without Portfolio	July 4, 1966	September 9, 1971

== See also ==
- Executive Council of Alberta
- List of Alberta provincial ministers
