= Lougheed ministry =

Cabinet of Alberta, 1971–1985

Lougheed Ministry
- 10th ministry of Alberta

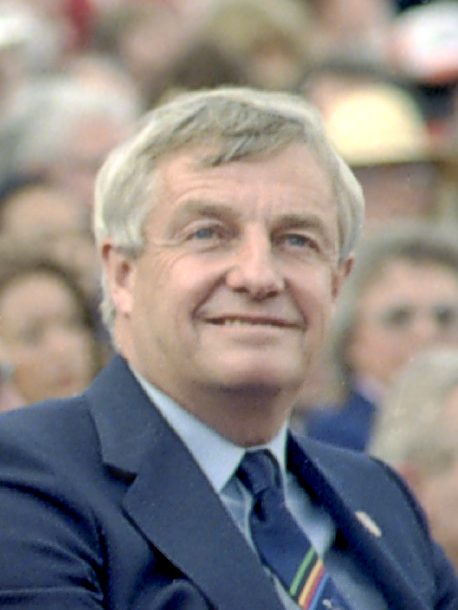
- Lougheed in 1983
- Date formed: September 10, 1971
- Date dissolved: November 1, 1985

People and organisations
- Monarch: Elizabeth II
- Lieutenant Governor: Ralph Steinhauer; Frank C. Lynch-Staunton; Helen Hunley
- Premier: Peter Lougheed
- Member party: Progressive Conservative
- Status in legislature: Majority

History
- Elections: 1971; 1975; 1979; 1982
- Legislature terms: 17th Alberta Legislature; 18th Alberta Legislature; 19th Alberta Legislature; 20th Alberta Legislature
- Predecessor: Strom Ministry
- Successor: Getty Ministry

The Lougheed Ministry was the combined Cabinet (called Executive Council of Alberta), chaired by Premier Peter Lougheed, and Ministers that governed Alberta from the 17th Alberta Legislature beginning on September 10, 1971, to mid-point of the 20th Alberta Legislature ending on November 1, 1985.

The Executive Council (commonly known as the cabinet) was made up of members of the Progressive Conservative Party of Alberta which held a majority of seats in the Legislative Assembly of Alberta. The cabinet was appointed by the Lieutenant Governor of Alberta on the advice of the Premier.

Peter Lougheed retired as Premier on November 1, 1985, ending the Lougheed Ministry, and was succeeded by Don Getty and the Getty Ministry.

== Cabinet selection ==
When selecting his Cabinets Lougheed took the approach that first-hand knowledge may be a determent to the success of the Minister, who he wanted to take on the role without any preconceived notions. For instance Hugh Horner a doctor was appointed Minister of Agriculture and Lou Hyndman a lawyer was appointed Minister of Education. Lougheed completely shuffled his Cabinet upon re-election in 1975 and 1979, with no Minister retaining the same position, although after the 1982 election he reappointed several Ministers to the same portfolios. Lougheed also oversaw an expansion of the size of Cabinet, which assisted in providing regional representation.

== List of ministers ==
Name		Date Appointed	Date Departed
Peter Lougheed	President of the Executive Council (Premier)	September 10, 1971	November 1, 1985
Hugh Horner	Deputy Premier	September 10, 1971	September 24, 1979
Gordon Miniely	Provincial Treasurer	September 10, 1971	April 2, 1975
Merv Leitch	Provincial Treasurer	April 3, 1975	March 22, 1979
Lou Hyndman	Provincial Treasurer	March 23, 1979	May 25, 1986
Merv Leitch	Attorney General	September 10, 1971	April 2, 1975
James L. Foster	Attorney General	April 3, 1975	March 22, 1979
Neil Stanley Crawford	Attorney General	March 23, 1979	May 25, 1986
James L. Foster	Minister of Advanced Education	September 10, 1971	April 2, 1975
Archibald D. Johnston	Minister of Advanced Education	November 19, 1982	May 25, 1986
Bert Hohol	Minister of Advanced Education and Manpower	April 3, 1975	March 22, 1979
Jim Horsman	Minister of Advanced Education and Manpower	March 23, 1979	November 18, 1982
Hugh Horner	Minister of Agriculture	September 10, 1971	April 2, 1975
Marvin Moore	Minister of Agriculture	April 3, 1975	March 22, 1979
Dallas Schmidt	Minister of Agriculture	March 23, 1979	November 18, 1982
LeRoy Fjordbotten	Minister of Agriculture	November 19, 1982	May 25, 1986
Robert Wagner Dowling	Minister of Business Development and Tourism	April 3, 1975	March 22, 1979
Robert Wagner Dowling	Minister of Consumer Affairs	March 6, 1973	April 2, 1975
Graham Harle	Minister of Consumer and Corporate Affairs	April 3, 1975	March 22, 1979
Julian Koziak	Minister of Consumer and Corporate Affairs	March 23, 1979	November 18, 1982
Connie Osterman	Minister of Consumer and Corporate Affairs	November 19, 1982	February 5, 1986
Horst Schmid	Minister of Culture	April 3, 1975	March 22, 1979
Horst Schmid	Minister of Culture, Youth, and Recreation	September 10, 1971	April 2, 1975
Hugh Horner	Minister of Economic Development	March 23, 1979	September 30, 1979
Hugh Planche	Minister of Economic Development	October 1, 1979	May 25, 1986
Lou Hyndman	Minister of Education	September 10, 1971	April 2, 1975
Julian Koziak	Minister of Education	April 3, 1975	March 22, 1979
David Thomas King	Minister of Education	March 23, 1979	February 5, 1986
Don Getty	Minister of Energy and Natural Resources	April 3, 1975	March 22, 1979
Merv Leitch	Minister of Energy and Natural Resources	March 23, 1979	November 18, 1982
John Zaozirny	Minister of Energy and Natural Resources	November 19, 1982	May 25, 1986
Don Getty	Minister of Federal and Intergovernmental Affairs	September 10, 1971	April 2, 1975
Lou Hyndman	Minister of Federal and Intergovernmental Affairs	April 3, 1975	March 22, 1979
Archibald D. Johnston	Minister of Federal and Intergovernmental Affairs	March 23, 1979	November 18, 1982
Jim Horsman	Minister of Federal and Intergovernmental Affairs	November 19, 1982	December 14, 1992
Horst Schmid	Minister of Government Services	April 3, 1975	March 22, 1979
Stewart McCrae	Minister of Government Services	March 23, 1979	November 18, 1982
Neil Stanley Crawford	Minister of Health and Social Development	September 10, 1971	April 2, 1975
Clarence Copithorne	Minister of Highways and Transport	September 10, 1971	April 2, 1975
Gordon Miniely	Minister of Hospitals and Medical Care	April 3, 1975	March 22, 1979
David John Russell	Minister of Hospitals and Medical Care	March 23, 1979	May 25, 1986
Larry Shaben	Minister of Housing	November 19, 1982	May 25, 1986
William Yurko	Minister of Housing and Public Works	April 3, 1975	April 23, 1978
Tom Chambers	Minister of Housing and Public Works	April 24, 1978	November 18, 1982
Fred Peacock	Minister of Industry and Commerce	June 2, 1972	April 2, 1975
Fred Peacock	Minister of Industry and Tourism	September 10, 1971	June 1, 1972
Horst Schmid	Minister of International Trade	November 19, 1982	February 5, 1986
Bert Hohol	Minister of Labour	September 10, 1971	June 1, 1972
Neil Stanley Crawford	Minister of Labour	April 3, 1975	March 22, 1979
Leslie Young	Minister of Labour	March 23, 1979	May 25, 1986
Allan Warrack	Minister of Lands and Forests	September 10, 1971	April 2, 1975
Ernie Isley	Minister of Manpower	November 19, 1982	May 25, 1986
Bert Hohol	Minister of Manpower and Labour	June 2, 1972	April 2, 1975
Bill Dickie	Minister of Mines and Minerals	September 10, 1971	April 2, 1975
David John Russell	Minister of Municipal Affairs	September 10, 1971	April 2, 1975
Archibald D. Johnston	Minister of Municipal Affairs	April 3, 1975	March 22, 1979
Marvin Moore	Minister of Municipal Affairs	March 23, 1979	November 18, 1982
Julian Koziak	Minister of Municipal Affairs	November 19, 1982	May 25, 1986
Winston Backus	Minister of Public Works	September 10, 1971	April 2, 1975
Tom Chambers	Minister of Public Works, Supply and Services	November 19, 1982	May 25, 1986
Peter Trynchy	Minister of Recreation and Parks	March 23, 1979	May 25, 1986
Al Adair	Minister of Recreation, Parks and Wildlife	April 3, 1975	March 22, 1979
Helen Hunley	Minister of Social Development and Health	April 3, 1975	April 14, 1975
Helen Hunley	Minister of Social Services and Community Health	April 15, 1975	March 22, 1979
Robert Bogle	Minister of Social Services and Community Health	March 23, 1979	November 18, 1982
Neil Webber	Minister of Social Services and Community Health	November 19, 1982	February 5, 1986
Horst Schmid	Minister of State for Economic Development - International Trade	March 23, 1979	November 18, 1982
Len Werry	Minister of Telephones	September 10, 1971	February 25, 1973
Roy Farran	Minister of Telephones and Utilities	March 6, 1973	April 2, 1975
William Yurko	Minister of the Environment	September 10, 1971	April 2, 1975
David John Russell	Minister of the Environment	April 3, 1975	March 22, 1979
Jack Cookson	Minister of the Environment	March 23, 1979	November 18, 1982
Frederick Deryl Bradley	Minister of the Environment	November 19, 1982	May 25, 1986
Al Adair	Minister of Tourism and Small Business	March 23, 1979	February 5, 1986
Hugh Horner	Minister of Transportation	April 3, 1975	March 22, 1979
Henry Kroeger	Minister of Transportation	March 23, 1979	November 18, 1982
Marvin Moore	Minister of Transportation	November 19, 1982	May 25, 1986
Robert Bogle	Minister of Utilities and Telecommunications	November 19, 1982	February 5, 1986
Allan Warrack	Minister of Utilities and Telephones	April 3, 1975	March 22, 1979
Larry Shaben	Minister of Utilities and Telephones	March 23, 1979	November 18, 1982
Helen Hunley	Solicitor General	September 11, 1973	April 2, 1975
Roy Farran	Solicitor General	April 3, 1975	March 22, 1979
Graham Harle	Solicitor General	March 23, 1979	November 15, 1983
Ian Reid	Solicitor General	January 31, 1984	May 25, 1986
Mary LeMessurier	Minister Responsible for Culture	March 23, 1979	May 25, 1986
Don McCrimmon	Minister Responsible for Native Affairs	March 23, 1979	November 18, 1982
Milt Pahl	Minister Responsible for Native Affairs	November 19, 1982	May 25, 1986
Greg Stevens	Minister Responsible for Personnel Administration	March 23, 1979	May 25, 1986
Bill Diachuk	Minister Responsible for Workers' Health, Safety and Compensation	March 23, 1979	May 25, 1986
Al Adair	Minister Without Portfolio	September 10, 1971	April 2, 1975
Robert Wagner Dowling	Minister Without Portfolio	September 10, 1971	March 5, 1973
Helen Hunley	Minister Without Portfolio	September 10, 1971	September 10, 1973
George Topolnisky	Minister Without Portfolio	September 10, 1971	April 2, 1975
Stewart McCrae	Minister Without Portfolio	April 3, 1975	March 22, 1979
Dallas Schmidt	Minister Without Portfolio	April 3, 1975	August 29, 1976
William Edward Payne	Minister Without Portfolio	November 19, 1982	May 25, 1986
Robert Bogle	Minister Without Portfolio, responsible for Native Affairs	April 3, 1975	March 22, 1977
Dallas Schmidt	Associate Minister of Energy and Natural Resources, Responsible for Public Lands	August 30, 1976	March 22, 1979
Bud Miller	Associate Minister of Public Lands and Wildlife	March 23, 1979	November 18, 1982
Donald H. Sparrow	Associate Minister of Public Lands and Wildlife	November 19, 1982	February 5, 1986
Neil Webber	Associate Minister of Telephones	March 23, 1979	November 18, 1982
Donald H. Sparrow	Associate Minister of Public Lands and Wildlife	November 19, 1982	February 5, 1986

== See also ==
- Executive Council of Alberta
- List of Alberta provincial ministers
