= 1971 Alberta general election =

- August 30, 1971

75 seats in the Legislative Assembly of Alberta 38 seats were needed for a majority
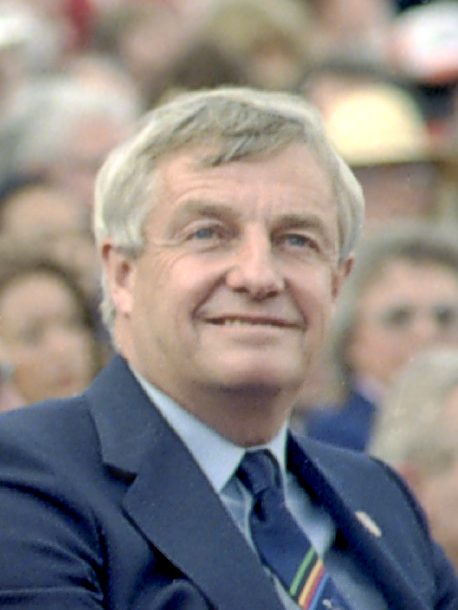

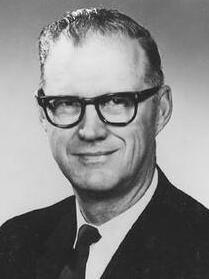

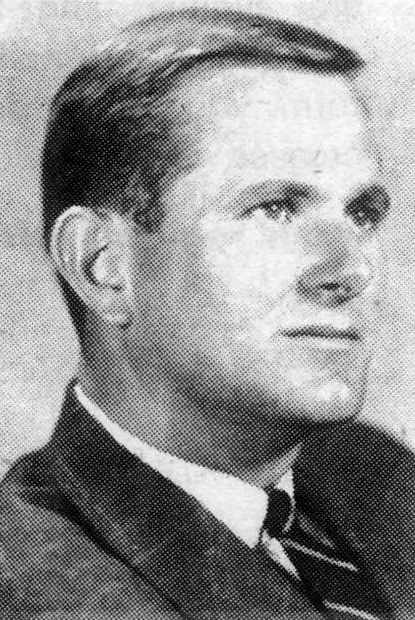
	Majority party	Minority party	Third party
Leader	Peter Lougheed	Harry Strom	Grant Notley
Party	Progressive Conservative	Social Credit	New Democratic
Leader since	1965	December 12, 1968	1968
Leader's seat	Calgary-West	Cypress	ran in Spirit River-Fairview (won)
Last election	6 seats, 26.0%	55 seats, 44.6%	0 seats, 16.0%
Seats before	10	55	0
Seats won	49	25	1
Seat change	▲39	▼30	▲1
Popular vote	296,934	262,953	73,038
Percentage	46.4%	41.1%	11.4%
Swing	▲20.4%	▼3.5%	▼4.6%
- Popular vote by riding. As this is a first-past-the-post election, seat totals are not determined by total popular vote, but instead by results in each riding.
Premier before election
Harry Strom
Social Credit
Premier after election
Peter Lougheed
Progressive Conservative

The 1971 Alberta general election was the seventeenth general election held in the Province of Alberta, Canada on August 30, 1971, to elect seventy-five members of the Alberta Legislature to form the 17th Alberta Legislative Assembly.

The Progressive Conservative Association of Alberta led by Peter Lougheed won 49 of 75 seats with 46.4 per cent of the popular vote in the new legislature to form a majority government. Lougheed's Progressive Conservatives defeated the incumbent Social Credit Party led by Premier Harry Strom who won 25 seats with 41.1 per cent of the popular vote.

The 1971 election was the first of 12 consecutive election victories for the Progressive Conservatives. They would govern for 44 years from 1971 to 2015, the longest run in government at the provincial level in Canada. The election also marked the end of Social Credit's dynasty in the province; the Socreds had governed without interruption since 1935.

== Background ==
=== 1967 Alberta general election ===
In the May 1967 election, Progressive Conservative leader Peter Lougheed and his supporters worked to convince candidates to run in all 65 constituencies; however, the Progressive Conservatives were only able to nominate 47 candidates. This was two more than the Liberal Party which had 45, but less than the full slates put forward by the Social Credit Party and the New Democratic Party.

Lougheed was subsequently elected to the legislature in Calgary-West garnering 62 per cent of the vote, and the Progressive Conservatives captured 26 per cent of the vote province-wide with five other successful candidates. With six elected MLAs, Lougheed became Leader of the Opposition. The group of elected Conservatives known as the "original six" included Calgary MLAs Len Werry and David Russell, Edmonton area MLAs Lou Hyndman and Don Getty, and the party's only rural MLA and former federal Member of Parliament Hugh Horner. The Edmonton Journal remarked positively on Lougheed's success following the 1967 election, stating Albertans had a responsible and credible alternative as opposition.

=== Lead up to 1971 ===
Ernest C. Manning had resigned as Social Credit leader and premier in 1968 after 25 years in office, a year after leading the Socreds to their ninth consecutive majority government. His successor, Harry E. Strom, had been unable to revive a government increasingly seen as tired, complacent and old-fashioned. The Socreds had been in government for almost two generations, having won their first victory more than a decade before the discovery of Leduc No. 1, which led to a massive oil boom in Alberta.

Though the legislature's mandate from the 1967 election was not due to expire until May 1972, five years after it started, convention in Canadian politics is for legislatures to be dissolved every four years or less. Accordingly, Strom resolved to call an election in 1971, sometime between May and September. He briefly considered a spring campaign, in the hopes that the planting season would have farmers feeling optimistic and therefore inclined to support the incumbent government. However, after concluding that farmers would not react well to going to the polls in the middle of planting or harvest season, Strom finally settled on August 30.

The Progressive Conservatives, on the other hand, had significant momentum going into the 1971 election. They had been very active for an opposition party in a Westminster system, introducing 21 bills. In a Westminster system, a majority government can normally run roughshod over the legislature.

Lougheed's Progressive Conservative caucus further grew from the "Original Six" with the election of Robert Dowling in the October 1969 Edson by-election, Bill Dickie, a long-time friend of Lougheed, crossing the floor from the Liberals to join his caucus in November 1969, and Banff-Cochrane independent representative Clarence Copithorne joining the party in April 1971. This growth saw the Lougheed-led Progressive Conservatives enter the August 1971 election with 10 incumbents.

== Campaign ==
=== Social Credit campaign ===
A campaign committee was assembled, and recommended a budget of $580,000. The party recruited star candidates, including Calgary alderman George Ho Lem and former Calgary Stampeder star Don Luzzi (Edmonton alderman and future mayor Cec Purves was defeated in his bid to win the Social Credit nomination in Edmonton-Strathcona from Strathcona Centre incumbent Joseph Donovan Ross), but was handicapped in these efforts by Strom's unwillingness to offer cabinet posts or other incentives to potential new candidates. Strom's lack of personal charisma was also a liability: tellingly, of the large budget recommended by the central committee, only $72,000 was recommended for use on television advertising, where Strom did not shine. The party tried to revitalize the Premier's image through publicity movies, though efforts were mixed. In one, which was pulled after a single showing, Strom appeared scowling in his living room, urging Albertans to lower their expectations of government. Another, produced by Tommy Banks and showing Strom in a variety of settings talking about the province's changing face, was more successful.

The campaign did not give Social Credit partisans much reason for optimism. Strom did not draw the crowds that Progressive Conservative opposition leader Peter Lougheed did, although an August 25 rally in Edmonton's Jubilee Auditorium featuring speeches by Strom and Manning was full. After criticizing the Conservatives' medicare platform, which promised free medicare to Albertans older than 65, as spendthrift, Strom announced Social Credit's barely cheaper alternative: medicare to Albertans older than 65 for one dollar per month. The Edmonton Journal, which had earlier published a poll showing that a plurality of Edmontonians intended to vote Progressive Conservative, endorsed Lougheed for Premier.

=== Progressive Conservative campaign ===
The Progressive Conservative Party had been preparing for an election to be called since mid-1970. The party developed slogans and branding which was one of the first instances in Alberta where political printing and branding was centrally controlled, with individual constituencies unable to develop their own materials. This centralization was intended to reinforce the party's key messages and ensure repetition in the eyes of voters. An advertising budget of $120,000 was set to provide $80,000 for television advertisements and the rest of other materials for constituencies across the province. Lougheed's focus on television contrasted Social Credit's use of radio for the less gregarious Strom. Lougheed's team was careful with messaging, stressing the idea of the Progressive Conservative providing an "alternative" rather than "opposition". Lougheed developed a 40-day schedule that brought him to each constituency to "meet and greet" with potential voters.

== Election ==
The 16th Legislature was prorogued on April 27, 1971, and dissolved three months later on July 22 with an election day set on August 30, 1971.

=== Electoral boundaries ===
A number of electoral districts were redistributed following 1970 amendments to The Elections Act, which were informed by the 1968 Report of the Alberta Committee on Redistribution Procedure written by the Special Committee on Redistribution chaired by Social Credit member Frederick C. Colborne. The number of members elected to the legislature was increased from 65 to 75,

=== Voting and eligibility ===
Amendments to the Age of Majority Act lowered the voting age from 21 to 18 years.

== Aftermath ==
The collapse of the other opposition parties made the Progressive Conservatives the only credible challenger to the Social Credit. The Progressive Conservatives took 46 per cent of the popular vote and won 49 of the 75 seats in the legislature, enough for a strong majority government. This would be the first of twelve consecutive victories for the PCs; they would remain in government without interruption until their defeat in 2015, making them the longest serving political dynasty in Canadian history. The 1971 election is considered a classic example of a realigning election.

Social Credit garnered a record number of votes in this election compared to previous elections, which had been plagued by low turn-outs. However, the Progressive Conservatives converted this slim lead into a large lead in seats due to their success in the province's two largest cities: Edmonton, where the Progressive Conservatives won every seat, and Calgary, where they took all but five.

While many of the Social Credit losses came by small margins, those losses, combined with the party being practically shut out in Calgary and Edmonton, were enough to deny Social Credit a 10th term. Due to the nature of the first past the post system, which awards power solely on the basis of seat count, Social Credit lost almost half of its caucus, taking 25 seats to the Progressive Conservative's 49. Though Social Credit's share of the vote had only slipped slightly, losing five points, Lougheed benefited from a substantial reduction in the New Democrats' vote and a near-collapse of the Liberals'. Strom conceded defeat in Edmonton and returned home to Medicine Hat. The defeat sent Social Credit into headlong decline. Its membership in the Assembly shrank over the next ten years and disappeared altogether by 1982.

The Liberal Party was shut out of the legislature. One Liberal, Bill Dickie, had crossed the floor to the PCs. Another, William Switzer, died in 1969. The remaining Liberal, Michael Maccagno, resigned to run, unsuccessfully as it turned out, for the federal Parliament.

Alberta New Democratic Party leader Grant Notley was the only one in his party to win election. He sat as the only New Democrat in the legislature until 1982. His daughter Rachel would lead the NDP to victory over the Progressive Conservatives in 2015, ending its 44 years in office.

== Results ==

Party	Party leader	# of candidates	Seats				Popular vote		
Party	Party leader	# of candidates	1967	Dissol.	Elected	+/-	#	%	% Change
Progressive Conservative	Peter Lougheed	75	6	10	49	+43	296,934	46.40%	+20.40%
Social Credit	Harry E. Strom	75	55	55	25	−30	262,953	41.10%	−3.50%
New Democrats	Grant Notley	70	-	-	1	+1	73,038	11.42%	−4.56%
Liberal	Bob Russell	20	3	-	-	−3	6,475	1.01%	−9.80%
Independent		3	1	-	-	−1	462	0.07%	−1.31%
Total		243	65	65	75	+10	639,862	100%	–
Source: Elections Alberta

Popular vote
PC	46.40%
Social Credit	41.10%
New Democratic	11.42%
Liberal	1.01%
Others	0.07%

Seats summary
PC	65.33%
Social Credit	33.33%
New Democratic	1.33%

== Daylight saving time plebiscite ==
Daylight saving time plebiscite
- August 30, 1971
- Do you favour province-wide daylight saving time?

Results
Choice	Votes	%
Yes	386,846	61.47%
No	242,431	38.53%
Total votes	629,277	100.00%

Alberta voters participated in a province-wide plebiscite on the question of whether or not to endorse a proposal to adopt daylight saving time (summer time). Voters endorsed the proposal by a wide margin, 61 per cent approving of the change.

=== Background ===
In 1948, the Government of Alberta formally set the province's time zone with the passage of The Daylight Saving Time Act, which mandated the entire province observe Mountain Standard Time, and prevented any municipality from observing daylight saving time or any other time zone. The legislation came after Calgary (1946 and 1947), and Edmonton (1946) held municipal plebiscites that approved the move to daylight saving time.

Alberta's urban municipalities were largely in favour of daylight saving time and pressured the provincial government to hold a provincial plebiscite or permit municipalities to observe daylight saving time. The effort in the legislature was spearheaded by Liberal MLA and Calgary Alderman Bill Dickie, who in March 1964 brought forward a motion to permit municipalities to hold plebiscites on the issue; the motion was defeated by the Social Credit government. At the time, Social Credit MLA William Patterson described daylight saving time as "that fandangled thing", and Minister Allen Russell Patrick stated municipal daylight saving time would be difficult for tourists to understand.

In February 1966, the Social Credit government finally gave in to the calls for a provincial plebiscite on daylight saving time, approving a motion submitted by Bill Dickie. The government responded on March 29, 1966, with Minister Alfred Hooke introducing An Act to amend The Daylight Saving Time Act (Bill 75) which amended the Daylight Saving Time Act to permit the government to hold a plebiscite on the issue. Alberta voters were asked the question "Do you favour Province-wide Daylight Saving Time?", during the 1967 Alberta general election. A narrow majority of 51.25 per cent of voters rejected daylight saving time. Most of the opposition was located in rural areas, while strong support for daylight saving time was seen in the cities of Calgary, Edmonton, Lethbridge, and Medicine Hat.

By 1967, each province besides Alberta and Saskatchewan had adopted daylight saving time. Many Alberta businesses provided for modified summer hours to coordinate with other provinces with daylight saving time, including the Alberta Stock Exchange which started at 7 a.m. to align with exchanges in Toronto and Montreal. Air Canada released a statement expressing the difficulty of distributing flight schedules with flights in Alberta.

After 25 years as Premier, Social Credit leader Ernest Manning stepped down on December 12, 1968, and his successor Harry Strom was sworn in as Premier. Only a few months later in April 1969, Strom announced Albertans would once again be asked to vote on daylight saving time in conjunction with the next scheduled provincial general election. During the announcement, Strom stated he was neutral on the topic and did not have a preference one way or another.

=== Campaign ===
Once again Calgary residents and businessmen Bill Creighton and David Matthews led a campaign for daylight saving times, just as they did in 1967, arguing the benefits of an additional hour of late sunlight for sports. Creighton learned from the successful and well-funded "no" campaign in 1967 led by the Alberta Council for Standard Time and Calgary lawyer and drive-in movie operator R. H. Barron. Creighton and Matthews formed the "Yes for Daylight Saving Society" to advocate during the leadup to the 1971 plebiscite, mirroring the organized approach of the "no" campaign in 1967. The Edmonton chapter had a $1,000 budget for advertising and even crowned a "Miss Daylight Saving Time", who made appearances throughout Edmonton. The arguments made for daylight saving time were similar to 1967, more amateur sport time, saving 150 hours of electricity each summer and aligning Alberta with the eight other provinces that observed daylight saving time.

The primary opposition to daylight saving time was described by members of the "Yes for Daylight Saving Society" as farmers, housewives and drive-in movie operators. In the 1967 campaign, the Alberta Council for Standard Time raised $30,000 for advertisements, but opposition was much less vocal during the 1971 campaign. Unifarm, an agricultural organization, publicly opposed daylight saving time, but it was not willing to spend significantly on a counter-campaign.

=== Aftermath ===
The 1971 plebiscite on daylight saving time resulted in an overwhelming majority of the Alberta population approving the transition. A statement from Unifarm, a farmer representative organization that opposed daylight saving time, stated that the organization anticipated the proposal would pass and downplayed the consequences for farmers.

The new Progressive Conservative government highlighted the change to observe daylight saving in the Speech from the Throne in early March 1972, and Attorney-General Merv Leitch announced on March 14, 1972 that Alberta would officially switch to daylight saving time on April 30, 1972, DST to last until October 29, 1972.

=== Results ===
Do you favour province-wide daylight saving time?
For	Against
386,846 61.47%	242,431 38.53%

Do you favour province-wide daylight saving time?
For	61.47%
Against	38.53%

For break down of results see individual districts

== Results by riding ==
=== Calgary ===
Electoral district	Candidates					Incumbent
Electoral district	Social Credit	PC	Liberal	NDP	Other	Incumbent
Calgary-Bow	Roy Wilson; 5,539; 47.84%	Bill Wearmouth; 4,563; 39.41%		Fred Spooner; 1,407; 12.15%		
Calgary-Buffalo	Don Luzzi; 5,238; 42.31%	Ronald H. Ghitter; 5,705; 46.09%		Jane Ann Summers; 1,364; 11.02%		
Calgary-Currie	Frederick C. Colborne; 4,679; 43.43%	Fred H. Peacock; 5,255; 48.78%		Margaret I. Jackson; 791; 7.34%		
Calgary-Egmont	Pat O'Byrne; 5,503; 40.94%	Merv Leitch; 6,791; 50.52%		Ron Stuart; 1,060; 7.89%		
Calgary-Elbow	L.A. Thorssen; 4,480; 41.63%	David J. Russell; 5,547; 51.54%		Dolores LeDrew; 688; 6.39%		
Calgary-Foothills	Jay Salmon; 5,885; 39.30%	Len F. Werry; 7,693; 51.38%		James Staples; 1,370; 9.15%		
Calgary-Glenmore	Raymond A. Kingsmith; 5,122; 37.21%	William Daniel Dickie; 7,658; 55.64%		George C. McGuire; 806; 5.86%		William Daniel Dickie
Calgary-McCall	George Ho Lem; 5,116; 43.70%	John Kushner; 4,187; 35.76%	Natalie Chapman; 151; 1.29%	Ted Takacs; 1,984; 16.95%		
Calgary-McKnight	Jim Richards; 5,368; 41.60%	Calvin E. Lee; 6,134; 47.54%	Philip T. Keuber; 246; 1.91%	Walter H. Siewert; 1,097; 8.50%		
Calgary-Millican	Arthur J. Dixon; 4,539; 48.74%	Norman Kwong; 2,973; 31.93%	Carole Walter; 153; 1.64%	Clarence Lacombe; 1,543; 16.57%		
Calgary-Mountain View	Albert W. Ludwig; 4,990; 51.11%	George Swales; 3,533; 36.19%		E.C. Baldwin; 1,149; 11.77%		
Calgary-North Hill	Robert A. Simpson; 4,900; 42.88%	Roy Alexander Farran; 4,961; 43.41%		Barry Pashak; 1,341; 11.74%	Carl L. Riech (Ind.); 121; 1.06%	
Calgary-West	Charles Grey; 4,319; 33.68%	Peter Lougheed; 7,049; 54.96%	Brian Stevenson; 333; 2.60%	Joe Yanchula; 1,066; 8.31%		Peter Lougheed

=== Edmonton ===
Electoral district	Candidates					Incumbent
Electoral district	Social Credit	PC	Liberal	NDP	Other	Incumbent
Edmonton-Avonmore	Joe G. Radstaak; 3,681; 39.87%	Horst A. Schmid; 3,913; 42.39%	John Kloster; 257; 2.78%	Bill McLean; 1,303; 14.11%		
Edmonton-Belmont	Werner G. Schmidt; 4,052; 33.42%	Albert Edward Hohol; 6,018; 49.63%		Gordon S.B. Wright; 1,960; 16.16%		
Edmonton-Beverly	Lou W. Heard; 3,050; 28.95%	Bill W. Diachuk; 4,471; 42.44%	John Lambert; 185; 1.76%	Barrie Chivers; 2,769; 26.28%		
Edmonton-Calder	Edgar H. Gerhart; 3,653; 32.03%	Tom Chambers; 5,931; 52.01%		Bill Glass; 1,772; 15.54%		
Edmonton-Centre	Gerry Mulhall; 2,622; 28.91%	Gordon Miniely; 5,281; 58.23%	Leonard Stahl; 197; 2.17%	Linda Gaboury; 931; 10.27%		Ambrose Holowach
Edmonton-Glenora	Lou Letourneau; 4,001; 31.09%	Lou Hyndman; 7,661; 59.53%	Sol Estrin; 322; 2.50%	Mary Lou Pocklington; 848; 6.59%		
Edmonton-Gold Bar	William F. Young; 3,778; 35.31%	William Yurko; 5,789; 54.10%		Tom Hennessey; 1,082; 10.11%		
Edmonton-Highlands	Ambrose Holowach; 2,748; 38.05%	David T. King; 2,848; 39.43%	Gerald Lorente; 154; 2.13%	Leroy Pearch; 1,368; 18.94%		
Edmonton-Jasper Place	John B. Ludwig; 3,789; 33.72%	Leslie Gordon Young; 5,758; 51.25%	Edwin Robert Daniels; 241; 2.15%	Kenneth Joseph Kerr; 1,402; 12.48%		John William Horan
Edmonton-Kingsway	Ethel Sylvia Wilson; 3,535; 30.92%	Kenneth R.H. Paproski; 6,316; 55.25%	Roderick Woodcock; 199; 1.74%	Paulette Atterbury; 1,290; 11.28%		
Edmonton-Meadowlark	Alexander Romaniuk; 3,839; 34.05%	Gerard Joseph Amerongen; 6,371; 56.52%		Alan J. Idiens; 1,035; 9.18%		
Edmonton-Norwood	Irene Domecki; 3,618; 35.80%	Catherine Chichak; 4,334; 42.89%		Sam Lee; 1,954; 19.34%		William Tomyn
Edmonton-Ottewell	Ronald Penner; 4,188; 32.73%	John G. Ashton; 7,009; 54.77%		Donald Haythorne; 1,314; 10.27%		
Edmonton-Parkallen	Gordon V. Rasmussen; 3,875; 35.84%	Neil S. Crawford; 5,300; 49.02%	Vic Yanda; 221; 2.04%	Hart Horn; 1,311; 12.13%		
Edmonton-Strathcona	Joseph Donovan Ross; 2,973; 32.55%	Julian Koziak; 4,541; 49.72%		Timothy Christian; 1,574; 17.23%		
Edmonton-Whitemud	Donald Murray Hamilton; 4,690; 33.06%	Donald Ross Getty; 8,201; 57.81%	James N. Tanner; 235; 1.66%	Joseph Mercredi; 936; 6.60%		

=== Rest of Alberta ===
Electoral district	Candidates					Incumbent
Electoral district	Social Credit	PC	Liberal	NDP	Other	Incumbent
Athabasca	Allan Gerlach; 2,585; 36.76%	Frank Appleby; 3,261; 46.37%		Peter E. Opryshko; 1,136; 16.15%		Antonio Aloisio
Banff-Cochrane	Slim Martin; 2,647; 37.52%	Clarence Copithorne; 3,801; 53.88%		Beverly Coulter; 420; 5.95%		Clarence Copithorne
Barrhead	Simon Tuininga; 1,651; 29.10%	Hugh F. Horner; 3,360; 59.23%		Herman Burke; 643; 11.33%		
Bonnyville	Lorne Mowers; 2,355; 43.31%	Donald Hansen; 2,523; 46.40%		Claire Gaines; 539; 9.91%		Romeo B. Lamothe
Bow Valley	Fred T. Mandeville; 3,584; 67.66%	Don Murray; 1,674; 31.60%				
Camrose	Laurence Rhierson; 3,965; 41.52%	Gordon Stromberg; 4,552; 47.67%		Keith Boulter; 988; 10.35%		Chester I. Sayers
Cardston	Edgar W. Hinman; 2,831; 53.56%	Larry L. Lang; 2,392; 45.25%				Alvin F. Bullock
Clover Bar	Walt A. Buck; 4,041; 48.86%	J. Devereux; 3,468; 41.93%		A. Karvonen; 736; 8.90%		Walt A. Buck
Cypress	Harry E. Strom; 2,777; 60.15%	Dave Berntson; 1,635; 35.41%		Tony de Souza; 196; 4.25%		Harry E. Strom
Drayton Valley	Thomas Johnson; 1,304; 26.62%	Rudolph Zander; 2,603; 53.14%		Alvin Harmacy; 963; 19.66%		
Drumheller	Gordon Edward Taylor; 5,044; 63.56%	Wayne Ohlhauser; 2,285; 28.79%		Dick Hehr; 547; 6.89%		
Edson	Rollie Mohr; 1,947; 28.58%	Robert W. Dowling; 3,900; 57.24%		Walter Seewitz; 749; 10.99%		Robert W. Dowling
Grande Prairie	William Bowes; 4,104; 38.42%	Winston Backus; 4,553; 42.63%		Arthur Macklin; 1,992; 18.65%		Ira McLaughlin
Hanna-Oyen	Clinton Keith French; 2,231; 45.58%	John Edward Butler; 2,216; 45.27%		Gordon Snell; 414; 8.46%		
Highwood	Edward P. Benoit; 2,941; 47.82%	Eldon C. Couey; 2,789; 45.35%		D. Larry McKillop; 389; 6.33%		
Innisfail	William Kenneth Ure; 2,915; 46.95%	Clifford L. Doan; 3,235; 52.10%				
Lac La Biche-McMurray	Dan Bouvier; 2,679; 52.97%	Elmer Roy; 1,927; 38.10%		Kenneth B. Orchard; 414; 8.19%		
Lacombe	Ivan Stonehocker; 2,582; 42.02%	John William Cookson; 3,094; 50.36%		Ragnar Johanson; 452; 7.36%		Allan Russell Patrick
Lesser Slave Lake	Dennis Barton; 1,830; 40.98%	Garth Roberts; 1,434; 32.11%	Stan Daniels; 246; 5.51%	Marie Carlson; 670; 15.00%	Allan Crawford (Ind.); 231; 5.17%	
Lethbridge-East	John V. Anderson; 5,341; 50.27%	Richard Barton; 4,374; 41.17%		Douglas Poile; 805; 7.58%		
Lethbridge-West	Richard David Gruenwald; 4,169; 54.39%	R.J. Gray; 2,751; 35.89%		Klaas Buijert; 670; 8.74%		
Little Bow	Raymond Albert Speaker; 3,400; 58.42%	John C. Green; 2,114; 36.32%		Edward H. Rodney; 295; 5.07%		Raymond Albert Speaker
Lloydminster	Campbell A. Hancock; 2,585; 42.95%	James Edgar Miller; 2,774; 46.09%		Lloyd Robertson; 635; 10.55%		
Macleod	Leighton E. Buckwell; 3,399; 50.67%	Danny Le Grandeur; 2,808; 41.86%		Sid J. Cornish; 470; 7.01%		Leighton E. Buckwell
Medicine Hat-Redcliff	William Wyse; 6,447; 48.68%	James Horsman; 4,140; 31.26%	Theodore Anhorn; 462; 3.49%	Frank Armstrong; 2,128; 16.07%		
Olds-Didsbury	Robert Curtis Clark; 4,346; 59.36%	Rudolf Pedersen; 2,578; 35.21%		William C. McCutcheon; 366; 5.00%		Robert Curtis Clark
Peace River	Robert H. Wiebe; 2,437; 38.04%	Al (Boomer) Adair; 3,188; 49.77%		Hans Jorgensen; 722; 11.27%		Robert H. Wiebe
Pincher Creek-Crowsnest	Charles Duncan Drain; 2,379; 42.82%	Morgan Johnson; 1,791; 32.24%		Clarence W. Smith; 1,355; 24.39%		Charles Duncan Drain
Ponoka	Neville S. Roper; 2,695; 43.69%	Donald J. McCrimmon; 2,712; 43.96%	Bernice Luce; 142; 2.30%	Ed Nelson; 598; 9.69%		Neville S. Roper
Red Deer	Fulton Rollings; 3,627; 34.79%	James L. Foster; 4,994; 47.90%	Len Patterson; 761; 7.30%	Ethel Taylor; 1,022; 9.80%		William Kenneth Ure
Redwater-Andrew	Michael Senych; 2,271; 34.67%	George Topolnisky; 3,277; 50.02%		Norman T. Flach; 968; 14.78%		
Rocky Mountain House	Harvey Staudinger; 2,472; 40.01%	Helen Hunley; 3,014; 48.78%		David Elliot; 657; 10.63%		Alfred J. Hooke
Sedgewick-Coronation	Ralph A. Sorenson; 2,272; 47.51%	Herb Losness; 2,005; 41.93%		Ron Chalmers; 489; 10.23%		Jack C. Hillman
Smoky River	Bernard Lamoureux; 1,604; 26.88%	Marvin Moore; 2,254; 37.77%		Victor Tardif; 2,074; 34.76%		
Spirit River-Fairview	Adolph O. Fimrite; 2,246; 35.99%	Don Moore; 1,439; 23.06%		Grant W. Notley; 2,400; 38.46%	Michael Zuk (Ind.); 110; 1.76%	
St. Albert	Keith Everitt; 3,592; 33.36%	William Ernest Jamison; 4,623; 42.94%	Robert A. Russell; 1,660; 15.42%	Elsie McMillan; 878; 8.15%		Keith Everitt
St. Paul	Raymond Reierson; 2,041; 35.07%	Mick Fluker; 2,661; 45.72%	Lawrence P. Coutu; 209; 3.59%	Laurent (Jeff) Dubois; 898; 15.43%		Raymond Reierson
Stettler	Galen C. Norris; 2,631; 47.10%	Jack G. Robertson; 2,925; 52.36%				Galen C. Norris
Stony Plain	Ralph A. Jespersen; 2,788; 40.12%	William Frederick Purdy; 3,348; 48.17%		Michael Crowson; 770; 11.08%		Ralph A. Jespersen
Taber-Warner	Douglas Miller; 4,077; 54.48%	Robert Bogle; 3,367; 45.00%				Douglas Miller
Three Hills	Raymond Ratzlaff; 2,970; 47.93%	Allan Warrack; 2,978; 48.06%		K. Robert Friesen; 220; 3.55%		Raymond Ratzlaff
Vegreville	Alex W. Gordey; 2,191; 32.05%	John S. Batiuk; 3,042; 44.49%		W.B. Welsh; 1,537; 22.48%		
Vermilion-Viking	Ashley H. Cooper; 2,420; 46.68%	Tom Newcomb; 2,232; 43.06%		Harry E. Yaremchuk; 507; 9.78%		
Wainwright	Henry A. Ruste; 3,311; 63.04%	Clifford Silas Smallwood; 1,366; 26.01%		Gary Luciow; 547; 10.42%		Henry A. Ruste
Wetaskiwin-Leduc	James D. Henderson; 5,334; 47.25%	Emanuel Pyrcz; 4,590; 40.66%		Lionel Udenberg; 1,336; 11.83%		
Whitecourt	Clyde Feero; 2,125; 33.76%	Peter Trynchy; 3,096; 49.19%	Arthur Yates; 101; 1.60%	Robert Price; 929; 14.76%		

== See also ==
- 1948 Electrification Plebiscite
- 1957 Liquor Plebiscite
- 1967 Daylight Saving Plebiscite
- List of Alberta political parties
