= 1968 Social Credit Party of Alberta leadership election =

The Alberta Social Credit leadership convention, 1968, took place in the Northern Alberta Jubilee Auditorium in Edmonton, Alberta, Canada, on December 4, 1968, to select a candidate to replace Ernest Manning as leader of the Social Credit Party of Alberta. Because Social Credit enjoyed a substantial majority in the Legislative Assembly of Alberta at the time and because convention dictates that the Lieutenant-Governor of Alberta asks the leader of the largest party in the legislature to form government, the contest was a de facto selection of the next Premier of Alberta. Harry Strom, long-time Minister of Agriculture and later Minister of Municipal Affairs in Manning's government, came out on top of a six-person field on the second ballot.

== Background ==
Ernest Manning had been Social Credit's leader and premier of Alberta since he was selected by his caucus to succeed deceased party founder William Aberhart in 1943. Though still not an old man, he had decided to retire as premier after a record-setting 25 years, sensing the mood of change that was beginning to grip the province - his son, Preston Manning, claimed in 2003 that his father was concerned that Social Credit might lose the next election.

Social Credit had never held a leadership contest before. As founder, Aberhart had emerged as the unquestioned leader in advance of the 1935 election, and Manning was the obvious and unanimous choice of his caucus after Aberhart's death in 1943.

The initial favourite was Anders Aalborg, Manning's provincial treasurer. He wanted the job, but declined to enter the race due to health concerns. This left the field open to other, less well-known, candidates.

== Candidates ==
There were five candidates for most of the pre-convention period, with veteran Alfred Hooke entering at the last minute before the convention. The candidates were

- Harry Strom - Strom had served in Manning's cabinet since 1962, and was the favourite of many young Social Crediters because of his perceived openness to reform. As a senior cabinet minister, he also attracted the support of many members of the party's ruling class, including Aalborg. John Barr, a party functionary at the time and later chief of staff to Strom's education minister Bob Clark, characterized Strom as "just a tall, good-natured guy whom everybody liked".
- Gordon Taylor - Taylor served as Minister of Highways for almost Manning's entire time in politics. A lifelong bachelor, he was well respected and popular, but was perceived as a single issue politician and did not have a record of achievement outside of transportation issues.
- Raymond Reierson - Reierson had held a number of portfolios in Manning's cabinets, and was seen as able and confident.
- Edgar Gerhart - The son of long-time Manning minister C. E. Gerhart, Gerhart was seen as a possible renewal candidate. He was one of only two lawyers in the rural-dominated Social Credit caucus, but did not have the significant cabinet experience of most of his rivals, having served little over a year in cabinet.
- Walt Buck - A dentist and backbencher from Fort Saskatchewan, Buck was the campaign's dark horse. He was a rookie MLA having been elected for the first time in 1967.
- Alfred Hooke - Hooke entered the race just before the convention. He had been in the legislature since Social Credit's landslide win in the 1935 election—as long as Manning himself—and campaigned on a conservative platform attacking welfare abusers and perceived disloyalty in the Strom camp, proposing a return to "traditional values".

== Campaign ==
The campaign aroused little interest, and a poll in the Spring of 1968 found that well over half of respondents had not selected a candidate (the same poll placed Taylor in the lead with 9.8% of the vote, followed by Strom at 5.3% and Reierson and 3.6%). Strom enjoyed the strongest organization, and entered the convention as the favourite.

== The convention ==
As delegates arrived at the December 4 convention, they were greeted by an enormous red and white billboard supporting Reierson and a rock band supporting Gerhart. Inside the convention centre, an oom-pah band was trying to get a snake dance going. Party secretary Orvis Kennedy was trying to prevent a resolution in favour of the Social Credit youth branch, endorsing the legalization of marijuana from making the convention floor (he succeeded).

The convention was attended by delegates elected by party members by constituency. A candidate required a majority of votes to win. On the first ballot, Strom led with 47.6% of the vote, well ahead of the other candidates (Taylor, in second place, had 16.5%). Hooke, in last place, was automatically eliminated, and Gerhart, in a disappointing fifth, dropped out as well. The third place Reierson made his way to the stage to make an announcement, but was physically obstructed by Kennedy. Breaking free, Reierson complained "I never thought I'd live to see the day that a Social Credit candidate would be denied the right to speak to his own supporters" announcing his withdrawal and endorsement of Taylor. Walt Buck, in fourth place, stayed on the ballot, despite entreaties from the Taylor and Reierson camps.

On the second ballot, Strom retained his large lead, although Taylor gained ground. Well above the majority threshold, he was elected leader.

== Results ==
First ballot
| Candidate | Votes | Percentage |
|---|---|---|
| Harry Strom | 814 | 47.6% |
| Gordon Taylor | 282 | 16.5% |
| Raymond Reierson | 255 | 14.9% |
| Walt Buck | 184 | 10.8% |
| Edgar Gerhart | 137 | 8.0% |
| Alfred Hooke | 38 | 2.2% |
Second ballot
| Candidate | Votes | Percentage |
| Harry Strom | 915 | 54.9% |
| Gordon Taylor | 606 | 36.3% |
| Walt Buck | 147 | 8.8% |

== Aftermath ==
Harry Strom became premier of Alberta a week after the convention. However, his government proved unable to deal with the province's desire for change, and was soundly defeated in the 1971 election by Peter Lougheed's Progressive Conservatives, marking the end of the thirty-five year Social Credit dynasty in Alberta, and the beginning of the Progressive Conservatives' still-longer tenure.
