= Edgar Gerhart =

Canadian politician (1923–1992)

Edgar Henry Gerhart

Member of the Legislative Assembly of Alberta
- In office August 5, 1952 – June 18, 1959 Serving with Ernest Manning, Abe Miller, John Page, James Prowse, Elmer Roper, Joseph Ross and Harold Tanner (1952-1959)
- Preceded by: Clayton Adams and Lou Heard
- Succeeded by: District Abolished
- Constituency: Edmonton
- In office June 18, 1959 – June 18, 1959
- Preceded by: New District
- Succeeded by: District Abolished
- Constituency: Edmonton North West

Minister of Municipal Affairs
- In office June 29, 1967 – July 16, 1968
- Premier: Ernest Manning
- Preceded by: Alfred Hooke
- Succeeded by: Harry Strom
- In office December 12, 1968 – May 27, 1969
- Premier: Harry Strom
- Preceded by: Harry Strom
- Succeeded by: Fred Colborne

Attorney General
- In office December 10, 1968 – September 10, 1971
- Premier: Harry Strom
- Preceded by: Ernest Manning
- Succeeded by: Merv Leitch

Personal details
- Born: December 18, 1923 Drumheller, Alberta, Canada
- Died: May 25, 1992 (aged 68)
- Party: Social Credit
- Spouse: Margaret Tiffin
- Parent: Clarence Gerhart (father)
- Occupation: lawyer judge and politician

Edgar Henry Gerhart (December 18, 1923 – May 25, 1992) was a lawyer, judge and politician from Alberta, Canada. He served in the Legislative Assembly of Alberta from 1952 to 1971 as a member of the Social Credit caucus in government. He served as a cabinet minister in the governments of Ernest Manning and Harry Strom from 1967 to 1971.

== Early life ==
Edgar Henry Gerhart was born on December 18, 1923, in the town of Drumheller, Alberta. His father was Clarence Gerhart served as a member of the Legislative Assembly representing Acadia-Coronation from 1940 to 1955, as well as several portfolio's in Premier Ernest Manning's cabinet, including Minister of Municipal Affairs. Edgar Gerhart would marry his wife Margaret Tiffin on March 4, 1944, in Calgary, and have five children together. Gerhart would attend the University of Alberta studying pharmacy like his father.

== Political career ==
Gerhart first ran for a seat to the Alberta Legislature in the 1952 general election. Running under the Social Credit banner, he took the fifth seat in the multi-member electoral district of Edmonton. He was re-elected in the 1955 Alberta general election.

The Edmonton electoral district was broken up into single-member ridings in 1959, and Gerhart ran for re-election in the new district of Edmonton North West. He defeated Progressive Conservative candidate Ned Feehan and two other candidates with about 40% of the popular vote.

In 1960, Gerhart ran for a seat on Edmonton city council in the municipal election while still an MLA. He finished 12th out of 15 candidates, short of a place on council.

In the 1963 general election, Gerhart faced Ned Feehan again as well as future MLA Grant Notley. He retained his seat by a large margin.

In the 1967 general election, Gerhart defeated Progressive Conservative candidate Paul Norris by less than 500 votes.

Premier Ernest Manning appointed Gerhart Minister of Municipal Affairs on June 29, 1967. He held that portfolio until July 16, 1968, when he resigned to run for the leadership of the Social Credit Party. Gerhart finished fifth out of six in the 1968 leadership election and dropped out of the race after the first ballot. The new premier, Harry Strom, appointed Gerhart Attorney General on December 10, 1968. Two days later he also reassumed the Municipal Affairs portfolio, which he held until May 27, 1969.

In 1971 Edmonton North West abolished, and Gerhart ran for re-election that year in the new electoral district of Edmonton-Calder. He was defeated by Progressive Conservative candidate Tom Chambers.
