= Harry Strom =

Premier of Alberta from 1968 to 1971

The Honourable Harry Strom
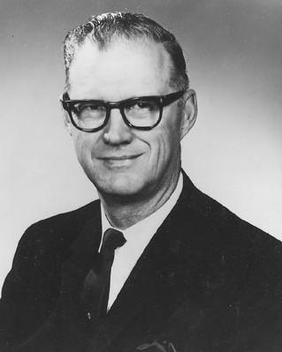
- Strom, c. 1970

9th Premier of Alberta
- In office December 12, 1968 – September 10, 1971
- Monarch: Elizabeth II
- Lieutenant Governor: Grant MacEwan
- Preceded by: Ernest Manning
- Succeeded by: Peter Lougheed

Member of the Legislative Assembly of Alberta
- In office June 29, 1955 – March 25, 1975
- Preceded by: James Underdahl
- Succeeded by: Alan Hyland
- Constituency: Cypress

Alberta Minister of Municipal Affairs
- In office July 16, 1968 – December 12, 1968
- Preceded by: Edgar Gerhart
- Succeeded by: Edgar Gerhart

Alberta Minister of Agriculture
- In office October 15, 1962 – July 16, 1968
- Preceded by: Leonard Halmrast
- Succeeded by: Henry Ruste

Leader of the Official Opposition in Alberta
- In office December 10, 1971 – November 22, 1972
- Preceded by: Peter Lougheed
- Succeeded by: James Henderson

Personal details
- Born: Harry Edwin Strom; July 7, 1914 Burdett, Alberta, Canada
- Died: October 2, 1984 (aged 70) Edmonton, Alberta, Canada
- Resting place: Medicine Hat, Alberta, Canada
- Party: Social Credit
- Spouse: Ruth Johnson
- Children: 6
- Profession: Farmer

Harry Edwin Strom (July 7, 1914 – October 2, 1984) was the ninth premier of Alberta, from 1968 to 1971. His two-and-a-half years as Premier were the last of the thirty-six-year Social Credit dynasty, as his defeat by Peter Lougheed saw its replacement by a new era Progressive Conservative government.

Alberta's first native-born Premier, Strom was born in Burdett, Alberta. He worked most of his young adult life on the family farm, and was also actively involved in his church. After a stint in municipal politics, he ran for the Legislative Assembly of Alberta in the 1955 provincial election, and was elected. In 1962, Manning appointed him to his cabinet as Minister of Agriculture, a position he held until 1967 when he was appointed Minister of Municipal Affairs. When Manning decided to resign in 1968, Strom became a candidate to succeed him, and finished on top of a six candidate field.

As Premier, Strom undertook a number of initiatives, especially in education and youth-related fields, but was politically ineffective. He lacked both charisma and an overriding sense of purpose, and his government gradually lost popularity. In the 1971 election, his government was handily defeated by Lougheed's Progressive Conservatives. Strom served as opposition leader for two years, but soon relinquished the position and did not seek re-election in 1975. After leaving politics, Strom returned to farming. He died in 1984.

== Early life ==
Strom was born in Burdett, Alberta, on July 7, 1914. His parents, Nils Hjalmar Strom (1877–1928) and Elna Maria Olivia Ekensteen (1883–1969), were second generation Swedish Canadians. He attended school in Burdett before moving to Calgary to attend high school at East Calgary High School and Calgary Technical High School, where he studied mechanics. In 1931, he received a certificate from the Provincial Institute of Technology and Art. His father died the same year, and Strom returned home to help his mother with the operation of the family farm.

On October 27, 1938, Strom married Ruth Johnson, with whom he would have six children—Howard, Faith, Beverly, Brian, Ronald, and Arlene. The family attended the Evangelical Free Church of Canada in Bow Island until 1962. There, Strom served as Sunday school teacher, deacon, and board chair, in addition to his twenty years of involvement with the church's Overseas Missions Board. Besides his activities with the church, Strom was involved in the Forty Mile Rural Electrification Association, the Burdett Home and School Association, and the Agricultural Improvement Association of Burdett.

== Entry into politics ==
In 1943, Harry Strom was elected to the council of the County of Forty Mile No. 8 in southern Alberta. He served on local school boards at around the same time.

=== MLA and cabinet minister ===
In the 1955 provincial election, Strom ran as the Social Credit candidate in Cypress, where the incumbent, Social Crediter James Underdahl, was not seeking re-election. He easily defeated his only opponent, Liberal Joe Flaig, and was elected to the Legislative Assembly of Alberta. He would be re-elected to this seat in each of the 1959, 1963, 1967, and 1971 elections, always winning more than 60% of the vote.

In October 1962, Premier Ernest Manning appointed Strom Minister of Agriculture. In this capacity, he undertook a series of initiatives related to water use, including developing an agreement with Saskatchewan and Manitoba of the use of water emanating from the eastern slopes of Alberta's Rocky Mountains. He also passed a series of legislation, including the Soil Conservation Act and Crop Insurance Act, and undertook a major departmental organization. The Alberta Agriculture Hall of Fame, which inducted Strom in 1985, credited him with expanding the use of irrigation in the province and for being a key figure leading up to the signing of a 1973 cost-sharing agreement on the subject with the federal government. He also served as Minister of Municipal Affairs for the last five months of the Manning government.

=== Leadership election ===
When Manning decided to retire in 1968, he called a key group of senior ministers to his office to advise them of his decision. This group included Strom, Treasurer Anders Aalborg, Industry Minister Russ Patrick, Education Minister Randy McKinnon. Aalborg was the natural choice to succeed Manning, but he had health problems and declined to run. Strom had no desire for the job and rejected any suggestion from the others that he be a candidate.

This rejection was not to last: a group of influential young Social Crediters, including the Premier's son Preston, started a movement to draft Strom. They settled on him because he was personally popular among party members and because he had displayed an openness to new ideas in the past. Strom accepted their overtures, but as late as a week before he announced his candidacy he was still offering to step aside in favour of another candidate of the young Turks' choice.

Strom's campaign theme was "the social development of Alberta", and this general theme encompassed such diverse policy planks as a citizens' committee on constitutional reform, a head start program for disadvantaged youth, commissions on the future of urban planning and education, an expansion of the role of backbenchers in policy development, and the opening of a branch of the Premier's office in Calgary. Though he entered as the favourite, a poll in spring 1969 showed him running second of five candidates behind Minister of Transportation Gordon Taylor. However, he had the strongest organization of any candidate, thanks in large part to his young backers, and overcame this deficit by the fall.

At the convention, Strom won a large plurality on the first ballot, finishing with nearly three times of the votes of the second place Taylor. Though the third place Raymond Reierson threw his support to the Transportation Minister before the second ballot, the results on this were decisive: Strom gained the support of more than a hundred new delegates and won a clear majority.

== Premier ==
Harry Strom became Premier December 12, 1968 and served until the 1971 election, when his government was defeated by Peter Lougheed's Progressive Conservatives. This tenure makes him the fourth shortest-serving former Premier in Alberta's history, after Dave Hancock, Jim Prentice, and Richard G. Reid.

=== Policy initiatives ===
Many of Strom's policy initiatives revolved around education and youth. He created the Alberta Service Corps, which allowed young Albertans to work summers on public services and environmental projects for remuneration, and which was one of several models for the federal government's later Katimavik program. In response to increasing use of illicit drugs by Alberta youth, his government, led by Education Minister Bob Clark, inserted anti-narcotics messages into the province's school curriculum. Strom implemented trial kindergarten programs in Edmonton and Calgary—the Calgary program, provided jointly by an inner-city community association and the Mount Royal College, has been called one of Canada's first public-private partnerships. His interest in educational matters was perhaps best exemplified by his government's Commission on Educational Planning, which travelled the province to solicit Albertans' views and whose final report, A Choice of Futures, was credited by Barr as setting "the tone and direction for education in Alberta for the next generation". The Strom government also made substantial reforms to Alberta's post-secondary education system, expanding distance learning through the creation of Athabasca University and laying the foundation's for ACCESS television, and effectively creating the province's College (as distinct from University) system. This latter move led to the creation of Grant MacEwan College.

Strom also took a number of non-educational policy initiative, such as naming Jim Henderson as the province's first Environment Minister. Other priorities were the reform of the Premier's Office and the establishment of an Intergovernmental Affairs Secretariat, converted by Peter Lougheed's government into a full ministry under Don Getty. In 1970, the government established the Alberta Alcoholism and Drug Abuse Commission.

=== Leadership style ===
Strom resisted leadership and saw himself as a conciliator, charged with maintaining unity among his cabinet and caucus. Soon after becoming Premier, Strom chief of staff Don Hamilton and strategist Owen Anderson scheduled strategy meetings with agendas drawn from Strom's leadership platform. The meetings did not lead to action, and some began to grumble that "talking about decisions was a form of action". According to Barr, Hamilton eventually started using the same agenda every week, with only the date changed, and Strom did not notice.

Strom was not an effective speaker and often would not look at the text of his speeches until he was delivering them. Realizing this, Hamilton once handed him a folder with nothing but a paper reading "Sock it to 'em, Harry" before the Premier was to give a speech at the University of Alberta. The Premier opened the folder and, as he became visibly alarmed, gratefully received the real speech when an aide brought it to him.

Strom also resisted calling an early election to give his government a fresh mandate, despite Hamilton's impassioned advocacy for this course of action. He was no more positive towards Anderson's proposals for a radical overhaul of the party, including the computerization of political data (such as voting trends, demographic shifts, and polling results) and the purchase of an office building to make the party a profit and free it from the need for fundraising. The ideas that Strom did not reject outright were referred to committees and study groups where they were watered down or shelved.

Despite these failings, Strom was recognized as possessing a number of virtues: he was kind, considerate, and honest. Most of all, he was humble: he had not sought the party leadership and notoriously asked after being repeatedly addressed as "Premier" at his first cabinet meeting why it could not "just be plain 'Harry' anymore". When travelling to Ottawa, he stayed at the un-posh Skyline Hotel and ate meals in its basement cafeteria, where he ordered bread and pea soup for $0.25. On final analysis, Barr concludes that this temperament, commendable though it may be, was unsuited to running the government of an emerging economic powerhouse.

=== Defeat ===
Though the legislature's mandate from the 1967 election was not due to expire until May 1972, five years after it started, convention in Canadian politics is for legislatures to be dissolved every four years or less. Accordingly, Strom resolved to call an election in 1971, sometime between May and September. He briefly considered a spring campaign, in the hopes that the planting season would have farmers feeling optimistic and therefore inclined to support the incumbent government. However, after concluding that farmers would not react well to going to the polls in the middle of planting or harvest season, Strom finally settled on August 30. A campaign committee was assembled, and recommended a budget of $580,000.

The party recruited star candidates, including Calgary alderman George Ho Lem and former Calgary Stampeder star Don Luzzi (Edmonton alderman and future mayor Cec Purves was defeated in his bid to win the Social Credit nomination in Edmonton-Strathcona from Strathcona Centre incumbent Joseph Donovan Ross), but was handicapped in these efforts by Strom's unwillingness to offer cabinet posts or other incentives to potential new candidates. Strom's lack of personal charisma was also a liability: tellingly, of the large budget recommended by the central committee, only $72,000 was recommended for use on television advertising, where Strom did not shine. The party tried to revitalize the Premier's image through publicity movies, though efforts were mixed. In one, which was pulled after a single showing, Strom appeared scowling in his living room, urging Albertans to lower their expectations of government. Another, produced by Tommy Banks and showing Strom in a variety of settings talking about the province's changing face, was more successful.

The campaign did not give Social Credit partisans much reason for optimism. Strom did not draw the crowds that Progressive Conservative opposition leader Peter Lougheed did, although an August 25 rally in Edmonton's Jubilee Auditorium featuring speeches by Strom and Manning was full. After criticizing the Conservatives' medicare platform, which promised free medicare to Albertans older than 65, as spendthrift, Strom announced Social Credit's barely cheaper alternative: medicare to Albertans older than 65 for one dollar per month. The Edmonton Journal, which had earlier published a poll showing that a plurality of Edmontonians intended to vote PC, endorsed Lougheed for Premier. Election night saw Social Credit defeated, taking 25 seats to the P.C.s' 49. Though Social Credit's share of the vote had only slipped slightly, Lougheed benefited from a substantial reduction in the New Democrats' vote and a near-collapse of the Liberals'. The party was also decimated in the province's two largest cities, losing all of its seats in Edmonton and all but five in Calgary.

Strom conceded defeat in Edmonton and returned home to Medicine Hat.

== Out of office and legacy ==
Strom continued as Social Credit leader, serving as leader of the opposition, until 1972, when he resigned and was replaced by Werner Schmidt. He continued in the legislature until the 1975 election, in which he did not seek re-election. After leaving politics, he returned to his farm and his involvement with his church. He died of cancer October 2, 1984, and was buried in Medicine Hat.

In honour of his political services, Strom received honorary Doctor of Laws degrees from the University of Calgary (1969), the University of Lethbridge (1979), and the University of Alberta (1980). While several of his acts as premier had consequences extending well beyond his term, today he is largely forgotten, though he experienced a brief resurgence in name recognition in 2007. That year, critics of Ed Stelmach compared Stelmach to Strom, with the insinuation being that Stelmach was destined to lose the next election and be the last of the Progressive Conservative dynasty in the same way that Strom was the last of the Social Credit dynasty. In the end, it would not be until the 2015 provincial election under the leadership of Jim Prentice that the Progressive Conservatives would be defeated, with some pundits also comparing Prentice to Strom.

Ruth Strom, his wife died in 2011.

== Electoral record ==
=== As party leader ===
1971 Alberta provincial election
Party	Party leader	# of candidates	Seats			Popular vote		
Party	Party leader	# of candidates	1967	1971	% Change	#	%	% Change
Progressive Conservative	Peter Lougheed	75	6	49	+717%	296,934	46.40%	+20.40%
Social Credit	Harry Strom	75	55	25	-54.5%	262,953	41.10%	-3.5%
New Democrats	Grant Notley	70	-	1		73,038	11.42%	-4.56%
Liberal	Bob Russell	20	3	-	-100%	6,475	1.01%	-9.80%
Independent		3	1	-	-100%	462	0.07%	-1.31%
Total		243	65	75	+15.4%	639,862	100%	

=== As MLA ===
1971 Alberta general election results (Cypress)		Turnout 78.8%	
Affiliation	Candidate	Votes	%
Social Credit	Harry Strom	2,777	60.3%
Progressive Conservative	Dave Berntson	1,635	35.5%
New Democratic	Tony de Souza	196	4.3%
1967 Alberta general election results (Cypress)		Turnout 60.5%	
Affiliation	Candidate	Votes	%
Social Credit	Harry Strom	2,577	77.0%
New Democratic	William McFall	769	23.0%
1963 Alberta general election results (Cypress)		Turnout 65.9%	
Affiliation	Candidate	Votes	%
Social Credit	Harry Strom	3,030	77.9%
Liberal	Alvin Reiman	861	22.1%
1959 Alberta general election results (Cypress)		Turnout 70.8%	
Affiliation	Candidate	Votes	%
Social Credit	Harry Strom	3,199	79.4%
Progressive Conservative	Wayne Anderson	831	20.6%
1955 Alberta general election results (Cypress)		Turnout 71.7%	
Affiliation	Candidate	Votes	%
Social Credit	Harry Strom	2,668	68.9%
Liberal	Joe Flaig	1,205	31.1%

=== Party leadership contests ===
1968 Social Credit Party of Alberta leadership election
Second ballot
Candidate	Votes	Percentage
Harry Strom	915	54.9%
Gordon Taylor	606	36.3%
Walt Buck	147	8.8%
First ballot
Candidate	Votes	Percentage
Harry Strom	814	47.6%
Gordon Taylor	282	16.5%
Raymond Reierson	255	14.9%
Walt Buck	184	10.8%
Edgar Gerhart	137	8.0%
Alfred Hooke	38	2.2%
