= Merv Leitch =

Canadian politician

Clarence Mervin "Merv" Leitch QC

Member of the Legislative Assembly of Alberta
- In office 1971–1982
- Preceded by: New district
- Succeeded by: David Carter
- Constituency: Calgary-Egmont

Attorney General
- In office September 10, 1971 – March 1975
- Preceded by: Edgar Gerhart
- Succeeded by: James Foster

Provincial Treasurer
- In office March 1975 – March 1979
- Preceded by: Gordon Miniely
- Succeeded by: Lou Hyndman

Minister of Energy and Natural Resources
- In office March 1979 – November 1982
- Preceded by: Don Getty
- Succeeded by: John Zaozirny

Personal details
- Born: January 13, 1926 Creelman, Saskatchewan
- Died: June 30, 1990 (aged 64)
- Party: Progressive Conservative
- Education: University of Alberta
- Occupation: politician, lawyer

Clarence Mervin "Merv" Leitch QC (January 13, 1926 – June 30, 1990) was a lawyer and politician from Alberta, Canada. He served as a member of the Legislative Assembly of Alberta from 1971 to 1982 sitting with the governing Progressive Conservative caucus. During his time in office he served numerous cabinet portfolios in the government of Peter Lougheed, including as Attorney General. He was named a Queen's Counsel in December 1971.

== Early life ==
Born in Creelman, Saskatchewan, on 13 January 1926, Leitch moved to Edmonton, Alberta in 1948 to attend the law program at the University of Alberta. He graduated in 1952. During his time at the University of Alberta, Leitch joined the Delta Upsilon fraternity, serving as President from 1949 - 1951, and lived in Rutherford House alongside Peter Lougheed and Allan Warrack.

Following graduation, Leitch moved to Calgary where led an active and high profile legal career. He served as President of the Calgary Bar Association and as a Partner in the Macleod Dixon Law Firm and on the Board of the Canadian Institute of Resources Law and was a director on several corporations.

In 1971, Leitch left his legal practice to pursue a political career.

== Political career ==
Leitch ran for a seat to the Alberta Legislature in the 1971 Alberta general election. He won a hotly contested race in the new electoral district of Calgary-Egmont to pick up the seat for the Progressive Conservative party who would form government that election. He defeated Social Credit candidate Pat O'Byrne by over 1,000 votes to win the district.

After the election Premier Peter Lougheed appointed Leitch to the Executive Council of Alberta. He served as the Attorney General in the first Progressive Conservative government cabinet. At Premier Lougheed's request, he prepared the first piece of legislation for the Progressive Conservative government in 1972 Bill 1 the Alberta Bill of Rights, which was introduced by Premier Lougheed. Leitch included a "notwithstanding clause", which inspired Section 33 of the Canadian Charter of Rights and Freedoms. in the He ran for his second term in office in the 1975 Alberta general election, this time with ministerial advantage. He was returned with a landslide winning over 10,000 votes while the opposition votes collapsed.

Premier Lougheed promoted Leitch to the Provincial Treasurer portfolio in 1975. He held that portfolio while running for his third term in office in the 1979 Alberta general election. He would drop a significant share of his popular vote but still win his district with a landslide. The opposition candidates failed to make any gains. Leitch was appointed to the Minister of Energy and Natural Resources portfolio and held that until he retired from provincial politics at dissolution of the legislature in 1982.

== Late life ==
Leitch died on 30 June 1990, following a battle with cancer.

In recognition of his contributions to the legal and political field in Alberta, Peter Lougheed and the University of Calgary created a lecture series, now the Merv Leitch Q.C. Memorial Visiting Chair, in his honor. Every year a new person is designated as a visiting chair in the University of Calgary Faculty of Law to give lectures in his honor; the lecture is also given at his alma mater, the University of Alberta. These have been chiefly within the fields of natural resource and constitutional law. Annual scholarships for law students in their second and third years at each of the Universities of Calgary and Alberta is also awarded in his honor.
