= Walt Buck =

Canadian politician (1930–2013)

Walter Buck

MLA for Clover Bar
- In office 1967–1989
- Preceded by: Floyd Baker
- Succeeded by: Kurt Gesell

Personal details
- Born: Walter Alexander Buck; December 16, 1930 Elk Point, Alberta
- Died: March 14, 2013 (aged 82) Fort Saskatchewan, Alberta
- Party: Social Credit; Independent; Representative
- Occupation: Dentist

Walter Alexander Buck (December 16, 1930 – March 14, 2013) was a provincial politician and dentist from Alberta, Canada. He served as a member of the Legislative Assembly of Alberta (MLA) from 1967 to 1989. During his time in office he served in numerous party caucuses and as an Independent.

== Political career ==
Buck ran for a seat in the Legislative Assembly in the 1967 Alberta general election. He won the electoral district of Clover Bar by a wide margin to hold it for the governing Social Credit Party of Alberta. While still a rookie MLA, Buck ran for the leadership of the Social Credit party in the 1968 leadership election following the retirement of longtime premier Ernest Manning.

Buck survived the first round of balloting but distantly trailed Harry Strom and two other candidates to end in fourth place with 10.8% of the delegates. On the second ballot his votes dropped and he ended up with just 8.8% of the convention delegates while Harry Strom had a clear majority. Buck was not invited into Strom's cabinet after he became leader of the party and Premier of the province and thus remained in the back benches.

Buck ran for a second term in office in the 1971 general election. He won a tight three-way race just edging out Progressive Conservative candidate J. Devereux in an election that ended the Socreds' 36-year run in government. He would reclaim a large majority with his biggest win in terms of popular vote to date when he was elected to his third term in the 1975 general election.

Buck won his fourth term with a massive landslide and the largest plurality of his career in the 1979 general election. This was his last win under the Social Credit party banner. After a disastrous attempt to dissolve the Social Credit Party at a convention held in 1982, parliamentary leader Raymond Speaker and Buck resigned from the party to run as independents in the 1982 provincial election. Buck held his seat in a tight race with Stan Berg of the Progressive Conservatives and two other candidates.

Buck and Speaker attempted to form the official opposition as an Independent caucus as had been done after the 1940 general election, over the Alberta New Democratic Party (NDP) which also had two members. The speaker denied them opposition status and the same caucus funding that had been provided to the NDP and limited the number of questions that could be asked.

The pair decided to form a new political party in 1984, the Representative Party of Alberta. It branded itself as a modern version of Social Credit and opened its doors to former Socreds who had left the party. Buck ran for re-election in the 1986 general election under that banner winning a sizable majority in his riding. Buck retired from provincial politics at dissolution of the assembly in 1989.

Buck died of stomach cancer in 2013 at Fort Saskatchewan. He was 82.
