= Bud Miller =

Canadian politician (1923–2015)

Member of the Legislative Assembly of Alberta
- In office 1971–1986
- Preceded by: New District
- Succeeded by: Doug Cherry
- Constituency: Lloydminster

Minister of Public Lands and Wildlife
- In office 1979 – November 1982
- Preceded by: Allan Warrack
- Succeeded by: Donald Sparrow

Personal details
- Born: James Edgar Miller; March 31, 1923 Kitscoty, Alberta, Canada
- Died: January 23, 2015 (aged 91) Edmonton, Alberta, Canada
- Party: Alberta Liberal; Progressive Conservative

James "Bud" Edgar Miller (March 31, 1923 – January 23, 2015) was a provincial level politician and farmer from Alberta, Canada. He served as a member of the Legislative Assembly of Alberta from 1971 to 1986. During his time in provincial office he served in the Executive Council as the Minister of Public Lands and Wildlife from 1975 to 1982.

== Early life ==
James Edgar Miller was born in Kitscoty, Alberta. He grew up on his family farm and later attended the University of Saskatchewan where he earned a degree in Agriculture.

== Political career ==
Miller ran for a seat to the Alberta Legislature for the first time in the 1948 Alberta general election in the electoral district of Alexandra. He ran under the Liberal banner while he was still attending the University of Saskatchewan. The election would see him finish in last place in the field of three candidates losing to Anders Aalborg of Social Credit.

Miller ran for a second attempt at office in the 1971 Alberta general election. He won the new electoral district of Lloydminster under the Progressive Conservative banner. The race was hotly contested with Miller just barely edging out Campbell Hancock to pick up the district. He ran for a second term in the 1975 Alberta general election. In that election Miller more than doubled his popular vote defeating New Democrat challenger Dave Listoe in a straight fight.

He ran for a third term in office this time defeating three other candidates with a landslide margin to hold his seat. After the election Premier Peter Lougheed appointed Miller to the Executive Council of Alberta to serve as the Minister of Public Lands and Wildlife.

He ran for a fourth term in office in the 1982 general election and won the biggest plurality of his career. Miller did not return to cabinet after the 1982 election. After his term was over he retired from provincial politics at the dissolution of the legislature in 1986.

== Late life ==
After leaving the provincial legislature Miller continued to serve on provincial and federal boards. He later became a council for the Kitscoty town council.

He died at the Grey Nuns Hospital in Edmonton at the age of 91 on January 23, 2015.

Bud Miller All Seasons Park a 90-acre (360,000 m2) park in the city of Lloydminster is named in his honor.
