= Henry Ruste =

Canadian politician

Henry Arild Ruste

Member of the Legislative Assembly of Alberta
- In office June 29, 1955 – March 25, 1975
- Preceded by: William Masson
- Succeeded by: Charles Stewart
- Constituency: Wainwright

Minister of Lands and Forests
- In office February 16, 1965 – July 16, 1968
- Preceded by: Norman Willmore
- Succeeded by: Alfred Hooke
- In office December 12, 1968 – May 20, 1969
- Preceded by: Alfred Hooke
- Succeeded by: Joseph Ross

Minister of Agriculture
- In office July 16, 1968 – September 10, 1971
- Preceded by: Harry Strom
- Succeeded by: Hugh Horner

Personal details
- Born: August 29, 1917 Wainwright, Alberta
- Died: October 31, 1993 (aged 76)
- Party: Social Credit
- Occupation: politician

Henry Arild Ruste (August 29, 1917 – October 31, 1993) was a Canadian politician from Alberta. He served in the Legislative Assembly of Alberta from 1955 to 1975 as a member of the Social Credit Party. Ruste served as a cabinet minister in the governments of Premier Ernest Manning and Harry Strom from 1965 to 1971.

== Political career ==
Ruste was first elected in the 1955 Alberta general election in the electoral district of Wainwright. He defeated three other candidates by a comfortable margin to hold the seat for his party. In the 1959 general election he defeated three other candidates by a landslide., and in the 1963 election he improved his margin of victory from the last election.

Premier Ernest Manning appointed Ruste to the Executive Council of Alberta on February 16, 1965 as the Minister of Lands and Forests. Ruste ran for a fourth term in the 1967 general election and won a straight fight against NDP candidate Glenn Valleau with almost 85% of the popular vote.

On July 16, 1968 Premier Harry Strom moved Ruste to the Agriculture portfolio. On December 12, 1968 he was also appointed Minister of Lands and Mines and served as such until May 20, 1969.

Ruste ran in the 1971 general election and won by another landslide in his district even as the Social Credit government was defeated. He served his final term in opposition and retired from the legislature at dissolution in 1975.
