= Anders Aalborg =

Canadian politician (1914–2000)

Anders Olav Aalborg

Member of the Legislative Assembly of Alberta
- In office August 17, 1948 – August 30, 1971
- Preceded by: Selmer Berg
- Succeeded by: District abolished
- Constituency: Alexandra

Minister of Education
- In office September 9, 1952 – July 31, 1964
- Premier: Ernest Manning
- Preceded by: Ivan Casey
- Succeeded by: Randolph McKinnon

Provincial Treasurer
- In office July 29, 1964 – September 10, 1971
- Premier: Ernest Manning and Harry Strom
- Preceded by: Edgar Hinman
- Succeeded by: Gordon Miniely

Minister of Railways and Telephones
- In office July 13, 1967 – December 11, 1968
- Premier: Ernest Manning
- Preceded by: Gordon Taylor
- Succeeded by: Raymond Reierson

Personal details
- Born: August 24, 1914 Oxville, Alberta
- Died: February 13, 2000 (aged 85) Surrey, British Columbia
- Party: Social Credit
- Spouse: Catherine May Burn
- Children: John and Roberta
- Occupation: teacher and politician

Anders Olav Aalborg (August 24, 1914 – February 13, 2000) was a teacher and a politician from Alberta, Canada. He served in the Legislative Assembly of Alberta from 1948 to 1971 as a member of the Social Credit caucus, and served in the cabinets of Premier Ernest Manning and Harry Strom from 1952 to 1971.

== Early life ==
Anders Olav Aalborg was born on August 24, 1914, in Oxville, Alberta. He grew up on the family farm and attended school in the area. He took his post secondary education in Edmonton and became a teacher. He taught and served as a principal at various schools in the County of Vermilion River from 1933 to 1952, when he left teaching to assume his duties as a cabinet minister. He married Catherine May Burn in 1939 and had two children. He served as vice-president of the Alberta Teachers' Association from 1945 to 1949.

== Political career ==
Aalborg first ran for office in the 1945 federal election, as the Social Credit candidate in the riding of The Battlefords; he finished last in a field of four candidates.

In 1948 he ran successfully for the Alberta Legislature in the riding of Alexandra. He ran for re-election in the 1952 Alberta general election and held his seat easily winning the two-way race.

After the election Premier Ernest Manning appointed Aalborg to the Executive Council of Alberta as Minister of Education on September 9, 1952. He ran for a third term in office with ministerial advantage in the 1955 Alberta general election. He won the four-way race with a large majority to return to office.

Aalborg ran for a fourth term in the 1959 Alberta general election. He slightly increased his popular vote over the last election easily defeating two other candidates to return to office.

Alborg ran for a fifth term in the 1963 Alberta general election. He won the largest popular vote of his political career to easily hold his seat.

After the election on July 30, 1964, Premier Manning shuffled his cabinet. He gave Aalborg the prestigious Provincial Treasurer position. He ran for his sixth term in the 1967 Alberta general election and won the four-way race with another large majority.

Premier Manning gave Aalborg the Railways and Telephones portfolio in addition to his Provincial Treasurer portfolio on July 13, 1967. He lost that portfolio a year later when Harry Strom became Premier on December 11, 1968. Aalborg had initially been reckoned as Manning's natural successor when Manning announced his retirement earlier in the year, but did not offer himself as a candidate due to poor health.

Aalborg retired from the legislature at dissolution in 1971.

== Late life ==
Aalborg died on February 13, 2000 in Surrey, British Columbia.
