= Robert Wagner Dowling =

Canadian politician (1924–2019)

Member of the Legislative Assembly of Alberta
- In office 1969–1979
- Preceded by: William Switzer
- Succeeded by: Ian Reid
- Constituency: Edson

Minister without portfolio responsible for Tourism
- In office September 10, 1971 – 1974
- Preceded by: Raymond Ratzlaff

Minister of Consumer Affairs
- In office 1974 – March 1975
- Succeeded by: Graham Harle

Minister of Business Development and Tourism
- In office March 1975 – March 1979
- Succeeded by: Al Adair

Personal details
- Born: September 28, 1924 Camrose, Alberta
- Died: March 4, 2019 (aged 94) Jasper, Alberta
- Party: Progressive Conservative
- Spouse: Olga Louise Yewchin
- Occupation: pharmacist, politician

Military service
- Allegiance: Canada
- Branch/service: Royal Canadian Air Force
- Years of service: 1942 - 1945

Robert Wagner Dowling (September 28, 1924 – March 4, 2019) was a provincial-level politician from Alberta, Canada. He served as a member of the Legislative Assembly of Alberta from 1969 to 1979 sitting as a member of the Progressive Conservative caucus. During his time in office he served a few different Cabinet portfolios in the government of Premier Peter Lougheed.

== Early life ==
Robert Wagner Dowling was born in Camrose, Alberta on September 28, 1924. He was the son of Harold James Dowling and Emma Maude Wagner, and was educated in Camrose, at the University of British Columbia and at the University of Alberta. In 1952, he married Olga Louise Yewchin. Dowling served in the Royal Canadian Air Force from 1942 to 1945. Before entering politics, he was a pharmacist and owned three drug stores and a patent medicine store.

== Political career ==
Dowling ran for a seat to the Alberta Legislature in a by-election held on October 28, 1969 in the electoral district of Edson. He won a hotly contested race defeating three other candidates including NDP leader Grant Notley to pick up the electoral district of the Progressive Conservative party who formed the official opposition at the time.

Dowling ran for a second term in office a couple years later in the 1971 Alberta general election, which saw the Progressive Conservatives come to power. He substantially increased his majority and was easily re-elected defeating two other candidates. After the election, new Premier Peter Lougheed appointed Dowling to his first cabinet as a Minister without portfolio responsible for Tourism. He was shuffled to another portfolio in the middle of his term and became the Minister of Consumer Affairs.

Dowling ran for a third term in the 1975 Alberta general election, his first time standing for re-election with ministerial advantage. His popular vote dropped slightly, but he was re-elected easily as the opposition vote collapsed.

After the election he was shuffled to a similar cabinet post as the first one he served. He became the Minister of Business Development and Tourism. He held that portfolio until he retired from provincial politics at dissolution of the assembly in 1979.

In 2000 Dowling was awarded the Alberta Centennial Medal. Dowling died in March 2019 at the age of 94.
