= James Douglas Henderson =

Canadian politician (1927–2020)

Leader of the Official Opposition in Alberta
- In office February 15, 1973 – August 21, 1973
- Preceded by: Harry Strom
- Succeeded by: Robert Curtis Clark

Member of the Legislative Assembly of Alberta
- In office June 17, 1963 – August 30, 1971
- Preceded by: Ronald Ansley
- Constituency: Leduc
- In office August 30, 1971 – March 25, 1975
- Succeeded by: Dallas Schmidt
- Constituency: Wetaskiwin-Leduc

Minister of Health
- In office May 20, 1969 – September 10, 1971
- Premier: Harry Strom
- Preceded by: J. Donovan Ross
- Succeeded by: Neil Crawford

Minister of the Environment
- In office April 1, 1971 – September 10, 1971
- Premier: Harry Strom
- Succeeded by: William Yurko

Personal details
- Born: January 2, 1927 Okotoks, Alberta, Canada
- Died: June 29, 2020 (aged 93) Kelowna, British Columbia, Canada
- Party: Social Credit; Independent
- Occupation: politician

James Douglas Henderson (January 2, 1927 – June 29, 2020) was a politician from Alberta, Canada. He served in the Legislative Assembly of Alberta from 1963 to 1975, first as a member of the Social Credit Party and later as an independent. He served as a cabinet minister in the government of Harry Strom from 1969 to 1971.

== Political career ==
Henderson was born in Okotoks, Alberta. He first ran for a seat to the Alberta Legislature in the 1963 general election as the Social Credit candidate in the electoral district of Leduc. He defeated five other candidates, including incumbent Ronald Ansley, an independent Social Crediter, and Edmonton councillor Ron Hayter, a Liberal.

In the 1967 general election Henderson defeated three other candidates by a larger margin of victory than in 1963.

Henderson was appointed a Commissioner of Oaths on October 24, 1967. He was appointed Minister of Health and Minister of the Environment by Premier Harry Strom.

In 1971, redistribution resulted in the abolition of the electoral district of Leduc, and Henderson ran in the new electoral district of Wetaskiwin-Leduc in the election held that year. Henderson won the seat by a narrow margin over Progressive Conservative candidate Emanuel Pyrc. The Social Credit government was defeated, and Henderson and the remaining Social Credit MLAs moved to the Opposition benches. Strom resigned from the party's leadership in 1972, and Henderson was named interim leader of the party and thus became Leader of the Opposition.

Werner Schmidt became party leader in 1973 but did not have a seat in the legislature, so Henderson continued as parliamentary leader and Leader of the Opposition for most of the year. However, he quit the party in September and sat as an independent. He retired at dissolution of the assembly in 1975.
