= Gordon Miniely =

Canadian politician

The Honourable Gordon Miniely ECA

MLA for Edmonton-Centre
- In office 1971–1979
- Preceded by: Ambrose Holowach
- Succeeded by: Mary LeMessurier

Personal details
- Born: October 25, 1939 (age 86) Bonnyville, Alberta
- Party: Progressive Conservative Association of Alberta

Gordon T. Miniely ECA (born October 25, 1939) was a politician from Alberta, Canada.

Miniely was elected to represent the electoral district of Edmonton-Centre for the Progressive Conservatives in the 1971 Alberta general election. He served two terms the assembly before retiring in 1979.

Miniely served in the cabinet under Premier Peter Lougheed. His portfolios were Provincial Treasurer and Minister of hospitals and medical care.
