= Raymond Reierson =

Canadian politician (1919–2020)

Member of the Legislative Assembly of Alberta
- In office August 5, 1952 – August 30, 1971
- Preceded by: Joseph Beaudry
- Succeeded by: Mick Fluker
- Constituency: St. Paul

Personal details
- Born: October 7, 1919 Edberg, Alberta, Canada
- Died: January 30, 2020 (aged 100) Edmonton, Alberta, Canada
- Party: Social Credit
- Spouse: Joyce E. Stewart (m. 1949)
- Occupation: politician

Raymond Reierson (October 7, 1919 – January 30, 2020) was a politician from Alberta, Canada. He served in the Legislative Assembly of Alberta from 1952 to 1971 as a member of the Social Credit caucus in government. Reierson held numerous portfolios in the governments of Premier Ernest Manning and Harry Strom from 1955 to 1971. He was born in Edberg in 1919, the son of Reier and Bertha C. (née Sorensen) Reierson.

== Political career ==
Reierson first ran for the Alberta Legislature as the Social Credit candidate in the electoral district of St. Paul in the 1952 general election. He narrowly defeated Liberal candidate Laval Fortier to hold the seat for his party.

In the 1955 general election Reierson defeated Liberal candidate J.R. Sweeney with over half the popular vote.

On August 2, 1955, Premier Ernest Manning appointed Reierson Minister of Industries and Labour. He was re-elected in the 1959 Alberta election with a very solid majority.

On September 1, 1959, Premier Manning changed Reierson's portfolio to Labour. He was re-elected in the 1963 general election with over half the popular vote in his district.

Reierson was re-elected in the 1967 general election in a race against three other candidates.

After the election Premier Manning gave Reierson a second portfolio, the Minister of Education, in addition to the Labour portfolio. A year later Reierson entered the 1968 leadership contest. He finished third on the first ballot and withdrew from the race.

On December 12, 1968, Harry Strom, the new premier, retained Reierson in the Labour portfolio and added the Telephones portfolio to Reierson's responsibilities.

In 1970, as Minister of Telephones, Reierson lobbied the Canadian Radio-television and Telecommunications Commission to give Alberta Government Telephones exclusive control of distributing television content from the United States. He believed his plan would lower subscriber costs from $6 a month at the time to $1 a month and allow the best content from the three US networks in operation at the time. This was in response to new CRTC rules that only allowed cable providers to carry one US Commercial station.

Reierson was defeated in the 1971 general election by Progressive Conservative candidate Mick Fluker.

== Later life and death ==
In 2006 Reierson, Nick Dushenski and Arthur Dixon visited the Alberta Legislature as its most senior former members during its centennial celebration. He turned 100 in 2019 and died in January 2020.
