= Joseph Donovan Ross =

Canadian politician

J. Donovan Ross

Member of the Legislative Assembly of Alberta
- In office August 5, 1952 – August 29, 1971

Minister of Health
- In office September 18, 1957 – May 19, 1969
- Preceded by: Wallace Warren Cross
- Succeeded by: James Douglas Henderson

Minister of Lands and Forests
- In office May 20, 1969 – September 9, 1971
- Preceded by: Henry Ruste
- Succeeded by: Allan Warrack

Personal details
- Born: Joseph Donovan Ross; March 13, 1911 Fallis, Alberta
- Died: May 22, 1984 (aged 73)
- Party: Social Credit
- Children: nine
- Education: University of Alberta; University of Toronto; McGill University
- Occupation: physician

Dr. Joseph Donovan Ross (March 13, 1911 – May 22, 1984) was a medical doctor and politician from Alberta, Canada. He served in the Legislative Assembly of Alberta from 1952 to 1971. He also served as Minister of Health in the Alberta provincial government. He was known by the name Dr. J. Donovan Ross.

== Political career ==
Ross first ran for public office as a Social Credit candidate in the 1952 Alberta general election in the multi-member district of Edmonton. He finished fifth out of twenty-nine candidates in the first round of the single transferable vote. In the second round, he finished in a four-way tie for first place to take one of the seven seats. In the 1955 general election, he finished eleventh out of thirty candidates in the first round. In the second round, he finished fifth out of seventh place to win his second term.

The Single Transferable Vote system was abolished and the Edmonton electoral district was broken up into nine single-member districts prior to the 1959 general election. Ross ran in Strathcona Centre and won with more than half of the popular vote over three other candidates. In the 1963 general election, he won the highest percentage of popular vote during his political career, defeating two other candidates and winning the district with almost 60 percent of the district vote. In the 1967 general election, he won a four-way race with just over 40% of the popular vote; the other three candidates all finished with strong showings in the race. Strathcona Centre was abolished due to redistribution before the 1971 general election, and Ross ran in the new electoral district of Edmonton-Strathcona. He was defeated by Progressive Conservative candidate Julian Koziak.

Ross served as Minister of Health for ten years in the Ernest Manning government. He was the father of Val Meredith, a former Member of Parliament from British Columbia from 1993 to 2004.

Legislative Assembly of Alberta
Preceded by Lou Heard; Clayton Adams	Member of the Legislative Assembly for Edmonton; 1952–1959	District abolished
New district	Member of the Legislative Assembly for Strathcona Centre; 1959–1971	District abolished
