= Gordon Taylor (politician) =

Canadian politician (1910–2003)

Member of Parliament for Bow River
- In office 22 May 1979 – 20 November 1988
- Preceded by: Riding re-created
- Succeeded by: Riding dissolved

Member of the Legislative Assembly of Alberta
- In office 21 March 1940 – 14 February 1979
- Preceded by: Herbert Ingrey
- Succeeded by: Lewis Clark
- Constituency: Drumheller (1940–63, 71–79); Drumheller-Gleichen (1963–1971)

Personal details
- Born: Gordon Edward Taylor; 20 July 1910 Calgary, Alberta, Canada
- Died: 26 July 2003 (aged 93) Drumheller, Alberta, Canada
- Party: Progressive Conservative (1979-2003); Social Credit (provincial, 1940-1975); Independent (provincial, 1975-1979)

Gordon Edward Taylor (20 July 1910 – 26 July 2003) was a Canadian politician, businessman and teacher from Drumheller, Alberta. He represented the Drumheller area for 48 years at both the provincial and federal levels, and never lost an election. Taylor was born in Calgary.

== Provincial political career ==
Taylor was first elected to the Legislative Assembly of Alberta in the 1940 provincial election representing Drumheller for Social Credit Party and continued to sit in the legislature for 39 years. He survived the 1971 defeat of the Social Credit government and remained in the legislature until 1979, making him the last parliamentary survivor of the Aberhart government. Taylor was Social Credit's whip from 1943 to 1950. From 1951 to 1971, he served as Minister of Highways in the governments of Ernest Manning and Harry Strom. During his tenure, 8,401 kilometers of highways were paved, and Highway 2 between Calgary and Edmonton was planned. He was also minister of telephones from 1950 to 1959. While a Member of the Legislative Assembly (MLA) during World War II, he also served with the Royal Canadian Air Force.

Taylor ran twice for the party leadership, coming in second to Strom in the 1968 leadership election to replace Manning and coming in third in the 1973 leadership race.

As an opposition MLA in the 1970s, Taylor broke with Social Credit over his support for the Peter Lougheed government's plan to provide gasoline to farmers, a measure the Social Credit party opposed. Taylor also felt the Social Credit caucus was "moving to the left" and was supporting the federal Liberals. As a result, in 1975, Taylor left the Social Credit caucus and sat as an Independent Social Credit MLA supporting Lougheed. He was re-elected as such in the 1975 provincial election, which saw Lougheed's Progressive Conservatives win 69 seats out of 75, reducing the opposition to only five MLAs (his four former Socred colleagues and one NDP) in total. He continued to support the Lougheed government during his last term in the legislature, planned to cross the floor to join the Tories on the last day before the legislature was dissolved in 1979, and then run for reelection as a Tory in the 1979 provincial election.

From 1971 onward, Taylor was the Father of the House as its longest-serving member.

== Federal political career ==
Early in 1979, Taylor was approached to run for the House of Commons of Canada as a Progressive Conservative candidate in the 1979 federal election in Bow River, which included Drumheller. He challenged incumbent Tory MP Stanley Schumacher for the PC nomination—the real contest in this strongly conservative riding. Schumacher had refused to step aside for party leader Joe Clark, whose riding was being merged with Schumacher's as a result of redistribution. After Clark decided to run in another riding, Taylor defeated Schumacher for the party nomination, and then in the federal election when Schumacher stood as an independent candidate. Taylor remained in parliament until he retired at the 1988 federal election.

Taylor became known for hosting an annual hockey game between the Members of Parliament and the House of Commons Pages.

Legislative Assembly of Alberta
Preceded by Herbert Ingrey	MLA Drumheller; 1940–1963	Succeeded by Lewis Clark
Preceded by Herbert Ingrey	MLA Drumheller-Gleichen; 1963–1971	Succeeded by Lewis Clark
Preceded by Herbert Ingrey	MLA Drumheller; 1971–1979	Succeeded by Lewis Clark
Parliament of Canada
Preceded by Eldon Woolliams	Member of Parliament Bow River; 1979–1988	District abolished
