= Alfred Hooke =

Canadian politician (1905–1992)

Alfred John Hooke
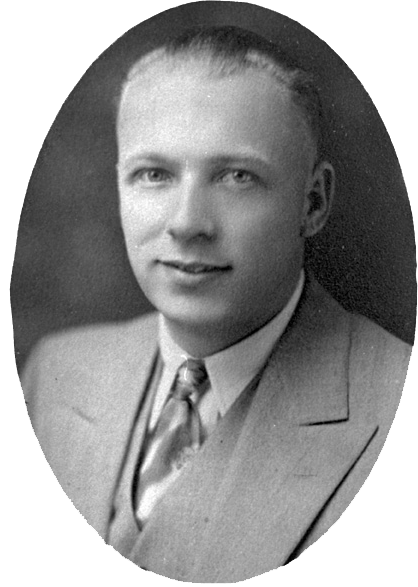

Member of the Legislative Assembly of Alberta
- In office August 22, 1935 – March 21, 1940
- Preceded by: William Payne
- Succeeded by: Alfred Speakman
- Constituency: Red Deer
- In office March 21, 1940 – August 30, 1971
- Preceded by: New District
- Succeeded by: Helen Hunley
- Constituency: Rocky Mountain House

Personal details
- Born: February 25, 1905 Whitecroft, Gloucestershire, United Kingdom
- Died: February 17, 1992 (aged 86) Sherwood Park, Alberta
- Occupation: politician, teacher and author

Alfred John "Alf" Hooke (February 25, 1905 – February 17, 1992) was a teacher, politician and writer from Alberta, Canada. He served in the Legislative Assembly of Alberta from 1935 to 1971 as a member of the Social Credit Party. He held numerous cabinet portfolios in the government of Ernest Manning from 1943 to 1968. Of the original 1935 Socred caucus, Hooke was the only member to serve continuously in the legislature from the Social Credit Party's rise to power in 1935 until the government's defeat in 1971.

== Early life ==
Alfred John Hooke was born on February 25, 1905, in Whitecroft, Gloucestershire, United Kingdom. His family moved to the province of Alberta in Canada in 1913. At the age of 13 Hooke left school and joined the work force as a hired hand. He returned to school and completed his studies three years later. He became a teacher in 1926 and remained one until his election to the Alberta legislature in 1935.

== Political career ==
Hooke joined the Social Credit movement at its beginning; he was familiar with William Aberhart through his work as a school teacher and became involved with Aberhart as a speaker on Social Credit theory.

Although reluctant at first, he was urged by people in the town of Rocky Mountain House to put his name up for the Social Credit nomination in the Red Deer electoral district. He faced nine other candidates for the nomination and headed the polls on the first ballot, upon which six were eliminated. The other four names went to the Social Credit advisory committee, which chose him to run in the 1935 Alberta general election. Hooke defeated incumbent MLA William Payne and three other candidates with a large majority.

Redistribution in 1940 created a separate electoral district for Rocky Mountain House (electoral district). Hooke ran there in the election held that year and won a clear majority on the first ballot, defeating two other candidates.

Premier Ernest Manning appointed Hooke to cabinet as Provincial Secretary on June 1, 1943. Hooke "came even closer than Manning in negating the differences among democratic socialism, communism, and the socialism of national socialism. Durning the Throne debate in February 1944, Hooke said: "I wonder if this is what our boys are fighting for? They are being told today by many spokesmen in Canada that socialism is the answer to their problems. If this is true, Mr Speaker, why send them to Europe to fight against it? Why don't we tell them that international finance, their worst enemy, is backing the philosophy of socialism.""

Hooke ran for a third term in the 1944 general election and won by a landslide. Hooke briefly held two cabinet portfolios when Manning appointed him Minister of Economic Affairs on April 20, 1945. He ran for a fourth term in the 1948 Alberta general election and was returned to office with another large victory. After the election Manning gave the post of Provincial Secretary to Clarence Gerhart while Hooke kept the Economic Affairs portfolio.

Hooke ran for a fifth term and won easily in the 1952 Alberta general election. After the election Hooke became Minister of Public Works.

Hooke stood for his sixth term in the 1955 Alberta general election. He defeated two other candidates with a solid majority to return to office. Manning re-appointed Hooke Provincial Secretary and also made him Minister of Municipal Affairs.

The 1959 Alberta general election saw Hooke win his seventh term easily. He kept the Municipal Affairs portfolio while the position of Provincial Secretary was assigned to Allen Patrick.

Hooke ran for his eighth term in the 1963 Alberta general election. He was returned with another massive majority.

In 1966 NDP MLA Garth Turcott and NDP leader Neil Reimer leveled accusations of corruption and misusing public office for personal gain against Edgar Hinman and Hooke. The unproven accusations attracted wide attention, and the Royal Canadian Mounted Police were called in to ensure the safety of Hooke and his family.

Hooke ran for re-election to his ninth term in the 1967 Alberta general election. Pundits at the time predicted Hooke had little chance at re-election. He faced two other candidates in the race, including Independent William Sinclair, who had been picked by federal Social Credit leader Robert Thompson to run. Hooke won with a majority of 54 percent of the vote.

Manning returned Hooke to cabinet as Minister of Public Welfare to bring the department under control as it became the highest spending department. He held that portfolio for a year, after which he was appointed Minister of Lands and Forests on July 16, 1968.

Hooke ran for leadership of the Social Credit party in the 1968 leadership race; he finished last on the first ballot. Harry Strom, the new leader and the new premier, dropped Hooke from the cabinet. Hooke retired from provincial politics at dissolution of the legislature in 1971. He was the only one of the original 1935 caucus to serve continuously until the Social Credit government was defeated. The closest to him were Manning himself, who resigned as premier and MLA in 1968, and William Tomyn who, though a member of the 1935 intake and stood down in 1971, had been defeated in 1952 and did not return until 1959.

== Late life ==
After leaving office in 1971 Hooke wrote the book 30+5 I Know, I was There about his early life and his political career. In 1980 Hooke wrote "Looking Backward to Go Forward about economic activity in the 1930s and how the downfall of the economy is repeating itself in modern times. He died in 1992 from cancer at the age of 86.
