= Ernest Manning =

Former Canadian senator and Premier of Alberta from 1943 to 1968

The Honourable Ernest Manning PC CC AOE
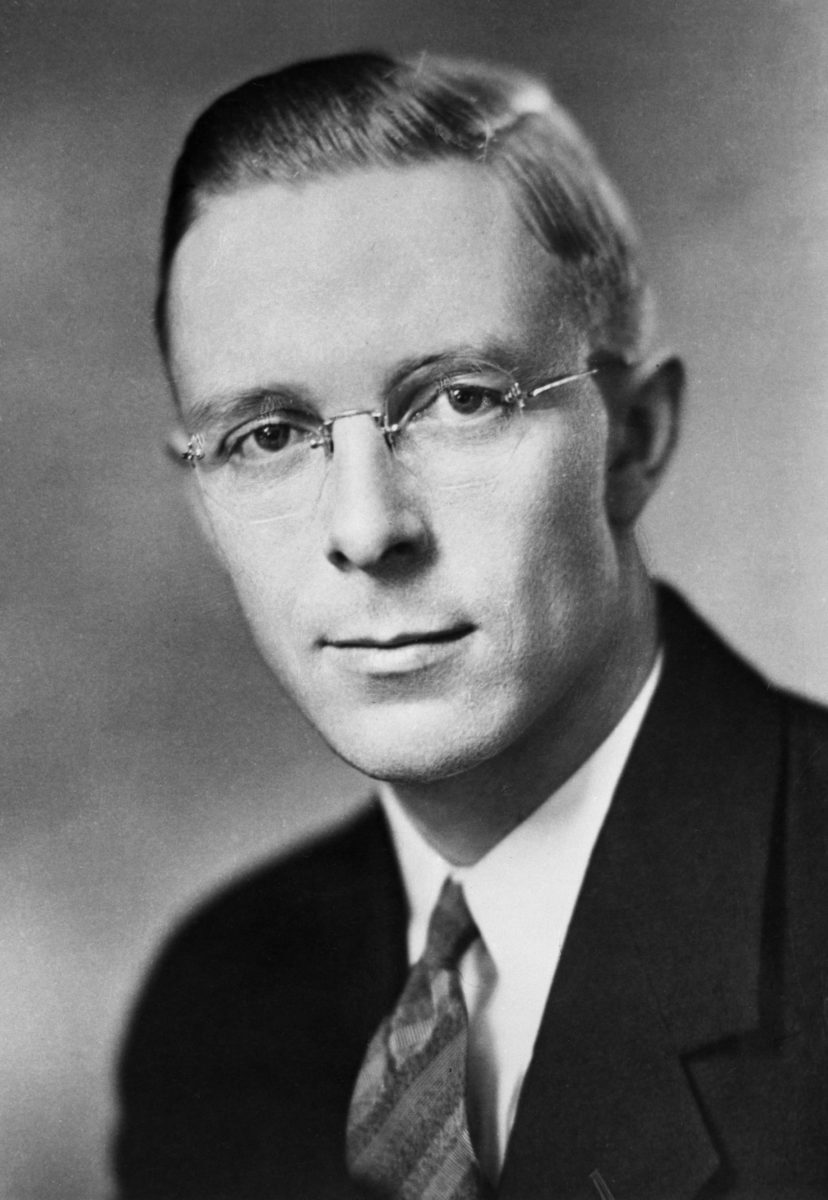
- Manning in 1943

8th Premier of Alberta
- In office May 31, 1943 – December 12, 1968
- Monarchs: George VI; Elizabeth II
- Lieutenant Governor: John C. Bowen; John J. Bowlen; John Percy Page; Grant MacEwan
- Preceded by: William Aberhart
- Succeeded by: Harry E. Strom

Canadian Senator from Alberta
- In office October 7, 1970 – September 20, 1983
- Nominated by: Pierre Trudeau
- Appointed by: Roland Michener

Member of the Legislative Assembly of Alberta
- In office June 18, 1959 – December 11, 1968
- Preceded by: District established
- Succeeded by: William Yurko
- Constituency: Strathcona East
- In office March 21, 1940 – June 18, 1959
- Preceded by: David B. Mullen, S.A.G. Barnes, William Howson
- Succeeded by: District abolished
- Constituency: Edmonton
- In office November 4, 1935 – March 21, 1940
- Preceded by: William Ross; Hugh Farthing; Norman Hindsley
- Succeeded by: Andrew Davison; William Aberhart; James Mahaffey
- Constituency: Calgary

Personal details
- Born: Ernest Charles Manning; September 20, 1908 Carnduff, Saskatchewan, Canada
- Died: February 19, 1996 (aged 87) Calgary, Alberta, Canada
- Party: Social Credit Party of Canada (federal); Social Credit Party of Alberta (provincial)
- Spouse: Muriel Aileen Preston (m. 1936)
- Children: 2, including Preston

Military service
- Allegiance: Canada
- Branch/service: Canadian Militia
- Years of service: 1939–1943
- Rank: Captain
- Unit: Edmonton Regiment
- Battles/wars: World War II

Ernest Charles Manning PC CC AOE (September 20, 1908 – February 19, 1996) was a Canadian politician and the eighth premier of Alberta between 1943 and 1968 for the Social Credit Party of Alberta. He served for 25 years, longer than any other premier in the province's history and the second longest-serving provincial premier in Canadian history (after George Henry Murray of Nova Scotia).

Manning's years as premier were defined by strong social conservatism and fiscal conservatism. He was also the only member of the Social Credit Party of Canada to sit in the Senate and, with the party shut out of the House of Commons in 1980, was its last representative in Parliament when he retired from the Senate in 1983.

Manning's son, Preston Manning, was the founder and leader of the Reform Party of Canada who served as the federal leader of the Official Opposition from 1997 to 2000.

== Early life and career ==
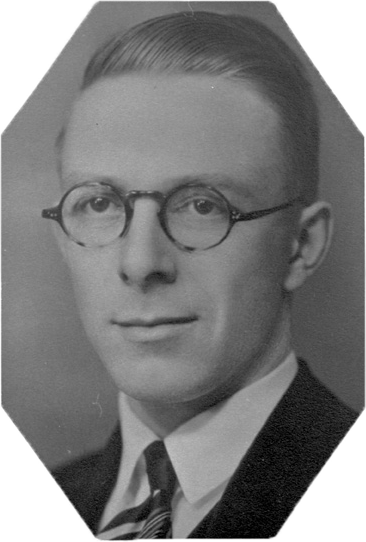
Ernest C. Manning, 1935

Manning was born in Carnduff, Saskatchewan, in 1908 to George Henry Manning (1872–1956) and Elizabeth Mara Dixon (1870–1949). George had immigrated from England in 1900 and was followed by his fiancé in 1903. Their Carnduff homestead being inadequate, they moved to a new one in Rosetown, Saskatchewan, in 1909. In his childhood, Ernest was not especially religious and only occasionally attended a Methodist church in town.

Over a radio broadcast, Manning heard of William Aberhart's Calgary Prophetic Bible Institute (CPBI), which opened in 1927. He was its first graduate in April 1930,. There he met his future wife, Muriel Preston, who was the institute's pianist and later served as the National Bible Hour's musical coordinator. As a student, Manning soon caught the attention of Aberhart and became his assistant at CPBI.

"During his second and third years at the institute, Manning lived in the Aberhart home. After graduation, the Aberhart devotee became a teacher at the institute and played a role in the management of the organization's business affairs." In 1930, he began preaching on Aberhart's weekly "Back to the Bible Hour" radio program, a practice that he continued throughout his life, even after he entered politics. The broadcasts were carried on over 90 radio stations across Canada from Halifax to Vancouver and had a large listening audience.

In 1935, Manning went into the realm of provincial politics as Aberhart's right-hand man. Together, they created the Alberta Social Credit Party with the aim of bringing the benefits of social credit to Albertans, who were suffering, they said, due to the effects of poor banking policies made worse by the Great Depression.

== Early provincial political career ==
"Manning followed Aberhart into politics, becoming a key Social Credit organizer, and platform speaker before the 1935 election." In the 1935 provincial election, he was elected to the Legislative Assembly of Alberta as a Social Credit MLA from Calgary. The Socreds won an unexpected landslide victory in that election by winning 56 of the 62 seats in the Legislative Assembly. The United Farmers of Alberta, which had governed the province for fourteen years, lost every one of its seats and would never return to the legislature.

Manning was named to the provincial cabinet at just 26 years old, becoming Alberta's provincial secretary and minister of trade and industry. Manning devoted himself wholly to his work, to such an extent that his health began to suffer. He eventually developed a bout of tuberculosis in November 1936, returning to work after just three month's convalescence. At the 1940 election, he switched seats and was elected in Edmonton, which he represented for the rest of his provincial political career. In 1943, he became Socred leader and premier.

== Military career ==
At the outbreak of World War II, while sitting as an MLA, Manning joined the Edmonton Regiment of the Non-Permanent Active Militia, qualifying as a lieutenant. In 1943, he was promoted to the rank of captain. He had to discontinue his military duties when he was appointed Premier of Alberta.

== Premier of Alberta ==
"Manning's take-over of the premiership at Aberhart's sudden death in May 1943 was a foregone conclusion. He had been Aberhart's religious protege and his closest associate in cabinet. He was regarded by Aberhart, who had two daughters, almost as a son." Manning twice honoured Aberhart's 1935 promise to issue prosperity certificates to Albertans. In 1957, his government announced a $20 Alberta Oil Royalty Dividend and issued a $17 dividend the next year. The policy was widely criticized, and the next year, Manning agreed to use oil royalties on public works and social programs instead.

In 1935, Manning had famously entered the Alberta Cabinet as Provincial Secretary at only 26 years old. He was the youngest cabinet minister in all of British parliamentary history since William Pitt the Younger, who had served as the prime minister of Great Britain 152 years earlier. When he became premier at the age of 35, he was the youngest first minister since Pitt. Besides serving as premier, he also held numerous other positions including Provincial Treasurer from 1944 to 1954, Minister of Mines and Minerals from 1952 to 1962, minister of trade and industry, attorney general from 1955 to 1968, and president of the executive council.

Under Manning, Alberta became a virtual one-party province. He led Social Credit to seven consecutive election victories between 1944 and 1967, usually with more than 50% of the popular vote. His party's seat count increased when he cancelled the use of proportional representation in Edmonton and Calgary in 1956.

Only once did he face more than 10 opposition MLAs. The height of his popularity came in 1963, when the Socreds campaigned under the slogan "63 in '63", a clean sweep of the then 63-seat legislature. They fell short of that goal, but still reduced the opposition to only three MLAs (two Liberals and one running with the support of both the Liberals and Progressive Conservatives) in total. It is still the biggest majority government, in terms of percentage of seats won, in Alberta's history. Social Credit's electoral success was based in part on what was viewed as its good government of the province. Manning himself always held the view that "both God and the people had some say in how long he would be premier—and he was not about to argue with either."

However, an ominous sign came during Manning's last victory (1967), when the once-moribund Progressive Conservatives, led by Peter Lougheed won six seats, mostly in Calgary and Edmonton. More seriously, the PCs, NDP and Liberals did well enough across the province to hold Social Credit to 45 percent of the vote, a mere minority of the votes and the SC party's lowest vote share since 1940. Manning resigned as MLA on December 11, 1968, and as premier a day after that. Social Credit was knocked out of office three years later. It never came within sight of power again, losing its remaining seats in 1982; since 2017, it has no longer existed under that name.

By the time Manning left the legislature in 1968, of the sitting Social Credit MLAs, only he, Alfred Hooke and William Tomyn had been in the original 1935 caucus. Of that trio, Hooke was the only one who would serve in the legislature without interruption for Social Credit's entire run in government from 1935 to 1971. (Tomyn had been in the original SC caucus but had not been in the Legislative Assembly from 1952 to 1959.)

=== Social Credit policy ===
Under Manning, the party largely abandoned social credit theories. He had been a devoutly loyal supporter of Aberhart from the very beginning and so it is not clear why he was so willing to abandon his party's traditional ideology. One likely explanation may have been pragmatic; many of Social Credit's policy goals infringed on responsibilities reserved to the federal government under the British North America Act. Manning, however, honoured Aberhart's 1935 promise to issue a Prosperity Certificate to Albertans twice. In 1957, his government announced a $20 Alberta Oil Royalty Dividend and issued a $17 dividend the next year. The policy was widely criticized, and the next year, Manning agreed to use oil royalties on public works and social programs instead.

=== Development of oil sands ===
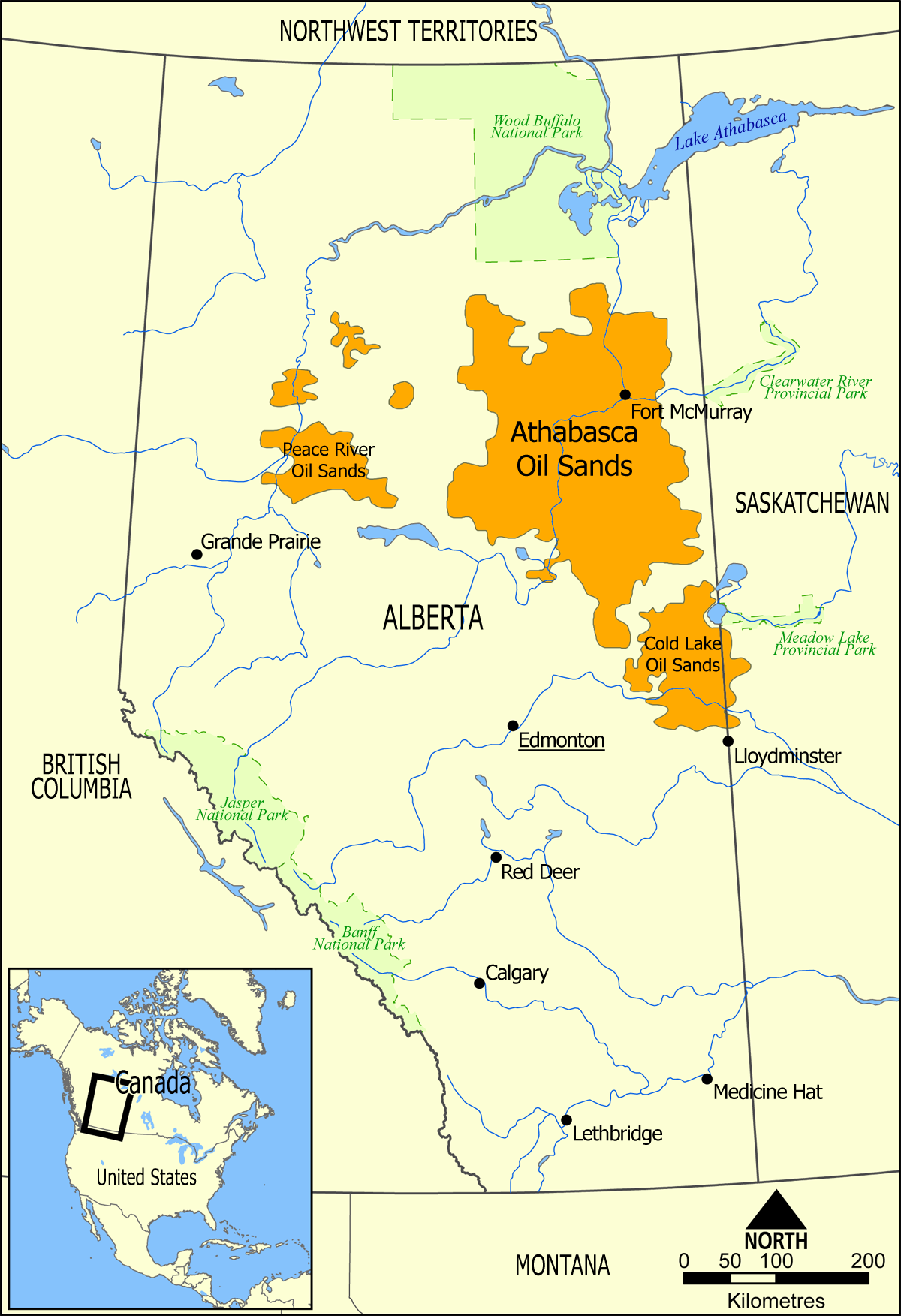
Athabasca Oil Sands.

In 1945 the Abasand plant again burned down; this time, it was not rebuilt. The huge discoveries of conventional oil at Leduc and Redwater cast even more doubt upon the development of the oil sands because of the difficulty in accessing and processing the bitumen and the numerous technical problems. Manning, however, was not dissuaded since he was convinced that the oil sands would grant the province incredible wealth. He even went so far as to convince the entire Alberta Legislature to visit the Bitumount plant in 1949 since he believed that they would agree to continue development after it had witnessed the success in separating the oil sands. Manning also commissioned a petroleum engineer by the name of Sidney Robert Blair to prepare a report on the economic feasibility of the separation process. With Pew's support, Sun Oil's majority-owned subsidiary, Great Canadian Oil Sands (GCOS), filed an application for a commercial oil sands project in Canada in 1962, the first-ever constructed.

At the opening ceremonies for the Great Canadian Oil Sands plant, Pew repeated Manning's belief of the need for the oil sands. Telling his audience, "No nation can long be secure in this atomic age unless it be amply supplied with petroleum.... It is the considered opinion of our group that if the North American continent is to produce the oil to meet its requirements in the years ahead, oil from the Athabasca area must of necessity play an important role."

=== Adoption of Alberta flag ===
The flag of Alberta adopted on June 1, 1968

Around the time of the upcoming centennial celebration of Canadian Confederation, petitions were submitted in November 1966 to Manning by the Social Credit Women's Auxiliaries of the Alberta Social Credit League to give Alberta its own unique flag. The flag was designed and approved as the official provincial flag by the Alberta legislature on June 1, 1968.

=== Social conservatism and faith ===
Manning's deep Christian faith gave him a sense of charity to the poor and needy, but unlike the longtime premier of neighbouring Saskatchewan, Tommy Douglas, Manning was an outspoken critic of government involvement in society. Manning remained a staunch anti-communist, and encouraged strong religious, individual, and corporate initiatives in addressing and solving social issues. Manning believed that the "government was there to motivate and give direction, not to intervene and carry the load."

His views on health care and social issues were heavily shaped by his elder son, Keith, who suffered from cerebral palsy. "He and his wife Muriel lovingly raised. Keith had suffered oxygen deprivation at birth." Manning improved health services in his province but opposed universal public health insurance. Alberta only signed on to the national medicare system after Manning's retirement as premier.

Mannings's faith also heavily influenced his approach to politics. He was always prudent and careful in practicing politics by "always practicing Christian-based reconciliation and conflict resolution."

=== Anticommunism ===
For the 1944 election, Manning campaigned on the labour protections that the party had implemented and used support from the Alberta Federation of Labour to fend off left-wing challenges from the socialist Co-operative Commonwealth Federation and the communist Labor-Progressive Party. Though other unions, particularly those affiliated with the Canadian Congress of Labour, took issue with the Social Credit Party's workers' protections, divisions within the unions and their leadership prevented any effective endorsement of the Co-operative Commonwealth Federation. During the campaign, Manning likened the Co-operative Commonwealth Federation to "the socialism of Germany." Saying in one "letter to a CCFer, who... had naively written to suggest CCF-Social Credit electoral co-operation: 'it's an insult to suggest to the Canadian people who are sacrificing their sons to remove the curse which the socialism of Germany has brought in the world that their own social and economical security can be attained only by introducing some form of socialism in Canada. the premise embodied in your proposed resolution, namely, that there is such a thing as democratic socialism, contradicts itself in that it attempts to associate two concepts of life which are diametrically opposed and opposite.'" He also said that socialists were trying to "enslave the ordinary people of the world, whose only real salvation lay in the issuance of Social Credit."

Manning argued the media and education system was sympathetic to the communist cause. He stated that it is "evident, in my view, in the news media, which are very heavily slanted, as a general rule favorably slanted, to socialist philosophy. This isn't by chance, it's because communism has been smart enough to see... that there are always a goodly number of men in that field who are sympathetic to the socialistic and even communistic philosophy. You even have the same thing, to varying degrees, in the field of education. It isn't by chance that you find these agitations of Marxism and so forth in many of our universities. It isn't by chance."

The Manning administration, now re-elected with a resounding majority of seats as a result of the 1944 election, devoted itself to an antisocialist crusade. In 1946, Manning's government extended censorship to included 16mm films in the hopes of "eliminating communist thought from Alberta-shown movies."

In January 1948, a coal miners' strike broke out, with thousands of miners threatening the provincial electrical grid since most electricity was generated from coal. That strike alone accounted for 30% of all of the time that was lost to strikes in Canada in 1948. In Alberta, the time lost was even worse since it was responsible for well over 99% of all of the time lost by strikes for the entire year. Manning acted swiftly to avert the crisis by rewriting the province's labour laws in March to allow the government to shut down the strike. Labour was greatly weakened by the charges of communism, and Manning's stalwart defiance of union threats caused the unions to attempt to persuade legislators, instead of protesting using strikes or violence, and halted the rise of militant unionism in Alberta.

== Federal politics ==
Manning also used his strong provincial standing to influence the federal Socreds. He told the 1961 federal leadership convention that Alberta would never accept francophone Catholic Réal Caouette of Quebec as the party's leader even though Caouette led the party's strongest branch east of Manitoba. Robert N. Thompson of Alberta won the election, but Manning's objections to Caouette led to suspicions that the vote was fixed. Indeed, Caouette later claimed that he had enough support to win, but all of the Quebec delegates voted for Thompson after Manning told him, "Tell your people to vote for Thompson because the West will never accept a Roman Catholic French Canadian leader." By then, however, all but four members of the Social Credit federal caucus came from Quebec. In 1963, virtually all of the Socred MPs from Quebec followed Caouette into the Ralliement des créditistes and left behind a Social Credit rump in English Canada.

"In 1967, Manning's book Political Realignment: A Challenge to Thoughtful Canadians was published. This book is an outline of his views regarding the reorganization of the Canadian federal party system."

== Senate and death ==
After retirement from provincial politics in 1968, Manning established his own consulting firm, Manning Consultants Limited, with his son Preston. In 1970, Ernest was appointed to the Senate, the only Socred ever to serve in that body. The same year, he was made a Companion of the Order of Canada. He retired from the Senate in 1983 since he had reached the mandatory retirement age of 75. He died in Calgary in 1996.

== Personal life ==
In 1936, Manning married Muriel Aileen Preston, the pianist at the Prophetic Bible Institute. They had two sons.

Their first son, William Keith, commonly called Keith, was born on May 2, 1939. Keith suffered from cerebral palsy. For stretches of time, he lived at a hospital in upstate New York, the Red Deer School Hospital, and a nursing home in Edmonton. He married fellow nursing home resident Marilyn Brownell, and died from cardiac arrest on June 29, 1986.

Their second son, Ernest Preston, commonly called Preston, was born on June 10, 1942. Preston went on to found the Reform Party of Canada, and was leader of the Official Opposition in parliament from 1997 to 2000.

== Legacy ==
Manning was appointed as the first member of Alberta Order of Excellence on September 23, 1981. Manning was also invested as a Companion of the Order of Canada by Governor-General Michener in 1970.

A high school and a business park road in Calgary, a freeway road in Edmonton and town in Northern Alberta are named after Ernest Manning. A person with a similar name, Ernest Callaway Manning, is the namesake of E. C. Manning Provincial Park in British Columbia.

In 1980, the Ernest C. Manning Awards Foundation was created, and the Manning Innovation Awards were started in 1982, with the purpose of promoting and honouring Canadian innovation.

== Works ==
- Manning, Ernest (1967). A white paper on human resources development. Edmonton: Government of Alberta; Alberta. Office of the Premier. OCLC 858331098.

== Bibliography ==
- Bell, Edward (2004). "Ernest Manning". In Rennie, Bradford James (ed.). Alberta premiers of the twentieth century. Regina: Canadian Plains Research Center, University of Regina. ISBN 978-0-88977-151-2.
- Brennan, Brian (2008). The Good Steward. Calgary, Alberta: Fitzhenry & Whiteside. ISBN 9781897252161.
- Byfield, Ted, ed. (2001). Leduc, Manning & the Age of Prosperity 1946–1963. Edmonton: United Western Communications. ISBN 0-9695718-9-5.
- Mackey, Lloyd (1997). Like Father, Like Son: Ernest Manning and Preston Manning. Toronto: ECW Press. ISBN 1550222996.
- Perry, Sandra E.; Craig, Jessica J. (2006). The Mantle of Leadership : Premiers of the Northwest Territories and Alberta. Edmonton, Alberta: Legislative Assembly of Alberta. ISBN 0-9689217-2-8.

Political offices
Preceded by William Ross; Hugh Farthing; Norman Hindsley	MLA Calgary #1; 1935–1940	Succeeded by Andrew Davison; William Aberhart; James Mahaffey
Preceded by William Howson	MLA Edmonton #1; 1940–1959	Succeeded by District Abolished
Preceded by New District	MLA Strathcona East; 1959–1968	Succeeded by William Yurko
