= 15th Alberta Legislature =

Canadian Legislative Assembly

- Majority parliament
- February 13, 1964 – April 14, 1967

Parliament leaders
- Premier: Ernest Charles Manning; May 31, 1943 – December 12, 1968
- Cabinet: Manning cabinet
- Leader of the Opposition: Michael Maccagno; February 13, 1964 – April 11, 1967

Party caucuses
- Government: Social Credit Party
- Opposition: Alberta Liberal Party
- Unrecognized: Coalition

Legislative Assembly
- Speaker of the Assembly: Arthur J. Dixon; March 26, 1963 – March 1, 1972
- Members: 63 MLA seats

Sovereign
- Monarch: Elizabeth II; February 6, 1952 – September 8, 2022
- Lieutenant Governor: Hon. John Percy Page; December 19, 1959 – January 6, 1966
- Hon. Grant MacEwan; January 26, 1966 – July 2, 1974

Sessions
- 1st session February 13, 1964 – April 15, 1964
- 2nd session February 18, 1965 – April 12, 195
- 3rd session February 17, 1966 – April 18, 1966
- 4th session November 16, 1966 – November 17, 1966
- 5th session February 9, 1967 – April 11, 1967
← 14th	→ 16th

The 15th Alberta Legislative Assembly was in session from February 13, 1964, to April 14, 1967, with the membership of the assembly determined by the results of the 1963 Alberta general election held on June 17, 1963. The Legislature officially resumed on February 13, 1964, and continued until the fifth session was prorogued on April 11, 1967, and dissolved on April 14, 1967, prior to the 1967 Alberta general election.

Alberta's fifteenth government was controlled by the majority Social Credit Party for the eighth time, led by Premier Ernest Manning who would go on to be the longest serving Premier in Alberta history. The Official Opposition was led by Michael Maccagno of the Alberta Liberal Party who were elected to two seats in the Legislature. The Speaker was Arthur J. Dixon, who would remain the speaker until the fall of the Social Credit government after the 1971 Alberta general election. The Liberals held opposition status with just two seats, and the Coalition party held third place in the Legislature.

== Standings changes since the 15th general election ==
Number of members per party by date	1963		1964	1965		1966		1967
Number of members per party by date	Jun 17	Nov 22	Jan 20	Feb 2	Mar 29	Aug 4	Oct 6	Apr 24
Social Credit	60	59	60	59		58		57
Liberal	2				3			
Coalition	1							
New Democratic	0						1	
Independent Social Credit	0							1
Total members	63	62	63	62	63	62	63	
Vacant	0	1	0	1	0	1	0	
Government Majority	57	56	57	56	55	54	53	51

Membership changes in the 15th Assembly
Date	Member Name	District	Party	Reason
November 22, 1963	Petrie Meston	Three Hills	Social Credit	Died
January 20, 1964	Roy Davidson	Three Hills	Social Credit	Elected in a by-election.
February 2, 1965	Norman Willmore	Edson	Social Credit	Died in a traffic accident
March 29, 1965	William Switzer	Edson	Liberal	Elected in a by-election.
August 4, 1966	William Kovach	Pincher Creek-Crowsnest	Social Credit	Died from a heart seizure.
October 6, 1966	Garth Turcott	Pincher Creek-Crowsnest	NDP	Elected in a by-election.
Standings changes after dissolution on April 14, 1967
April 24, 1967	Cornelia Wood	Stony Plain	Independent Social Credit	Lost nomination on February 11, Left to run as Independent.

== Members elected ==
For complete electoral history, see individual districts.

15th Alberta Legislative Assembly
District	Member	Party	First elected/ previously elected	No.# of term(s)
Alexandra	Anders Aalborg	Social Credit	1948	5th term
Athabasca	Antonio Aloisio	Social Credit	1952, 1959	3rd term*
Banff-Cochrane	Frank Gainer	Coalition	1955	3rd term
Bonnyville	Romeo Lamothe	Social Credit	1961	2nd term
Bow Valley-Empress	William Delday	Social Credit	1959	2nd term
Calgary Bowness	Charles Johnston	Social Credit	1959	2nd term
Calgary Centre	Frederick C. Colborne	Social Credit	1945	5th term
Calgary East	Albert Ludwig	Social Credit	1959	2nd term
Calgary Glenmore	Bill Dickie	Liberal	1963	1st term
Calgary North	Robert Simpson	Social Credit	1963	1st term
Calgary Queens Park	Lee Leavitt	Social Credit	1952, (Note: Banff-Cochrane) 1963	2nd term*
Calgary South	Arthur J. Dixon	Social Credit	1952	4th term
Calgary West	Donald S. Fleming	Social Credit	1959	2nd term
Camrose	Chester Sayers	Social Credit	1941	7th term
Cardston	Edgar Hinman	Social Credit	1952	4th term
Clover Bar	Floyd Baker	Social Credit	1935	8th term
Cypress	Harry Strom	Social Credit	1955	3rd term
Drumheller-Gleichen	Gordon Taylor	Social Credit	1940	7th term
Dunvegan	Ernest Lee	Social Credit	1963	1st term
Edmonton Centre	Ambrose Holowach	Social Credit	1959	2nd term
Edmonton Jasper Place	John Horan	Social Credit	1963	1st term
Edmonton North	Ethel Wilson	Social Credit	1959	2nd term
Edmonton North East	Lou Heard	Social Credit	1948, 1959	3rd term*
Edmonton North West	Edgar Gerhart	Social Credit	1952	4th term
Edmonton Norwood	William Tomyn	Social Credit	1935, (Note: Willingdon) 1959	6th term*
Edmonton West	Stanley Geldart	Social Credit	1963	1st term
Edson	Norman Willmore	Social Credit	1944	6th term
Edson	William Switzer (1965)	Liberal	1965	1st term
Grande Prairie	Ira McLaughlin	Social Credit	1944	6th term
Grouard	Roy Ells	Social Credit	1959	2nd term
Hand Hills-Acadia	Clinton French	Social Credit	1959	2nd term
Lac La Biche	Michael Maccagno	Liberal	1955	3rd term
Lac Ste. Anne	William Patterson	Social Credit	1959	2nd term
Lacombe	Allen Patrick	Social Credit	1952	4th term
Leduc	James Henderson	Social Credit	1963	1st term
Lethbridge	John Landeryou	Social Credit	1944	6th term
Little Bow	Raymond Speaker	Social Credit	1963	1st term
Macleod	James Hartley	Social Credit	1935	8th term
Medicine Hat	Harry Leinweber	Social Credit	1961	2nd term
Okotoks-High River	Edward Benoit	Social Credit	1963	1st term
Olds-Didsbury	Robert Curtis Clark	Social Credit	1960	2nd term
Peace River	Euell Montgomery	Social Credit	1961	2nd term
Pembina	Robin Jorgenson	Social Credit	1944	6th term
Pincher Creek-Crowsnest	William Kovach	Social Credit	1948	5th term
Pincher Creek-Crowsnest	Garth Turcott (1966)	NDP	1966	1st term
Ponoka	Glen Johnston	Social Credit	1952	4th term
Red Deer	William Ure	Social Credit	1959	2nd term
Redwater	Michael Senych	Social Credit	1963	1st term
Rocky Mountain House	Alfred Hooke	Social Credit	1935	8th term
Sedgewick-Coronation	Jack Hillman	Social Credit	1952	4th term
Spirit River	Adolph Fimrite	Social Credit	1952	4th term
St. Albert	Keith Everitt	Social Credit	1959	2nd term
St. Paul	Raymond Reierson	Social Credit	1952	4th term
Stettler	Galen Norris	Social Credit	1956	3rd term
Stony Plain	Cornelia Wood	Social Credit	1940, 1959	6th term*
Stony Plain	Cornelia Wood	Independent Social Credit	1940, 1959	6th term*
Strathcona Centre	Joseph Donovan Ross	Social Credit	1952	4th term
Strathcona East	Ernest Manning	Social Credit	1935	8th term
Strathcona West	Randolph McKinnon	Social Credit	1959	2nd term
Taber-Warner	Leonard Halmrast	Social Credit	1945	6th term
Three Hills	Petrie Meston	Social Credit	1963	1st term
Three Hills	Roy Davidson (1964)	Social Credit	1964	1st term
Vegreville-Bruce	Alex Gordey	Social Credit	1959	2nd term
Vermilion	Ashley Cooper	Social Credit	1959	2nd term
Wainwright	Henry Ruste	Social Credit	1955	3rd term
Wetaskiwin	Albert Strohschein	Social Credit	1963	1st term
Willingdon-Two Hills	Nicholas Melnyk	Social Credit	1959	2nd term
