= 14th Alberta Legislature =

Canadian Legislative Assembly

- Majority parliament
- February 11, 1960 – May 9, 1963

Parliament leaders
- Premier: Ernest Charles Manning; May 31, 1943 – December 12, 1968
- Cabinet: Manning cabinet

Party caucuses
- Government: Social Credit Party
- Crossbench: Alberta Liberal Party
- Progressive Conservative Association of Alberta
- Coalition

Legislative Assembly
- Speaker of the Assembly: Peter Dawson; February 25, 1937 – March 24, 1963
- Arthur J. Dixon; March 26, 1963 – March 1, 1972
- Members: 65 MLA seats

Sovereign
- Monarch: Elizabeth II; February 6, 1952 – September 8, 2022
- Lieutenant Governor: Hon. John Percy Page; December 19, 1959 – January 6, 1966

Sessions
- 1st session February 11, 1960 – April 11, 1960
- 2nd session February 16, 1961 – April 12, 1961
- 3rd session November 28, 1961 – November 29, 1961
- 4th session February 15, 1962 – April 5, 1962
- 5th session February 14, 1963 – March 29, 1963
← 13th	→ 15th

The 14th Alberta Legislature was in session from February 11, 1960, to May 9, 1963, with the membership of the Legislative Assembly determined by the results of the 1959 Alberta general election held on June 18, 1959. The Legislature officially resumed on February 11, 1960, and continued until the fifth session was prorogued on March 29, 1963, and dissolved on May 9, prior to the 1963 Alberta general election.

Alberta's government was controlled by the majority Social Credit Party for the seventh time, led by Premier Ernest Manning who went on to be the longest-serving premier in Alberta history. There was no Official Opposition, as three parities and one independent made up the four non-government house seats at one seat apiece. The Speaker was Peter Dawson, who served until his death on March 24, 1963. Dawson was replaced as Speaker by Arthur J. Dixon, who remained the speaker until the fall of the Social Credit government after the 1971 Alberta general election. This was the first assembly elected after the Government of Alberta changed from single transferable vote to first past the post.

== Standings changes since the 14th general election ==
Number of members per party by date	1959	1960			1961					1963
Number of members per party by date	Jun 18	Sep 28	Oct 21	Nov 30	Jan 19	Sep 5	Oct 10	Oct 26	Nov 27	Mar 24
Social Credit	61	60	59	60	61	60	59	60	61	60
Liberal	1									
Progressive Conservative	1									
Coalition	1									
Independent Social Credit	1									
Total members	65	64	63	64	65	64	63	64	65	64
Vacant	0	1	2	1	0	1	2	1	0	1
Government Majority	57	56	55	56	57	56	55	56	57	56

Membership changes in the 14th Assembly
Date	Name	District	Party	Reason
June 18, 1959	See List of Members			Election day of the 14th Alberta general election
September 28, 1960	James Owens	Didsbury	Social Credit	Died from a heart attack.
October 21, 1960	Elizabeth Robinson	Medicine Hat	Social Credit	Died from an undisclosed illness in Medicine Hat hospital.
November 30, 1960	Robert Clark	Didsbury	Social Credit	Elected in a by-election
January 19, 1961	Harry Leinweber	Medicine Hat	Social Credit	Elected in a by-election
September 5, 1961	William Gilliland	Peace River	Social Credit	Died after prolonged illness related to a heart attack.
October 10, 1961	Karl Nordstrom	Bonnyville	Social Credit	Died after hospitalization for undisclosed illness.
October 26, 1961	Euell Montgomery	Peace River	Social Credit	Elected in a by-election
November 27, 1961	Romeo Lamothe	Bonnyville	Social Credit	Elected in a by-election
March 24, 1963	Peter Dawson	Little Bow	Social Credit	Died

== Members elected ==
For complete electoral history, see individual districts.

14th Alberta Legislative Assembly
District	Member	Party	First elected/ previously elected	No.# of term(s)
Acadia-Coronation	Marion Kelts	Social Credit	1959	1st term
Alexandra	Anders Aalborg	Social Credit	1948	4th term
Athabasca	Antonio Aloisio	Social Credit	1952, 1959	2nd term*
Banff-Cochrane	Frank Gainer	Coalition	1955	2nd term
Bonnyville	Karl Nordstrom	Social Credit	1959	1st term
Bonnyville	Romeo Lamothe (1961)	Social Credit	1961	1st term
Bow Valley-Empress	William Delday	Social Credit	1959	1st term
Bruce	Earl Hardy	Social Credit	1948	4th term
Calgary Bowness	Charles Johnston	Social Credit	1959	1st term
Calgary Centre	Frederick C. Colborne	Social Credit	1945	5th term
Calgary Glenmore	Ernest Watkins	Progressive Conservative	1957	2nd term
Calgary North	Rose Wilkinson	Social Credit	1944	5th term
Calgary North East	Albert Ludwig	Social Credit	1959	1st term
Calgary South East	Arthur J. Dixon	Social Credit	1952	3rd term
Calgary West	Donald S. Fleming	Social Credit	1959	1st term
Camrose	Chester Sayers	Social Credit	1941	6th term
Cardston	Edgar Hinman	Social Credit	1952	3rd term
Clover Bar	Floyd Baker	Social Credit	1935	7th term
Cypress	Harry Strom	Social Credit	1955	2nd term
Didsbury	James Lawrence Owens	Social Credit	1955	2nd term
Didsbury	Robert Clark (1961)	Social Credit	1961	1st term
Drumheller	Gordon Taylor	Social Credit	1940	6th term
Dunvegan	Joseph Scruggs	Social Credit	1959	1st term
Edmonton Centre	Ambrose Holowach	Social Credit	1959	1st term
Edmonton North	Ethel Wilson	Social Credit	1959	1st term
Edmonton Norwood	William Tomyn	Social Credit	1935, (Note: Willingdon) 1959	5th term*
Edmonton North East	Lou Heard	Social Credit	1948, 1959	2nd term*
Edmonton North West	Edgar Gerhart	Social Credit	1952	3rd term
Edson	Norman Willmore	Social Credit	1944	5th term
Gleichen	George Bell	Social Credit	1944	5th term
Grande Prairie	Ira McLaughlin	Social Credit	1944	5th term
Grouard	Roy Ells	Social Credit	1959	1st term
Hand Hills	Clinton Keith French	Social Credit	1959	1st term
Jasper West	Richard Jamieson	Social Credit	1959	1st term
Lac La Biche	Michael Maccagno	Liberal	1955	2nd term
Lac Ste. Anne	William Patterson	Social Credit	1959	1st term
Lacombe	Allen Patrick	Social Credit	1952	3rd term
Leduc	Ronald Ansley	Independent Social Credit	1935	7th term
Lethbridge	John Landeryou	Social Credit	1944	5th term
Little Bow	Peter Dawson	Social Credit	1935	7th term
Macleod	James Hartley	Social Credit	1935	7th term
Medicine Hat	Elizabeth Robinson	Social Credit	1953	3rd term
Medicine Hat	Harry Leinweber (1961)	Social Credit	1961	1st term
Okotoks-High River	Ernest George Hansell	Social Credit	1959	1st term
Olds	Roderick Macleod	Social Credit	1959	2nd term
Peace River	William Gilliland	Social Credit	1944	5th term
Peace River	Euell Montgomery (1961)	Social Credit	1961	1st term
Pembina	Robin Jorgenson	Social Credit	1944	5th term
Pincher Creek-Crowsnest	William Kovach	Social Credit	1948	4th term
Ponoka	Glen Johnston	Social Credit	1952	3rd term
Red Deer	William Ure	Social Credit	1959	1st term
Redwater	John Dubetz	Social Credit	1959	1st term
Rocky Mountain House	Alfred Hooke	Social Credit	1935	7th term
Sedgewick	Jack Hillman	Social Credit	1952	3rd term
Spirit River	Adolph Fimrite	Social Credit	1952	3rd term
St. Albert	Keith Everitt	Social Credit	1959	1st term
St. Paul	Raymond Reierson	Social Credit	1952	3rd term
Stettler	Galen Norris	Social Credit	1956	2nd term
Stony Plain	Cornelia Wood	Social Credit	1940, 1959	5th term*
Strathcona Centre	Joseph Donovan Ross	Social Credit	1952	3rd term
Strathcona East	Ernest Manning	Social Credit	1935	7th term
Strathcona West	Randolph McKinnon	Social Credit	1959	1st term
Taber	Roy Lee	Social Credit	1940	6th term
Vegreville	Alex Gordey	Social Credit	1959	1st term
Vermilion	Ashley Cooper	Social Credit	1959	1st term
Wainwright	Henry Ruste	Social Credit	1955	2nd term
Warner	Leonard Halmrast	Social Credit	1945	5th term
Wetaskiwin	John Wingblade	Social Credit	1935	7th term
Willingdon	Nicholas Melnyk	Social Credit	1959	1st term
