= Edmonton-Jasper Place =

Defunct provincial electoral district in Alberta, Canada

Alberta electoral district

Defunct provincial electoral district
- Legislature: Legislative Assembly of Alberta
- District created: 1963
- District abolished: 1992
- First contested: 1963
- Last contested: 1989

Edmonton-Jasper Place was a provincial electoral district in Alberta, Canada, mandated to return a single member to the Legislative Assembly of Alberta using the first past the post method of voting from 1963 to 1989.

== Members of the Legislative Assembly (MLAs) ==
Members of the Legislative Assembly for Edmonton-Jasper Place
Assembly	Years	Member	Party
See Edmonton electoral district from 1921-1959
15th	1963–1967	John William Horan	Social Credit
16th	1967–1971	John William Horan	Social Credit
17th	1971–1975	Leslie Gordon Young	Progressive Conservative
18th	1975–1979	Leslie Gordon Young	Progressive Conservative
19th	1979–1982	Leslie Gordon Young	Progressive Conservative
20th	1982–1986	Leslie Gordon Young	Progressive Conservative
21st	1986–1989	Leslie Gordon Young	Progressive Conservative
22nd	1989–1993	John McInnis	New Democratic

== Election results ==
=== 1963 ===
1963 Alberta general election
Party	Candidate	Votes	%	±%
Social Credit	John William Horan	3,639	45.29%	–
Liberal	Keith C. Campbell	2,234	27.80%	–
New Democratic	Patrick J. Ryan	1,128	14.04%	–
Progressive Conservative	Clarence Edgar Sage	1,034	12.87%	–
Total		8,035	–	–
Rejected, spoiled and declined		26	–	–
Eligible electors / Turnout		16,721	48.21%	–
Social Credit pickup new district.				
Source(s) Source: "Edmonton-Jasper Place Official Results 1963 Alberta general election". Alberta Heritage Community Foundation.

=== 1967 ===
1967 Alberta general election
Party	Candidate	Votes	%	±%
Social Credit	John William Horan	4,206	36.76%	-8.53%
Progressive Conservative	Gerard Joseph Amerongen	3,000	26.22%	13.35%
New Democratic	Tom Hennessey	2,210	19.31%	5.27%
Liberal	Barry Vogel	1,851	16.18%	-11.63%
Independent Social Credit	Albert V. Bourcier	176	1.54%	–
Total		11,443	–	–
Rejected, spoiled and declined		131	–	–
Eligible electors / Turnout		19,537	59.24%	11.03%
Social Credit hold		Swing		-3.47%
Source(s) Source: "Edmonton-Jasper Place Official Results 1967 Alberta general election". Alberta Heritage Community Foundation.

=== 1971 ===
1971 Alberta general election
Party	Candidate	Votes	%	±%
Progressive Conservative	Leslie Gordon Young	5,758	51.46%	25.24%
Social Credit	John B. Ludwig	3,789	33.86%	-2.90%
New Democratic	Kenneth Joseph Kerr	1,402	12.53%	-6.78%
Liberal	Edwin Robert Daniels	241	2.15%	-14.02%
Total		11,190	–	–
Rejected, spoiled and declined		45	–	–
Eligible electors / Turnout		15,794	71.13%	11.89%
Progressive Conservative gain from Social Credit		Swing		3.53%
Source(s) Source: "Edmonton-Jasper Place Official Results 1971 Alberta general election". Alberta Heritage Community Foundation.

=== 1975 ===
1975 Alberta general election
Party	Candidate	Votes	%	±%
Progressive Conservative	Leslie Gordon Young	5,436	66.67%	15.21%
New Democratic	Carol Berry	1,192	14.62%	2.09%
Social Credit	Don Eastcott	1,035	12.69%	-21.17%
Liberal	Philip Lister	491	6.02%	3.87%
Total		8,154	–	–
Rejected, spoiled and declined		80	–	–
Eligible electors / Turnout		16,399	50.21%	-20.92%
Progressive Conservative hold		Swing		17.23%
Source(s) Source: "Edmonton-Jasper Place Official Results 1975 Alberta general election". Alberta Heritage Community Foundation.

=== 1979 ===
1979 Alberta general election
Party	Candidate	Votes	%	±%
Progressive Conservative	Leslie Gordon Young	5,049	60.29%	-6.38%
New Democratic	Charlie Wood	1,735	20.72%	6.10%
Social Credit	Ralph Frank Watzke	1,037	12.38%	-0.31%
Liberal	Gerald F. Paschen	554	6.61%	0.59%
Total		8,375	–	–
Rejected, spoiled and declined		17	–	–
Eligible electors / Turnout		16,919	49.60%	-0.61%
Progressive Conservative hold		Swing		-6.24%
Source(s) Source: "Edmonton-Jasper Place Official Results 1979 Alberta general election". Alberta Heritage Community Foundation.

=== 1982 ===
1982 Alberta general election
Party	Candidate	Votes	%	±%
Progressive Conservative	Leslie Gordon Young	6,723	57.82%	-2.47%
New Democratic	Don Aitken	3,498	30.08%	9.37%
Western Canada Concept	John B. Ludwig	987	8.49%	–
Social Credit	Peter A. Keohan	241	2.07%	-10.31%
Reform	G. Crofton	179	1.54%	–
Total		11,628	–	–
Rejected, spoiled and declined		58	–	–
Eligible electors / Turnout		18,734	62.38%	12.78%
Progressive Conservative hold		Swing		-5.92%
Source(s) Source: "Edmonton-Jasper Place Official Results 1982 Alberta general election". Alberta Heritage Community Foundation.

=== 1986 ===
1986 Alberta general election
Party	Candidate	Votes	%	±%
Progressive Conservative	Leslie Gordon Young	4,357	40.09%	-17.73%
New Democratic	Vair Clendenning	4,286	39.43%	9.35%
Liberal	Karen Leibovici	1,947	17.91%	–
Representative	Michael P. Astle	157	1.44%	–
Western Canada Concept	Curtis Long	122	1.12%	-7.37%
Total		10,869	–	–
Rejected, spoiled and declined		21	–	–
Eligible electors / Turnout		25,169	43.27%	-19.11%
Progressive Conservative hold		Swing		-13.54%
Source(s) Source: "Edmonton-Jasper Place Official Results 1986 Alberta general election". Alberta Heritage Community Foundation.

=== 1989 ===
1989 Alberta general election
Party	Candidate	Votes	%	±%
New Democratic	John McInnis	4,966	34.93%	-4.50%
Liberal	Karen Leibovici	4,747	33.39%	15.48%
Progressive Conservative	Leslie Gordon Young	4,503	31.68%	-8.41%
Total		14,216	–	–
Rejected, spoiled and declined		15	–	–
Eligible electors / Turnout		26,706	53.29%	10.02%
New Democratic gain from Progressive Conservative		Swing		0.44%
Source(s) Source: "Edmonton-Jasper Place Official Results 1989 Alberta general election". Alberta Heritage Community Foundation.

== See also ==
- List of Alberta provincial electoral districts
