= Strathcona East =

Defunct provincial electoral district in Alberta, Canada

Alberta electoral district

Defunct provincial electoral district
- Legislature: Legislative Assembly of Alberta
- District created: 1959
- District abolished: 1971
- First contested: 1959
- Last contested: 1969

Strathcona East was a provincial electoral district in Alberta, Canada, mandated to return a single member to the Legislative Assembly of Alberta using the first past the post method of voting from 1959 to 1971.

== History ==
The historic 1959 redistribution of the provincial ridings of Calgary and Edmonton standardized the voting system back to First Past the Post. From 1926 to 1959 Calgary and Edmonton members were elected by Single Transferable Vote. The rest of the province had the option of how to count ballots. The redistribution created nine ridings in Edmonton. The other eight ridings were Edmonton Centre, Edmonton North, Edmonton Norwood, Edmonton North East, Edmonton North West, Strathcona West, Strathcona Centre, and Jasper West.

In 1971 the riding was split between Edmonton-Gold Bar and Edmonton-Ottewell.

=== Members of the Legislative Assembly (MLAs) ===
Members of the Legislative Assembly for Strathcona East
Assembly	Years	Member	Party
See Edmonton electoral district from 1921-1959
14th	1959–1963	Ernest C. Manning	Social Credit
15th	1963–1967	Ernest C. Manning	Social Credit
16th	1967–1969	Ernest C. Manning	Social Credit
16th	1969–1971	William Yurko	Progressive Conservative
See Edmonton-Gold Bar electoral district from 1971-present and Edmonton-Whitemud electoral district from 1971-present

== Election results ==
=== 1959 ===
1959 Alberta general election
Party	Candidate	Votes	%	±%
Social Credit	Ernest C. Manning	7,337	49.72%	–
Progressive Conservative	James E. Simpson	3,812	25.83%	–
Liberal	George Johnson	2,610	17.69%	–
Co-operative Commonwealth	Hugh Smith	999	6.77%	–
Total		14,758	–	–
Rejected, spoiled and declined		29	–	–
Eligible electors / turnout		22,953	64.42%	–
Social Credit pickup new district.				
Source(s) Source: "Strathcona-East Official Results 1959 Alberta general election". Alberta Heritage Community Foundation.

=== 1963 ===
1963 Alberta general election
Party	Candidate	Votes	%	±%
Social Credit	Ernest C. Manning	6,842	53.37%	3.66%
Progressive Conservative	Oscar H. Kruger	2,630	20.52%	-5.31%
Liberal	James A. Cox	1,890	14.74%	-2.94%
New Democratic	Dennis A. Wood	1,457	11.37%	4.60%
Total		12,819	–	–
Rejected, spoiled and declined		37	–	–
Eligible electors / turnout		24,017	53.53%	-10.89%
Social Credit hold		Swing		4.49%
Source(s) Source: "Strathcona-East Official Results 1963 Alberta general election". Alberta Heritage Community Foundation.

=== 1967 ===
1967 Alberta general election
Party	Candidate	Votes	%	±%
Social Credit	Ernest C. Manning	6,314	49.89%	-3.49%
Progressive Conservative	C. Jack Thorpe	2,976	23.51%	3.00%
New Democratic	Ray Field	1,909	15.08%	3.72%
Liberal	Percy Marshall	1,458	11.52%	-3.22%
Total		12,657	–	–
Rejected, spoiled and declined		46	–	–
Eligible electors / turnout		19,282	65.88%	12.35%
Social Credit hold		Swing		-3.24%
Source(s) Source: "Strathcona-East Official Results 1967 Alberta general election". Alberta Heritage Community Foundation.

=== 1969 by-election ===
Alberta provincial by-election, February 10, 1969 Following the resignation of Ernest C. Manning on December 11, 1968
Party	Candidate	Votes	%	±%
Progressive Conservative	William Yurko	3,782	45.65%	24.14%
Social Credit	W. Johnson	3,339	40.31%	-9.58%
Liberal	Percy Marshall	771	9.31%	-2.21%
New Democratic	G. Allen	392	4.73%	-10.35%
Total		8,284	–	–
Rejected, spoiled, and declined		–	–	–
Eligible electors / turnout		–	–	–
Progressive Conservative gain from Social Credit		Swing		+5.30
Source(s) "By-elections". Elections Alberta.

== By-election reasons ==
- February 10, 1969 — Resignation of Ernest Manning.

== See also ==
- List of Alberta provincial electoral districts
- Canadian provincial electoral districts
