= Strathcona Centre =

Defunct provincial electoral district in Alberta, Canada

Coordinates: 53.46°N 113.55°W

Alberta electoral district

Defunct provincial electoral district
- Legislature: Legislative Assembly of Alberta
- District created: 1959
- District abolished: 1971
- First contested: 1959
- Last contested: 1967

Strathcona Centre was a provincial electoral district in Alberta, Canada, mandated to return a single member to the Legislative Assembly of Alberta using the first past the post method of voting from 1959 to 1971.

== History ==
It was created in 1959 after the Edmonton district was broken up into ridings.

The historic 1959 redistribution of the provincial ridings of Calgary and Edmonton standardized the voting system back to First Past the Post. From 1926 to 1959 Calgary and Edmonton members were elected by Single Transferable Vote. The rest of the province had the option of how to count ballots. The redistribution created nine ridings in Edmonton.

The other eight ridings were Edmonton Centre, Edmonton North, Edmonton Norwood, Edmonton North East, Edmonton North West, Strathcona East, Strathcona West, and Jasper West.

In 1971 the riding was split, the west part became the north part of Edmonton-Whitemud with a small part being transferred to Edmonton-Parkallen, and the east part became Edmonton-Strathcona with the Bonnie Doon Shopping Centre transferred to Edmonton-Avonmore.

=== Members of the Legislative Assembly (MLAs) ===
Strathcona Centre
Assembly	Years	Member	Party
Riding created from Edmonton
14th	1959–1963	Joseph Donovan Ross	Social Credit
15th	1963–1967	Joseph Donovan Ross	Social Credit
16th	1967–1971	Joseph Donovan Ross	Social Credit
Riding dissolved into Edmonton-Strathcona, Edmonton-Whitemud, Edmonton-Parkallen and Edmonton-Avonmore

== Election results ==
=== 1959 ===
1959 Alberta general election
Party	Candidate	Votes	%	±%
Social Credit	Joseph Donovan Ross	4,564	54.16%	–
Progressive Conservative	Pat Walsh	2,226	26.42%	–
Liberal	Leslie M. Lyons	1,215	14.42%	–
Co-operative Commonwealth	Keith Wright	422	5.01%	–
Total		8,427	–	–
Rejected, spoiled and declined		54	–	–
Eligible electors / turnout		14,351	59.10%	–
Social Credit pickup new district.				
Source(s) Source: "Strathcona-Centre Official Results 1959 Alberta general election". Alberta Heritage Community Foundation.

=== 1963 ===
1963 Alberta general election
Party	Candidate	Votes	%	±%
Social Credit	Joseph Donovan Ross	5,232	58.71%	4.55%
Liberal	Ian Nicoll	2,418	27.13%	12.71%
New Democratic	Harry J. Strynadka	1,262	14.16%	9.15%
Total		8,912	–	–
Rejected, spoiled and declined		48	–	–
Eligible electors / turnout		17,345	51.66%	-7.44%
Social Credit hold		Swing		1.92%
Source(s) Source: "Strathcona-Centre Official Results 1963 Alberta general election". Alberta Heritage Community Foundation.

=== 1967 ===
1967 Alberta general election
Party	Candidate	Votes	%	±%
Social Credit	Joseph Donovan Ross	4,052	40.66%	-18.05%
Progressive Conservative	Larry Boddy	2,493	25.02%	–
Liberal	Ian Nicoll	1,794	18.00%	-9.13%
New Democratic	Gordon E. Weese	1,627	16.33%	2.16%
Total		9,966	–	–
Rejected, spoiled and declined		38	–	–
Eligible electors / turnout		16,750	59.73%	8.07%
Social Credit hold		Swing		-7.97%
Source(s) Source: "Strathcona-Centre Official Results 1967 Alberta general election". Alberta Heritage Community Foundation.

== See also ==
- List of Alberta provincial electoral districts
- Canadian provincial electoral districts
