= 1967 Alberta general election =

- May 23, 1967

65 seats in Legislative Assembly of Alberta 33 seats were needed for a majority
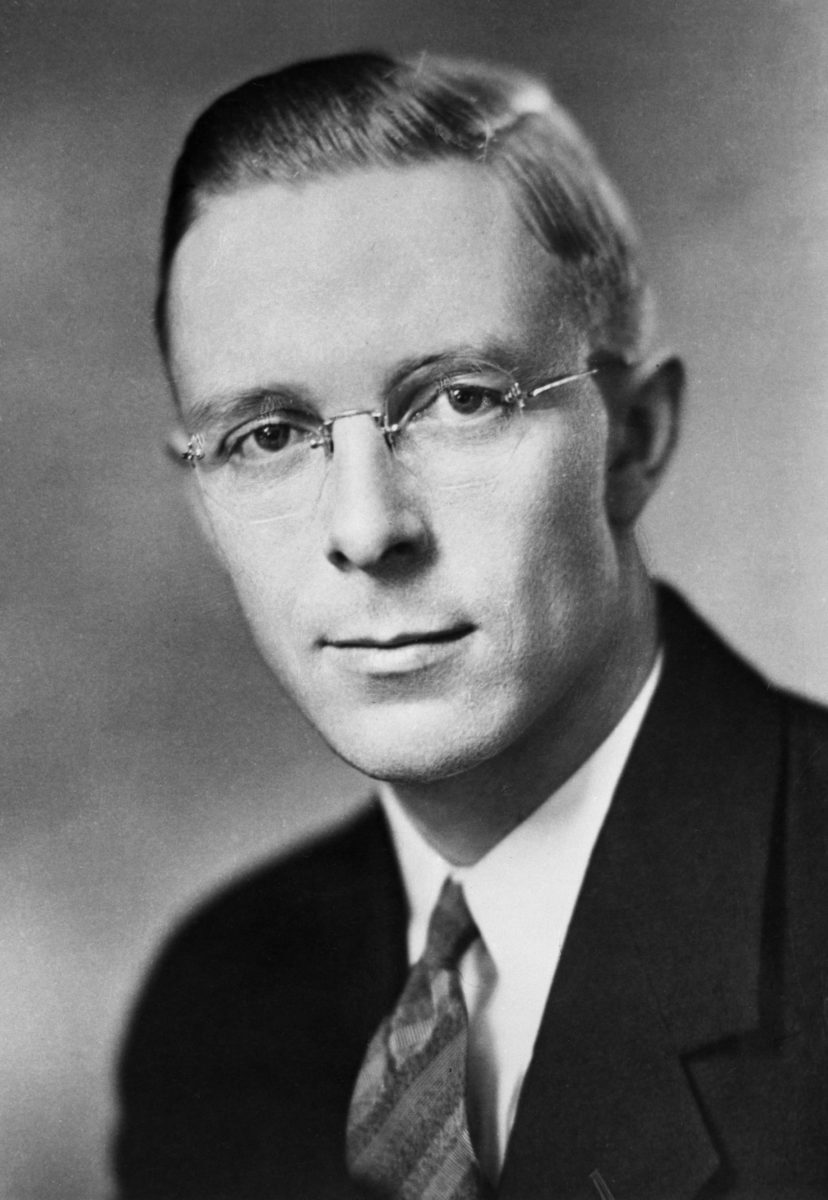

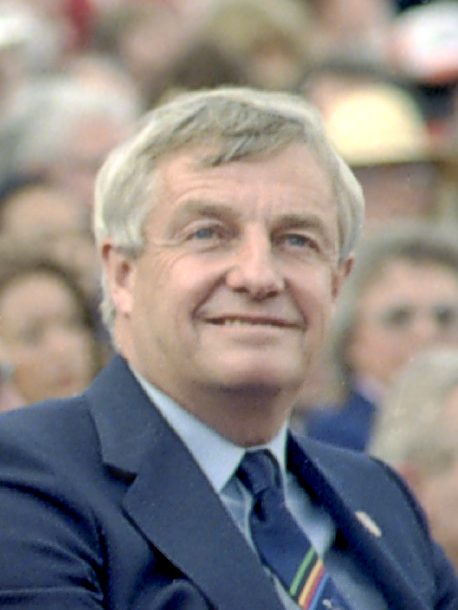
	Majority party	Minority party
Leader	Ernest Manning	Peter Lougheed
Party	Social Credit	Progressive Conservative
Leader since	May 31, 1943	1965
Leader's seat	Strathcona East	Calgary-West
Last election	60 seats, 54.8%	0 seats, 12.7%
Seats before	57	0
Seats won	55	6
Seat change	▼2	▲6
Popular vote	222,270	129,544
Percentage	44.6%	26.0%
Swing	▼10.2%	▲13.3%
	Third party	Fourth party
	LIB	NDP
Leader	Michael Maccagno	Neil Reimer
Party	Liberal	New Democratic
Leader since	January 28, 1967	January 27, 1963
Leader's seat	Lac La Biche	ran in Edson (lost)
Last election	2 seats, 19.8%	0 seats, 9.5%
Seats before	3	1
Seats won	3	0
Seat change	±0	▼1
Popular vote	53,847	79,610
Percentage	10.8%	16.0%
Swing	▼9.0%	▲6.5%
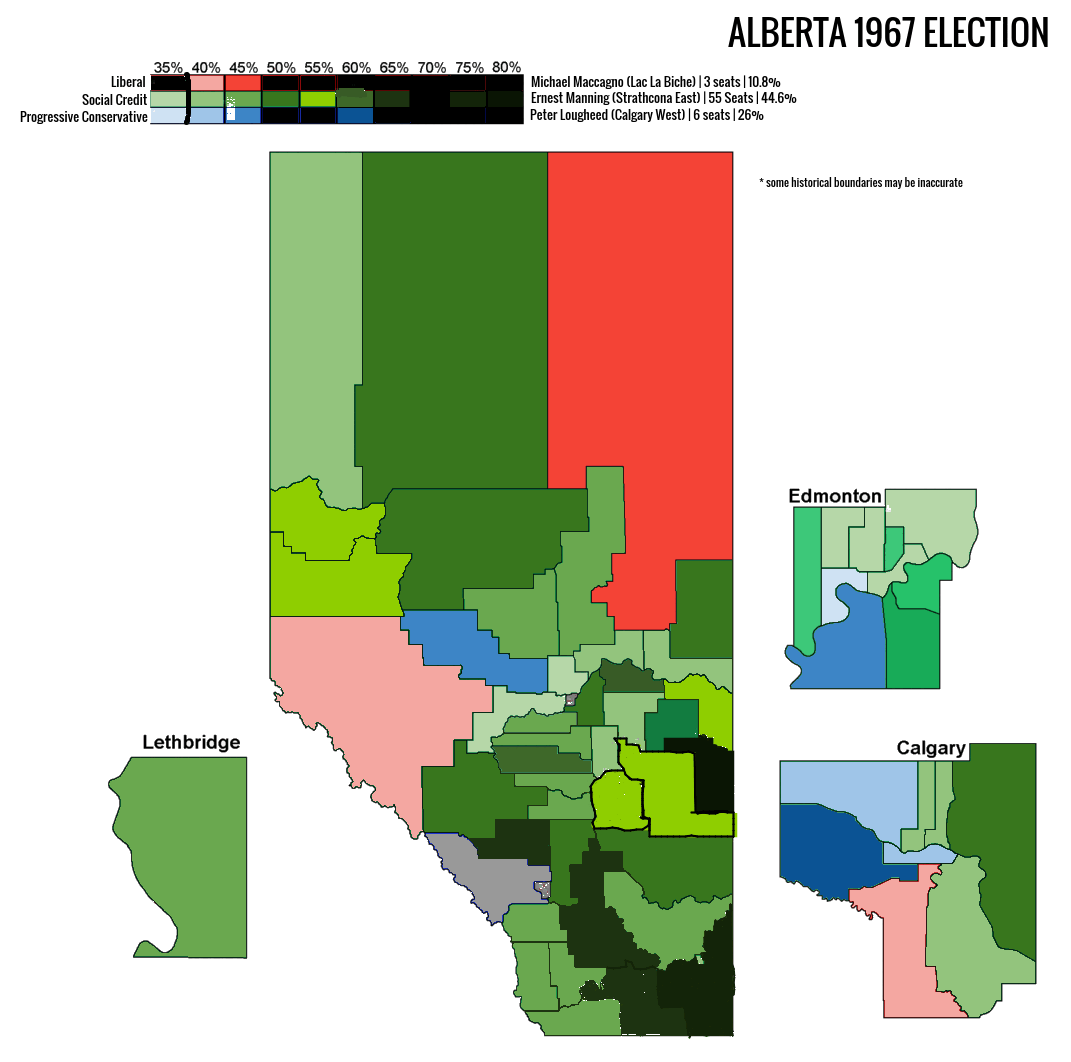
Premier before election
Ernest Manning
Social Credit
Premier after election
Ernest Manning
Social Credit

The 1967 Alberta general election was held on May 23, 1967, to elect members of the Legislative Assembly of Alberta to the 16th Alberta Legislature. The election was called after the 15th Alberta Legislature was prorogued on April 11, 1967, and dissolved on April 14, 1967.

Ernest C. Manning led the Social Credit Party to its ninth (and, as it turned out, final) consecutive majority government, winning 55 of the 65 seats in the legislature, despite getting less than 45 per cent of the popular vote. Although it was not apparent at the time, this proved to be an ominous sign for the party. The 1967 election was the first time the Social Credit government had won less than half the popular vote since 1955. The party won its lowest vote share since 1940.

The once-moribund Progressive Conservatives, led by young lawyer Peter Lougheed, emerged as the main opposition to Social Credit. They won over a quarter of the popular vote and six seats, mostly taking seats from Social Credit in the two major cities, Calgary and Edmonton. Social Credit was slow to adapt to the changes in Alberta as its two largest cities gained increasing influence.

Despite losing close to half of the share of the popular vote they had won in the 1963 election, the Liberals managed to increase their number of seats from two to three as a result of the decline in the Social Credit vote.

New Democrat Party candidates received 16 per cent of the vote but no seats.

Voters also decided upon the adoption of daylight saving time, in a province-wide plebiscite. It was defeated by a very slim margin with 51.25 per cent voting against.

Amendments to the Election Act in 1965 provided voting rights for Treaty Indians in provincial elections, making the 1967 election the first opportunity for Indigenous Albertans to vote in a provincial election.

== Background ==
=== Social Credit campaign ===
The Social Credit government had prepared well for the election in advance, with the party maintaining a significant war chest. The Social Credit government came under criticism for low non-renewable resource royalty rates compared to other developed nations, which it counted by saying the royalties were the highest in Canada. Social Credit focused on their governance record rather than make significant policy commitments, although the Social Credit government did commit to study rising car insurance rates. Furthermore the Social Credit government argued they spent the most per capita on social issues despite having the lowest tax rate.

An internal controversy occurred when Albert Bourcier, a Social Credit MLA from 1935 to 1952 filed papers to contest the Edmonton-Jasper Place constituency against incumbent Social Credit MLA John Horan. Bourcier was still an active member of the Social Credit Party, but was ejected from the party prior to the election. It was the second time Bourcier was ejected from the party, the first being in 1949 as a sitting MLA. Horan was re-elected with 36.3 per cent of the vote, while Bourcier received 1.5 per cent of the vote.

=== New Democratic Party campaign ===
The New Democratic Party (NDP) built a campaign on the foundation of higher oil royalties, greater participation by small businesses in oil and gas resources, transition electricity utilities to provincial ownership, provide for provincial car insurance, and development of rural natural gas infrastructure.

=== Progressive Conservative campaign ===
New leader Peter Lougheed and his supporters worked tirelessly to convince candidates to run in all 65 constituencies, however the Progressive Conservatives were only able to nominate 47 candidates, two more than the Liberal Party, but less than the full slate put forward by the Social Credit Party and the New Democratic Party. Lougheed sought candidates who were already public figures, often meeting with editors of local weekly newspapers, mayors and presidents of boards of trade to inquire who the community's leaders were. As the writ came closer Lougheed and the Progressive Conservatives realized they could not defeat Social Credit, instead focusing on becoming the Official Opposition. The campaign created red, white and blue promotional materials with the slogan "Alberta Needs an Alternative", while Lougheed's own material added his personal slogan "Let's Start It in Calgary West".

Lougheed sought a public debate amongst the four party leaders, however as a long time incumbent Manning was not willing to risk a debate which could produce little benefit and much harm for the Socreds. Manning's position on the debate changed when a group of Edmonton church leaders decided to host a leaders debate, Manning, a devout Christian and host of "Back to the Bible Hour" radio broadcasts, accepted the debate. Lougheed's performance in the debate was lauded by the Edmonton Journal and was credited by biographer George Wood as boosting the Progressive Conservatives in the Edmonton area, including Don Getty's improbable victory over Social Credit Education Minister Randolph McKinnon in Strathcona West. Other media began to take notice with Maclean's stating the only politician capable of having "an outside chance of challenging Manning" was Lougheed.

During the campaign, the Progressive Conservatives called for the sale of Alberta Government Telephones.

Lougheed was subsequently elected to the legislature in Calgary-West capturing 62 per cent of the vote, and the Progressive Conservatives captured 26 per cent of the vote province-wide with five other successful candidates, and subsequently Lougheed became Leader of the Opposition. The group of elected Conservatives known as the "original six" included Calgary MLAs Len Werry, David Russell; Edmonton area MLAs Lou Hyndman and Don Getty, and the party's only rural candidate and former federal Member of Parliament Hugh Horner. The Edmonton Journal positively remarked on Lougheed's success following the 1967 election, stating Albertans had a responsible and credible alternative as opposition.

=== Eligibility to vote ===
The 1967 Alberta general election had four sets of criteria for a person to be eligible to vote. A eligible voter must be a Canadian citizen or British subject prior to April 14, 1967; 19 years of age or older on voting day; a resident of Alberta for 12 months preceding April 14, 1967; and a resident of the constituency on April 14, 1967. Indigenous Albertans were eligible to vote for the first time in a provincial general election.

== Results ==

Party	Party leader	# of candidates	Seats				Popular vote		
Party	Party leader	# of candidates	1963	Dissolution	Elected	% Change	#	%	% Change
Social Credit	Ernest C. Manning	65	60	57	55	-8.3%	222,270	44.60%	-10.21%
Progressive Conservative	Peter Lougheed	47	-	-	6		129,544	26.00%	+13.29%
Liberal	Michael Maccagno	45	2	3	3	+50.0%	53,847	10.81%	-8.95%
Independent		7	-	-	1		6,916	1.38%	+0.40%
NDP	Neil Reimer	65	-	1	-	-	79,610	15.98%	+6.53%
Coalition	Frank Gainer	2	1	1	-	-100%	3,654	0.73%	+0.19%
Independent Progressive Conservative		2	*	-	-	*	1,118	0.22%	*
Liberal/Progressive Conservative	Ross Ellis	1	-	-	-	-	699	0.14%	-0.14%
Independent Social Credit		2	-	1	-	-	693	0.14%	-0.65%
Total		236	63	63	65	+3.2%	498,351	100%	
Source: Elections Alberta

Note:

* Party did not nominate candidates in the previous election

Popular vote
Social Credit	44.60%
PC	26.00%
New Democratic	15.98%
Liberal	10.81%
Others	2.61%

Seats summary
Social Credit	84.62%
PC	9.23%
Liberal	4.62%
Independent	1.54%

== Daylight saving time plebiscite ==
Daylight saving time plebiscite
- May 23, 1967
- Do you favour province-wide daylight saving time?

Results
Choice	Votes	%
Yes	236,555	48.75%
No	248,680	51.25%
Total votes	485,235	100.00%

The Province of Alberta voted on its fifth provincial plebiscite. Voters were asked to endorse a proposal to adopt daylight saving time (summer time). The proposal was rejected by a very slim margin. The question was asked again in the next election, and passed at that time.

=== Background ===
In 1948, the Government of Alberta formally set the province's time zone with the passage of The Daylight Saving Time Act, which mandated the entire province observe Mountain Standard Time, and prevented any municipality from observing daylight saving time or any other time zone. The bill came after Calgary (1946 and 1947), and Edmonton (1946) held municipal plebiscites which approved the move to daylight saving time. Edmonton under Mayor Harry Ainlay actually began to use DLT, which was forbidden under the new law.

Alberta's urban municipalities were in favour of daylight saving time and pressured the provincial government to hold a plebiscite or provide the authority for municipalities to locally observe daylight saving time. A joint motion of Calgary City Council and Edmonton City Council for a plebiscite was put to the Legislature in July 1963, with the support of Social Credit Minister and Edmonton Alderman Ethel Sylvia Wilson, without success.

A further effort in March 1964 by Liberal MLA and Calgary Alderman Bill Dickie to allow the matter to be settled by a municipal plebiscite also failed in the Legislature. In the debate, Social Credit MLA William Patterson described Daylight Saving Time as "that fandangled thing", and Minister Allen Russell Patrick stated municipal Daylight Savings Time would be difficult for tourists to understand.

A motion introduced by Bill Dickie was approved by the Legislature in February 1966 to hold a plebiscite on Daylight Saving Time. And on March 29, 1966, Minister Alfred Hooke introduced An Act to amend The Daylight Saving Time Act (Bill 75), to permit the government to hold a plebiscite on the issue.

On April 17, 1967, the Government of Alberta approved Order-in-Council 607/67 which provided the instructions for the plebiscite on Daylight Saving Time.

The prescribed question was "Do you favour Province-wide Daylight Saving Time?" with the two available responses as "Yes" and "No".

Across Canada, by 1967, each province besides Alberta and Saskatchewan had adopted Daylight Saving Time. Many Alberta businesses provided for modified summer hours, including the Alberta Stock Exchange which started at 7 a.m. to align with exchanges in Toronto and Montreal. Air Canada released a statement expressing the difficulty of distributing flight schedules with flights in Alberta.

=== Arguments for and against ===
Arguments for daylight saving time were put forward by the construction industry including the Alberta Construction Association and Edmonton Home Builders Association. The Calgary Herald editorial board published a number of editorials in advance of the plebiscite advocating for the province to observe daylight saving time, and further advocated for all of Canada to move to daylight saving time. Calgary residents and businessmen Bill Creighton and David Matthews led a campaign for daylight saving times, arguing the benefits of an additional hour of late sunlight for sports. Creighton was able to garner endorsements from the Alberta Amateur Athletics Union and other local golf, baseball, football and tennis associations. The Calgary Tourist and Convention Association endorsed daylight saving, noting that tourists perceived the province as "backwards" for not adopting the time shift. Liberal leader Michael Maccagno personally supported observing daylight saving time.

Arguments against daylight saving time were made by the group Alberta Council for Standard Time founded by Calgary lawyer and drive-in movie operator R.H. Barron. The Council ran a number of advertisements in local papers advocating for standard time, those arguments included the danger for children walking to school in the dark or twilight, and possible reductions to academic performance.

=== Aftermath ===
The plebiscite resulted in a narrow victory for retaining Mountain Standard Time, with 51.25 per cent of the population voting against daylight saving time. Alberta's large urban communities of Calgary, Edmonton, Lethbridge and Medicine Hat voted in favour, while the rural parts of the province voted against the proposal.

The new Progressive Conservative caucus continued to pressure the Social Credit government to provide individual municipalities the power to institute Daylight Saving Time. A February 1968 motion by Edmonton MLA Don Getty and Bill Dickie for municipal authority to institute daylight saving time was rejected by the Legislature.

In the aftermath of the plebiscite, the Calgary Herald blamed the defeat on "rural cousins" and the well organized Council for Standard Time, noting Calgarians voted two-to-one in favour of adopting daylight saving. The editorial board for the Calgary Herald decried the failure of the plebiscite, but predicted that the province would eventually adopt daylight saving time.

=== Results ===
Do you favour province-wide daylight saving time?
For	Against
236,555 48.75%	248,680 51.25%

== Results by riding ==
Electoral district	Candidates					Incumbent
Electoral district	Social Credit	PC	Liberal	NDP	Other	Incumbent
Alexandra	Anders O. Aalborg; 2,880; 57.85%	Kenneth E. Oates; 940; 18.88%	Charles F. Swan; 304; 6.11%	Lester A. Lindgren; 835; 16.77%		Anders O. Aalborg
Athabasca	Antonio Aloisio; 1,733; 45.08%		Dave Hunter; 939; 24.43%	George Opryshko; 1,170; 30.44%		Antonio Aloisio
Banff-Cochrane	Roy Wilson; 2,066; 42.17%			Jack Fraser; 374; 7.63%	Clarence Copithorne (Ind.); 2,428; 49.56%	Francis Leo Gainer
Bonnyville	Romeo B. Lamothe; 2,339; 54.12%			Kenneth Joseph Kerr; 316; 7.31%		Romeo B. Lamothe
Bow Valley-Empress	Fred T. Mandeville; 2,525; 49.16%			Calvin Steinley; 549; 10.69%	Ben M. MacLeod (Coal.); 2,018; 39.63%	William Delday
Calgary Bowness	Charles E. Johnston; 6,461; 37.63%	Len F. Werry; 6,828; 39.77%	John Donachie; 1,876; 10.93%	Evelyn Moore; 1,905; 11.09%		Charles E. Johnston
Calgary Centre	Frederick C. Colborne; 3,873; 40.47%	Charles Henry Cook; 3,359; 35.10%	John Starchuk; 1,275; 13.32%	Mrs. Margaret Hanley; 973; 10.17%		Frederick C. Colborne
Calgary-East	Albert W. Ludwig; 5,563; 50.43%	Jim Crawford; 2,613; 23.69%	Sandy Skoryko; 803; 7.28%	Kurt Gebauer; 1,955; 17.72%		Albert W. Ludwig
Calgary-Glenmore	Len Pearson; 3,840; 27.43%	Ronald M. Helmer; 3,406; 24.33%	William Daniel Dickie; 5,743; 41.02%	Max Wolfe; 950; 6.79%		William Daniel Dickie
Calgary-North	Robert A. Simpson; 4,308; 42.74%	Henry M. Beaumont; 3,915; 38.84%	Charles W. Loughridge; 638; 6.33%	Walter H. Siewert; 1,157; 11.48%		Robert A. Simpson
Calgary Queens Park	Lea Leavitt; 4,943; 42.13%	Eric Charles Musgreave; 3,820; 32.56%	Darryl Raymaker; 1,702; 14.51%	Lisa Baldwin; 1,220; 10.40%		
Calgary-South	Arthur J. Dixon; 5,401; 41.76%	Joe Clark; 4,940; 38.19%	Willis E. O'Leary; 1,146; 8.86%	Jack D. Peters; 1,388; 10.73%		Arthur J. Dixon
Calgary Victoria Park	Art Davis; 3,956; 35.49%	David J. Russell; 4,796; 43.03%	Reginald J. Gibbs; 1,088; 9.76%	Ted Takacs; 1,229; 11.03%		
Calgary-West	Donald S. Fleming; 4,028; 28.95%	Peter Lougheed; 8,548; 61.43%	Natalie Chapman; 402; 2.89%	Allan M. Early; 868; 6.24%		Donald S. Fleming
Camrose	Chester I. Sayers; 3,083; 44.25%	Emmett G. Mohler; 1,736; 24.91%	G. Rod Knaut; 699; 10.03%	Rudy P. Swanson; 1,412; 20.26%		Chester I. Sayers
Cardston	Alvin F. Bullock; 2,120; 47.11%	Larry L. Lang; 1,692; 37.60%		Leslie N. Howard; 104; 2.31%	Robert D. Burt (Ind.); 573; 12.73%	Edgar W. Hinman
Clover Bar	Walt A. Buck; 4,101; 51.35%	Daniel F. Hollands; 2,215; 27.73%	Kazmer D. Curry; 468; 5.86%	Alfred O. Arnston; 1,175; 14.71%		Floyd M. Baker
Cypress	Harry E. Strom; 2,577; 76.65%			William George McFall; 769; 22.87%		Harry E. Strom
Drumheller-Gleichen	Gordon Edward Taylor; 4,018; 67.46%	Tom Hanson; 1,579; 26.51%		Garry B. Law; 345; 5.79%		Gordon Edward Taylor
Dunvegan	Ernest L. Lee; 1,280; 41.52%			Phil Thompson; 1,080; 35.03%	John A. Hammond (Coal.); 547; 18.82%	Ernest L. Lee
Edmonton North	Ethel Sylvia Wilson; 4,698; 38.21%	Tony Thibaudeau; 3,461; 28.15%	L. John Corbiere; 1,303; 10.60%	Gordon S.B. Wright; 2,763; 22.47%		
Edmonton-Centre	Ambrose Holowach; 3,146; 39.12%	Harold W. Veale; 2,558; 31.81%	Joseph A. Tannous; 747; 9.29%	Henry Tomaschuk; 1,313; 16.33%	Pat G.A. O'Hara (Ind.); 194; 2.41%	Ambrose Holowach
Edmonton-Jasper Place	John William Horan; 4,206; 36.34%	Gerard Joseph Amerongen; 3,000; 25.92%	Barry Vogel; 1,851; 15.99%	Tom Hennessey; 2,210; 19.09%	Albert V. Bourcier (Ind. SoCred); 176	John William Horan
Edmonton-North East	Lou W. Heard; 5,052; 35.02%	Alan T. Cooke; 3,616; 25.06%	Peter Achtem; 1,418; 9.83%	Ivor G. Dent; 4,276; 29.64%		Lou W. Heard
Edmonton-North West	Edgar H. Gerhart; 4,674; 36.10%	Paul Norris; 4,205; 32.48%	Thomas Leia; 1,173; 9.06%	Dave Belland; 2,664; 20.58%	Oscar A. Green (Ind.); 188; 1.45%	Edgar H. Gerhart
Edmonton-Norwood	William Tomyn; 3,450; 43.01%	Ronald W. Downey; 2,023; 25.22%		Grant W. Notley; 2,433; 30.33%		William Tomyn
Edmonton-West	William A. Johnson; 4,016; 32.46%	Lou Hyndman; 4,753; 38.42%	J. Bernard Feehan; 2,316; 18.72%	Thomas C. Pocklington; 1,254; 10.14%		Stanley Gordon Geldart
Edson	Arthur O. Jorgensen; 2,372; 34.59%		William A. Switzer; 2,803; 40.87%	C. Neil Reimer; 1,656; 24.15%		William Switzer
Grande Prairie	Ira McLaughlin; 4,847; 55.38%		George M. Repka; 1,132; 12.93%	Alan Bush; 2,748; 31.40%		Ira McLaughlin
Grouard	Roy Ells; 3,363; 51.02%		Gunnar Walhstrom; 985; 14.94%	Stan Daniels; 2,207; 33.49%		Roy Ells
Hand Hills-Acadia	Clinton Keith French; 2,675; 50.17%	Bill Cross; 2,140; 40.14%		Ralph G. Jorgenson; 504; 9.45%		Clinton Keith French
Lac La Biche	Harry Lobay; 1,613; 34.22%		Michael Maccagno; 2,212; 46.93%	Fred Ustina; 758; 16.08%		Michael Maccagno
Lac Ste. Anne	William Patterson; 1,731; 30.14%	Hugh F. Horner; 2,573; 44.80%	Raymond Mills; 723; 12.59%	Swen Symington; 674; 11.74%		William Patterson
Lacombe	Allan Russell Patrick; 2,690; 49.11%	John William Cookson; 1,999; 36.49%		Glen R. Nelson; 777; 14.18%		Allan Russell Patrick
Leduc	James D. Henderson; 2,193; 45.38%	Emanuel Prycz; 1,206; 24.96%	Russell Olekshy; 383; 7.93%	Alex A. Sklarenko; 1,021; 21.13%		James D. Henderson
Lethbridge	John C. Landeryou; 6,155; 44.27%	Wilfred Bowns; 4,128; 29.69%	John I. Boras; 2,237; 16.09%	Klaas Buijert; 1,335; 9.60%		John C. Landeryou
Little Bow	Raymond Albert Speaker; 3,367; 68.25%			John K. Head; 572; 11.60%	Arthur W. Ulrich (Ind.); 978; 19.83%	Raymond Albert Speaker
Macleod	Leighton E. Buckwell; 2,822; 51.68%	George Whitehead; 1,773; 32.47%	Melba J. Cochlan; 149; 2.73%	Sid J. Cornish; 673; 12.32%		James Hartley
Medicine Hat	Harry C. Leinweber; 4,390; 39.96%	James Horsman; 2,701; 24.59%	Roy Weidermann; 2,025; 18.43%	Ted. J. Grimm; 1,819; 16.56%		Harry C. Leinweber
Okotoks-High River	Edward P. Benoit; 2,289; 48.50%	Thomas E. Hughes; 2,097; 44.43%	Ron A. Baker; 88; 1.86%	Georgina M. Smith; 212; 4.49%		Edward P. Benoit
Olds-Didsbury	Robert Curtis Clark; 4,052; 65.02%		Stan Bell; 1,129; 18.12%	Eva Banta; 485; 7.78%	Chas. Purvis (Ind. Con.); 547; 8.80%	Robert Curtis Clark
Peace River	Robert H. Wiebe; 2,860; 53.49%			Harry Reinders; 1,338; 25.02%	Edward R. Whitney (Ind.); 1,149; 21.49%	Euell F. Montgomery
Pembina	Adam Carl Muller; 2,866; 47.23%	Edward G. Samuel; 2,098; 34.57%	Edward P. MacCallum; 484; 7.98%	George A.E. Garnett; 576; 9.49%		Robin D. Jorgenson
Pincher Creek-Crowsnest	Charles Duncan Drain; 2,345; 45.78%	Alexander B. Wells; 722; 14.10%	F. Benton Murphy; 255; 4.98%	Garth A. Turcott; 1,772; 34.60%		Garth Turcott
Ponoka	Neville S. Roper; 3,286; 62.04%		Derek R. Broughton; 514; 9.70%	Ed Nelson; 1,464; 27.64%		Glen F. Johnston
Red Deer	William Kenneth Ure; 6,166; 46.42%	James L. Foster; 4,628; 34.84%	Robert H. Scammell; 636; 4.79%	Ethel Taylor; 1,799; 13.54%		William Kenneth Ure
Redwater	Michael Senych; 1,588; 43.42%	Basil Zailo; 1,314; 35.93%		Norman T. Flack; 737; 20.15%		Michael Senych
Rocky Mountain House	Alfred J. Hooke; 2,538; 53.21%			Gilbert H.C. Farthing; 792; 16.60%	Will Sinclair (Ind.); 1,406; 29.48%	Alfred J. Hooke
Sedgewick-Coronation	Jack C. Hillman; 3,470; 59.41%	Ernie Moore; 1,103; 18.88%	Eugene F. Price; 547; 9.36%	Arthur C. Bunney; 680; 11.64%		Jack C. Hillman
Spirit River	Adolph O. Fimrite; 2,627; 56.12%		John L. Listhaeghe; 413; 8.82%	Bert M. Strand; 1,634; 34.91%		Adolph O. Fimrite
St. Albert	Keith Everitt; 2,824; 35.44%	Stanley M. Walker; 1,469; 18.43%	Robert A. Russell; 2,297; 28.82%	Norman Dolman; 1,339; 16.80%		Keith Everitt
St. Paul	Raymond Reierson; 2,275; 44.29%		Armand Lamothe; 1,489; 28.99%	Pierre M. Vallee; 788; 15.34%	Leroy P. Christensen (Ind. P.C.); 571; 11.12%	Raymond Reierson
Stettler	Galen C. Norris; 2,659; 54.88%	Bob McKnight; 1,461; 30.15%		Morton H. Neilson; 635; 13.11%		Galen C. Norris
Stony Plain	Ralph A. Jespersen; 2,316; 36.25%	Frank Flanagan; 1,670; 26.14%		Maurice R. McCullagh; 1,855; 29.03%	Cornelia R. Wood (Ind. SoCred); 517; 8.13%	Cornelia R. Wood
Strathcona Centre	Joseph Donovan Ross; 4,052; 40.50%	Larry Boddy; 2,493; 24.92%	Ian Nicoll; 1,794; 17.93%	Gordon E. Weese; 1,627; 16.26%		Joseph Donovan Ross
Strathcona East	Ernest C. Manning; 6,314; 49.70%	C. Jack Thorpe; 2,976; 23.43%	Percy Marshall; 1,458; 11.48%	Ray Field; 1,909; 15.03%		Ernest C. Manning
Strathcona South	Joe G. Radstaak; 3,934; 40.73%	Oscar H. Kruger; 2,594; 26.86%	John Kloster; 968; 10.02%	Bill McLean; 2,123; 21.98%		
Strathcona West	Randolph H. McKinnon; 5,153; 36.87%	Donald Ross Getty; 6,764; 48.39%	Edmund H. Leger; 890; 6.37%	Frank Kuzemski; 1,115; 7.98%		Randolph H. McKinnon
Taber-Warner	Douglas Miller; 3,451; 61.24%	Emil D. Gundlock; 1,170; 20.76%	Theodore Rudd; 683; 12.12%	Dick Verwoerd; 292; 5.18%		Leonard C. Halmrast
Three Hills	Raymond Ratzlaff; 2,762; 50.48%	Gordon Leslie; 1,113; 20.34%	James A. Lore; 1,317; 24.07%	George E. Pieper; 268; 4.90%		Roy Davidson
Vegreville-Bruce	Alex W. Gordey; 2,497; 44.41%	Mike W. Kawulych; 1,742; 30.98%	Wilfrid L. Horton; 345; 6.14%	Albin Lukawiecki; 1,010; 17.96%		Alex W. Gordey
Vermilion	Ashley H. Cooper; 2,545; 57.80%	Hilda Wilson; 1,199; 27.23%		Harry E. Yaremchuk; 642; 14.58%		Ashley H. Cooper
Wainwright	Henry A. Ruste; 3,807; 82.15%			Glenn Valleau; 789; 17.03%		Henry A. Ruste
Wetaskiwin	Albert W. Strohschein; 2,879; 45.67%	Dallas Schmidt; 2,408; 38.20%		Robert P. Christensen; 1,000; 15.86%		Albert W. Strohschein
Willingdon-Two Hills	Nicholas A. Melnyk; 2,160; 62.25%			Louis Souter; 1,298; 37.41%		Nicholas A. Melnyk

== See also ==
- 1948 electrification plebiscite
- 1957 liquor plebiscite
- 1971 daylight saving time plebiscite
- List of Alberta political parties
