= Jasper West =

Defunct provincial electoral district in Alberta, Canada

Alberta electoral district

Defunct provincial electoral district
- Legislature: Legislative Assembly of Alberta
- District created: 1959
- District abolished: 1971
- First contested: 1959
- Last contested: 1967

Jasper West was a provincial electoral district in Alberta, Canada, mandated to return a single member to the Legislative Assembly of Alberta using the first past the post method of voting from 1959 to 1963.

== History ==
It was created after Edmonton broke up into nine districts after the province standardized to the First Past the Post voting system in 1959.

In 1963 the district was renamed Edmonton Jasper Place, which in 1971 was re-made into the Edmonton-Meadowlark district.

=== 1959 Redistribution ===
The historic 1959 redistribution of the provincial ridings of Calgary and Edmonton dismantled the proportional representation system previously in use in the cities and changed the voting system to First Past the Post single member districts. From 1924 to 1956 Calgary and Edmonton members were elected by Single Transferable Vote in multi-member districts. The rest of the province had used Instant-runoff voting in single-member districts.

The 1959 redistribution created nine districts in Edmonton.

The other eight ridings were Edmonton Centre, Edmonton North, Edmonton Norwood, Edmonton North East, Edmonton North West, Strathcona Centre, Strathcona East, and Strathcona West.

== Election Results 1959 ==
1959 Alberta general election
Party	Candidate	Votes	%	±%
Social Credit	Richard H. Jamieson	5,047	40.91%	–
Progressive Conservative	John Percy Page	4,507	36.54%	–
Liberal	Abe William Miller	2,782	22.55%	–
Total		12,336	–	–
Rejected, spoiled and declined		80	–	–
Eligible electors / turnout		19,592	63.37%	–
Social Credit pickup new district.				
Source(s) Source: "Jasper-West Official Results 1959 Alberta general election". Alberta Heritage Community Foundation.

== See also ==
- List of Alberta provincial electoral districts
- Canadian provincial electoral districts
