= Strathcona West =

Defunct provincial electoral district in Alberta, Canada

Alberta electoral district

Defunct provincial electoral district
- Legislature: Legislative Assembly of Alberta
- District created: 1959
- District abolished: 1971
- First contested: 1959
- Last contested: 1967

Strathcona West was a provincial electoral district in Alberta, Canada, mandated to return a single member to the Legislative Assembly of Alberta using the first past the post method of voting from 1959 to 1971.

== History ==
The historic 1959 redistribution of the provincial ridings of Calgary and Edmonton standardized the voting system back to First Past the Post. From 1926 to 1959, members in Calgary and Edmonton were elected by Single Transferable Vote, while the rest of the province had the option of how to count ballots. The redistribution created nine ridings in Edmonton. The other eight ridings were Edmonton Centre, Edmonton North, Edmonton Norwood, Edmonton North East, Edmonton North West, Strathcona East, Strathcona Centre, and Jasper West.

In 1971 the riding was split between Edmonton-Whitemud and Edmonton-Parkallen.

=== Members of the Legislative Assembly (MLAs) ===
Members of the Legislative Assembly for Strathcona West
Assembly	Years	Member	Party
See Edmonton electoral district from 1921-1959
14th	1959–1963	Randolph McKinnon	Social Credit
15th	1963–1967	Randolph McKinnon	Social Credit
16th	1967–1971	Don Getty	Progressive Conservative
See Edmonton-Parkallen electoral district from 1971-1993 and Edmonton-Whitemud electoral district from 1971-Present

== Election results ==
=== 1959 ===
1959 Alberta general election
Party	Candidate	Votes	%
Social Credit	Randolph McKinnon	3,639	41.63%
Progressive Conservative	Eric Duggan	2,683	30.69%
Liberal	Frank Edwards	1,982	22.67%
Co-operative Commonwealth	H. Douglas Trace	423	5.01%
Total		8,742	–
Rejected, spoiled and declined		15	–
Eligible electors / turnout		13,355	65.46%
Social Credit pickup new district.			
Source(s) Source: "Strathcona West Official Results 1959 Alberta general election". Alberta Heritage Community Foundation.

=== 1963 ===
1963 Alberta general election
Party	Candidate	Votes	%	±%
Social Credit	Randolph McKinnon	5,029	47.47%	6.84%
Liberal	Arthur Crossley	2,557	24.14%	1.47%
Progressive Conservative	Arnold Lane	1,863	17.59%	-13.10%
New Democratic	George Field	936	10.80%	5.79%
Total		10,594	–	–
Rejected, spoiled and declined		209	–	–
Eligible electors / turnout		17,738	59.72%	–
Social Credit hold		Swing		2.69%
Source(s) Source: "Strathcona West Official Results 1963 Alberta general election". Alberta Heritage Community Foundation.

=== 1967 ===
1967 Alberta general election
Party	Candidate	Votes	%	±%
Progressive Conservative	Don Getty	6,764	48.39%	31.10%
Social Credit	Randolph McKinnon	5,153	36.87%	-10.60%
New Democratic	Frank Kuzemski	1,115	7.98%	-2.82%
Liberal	Edmund Leger	890	6.37%	-17.77%
Total		13,978	–	–
Rejected, spoiled and declined		56	–	–
Eligible electors / turnout		19,880	70.31%	–
Progressive Conservative gain from Social Credit		Swing		20.85%
Source(s) Source: "Strathcona West Official Results 1967 Alberta general election". Alberta Heritage Community Foundation.

== See also ==
- List of Alberta provincial electoral districts
- Canadian provincial electoral districts
