= Dave Hunter (politician) =

Canadian politician (1913–1985)

David Bruce "Dave" Hunter

Leader of the Alberta Liberal Party
- In office 1962–1964
- Preceded by: Grant MacEwan
- Succeeded by: Michael Maccagno

Personal details
- Born: September 12, 1913 Athabasca, Alberta, Canada
- Died: January 12, 1985 (aged 71) Victoria, British Columbia, Canada
- Party: Liberal
- Occupation: politician

David Bruce Hunter (September 12, 1913 – January 12, 1985) was an Alberta politician. He served as a mayor and as leader of the Alberta Liberal Party from 1962 to 1964.

== Early life ==
David Bruce Hunter was born in Elnora, Alberta in 1913.

He served with the Royal Canadian Airforce in World War II as a Squadron Leader. In addition to his career in politics, he established and operated Hunter Motors Ltd. in Athabasca, now a third-generation family-owned GM dealership.

== Political career ==
Hunter served as mayor of the town of Athabasca, Alberta for five years and served as a councilor for another six years.

He was chosen leader of the Alberta Liberal Party at a leadership convention held in Calgary on January 16, 1962 but failed to win the provincial Athabasca seat in the Alberta legislature in the 1963 provincial election.

Hunter ran for a seat to the Alberta Legislature as leader for the second time in a by-election held in the Three Hills electoral district on January 20, 1964. He finished a close second of four candidates losing to Progressive Conservative candidate Roy Davidson. Hunter resigned the leadership of the party after his election loss.

Hunter was also unsuccessful in his attempt to win the federal Athabasca seat in the House of Commons of Canada in the 1965 federal election and in his second attempt to win a seat in the provincial legislature in 1967.

In later life, Hunter moved to Victoria, British Columbia where he died of a heart attack in 1985.
