= Calgary Queens Park =

Defunct provincial electoral district in Alberta, Canada

Coordinates: 51.0972°N 114.0639°W

Alberta electoral district

Defunct provincial electoral district
- Legislature: Legislative Assembly of Alberta
- District created: 1963
- District abolished: 1971
- First contested: 1963
- Last contested: 1967

Calgary Queens Park was a provincial electoral district in Calgary, Alberta, Canada, mandated to return a single member to the Legislative Assembly of Alberta using the first past the post method of voting from 1963 to 1971.

== History ==
The riding was created from a slice of Calgary Bowness during the 1963 election. The riding disappeared when it was merged with Calgary North to create Calgary-McKnight during the 1971 election.

The riding was a thin strip that ran north from Downtown Calgary to the north end city limits, and on the west side of Centre Street.

=== Members of the Legislative Assembly (MLAs) ===
Members of the Legislative Assembly for Calgary Queens Park
Assembly	Years	Member	Party
See Calgary Bowness electoral district from 1959-1963
15th	1963–1967	Lee Leavitt	Social Credit
16th	1967–1971	Lee Leavitt	Social Credit
See Calgary-McKnight electoral district from 1971-1993

== Election results ==
=== 1963 ===
1963 Alberta general election
Party	Candidate	Votes	%	±%
Social Credit	Lee Leavitt	4,363	49.25%	–
Progressive Conservative	Duncan L. McKillop	1,597	18.03%	–
Independent	Roy Farran	1,469	16.58%	–
Liberal	John Donnachie	794	8.96%	–
New Democratic	Ben S. Greenfield	509	5.75%	–
Independent Social Credit	Conrad Pfeifer	126	1.42%	–
Total		8,858	–	–
Rejected, spoiled and declined		196	–	–
Eligible electors / turnout		16,569	54.64%	–
Social Credit pickup new district.				
Source(s) Source: "Calgary-Queen's park Official Results 1963 Alberta general election". Alberta Heritage Community Foundation.

=== 1967 ===
1967 Alberta general election
Party	Candidate	Votes	%	±%
Social Credit	Lee Leavitt	4,943	41.96%	-7.29%
Progressive Conservative	Eric C. Musgreave	3,915	33.23%	15.21%
Liberal	Darryl Raymaker	1,702	14.45%	5.48%
New Democratic	Lisa Baldwin	1,220	10.36%	4.61%
Total		11,780	–	–
Rejected, spoiled and declined		N/A	–	–
Eligible electors / turnout		17,843	66.02%	11.38%
Social Credit hold		Swing		-11.25%
Source(s) Source: "Calgary-Queen's park Official Results 1967 Alberta general election". Alberta Heritage Community Foundation.

== See also ==
- List of Alberta provincial electoral districts
- Canadian provincial electoral districts
