= Connie Osterman =

Canadian politician

The Honourable Connie Osterman ECA

Member of the Legislative Assembly of Alberta
- In office March 14, 1979 – May 5, 1992
- Preceded by: Allan Warrack
- Succeeded by: Don MacDonald
- Constituency: Three Hills

Minister of Consumer and Corporate Affairs
- In office November 1982 – November 1, 1985
- Preceded by: Julian Koziak
- Succeeded by: Al Adair

Minister of Social Services and Community Health
- In office November 1, 1985 – May 1986
- Preceded by: Neil Webber

Minister of Social Services
- In office May 1986 – March 1989
- Succeeded by: John Oldring

Personal details
- Born: Constantine Elaine Oel; June 23, 1936 Acme, Alberta, Canada
- Died: September 26, 2026 (aged 90) Didsbury, Alberta, Canada
- Party: Progressive Conservative
- Spouse(s): Joe Osterman, married 70 years
- Occupation: politician

Constantine Elaine "Connie" Osterman ECA (née Oel; June 23, 1936 – September 26, 2026) was a Canadian politician from the province of Alberta. She served in the Legislative Assembly of Alberta from 1979 to 1992 as a member of the Progressive Conservative caucus in government. She served as a cabinet minister in the governments of Premier Peter Lougheed and Don Getty from 1982 to 1989.

== Political career ==
Osterman first ran for a seat to the Legislative Assembly of Alberta in the 1979 general election, as the Progressive Conservative candidate in the electoral district of Three Hills; she defeated three other candidates by a large margin.

In the 1982 Alberta general election Osterman won nearly quadruple the votes of her two opponents to hold her seat. She was then appointed Minister of Consumer and Corporate Affairs by Premier Peter Lougheed. Osterman was only the fifth woman in Alberta political history to be appointed to the provincial cabinet.

When Don Getty became Premier in 1985, he appointed Osterman Minister of Social Services and Community Health. In the 1986 general election Osterman won a straight fight against NDP candidate Vernal Poole with a huge majority.

After the election Getty changed Osterman's portfolio to the Ministry of Social Services. In the 1989 general election she defeated three other candidates to keep her seat.

Osterman was removed from cabinet by Premier Getty one week after a judicial inquiry into the Principal Group scandal was completed in July 1989. As Minister Osterman rejected recommendations from an Assistant Deputy Minister Darwish regarding the insolvent state of Principal Group subsidiaries. Darwish later testified that he interpreted a phone call from Osterman as a threat to his career when he insisted on a meeting to discuss the issue, and Darwish retired six months later. Eventually on June 30, 1987, Treasurer Dick Johnston cancelled the operating licenses of the subsidiaries which resulted in Principal Group declaring bankruptcy six weeks later. The inquiry headed by William Code found Osterman "neglectful and misguided" when she failed to act on the warnings of Darwish.

Osterman resigned her seat in the legislature on May 5, 1992.

== Late life ==
Osterman has served on the board of directors for the Head Injured Relearning Society in Calgary.

She died in Didsbury, Alberta on September 26, 2026, at the age of 90.
