= Drumheller-Gleichen =

Defunct provincial electoral district in Alberta, Canada

Alberta electoral district

Defunct provincial electoral district
- Legislature: Legislative Assembly of Alberta
- District created: 1960
- District abolished: 1970
- First contested: 1963
- Last contested: 1967

Drumheller-Gleichen was a provincial electoral district in Alberta, Canada, mandated to return a single member to the Legislative Assembly of Alberta using the first-past-the-post method of voting from 1963 to 1971.

== History ==
The electoral district was created in the 1963 boundary redistribution when the Drumheller electoral district was merged with the Gleichen district.

After redistribution in 1970, the district would be formed into Drumheller, and the Gliechen portion would be added to Little Bow.

=== Members of the Legislative Assembly (MLAs) ===
Members of the Legislative Assembly for Drumheller-Gleichen
Assembly	Years	Member	Party
See Drumheller electoral district from 1930-1963 and Gleichen electoral district from 1905-1963
15th	1963–1967	Gordon E. Taylor	Social Credit
16th	1967–1971	Gordon E. Taylor	Social Credit
See Drumheller electoral district from 1971-1997 and Little Bow electoral district from 1971-2019

== Electoral history ==
=== 1963 ===
1963 Alberta general election
Party	Candidate	Votes	%	±%
Social Credit	Gordon Taylor	4,565	86.38%	–
New Democratic	Irene Dyck	720	13.62%	–
Total		5,285	–	–
Rejected, spoiled and declined		19	–	–
Eligible electors / turnout		8,334	63.64%	–
Source(s) Source: "Drumheller-Gleichen Official Results 1963 Alberta general election". Alberta Heritage Community Foundation.

=== 1967 ===
1967 Alberta general election
Party	Candidate	Votes	%	±%
Social Credit	Gordon Taylor	4,018	67.62%	-18.76%
Progressive Conservative	Tom Hanson	1,579	26.57%	–
New Democratic	Garry B. Law	345	5.81%	-7.82%
Total		5,942	–	–
Rejected, spoiled and declined		14	–	–
Eligible electors / turnout		8,778	67.85%	–
Social Credit hold		Swing		-15.85%
Source(s) Source: "Drumheller-Gleichen Official Results 1967 Alberta general election". Alberta Heritage Community Foundation.

== See also ==
- List of Alberta provincial electoral districts
- Canadian provincial electoral districts
- Drumheller, a town in south-eastern Alberta
- Gleichen, a hamlet in Alberta
