= Petrie Meston =

Canadian politician

L. Petrie Meston

Member of the Legislative Assembly of Alberta
- In office June 17, 1963 – November 22, 1963
- Preceded by: New District
- Succeeded by: Roy Davidson
- Constituency: Three Hills

Personal details
- Born: March 20, 1916
- Died: November 22, 1963 (aged 47) Drumheller, Alberta
- Party: Social Credit
- Occupation: politician

Louis Petrie Meston (March 20, 1916 – November 22, 1963) was a provincial politician from Alberta, Canada. He served as a member of the Legislative Assembly of Alberta in 1963 as a member of the governing Social Credit caucus. He also served as a municipal councilor.

== Political career ==
Meston began his political career serving as a municipal councilor and Reeve for the M. D. of Kneehill (now known as Kneehill County).

Meston ran for a seat to the Alberta Legislature in the 1963 Alberta general election. He was nominated to stand as Social Credit candidate in the new electoral district of Three Hills on April 20, 1963. In the election Meston defeated two other candidates by a wide margin to pick up the seat for his party.

Meston died on November 22, 1963, in Drumheller, Alberta. He died before the first sitting of the 15th Alberta Legislative Assembly and never got to take his seat.
