= Don MacDonald =

Canadian politician

Donald "Don" MacDonald

Member of the Legislative Assembly of Alberta
- In office October 26, 1992 – June 15, 1993
- Preceded by: Connie Osterman
- Succeeded by: District Abolished
- Constituency: Three Hills

Personal details
- Party: Liberal
- Occupation: politician

Donald "Don" MacDonald is a former politician from Alberta, Canada. He served in the Legislative Assembly of Alberta from 1992 to 1993.

== Political career ==
MacDonald first ran for a seat to the Alberta Legislature in a by-election held on October 26, 1992, in the electoral district of Three Hills as a candidate of the Liberal Party. He won the district with 46% of the popular vote in a stunning upset.

A few months later, in the 1993 Alberta general election, MacDonald ran in the new electoral district of Three Hills-Airdrie as his old riding was abolished during redistribution. He was defeated by Progressive Conservative candidate Carol Haley by a wide margin.

In the 1997 Alberta general election, he ran under the Social Credit banner in the district of Olds-Didsbury-Three Hills. He finished second to Progressive Conservative candidate Richard Marz.

MacDonald holds the record for the shortest time served in the Alberta legislature between election and defeat, at seven months and 20 days.
