= Allan Warrack =

Canadian politician (1937–2026)

Member of the Legislative Assembly of Alberta
- In office August 30, 1971 – March 14, 1979
- Preceded by: Raymond Ratzlaff
- Succeeded by: Connie Osterman
- Constituency: Three Hills

Minister of Lands and Forests
- In office September 10, 1971 – March 1975
- Preceded by: Joseph Ross
- Succeeded by: Bud Miller

Minister of Utilities and Telephones
- In office March 1975 – March 1979
- Preceded by: Roy Farran
- Succeeded by: Larry Shaben

Personal details
- Born: May 24, 1937 Calgary, Alberta, Canada
- Died: July 24, 2026 (aged 89)
- Party: Progressive Conservative (before 2019); NDP (2019 onward)
- Spouse: Jean Warrack
- Occupation: Professor, politician

Allan Alexander Warrack (May 24, 1937 – July 24, 2026) was a Canadian politician from the province of Alberta. He was in the Legislative Assembly of Alberta as a member of the governing Progressive Conservative caucus from 1971 to 1979. He held several portfolios in the government of Premier Peter Lougheed. He later taught at the University of Alberta.

== Early life ==
Allan Alexander Warrack was born in Calgary, Alberta, Canada on May 24, 1937.

== Political career ==
Warrack first ran for a seat to the Alberta Legislature in the 1971 general election, as a Progressive Conservative candidate in the electoral district of Three Hills. He defeated the incumbent, Raymond Ratzlaff, by eight votes to win the seat for his party.

After the election, Lougheed appointed Warrack Minister of Lands and Forests. In the 1975 general election, he defeated three other candidates. After the election, Lougheed moved Warrack to the Ministry of Utilities and Telephones. He retired from provincial politics at dissolution of the Assembly in 1979.

== Later life and death ==
After leaving politics, Warrack became a professor at the University of Alberta with the Department of Marketing, Business Economics and Law in the Faculty of Business. He was also the associate dean of the Master of Public Management Program and vice-president of Administration. He later held a position on the National Research Council Canada.

Warrack died on July 24, 2026, at the age of 89.
