= Calgary Centre (provincial electoral district) =

Defunct provincial electoral district in Alberta, Canada

Coordinates: 51.048°N 114.072°W

Alberta electoral district

Defunct provincial electoral district
- Legislature: Legislative Assembly of Alberta
- District created: 1959
- District abolished: 1970
- First contested: 1959
- Last contested: 1967

Calgary Centre was a provincial electoral district in Alberta, Canada, mandated to return a single member to the Legislative Assembly of Alberta using the first past the post method of voting from 1959 to 1971.

== History ==
The original Centre Calgary district was first created during a brief period when the Calgary riding was split three ways. The other two districts were Calgary South and Calgary North.

The second incarnation was during the re-distribution of 1959 when Alberta moved from Single Transferable Vote to First Past the Post.

The riding was last contested in the 1967 Alberta general election, after which the Alberta Legislature passed the 1970 An Act to amend The Election Act and The Legislative Assembly Act to redraw provincial electoral districts. Calgary Centre and Calgary Victoria Park were split between Calgary-Buffalo, Calgary-Mountain View, Calgary-Bow, Calgary-Millican and Calgary-North Hill.

The riding covered the Downtown Calgary.

=== 1959 redistribution ===
The historic 1959 redistribution of the provincial ridings of Calgary and Edmonton marked the transition back to First Past the Post. From 1926 to 1959 Calgary and Edmonton, elected members with Single Transferable Vote. The rest of the province had an option of how to count ballots to elect members in single seat ridings.

The redistribution created seven ridings in Calgary, two of those still exist today. Calgary and Edmonton were becoming too large to be a single riding.

The other six ridings were Calgary Bowness, Calgary West, Calgary Glenmore, Calgary North, Calgary North East, Calgary South East.

=== Members of the Legislative Assembly (MLAs) ===
Members of the Legislative Assembly for Calgary Centre
Assembly	Years	Member	Party
See Calgary electoral district from 1921-1959
14th	1959–1963	Frederick C. Colborne	Social Credit
15th	1963–1967	Frederick C. Colborne	Social Credit
16th	1967–1971	Frederick C. Colborne	Social Credit
See Calgary-West electoral district from 1971-Present, Calgary-Millican electoral district from 1971-1993 and Calgary-Buffalo electoral district from 1971-Present

== Election results ==
=== 1959 ===
1959 Alberta general election
Party	Candidate	Votes	%	±%
Social Credit	Fred C. Colborne	4,824	53.79%	0.00%
Progressive Conservative	Runo Berglund	2,642	29.46%	0.00%
Liberal	Gordan Arnell	1,154	12.87%	0.00%
Co-operative Commonwealth	Grant McHardy	349	3.89%	0.00%
Total		8,969	–	–
Rejected, spoiled and declined		16	–	–
Eligible electors / turnout		16,884	53.22%	–
Source(s) Source: "Calgary-Centre Official Results 1959 Alberta general election". Alberta Heritage Community Foundation.

=== 1963 ===
1963 Alberta general election
Party	Candidate	Votes	%	±%
Social Credit	Fred C. Colborne	4,395	61.63%	7.85%
Liberal	E. Virgil Anderson	1,878	26.34%	13.47%
New Democratic	Mrs. Melba Cochlan	757	10.62%	–
Communist	Dave Raichman	101	1.42%	–
Total		7,131	–	–
Rejected, spoiled and declined		48	–	–
Eligible electors / turnout		17,567	40.87%	–
Social Credit hold		Swing		5.48%
Source(s) Source: "Calgary-Centre Official Results 1963 Alberta general election". Alberta Heritage Community Foundation.

=== 1967 ===
1967 Alberta general election
Party	Candidate	Votes	%	±%
Social Credit	Fred C. Colborne	3,873	40.85%	-20.78%
Progressive Conservative	Chuck Cook	3,359	35.43%	–
Liberal	John Starchuk	1,275	13.45%	-12.89%
New Democratic	Mrs. Margaret Hanley	973	10.26%	-0.35%
Total		9,480	–	–
Rejected, spoiled and declined		90	–	–
Eligible electors / turnout		17,554	54.52%	–
Social Credit hold		Swing		-14.94%
Source(s) Source: "Calgary-Centre Official Results 1967 Alberta general election". Alberta Heritage Community Foundation.

== See also ==
- List of Alberta provincial electoral districts
- Canadian provincial electoral districts
