= Raymond Ratzlaff =

Canadian politician (1931–2019)

Raymond Samuel Ratzlaff

Member of the Legislative Assembly of Alberta
- In office May 23, 1967 – August 30, 1971
- Preceded by: Roy Davidson
- Succeeded by: Allan Warrack
- Constituency: Three Hills

Minister of Industry and Tourism
- In office May 27, 1969 – September 10, 1971
- Premier: Harry Strom
- Preceded by: Allen Patrick
- Succeeded by: Fred Peacock; Robert Dowling

Personal details
- Born: April 10, 1931 Linden, Alberta
- Died: February 1, 2019 (aged 87) Alberta, Canada
- Party: Social Credit
- Occupation: politician

Raymond Samuel Ratzlaff (April 10, 1931 – February 1, 2019) was a politician from Alberta, Canada. He served in the Legislative Assembly of Alberta from 1967 to 1971 as a member of the Social Credit caucus in government. He served in the cabinet of Premier Harry Strom from 1969 to 1971.

== Political career ==
Ratzlaff first ran for a seat to the Alberta Legislature in the 1967 general election, as a Social Credit candidate in the electoral district of Three Hills. He defeated three other candidates with over half the popular vote to hold the seat for his party.

On May 27, 1969 Ratzlaff was appointed Minister of Industry and Tourism by Premier Harry Strom. In the 1971 general election he was defeated by Progressive Conservative candidate Allan Warrack by just eight votes. He died in 2019 at the age of 87.
