= Robert A. Simpson =

Canadian politician

Robert Archibald Simpson (April 5, 1910 – September 24, 1998) was a politician from Alberta, Canada. He was born in Toronto.

== Political career ==
Simpson ran for a seat in the House of Commons of Canada in the 1962 federal election, as a Social Credit candidate in the electoral district of Calgary North. He finished second to incumbent Douglas Scott Harkness by roughly 6,000 votes. Simpson challenged Harkness again a year later and lost by a wider margin.

Shortly after his second defeat for federal office, Simpson ran for the Legislative Assembly of Alberta in the 1963 general election, as a Social Credit candidate in Calgary North. He defeated three other candidates by a wide margin. In the 1967 general election, he defeated Henry Beaumont of the Progressive Conservatives by about 400 votes.

In the 1971 Alberta general election, Calgary North had been abolished and Simpson sought re-election in the new riding of Calgary North Hill. He was defeated by 67 votes by challenger Roy Farran of the Progressive Conservatives. Simpson attempted to regain the seat from Farran in the 1975 general election, but was defeated in a landslide.

He was elected to the Calgary city council, serving from 1971 to 1980.

Legislative Assembly of Alberta
Preceded by Rose Wilkinson	MLA Calgary North; 1963–1971	Succeeded by District Abolished
