= Leslie Young (politician) =

Canadian politician (born 1934)

Leslie Gordon "Les" Young

Member of the Legislative Assembly of Alberta
- In office 1971–1989
- Preceded by: John Horan
- Succeeded by: John McInnis
- Constituency: Edmonton Jasper Place

Minister of Labour
- In office March 1979 – May 1986
- Preceded by: Neil Stanley Crawford
- Succeeded by: Ian Reid

Minister of Technology, Research, and Telecommunications
- In office May 1986 – March 1989
- Preceded by: David Thomas King
- Succeeded by: Fred Stewart

Personal details
- Born: August 19, 1934 (age 91)
- Party: Progressive Conservative

Leslie Gordon Young (born August 19, 1934) is a retired Canadian politician from Alberta. He served in the Legislative Assembly of Alberta from 1971 to 1989, and served in the Executive Council of Alberta from 1979 to 1989.

== Political career ==
Young was first elected to the Alberta Legislature in the 1971 general election. He defeated three other candidates in the electoral district of Edmonton-Jasper for the Progressive Conservative party, who also formed government that year.

In the 1975 Alberta general election, Young's popular vote increased and he won his electoral district in a landslide. In the 1979 general election, he won his district by a slightly smaller margin of victory compared to his 1975 win.

In 1979 Premier Peter Lougheed appointed Young Minister of Labour. In the 1982 general election he won the highest plurality of his career. When Don Getty became Premier in 1985, Young remained Minister of Labour in the new cabinet.

In the 1986 general election, Young finished just 71 votes ahead of Vair Clendenning of the New Democrats.

Young was defeated in the 1989 general election by John McInnis of the New Democrats.
