= Lee Leavitt =

Canadian politician

Lorne Lee Leavitt

Member of the Legislative Assembly of Alberta
- In office August 5, 1952 – June 29, 1955
- Preceded by: Arthur Wray
- Succeeded by: Frank Gainer
- Constituency: Banff-Cochrane
- In office June 17, 1963 – August 30, 1971
- Preceded by: New District
- Succeeded by: District Abolished
- Constituency: Calgary Queens Park

Personal details
- Born: December 6, 1906 Cardston, Alberta
- Died: January 13, 1984 (aged 77)
- Party: Social Credit
- Occupation: teacher, politician

Lorne Lee Leavitt (December 6, 1906 – January 13, 1984) was a teacher and a provincial politician from Alberta, Canada. He served as a member of the Legislative Assembly of Alberta from 1952 to 1955 and 1963 to 1971, sitting both times with the governing Social Credit Party of Alberta caucus.

== Political career ==
Leavitt first ran to be a member of the legislature in the 1952 Alberta general election. He ran as a Social Credit candidate in the electoral district of Banff-Cochrane. Leavitt easily won the district, defeating two other candidates, including Independent Social Credit incumbent Arthur Wray.

Leavitt ran for a second term in the 1955 Alberta general election. He was defeated in a hotly contested fight by Frank Gainer. Gainer ran as a Coalition candidate as both the Liberals and the Progressive Conservatives nominated him.

Leavitt would try and run for a seat to the House of Commons of Canada in the electoral district of Calgary North as a candidate for federal Social Credit in the 1958 Canadian federal election. He finished a very distant second place to incumbent Progressive Conservative Douglas Harkness.

Leavitt ran again provincially for Social Credit in the 1963 Alberta general election in the electoral district of Calgary Queens Park. He won the district with just under half the popular vote defeating five candidates, including future PC MLA Roy Farran. He stood for his third term in office in the 1967 Alberta general election. His margin of victory dropped as he only took 42% of the vote. However, he defeated future PC MLA Eric Musgreave and two other candidates. Leavitt retired from provincial politics at dissolution of the assembly when the 1971 Alberta general election was called.
