= Edward Benoit =

Canadian politician

Edward Philip Benoit (November 26, 1918 – January 22, 1991) was a former provincial level politician. He served as a member of the Alberta Legislature from 1963 until 1975. He was born in Calgary.

== Political career ==
Benoit was first elected to the Legislative Assembly of Alberta in the 1963 Alberta general election. He won the former riding of Okotoks-High River holding it for the Social Credit party. In that election he won a comfortable plurality of almost seven hundred votes over Progressive Conservative candidate Samuel Brown and two other candidates. He was re-elected to his second term in office in the 1967 Alberta general election barely retaining his seat as he squeaked out a two hundred vote win in a hotly contested race against Progressive Conservative Thomas Hughes and two other candidates.

In 1971 Okotoks-High River was abolished and replaced by the new Highwood electoral district. Benoit ran for his third term in that new riding and won another tight race defeating Eldon Couey of the Progressive Conservatives and another candidate. Benoit was defeated by George Wolstenholme in his bid for a fourth term in office in the 1975 Alberta general election.

== Late life ==
Benoit died on January 22, 1991.

Legislative Assembly of Alberta
Preceded by Ernest George Hansell	MLA Okotoks-High River; 1963–1971	Succeeded by District Abolished
Preceded by New District	MLA Highwood; 1971–1975	Succeeded by George Wolstenholme
