= Three Hills (provincial electoral district) =

Defunct provincial electoral district in Alberta, Canada

Alberta electoral district

Defunct provincial electoral district
- Legislature: Legislative Assembly of Alberta
- District created: 1963
- District abolished: 1993
- First contested: 1963
- Last contested: 1989

Three Hills was a provincial electoral district in Alberta, Canada, mandated to return a single member to the Legislative Assembly of Alberta using the first past the post method of voting from 1963 to 1993.

== History ==
The Three Hills electoral district was created in the 1963 electoral boundary re-distribution from the Didsbury, Gleichen, and Olds electoral districts. It was abolished in 1993 and merged with Drumheller to form Three Hills-Airdrie, which would last only one session before redistribution.

Three Hills is named for the town of Three Hills, Alberta.

=== Members of the Legislative Assembly (MLAs) ===
Members of the Legislative Assembly for Three Hills
Assembly	Years	Member	Party
See Didsbury electoral district from 1909-1963, Gleichen electoral district from 1905-1963 and Olds electoral district from 1909-1963
15th	1963–1964	Petrie Meston	Social Credit
15th	1964–1967	Roy Davidson	Social Credit
16th	1967–1971	Raymond Ratzlaff	Social Credit
17th	1971–1975	Allan Alexander Warrack	Progressive Conservative
18th	1975–1979	Allan Alexander Warrack	Progressive Conservative
19th	1979–1982	Connie Osterman	Progressive Conservative
20th	1982–1986	Connie Osterman	Progressive Conservative
21st	1986–1989	Connie Osterman	Progressive Conservative
22nd	1989–1992	Connie Osterman	Progressive Conservative
22nd	1992–1993	Don MacDonald	Liberal
See Three Hills-Airdrie electoral district from 1993-1997

== Electoral history ==
=== 1963 ===
1963 Alberta general election
Party	Candidate	Votes	%	±%
Social Credit	Petrie Meston	3,385	63.04%	–
Liberal	James A. Lore	1,728	32.18%	–
New Democratic	John F. Kennan	257	4.79%	–
Total		5,370	–	–
Rejected, spoiled and declined		29	–	–
Eligible electors / turnout		7,887	68.45%	–
Social Credit pickup new district.				
Source(s) Source: "Three Hills Official Results 1963 Alberta general election". Alberta Heritage Community Foundation.

=== 1967 ===
1967 Alberta general election
Party	Candidate	Votes	%	±%
Social Credit	Raymond Ratzlaff	2,762	50.59%	-12.45%
Liberal	James A. Lore	1,317	24.12%	-8.06%
Progressive Conservative	Gordon Leslie	1,113	20.38%	–
New Democratic	George E. Pieper	268	4.91%	0.12%
Total		5,460	–	–
Rejected, spoiled and declined		12	–	–
Eligible electors / turnout		7,692	71.14%	–
Social Credit hold		Swing		-2.20%
Source(s) Source: "Three Hills Official Results 1967 Alberta general election". Alberta Heritage Community Foundation.

=== 1971 ===
1971 Alberta general election
Party	Candidate	Votes	%	±%
Progressive Conservative	Allan Alexander Warrack	2,978	48.28%	27.90%
Social Credit	Raymond Ratzlaff	2,970	48.15%	-2.43%
New Democratic	K. Robert Friesen	220	3.57%	-1.34%
Total		6,168	–	–
Rejected, spoiled and declined		29	–	–
Eligible electors / turnout		8,031	77.16%	–
Progressive Conservative gain from Social Credit		Swing		-13.17%
Source(s) Source: "Three Hills Official Results 1971 Alberta general election". Alberta Heritage Community Foundation.

=== 1975 ===
1975 Alberta general election
Party	Candidate	Votes	%	±%
Progressive Conservative	Allan Alexander Warrack	4,268	69.76%	21.48%
Social Credit	Bob Sommerville	1,406	22.98%	-25.17%
Liberal	Wes Combs	252	4.12%	–
New Democratic	Bruce Potter	192	3.14%	-0.43%
Total		6,118	–	–
Rejected, spoiled and declined		9	–	–
Eligible electors / turnout		8,705	70.38%	–
Progressive Conservative hold		Swing		23.33%
Source(s) Source: "Three Hills Official Results 1975 Alberta general election". Alberta Heritage Community Foundation.

=== 1979 ===
1979 Alberta general election
Party	Candidate	Votes	%	±%
Progressive Conservative	Connie Osterman	4,401	59.42%	-10.34%
Social Credit	Henry Goerzen	2,660	35.91%	12.93%
New Democratic	Hugh Sommerville	222	3.00%	-0.14%
Liberal	Ward Sykes	124	1.67%	-2.44%
Total		7,407	–	–
Rejected, spoiled and declined		N/A	–	–
Eligible electors / turnout		10,998	67.35%	–
Progressive Conservative hold		Swing		-11.64%
Source(s) Source: "Three Hills Official Results 1979 Alberta general election". Alberta Heritage Community Foundation.

=== 1982 ===
1982 Alberta general election
Party	Candidate	Votes	%	±%
Progressive Conservative	Connie Osterman	8,693	77.68%	18.26%
Western Canada Concept	Vern Meek	1,949	17.42%	–
New Democratic	James B. Schleppe	549	4.91%	1.91%
Total		1,1191	–	–
Rejected, spoiled and declined		30	–	–
Eligible electors / turnout		15,884	70.64%	–
Progressive Conservative hold		Swing		18.38%
Source(s) Source: "Three Hills Official Results 1982 Alberta general election". Alberta Heritage Community Foundation.

=== 1986 ===
1986 Alberta general election
Party	Candidate	Votes	%	±%
Progressive Conservative	Connie Osterman	5,924	83.52%	5.84%
New Democratic	Vernal Poole	1,169	16.48%	11.58%
Total		7,093	–	–
Rejected, spoiled and declined		27	–	–
Eligible electors / turnout		14,547	48.94%	–
Progressive Conservative hold		Swing		3.39%
Source(s) Source: "Three Hills Official Results 1986 Alberta general election". Alberta Heritage Community Foundation.

=== 1989 ===
1989 Alberta general election
Party	Candidate	Votes	%	±%
Progressive Conservative	Connie Osterman	4,986	56.51%	-27.01%
New Democratic	Fred Mertz	1,851	20.98%	4.50%
Liberal	Peter Burch	1,245	14.11%	–
Social Credit	Poul Wesch	741	8.40%	–
Total		8,823	–	–
Rejected, spoiled and declined		9	–	–
Eligible electors / turnout		15,454	57.15%	–
Progressive Conservative hold		Swing		-15.75%
Source(s) Source: "Three Hills Official Results 1989 Alberta general election". Alberta Heritage Community Foundation.

=== 1992 by-election ===
Alberta provincial by-election, October 26, 1992 following the resignation of Connie Osterman on May 5, 1992
Party	Candidate	Votes	%	±%
Liberal	Don MacDonald	4,790	46.34%	32.23%
Progressive Conservative	Brad Oneil	2,314	22.39%	-34.12%
New Democratic	Gordon G. Twigg	1,270	12.28%	-8.70%
Social Credit	Peter Smits	583	5.64%	-2.76%
Alliance	Gordon A. Shenton	566	5.47%	–
Confederation of Regions	Ray Young	467	4.52%	–
Independent	Dennis Clark	244	2.36%	–
Green	Danny O'Connor	103	1.00%	–
Total		10,337	–	–
Rejected, spoiled and declined		34	–	–
Eligible electors / turnout		17,736	58.47%	–
Liberal gain		Swing		
Source(s) Alberta. Chief Electoral Officer (1992). The report of the Chief Electoral Officer on the Three Hills by-election held Monday, October 26, 1992 (Report). Edmonton: Alberta Legislative Assembly, Office of the Chief Electoral Officer.

== See also ==
- List of Alberta provincial electoral districts
- Canadian provincial electoral districts
