= Calgary-North =

Provincial electoral district in Alberta, Canada

Coordinates: 51.128°N 114.096°W

Alberta electoral district
- Calgary-North within the city of Calgary (2017 boundaries).

Provincial electoral district
- Legislature: Legislative Assembly of Alberta
MLA
Muhammad Yaseen
United Conservative
- District created: 1957
- District abolished: 1971
- District re-created: 2017
- First contested: 1959, 2019
- Last contested: 1967, 2023

Demographics
- Population (2016): 39,120
- Area (km²): 21.2
- Pop. density (per km²): 1,845.3

Calgary-North (previously styled Calgary North) is a single member electoral district in Calgary, Alberta. The electoral district existed from 1959 to 1971, and was re-established for the 2019 Alberta general election.

== Boundary history ==
=== 1959 Redistribution ===
The Alberta government decided to return to using the first-past-the-post system of voting from Single Transferable Vote for the 1959 general election. The province redistributed the Calgary and Edmonton super-ridings and standardized the voting system across the province.

Calgary North was one of the six electoral districts created that year in Calgary. The others were Calgary Bowness, Calgary Centre, Calgary West (provincial electoral district), Calgary Glenmore, Calgary North East, and Calgary South East (provincial electoral district). The riding was abolished in 1971, split up between Calgary-McKnight, Calgary-North Hill and Calgary-Mountain View.

Calgary North 1957 Boundaries
Bordering Districts
North	East	West	South
Banff-Cochrane	Calgary-North East	Calgary-Bowness, Calgary-West-	Calgary-Centre
Legal description from the Statutes of Alberta 1957, An Act to amend The Legislative Assembly Act.
riding map goes here		map in relation to other districts in Calgary goes here	
"Electoral Division of Calgary-North, the boundary whereof is as follows: Commencing at the intersection of the centre line of Centre Street in the City of Calgary with the left bank of the Bow River; thence in a generally westerly direction along the said left bank to the west limit of Fourteenth Street North West in the City of Calgary; thence northerly along the west limit of Fourteenth Street North West of the fifth meridian; thence easterly along the north boundaries of sections 9 and 10 in the said township; thence westerly along the north boundary of section 34, township 24 range 1, west of the fifth meridian to the centre line of Centre Street aforesaid; thence southerly along the centre line of Centre Street to the point of commencement.
Note: Boundaries came into force in 1959.

Calgary-North 1961 Boundaries
Bordering Districts
North	East	West	South
Banff-Cochrane	Calgary-East-	Calgary-Queens Park	Calgary-Centre
Legal description from the Statutes of Alberta 1961, An Act to amend The Legislative Assembly Act and The Election Act.
riding map goes here		map in relation to other districts in Calgary goes here	
"Electoral Division of Calgary-North, the boundary whereof is as follows: Commencing at the north-east corner of section 10, township 25, range 1, west of the 5th meridian to the centre line of the Calgary-Edmonton Branch of the Canadian Pacific Railway; thence in a general south-easterly direction along the said centre line to the centre line of the Edmonton Trail; thence in a general south-westerly and southerly direction along the said centre line to the centre line of the 4th street bridge; thence in a general south-westerly direction along the said centre line to the right bank of the Bow River; thence upstream along the said right bank to the centre line of the Louise Bridge; thence in a general north-westerly direction along the said centre line to the centre line of 10th street north west; thence in ageneral northerly direction along the said centre line to the centre line of 16th avenue north west; thence easterly along the said centrea line to the centre line of 4th street north west; thence northerly along the said centre line to the westerly production of the centre line of Blackthorn Road; thence westerly along the said production to the east boundary of section 9, township 25, range 1 west of the 5th meridian, to the north-east corner of said section; thence easterly along the north boundary of section 10, township 25, range 1, west of the 5th meridian, to the point of commencement.
Note: Boundaries lasted until the district was abolished in 1971.

=== 2017 redistribution ===
The riding was re-created (with the current hyphenated name) from Calgary-Mackay-Nose Hill and Calgary-Northern Hills.

== Representation history ==
Members of the Legislative Assembly for Calgary-North
Assembly	Years	Member	Party
See Calgary 1921-1959
14th	1959–1963	Rose Wilkinson	Social Credit
15th	1963–1967	Robert Simpson	Social Credit
16th	1967–1971	Robert Simpson	Social Credit
See Calgary-McKnight, Calgary-North Hill and Calgary-Mountain View after 1971
See Calgary-Mackay-Nose Hill and Calgary- Northern Hills before 2019
30th	2019–2023	Muhammad Yaseen	United Conservative
31st	2023–present	Muhammad Yaseen	United Conservative

The first election held in 1959 was contested by two incumbents from the Calgary electoral district facing each other, Rose Wilkinson and Grant MacEwan, plus former MLA Aylmer Liesemer who had been defeated in the 1955 Alberta general election. Wilkinson would win and serve her final term representing the district.

The second election held in 1963 would see Social Credit keep the seat under MLA Robert Simpson. He would win a second term in 1967 and hold the district until it was abolished in 1971.

== Election results ==
=== 2023 ===
2023 Alberta general election
Party	Candidate	Votes	%	±%
United Conservative	Muhammad Yaseen	7,927	50.41	-4.82
New Democratic	Rajesh Angral	7,798	49.59	+18.51
Total		15,725	99.28	–
Rejected and declined		114	0.72	
Turnout		15,839	56.81	
Eligible electors		27,882		
United Conservative hold		Swing		-11.67
Source(s) Source: Elections Alberta

=== 2010s ===
2019 Alberta general election
Party	Candidate	Votes	%	±%
United Conservative	Muhammad Yaseen	8,409	55.2	-1.1
New Democratic	Kelly Mandryk	4,731	31.1	-6.6
Alberta Party	Gary Arora	1,591	10.5	N/A
Liberal	Salma Hag	365	2.4	-3.4
Alberta Independence	Brad Hopkins	128	0.8	N/A
Total valid votes		15,224		
Rejected, spoiled, and declined				
Registered electors		25,331		
Turnout		60.1		

2015 Alberta general election redistributed results
New Democratic	3,597	37.70%
Progressive Conservative	2,972	31.15%
Wildrose	2,397	25.13%
Liberal	551	5.78%
Others	23	0.24%

=== 1950s and 60s ===
1967 Alberta general election
Party	Candidate	Votes	%	±%
Social Credit	Robert A. Simpson	4,308	43.00%	-13.94%
Progressive Conservative	Henry M. Beaumont	3,915	39.08%	13.43%
New Democratic	Walter H. Siewert	1,157	11.55%	3.73%
Liberal	Charles W. Loughridge	638	6.37%	-3.22%
Total		10,018	–	–
Rejected, spoiled and declined		62	–	–
Eligible electors / Turnout		16,143	62.44%	9.96%
Social Credit hold		Swing		-13.68%
Source(s) Source: "Calgary-North Official Results 1967 Alberta general election". Alberta Heritage Community Foundation.

1963 Alberta general election
Party	Candidate	Votes	%	±%
Social Credit	Robert A. Simpson	4,713	56.94%	5.12%
Progressive Conservative	Larry B. Nugent	2,123	25.65%	-0.71%
Liberal	Robert F. Goss	794	9.59%	-9.32%
New Democratic	Steven P. Galan	647	7.82%	4.91%
Total		8,277	–	–
Rejected, spoiled and declined		18	–	–
Eligible electors / Turnout		15,804	52.49%	-10.14%
Social Credit hold		Swing		2.92%
Source(s) Source: "Calgary-North Official Results 1963 Alberta general election". Alberta Heritage Community Foundation.

1959 Alberta general election
Party	Candidate	Votes	%	±%
Social Credit	Rose Wilkinson	6,655	51.82%	–
Progressive Conservative	James David Macdonald	3,385	26.36%	–
Liberal	Grant MacEwan	2,429	18.91%	–
Co-operative Commonwealth	Aylmer John Eggert Liesemer	374	2.91%	–
Total		12,843	–	–
Rejected, spoiled and declined		34	–	–
Eligible electors / Turnout		20,562	62.63%	–
Social Credit pickup new district.				
Source(s) Source: "Calgary-North Official Results 1959 Alberta general election". Alberta Heritage Community Foundation.

== See also ==
- List of Alberta provincial electoral districts
- Canadian provincial electoral districts
