= Albert Strohschein =

Canadian politician

Albert William Strohschein

Member of the Legislative Assembly of Alberta
- In office June 17, 1963 – August 30, 1971
- Preceded by: John Wingblade
- Succeeded by: District Abolished
- Constituency: Wetaskiwin

Personal details
- Born: January 5, 1905 Wetaskiwin, Alberta, Canada
- Died: February 27, 1985 (aged 80)
- Party: Social Credit
- Occupation: politician

Albert William Strohschein (January 5, 1905 – February 27, 1985) was a provincial politician from Alberta, Canada. He served as a member of the Legislative Assembly of Alberta from 1963 to 1971 sitting with the Social Credit caucus in government.

== Political career ==
Strohschein ran for a seat to the Alberta Legislature in the 1963 Alberta general election as the Social Credit candidate in the electoral district of Wetaskiwin. He won a large majority to hold the seat easily for his party.

Strohschein ran for a second term in the 1967 Alberta general election. He faced a strong challenge from Progressive Conservative candidate Dallas Schmidt but was able to hang on to his seat. He retired from the Assembly at dissolution in 1971.
