= Randolph McKinnon =

Canadian politician

Member of the Legislative Assembly of Alberta
- In office June 18, 1959 – May 23, 1967
- Preceded by: New District
- Succeeded by: Don Getty
- Constituency: Strathcona West

Minister of Education
- In office July 31, 1964 – June 29, 1967
- Premier: Ernest Manning
- Preceded by: Anders Aalborg
- Succeeded by: Raymond Reierson

Personal details
- Born: Randolph Hugh McKinnon; July 22, 1917 Delburne, Alberta
- Died: June 10, 2006 (aged 88)
- Party: Social Credit
- Occupation: politician

Randolph Hugh McKinnon (July 22, 1917 – c. June 10, 2006) was a provincial politician from Alberta, Canada. He served as a member of the Legislative Assembly of Alberta from 1959 to 1967 sitting with the Social Credit caucus in government. During his time in office McKinnon served as a cabinet minister in the government of Premier Ernest Manning from 1964 to 1967.

== Political career ==
McKinnon ran for a seat to the Alberta Legislature in the new electoral district of Strathcona West as a candidate for the Social Credit party in the 1959 Alberta general election. He defeated three other candidates in a hotly contested race with less than half the popular vote to pick up the seat for his party.

McKinnon ran for a second term in the 1963 Alberta general election. He won a higher popular vote defeating three other candidates with a sizable majority.

After the election Premier Ernest Manning appointed McKinnon to the Executive Council of Alberta on July 31, 1964, giving him the Education portfolio. McKinnon ran for a third term in the 1967 Alberta general election, but was defeated finishing a close second out of four candidates. He lost to Progressive Conservative candidate Don Getty.
