= Roy Ells =

Canadian politician

Roy Burke Ells

Member of the Legislative Assembly of Alberta
- In office June 18, 1959 – August 30, 1971
- Preceded by: Joseph Desfosses
- Succeeded by: District abolished
- Constituency: Grouard

Personal details
- Born: May 14, 1914 Rosetown, Saskatchewan
- Died: February 22, 1979 (aged 64) San Diego, California
- Party: Social Credit
- Spouse: Verna Ells
- Occupation: Politician and Businessman

Roy Burke Ells (May 14, 1914 – February 22, 1979) was a provincial politician from Alberta, Canada. He served as a member of the Legislative Assembly of Alberta from 1959 to 1971 sitting with the Social Credit caucus in government.

== Political career ==
Ells ran for a seat to the Alberta Legislature in the 1959 Alberta general election. He ran as the Social Credit candidate in the electoral district of Grouard. Ells defeated two other candidates with a landslide majority to pick the seat up for his party.

Ells ran for a second term in the 1963 Alberta general election. He defeated two candidates winning a slightly larger majority to hold his seat.

Ells ran for a third term in the 1967 Alberta general election. He faced a strong challenge from NDP candidate Stan Daniels, but managed to hold his seat winning just over half the popular vote.

Ells retired from the legislature in 1971.
