= Harry Leinweber =

Canadian politician

Harry C. Leinweber

Member of the Legislative Assembly of Alberta
- In office January 19, 1961 – 1971
- Preceded by: Elizabeth Robinson
- Succeeded by: William Wyse
- Constituency: Medicine Hat

Personal details
- Born: January 6, 1907 Saratov, Russian Empire
- Died: March 19, 1992 (aged 85) Medicine Hat, Alberta
- Party: Social Credit
- Occupation: Insurance Underwriter

Harry C. Leinweber (January 6, 1907 – March 19, 1992) was a politician from Alberta, Canada. He served in the Legislative Assembly of Alberta from 1961 to 1971 as a member of the Social Credit Party.

== Political career ==
Leinweber served as a municipal Alderman for the city of Medicine Hat from 1944 to 1950. He ran for mayor twice but was unsuccessful.

Leinweber first ran for a seat to the Alberta legislature in a by-election held on January 19, 1961, in the electoral district of Medicine Hat. He defeated three other candidates with just under half the popular vote to hold the district for Social Credit.

In the 1963 general election Leinweber was re-elected with over 51% of the popular vote over three other candidates.

In the 1967 general election Leinweber won the district with just 40% of the popular vote over future MLA Jim Horsman. He retired from the Legislature at dissolution in 1971.
