= William Patterson (Alberta politician) =

Canadian politician (1908-1996)

Member of the Legislative Assembly of Alberta
- In office June 18, 1959 – May 23, 1967
- Preceded by: John Mills
- Succeeded by: Hugh Horner
- Constituency: Lac Ste. Anne

Personal details
- Born: December 11, 1908
- Died: February 13, 1996 (aged 87)
- Party: Social Credit
- Occupation: politician

William Patterson (December 11, 1908 – February 13, 1996) was a provincial politician from Alberta, Canada. He served as a member of the Legislative Assembly of Alberta from 1959 to 1967 sitting with the Social Credit caucus in government.

== Political career ==
Patterson ran for a seat to the Alberta Legislature in the electoral district of Lac Ste. Anne as a Social Credit candidate in the 1959 Alberta general election. He defeated incumbent Liberal MLA John Mills and two other candidates by a wide margin to pick up the district for his party and win his first term in office.

Patterson ran for a second term in office in the 1963 Alberta general election. He won a larger popular vote easily defeating two other candidates to return to office.

Patterson ran for a third term in office in the 1967 Alberta general election. He would be defeated by Progressive Conservative candidate Hugh Horner finishing second in the four way race.
