= Chester Sayers =

Canadian politician (1899–1985)

Chester Irving Sayers

Member of the Legislative Assembly of Alberta
- In office February 6, 1941 – August 30, 1971
- Preceded by: David B. Mullen
- Succeeded by: Gordon Stromberg
- Constituency: Camrose

Personal details
- Born: August 17, 1899 Woodbury County, Iowa
- Died: June 19, 1985 (aged 85)
- Party: Social Credit
- Occupation: politician

Chester Irving Sayers (August 17, 1899 – June 19, 1985) was a provincial politician from Alberta, Canada. He served as a member of the Legislative Assembly of Alberta from 1941 to 1971 sitting with the Social Credit caucus in government.

== Political career ==
Sayers ran for a seat to the Alberta Legislature as the Social Credit candidate in the electoral district of Camrose in a by-election held on February 6, 1941. He defeated Co-operative Commonwealth leader Chester Ronning in a hotly contested straight fight to hold the seat for his party. He ran for a second term in the 1944 Alberta general election. He faced former MLA William Chant and defeated him and another candidate with a large majority.

Sayers ran for a third term in office in the 1948 general election. He won decisively, increasing his popular vote.

Sayers ran for a fourth term in the 1952 general election. He lost a little ground in his popular vote, but still took the district with a comfortable plurality.

The 1955 general election would see Sayers nearly get defeated. He faced a strong challenge from Liberal candidate Ed Schnell whom he defeated on the third vote count to hold the district.

Sayers ran for his sixth term in the 1959 Alberta general election. He improved his popularity winning his largest popular vote to date. The opposition vote among the three other candidates shifted and collapsed in support giving Sayers a wide margin of victory.

The 1963 general election saw Sayers win the largest popular vote of his career. He defeated three other candidates to win his seventh term in office. He ran for his final term in the 1967 general election. He faced a hotly contested race amongst three other candidates. The opposition vote was divided and Sayers was returned with a large plurality.

Sayers retired from the Alberta Legislature at dissolution in 1971.
