= John Horan (politician) =

Canadian politician (1908–1971)

John William Horan

Member of the Legislative Assembly of Alberta
- In office June 17, 1963 – August 30, 1971
- Preceded by: New District
- Succeeded by: Leslie Young
- Constituency: Edmonton Jasper Place

Personal details
- Born: May 13, 1908 Sheffield, England
- Died: April 16, 1971 (aged 62)
- Party: Social Credit
- Occupation: politician

John William Horan (May 13, 1908 – April 16, 1971) was a politician from Alberta, Canada. He served in the Legislative Assembly of Alberta from 1963 to 1971 as a member of the Social Credit Party.

== Political career ==
Horan was first elected to the Alberta Legislature in the 1963 Alberta general election. He defeated Liberal candidate Keith Campbell and two other candidates in the electoral district of Edmonton Jasper Place. In the 1967 general election, he defeated Progressive Conservative candidate Gerard Amerongen and three other candidates to keep his seat.
