= Roy Davidson (politician) =

Canadian politician

Roy Lyle Davidson

Member of the Legislative Assembly of Alberta
- In office January 20, 1964 – May 23, 1967
- Preceded by: Petrie Meston
- Succeeded by: Raymond Ratzlaff
- Constituency: Three Hills

Personal details
- Born: February 15, 1906 Rygate Corner, Vermont, U.S.
- Died: April 25, 1999 (aged 93) Three Hills, Alberta
- Party: Social Credit
- Occupation: farmer and politician

Roy Lyle Davidson (February 15, 1906 – April 25, 1999) was a farmer and a provincial politician from Alberta, Canada. He served as a member of the Legislative Assembly of Alberta from 1964 to 1967 sitting with the governing Social Credit caucus.

== Political career ==
Davidson ran for a seat to the Alberta Legislature as a Social Credit candidate in a by-election held on January 20, 1964. Davidson won his party nomination in a convention held in Acme on December 24, 1963. He had been involved with the party as a volunteer for 20 years prior to seeking the nomination.

In the election Davidson won a hotly contested four-way race over Liberal leader David Hunter and two other candidates to hold the seat for his party.

Davidson did not run for a second term in office retiring at dissolution of the assembly in 1967.
