= Edmonton North (provincial electoral district) =

Defunct provincial electoral district in Alberta, Canada

Alberta electoral district

Defunct provincial electoral district
- Legislature: Legislative Assembly of Alberta
- District created: 1959
- District abolished: 1971
- First contested: 1959
- Last contested: 1967

Edmonton North was a provincial electoral district in Alberta, Canada, mandated to return a single member to the Legislative Assembly of Alberta using the first past the post method of voting from 1959 to 1971.

== History ==
The Edmonton North electoral district was in the 1959 redistribution which broke up the mega-ridings of Edmonton and Calgary, creating a number of single-member districts in their place. The district was redistributed into Edmonton-Calder and Edmonton-Kingsway electoral districts in 1971.

=== Members of the Legislative Assembly (MLAs) ===
Members of the Legislative Assembly for Edmonton North
Assembly	Years	Member	Party
See Edmonton electoral district from 1921-1959
14th	1959–1963	Ethel Sylvia Wilson	Social Credit
15th	1963–1967	Ethel Sylvia Wilson	Social Credit
16th	1967–1971	Ethel Sylvia Wilson	Social Credit
See Edmonton-Kingsway electoral district from 1971-1993 and Edmonton-Calder electoral district from 1971-1993

== Election results ==
=== 1959 ===
1959 Alberta general election
Party	Candidate	Votes	%	±%
Social Credit	Ethel Sylvia Wilson	4,831	53.28%	–
Progressive Conservative	Dr. John Verchomin	3,356	37.01%	–
Co-operative Commonwealth	Peter Gomuwka	881	9.72%	–
Total		9,068	–	–
Rejected, spoiled and declined		61	–	–
Eligible electors / turnout		16,256	56.16%	–
Social Credit pickup new district.				
Source(s) Source: "Edmonton North Official Results 1959 Alberta general election". Alberta Heritage Community Foundation.

=== 1963 ===
1963 Alberta general election
Party	Candidate	Votes	%	±%
Social Credit	Ethel Sylvia Wilson	4,655	52.38%	-0.90%
Liberal	Thomas O'Dwyer	2,489	28.01%	–
New Democratic	William H. Nash	1,743	19.61%	9.89%
Total		8,887	–	–
Rejected, spoiled and declined		35	–	–
Eligible electors / turnout		19,022	46.90%	–
Social Credit hold		Swing		4.05%
Source(s) Source: "Edmonton North Official Results 1963 Alberta general election". Alberta Heritage Community Foundation.

=== 1967 ===
1967 Alberta general election
Party	Candidate	Votes	%	±%
Social Credit	Ethel Sylvia Wilson	4,698	38.43%	-13.95%
Progressive Conservative	Tony Thibaudeau	3,461	28.31%	–
New Democratic	Gordon Wright	2,763	22.60%	2.99%
Liberal	L. John Corbiere	1,303	10.66%	-17.35%
Total		12,225	–	–
Rejected, spoiled and declined		69	–	–
Eligible electors / turnout		21,381	57.50%	–
Social Credit hold		Swing		-7.13%
Source(s) Source: "Edmonton North Official Results 1967 Alberta general election". Alberta Heritage Community Foundation.

== See also ==
- List of Alberta provincial electoral districts
- Canadian provincial electoral districts
