= Frank Gainer =

Canadian politician

Francis Leo Gainer

Member of the Legislative Assembly of Alberta
- In office June 29, 1955 – May 23, 1967
- Preceded by: Lee Leavitt
- Succeeded by: Clarence Copithorne
- Constituency: Banff-Cochrane

Personal details
- Born: February 12, 1888 Arthur, Ontario
- Died: March 10, 1975 (aged 87)
- Party: Coalition
- Occupation: politician

Francis Leo "Frank" "Pop" Gainer (February 12, 1888 – March 10, 1975) was a politician from Alberta, Canada. He served in the Legislative Assembly of Alberta from 1955 to 1967 as a member of a coalition of the Progressive Conservative and Liberal parties.

== Political career ==
Gainer first ran for a seat to the Alberta Legislature in the 1955 general election. He defeated Social Credit incumbent Lee Leavitt in the riding of Banff-Cochrane.

In the 1959 general election he defeated Social Credit candidate Robin Echlin in a straight fight by just 71 votes.

Due to Gainer's Coalition label, it was thought that he would be chosen leader of the official opposition after the 1959 election. There were only four members of the opposition elected to the legislature, each elected under a different banner. It was predicted that Gainer would join Progressive Conservative MLA Ernest Watkins and Liberal MLA Michael Maccagno to form a three-man opposition. No opposition leader was chosen during that legislature however.

In the 1963 general election he was returned to office with a slightly smaller share of the vote than in 1959 over two other candidates.

Gainer retired from the legislature at dissolution in 1967.
