= Edmonton North East (provincial electoral district) =

Defunct provincial electoral district in Alberta, Canada

Alberta electoral district

Defunct provincial electoral district
- Legislature: Legislative Assembly of Alberta
- District created: 1959
- District abolished: 1971
- First contested: 1959
- Last contested: 1967

Edmonton North East was a provincial electoral district in Alberta, Canada, mandated to return a single member to the Legislative Assembly of Alberta using the first past the post method of voting from 1959 to 1971.

== History ==
The Edmonton North East electoral district was in the 1959 redistribution which broke up the mega-ridings of Edmonton and Calgary, creating a number of single-member districts in their place. The district was redistributed into Edmonton-Beverly and Edmonton-Belmont electoral districts in 1971.

=== Members of the Legislative Assembly (MLAs) ===
Members of the Legislative Assembly for Edmonton North East
Assembly	Years	Member	Party
See Edmonton electoral district from 1921-1959
14th	1959–1963	Lou Heard	Social Credit
15th	1963–1967	Lou Heard	Social Credit
16th	1967–1971	Lou Heard	Social Credit
See Edmonton-Beverly electoral district from 1971-1993 and Edmonton-Belmont electoral district from 1971-1993

== Election results ==
=== 1959 ===
1959 Alberta general election
Party	Candidate	Votes	%	±%
Social Credit	Lou Heard	4,960	49.82%	–
Progressive Conservative	Allan Welsh	2,389	24.00%	–
Liberal	Louis Marchand	1,325	13.31%	–
Co-operative Commonwealth	Alex Goruk	1,063	10.68%	–
Labor–Progressive	W. Harasym	218	2.19%	–
Total		9,955	–	–
Rejected, spoiled and declined		62	–	–
Eligible electors / turnout		17,868	56.06%	–
Social Credit pickup new district.				
Source(s) Source: "Edmonton North East Official Results 1959 Alberta general election". Alberta Heritage Community Foundation.

=== 1963 ===
1963 Alberta general election
Party	Candidate	Votes	%	±%
Social Credit	Lou Heard	4,023	42.72%	-7.10%
New Democratic	Neil Reimer	2,589	27.49%	16.81%
Progressive Conservative	Allan Welsh	1,510	16.03%	-7.96%
Liberal	Ken McAuley	1,295	13.75%	0.44%
Total		9,417	–	–
Rejected, spoiled and declined		13	–	–
Eligible electors / turnout		19,640	48.01%	–
Social Credit hold		Swing		-5.30%
Source(s) Source: "Edmonton-North East Official Results 1963 Alberta general election". Alberta Heritage Community Foundation.

=== 1967 ===
1967 Alberta general election
Party	Candidate	Votes	%	±%
Social Credit	Lou Heard	5,052	35.18%	-7.54%
New Democratic	Ivor G. Dent	4,276	29.77%	2.28%
Progressive Conservative	Alan T. Cooke	3,616	25.18%	9.14%
Liberal	Peter Achtem	1,418	9.87%	-3.88%
Total		14,362	–	–
Rejected, spoiled and declined		66	–	–
Eligible electors / turnout		26,563	54.32%	–
Social Credit hold		Swing		-4.91%
Source(s) Source: "Edmonton-North East Official Results 1967 Alberta general election". Alberta Heritage Community Foundation.

== See also ==
- List of Alberta provincial electoral districts
- Canadian provincial electoral districts
