= 1963 Alberta general election =

- June 17, 1963

63 seats in the Legislative Assembly of Alberta 32 seats were needed for a majority
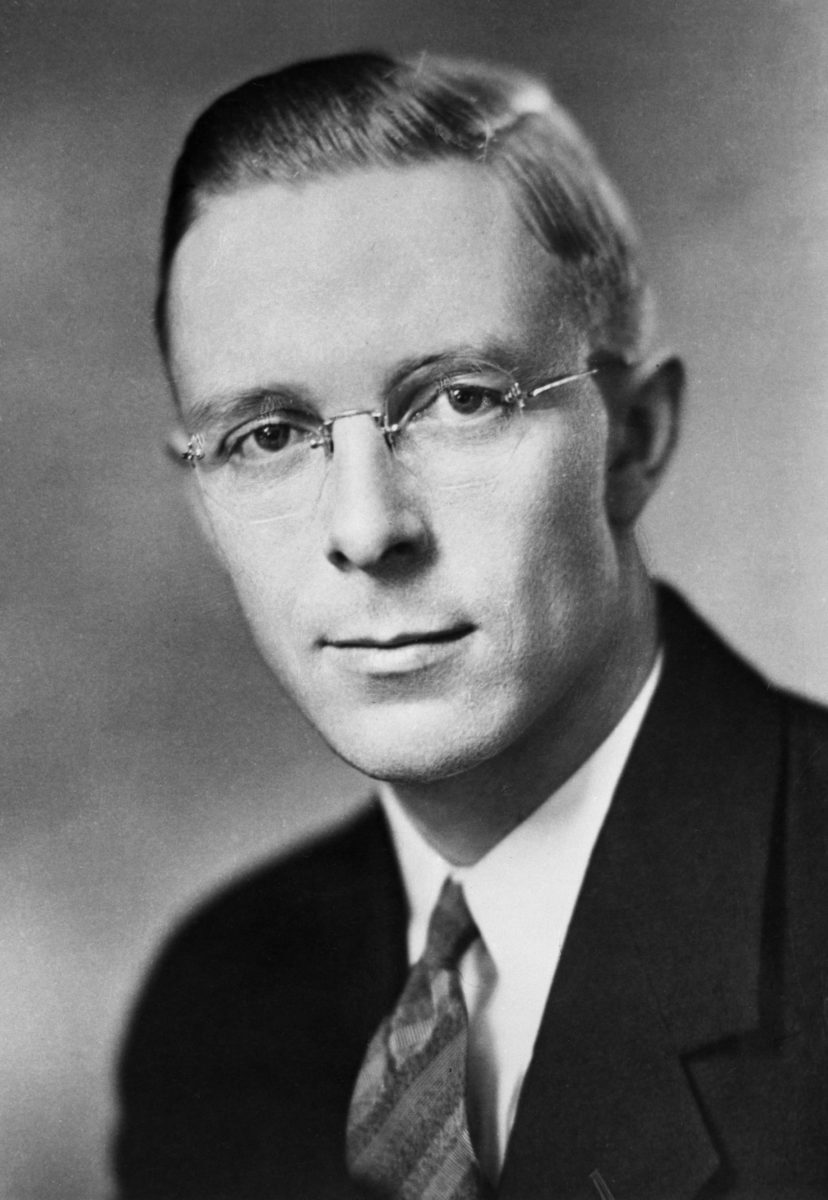
	Majority party	Minority party	Third party
		LIB	PC
Leader	Ernest Manning	Dave Hunter	Milt Harradence
Party	Social Credit	Liberal	Progressive Conservative
Leader since	May 31, 1943	January 14, 1962	1962
Leader's seat	Strathcona East	ran in Athabasca (lost)	ran in Calgary-West (lost)
Last election	61 seats, 55.7%	1 seat, 13.9%	1 seat, 23.9%
Seats before	60	1	1
Seats won	60	2	0
Seat change	Steady	▲1	▼1
Popular vote	221,107	79,709	51,278
Percentage	54.8%	19.8%	12.7%
Swing	▼0.9%	▲5.9%	▼11.2%
Premier before election
Ernest Manning
Social Credit
Premier after election
Ernest Manning
Social Credit

The 1963 Alberta general election was held on June 17, 1963, to elect members of the Legislative Assembly of Alberta.

The Social Credit Party, led by Ernest C. Manning, won its eighth consecutive term in government, winning roughly the same number of seats in the legislature and share of popular vote that it had in the 1959 election.

Some Social Credit supporters were so confident of their party's chances that they talked of winning "63 in '63", i.e., all 63 seats in the legislature in the 1963 election. They fell short of this goal, but still had an overwhelming majority, reducing the opposition to only three MLAs in total. Indeed, as a share of the overall seats available, this represented Social Credit's greatest victory in its 36-year reign.

Much of the opposition vote shifted away from the Progressive Conservative Party, now led by Milt Harradence, resulting in the party losing its sole seat.

The Liberal Party was a partial beneficiary of the PC Party's decline, but picked up only one additional seat, for a total of two, despite winning almost 20% of the popular vote.

New Democratic Party candidates received 9 per cent of the vote but no seats.

1963 was the last year in Alberta provincial politics when an MLA was acclaimed with the acclamation of Leonard Halmrast in Taber-Warner.

After the PCs won power, they would later speak of "79 in '79".

== Results ==

Party	Party Leader	# of candidates	Seats			Popular Vote		
Party	Party Leader	# of candidates	1959	Elected	% Change	#	%	% Change
Social Credit	Ernest C. Manning	63	61	60	−1.6%	221,107	54.81%	−0.88%
Liberal	Dave Hunter	55	1	2	+100%	79,709	19.76%	+5.88%
Coalition	Frank Gainer	1	1	1	-	2,179	0.54%	−0.01%
Progressive Conservative	Milt Harradence	33	1	-	−100%	51,278	12.71%	−11.17%
NDP^{1}	Neil Reimer	56	-	-	-	37,133	9.45%	+5.12%
Independent		3	-	-	-	3,966	0.98%	+0.10%
Independent Social Credit		6	1	-	−100%	3,178	0.79%	+0.21%
Alberta Unity Movement		3	*	-	*	2,223	0.55%	*
Progressive Conservative-Liberal	Ross Ellis	1	*	-	*	1,134	0.28%	*
Communist^{2}		4	-	-	-	527	0.13%	−0.08%
Total		225	65	63	−3.1%	403,444	100%	
Source: Elections Alberta

Notes:

^{1} The Cooperative Commonwealth Federation adopted the name "New Democratic Party" for the 1963 and subsequent elections.

^{2} The "Labour Progressive Party" returned to its original "Communist Party of Alberta" name for the 1963 and subsequent elections.

* Party did not nominate candidates in the previous election.

Popular vote
Social Credit	54.81%
Liberal	19.76%
PC	12.71%
New Democratic	9.45%
Coalition	0.54%
Others	2.73%

Seats summary
Social Credit	95.24%
Liberal	3.17%
Coalition	1.59%

== Results by riding ==
Electoral district	Candidates					Incumbent
Electoral district	Social Credit	Liberal	PC	NDP	Other	Incumbent
Alexandra	Anders O. Aalborg; 3,284; 66.30%			John C. Sandercock; 529; 10.68%	W. Slim Thorpe (Con-Lib); 1,134; 22.92%	Anders O. Aalborg
Athabasca	Antonio Aloisio; 2,241; 50.43%	Dave Hunter; 1,827; 41.11%		Judith Johnston; 223; 5.02%	Trygve Hansen (Comm.); 118; 2.66%	Antonio Aloisio
Banff-Cochrane	Victor Watson; 1,878; 42.68%			Jack Fraser; 331; 7.52%	Frank L. Gainer (Coal); 2,179; 49.66%	Francis Leo Gainer
Bonnyville	Romeo B. Lamothe; 2,222; 47.91%	Albert Turcotte; 1,059; 22.83%	Victor E. Justik; 1,091; 23.52%	Peter G. Forman; 255; 5.50%		Karl Earnest Nordstrom
Bow Valley-Empress	William Delday; 2,871; 60.19%	George Timko; 923; 19.35%	George A. Simpson; 972; 20.38%			William Delday
Calgary Bowness	Charles E. Johnston; 5,355; 52.11%	Peter Petrasuk; 2,456; 23.90%	Albert A. Frawley; 1,719; 16.73%	Everett C. Baldwin; 735; 7.15%		Charles E. Johnston
Calgary-Centre	Frederick C. Colborne; 4,395; 61.22%	E. Virgil Anderson; 1,878; 26.16%		Mrs. Melba Cochlan; 757; 10.54%	Dave Raichman (Comm.); 101; 1.41%	Frederick C. Colborne
Calgary-East	Albert W. Ludwig; 4,763; 60.23%	Evelyn Leew; 677; 8.56%	Bill Duncan; 1,497; 18.93%	Dick Dunlop; 953; 12.05%		
Calgary-Glenmore	A. Ross Lawson; 4,268; 31.40%	William Daniel Dickie; 6,037; 44.42%	Ned Corrigal; 2,891; 21.27%	G.A.J. Otjes; 374; 2.75%		Ernest S. Watkins
Calgary-North	Robert A. Simpson; 4,713; 56.82%	Robert F. Goss; 794; 9.57%	Larry B. Nugent; 2,123; 25.59%	Steven P. Galan; 647; 7.80%		Rose Wilkinson
Calgary Queens Park	Lea Leavitt; 4,363; 48.19%	John Donnachie; 961; 10.61%	Duncan Lovell McKillop; 1,597; 17.64%	Ben S. Greenfield; 509; 5.62%	Roy Alexander Farran (Ind.); 1,469; 16.22% Conrad Pfeifer (Ind. SoCred); 126; 1.39%	
Calgary-South	Arthur J. Dixon; 5,661; 60.51%	Howard G. Cook; 2,529; 27.03%		John N. Smith; 1,123; 12.00%		
Calgary-West	Donald S. Fleming; 5,183; 42.76%	Ted Duncan; 2,250; 18.56%	Asa Milton Harradence; 4,109; 33.90%	Jack D. Peters; 568; 4.69%		Donald S. Fleming
Camrose	Chester I. Sayers; 3,427; 56.57%	James P. Richardson; 746; 12.31%	Ernest Moore; 1,519; 25.07%	Kenneth Nelson; 356; 5.88%		Chester I. Sayers
Cardston	Edgar W. Hinman; 2,527; 68.00%	John Fenton Webster; 1,035; 27.85%		Collin H. Holt; 150; 4.04%		Edgar W. Hinman
Clover Bar	Floyd M. Baker; 3,730; 57.65%	James P. O'Dwyer; 791; 12.23%	Daniel F. Hollands; 1,407; 21.75%	Paul Arthur Dorin; 535; 8.27%		Floyd M. Baker
Cypress	Harry E. Strom; 3,030; 77.71%	Alvin H. Reiman; 861; 22.08%				Harry E. Strom
Drumheller-Gleichen	Gordon Edward Taylor; 4,565; 86.07%			Irene Dyck; 720; 13.57%		
Dunvegan	Ernest L. Lee; 1,306; 52.45%	M.H. (Milt) Connery; 849; 34.10%		Roy A. Mitchell; 325; 13.05%		Joseph M. Scruggs
Edmonton North	Ethel Sylvia Wilson; 4,655; 52.17%	Thomas O'Dwyer; 2,489; 27.90%		William H. Nash; 1,743; 19.54%		Ethel Sylvia Wilson
Edmonton-Centre	Ambrose Holowach; 3,378; 47.56%	Joseph A. Tannous; 1,219; 17.16%	Gerard Joseph Amerongen; 1,492; 21.01%	Alex Szchechina; 993; 13.98%		Ambrose Holowach
Edmonton-Jasper Place	John William Horan; 3,639; 45.14%	Keith C. Campbell; 2,234; 27.71%	Clarence Edgar Sage; 1,034; 12.83%	Patrick J. Ryan; 1,128; 13.99%		
Edmonton-North East	Lou W. Heard; 4,023; 42.66%	Ken McAuley; 1,295; 13.73%	Allan Welsh; 1,510; 16.01%	Neil Reimer; 2,589; 27.45%		Lou W. Heard
Edmonton-North West	Edgar H. Gerhart; 4,369; 45.97%	Edmund H. Leger; 1,854; 19.51%	Ned Feehan; 1,878; 19.76%	Grant W. Notley; 1,391; 14.64%		Edgar H. Gerhart
Edmonton-Norwood	William Tomyn; 3,905; 47.86%	J. Laurier Picard; 1,628; 19.95%	J. Gordon Ozarko; 1,190; 14.58%	Robert W. Douglas; 1,330; 16.30%	Walter Makowecki (Comm.); 93; 1.14%	William Tomyn
Edmonton-West	Stanley Gordon Geldart; 3,733; 41.83%	Robert A. Doyle; 2,572; 28.82%	Tony Nugent; 2,019; 22.62%	Neil R. Larsen; 585; 6.55%		
Edson	Norman Alfred Willmore; 2,668; 56.16%	Bertram E. Schoeppe; 1,371; 28.86%		James D. Torgersen; 701; 14.75%		Norman Alfred Willmore
Grande Prairie	Ira McLaughlin; 4,763; 72.94%	Ed. Kimpe; 997; 15.27%		Charles A. Evaskevich; 762; 11.67%		Ira McLaughlin
Grouard	Roy Ells; 3,832; 62.38%	Gunner Wahlstrom; 1,595; 25.96%		Clif. I. Tollefson; 674; 10.97%		Roy Ells
Hand Hills-Acadia	Clinton Keith French; 3,215; 61.77%				Lyall Alexander Curry (Ind.); 1,972; 37.89%	
Lac La Biche	Elvin J. Woynarowich; 1,479; 36.11%	Michael Maccagno; 1,809; 44.17%	Henry T. Thompson; 260; 6.35%	Henry Tomaschuk; 297; 7.25%	Rudolph Michetti (Ind. SoCred); 246; 6.01%	Michael Maccagno
Lac Ste. Anne	William Patterson; 2,777; 51.94%	Douglas P. McKeen; 1,794; 33.55%		John Liss; 1,474; 27.57%		William Patterson
Lacombe	Allan Russell Patrick; 3,405; 69.22%	John Paul Fehrenbach; 776; 15.78%		John Liss; 1,474; 29.97%		Allan Russell Patrick
Leduc	James D. Henderson; 1,898; 39.74%	Ronald John Hayter; 461; 9.65%	Peter Wyllie; 971; 20.33%	Andrew Simon Borys; 613; 12.84%	Ronald Earl Ansley (Ind. SoCred); 731; 15.31% Michael F. Hold (AUM); 88; 1.84%	Ronald Earl Ansley
Lethbridge	John C. Landeryou; 6,975; 60.05%	Alan Cullen; 3,786; 32.60%		James Taylor; 820; 7.06%		John C. Landeryou
Little Bow	Raymond Albert Speaker; 3,368; 63.72%	Arthur W. Ulrich; 649; 12.28%	Douglas H. Galbraith; 1,245; 23.55%			Peter Dawson
Macleod	James Hartley; 3,127; 64.57%		Allie Streeter; 1,466; 30.27%	John K. Head; 238; 4.91%		James Hartley
Medicine Hat	Harry C. Leinweber; 4,954; 51.77%	Helen Beny Gibson; 2,259; 23.61%	Kenneth Roy Biddell; 1,485; 15.52%	Milton J. Reinhardt; 841; 8.79%		Elizabeth G. Robinson
Okotoks-High River	Edward P. Benoit; 2,361; 52.55%	Robert E.G. Armstrong; 448; 9.97%	Samuel Brown; 1,585; 35.28%	Bill Steemson; 86; 1.91%		Ernest G. Hansell
Olds-Didsbury	Robert Curtis Clark; 3,950; 66.79%			Eva Banta; 400; 6.76%	Roger Lebeuf (AUM); 1,550; 26.21%	
Peace River	Euell F. Montgomery; 2,782; 60.32%	Vic. O'Reilly; 980; 21.25%	Hall C. Sisson; 842; 18.26%			William F. Gilliland
Pembina	Robin D. Jorgenson; 3,067; 55.78%	Ray Brodeur; 842; 15.31%	Percy Baxandall; 823; 14.97%	Herman Hauch; 562; 10.22%	Verdun Baxandall (Ind. SoCred); 165; 3.00%	Robin D. Jorgenson
Pincher Creek-Crowsnest	William A. Kovach; 2,524; 54.30%	Thomas J. Costigan; 539; 11.60%	Frank Lynch-Staunton; 953; 20.50%	Arthur Lees; 621; 13.36%		William A. Kovach
Ponoka	Glen F. Johnston; 1,830; 44.56%				Neville S. Roper (Ind. SoCred); 1,721; 41.90% George F. Sharp (Ind.); 525; 12.78%	Glen F. Johnston
Red Deer	William Kenneth Ure; 6,016; 57.57%	Denis Yunker; 609; 5.83%	Walter M. Ogilvie; 3,323; 31.80%	Herman H. Dorin; 446; 4.27%		William Kenneth Ure
Redwater	Michael Senych; 1,670; 41.61%	Steve Romanchuk; 755; 18.81%	Joe Bielish; 1,362; 33.94%	William Glass; 216; 5.38%		John Dubetz
Rocky Mountain House	Alfred J. Hooke; 3,175; 72.32%	Ellis M. Bowen; 591; 13.46%		Robert H. Carlyle; 599; 13.64%		Alfred J. Hooke
Sedgewick-Coronation	Jack C. Hillman; 3,999; 67.72%	James Leland Sims; 1,368; 23.17%		Karl O. Peterson; 529; 8.96%		
Spirit River	Lionel Lizee; 383; 8.68%	Adolph O. Fimrite; 3,077; 69.73%		Uri Powell; 948; 21.48%		Adolph O. Fimrite
St. Albert	Keith Everitt; 2,540; 39.85%	Louis Chalifoux; 2,030; 31.85%	Alan Lazerte; 1,332; 20.90%	Alan Bevington; 451; 7.08%		Keith Everitt
St. Paul	Raymond Reierson; 2,889; 60.90%	Rene P. Foisy; 1,363; 28.73%		H.B. Hodgins; 265; 5.59%	Daniel Gamache (Comm.); 215; 4.53%	Raymond Reierson
Stettler	Galen C. Norris; 3,076; 68.02%	Clark K. Burlingham; 1,065; 23.55%		Joseph J. Tipman; 369; 8.16%		Galen C. Norris
Stony Plain	Cornelia R. Wood; 2,716; 41.75%	Harold McLaughlin; 1,921; 29.53%	Peter Germaniuk; 903; 13.88%	Conrad D. (Red) Fuhr; 358; 5.50%	Rudolph Zander (AUM); 595; 9.15%	Cornelia R. Wood
Strathcona Centre	Joseph Donovan Ross; 5,232; 58.39%	Ian Nicoll; 2,418; 26.99%		Harry J. Strynadka; 1,262; 14.08%		Joseph Donovan Ross
Strathcona East	Ernest C. Manning; 6,842; 53.22%	James A. Cox; 1,890; 14.70%	Oscar H. Kruger; 2,630; 20.46%	Dennis A. Wood; 1,457; 11.33%		Ernest C. Manning
Strathcona West	Randolph H. McKinnon; 5,029; 47.47%	Arthur W. Crossley; 2,557; 24.14%	Arnold H. Lane; 1,863; 17.59%	George R. Field; 936; 8.84%		Randolph H. McKinnon
Taber-Warner	Leonard C. Halmrast; 0					
Three Hills	Louis Petrie Meston; 3,385; 62.70%	James A. Lore; 1,728; 32.01%		John F. Kennan; 257; 4.76%		
Vegreville-Bruce	Alex W. Gordey; 2,925; 50.03%	Wilfrid L. Horton; 675; 11.55%	Graham Allan; 1,194; 20.42%	Albin Lukawiecki; 851; 14.56%	Clarence A. Knies (Ind. SoCred); 189; 3.23%	
Vermilion	Ashley H. Cooper; 2,964; 68.08%	Arthur W. Roland; 837; 19.22%		Edward I. Thompson; 545; 12.52%		Ashley H. Cooper
Wainwright	Henry A. Ruste; 3,465; 76.25%	John M. Saville; 668; 14.70%		John Wesley Connelly; 387; 8.52%		Henry A. Ruste
Wetaskiwin	Albert W. Strohschein; 3,333; 61.01%	Albert (Butch) Dyberg; 1,298; 23.76%		Leslie Pritchard; 823; 15.06%		John A. Wingblade
Willingdon-Two Hills	Nicholas A. Melnyk; 2,315; 56.53%	Allan Eschak; 283; 6.91%	Walter Witwicky; 993; 24.25%	William Glen Haley; 496; 12.11%		

== See also ==
- List of Canadian political parties
