= Arthur Wray =

Canadian politician

Arthur Henry Wray

Member of the Legislative Assembly of Alberta
- In office July 8, 1944 – August 5, 1952
- Preceded by: Frank Laut
- Succeeded by: Lee Leavitt
- Constituency: Banff-Cochrane

Personal details
- Born: September 13, 1906 Port Colborne, Ontario
- Died: December 1, 1993 (aged 87)
- Party: Social Credit; Independent Social Credit
- Occupation: politician

Arthur Henry Wray (September 13, 1906 – December 1, 1993) was a provincial level politician from Alberta, Canada. He served as a member of the Legislative Assembly of Alberta from 1944 to 1952. He first sat with the governing Social Credit caucus and then as an Independent in 1946 after he was expelled.

== Political career ==
Wray ran for a seat to the Alberta Legislature for the first time in the 1944 Alberta general election as a Social Credit candidate. He won the electoral district of Banff-Cochrane in a tight race defeating Independent incumbent Frank Laut. Wray was trailing in second place on the first count. The second choice preferences of Co-operative Commonwealth candidate D. MacGregor put Wray ahead of Laut and gave him a slim majority to pick up the district for his party.

The winter of 1946 brought a series of terrific snow storms to the town of Cochrane, Alberta. The storms paralyzed the town and the areas to north, causing school children to miss 63 out of 114 school days. Wray lobbied Public Works minister William Fallow to begin clearing the provincial main and secondary highways that became impassable outside of the town. Fallow refused to give any priority to Cochrane and said the government does not clear secondary highways. He dismissed a delegation from the town including Wray who went to Edmonton to meet with the minister.

Wray lost the battle with the Cabinet to clear the roads. He continued to be a Social Credit government supporter, but tensions between him and his caucus and the ministry began to rise. This came to a head in February 1947 when the Assembly moved and voted on a motion forcing Wray to cross the floor to the opposition benches. Speaker Peter Dawson forced Wray to move by not recognizing him in the debate because he was not at his desk, which was now on the opposition side. Wray took his desk in protest but failed in his bid to return to the government side of the house. He was forced to move a second time when the Army, Navy, Air Force caucus objected to Wray sitting with them. He was moved to the other end of the opposition benches to sit with Veterans' and Active Force MLA William J. Williams.

Wray ran for re-election in the 1948 Alberta general election as an Independent Social Credit candidate. He faced Laut and former Cochrane MLA William King. The election was hotly contested with Wray finishing second on the first ballot. The elimination of King gave Wray enough second choice votes to finish ahead of Laut and hold his district.

Wray ran for a third term in the 1952 Alberta general election. He was easily defeated by Social Credit candidate Lee Leavitt, finishing a very distant third place.

Wray ran once more for a seat as an Independent candidate in the Calgary electoral district in the 1955 Alberta general election. He was not be much of a contender, finishing very distant in the field of candidates.
