= Banff-Cochrane =

Defunct provincial electoral district in Alberta, Canada

Alberta electoral district
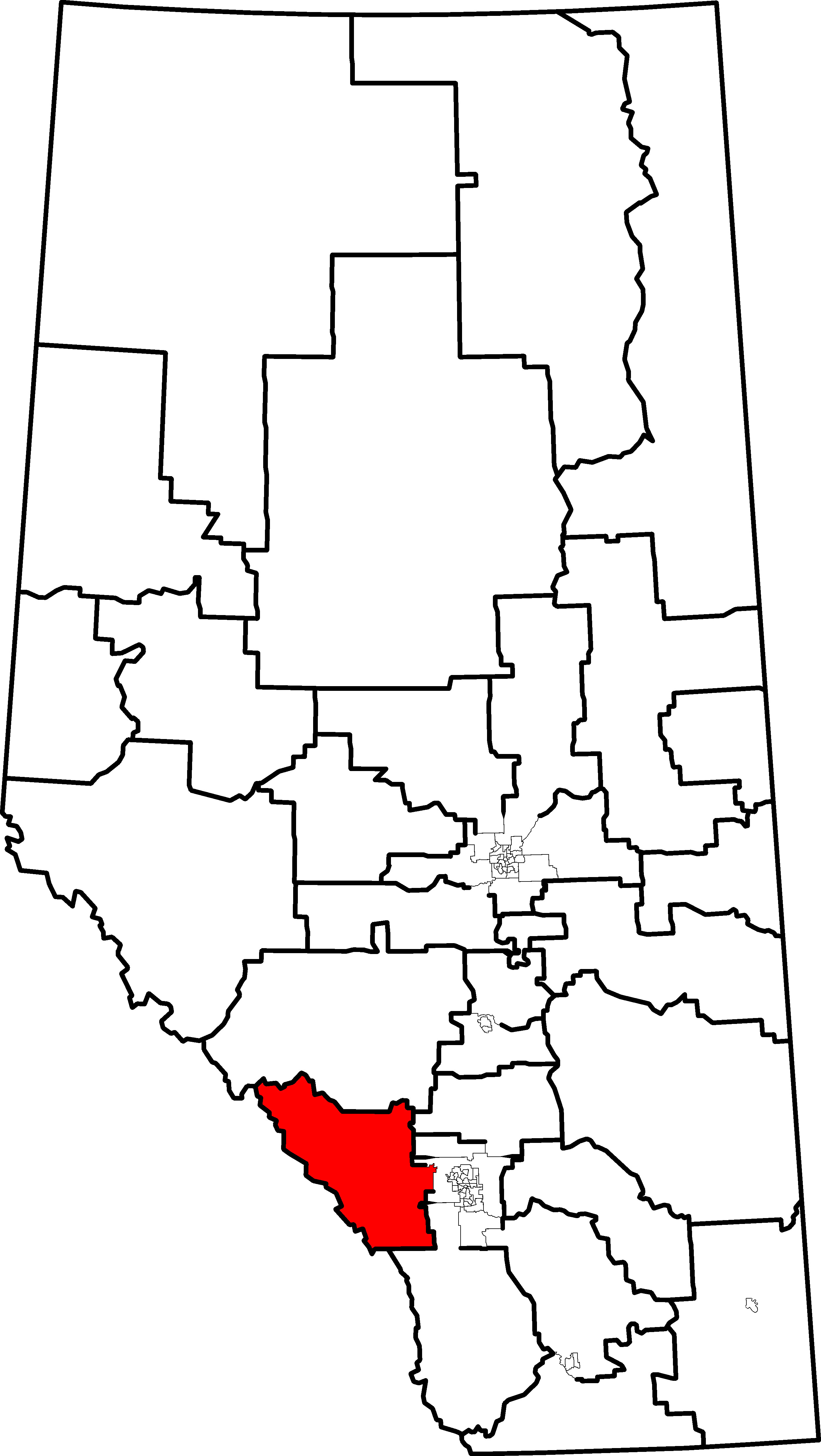
- 2010 boundaries

Defunct provincial electoral district
- Legislature: Legislative Assembly of Alberta
- District created: 1940
- District abolished: 2019
- First contested: 1940
- Last contested: 2015

Banff-Cochrane was a provincial electoral district in Alberta, Canada, mandated to return a single member to the Legislative Assembly of Alberta from 1940 to 2019. The Banff-Cochrane electoral district is home to the town of Banff and the popular tourist destination Banff National Park, environmental issues tend to dominate here.

The cost of living is significantly high especially in Canmore where there is a struggle to fill low wage service sector jobs, due to the high cost of living. Bears and wildlife encounters are also common in this riding, requiring extra attention to waste disposal. The area has many ski resorts and a number of ranchers and farmers make their home in the Alberta Foothills.

The riding was first created in 1940 out of the north half of the old Rocky Mountain riding, and the Cochrane riding. From 1975 to 1979 the riding was renamed Banff but was later reversed.

A previous Banff riding existed from 1905 to 1909.

== History ==
Banff was one of the original 25 electoral districts contested in the 1905 Alberta general election upon Alberta joining Confederation in September 1905. The district was carried over from the old Banff electoral district which returned a single member to the Legislative Assembly of the Northwest Territories from 1891 to 1905.

The riding disappeared only one election later when it was merged into the newly formed Rocky Mountain Riding.

Banff-Cochrane was created in the 1940 boundary re-distribution from the electoral districts of Cochrane and Rocky Mountain. From 1940 to 1956, the district used instant-runoff voting to elect its MLA.

In 1975 the riding name was changed to Banff and it was set back to Banff-Cochrane in the 1977 re-distribution.

The 2010 electoral boundary re-distribution saw Banff-Cochrane gain the land south of Cochrane that was in the old Foothills-Rocky View electoral district.

The Banff-Cochrane electoral district was dissolved in the 2017 electoral boundary re-distribution, and portions of the district would form the newly created Banff-Kananaskis and Airdrie-Cochrane electoral districts.

=== Boundary history ===
45 Banff-Cochrane 2003 boundaries
Bordering districts
North	East	West	South
Rocky Mountain House	Foothills-Rocky View, Olds-Didsbury-Three Hills, Highwood	none	Livingstone-Macleod
riding map goes here		map in relation to other districts in Alberta goes here	
Legal description from the Statutes of Alberta 2003, Electoral Divisions Act.
Starting at the intersection of the east boundary of Rge. 19 W5 and the east boundary of Banff National Park; then 1. in a generally southeasterly direction along the park boundary to the north boundary of Twp. 30; 2. east along the north boundary of the Twp. to the east boundary of Rge. 8 W5; 3. north along the east boundary of Rge. 8 W5 to the intersection with the right bank of the Red Deer River; 4. downstream along the right bank to the north boundary of Twp. 31; 5. east along the north boundary of the Twp. to the east boundary of Sec. 33 in Twp. 31, Rge. 6 W5; 6. south along the east boundary of Secs. 33, 28, 21 and 16 to the north boundary of Sec. 10 in the Twp.; 7. east along the north boundary of Secs. 10, 11 and 12 in the Twp. to the east boundary of Rge. 6; 8. south along the east boundary of Rge. 6 to the north boundary of Twp. 29, Rge. 6 W5; 9. west along the north boundary to the east boundary of Sec. 34; 10. south along the east boundary of Secs. 34 and 27 to the north boundary of Sec. 23 in the Twp.; 11. east along the north boundary of Sec. 23 to the east boundary of Sec. 23; 12. south along the east boundary to the north boundary of the south half of Sec. 24 in the Twp.; 13. east along the north boundary of the south half of Sec. 24 to the east boundary of the west half of Sec. 24; 14. south along the east boundary of the west half of Sec. 24 to the north boundary of Sec. 13; 15. east along the north boundary of Sec. 13 to the east boundary of Rge. 6 W5; 16. south along the east boundary of Rge. 6 to the north boundary of Sec. 12, Twp. 27, Rge. 6 W5; 17. west along the north boundary to the east boundary of Sec. 11; 18. south along the east boundary of Secs. 11 and 2 in Twp. 27 and the east boundary of Secs. 35, 26, and 23 in Twp. 26 to the west shore of the Ghost Lake Reservoir; 19. south along the west shore to the north boundary of Sec. 12 in the Twp.; 20. east along the north boundary of Sec. 12 to the southeast shore of the Ghost Lake Reservoir and the northeast boundary of the Stoney Indian Reserve No. 142, 143 and 144; 21. generally east and south along the Stoney Indian Reserve No. 142, 143 and 144 to the west town boundary of Cochrane (at the east boundary of Sec. 8 in Twp. 26, Rge. 4 W5); 22. north along the east boundary of Sec. 8 to the north boundary of Sec. 9; 23. east along the north boundary of Secs. 9, 10, 11 and 12 to the east boundary of Rge. 4 W5; 24. south along the east boundary of Rge. 4 W5 to the east town boundary of Cochrane; 25. south, west and north along the Cochrane town boundary to the east boundary of the Stoney Indian Reserve No. 142, 143 and 144; 26. westerly along the boundary of the Stoney Indian Reserve No. 142, 143 and 144 to the intersection with the east boundary of Rge. 6 W5; 27. south along the east boundary of Rge. 6 to the north boundary of Twp. 23 and the intersection with the east boundary of the Rocky Mountains Forest Reserve; 28. south and east along the east boundary of the Rocky Mountains Forest Reserve to the north boundary of Sec. 14 in Twp. 15, Rge. 3 W5 (Highway 532); 29. southwesterly along the boundary of the Cataract Creek Snow Vehicle Forest Land Use Zone described in Order In Council 998/79 to the east boundary of Rge. 6 W5; 30. south along the east boundary of Rge. 6 W5 to the north boundary of Twp. 13; 31. west along the north boundary of Twp. 13 to the Alberta-British Columbia boundary; 32. northwesterly along the boundary to its intersection with the north boundary of Twp. 32; 33. northeast along a projected line to the starting point.
Note:

49 Banff-Cochrane 2010 boundaries
Bordering districts
North	East	West	South
Rimbey-Rocky Mountain House-Sundre	Airdrie, Chestermere-Rocky View, Livingstone-Macleod and Olds-Didsbury-Three Hills	British Columbia boundary	Livingstone-Macleod
Legal description from the Statutes of Alberta 2010, Electoral Divisions Act.
Note:

Members of the Legislative Assembly for Banff-Cochrane
Assembly	Years	Member	Party
See Banff (N.W.T.) 1891-1905
1st	1905–1909	Charles W. Fisher	Liberal
See Rocky Mountain, Okotoks and Cochrane 1909-1940
See Cochrane 1909–1940 and Rocky Mountain 1909–1940
9th	1940–1944	Frank Laut	Independent
10th	1944–1946	Arthur Wray	Social Credit
10th	1946–1948	Arthur Wray	Independent; Social Credit
11th	1948–1952	Arthur Wray	Independent; Social Credit
12th	1952–1955	Lee Leavitt	Social Credit
13th	1955–1959	Frank Gainer	Coalition
14th	1959–1963	Frank Gainer	Coalition
15th	1963–1967	Frank Gainer	Coalition
16th	1967–1971	Clarence Copithorne	Independent
16th	1971	Clarence Copithorne	Progressive; Conservative
17th	1971–1975	Clarence Copithorne	Progressive; Conservative
19th	1975–1979	Frederick Kidd	Progressive; Conservative
19th	1979–1982	Greg Stevens	Progressive; Conservative
20th	1982–1986	Greg Stevens	Progressive; Conservative
21st	1986–1989	Greg Stevens	Progressive; Conservative
22nd	1989–1993	Brian Evans	Progressive; Conservative
23rd	1993–1997	Brian Evans	Progressive; Conservative
24th	1997–2001	Janis Tarchuk	Progressive; Conservative
25th	2001–2004	Janis Tarchuk	Progressive; Conservative
26th	2004–2008	Janis Tarchuk	Progressive; Conservative
27th	2008–2012	Janis Tarchuk	Progressive; Conservative
28th	2012–2015	Ron Casey	Progressive; Conservative
29th	2015–2019	Cam Westhead	New Democratic
See Banff-Kananaskis and Airdrie-Cochrane 2019–

=== Electoral history ===
The electoral district was created in the 1940 boundary redistribution primarily from the ridings of Cochrane and Rocky Mountain. The first representative to win the district was Independent candidate Frant Laut who defeated former Cochrane Social Credit incumbent William King in a hotly contested race.

Laut was defeated running for a second term in the 1944 general election by Social Credit candidate Arthur Wray. Two years into his term Wray was suspended by the Social Credit caucus on February 20, 1946, for criticizing the Alberta government after requests to the Public Works department to remove snow from Cochrane roads was ignored. The situation came to a head a year later when the Social Credit members passed a motion in the legislature to force Wray to move his desk to the opposition side of the house. His stand against cabinet won praise from his constituents in Cochrane.

The 1948 election would see a hotly contested battle as King and Laut attempt to regain their seat. Wray hung on to a second term in vote transfers. Wray would run for a third term in the 1952 election but would be defeated finishing a distant third by Social Credit candidate Lee Leavitt.

Leavitt was defeated by Frank Gainer who was one of two joint nominee's by the Progressive Conservative and Liberal parties in the 1955 election. He ran with the Coalition banner and sat in the legislature with it. Gainer won re-election in a hotly contested race in 1959. Pundits at the time figured he would be chosen to lead the four opposition members of different stripes with his Coalition banner, however no one was picked. He won a third term in 1963 before retiring in 1967.

The wide open race in 1967 saw Independent candidate Clarence Copithorne defeat Social Credit candidate Roy Wilson to win the district. Copithorne joined the Progressive Conservative caucus on April 15, 1971. He stood for reelection as a Progressive Conservative a few months later winning a strong plurality. He retired from provincial politics at dissolution in 1975.

In 1975 the riding name was changed to Banff before being changed back in 1979. Progressive Conservative candidate Greg Stevens held the district for three terms before retiring in 1993. He was replaced by Brian Evans for two terms. Janis Tarchuck was elected in 2001 and served until 2012 when she was replaced by Ron Casey. Ron Casey would be defeated by NDP member Cameron Westhead in the 2015 general election.

== Legislative election results ==
=== 1905 ===
The first incarnation of the Banff electoral district in Alberta was created in 1905 when Alberta was created into a province separate from the Northwest Territories. The electoral district replaced the old Banff territorial electoral district that had previously been represented in the Legislative Assembly of the North-West Territories from 1891 to 1905. Banff during that era was defining itself as a destination for tourists due to its natural environment. The electoral district also saw growth as mining camps were springing up forming a fertile pocket for the socialist movement. Howard Douglas would serve as Returning Officer.

The electoral district was hotly contested and the race was closely watched around the province. The electoral district had two well known candidates and political veterans. Charles Wellington Fisher the provincial Liberal candidate had been serving as a North-West Territories MLA supporting the Haultain government for the old Banff electoral district since winning a by-election on February 4, 1903. He was opposed by Conservative candidate Robert George Brett who had also been a North-West Territories MLA starting in 1888 and represented the Banff electoral district from its creation in 1891 to 1899.

Brett was a pioneer medical doctor who was heavily involved in the early history of the town of Banff having moved to the site in 1883 and founding a sanitarium.

On election night the results came back; Fisher had defeated Brett by winning a slim 58 majority of the 784 votes cast. The Conservative party was disappointed with the result as the district had been one of their best hopes to pick up.

1905 Alberta general election: Banff
Party	Candidate	Votes	%
Liberal	Charles W. Fisher	421	53.70%
Conservative	Robert George Brett	363	46.30%
Total		784	–
Rejected, spoiled and declined		N/A	–
Eligible electors / turnout		N/A	–
Liberal pickup new district.			
Source(s) Source: "Banff Official Results 1905 Alberta general election". Alberta Heritage Community Foundation.

=== 1940 ===
1940 Alberta general election
Party	Candidate	Votes	%	±%
Independent	Frank Laut	2,931	61.06%	–
Social Credit	William Robert King	1,869	38.94%	–
Total		4,800	–	–
Rejected, spoiled and declined		227	–	–
Eligible electors / turnout		6,253	80.39%	–
Independent pickup new district.				
Source(s) Source: "Banff-Cochrane Official Results 1940 Alberta general election". Alberta Heritage Community Foundation.

=== 1944 ===
1944 Alberta general election
Party	Candidate	Votes 1st count	%	Votes final count	±%
Social Credit	Arthur H. Wray	1,568	38.51%	1,805	-0.43%
Independent	Frank Laut	1,602	39.34%	1,757	-21.72%
Co-operative Commonwealth	D. MacGregor	902	22.15%	–	–
Total		4,072	–	–	–
Rejected, spoiled and declined		118	–	–	–
Eligible electors / turnout		5,698	73.53%	-6.86%	–
Social Credit gain from Independent		Swing		-11.48%	
Source(s) Source: "Banff-Cochrane Official Results 1944 Alberta general election". Alberta Heritage Community Foundation. Instant-runoff voting requires a candidate to receive a plurality (greater than 50%) of the votes. As no candidate received a plurality of votes, the bottom candidate was eliminated and their 2nd place votes were applied to both other candidates until one received a plurality.

=== 1948 ===
1948 Alberta general election
Party	Candidate	Votes 1st count	%	Votes final count	±%
Independent Social Credit	Arthur H. Wray	1,658	41.57%	1,964	–
Independent Movement	Frank Laut	1,246	31.24%	1,465	–
Social Credit	William Robert King	1,084	27.18%	–	-11.33%
Total		3,988	–	–	–
Rejected, spoiled and declined		291	–	–	–
Eligible electors / turnout		7,356	58.17%	-15.36%	–
Independent Social Credit gain from Social Credit		Swing		5.58%	
Source(s) Source: "Banff-Cochrane Official Results 1948 Alberta general election". Alberta Heritage Community Foundation. Instant-runoff voting requires a candidate to receive a plurality (greater than 50%) of the votes. As no candidate received a plurality of votes, the bottom candidate was eliminated and their 2nd place votes were applied to both other candidates until one received a plurality.

=== 1952 ===
1952 Alberta general election
Party	Candidate	Votes	%	±%
Social Credit	Lee Leavitt	1,845	54.73%	27.55%
Liberal	C.C. Mathews	1,035	30.70%	–
Independent Social Credit	Arthur H. Wray	491	14.57%	-27.01%
Total		3,371	–	–
Rejected, spoiled and declined		283	–	–
Eligible electors / turnout		6,430	56.83%	-1.34%
Social Credit gain from Independent Social Credit		Swing		6.85%
Source(s) Source: "Banff-Cochrane Official Results 1952 Alberta general election". Alberta Heritage Community Foundation.

=== 1955 ===
1955 Alberta general election
Party	Candidate	Votes	%	±%
Coalition	Frank L. Gainer	2,342	54.87%	–
Social Credit	Lee Leavitt	1,926	45.13%	-9.61%
Total		4,268	–	–
Rejected, spoiled and declined		293	–	–
Eligible electors / turnout		6,452	70.69%	13.86%
Coalition gain from Social Credit		Swing		-7.14%
Source(s) Source: "Banff-Cochrane Official Results 1955 Alberta general election". Alberta Heritage Community Foundation.

=== 1959 ===
1959 Alberta general election
Party	Candidate	Votes	%	±%
Coalition	Frank L. Gainer	2,279	50.79%	-4.08%
Social Credit	Robin W. Echlin	2,208	49.21%	4.08%
Total		4,487	–	–
Rejected, spoiled and declined		25	–	–
Eligible electors / turnout		7,136	63.23%	-7.46%
Coalition hold		Swing		-4.08%
Source(s) Source: "Banff-Cochrane Official Results 1959 Alberta general election". Alberta Heritage Community Foundation.

=== 1963 ===
1963 Alberta general election
Party	Candidate	Votes	%	±%
Coalition	Frack L. Gainer	2,179	49.66%	-1.13%
Social Credit	Victor Watson	1,878	42.80%	-6.41%
New Democratic	Jack Fraser	331	7.54%	–
Total		4,388	–	–
Rejected, spoiled and declined		12	–	–
Eligible electors / turnout		6,921	63.57%	0.35%
Coalition hold		Swing		2.64%
Source(s) Source: "Banff-Cochrane Official Results 1963 Alberta general election". Alberta Heritage Community Foundation.

=== 1967 ===
1967 Alberta general election
Party	Candidate	Votes	%	±%
Independent	Clarence Copithorne	2,428	49.88%	–
Social Credit	Roy Wilson	2,066	42.44%	-0.36%
New Democratic	Jack Fraser	374	7.68%	0.14%
Total		4,868	–	–
Rejected, spoiled and declined		31	–	–
Eligible electors / turnout		7,653	64.01%	0.44%
Independent gain from Coalition		Swing		0.29%
Source(s) Source: "Banff-Cochrane Official Results 1967 Alberta general election". Alberta Heritage Community Foundation.

=== 1971 ===
1971 Alberta general election
Party	Candidate	Votes	%	±%
Progressive Conservative	Clarence Copithorne	3,801	55.34%	–
Social Credit	Slim Martin	2,647	38.54%	-3.90%
New Democratic	Beverly Coulter	420	6.12%	-1.57%
Total		6,868	–	–
Rejected, spoiled and declined		187	–	–
Eligible electors / turnout		10,619	66.44%	2.42%
Progressive Conservative notional gain from Independent		Swing		4.68%
Source(s) Source: "Banff-Cochrane Official Results 1971 Alberta general election". Alberta Heritage Community Foundation.

=== 1975 ===
1975 Alberta general election: Banff
Party	Candidate	Votes	%
Progressive Conservative	Fred Kidd	5,221	69.24%
Social Credit	Merlyn Kirk	1,129	14.97%
New Democratic	Wayne Getty	737	9.77%
Liberal	Morna Schechtel	453	6.01%
Total		7,540	–
Rejected, spoiled and declined		35	–
Eligible electors / turnout		12,186	62.16%
Source(s) Source: "Banff Official Results 1975 Alberta general election". Alberta Heritage Community Foundation.

=== 1979 ===
1979 Alberta general election
Party	Candidate	Votes	%	±%
Progressive Conservative	Greg Stevens	5,578	66.87	-2.38
Social Credit	Thomas McArthur	1,462	17.53	+2.55
New Democratic	Bob Ritchie	759	9.10	-0.68
Liberal	Morna F. Schechtel	543	6.51	+0.50
Total		8,342	99.89	–
Rejected, spoiled and declined		9	0.11	-0.35
Turnout		8,351	55.36	-6.81
Eligible voters		15,086		
Progressive Conservative hold		Swing		-2.46
Source(s) Source: "March 14 1979 (AB)". Canadian Elections Database. Change in comparison to Banff electoral district results in the 1975 Alberta general election.

=== 1982 ===
1982 Alberta general election
Party	Candidate	Votes	%	±%
Progressive Conservative	Greg Stevens	8,369	72.30	+5.43
Western Canada Concept	Larry Peterson	1,919	16.58	–
New Democratic	David Evans	1,288	11.13	+2.03
Total		11,576	99.60	–
Rejected, spoiled and declined		47	0.40	+0.30
Turnout		11,623	62.38	+7.02
Eligible voters		18,634		
Progressive Conservative hold		Swing		-5.57
Source(s) Source: "November 02 1982 (AB)". Canadian Election Database.

=== 1986 ===
1986 Alberta general election
Party	Candidate	Votes	%	±%
Progressive Conservative	Greg Stevens	4,536	66.05%	-6.25%
New Democratic	Ed Fisher	1,452	21.14%	10.02%
Independent	Bill Deacon	444	6.46%	–
Representative	Betty Ann Stimson	436	6.35%	–
Total		6,868	–	–
Rejected, spoiled and declined		22	–	–
Eligible electors / turnout		16,290	42.30%	-20.03%
Progressive Conservative hold		Swing		-5.41%
Source(s) Source: "Banff-Cochrane Official Results 1986 Alberta general election". Alberta Heritage Community Foundation.

=== 1989 ===
1989 Alberta general election
Party	Candidate	Votes	%	±%
Progressive Conservative	Brian Evans	4,389	51.02%	-15.02%
Liberal	Jim N. Tanner	2,411	28.03%	–
New Democratic	Steven Scott	1,802	20.95%	-0.19%
Total		8,602	–	–
Rejected, spoiled and declined		35	–	–
Eligible electors / turnout		17,665	48.89%	6.60%
Progressive Conservative hold		Swing		-10.95%
Source(s) Source: "Banff-Cochrane Official Results 1989 Alberta general election". Alberta Heritage Community Foundation.

=== 1993 ===
1993 Alberta general election
Party	Candidate	Votes	%	±%
Progressive Conservative	Brian Evans	6,552	52.55%	1.53%
Liberal	Paula Andrews	4,183	33.55%	5.52%
New Democratic	Cindy McCallum	1,048	8.41%	-12.54%
Independent	Brian L. Horejsi	607	4.87%	–
Natural Law	Ginger (V.M.) Sheets-Revitt	77	0.62%	–
Total		12,467	–	–
Rejected, spoiled and declined		29	–	–
Eligible electors / turnout		20,235	61.75%	12.86%
Progressive Conservative hold		Swing		-2.00%
Source(s) Source: "Banff-Cochrane Official Results 1993 Alberta general election". Alberta Heritage Community Foundation.

=== 1997 ===
1997 Alberta general election
Party	Candidate	Votes	%	±%
Progressive Conservative	Janis Tarchuk	7,180	61.13%	8.57%
Liberal	Judy Stewart	3,151	26.83%	-6.73%
New Democratic	Jeff Eamon	754	6.42%	-1.99%
Social Credit	Scott Mudford	661	5.63%	–
Total		11,746	–	–
Rejected, spoiled and declined		32	–	–
Eligible electors / turnout		23,646	49.81%	-11.94%
Progressive Conservative hold		Swing		7.65%
Source(s) Source: "Banff-Cochrane Official Results 1997 Alberta general election". Alberta Heritage Community Foundation.

=== 2001 ===
2001 Alberta general election
Party	Candidate	Votes	%	±%
Progressive Conservative	Janis Tarchuk	9,418	70.2	9.1
Liberal	Norman Kent	2,147	16.0	-10.0
New Democratic	Cathy Harrop	1,311	9.8	3.4
Independent	Cory Morgan	538	4.0	–
Total		13,414	–	–
Rejected, spoiled and declined		51	–	–
Eligible electors / turnout		27,228	49.5	-0.4
Progressive Conservative hold		Swing		10.0
Source(s) Source: "Banff-Cochrane Official Results 2001 Alberta general election" (PDF). Elections Alberta.

=== 2004 ===
2004 Alberta general election
Party	Candidate	Votes	%	±%
Progressive Conservative	Janis Tarchuk	4,238	52.75%	-17.46%
Liberal	Ian McDougall	1,648	20.51%	4.51%
Greens	Chris Foote	1,204	14.99%	–
Alberta Alliance	Bob Argent	477	5.94%	–
New Democratic	Melissa Cambridge	467	5.81%	-3.96%
Total		8,034	–	–
Rejected, spoiled and declined		65	–	–
Eligible electors / turnout		21,330	37.97%	-11.48%
Progressive Conservative hold		Swing		-10.98%
Source(s) Source: "Banff-Cochrane Statement of Official Results 2004 Alberta general election" (PDF). Elections Alberta.

=== 2008 ===
2008 Alberta general election
Party	Candidate	Votes	%	±%
Progressive Conservative	Janis Tarchuk	4,727	49.34%	-3.41%
Liberal	Patricia Robertson	2,753	28.74%	8.22%
Green	Dan Cunin	1,353	14.12%	-0.87%
New Democratic	Anne Wilson	575	6.00%	0.19%
Independent	Zrinko R. Amerl	172	1.80%	–
Total		9,580	–	–
Rejected, spoiled and declined		39	–	–
Eligible electors / turnout		25,778	37.31%	-0.66%
Progressive Conservative hold		Swing		-5.82%
Source(s) Source: The Report on the March 3, 2008 Provincial General Election of the Twenty-seventh Legislative Assembly. Elections Alberta. July 28, 2008. pp. 358–363.

=== 2012 ===
2012 Alberta general election
Party	Candidate	Votes	%	±%
Progressive Conservative	Ron Casey	6,632	41.82%	-7.52%
Wildrose	Tom Copithorne	5,933	37.41%	–
Liberal	Peter Helfrich	2,234	14.09%	-14.65%
New Democratic	Jamie Kleinsteuber	1,059	6.68%	0.68%
Total		15,858	–	–
Rejected, spoiled and declined		135	–	–
Eligible electors / turnout		28,663	55.80%	18.48%
Progressive Conservative hold		Swing		-8.10%
Source(s) Source: "49 - Banff-Cochrane Official Results 2012 Alberta general election". Elections Alberta.

=== 2015 ===
2015 Alberta general election
Party	Candidate	Votes	%	±%
New Democratic	Cameron Westhead	8,426	42.83%	36.15%
Wildrose	Scott Wagner	5,692	28.93%	-8.48%
Progressive Conservative	Ron Casey	5,555	28.24%	-13.58%
Total		19,673	–	–
Rejected, spoiled, and declined		86	–	–
Eligible electors / turnout		36,485	54.16%	-1.64%
New Democratic gain from Progressive Conservative		Swing		4.74%
Source(s) Source: "49 - Banff-Cochrane Official Results 2015 Alberta general election". officialresults.elections.ab.ca. Elections Alberta.

== Senate nominee election results ==
=== 2004 ===
2004 Senate nominee election results: Banff-Cochrane				Turnout 38.05%	
Affiliation	Candidate	Votes	% votes	% ballots	Rank
Progressive Conservative	Bert Brown	3,183	16.46%	50.60%	1
Progressive Conservative	Betty Unger	2,745	14.20%	43.63%	2
Progressive Conservative	Jim Silye	2,360	12.21%	37.51%	5
Progressive Conservative	David Usherwood	2,232	11.54%	35.48%	6
Independent	Link Byfield	2,094	10.83%	33.29%	4
Progressive Conservative	Cliff Breitkreuz	1,853	9.58%	29.46%	3
Independent	Tom Sindlinger	1,588	8.21%	25.24%	9
Alberta Alliance	Michael Roth	1,130	5.84%	17.96%	7
Alberta Alliance	Vance Gough	1,109	5.74%	17.62%	8
Alberta Alliance	Gary Horan	1,041	5.39%	16.55%	10
Total votes		19,335	100%		
Total ballots		6,291	3.07 votes per ballot		
Rejected, spoiled and declined		1,826			

Voters had the option of selecting four candidates on the ballot.

== Plebiscite district results ==
=== 1948 electrification plebiscite ===
District data for the 1948 electrification plebiscite

Option A	Option B
Are you in favour of the generation and distribution of electricity being continued by the Power Companies?	Are you in favour of the generation and distribution of electricity being made a publicly owned utility administered by the Alberta Government Power Commission?
2,624 64.31%	1,456 35.69%
Province wide result: Option A passed.

=== 1957 liquor plebiscite ===
1957 Alberta liquor plebiscite results: Banff-Cochrane
Question A: Do you approve additional types of outlets for the sale of beer, wine and spirituous liquor subject to a local vote?
Ballot choice	Votes	%
Yes	2,324	78.33%
No	643	21.67%
Total votes	2,967	100%
Rejected, spoiled and declined	37	
6,237 eligible electors, turnout 48.16%
Question B1: Should mixed drinking be allowed in beer parlours in Calgary and the surrounding areas?
Ballot choice	Votes	%
Yes	115	87.12%
No	17	12.88%
Total votes	132	100%
Rejected, spoiled and declined	0	
242 eligible electors, turnout 54.55%

On October 30, 1957, a stand-alone plebiscite was held province wide in all 50 of the then current provincial electoral districts in Alberta. The government decided to consult Alberta voters to decide on liquor sales and mixed drinking after a divisive debate in the legislature. The plebiscite was intended to deal with the growing demand for reforming antiquated liquor control laws.

The plebiscite was conducted in two parts. Question A, asked in all districts, asked the voters if the sale of liquor should be expanded in Alberta, while Question B, asked in a handful of districts within the corporate limits of Calgary and Edmonton, asked if men and women should be allowed to drink together in establishments. Question B was slightly modified depending on which city the voters were in.

Province wide Question A of the plebiscite passed in 33 of the 50 districts while Question B passed in all five districts. Banff-Cochrane voted overwhelmingly in favor of the plebiscite. The district recorded a slightly above average voter turnout, a few points above the province wide 46% average. The landslide in favour of Question A was attributed to recognition of the tourist industry in Banff and the national parks.

Banff-Cochrane also voted on question B1 with a number of residents lying inside the electoral district within the corporate limits of Calgary. Residents voted for mixed drinking with a super majority. Turnout for question B was also quite high.

Official district returns were released to the public on December 31, 1957. The Social Credit government in power at the time did not consider the results binding. However the results of the vote led the government to repeal all existing liquor legislation and introduce an entirely new Liquor Act.

Municipal districts lying inside electoral districts that voted against the plebiscite were designated Local Option Zones by the Alberta Liquor Control Board and considered effective dry zones. Business owners who wanted a license had to petition for a binding municipal plebiscite in order to be granted a licence.

=== Daylight saving plebiscites ===
==== 1967 ====
District data from the 1967 daylight saving plebiscite

Do you favour province-wide daylight saving time?
For	Against
2,323 48.17%	2,499 51.82%
Province wide result: Failed

==== 1971 ====
District data from the 1971 daylight saving plebiscite

Do you favour province-wide daylight saving time?
For	Against
4,034 59.46%	2,750 40.54%
Province wide result: Passed

== Student vote results ==
=== 2004 ===
Participating schools
Holy Spirit Catholic School
Lawerence Grassi Middle School
Mitford Middle School
Our Lady of the Snows

On November 19, 2004, a student vote was conducted at participating Alberta schools to parallel the 2004 Alberta general election results. The vote was designed to educate students and simulate the electoral process for persons who have not yet reached the legal majority. The vote was conducted in 80 of the 83 provincial electoral districts with students voting for actual election candidates. Schools with a large student body that reside in another electoral district had the option to vote for candidates outside of the electoral district than where they were physically located.

2004 Alberta student vote results
Affiliation	Candidate	Votes	%
Green	Chris Foote	107	26.42%
Progressive Conservative	Janis Tarchuk	102	25.19%
Liberal	Ian McDougall	93	22.96%
Alberta Alliance	Bob Argent	54	13.33%
New Democratic	Melissa Cambridge	49	12.10%
Total		405	100%
Rejected, spoiled and declined		16	

=== 2012 ===
2012 Alberta student vote results
Affiliation	Candidate
Progressive Conservative	Ron Casey
Liberal	Pete Helfrich
New Democratic	Jamie Kleinsteuber

== See also ==
- List of Alberta provincial electoral districts
- Canadian provincial electoral districts
