= Miranda Rosin =

Canadian politician (born c. 1995)

Member of the Legislative Assembly of Alberta for Banff-Kananaskis
- In office April 16, 2019 – May 29, 2023
- Preceded by: Seat established
- Succeeded by: Sarah Elmeligi

Personal details
- Born: 1994 or 1995 (age 30–31)
- Party: United Conservative Party
- Education: University of Regina

Miranda Rosin (born c. 1995) is a Canadian politician who represented the electoral district of Banff-Kananaskis in the Legislative Assembly of Alberta for the United Conservative Party from 2019 to 2023.

== Political career ==
Rosin was named the UCP's candidate for Banff-Kananaskis on November 1, 2018. She defeated two other challengers for the spot. During her nomination race, she was endorsed by UCP MLAs Leela Aheer, Drew Barnes and Angela Pitt; Conservative MP for Banff-Airdrie Blake Richards; and Canmore town councillor Rob Seeley.

In October 2018, Rosin said at a UCP nomination debate that Alberta needs "to look at a two-tiered system, so that we can get those who have worked hard for their money out of the system if they would like to.” The audio of the exchange was released by Cam Westhead, who at the time was the NDP MLA for Banff-Cochrane, in March 2019. Rosin did not say if she stood by her comments but insisted the UCP would maintain healthcare spending in Alberta.

Rosin defeated Westhead in the 2019 Alberta general election. At the age of 23, Rosin became the youngest MLA elected to the 30th Alberta Legislature.

Rosin served as Alberta’s Parliamentary Secretary for Tourism, Chair of the Select Special Ombudsman and Public Interest Commissioner Search Committee as well as Deputy Chair of the Standing Committee on Private Bills. Previously MLA Rosin has served as Alberta’s representative on the Council of State Governments, on Alberta’s Fair Deal Panel, and on Alberta’s Economic Future & Resource Stewardship Committees since taking office.

Rosin endorsed the leadership campaign of Travis Toews, UCP MLA for Grande Prairie-Waititi and former finance minister, during the 2022 United Conservative Party leadership race. In November 2022, Rosin was named parliamentary secretary of tourism.

Sarah Elmeligi of the NDP defeated Rosin by more than 300 votes during the 2023 Alberta general election. Rosin held the lead in the riding for most of election night, prompting her campaign and media to erroneously call the election in her favour. Rosin had prematurely given a victory speech to supporters and was being interviewed by local media when her campaign manager told her that Elmeligi took the lead.

Rosin said in the interview that she was proud of her record in the riding, particularly her work with the tourism and hospitality community. She said she hoped to make health-care and housing affordability priorities when her campaign manager interrupted the interview.

=== Fair Deal Panel ===
Rosin was named to the Fair Deal Panel on November 13, 2019. The panel was created by Premier Jason Kenney and tasked with exploring ways to give Alberta more leverage when negotiating with the federal government.

The nine-member panel included Tany Yao, the UCP MLA for Fort McMurray-Wood Buffalo; Drew Barnes, who was a UCP MLA for Cypress-Medicine Hat at the time; former Reform Party leader Preston Manning; and former Progressive Conservative MLA and Associate Minister of Electricity and Renewable Energy Donna Kennedy-Glans.

After hosting town hall forums across Alberta, the panel's suggestions pushed for more authority to create its own services and programs supported by the federal government. These included withdrawing from the Canada Pension Plan to create an Alberta Pension Plan and replacing the Royal Canadian Mounted Police with a provincial police service. One suggestion, a referendum on equalization payments in Canada, was held during 2021 Alberta municipal elections.

Rosin said she was proud of the panel's work and approved of its recommendations. She told CKXY-FM that fulfilling the recommendations would represent "a turning point in our history." Rosin said the report was based on feedback from Albertans who said they felt the federal government ignores Alberta's economic needs, despite Alberta's economic contributions to Canada. Ignoring the recommendations would contribute to economic and political support for Alberta separatism, she said.

Opposition Leader Rachel Notley criticized the panel's suggestions as unrealistic and outside the scope of the provincial government. Barnes was also critical of the panel's final recommendations. He said they would not solve feelings of Western alienation in Alberta, and said Albertans should pursue separating from Canada if the recommendations were ignored.

=== Opposition to the Springbank Dam ===
Rosin opposed the Springbank Dam, a $423-million project designed to displace high waters from the Elbow River into an off-stream reservoir in Springbank, located west of Calgary. The project was also opposed by Springbank landowners when it was proposed in 2013. The Stoney Nakoda First Nation wanted the reservoir moved further upstream.

While the UCP supported the project, Rosin said in a May 2019 letter to Transportation Minister Ric McIver that the Alberta government's consultations with the residents of Springbank, Redwood Meadows and the Tsuu T’ina First Nation were insufficient. Rosin and other residents opposed to the dam had concerns about air and water quality, silt and debris from the dry dam, and impacts on the community and landowners. Rosin told the Rocky Mountain Outlook that she hoped to convince the UCP caucus that a McLean Creek Dam would be a better flood mitigation project for the region.

Despite Rosin's objections, the Springbank Dam project was approved in June 2021. Rosin said she wished a different site would have been chosen, but she hoped the construction of berms in Bragg Creek would provide constituents with adequate protection from flooding.

=== Role as Parliamentary Secretary for Tourism ===
Premier Danielle Smith appointed Rosin to parliamentary secretary of tourism in November 2022.

Shortly after assuming the role, she told media her priorities would be securing proper funding for Travel Alberta, improving economic recovery for the sector following impacts from the COVID-19 pandemic, and new growth opportunities for recreation and hospitality.

Rosin told CKXY-FM's Cochrane Now that the position "is the exact portfolio that I've been hoping to hold at some point in my career."

She defended the Kananaskis Conservation Pass, a daily or annual pass that must be purchased to enter Kananaskis Country and the Bow Valley Corridor. The pass was created to fund conservation and maintenance projects in the area. Critics, including the NDP and local conservation groups, said the pass was having few impacts on protecting local wildlife.

Rosin introduced Bill 208 in the Alberta legislature on March 23. The bill would have created a special designation of the Municipal Government Act for tourism communities. This would give these communities help to deal with pressures the tourism industry has on the residents and visitors, such as housing and infrastructure maintenance. The bill was praised by the mayors of Banff and Canmore.

The bill reached the floor of the Alberta legislature, but the lottery system for MLAs meant the bill did not arrive until the last day of the spring session. The bill was shelved because it did not have enough time to pass. Rosin hoped to pursue the issue had she been re-elected.

=== Alberta's response to the COVID-19 pandemic ===
Tourism is the top industry in Rosin's electoral district, and the industry suffered financially throughout the pandemic. In April 2020, she told The Globe and Mail that unemployment in Banff had peaked at 85% after restrictions on public spaces and travelling were introduced. While Rosin urged constituents and businesses to follow public health restrictions introduced by the Alberta government, she was also critical to her government's response to the COVID-19 pandemic.

That same month, Banff became a COVID-19 hotspot along with Fort McMurray. Political leaders in both communities blamed the spread of the virus on their transient workforces and a large, young population that at the time was not eligible for COVID-19 vaccines. Rosin joined political and business leaders in both communities in calling for additional health care support and access to COVID-19 vaccinations, which at the time was limited to immunocompromised individuals and adults who were at least 40 years old. More vaccines were diverted to both communities by the end of April.

In the early stages of the COVID-19 pandemic, Rosin was accused of downplaying the seriousness of covid in November 2020 when constituents received a political mailer from Rosin claiming the "worst of the COVID-19 pandemic" was over. Rosin later wrote on her Facebook page that the newsletter was sent in the early fall of 2020 when active COVID-19 cases in Alberta were fewer than 2,000. Mayor John Borrowman of Canmore told CTV News that in a conversation with Rosin, the MLA told him the flyer's distribution was "intentional."

In a guest column published in the High Country News on January 6, 2021, Rosin said "nearly every democratic society in the Western world" responded to the pandemic by choosing to "gamble away their longstanding values of freedom and self-determination in surrender to fear and uncertainty."

On April 7, 2021, Rosin was one of 18 UCP MLAs who signed a letter opposing new public health restrictions one day after they were announced by Kenney. The restrictions included closing indoor dining, libraries, and most gym and fitness activities. Rosin told CBC News that the Alberta government should instead lobby the federal government for a speedier supply of vaccines. Rosin's support was opposed by Borrowman and Banff mayor Karen Sorensen.

On her personal website, Rosin wrote in September 17, 2021 that Alberta's Restriction Exemption Program was not perfect or ideal but was better than similar programs in other provinces. When the vaccine passport program ended on February 9, 2022, she said she never supported the program and was happy to see it end.

== Controversies ==
In October 2020, Rosin told a constituent that the Alberta government is not creating COVID-19 "concentration camps" after that person wrote on her public Facebook page "STOP the COVID concentration camps." Rosin added that "if the rumours are true, those are being set up by the Federal Government and not us." Rosin apologized for how she responded and said that as someone with Jewish ancestry on her grandfather's side, she should have denounced the individual's use of the term "concentration camps."

In December 2020, Rosin mailed Christmas cards to constituents with the official emblem of the Legislature of Alberta. The cards quoted the King James Bible's version of Isaiah 9:6, which reads “For unto us a child is born, unto us a son is given: and the government shall be upon his shoulder: and his name shall be called Wonderful, Counsellor, The mighty God, the everlasting Father, The Prince of Peace.”

Anna Greenwood-Lee, a Calgary priest with the Anglican Church of Canada and a bishop-elect for a diocese in British Columbia, said quoting a bible verse that uses "government" in its translation "sounds a bit like they’re saying they have divine sanction." A UCP spokesperson told the Edmonton Journal that Greenwood-Lee's interpretation “sounds like something spurred on by the tin-foiled hat crowd on Twitter." The UCP responded by saying that "It is also a Christian festival, so we wished Christians celebrating a Merry Christmas as well with reference to a text many of the Christian faith find comfort in".

In early January 2021, six UCP MLAs were demoted for travelling internationally at a time when the Alberta government was asking people not to travel because of the COVID-19 pandemic. Rosin told Mountain FM she had visited family in Saskatchewan for Christmas, but said no rules were broken because she lived alone. Alberta's restrictions at the time allowed people living alone to visit another household during the holiday season. Rosin was not punished by Kenney.

On January 29, 2021, it was reported by Progress Report that Rosin improperly claimed $796 worth of meal per-diems.

On February 10, 2023, the UCP Banff-Kananaskis Constituency Association was found in contravention of s. 134(2) of the Election Act for placing a billboard advertisement that did not include the required authorization statement stating the sponsor's name and contact information.

== Personal life ==
Rosin earned a Bachelor of Business Administration in Marketing and International Business from the University of Regina, and also studied at both the Shanghai Lixin University of Commerce and the Universite de Sherbrooke.

Before her election in 2019, Rosin worked for Coca-Cola's Canadian operations in a managerial role. She is a former vice-president with the Canmore Young Adult Network and has volunteered with Habitat for Humanity and the Regina Food Bank. She plays the oboe, is a seamstress and is an active alpine skier. Her partner is Morgan Nagel, mayor of Cochrane .

Rosin's ancestry is German Canadian through her great-grandmother and Jewish through her grandfather. Her great-uncle participated in the Normandy landings, but two of her grandmother's uncles spent three years in an internment camp in Kananaskis during the Second World War. Her Jewish ancestors who did not move to Canada are assumed to have been murdered in the Holocaust.

== Electoral history ==
=== 2023 general election ===
2023 Alberta general election: Banff-Kananaskis
| Party | Candidate | Votes | % | ±% |
|---|---|---|---|---|
| New Democratic | Sarah Elmeligi | 11,562 | 49.70 | +7.67 |
| United Conservative | Miranda Rosin | 11,259 | 48.40 | -2.94 |
| Green | Regan Boychuk | 336 | 1.44 | – |
| Solidarity Movement | Kyle Jubb | 105 | 0.45 | – |
| Total | | 23,262 | 98.93 | – |
| Rejected and declined | | 252 | 1.07 | |
| Turnout | | 23,514 | 67.49 | |
| Eligible voters | | 34,841 | | |
| New Democratic gain from United Conservative | | Swing | | ▲5.31 |
Source(s) Source: Elections Alberta

=== 2019 general election ===
2019 Alberta general election: Banff-Kananaskis
| Party | Candidate | Votes | % | ±% | Expenditures |
|---|---|---|---|---|---|
| United Conservative | Miranda Rosin | 10,859 | 51.34 | -7.76 | $82,111 |
| New Democratic | Cameron Westhead | 8,890 | 42.03 | +3.50 | $59,158 |
| Alberta Party | Brenda Stanton | 941 | 4.45 | +4.41 | $7,334 |
| Liberal | Gwyneth Midgley | 228 | 1.08 | +0.83 | $500 |
| Alberta Independence | Anita Crowshoe | 154 | 0.73 | – | $1,818 |
| Independent | Dave Phillips | 80 | 0.38 | – | $500 |
| Total | | 21,152 | 98.48 | – | |
| Turnout | | 21,479 | 68.74 | | |
| Eligible voters | | 31,246 | | | |
| United Conservative notional hold | | Swing | | -5.63 | |
Source(s) Source: Elections Alberta Note: Expenses is the sum of "Election Expenses", "Other Expenses" and "Transfers Issued". The Elections Act limits "Election Expenses" to $50,000.
