= Sarah Elmeligi =

Canadian politician

Sarah Elmeligi MLA

Member of the Legislative Assembly of Alberta for Banff-Kananaskis
- Incumbent
- Assumed office May 29, 2023
- Preceded by: Miranda Rosin

Personal details
- Born: March 29, 1976 (age 50) Calgary, Alberta, Canada
- Party: NDP
- Education: Central Queensland University (PhD); University of Northern British Columbia (MSc); University of Alberta (BSc)
- Occupation: Conservationist, businessperson, author, biologist

Sarah Elmeligi (born March 29, 1976) is a member of the Alberta New Democratic Party representing the riding of Banff-Kananaskis, succeeding UCP MLA Miranda Rosin. She is the only NDP MLA to represent a predominantly rural riding. As of June 21, 2024, she serves as the Official Opposition critic for Tourism, Sports and Recreation as well as for Environment, Parks and Climate.

== Electoral history ==
=== 2023 general election ===
2023 Alberta general election: Banff-Kananaskis
Party	Candidate	Votes	%	±%
New Democratic	Sarah Elmeligi	11,562	49.70	+7.67
United Conservative	Miranda Rosin	11,259	48.40	-2.94
Green	Regan Boychuk	336	1.44	–
Solidarity Movement	Kyle Jubb	105	0.45	–
Total		23,262	98.93	–
Rejected and declined		252	1.07	
Turnout		23,514	67.49	
Eligible voters		34,841		
New Democratic gain from United Conservative		Swing		+5.31
Source(s) Source: Elections Alberta
