= Ron Casey (Canadian politician) =

Canadian politician

MLA for Banff-Cochrane
- In office 2012–2015
- Preceded by: Janis Tarchuk
- Succeeded by: Cam Westhead

Personal details
- Born: c. 1950 (age 75–76) Ontario, Canada
- Party: Alberta Party
- Other political affiliations: Progressive Conservative (former)
- Occupation: electrician, politician

Ron Casey (born c. 1950) is a Canadian politician who was an elected member to the Legislative Assembly of Alberta representing the electoral district of Banff-Cochrane from 2012 to 2015.

He later joined the Alberta Party.

== Electoral history ==
2012 Alberta general election: Banff-Cochrane
Party	Candidate	Votes	%	±%
Progressive Conservative	Ron Casey	6,632	41.82%	-7.52%
Wildrose	Tom Copithorne	5,933	37.41%	–
Liberal	Peter Helfrich	2,234	14.09%	-14.65%
New Democratic	Jamie Kleinsteuber	1,059	6.68%	0.68%
Total		15,858	–	–
Rejected, spoiled and declined		135	–	–
Eligible electors / turnout		28,663	55.80%	18.48%
Progressive Conservative hold		Swing		-8.10%
Source(s) Source: "49 - Banff-Cochrane Official Results 2012 Alberta general election". Elections Alberta.
