= Alexander Moore (politician) =

Canadian politician

MLA for Cochrane
- In office 1919–1926
- Preceded by: Charles Fisher
- Succeeded by: Robert McCool

Personal details
- Born: October 1, 1874 Lion's Head, Ontario
- Died: March 29, 1952 (aged 77)

Alexander A. Moore (October 1, 1874 – March 29, 1952) was a farmer and a provincial level politician from Alberta, Canada. He was elected to the Legislative Assembly of Alberta in a by-election on November 3, 1919, and served until 1926.

== Political career ==
Moore won a seat in the Legislative Assembly of Alberta in a provincial by-election held in the Cochrane electoral district on November 3, 1919. The by-election was called due to the death of speaker Charles Fisher. He defeated E.V. Thompson, a candidate of the governing Liberals, in a tough race. Thompson had every member of the Cabinet and many back benchers in the Liberal caucus campaign in the district. Moore was selected at a nomination meeting held on July 16, 1919, and campaigned in the district well before the writ was dropped.

With Moore winning the by-election, he became the first member elected under the United Farmers banner, joining two farmer-friendly Non-Partisan League MLAs already in the legislature.

Moore was re-elected in the 1921 Alberta general election.

He served until 1926 before retiring.
