= Janis Tarchuk =

Canadian politician

The Honourable Janis Tarchuk ECA

MLA for Banff-Cochrane
- In office March 11, 1997 – April 23, 2012
- Preceded by: Brian Evans
- Succeeded by: Ron Casey

Personal details
- Born: 1955 or 1956 (age 69–70) Guelph, Ontario
- Party: Progressive Conservative
- Spouse: Byron
- Education: University of Guelph

Janis Tarchuk ECA is a Canadian politician. She was a member of the Legislative Assembly of Alberta, representing the constituency of Banff-Cochrane as a Progressive Conservative.

== Early life ==
Tarchuk has a long history of community involvement. Prior to provincial politics, she chaired and sat on several local health and education boards, and served as an executive member of the Alberta School Boards Association. In addition, she was the director of Jubilee Insurance and a board member of the Alberta Educational Technology and Research Foundation.

Born and raised in Guelph, Ontario, Ms Tarchuk received her bachelor of arts degree in political science from the University of Guelph.

== Political career ==
Tarchuk was first elected on March 11, 1997, and served four terms as the Member of the Legislative Assembly for Banff-Cochrane.

During this time, she chaired several key committees related to economic development, finance, taxation, sustainable development, and health. She also served as Minister of Children and Youth Services and Minister of Children's Services.

Currently Tarchuk is Chair of the Standing Committee on the Alberta Heritage Savings Trust Fund.

She is also on the board of Alberta Research and Innovation Authority, an Alberta Innovates advisory body that provides strategic advice and recommendations to the Government of Alberta on research opportunities, emerging technologies, and policy direction to enhance innovation.

In addition, she is a member of the Cabinet Policy Committee on Education, the Standing Committee on Education, and the Standing Committee on Privileges and Elections, Standing Orders, and Printing.

== Personal life ==
As a resident of the Bow Valley for over 30 years, her personal interests include skiing, hiking, reading and the many local cultural opportunities. Tarchuk and her husband Byron live in Banff and have two grown children.

== Election results ==
1997 Alberta general election: Banff-Cochrane
Party	Candidate	Votes	%	±%
Progressive Conservative	Janis Tarchuk	7,180	61.13%	8.57%
Liberal	Judy Stewart	3,151	26.83%	-6.73%
New Democratic	Jeff Eamon	754	6.42%	-1.99%
Social Credit	Scott Mudford	661	5.63%	–
Total		11,746	–	–
Rejected, spoiled and declined		32	–	–
Eligible electors / turnout		23,646	49.81%	-11.94%
Progressive Conservative hold		Swing		7.65%
Source(s) Source: "Banff-Cochrane Official Results 1997 Alberta general election". Alberta Heritage Community Foundation.

2001 Alberta general election: Banff-Cochrane
Party	Candidate	Votes	%	±%
Progressive Conservative	Janis Tarchuk	9,418	70.2	9.1
Liberal	Norman Kent	2,147	16.0	-10.0
New Democratic	Cathy Harrop	1,311	9.8	3.4
Independent	Cory Morgan	538	4.0	–
Total		13,414	–	–
Rejected, spoiled and declined		51	–	–
Eligible electors / turnout		27,228	49.5	-0.4
Progressive Conservative hold		Swing		10.0
Source(s) Source: "Banff-Cochrane Official Results 2001 Alberta general election" (PDF). Elections Alberta.

2004 Alberta general election: Banff-Cochrane
Party	Candidate	Votes	%	±%
Progressive Conservative	Janis Tarchuk	4,238	52.75%	-17.46%
Liberal	Ian McDougall	1,648	20.51%	4.51%
Greens	Chris Foote	1,204	14.99%	–
Alberta Alliance	Bob Argent	477	5.94%	–
New Democratic	Melissa Cambridge	467	5.81%	-3.96%
Total		8,034	–	–
Rejected, spoiled and declined		65	–	–
Eligible electors / turnout		21,330	37.97%	-11.48%
Progressive Conservative hold		Swing		-10.98%
Source(s) Source: "Banff-Cochrane Statement of Official Results 2004 Alberta general election" (PDF). Elections Alberta.

2008 Alberta general election: Banff-Cochrane
Party	Candidate	Votes	%	±%
Progressive Conservative	Janis Tarchuk	4,727	49.34%	-3.41%
Liberal	Patricia Robertson	2,753	28.74%	8.22%
Green	Dan Cunin	1,353	14.12%	-0.87%
New Democratic	Anne Wilson	575	6.00%	0.19%
Independent	Zrinko R. Amerl	172	1.80%	–
Total		9,580	–	–
Rejected, spoiled and declined		39	–	–
Eligible electors / turnout		25,778	37.31%	-0.66%
Progressive Conservative hold		Swing		-5.82%
Source(s) Source: The Report on the March 3, 2008 Provincial General Election of the Twenty-seventh Legislative Assembly. Elections Alberta. July 28, 2008. pp. 358–363.
