= Robert Milton McCool =

Canadian politician

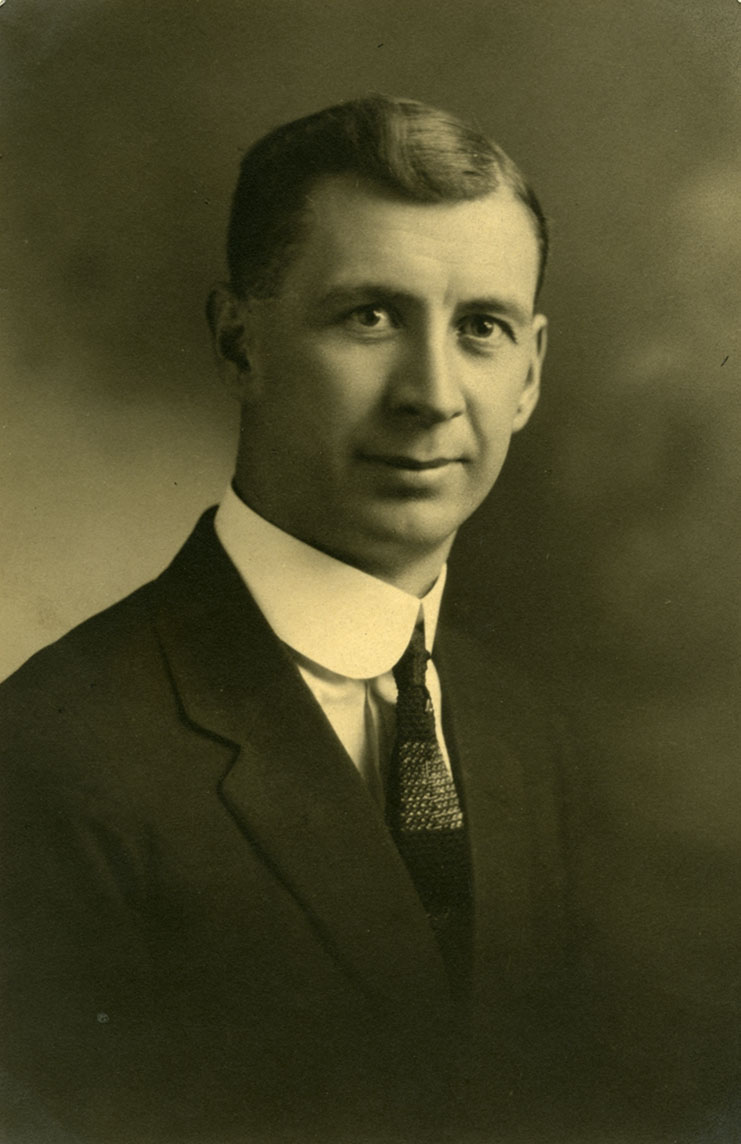

Member of the Legislative Assembly of Alberta
- In office June 28, 1926 – August 22, 1935
- Preceded by: Alexander Moore
- Succeeded by: William King
- Constituency: Cochrane

Personal details
- Born: August 30, 1893 Pilot Mound, Manitoba
- Died: June 22, 1988 (aged 94) Alberta, Canada
- Party: United Farmers
- Spouse: Irene Phillips
- Occupation: farmer and agent

Robert Milton McCool (August 30, 1893 – June 22, 1988) was a Canadian provincial level politician from Alberta. He served as a member of the Legislative Assembly of Alberta for the electoral district of Cochrane from 1926 to 1935.

== Early life ==
Robert Milton McCool was born on August 30, 1893, at Pilot Mound, Manitoba, to James McCool and Catherine Lavina McCool (née McGee). He was educated at Crossfield, Alberta and married Irene Phillips on August 2, 1924.

== Political career ==
McCool ran a seat in the Alberta Legislature in 1926 Alberta general election. He won a hotly contested three-way race that saw him elected on the second count in the Cochrane electoral district to hold the seat for the governing United Farmers of Alberta.

The following election in 1930, McCool would run against Liberal candidate William Laut for the second time in a straight fight for the district. He would be re-elected by a margin of 12 votes. Laut would get defeated running for a third term in office in the 1935 Alberta general election by Social Credit candidate William King.

After his defeat, McCool retired from public service and in 1953 became the manager of the first UFA Cooperative Farm Supply Store in Calgary. He died on June 22, 1988.
