= Greg Stevens (Alberta politician) =

Canadian politician

The Honourable Greg Stevens ECA

MLA for Banff-Cochrane
- In office 1979–1989
- Preceded by: Frederick Kidd
- Succeeded by: Brian Evans

Minister Without Portfolio Responsible for Personnel Administration
- In office 1979–1986

Minister of Culture and Multiculturalism
- In office between 1986 and 1987 – 1989
- Preceded by: Dennis Anderson
- Succeeded by: Doug Main

Personal details
- Born: November 24, 1935 (age 90) Toronto, Ontario, Canada
- Party: Progressive Conservative

Greg Phillip Stevens ECA (born November 24, 1935) was a provincial level politician from Alberta, Canada. He served as a member of the Legislative Assembly of Alberta in the governing Progressive Conservative caucus from 1979 to 1989.

== Political career ==
Stevens ran for a seat to the Alberta Legislature in the reconstituted electoral district of Banff-Cochrane in the 1979 Alberta general election. He won his first term in office with a landslide defeating three other candidates to take the district for the Progressive Conservatives.

Stevens was appointed to the Executive Council of Alberta by Premier Peter Lougheed as Minister Without Portfolio in charge of Personnel Management. He continued to serve that position after winning his second term in office in the 1982 Alberta general election.

When Don Getty became Premier in 1986 Stevens was appointed as Minister of Culture and Multiculturalism. He served that position after being returned handily for his third term the 1986 Alberta general election until his retirement at the dissolution of the Assembly in 1989.
