= Frank Laut =

Canadian politician

Member of the Legislative Assembly of Alberta
- In office March 21, 1940 – July 8, 1944
- Preceded by: New District
- Succeeded by: Arthur Wray
- Constituency: Banff-Cochrane

Personal details
- Born: September 27, 1884
- Died: August 18, 1961 (aged 76)
- Party: Independent
- Spouse(s): Frances Kilpatrick 1913; Isabella Mae Bills 1949
- Children: Albin, Neil and Ross
- Occupation: farmer, politician

Frank Laut (September 27, 1884 – August 18, 1961) was a farmer and a provincial politician from Alberta, Canada. He served as a member of the Legislative Assembly of Alberta from 1940 to 1944 sitting as an Independent.

== Political career ==
Laut ran for a seat to the Alberta Legislature in the 1940 Alberta general election. He ran in the new electoral district of Banff-Cochrane as an Independent candidate. Laut defeated Social Credit incumbent William King in a straight fight taking over 60% of the popular vote.

While serving in the Legislature two of Laut's sons were killed in action in World War II. The Assembly unanimously passed a motion moved by the Independent leader James Walker expressing deepest sorrow and regret for his loss.

Laut ran for a second term in the 1944 Alberta general election. He won the popular vote in the three way race on the first count. However, Laut did not have a clear majority as he only won 39% of the first choice preferences. He was defeated by Social Credit candidate Arthur Wray on the second count.

Laut ran for a third time in the 1948 Alberta general election. The race was hotly contested as he faced King and Wray. Laut finished second on the first count, the second choice preferences of King gave Wray the majority he needed to win.
