= Clarence Copithorne =

Canadian politician

Member of the Legislative Assembly of Alberta
- In office 1967–1975
- Preceded by: Frank Gainer
- Succeeded by: Frederick Kidd
- Constituency: Banff-Cochrane

Minister of Highways and Transport
- In office September 10, 1971 – March 1975
- Preceded by: Gordon Taylor
- Succeeded by: Hugh Horner

Personal details
- Born: November 12, 1920 Cochrane, Alberta
- Died: June 4, 1979 (aged 58) Cochrane, Alberta
- Party: Progressive Conservative

Clarence Copithorne (November 12, 1920 – June 4, 1979) was a provincial level politician from Alberta, Canada. He served as a member of the Legislative Assembly of Alberta from 1967 to 1975 sitting as an Independent and later with the Progressive Conservative caucus in both opposition and government. During his time in office he served as a cabinet minister in the government of Peter Lougheed from 1971 to 1975.

== Political career ==
Copithorne ran for a seat to the Alberta Legislature in the 1967 Alberta general election. He ran in the electoral district of Banff-Cochrane as an independent candidate and won defeating two other candidates in a hotly contested race, including future MLA Roy Wilson.

On March 27, 1969, Copithorne entered a hamburger into the official record of a debate, to protest the quality of the food in the legislature's cafeteria. The hamburger remains in the legislative library.

On April 15, 1970 Copithorne joined the Progressive Conservative caucus giving up his independent status. He ran for re-election in the 1971 Alberta general election as a Progressive Conservative candidate. He increased his popular vote and held the district defeating two other candidates. His win would help the Progressive Conservatives form government that year.

After the election Premier Peter Lougheed rewarded Copithorne by appointing him to the Executive Council of Alberta to serve as the Minister of Highways and Transport.

Copithorne helped develop a plan to create Kananaskis Country in his district.

He retired from the Alberta Legislature and his cabinet position at dissolution in 1975.
