= Banff-Kananaskis =

Provincial electoral district in Alberta, Canada

Alberta electoral district
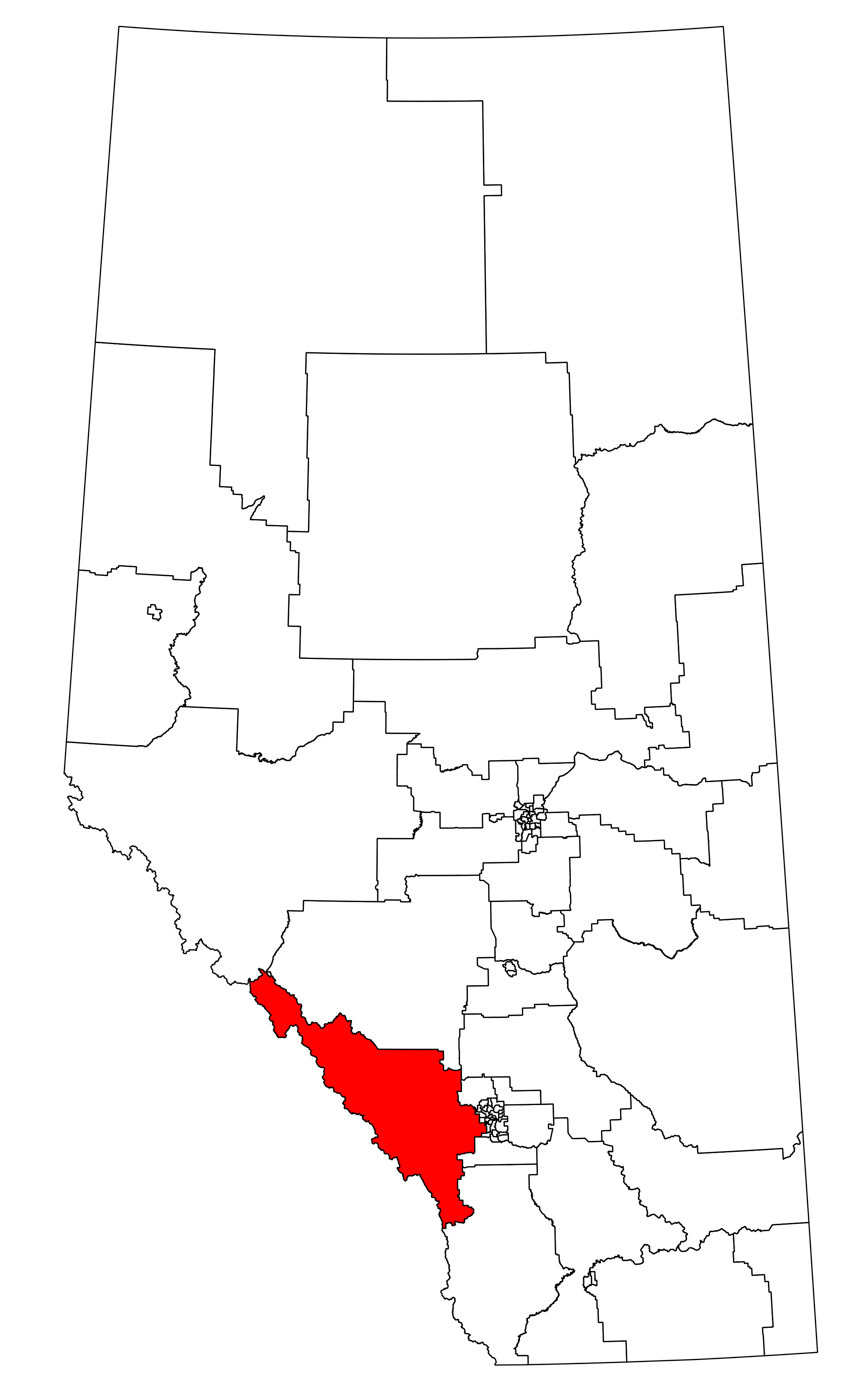
- Banff-Kananaskis within Alberta (2017 boundaries).

Provincial electoral district
- Legislature: Legislative Assembly of Alberta
MLA
Sarah Elmeligi
New Democratic
- District created: 2017
- First contested: 2019
- Last contested: 2023

Demographics
- Population (2016): 46,824
- Area (km²): 15,939
- Pop. density (per km²): 2.9
- Census division(s): 6, 15
- Census subdivision(s): Banff, MD of Bighorn, Canmore, MD of Foothills, ID #9, Kananaskis ID, Rocky View, Stoney, Tsuu T'ina

Banff-Kananaskis is a provincial electoral district in Alberta, Canada. The district is one of 87 districts mandated to return a single member (MLA) to the Legislative Assembly of Alberta using the first past the post method of voting. It was contested for the first time in the 2019 Alberta election.

== Geography ==
The district is located in Alberta's Rocky Mountains and the adjacent foothills west of Calgary. Its largest communities are Banff and Canmore, and it contains the entirety of Banff National Park and Kananaskis Country, for which it is named. Stretching east to Calgary's border, some farming communities are also included, as well as the Treaty 7 communities of the Tsuu T'ina Nation and the Îyârhe Nakoda's Stoney Reserves.

== History ==
Members for Banff-Kananaskis
Assembly	Years	Member	Party
See Banff-Cochrane 1940–2019
30th	2019–2023	Miranda Rosin	UCP
31st	2023–present	Sarah Elmeligi	NDP

The district was created in 2017 when the Electoral Boundaries Commission recommended moving the city of Cochrane to the new riding of Airdrie-Cochrane, requiring a new name for Banff-Cochrane. The district gained small areas to the south and west from Airdrie, Chestermere-Rocky View and Livingstone-Macleod, including the entirety of Kananaskis Country. The commission also decided to join the Stoney Reserves and Tsuu T'ina Reserve into the same district for representation purposes. In 2017, the Banff-Kananaskis electoral district had a population of 46,824, which was slightly above the provincial average of 46,803 for a provincial electoral district.

In the 2019 Alberta general election, United Conservative Party candidate Miranda Rosin was elected with 51 per cent of the vote, defeating New Democratic Party incumbent candidate Cam Westhead with 42 per cent of the vote, and four other candidates.

In the 2023 Alberta general election, Miranda Rosin was unseated by the NDP candidate Sarah Elmeligi, the NDP's only win in rural Alberta.

== Electoral results ==
=== 2023 ===
2023 Alberta general election
Party	Candidate	Votes	%	±%
New Democratic	Sarah Elmeligi	11,562	49.70	+7.67
United Conservative	Miranda Rosin	11,259	48.40	-2.94
Green	Regan Boychuk	336	1.44	–
Solidarity Movement	Kyle Jubb	105	0.45	–
Total		23,262	98.93	–
Rejected and declined		252	1.07	
Turnout		23,514	67.49	
Eligible voters		34,841		
New Democratic gain from United Conservative		Swing		+5.31
Source(s) Source: Elections Alberta

=== 2019 ===
2019 Alberta general election
Party	Candidate	Votes	%	±%	Expenditures
United Conservative	Miranda Rosin	10,859	51.34	-7.76	$82,111
New Democratic	Cameron Westhead	8,890	42.03	+3.50	$59,158
Alberta Party	Brenda Stanton	941	4.45	+4.41	$7,334
Liberal	Gwyneth Midgley	228	1.08	+0.83	$500
Alberta Independence	Anita Crowshoe	154	0.73	–	$1,818
Independent	Dave Phillips	80	0.38	–	$500
Total		21,152	98.48	–	
Turnout		21,479	68.74		
Eligible voters		31,246			
United Conservative notional hold		Swing		-5.63	
Source(s) Source: Elections Alberta Note: Expenses is the sum of "Election Expenses", "Other Expenses" and "Transfers Issued". The Elections Act limits "Election Expenses" to $50,000.

=== 2015 ===
Redistributed results, 2015 Alberta election
New Democratic	6,615	38.53
Progressive Conservative	5,886	34.28
Wildrose	4,260	24.81
Green	144	0.84
Liberal	43	0.25
Alberta Party	7	0.04
Independents	214	1.25
Source(s) Source: Ridingbuilder

== See also ==
- List of Alberta provincial electoral districts
- Canadian provincial electoral districts
