= Cam Westhead =

Canadian politician and operating room nurse

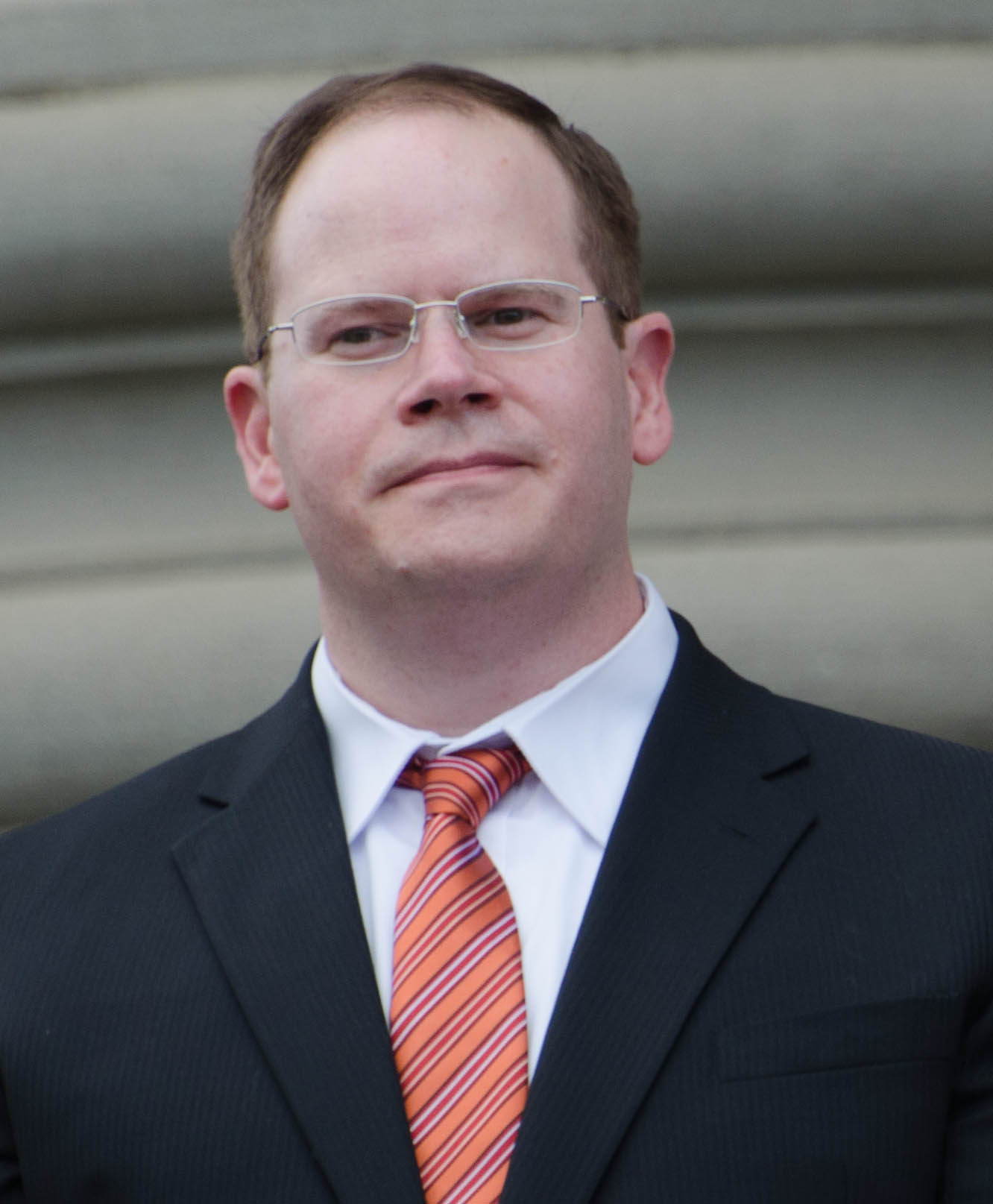
- Westhead in 2015

Member of the Legislative Assembly of Alberta for Banff-Cochrane
- In office May 5, 2015 – March 19, 2019
- Preceded by: Ron Casey
- Succeeded by: district abolished

Personal details
- Born: 1977 (age 48–49) Oshawa, Ontario
- Party: Alberta New Democratic Party
- Education: University of Toronto, Nipissing University
- Occupation: Registered Nurse

Warren Cameron Westhead (born 1977) is a former Canadian politician and current operating room nurse who served one term in the Legislative Assembly of Alberta, representing the electoral district of Banff-Cochrane. He was elected as the second vice president of United Nurses of Alberta in October 2019, where he served until October 2024.

== Electoral history ==
=== 2019 general election ===
2019 Alberta general election: Banff-Kananaskis
Party	Candidate	Votes	%	±%	Expenditures
United Conservative	Miranda Rosin	10,859	51.34	-7.76	$82,111
New Democratic	Cameron Westhead	8,890	42.03	+3.50	$59,158
Alberta Party	Brenda Stanton	941	4.45	+4.41	$7,334
Liberal	Gwyneth Midgley	228	1.08	+0.83	$500
Alberta Independence	Anita Crowshoe	154	0.73	–	$1,818
Independent	Dave Phillips	80	0.38	–	$500
Total		21,152	98.48	–	
Turnout		21,479	68.74		
Eligible voters		31,246			
United Conservative notional hold		Swing		-5.63	
Source(s) Source: Elections Alberta Note: Expenses is the sum of "Election Expenses", "Other Expenses" and "Transfers Issued". The Elections Act limits "Election Expenses" to $50,000.

=== 2015 general election ===
2015 Alberta general election: Banff-Cochrane
Party	Candidate	Votes	%	±%
New Democratic	Cameron Westhead	8,426	42.83%	36.15%
Wildrose	Scott Wagner	5,692	28.93%	-8.48%
Progressive Conservative	Ron Casey	5,555	28.24%	-13.58%
Total		19,673	–	–
Rejected, spoiled, and declined		86	–	–
Eligible electors / turnout		36,485	54.16%	-1.64%
New Democratic gain from Progressive Conservative		Swing		4.74%
Source(s) Source: "49 - Banff-Cochrane Official Results 2015 Alberta general election". officialresults.elections.ab.ca. Elections Alberta.
