= Brian Evans (politician) =

Canadian politician

The Honourable Brian John Evans ECA KC

MLA for Banff-Cochrane
- In office March 20, 1989 – March 10, 1997
- Preceded by: Greg Stevens
- Succeeded by: Janis Tarchuk

Minister of Justice and Attorney General
- In office September 15, 1994 – March 26, 1997
- Preceded by: Ken Rostad
- Succeeded by: Jon Havelock

Personal details
- Born: August 15, 1950 (age 75) Edmonton, Alberta
- Party: Progressive Conservative
- Education: University of Alberta
- Occupation: Lawyer

Brian John Evans ECA KC (born August 18, 1950) is a Canadian lawyer and former provincial level politician from Alberta, Canada. He served as a member of the Legislative Assembly of Alberta from 1989 to 1997. During his time in office, he served as a cabinet minister in the Ralph Klein government.

== Education and law career ==
Born in Edmonton, Alberta, the son of Cecil Road and Margaret Anne (Peters), Evans received a Bachelor of Arts degree in 1971 and a Bachelor of Law degree in 1975 from the University of Alberta. He articled with the Edmonton law firm of Emery Jamieson until opening Canmore, Alberta's first full-time law office in 1976, the year he was called to the Alberta Bar. He was created a Queen's Counsel in 1990.

== Political career ==
Evans was first elected to the Alberta Legislature in the 1989 Alberta general election. He defeated two other candidates to win his first term in office, and hold the Banff-Cochrane electoral district for the Progressive Conservatives. He was re-elected with an increased popular vote and comfortable majority to win his second term in the 1993 Alberta general election defeating four challenging candidates. Evans faced a strong challenge from Liberal candidate Paula Andrews who quadrupled the Liberal vote from the previous election. After winning his second term he was appointed by Premier Ralph Klein to be the Minister of Justice and Attorney General. He retired at dissolution of the Legislature in 1997.

== Return to private life ==
In 1997, Evans became a senior partner with the law firm of Miller Thomson LLP. In 2006, he joined the Werklund Group.
