= William Robert King =

Canadian politician

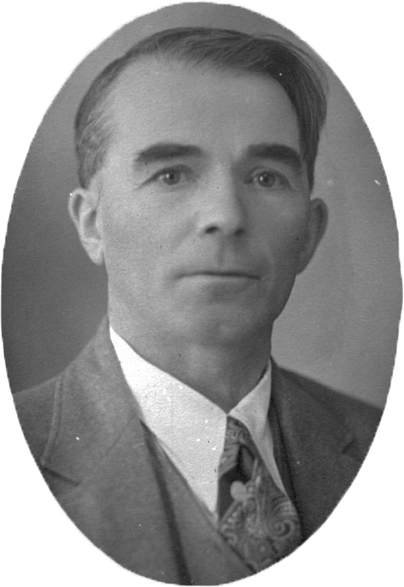

Member of the Legislative Assembly of Alberta
- In office August 22, 1935 – March 21, 1940
- Preceded by: Robert Milton McCool
- Succeeded by: District Abolished
- Constituency: Cochrane

Personal details
- Born: February 9, 1888 Mindemoya, Ontario
- Died: March 12, 1953 (aged 65) Calgary, Alberta
- Party: Social Credit
- Occupation: politician

William Robert King was a provincial level politician from Alberta, Canada. He served as a member of the Legislative Assembly of Alberta from 1935 to 1940 affiliated with the Social Credit caucus for the electoral district of Cochrane.

== Political career ==
King ran for a seat in the 1935 Alberta general election. He won in the electoral district of Cochrane as a candidate for the Social Credit defeating incumbent United Farmers of Alberta MLA Robert McCool.

The riding of Cochrane was an abolished and redistributed into the new riding of Banff-Cochrane for the 1940 Alberta general election. King ran in the new district but was defeated by Independent candidate Frank Laut.

King ran for a third time in the 1948 general election. He faced a hotly contested battle against Laut and incumbent Arthur Wray. King finished in third place on the first count and was defeated. His second choice preferences gave Wray the majority needed to win.
