= Charles W. Fisher (Canadian politician) =

Speaker of the Legislative Assembly of Alberta

Charles Wellington Fisher
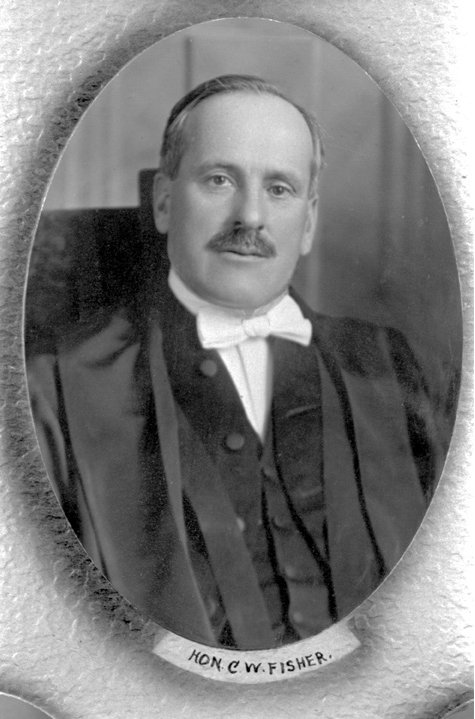

Speaker of the Legislative Assembly of Alberta
- In office March 15, 1906 – May 15, 1919
- Preceded by: New position
- Succeeded by: Charles Pingle

Member of the Legislative Assembly of Alberta
- In office March 22, 1909 – May 15, 1919
- Preceded by: New district
- Succeeded by: Alexander Moore
- Constituency: Cochrane
- In office November 9, 1905 – March 22, 1909
- Preceded by: New district
- Succeeded by: District abolished
- Constituency: Banff

Member of the Legislative Assembly of the Northwest Territories
- In office February 4, 1903 – September 1, 1905
- Preceded by: Arthur Sifton
- Succeeded by: District abolished
- Constituency: Banff

Personal details
- Born: August 4, 1866 Hyde Park, Ontario
- Died: May 5, 1919 (aged 52) Edmonton, Alberta
- Resting place: Union Cemetery, Calgary
- Party: Liberal
- Children: Seven: Sons C. B. Fisher, Richard James Fisher, John Wellington Fisher, Gordon Thomas Fisher; daughters Helen Angela Fisher, Marjorie Louise Fisher, and Muriel Elsie Fisher (Buller)

Charles Wellington Fisher (August 4, 1866 – May 5, 1919) was a Canadian politician who served as the first Speaker of the Legislative Assembly of Alberta.

== Biography ==
Born in Hyde Park, Canada West, now part of London, Ontario. Fisher came to Cochrane from Ontario in 1899, and became the town's leading merchant. In 1907 he married a niece of the Carling family (of Carling Brewery fame), and promised her that they would live in a castle. By way of fulfilling that promise, he built a mansion in Cochrane in 1908 (which became the Just Home Guest Ranch in 1931 and was donated to a Franciscan order in 1948).

In January 1903, Arthur Sifton, the Member of the Legislative Assembly of the Northwest Territories for Banff resigned to become territorial chief justice. In the ensuing by-election, held February 4, Fisher defeated H. J. Richardson to replace him. He served until the district left the Northwest Territories to become part of the new province of Alberta in 1905.

He ran in Banff in Alberta's inaugural election. Politics in the North-West Territories had been conducted on a non-partisan basis but that was not the case in Alberta after provincehood. Fisher aligned himself with the Liberals. In the election, he faced Conservative Robert Brett, who had been Banff's NWT territorial Assemblyman from 1891 to 1899. He more than doubled Brett's vote count on his way to an easy victory.

Fisher was part of a Liberal majority of 23 seats in the 25 seat Legislative Assembly of Alberta, and was one of only seven members with previous legislative experience. In deference to this experience, and as a reward for having beaten Brett, considered a strong opponent, he was elected the first Speaker of the Legislative Assembly of Alberta on March 15, 1906.

He was re-elected in the next three elections, in the new riding of Cochrane, and was re-elected Speaker after each of them. As Speaker, he presided over the tumultuous Alberta and Great Waterways Railway scandal, when he ruled future premier Charles Stewart out of order in his attempt to report a scandalous rumour about fellow Liberal John R. Boyle in the legislature.

Fisher died May 5, 1919, a victim of the 1918 flu pandemic. His death left his Cochrane seat vacant, and in the ensuing by-election the United Farmers of Alberta (UFA) ran a candidate, Alexander Moore, for the first time in their history. He won, and two years later the UFA won a majority government.

Charles Fisher is buried in Calgary's Union Cemetery.

== Electoral record ==
| 1917 Alberta general election results (Cochrane) | | Turnout N.A. | |
| Liberal | Charles Wellington Fisher | 630 | 57.32% |
| Conservative | H.E.G.H. Scholefield | 469 | 42.68% |
| 1913 Alberta general election results (Cochrane) | | Turnout 85.1% | |
| Liberal | Charles Wellington Fisher | 475 | 55.56% |
| Conservative | H.F. Jarrett | 380 | 44.44% |
| 1909 Alberta general election results (Cochrane) | | Turnout 89.7% | |
| Liberal | Charles Wellington Fisher | 627 | 67.56% |
| Conservative | Robert Brett | 301 | 32.44% |
| 1905 Alberta general election results (Banff) | | Turnout 89.7% | |
| Liberal | Charles Wellington Fisher | 421 | 53.70% |
| Conservative | Robert Brett | 363 | 46.30% |
| 1903 by-election results (Banff) | | Turnout N.A. | |
| | Charles Wellington Fisher | 263 | 57.68% |
| | H. J. Richardson | 193 | 42.32% |
