= Cochrane (provincial electoral district) =

Defunct provincial electoral district in Alberta, Canada

Alberta electoral district

Defunct provincial electoral district
- Legislature: Legislative Assembly of Alberta
- District created: 1909
- District abolished: 1940
- First contested: 1909
- Last contested: 1935

Cochrane was a provincial electoral district in Alberta, Canada, mandated to return a single member to the Legislative Assembly of Alberta from 1909 to 1926 using the First Past the Post voting system and using instant-runoff voting from 1926 to 1940.

== History ==
=== Boundary history ===
Cochrane 1909 boundaries
Bordering districts
North	East	West	South
Didsbury, Olds	Gleichen	Rocky Mountain	Okotoks
Legal description from the Statutes of Alberta 1909, An Act respecting the Legislative Assembly of Alberta
riding map goes here		map in relation to other districts in rural Alberta goes here	
Cochrane.—Commencing at the north-east corner of township 28, range 28, west of the 4th meridian; thence west along the north boundary of the twenty-eighth townships to the north-east corner of township 28, range 3, west of the 5th meridian; thence north on the east boundary of township 29, range 3, west of the 5th meridian to the north-east corner of township 29, range 3, west of the 5th meridian; thence west along the north boundary of said township 29, range 3, west of the 5th meridian to the north-east corner of township 29, range 4, west of the 5th meridian; thence north along the east boundary of township 30, range 4, west of the 5th meridian to the north-east corner of township 30, range 4, west of the 5th meridian; thence west along the north boundary of the thirtieth townships to the north-east corner of township 30, range 7 west of the 5th meridian; thence north along the east boundary of township 31, range 7, west of the 5th meridian to the north-east corner of township 31 range 7 west of the 5th meridian; thence west along the northern boundary of the thirty-first townships to the meridian between ranges 9 and 10, west of the 5th meridian; thence south on the said meridian line to the Bow River; thence easterly down stream on the said Bow River to the point where the Kananaskis River flows into the Bow River; thence up the Kananaskis River to the south-west corner of the Stony Indian Reserve; thence north-easterly along the south-easterly boundary of the said Indian Reserve to its intersection with the north boundary of township 24, range 7, west of the 5th meridian; thence east along the north boundary of the 24th townships to the north-east corner of township 24, range 3, west of the 5th meridian; thence north along the east boundary of townships 25 and 26 to the north-east corner of township 26, range 3, west of the 5th meridian; thence east along the north boundary of the 26th townships to the north-east corner of township 26, range 28, west of the 4th meridian; thence north along the eastern boundary of townships 27 and 28, range 28, west of the 4th meridian to the point of commencement.
Note: Boundaries came into force in 1909.

Cochrane 1913 boundaries
Bordering districts
North	East	West	South
Didsbury, Olds	Gleichen	Rocky Mountain	Centre Calgary, North Calgary, Okotoks, South Calgary
Legal description from the Statutes of Alberta 1913, An Act to amend the Act respecting the Legislative Assembly of Alberta
riding map goes here		map in relation to other districts in rural Alberta goes here	
Cochrane.—Commencing at the north-east corner of township 28, range 28, west of the 4th meridian; thence west along the north boundary of the 28th townships to the north-east corner of township 28, range 3, west of the 5th meridian; thence north along east boundary of township 29, range 3, west of the 5th meridian to the north-east corner of said township 29, range 3, west of the 5th meridian; thence west along the south boundary of township 30, range 3, west of the 5th meridian to the north-east corner of township 29, range 4, west of the 5th meridian; thence north along the east boundary of township 30, range 4, west of the 5th meridian to the north-east corner of said township 30, range 4, west of the 5th meridian; thence west along the north boundary of the 30th townships to the line between ranges 6 and 7, west of the 5th meridian; thence north along the east boundary of township 31, range 7, west of the 5th meridian, to the north-east corner of said township 31, range 7, west of the 5th meridian; thence west along the north boundary of the 31st townships to the north-east corner of township 31, range 8, west of the 5th meridian; thence south on the said meridian line between ranges 7 and 8, west of the 5th meridian to the north-east corner of township 23, range 8, west of the 5th meridian; thence east along the north boundary of the 23rd townships to the south-east corner of township 24, range 4, west of the 5th meridian; thence north along east boundary of township 24, range 4, west of the 5th meridian to the north-east corner of said township 24, range 4 west of the 5th meridian; thence east along the north boundary of township 24, range 3, west of the 5th meridian to the north-east corner of said township 24, range 3, west of the 5th meridian; thence north along the meridian line between ranges 2 and 3, west of the 5th meridian, to the north-east corner of township 26, range 3, west of the 5th meridian; thence east along the north boundary of the 26th townships to the meridian line between ranges 27 and 28, west of the 4th meridian; thence north along said meridian line between ranges 27 and 28 west of the 4th meridian to the point of commencement.
Note: Boundaries came into force in 1913.

Cochrane 1921 boundaries
Bordering districts
North	East	West	South
Didsbury, Olds	Gleichen	Rocky Mountain	Calgary, Okotoks
Legal description from the Statutes of Alberta 1921, An Act to Amend The Motor Vehicle Act, The Unearned Increment Tax Act, and Certain other Acts and Ordinances
riding map goes here		map in relation to other districts in rural Alberta goes here	
Note: Boundaries description unchanged from 1913, surrounding districts changed.

Cochrane 1926 boundaries
Bordering districts
North	East	West	South
Didsbury, Olds	Gleichen	Rocky Mountain	Calgary, Okotoks
Legal description from the Statutes of Alberta 1926, An Act to amend the Act respecting the Legislative Assembly of Alberta
riding map goes here		map in relation to other districts in rural Alberta goes here	
Cochrane.—Commencing at the north-east corner of township 28, range 28, west of the 4th meridian; thence west along the north boundary of the 28th townships to the north-east corner of township 28, range 3, west of the 5th meridian; thence north along the east boundary of township 29, range 3, west of the 5th meridian to the north-east corner of said township 29, range 3, west of the 5th meridian; thence west along the north boundary of township 29, range 3, west of the 5th meridian to the north-east corner of township 29, range 4, west of the 5th meridian; thence north along the meridian line between ranges 3 and 4, west of the 5th meridian to the north-east corner of township 30, range 4, west of the 5th meridian; thence west along the north boundary of the 30th townships to the meridian line between ranges 6 and 7, west of the 5th meridian; thence north along the meridian line between ranges 6 and 7, west of the 5th meridian to the north-east, corner of township 31, range 7, west of the 5th meridian; thence west along the north boundary of the 31st townships to the north-east corner of township 31, range 8 west of the 5th meridian; thence south along the meridian line between ranges 7 and 8, west of the 5th meridian and its production across the Stony Indian Reserve to the north-east corner of township 23, range 8, the 23rd townships to the point of its intersection with the Elbow River in township 23, range 2, west of the 5th meridian; thence north-westerly and up stream along the Elbow River to the point of its intersection with the meridian line between ranges 2 and 3, west of the 5th meridian; thence north along the meridian line between ranges 2 and 3, west of the 5th meridian to the north-east corner of section 12, township 25, range 3, west of the 5th meridian; thence east along the north boundaries of sections 7, 8, 9, 10, 11, and 12, in township 25, range 2, west of the 5th meridian and of sections 7, 8, 9, 10, 11 and 12 in township 25, range 1, west of the 5th meridian and of sections 9, 10, 11 and 12 in township 25, range 29 west of the 4th meridian, to the north-east corner of section 12, township 25, range 29, west of the 4th meridian; thence north along the meridian line between ranges 28 and 29, west of the 4th meridian to the north-east corner of township 26, range 29, west of the 4th meridian; thence east along the north boundary of the 26th township to its intersection with the meridian line between ranges 27 and 28 west of the 4th meridian; thence north along the meridian line between ranges 27 and 28, west of the 4th meridian to the point of commencement.
Note: Boundaries came into force in 1926.

Cochrane 1930 boundaries
Bordering districts
North	East	West	South
Didsbury, Olds	Gleichen	Rocky Mountain	Calgary, Okotoks-High River
Legal description from the Statutes of Alberta 1930, An Act to amend the Act respecting the Legislative Assembly of Alberta
riding map goes here		map in relation to other districts in rural Alberta goes here	
Cochrane.—Commencing at the intersection of the meridian line between ranges 27 and 28, west of the 4th meridian, with the north boundary of townships 29; thence south along the said meridian line between ranges 27 and 28, west of the 4th meridian, to the north boundary of township 26 to the meridian line between ranges 28 and 29, west of the 4th meridian: thence south along the said meridian line between ranges 28 and 29, west of the 4th meridian, to the north-east corner of section 12, township 25, range 29, west of the 4th meridian; thence west along the north boundary of sections 12, 11, 10 and 9, in township 25 range 29, west of the 4th meridian and of sections 12, 11, 10, 9, 8, and 7, in township 25, range 1, west of the 5th meridian and of sections 12, 11, 10, 9, and 7 in township 25, range 2 west of the 5th meridian, to the meridian line between ranges 2 and 3, west of the 5th meridian; thence south along the said meridian line between ranges 2 and 3, west of the 4th meridian, to its intersection with the Elbow River; thence south-easterly along the said Elbow River to the north boundary of townships 23; thence west along the said north boundary 23 to the meridian line between ranges 4 and 5, west of the 5th meridian; thence south along the said meridian line between ranges 4 and 5 west the 5th meridian, to the intersection with the Elbow River; thence generally south-westerly and upstream along the Elbow River to the intersection with the meridian line between ranges 7 and 8, west of the 5th Meridian; thence north along the said meridian line between ranges 7 and 8, west of the 5th meridian, produced through the Stony Indian Reserve, to the north boundary of townships 31; thence east along the said north boundary of townships 31 to the meridian line between ranges 6 and 7, west of the 5th meridian; thence south along the said meridian line between 6 and 7, west of the 5th meridian, to the north boundary of townships 30; thence east along the said north boundary of townships 30 to the meridian line between ranges 3 and 4, west of the 5th meridian; thence south along the said meridian line between ranges 3 and 4 west of the 5th meridian, to the north boundary of townships 29; thence east along the said north boundary of townships 29 to the point of commencement.
Note: Boundaries came into force in 1930 and lasted until the district was abolished in 1935.

Members of the Legislative Assembly for Cochrane
Assembly	Years	Member	Party
See Banff, Gleichen and Rosebud electoral districts from 1905-1909
2nd	1909-1913	Charles Fisher	Liberal
3rd	1913-1917	Charles Fisher	Liberal
4th	1917-1919	Charles Fisher	Liberal
4th	1919	Vacant	
4th	1919-1921	Alexander Moore	United Farmers
5th	1921-1926	Alexander Moore	United Farmers
6th	1926-1930	Robert McCool	United Farmers
7th	1930-1935	Robert McCool	United Farmers
8th	1935-1940	William King	Social Credit
See Banff-Cochrane electoral district from 1940-2019

=== Electoral history overview ===
The first election in the Cochrane provincial electoral was held in 1909. The district was created from an amalgamation of three electoral districts. Two of those districts, Rosebud and Banff, disappeared completely.

The election was a hotly contested race between two former members of the Legislative Assembly of the Northwest Territories: incumbent Charles Fisher and future Alberta Lieutenant Governor Robert Brett.

Fisher, who had been serving as the first Speaker of the House since 1906, was re-elected in the new district by a large margin. He held the district for 10 years before he died while still holding office, being re-elected twice more.

The by-election held in the district after Fisher's death saw the district won by Alexander Moore of the United Farmers of Alberta. Moore was re-elected in 1921, and served until 1926. Robert McCool was elected holding the district for the United Farmers. McCool was defeated by Social Credit candidate William King in the 1935 election which saw that party rise to power.

The electoral district was merged with the Rocky Mountain electoral district to become the new district of Banff-Cochrane for the 1940 Alberta general election.

== Election results ==
=== 1909 ===
1909 Alberta general election
Party	Candidate	Votes	%	±%
Liberal	Charles W. Fisher	627	67.56%	–
Conservative	Robert George Brett	301	32.44%	–
Total		928	–	–
Rejected, spoiled and declined		N/A	–	–
Eligible electors / turnout		N/A	N/A	–
Liberal pickup new district.				
Source(s) Source: "Cochrane Official Results 1909 Alberta general election". Alberta Heritage Community Foundation.

=== 1913 ===
1913 Alberta general election
Party	Candidate	Votes	%	±%
Liberal	Charles W. Fisher	475	55.56%	-12.01%
Conservative	Henry F. Jarrett	380	44.44%	12.01%
Total		855	–	–
Rejected, spoiled and declined		N/A	–	–
Eligible electors / turnout		N/A	N/A	–
Liberal hold		Swing		-12.01%
Source(s) Source: "Cochrane Official Results 1913 Alberta general election". Alberta Heritage Community Foundation.

=== 1917 ===
1917 Alberta general election
Party	Candidate	Votes	%	±%
Liberal	Charles W. Fisher	630	57.32%	1.77%
Conservative	Harold E. G. H. Scholefield	469	42.68%	-1.77%
Total		1,099	–	–
Rejected, spoiled and declined		N/A	–	–
Eligible electors / turnout		N/A	N/A	–
Liberal hold		Swing		1.77%
Source(s) Source: "Cochrane Official Results 1917 Alberta general election". Alberta Heritage Community Foundation.

=== 1919 by-election ===
On May 5, 1919, incumbent Charles Fisher died, causing the district to become vacant. On July 15, 1919, the Alberta Non-Partisan League decided to merge with the United Farmers of Alberta.

The United Farmers held a nomination meeting on July 22, 1919. There were a total of three candidates running for the nomination. The meeting was well attended by the farmers in the area and the executive of the United Farmers of Alberta. The chairman of the meeting was former Conservative candidate H.E.G.H. Scholefield. Alexander Moore was selected from a field of three nominees vying for candidacy.

The Liberals chose E.V. Thompson to hold the district, which had been a stronghold for the party. The returns came back showing a seesaw race. Thompson had won a number of polling divisions in towns, while Moore won the division's rural portions. The race was hotly contested and saw the largest voter turnout to date. The by-election would mark the beginning for the end of the Liberal government in Alberta.

Alberta provincial by-election, November 3, 1919 following the death of Charles W. Fisher on May 5, 1919
Party	Candidate	Votes	%	±%
United Farmers	Alexander Moore	850	54.66%	–
Liberal	E. V. Thompson	705	45.34%	-11.99%
Total		1,555	–	–
Rejected, spoiled and declined		N/A	–	–
Eligible electors / turnout		N/A	N/A	–
United Farmers gain from Liberal		Swing		33.33%
Source(s) Source: "Cochrane Official By-election Results". Elections Alberta. May 5, 1919. "Alex Moore wins Cochrane Seat in Bye-election". Calgary Herald. November 4, 1919. pp. 1, 23.

=== 1921 ===
The 1921 Alberta general election held in Cochrane saw another two-way fight. The election was contested by incumbent Alexander Moore who had won a historic by-election victory in the district just two years before.

The Liberals who had fought hard to keep the seat in the by-election hatched a plan to team up with the Conservatives. The two parties held a joint nomination meeting to run a candidate under both banners in the district. The party members nominated Angus McDonald, a popular rancher residing in the district, to oppose Moore and support the administration of Premier Charles Stewart.

The results came back as a landslide for Moore. He easily held his seat and kept the district for the United Farmers defeating Angus. The United Farmers would sweep many rural districts across the province that election to form the second Government of Alberta. Moore increased the percentage of the popular vote to almost 64%.

1921 Alberta general election
Party	Candidate	Votes	%	±%
United Farmers	Alexander A. Moore	961	63.98%	9.32%
Liberal	Angus S. McDonald	541	36.02%	-9.32%
Total		1,502	–	–
Rejected, spoiled and declined		N/A	–	–
Eligible electors / turnout		N/A	N/A	–
United Farmers hold		Swing		33.33%
Source(s) Source: "Cochrane Official Results 1921 Alberta general election". Alberta Heritage Community Foundation.

=== 1926 ===
1926 Alberta general election
Party	Candidate	Votes 1st count	%	Votes final count	±%
United Farmers	Robert Milton McCool	883	47.35%	1,013	-16.64%
Liberal	William Laut	597	32.01%	673	-4.01%
Conservative	F. G. C. Mortimer	385	20.64%	–	–
Total		1,865	–	–	–
Rejected, spoiled and declined		120	–	–	–
Eligible electors / turnout		2,624	75.65%	–	–
United Farmers hold		Swing		-6.31%	
Source(s) Source: "Cochrane Official Results 1926 Alberta general election". Alberta Heritage Community Foundation. Instant-runoff voting requires a candidate to receive a plurality (greater than 50%) of the votes. As no candidate received a plurality of votes, the bottom candidate was eliminated and their 2nd place votes were applied to both other candidates until one received a plurality.

=== 1930 ===
1930 Alberta general election
Party	Candidate	Votes	%	±%
United Farmers	Robert Milton McCool	1,174	50.26%	2.91%
Liberal	William Laut	1,162	49.74%	17.73%
Total		2,336	–	–
Rejected, spoiled and declined		66	–	–
Eligible electors / turnout		3,143	76.42%	0.78%
United Farmers hold		Swing		-7.41%
Source(s) Source: "Cochrane Official Results 1930 Alberta general election". Alberta Heritage Community Foundation.

=== 1935 ===
1935 Alberta general election
Party	Candidate	Votes	%	±%
Social Credit	William Robert King	1,880	54.71%	–
Liberal	William Laut	628	18.28%	-31.47%
United Farmers	Robert Milton McCool	591	17.20%	-33.06%
Conservative	J. A. Tweedle	337	9.81%	–
Total		3,436	–	–
Rejected, spoiled and declined		86	–	–
Eligible electors / turnout		4,007	87.90%	11.47%
Social Credit gain from United Farmers		Swing		17.96%
Source(s) Source: "Cochrane Official Results 1935 Alberta general election". Alberta Heritage Community Foundation.

== See also ==
- List of Alberta provincial electoral districts
- Canadian provincial electoral districts
- Cochrane, Alberta, a town in Southern Alberta
