= Frederick Kidd =

Canadian politician

Frederick Alexander Kidd

Member of the Legislative Assembly of Alberta
- In office 1975–1979
- Preceded by: Clarence Copithorne
- Succeeded by: Greg Stevens
- Constituency: Banff

Personal details
- Born: July 29, 1921 Nordegg, Alberta
- Died: March 22, 1997 (aged 75)
- Party: Progressive Conservative
- Spouse: Helen Kidd
- Occupation: Geologist

Frederick Alexander Kidd (July 29, 1921 – March 22, 1997) was a provincial level politician and Geologist from Alberta, Canada. He served as a member of the Legislative Assembly of Alberta in the governing Progressive Conservative caucus from 1975 to 1979.

== Early life ==
Frederick Alexander Kidd was born in Nordegg, Alberta. He grew up in south western Alberta and became a geologist.

== Political career ==
Kidd ran for a seat to the Alberta Legislature in the 1975 Alberta election. He was elected to represent the renamed electoral district of Banff with a landslide victory over three other candidates. He served in the back benches of the governing Progressive Conservative caucus until 1979. During his service he served on a number of committees. He did not run for a second term in office when the legislature was dissolved in 1979.

He died on March 22, 1997.
