= Tzrifin Underground =

Underground Jewish militant group

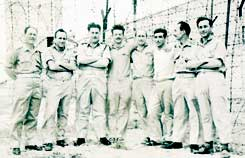
Members of the group posing with prison personnel after being released from prison in 1955. The group's leader, Yaakov Heruti, is second from left.

The Tzrifin Underground, officially the Kingdom of Israel (Hebrew: מלכות ישראל, Malchut Yisrael), was an underground Jewish militant group active in Israel in the 1950s. "Kingdom of Israel" was the name that the group's members used, but it was better known to the Israeli public as the "Tzrifin Underground", after the Tzrifin military base, where its members were put on trial. The group carried out attacks on the diplomatic missions of the Soviet Union and Czechoslovakia in protest against those countries' antisemitic policies, such as the Slánský trial and the Doctors' plot. They also attempted to assassinate German Chancellor Konrad Adenauer with letter bombs, and occasionally shot at Jordanian troops stationed along the border in Jerusalem.

The group's leader, Yaakov Heruti, recruited former Lehi colleagues, as well as adolescents from Revisionist Zionist homes who had been brought up to see Lehi fighters as heroes. Separately, another Kingdom of Israel member, Yaakov Blumenthal, "organized another clique of activists in Jerusalem, most of whom were Orthodox Jews". The group never had more than two dozen members.

== Activities ==
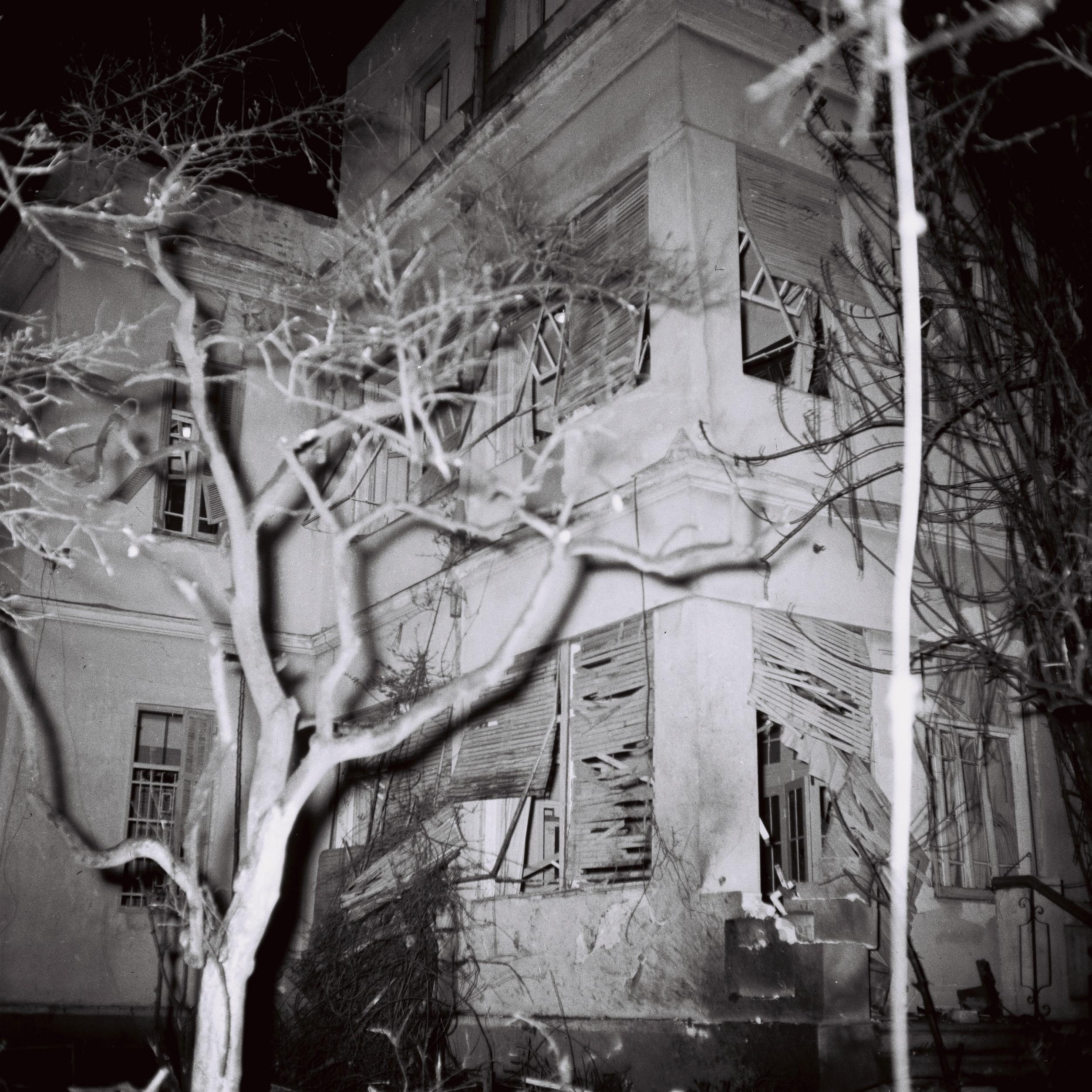
Soviet embassy building after explosion of the bomb

On February 9, 1953, the group planted more than 70 pounds of explosives at the Soviet embassy. The ensuing explosion severely injured the embassy's housekeeper and significantly damaged the embassy building. Two other embassy employees were also lightly hurt, one of them the Soviet ambassador's wife. The USSR cut diplomatic relations with Israel in response. The bomb was planted by Yosef Menkes, who later planned the assassination of Rudolf Kastner.< The sophistication of the bombing led Shin Bet head Isser Harel to believe that former Lehi members were responsible, but an intensive investigation failed to turn up the perpetrators.

In April 1953, a member of the group attacked the violinist Jascha Heifetz for playing music by Richard Strauss. The Tzrifin Underground also attacked the Czechoslovak embassy three times, and sent two letter bombs to West German Chancellor Konrad Adenauer, in protest against the Israeli-German reparations agreement. Sometime after midnight, on March 4, 1957, the men arrived at the Tel Aviv apartment complex building where Rudolf Kastner had been living with his family, and shot him three times. Kastner died from his injuries 11 days later.

Other operations included the burning of non-kosher butcher shops and shooting attacks on Arab Legion outposts near Jerusalem.

== Arrest and trial ==
The group was declared to be a terrorist organization under the Prevention of Terrorism Ordinance that was promulgated in 1948 after the assassination of Folke Bernadotte.

On May 26, 1953, two members of Blumenthal's group, working on their own, were caught planting explosives at the Ministry of Education building in Jerusalem. They wanted to protest the Ministry's role in the government's attempts to secularize religious immigrants from North Africa. The two were carrying detailed lists of Kingdom of Israel members, enabling the authorities to quickly round up the group.

Sixteen members of the group were tried before a military court headed by Benjamin Halevy. The defendants were represented by former Irgun officer and future politician Shmuel Tamir; the trial established him as Israel's "foremost political lawyer". The prosecutor was Haim Cohn. Although the government was unable to prove the group's involvement in the Soviet embassy attack, Halevy nevertheless deemed the group "a severe danger to state security". Heruti was sentenced to ten years in prison; another leader, Shimon Bachar, was sentenced to twelve years; and several others were given sentences ranging from one to seven years. However, two years later, they were freed, and Prime Minister David Ben-Gurion commuted their sentences.
