= Operation Tombola =

British military operation in Italy (1945)

- Part of the Spring 1945 offensive in Italy and the Italian campaign of World War II
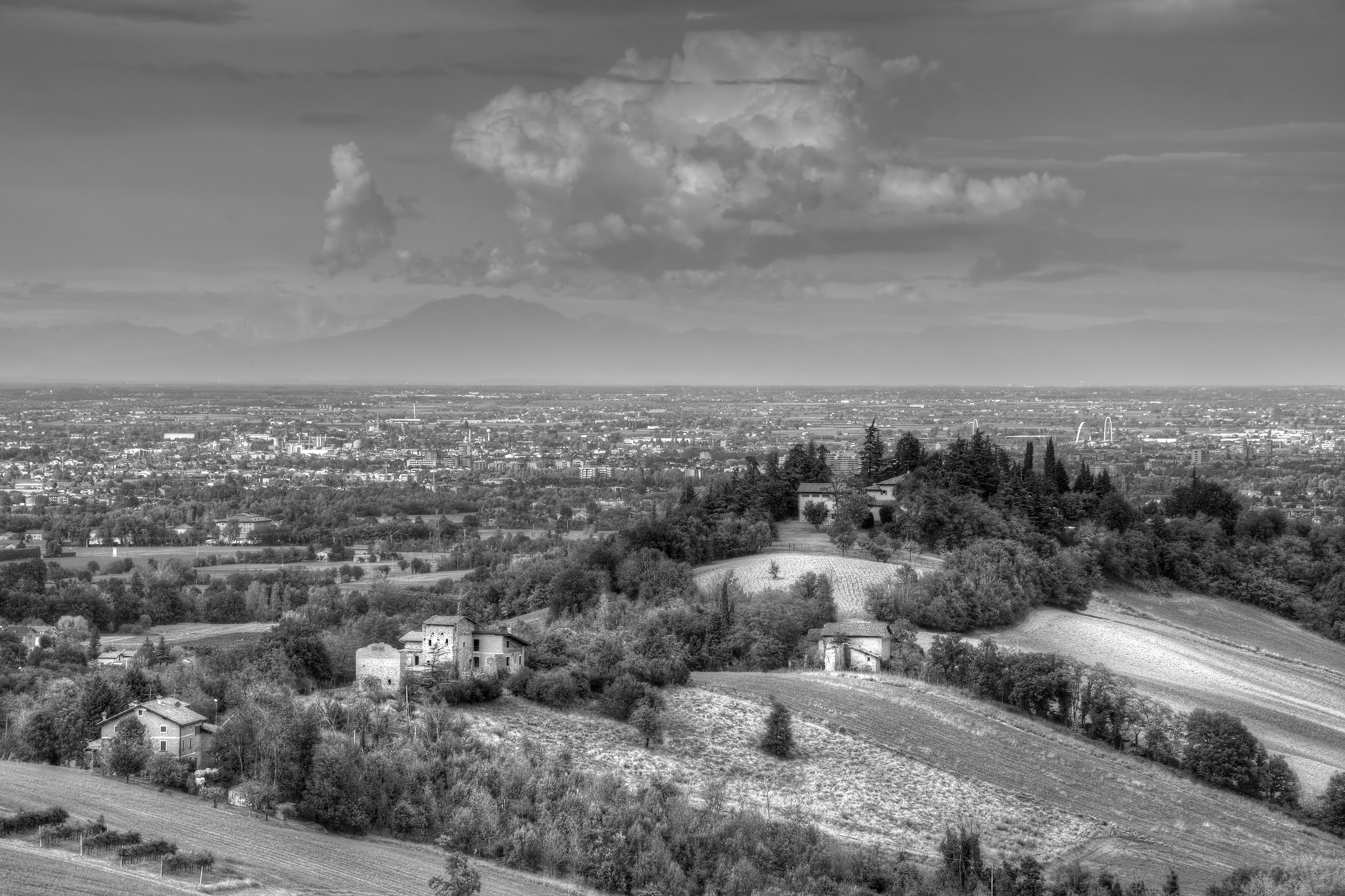
- Albinean Hills (September 19, 2011)
Date	March – April 1945
Location	Regions of Albinea & Reggio Emilia
Result	Allied victory

Belligerents
United Kingdom; Italian partisans	Germany

Commanders and leaders
(United Kingdom) Roy Farran	(Nazi Germany) Friedrich-Wilhelm Hauck

Strength
50 men 2nd Special Air Service; ~50 Italian & Russian partisans	LI Gebirgs Corps (elements)

Casualties and losses
3 killed & 7 Wounded	50–60 killed

During the Second World War, Operation Tombola was a major raid conducted by the 2 Special Air Service, under the command of SAS Major Roy Farran, and Special Operations Executive's Captain Michael Lees. The operation was launched prematurely against orders from the Allied 15th Army Group.

== Planning ==
Fifty men parachuted to the Monte Cusna area (Reggio Emilia) between 4 and 24 March 1945, under command of Major Roy Farran to link up with the SOE mission "Envelope" under the command of Michael Lees. The force liaised Italian Partisans, whose force also included 70 escaped Soviet POWs.

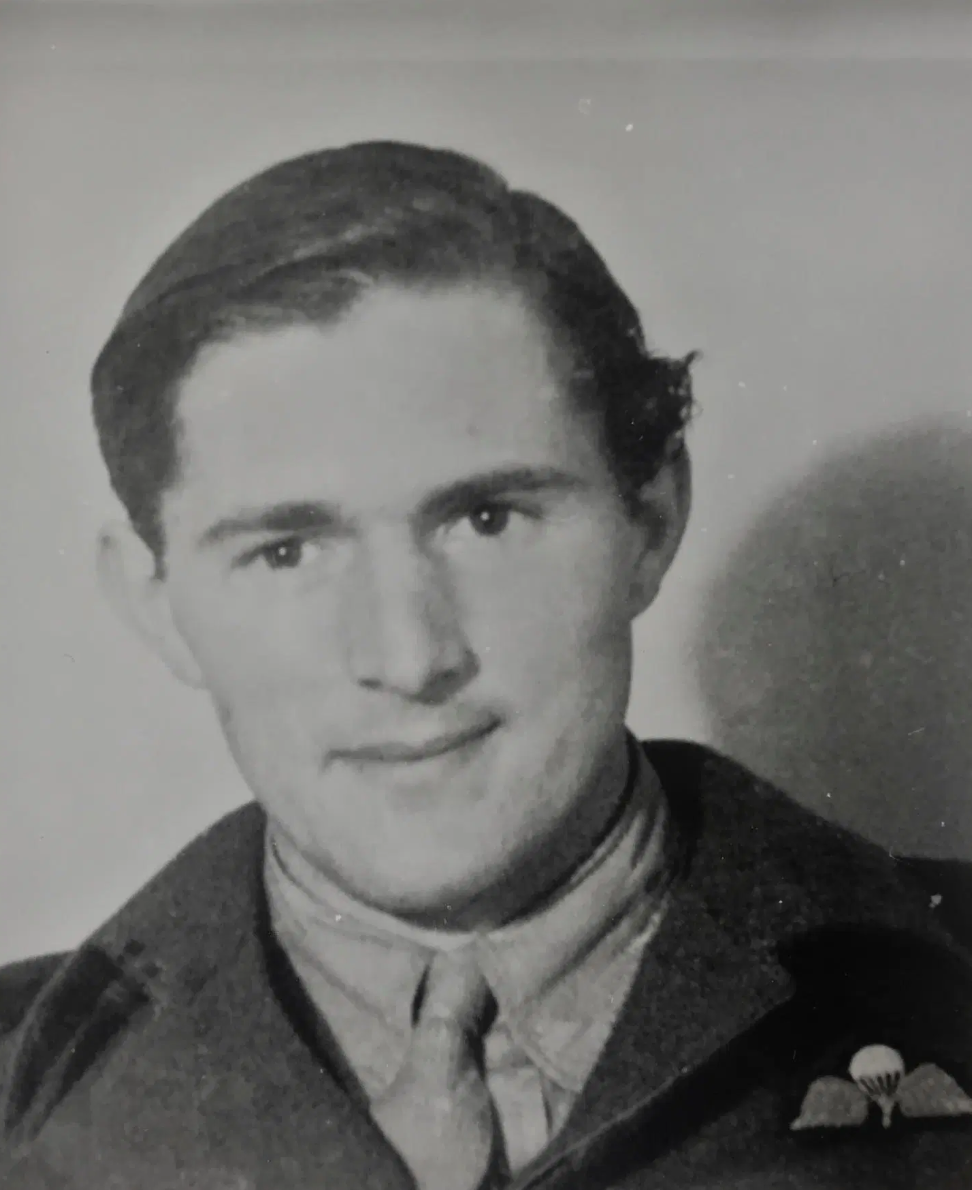
Captain Michael Lees

On 19 March, two German defectors brought Envelope mission information regarding the location of a German Headquarters (they believed 14th Army, but it may have been LI Gebirgs (Mountain) Corps). The German HQ was located in two villas in Botteghe d'Albinea in the hills above Reggio Emilia. Lees' signaled SOE that he and Farran planned to launch an attack.

Later that day, Lees' message was passed to Allied 15th Army Group HQ, who approved the attack, with two caveats. First, Lees and Farran had to reconnoitre and submit a plan of attack, and second, the attack was not to be launched immediately. Instead, it was to be coordinated with Operation Grapeshot, 15th Army's planned Spring offensive that would end with the capitulation of Axis forces in Italy.

Though these orders were received by Lees and Farran, the pair did not incorporate them into their plans. They reconnoitred the enemy HQ and submitted their plan of attack, earmarking 28 March for the operation. This caused alarm at 15th Army Group, with a reply sent "you only have to wait one week after target date...Your scheme will then be correctly time for maximum effort."

This appeal did not succeed, and despite confirming Lees and Farran had received their orders, 15th Army Group tried in vain to reign in Lees and Farran. The only signal received from the two was on 23 March, that ignored 15th Army Group's orders. It read "Confirm we attack 26 March...Plans irrevocable now...."

== Operation ==
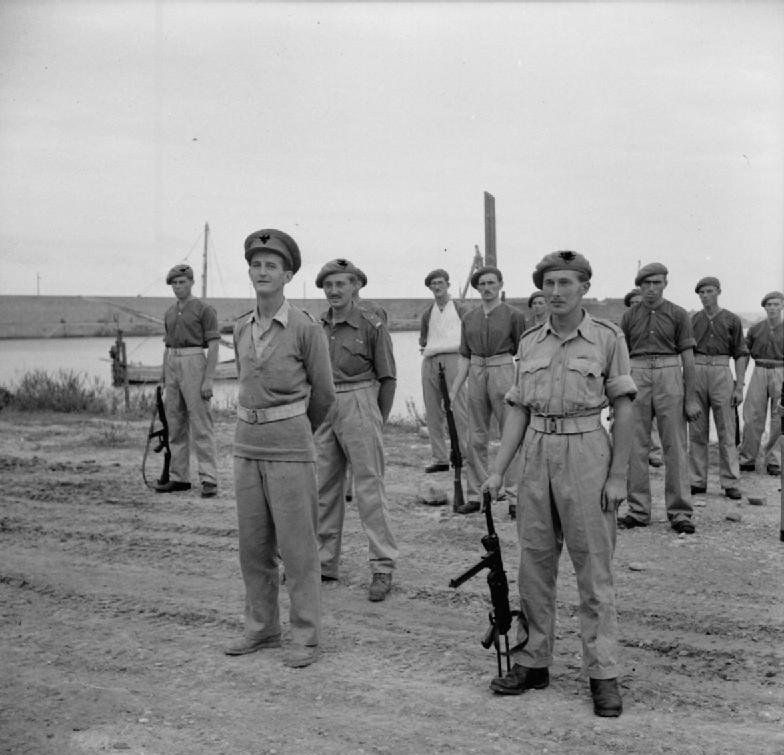
Captain Roy Farran holding a German sub-machine gun in Italy

Farran and Lees began the attack on the night of 27 March, beginning with the sound of a Scottish piper, David Kirkpatrick. Kirkpatrick had volunteered to be dropped into the area, to identify the operation as British – so that reprisals would not be carried out against the local population.

The attack itself was a success, the Germans sustained 50–60 casualties (including an unknown number killed). Three SAS personnel were killed in action at Villa Rossi, and about seven SAS and partisans were wounded (four British, two Italians and a Russian). Among the wounded was Michael Lees, who was evacuated to France, and then England.

Though the attack was a success, it did not cause the disruption it would have, had it coincided with the beginning of Operation Grapeshot. The offensive would not begin for another week.

== Aftermath ==
The Partisans, SOE, and SAS continued operations until 23 April, including raids against roads as Axis installations. Just as important as the 300 or so Germans killed and 200 captured, was the number of Axis defenders moved from other duties to secure the area. A number of Allied airmen, who were being hidden by civilians in the area, were also returned to friendly lines.

Shortly after the war, Farran recommended Lees be gazetted with the Military Cross, for his bravery during the raid. Reviewing the operation, Farran's recommendation was denied, on the grounds that "the value of this operation depended on its timing and Captain Lees with the SAS detachment carried it out prematurely and recklessly, in spite of the express orders from 15th Army Group transmitted by this HQ. But for the gallantry displayed and the fact that Captain Lees was wounded in the action, it is probable that disciplinary action would have been considered."

== Post-War Accounts ==
The commander of the operation, Roy Farran, published his account in the book Operation Tombola (Special Forces Library, Arms and Armour Press, 1986). The BBC series Secret War narrated by Alisdair Simpson (Acorn Media) in 2011 focuses on the exploits of Roy Farran and Michael Lees. The operation is narrated also in the TV mini-series "Great SAS missions" (2004). The Damien Lewis book,"SAS Italian Job", provides a detailed dramatised account of the mission.

A book written in Italian Il bracciale di sterline by Matteo Incerti & Valentina Ruozi (Aliberti April 2011) details for the first time the operations with the use of British, Italian, and German documents. A second book Il paradiso dei folli (Imprimatur-Aliberti 2014) by Matteo Incerti to, focused on the war and post war experience of several participants of this secret mission. "Il suonatore matto" (Imprimatur 2017) also written by Matteo Incerti focused about the life of David 'mad piper' Kirkpatrick. Incerti found documents and memory who prove that the sound of Kirkpatrick's bagpipe and the sacrifice of the three SAS soldiers killed in action (Riccomini, Bolden, Guscott) in Villa Rossi, made the Germans believe that Tombola was a conventional military attack, rather than a "partisan" action. As a result the Nazis didn't inflict reprisals on the civilian population of Albinea.

During the second part of Operation Tombola, on 21 April 1945 action in Torre Maina (Modena) also the 2 SAS paratrooper Justo Balerdi-Robert Bruce was killed in action. He was a Basque antifascist, republican, and a former member of the French Foreign Legion. Bruce was the only Basque to fight with the British SAS in World War II. The story of Justo Balerdi-Robert Bruce appears in the books "Il bracciale di sterline" and "Il suonatore matto".

== See also ==
- Separate entry on Operation Tombola, detailed in the article on Major Roy Farran.
