= Yaakov Heruti =

Lehi militant, terrorist and bomb maker (1927–2022)

- יעקב חרותי
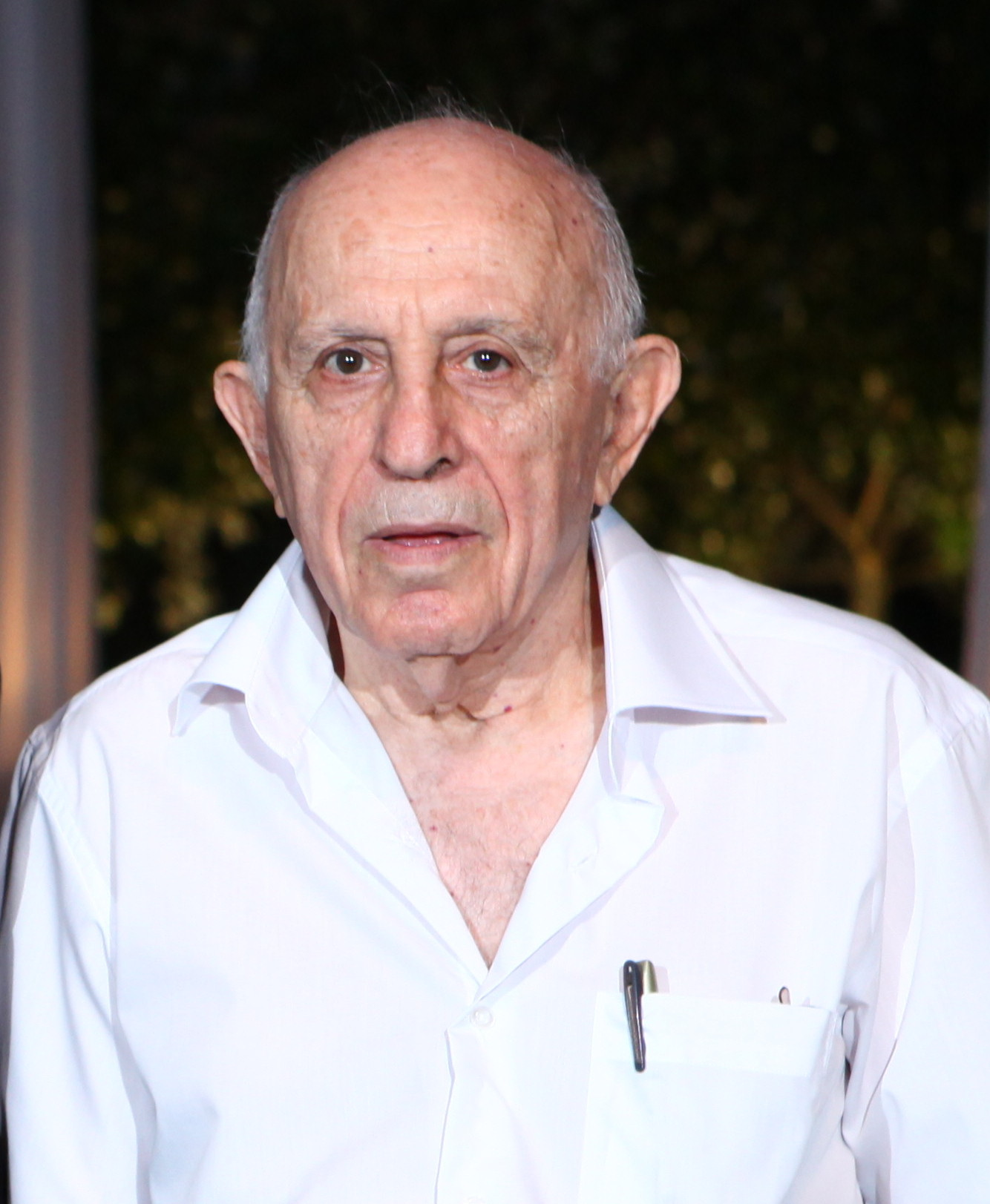
- Yaakov in 2012
- Born: 15 January 1927; Tel Aviv, Mandatory Palestine
- Died: 28 July 2022 (aged 95); Israel
- Occupations: Lawyer, activist, terrorist, and police officer
- Years active: 1950–2022
- Political party: Tehiya, Tsomet and Lehi
- Other political affiliations: Kingdom of Israel

Yaakov Heruti (Hebrew: יעקב חרותי; 15 January 1927 – 28 July 2022) was an Israeli lawyer, far-right activist and Zionist militant. He was a member of the pre-state militant group Lehi, during which he built bombs for the organization and in particular, assembled the letter bomb which was sent to Roy Farran while stationed in Britain as an undercover agent. He later became the leader of the group Kingdom of Israel, which bombed the Soviet embassy in Tel Aviv and carried out other acts of terrorism in the 1950s, for which he served a two-year prison term. He later became involved in politics and settlement activity, participating in the founding of two right-wing political parties and assisting settlers in purchasing land.

== Early life ==
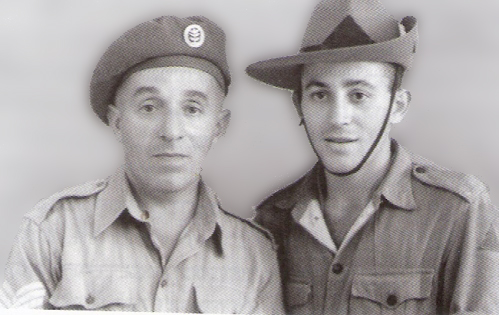
Heruti (right) as a Jewish Settlement Police officer with his father Mordechai, 1945

Heruti was born in Tel Aviv to Polish Jewish parents. His father was a supporter of Mapai. After graduating from the Herzliya Gymnasium he joined the Jewish Settlement Police. As an adolescent, Heruti's political outlook had been shaped by the writings of Lehi founder Avraham Stern and the nationalist poetry of Uri Zvi Greenberg, and he joined Lehi soon after becoming a policeman.

== Lehi ==
Heruti was part of Lehi's technical department and specialized in making bombs, which were first employed against British personnel during the Jewish insurgency in Mandatory Palestine. He devised a new form of explosive for use by Lehi and opened a paint factory which produced explosives along with regular paint. Bell states that he was appointed head of the technical department in 1945. In April 1947, one of Heruti's bombs destroyed a Palestine Police Force (PPF) outpost at the Sarona Compound, killing four police officers. In 1947 Nathan Yellin-Mor directed him to set up a Lehi cell in the UK. Heruti enrolled at London University law school as a cover and recruited a dozen accomplices from the ranks of right-wing Zionist groups like Betar and the Hebrew Legion. Lehi's leadership instructed Heruti to kill British Foreign Secretary Ernest Bevin, who'd broken the Labour Party's promise to rescind the White Paper and establish a Jewish state immediately after the war, General Evelyn Barker, the former general officer commanding of the Palestine Command, and Roy Farran, a former PPF policeman who had been tried but acquitted for his role in the alleged murder of a teenage Lehi member. The order to kill Bevin was later rescinded. A letter bomb was sent to Barker's home, but his wife saw it as suspicious and called the police. The bomb sent to Farran's home was opened by his younger brother Rex, who was killed. Heruti left the UK in May 1948, and took a ship from France to Israel. He fought in the 1948 Arab-Israeli War, in the Jerusalem area.

== Kingdom of Israel ==
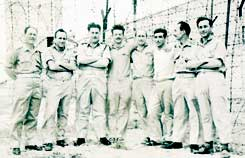
Kingdom of Israel members pose with prison guards following their release in 1955. Heruti is second from the left.

In the 1950s, Heruti led a small militant group composed primarily of former Lehi members called Kingdom of Israel, also known as the Tzrifin Underground. In February 1953, Kingdom of Israel bombed the Soviet Embassy to protest Soviet antisemitism, injuring three people including the Soviet ambassador's wife and severely damaging the building. The Soviet Union cut off diplomatic relations with Israel in response. The group also targeted the Czechoslovak Embassy and attempted to assassinate German Chancellor Konrad Adenauer, and occasionally shot at Jordanian troops in Jerusalem. Heruti and the other members of the group were apprehended in May 1953, and he was sentenced to 10 years in prison by a special military court. However, he and the other Kingdom of Israel members who were convicted had their sentences commuted two years later.

Following the murder of Rezső Kasztner in 1957, Heruti and several others were arrested on suspicion of membership in a terrorist organization. Heruti was acquitted of this charge, but was convicted of distributing leaflets condemning the judge for acquitting Kastzner. In January 1958, Heruti was sentenced to a year and a half in prison. Due to time served, he was released immediately.

== Later activities ==
Heruti was one of the founders of the right-wing political parties Tehiya and Tsomet. He coined the name of Rehavam Ze'evi's party Moledet. As a lawyer he helped settler activists purchase land in the occupied territories, and he remained close to the leadership of Gush Emunim. In the 1990s and 2000s he was active at the Ariel University Center of Samaria. He supported the expulsion of Arabs from Israel and the eventual establishment of an Israeli empire "from the Euphrates to the Nile." Heruti was not religiously observant; his political views were defined by the work of Stern, Greenberg, and Israel Eldad.

Heruti had been married twice. He has one son from his first wife and six children from his second wife. He lived in Tel Aviv.
