= Fred Stewart (Alberta politician) =

Canadian politician (1934–2023)

The Honourable Fred Stewart

MLA for Calgary North Hill
- In office 1986–1993
- Preceded by: Ed Oman
- Succeeded by: Richard Magnus

Personal details
- Born: Frederick Alan Stewart; July 8, 1934 Maple Creek, Saskatchewan, Canada
- Died: August 11, 2023 (aged 89) Calgary, Alberta, Canada
- Party: Progressive Conservative Association of Alberta
- Education: University of Saskatchewan, University of Toronto Law School

Frederick Alan Stewart (July 8, 1934 – August 11, 2023) was a Canadian politician from Alberta.

== Political career ==
Stewart was first elected to the Legislative Assembly of Alberta in the electoral district of Calgary North Hill in the 1986 general election. He defeated Noel Jantzie of the NDP and two other candidates to hold the district for the Progressive Conservatives. He was re-elected in the 1989 general election over Pauline Kay of the Liberals and two other candidates. He retired at the end of his second term in office.

== Personal life and death ==
Stewart had two sons. He died in Calgary on August 11, 2023, having had dementia in his later years. He was 89.
