= Roy Farran =

British soldier and Canadian politician (1921–2006)

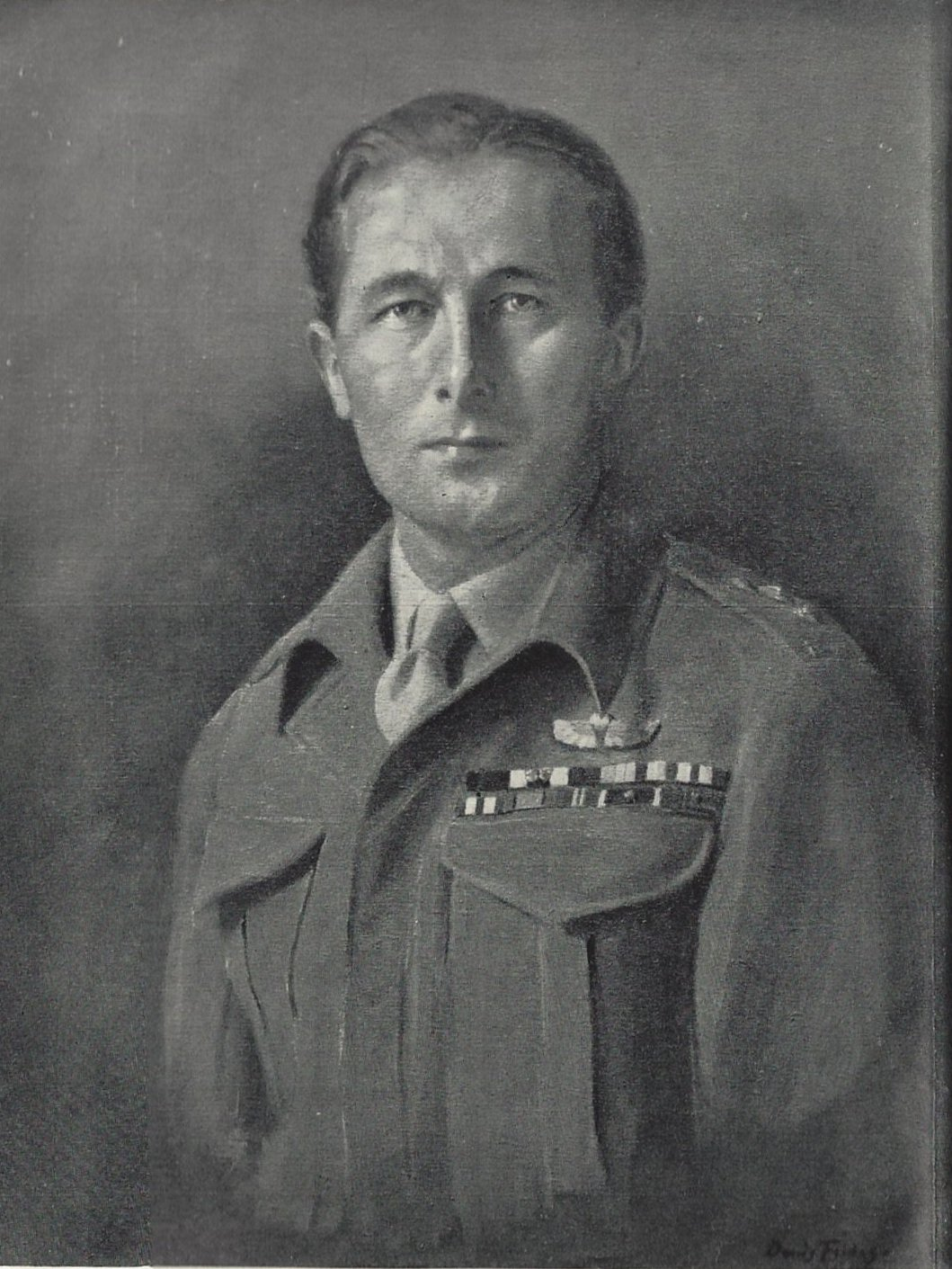
- Major Roy Farran by Denis Fildes

Member of the Legislative Assembly of Alberta
- In office 30 August 1971 – 13 March 1979
- Preceded by: New district
- Succeeded by: Ed Oman
- Constituency: Calgary-North Hill

Minister of Telephones and Utilities of Alberta
- In office 6 March 1973 – 2 April 1975
- Preceded by: Len Werry
- Succeeded by: Allan Warrack

Solicitor General of Alberta
- In office 3 April 1975 – 22 March 1979
- Preceded by: Helen Hunley
- Succeeded by: Graham Harle

City of Calgary Alderman
- In office 23 October 1961 – 19 October 1963
- In office 19 October 1964 – 25 October 1971

Personal details
- Born: 2 January 1921 Simla, Punjab Province, British India
- Died: 1 June 2006 (aged 85) Calgary, Alberta, Canada
- Party: Progressive Conservative
- Spouse: Ruth Farran
- Occupation: Soldier, author, politician, publisher

Military service
- Allegiance: United Kingdom
- Branch/service: British Army
- Rank: Major
- Unit: 3rd Carabiniers (Prince of Wales's Dragoon Guards) 3rd The King's Own Hussars
- Commands: 3 Squadron, 2 SAS
- Battles/wars: Second World War; North African campaign; Battle of Sidi Barrani; Battle of Crete; Italian campaign; Operation Husky; Operation Slapstick; Operation Devon; Operation Tombola; Operation Overlord; Operations Wallace and Hardy; Palestine Emergency
- Awards: Distinguished Service Order; Military Cross & Two Bars; Legion of Honour (France); Croix de Guerre (France); Legion of Merit (USA)

Major Roy Alexander Farran DSO, MC & Two Bars (2 January 1921 – 2 June 2006), also known as Paddy McGinty, was a British-Canadian soldier, politician, farmer, author and journalist. He was highly decorated for his exploits with the Special Air Service (SAS) during the Second World War. Farran became widely known after his court-martial on a charge of beating an unarmed 17-year-old member of the Jewish underground militant group Lehi to death during his command of an undercover Palestine Police special squad. After his brother was killed in a revenge attack, Farran emigrated to Canada where he forged a successful business and political career, holding a seat in the Legislative Assembly of Alberta from 1971 to 1979 sitting with the Progressive Conservative caucus. He served as a cabinet minister in the government of Premier Peter Lougheed during that period.

== Early life ==
Farran was born on 2 January 1921, either in Purley, Surrey, or in Shimla, India, to a family of Irish Roman Catholics (the Ó Faracháin were from County Donegal). His father was a Warrant Officer in the Royal Air Force. He spent most of his early life in India and was educated at the Bishop Cotton School in Shimla before returning to Britain in the mid-1930s, where he enlisted in the Inns of Court Regiment and attended the Royal Military College, Sandhurst. After graduating from Sandhurst, Farran was commissioned as a second lieutenant into the 3rd Carabiniers (Prince of Wales's Dragoon Guards) and sent to the 51st Training Regiment.

== Military career ==
=== Second World War ===
==== North Africa and Crete ====
Farran was posted on attachment to the 3rd The King's Own Hussars, which was serving in the North African Campaign at the time, and joined the regiment just in time for the beginning of Operation Compass. This was a British offensive against Italian forces in North Africa, which began in December 1940, and participated in the Battle of Sidi Barrani. In the aftermath of one battle, he was detailed to supervise a burial party and came across a damaged Italian tank, its entire crew dead; unable to recover the bodies, Farran set the tank's petrol tank on fire. After Operation Compass came to an end, the Hussars were transferred to the island of Crete, to reinforce the British and Commonwealth forces that were stationed there after their retreat from Greece. Farran was attached to the regiment's 'C' Squadron, which was located several miles west of Canea when the Germans began their invasion of Crete on 20 May 1941. Farran was ordered to take a troop of tanks and block a road that led from the village of Galatas, and shortly afterwards sighted and killed a number of German troops escorting a group of 40 captured hospital patients. The troop came under attack from Stukas and well-hidden ground forces. Returning from this mission, Farran's troop encountered five Germans who attempted to surrender; he ordered them shot. Three of the Germans were killed, while the other two managed to escape. Farran later wrote that the incident occurred in the heat of the moment. On 21 May, the 10th Infantry Brigade launched a successful assault on Cemetery Hill, in which Farran participated. German forces were eventually able to break through the British and Commonwealth positions around Galatas, and Farran was part of a counter-attack in an attempt to retake the village. He protested about the unsuitability of his light tanks for the task but was told that no heavy tanks were left. Farran later wrote of his guilt at allowing the dangerous lead position to be taken by a subordinate -"I did not care for orders when it suited me, but this time I had chosen to obey them because I knew that I would be killed if I did not. I should have been in that leading tank. Instead, there was Skedgewell dead and his pretty young wife waiting at home. I felt as if I had murdered him." During the action he was wounded in the right arm and both of his legs, and as a result he was captured by German forces. It was at this time that he was awarded the Military Cross, for gallantry during his service in Crete.

==== Escape and return to duty ====
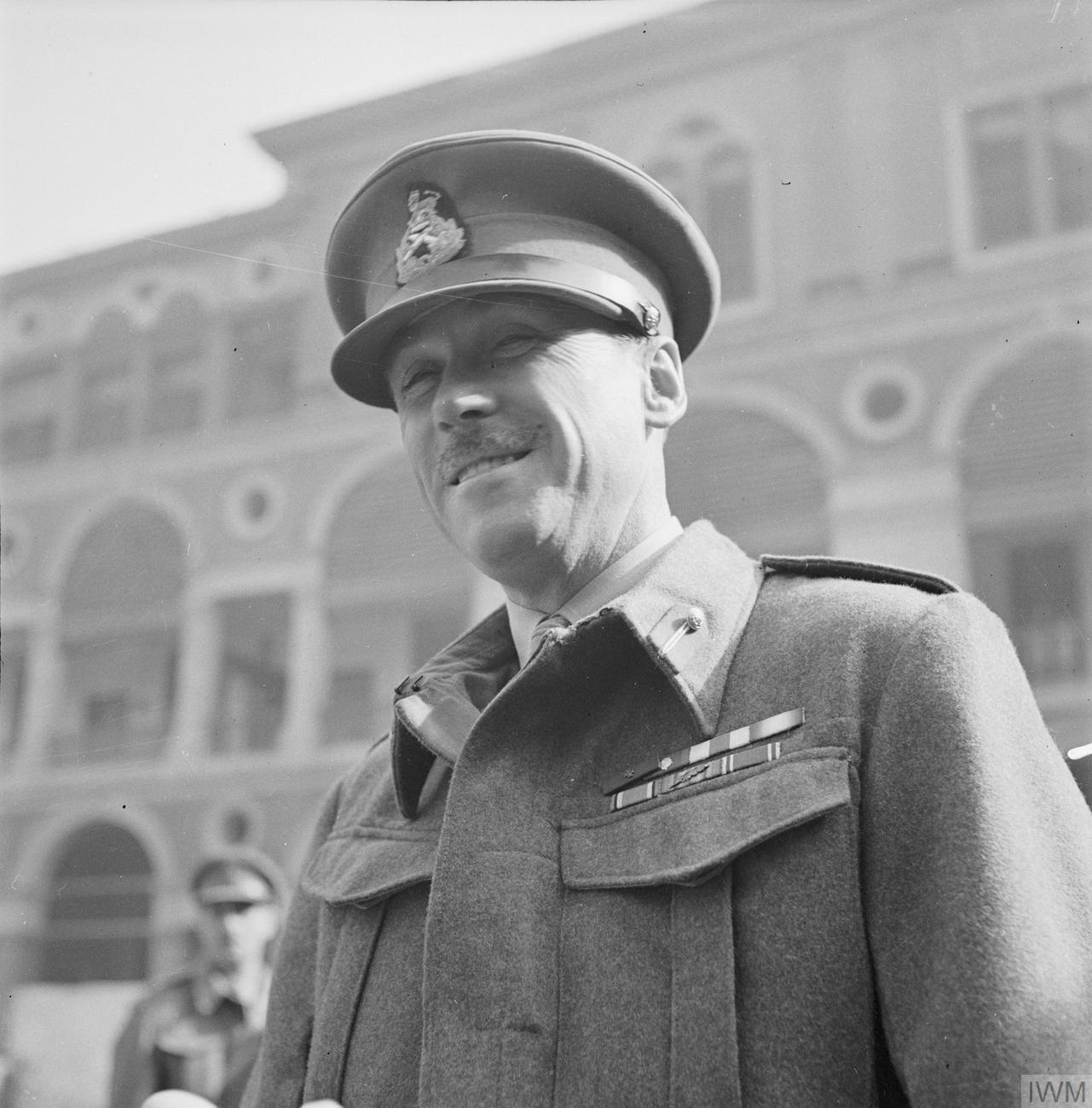
Major-General John Charles "Jock" Campbell on being presented with the Victoria Cross by Commander-in-Chief General Sir Claude Auchinleck. Campbell was the newly promoted commander of the 7th Armoured Division, and was killed in the staff car driven by Roy Farran.

After being captured, Farran was flown to a hospital for prisoners of war in Athens for treatment, and by August he was able to walk with the aid of crutches. He made several unsuccessful attempts to escape, and finally succeeded when a sentry became distracted; Farran was able to crawl under the wire and make his way unseen to a nearby ditch. Moved between a series of houses, he was eventually able to link up with a number of friendly Greek civilians and three other escaped Australian and British prisoners, and was lent money to hire a caïque to sail from the port of Piraeus to British-held Egypt. The group hoped to make it in four days, but a storm pushed the boat off course. The boat ran out of fuel after two days, and Farran created an ad hoc sail from blankets; their water supplies ran out shortly after, and Farran was forced to knock out one man who became agitated as a result. Fortunately one of the prisoners, a Sergeant Wright, was able to make a crude water distiller that produced enough drinkable water for the party to survive. After 10 days adrift, the boat was spotted by a Royal Navy destroyer 40 miles (64 km) off the coast of Alexandria. Farran was awarded a Bar to his Military Cross as a result of leading the Greeks and prisoners to freedom.

In January 1942, Farran was appointed as the Aide-de-camp for Major General John "Jock" Campbell, the newly promoted commander of the 7th Armoured Division and recipient of the Victoria Cross (for actions in November 1941).

On 26 February 1942, he was driving Campbell in his staff car during an inspection of the forward fighting area around Gazala when he lost control of the car on a road of freshly laid clay. The car overturned, throwing Farran out but killing Campbell in the process and knocking the other occupants unconscious; he later admitted that while he awaited rescue, he had contemplated suicide. When a new divisional commander was appointed, Farran remained with the divisional staff.

==== Sicily and Italy ====
When the British Eighth Army was forced to retreat towards El Alamein during the summer of 1942, Farran was wounded during a Luftwaffe attack on the division's headquarters. He was subsequently evacuated to Britain, but pulled a number of strings until he was able to convince a medical board in February 1943 to pass him as capable for combat; he was transferred to three separate units before joining a group of new recruits heading for the Middle East to join the 3rd Hussars. However, he met up with an old friend which led to him attempting to join the new 2nd Special Air Service being formed near Algiers. After an interview with the regiment's commander, Lieutenant Colonel David Stirling, and a parachute training course, Farran became the second-in-command of a squadron. He commanded it during Operation Husky, the invasion of Sicily, and despite suffering from malaria led the squadron in an assault against a lighthouse at Cape Passero which was believed to hold a machine gun position. He also led a number of reconnaissance and sabotage patrols behind enemy lines.

During September 1943, a composite squadron from 2 SAS landed at the Italian port of Taranto with orders to conduct reconnaissance patrols and attack targets of opportunity ahead of the general Allied advance. During this deployment Farran commanded a section of jeeps from 'D' Squadron, which ambushed a number of German convoys and linked up with advancing Canadian forces. They also became involved in street-fighting on several occasions before moving to the city of Bari, where it was ordered to locate escaped Allied prisoners of war, managing to free 50. A report on the composite squadron's activities, including Farran's jeeps, concluded that their use had not been justified and that the SAS troops would have been better employed conducting sabotage operations. Michael Asher argues that the squadron's role would have been better suited to an armoured car unit.

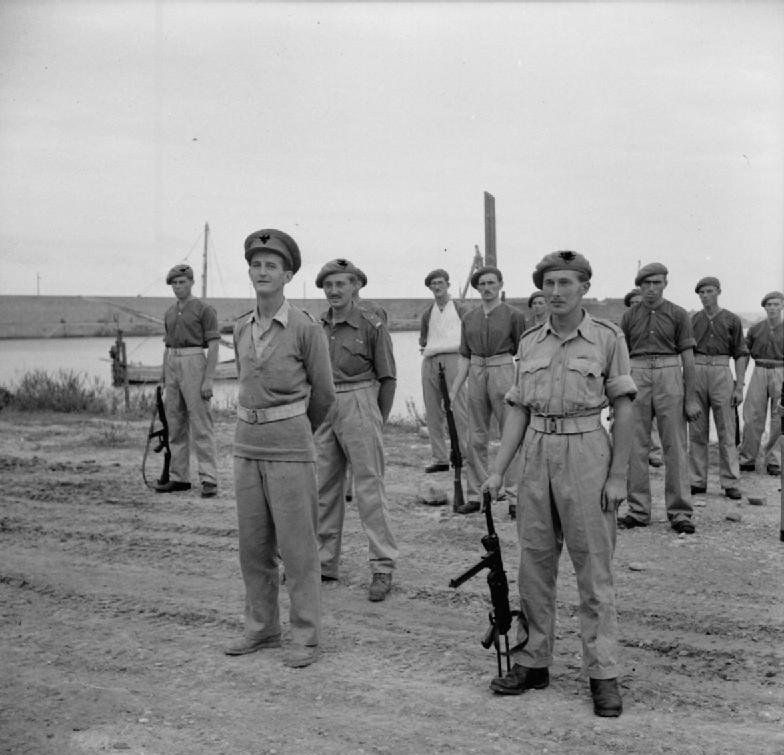
Captain Roy Farran (right) on parade with members of 2 SAS in the captured Italian port of Termoli

On 3 October, the Allies made a seaborne landing at the town of Termoli, with the aim of outflanking the Axis positions in the area and thereby aid the northwards advance of the Eighth Army and the United States Fifth Army. The 1st Special Service Brigade formed part of the amphibious landings, and attached to the Brigade were several Special Air Service units, including 1st Special Air Service Regiment, recently renamed 1st Special Raiding Squadron. Farran, with a detachment of 20 men from 'D' Squadron of 2 SAS, came ashore with the rest of 1 SRS with orders to create a base for future raids behind enemy lines. The seaborne landings soon became stalemated against fierce Axis resistance, and Farran and his men joined the rest of 1 SRS in an attempt to repel a German counterattack supported by armour. Positioned on a ridge with a light mortar and six Bren light machine guns, and later several 6 pounder anti-tank guns, Farran and his men were able to help repel the attack. The Axis forces launched several more assaults on the Allied positions, which Farran and his men also helped to repulse, before finally retreating from the area. During the closing days of October, Farran commanded four parties of troops from 2 SAS who were landed by motor torpedo boat near the city of Ancona, and were able to destroy 17 sections of the railway that linked Ancona and Pescara, as well as laying mines on the main road between the two towns. After being successfully extracted Farran and the rest of 2 SAS spent another four months in Italy, before returning to Britain in early 1944; around this time Farran received another Bar to his Military Cross for his successful actions around Pescara and Ancona.

==== France ====
Farran remained in Britain until August, by which time the Western Allies had invaded France and gained a foothold in Normandy. With the German forces opposing them worn down by months of airstrikes and mass artillery bombardments, unaided by the Luftwaffe, Allied commanders expected to be able to achieve a decisive breakout in Normandy. When this occurred, it was believed that a large number of German troops, particularly Panzer divisions, would retreat eastwards through the 'Orléans Gap' situated to the south of Paris; in order to trap these forces, it was planned to drop several British and American airborne divisions into the gap as a blocking force. Given the codename of Operation Transfigure, the divisions would be accompanied by units from 1 and 2 SAS, including three troops from 'C' Squadron, one of which would be commanded by Farran. His part in the operation would be to land by Airspeed Horsa glider with 20 jeeps near the Rambouillet forest, and then link up with SAS troops already operating in the area. Ultimately, Transfigure did not take place, as Allied ground forces advanced too quickly during the breakout for the airborne troops to be used effectively.

==== Operation Wallace ====
However, on 19 August, Farran landed with 60 men and 20 jeeps at Rennes airfield, which was now under Allied control, with orders to begin Operation Wallace. His jeeps were to advance some 200 miles (320 km) behind German lines and link up with 50 SAS troopers who had previously established a base camp near Châtillon, to the north of the city of Dijon. This was one of a number of bases set up by SAS patrols to attack retreating German troops and lines of communications. Under the command of Captain Grant-Hibbert, the troopers had spent the three weeks prior to Farran's arrival ambushing German convoys and blowing up a stretch of railway between Dijon and Langres.

The journey to Grant-Hibbert's position took Farran and his men four days; the first 50 miles were uneventful, as local French resistance fighters were able to help the SAS troopers avoid German positions. To increase the chances of not being discovered, Farran split the jeeps into three groups, and ordered them to maintain a distance of 30 minutes and avoid all German resistance; unfortunately the first group disobeyed the orders and drove through the village of Mailly-le-Chateau, occupied by a German garrison. Although the group made it through the village, losing a jeep in the process, Farran and the next group were ambushed and came under fire, forcing his group and the following one to divert south to the Foret de St Jean, rendezvousing with the first group. The same process took place on the following day, but once again the leading group encountered German troops and suffered heavy losses, only the commander surviving and escaping; they were unable to warn the other two groups, which were also attacked. Farran and his men were able to skirt the Germans, but the third group were all but destroyed, with only a few surviving. The survivors retreated back to Paris, and eventually joined Farran by parachute insertion at a later date.

Now left with only seven of his original jeeps, Farran pressed on, the remainder of the troopers strafing a passing goods train, puncturing the boiler on its engine and forcing it to come to a halt. Eventually they linked up with Grant-Hibbert's men after one final encounter during their journey, assaulting a German radar station and causing the German garrison to flee; prisoners informed the SAS troopers that they believed the jeeps to be the advance guard of General George S. Patton's United States Third Army. Farran took command of the combined group, which consisted of a composite squadron of 60 troopers, 10 jeeps and a civilian truck, and ordered it to move to another base to avoid further German scrutiny. The squadron roamed around until the end of August, assaulting German troop convoys and facilities, and then split into three groups to maximise the area they could cover and the damage that could be dealt to the German forces. Throughout their entire time behind German lines they were supplied by the Royal Air Force in 36 sorties, which supplied the SAS with 12 new jeeps and 36 supply panniers. Operation Wallace came to an end on 17 September, when the groups linked up with advance elements of the Seventh United States Army. During the month they had been active, Farran and his men had caused more than 500 German casualties, and destroyed some 95 enemy vehicles and more than 100,000 gallons of petrol. 17 SAS troopers had been lost, including one in a parachuting accident, as well as 16 jeeps. After linking up with the American forces, Farran sent the squadron back to Paris and granted it a week's leave in the capital, despite it officially being out of bounds to all British troops. As a result of these actions, Farran was awarded a Distinguished Service Order, which unusually was awarded under the pseudonym of 'Patrick McGinty'; Farran had used the name since his escape from German captivity in 1941, and claimed that the name was a reference to an Irish song.

==== Greece ====
After his return, Farran took a brief journey to Greece to locate the Greek civilians who had helped him escape from the prisoner of war camp in 1941; he was successful in doing so, and also witnessed the beginnings of the Greek Civil War as German forces retreated from the country.

==== Operation Tombola ====
In the middle of December, Farran was dispatched to Italy with 3 Squadron, 2 SAS. The squadron had only been recently formed and was composed of volunteers from the British 1st and 6th Airborne Divisions; Farran believed it to be well-trained and highly disciplined. The squadron came under the command of General Mark Clark's 15th Army Group, and between December 1944 and February 1945 conducted several small-scale operations in La Spezia and the Brenner Pass. These operations were small in scale, however, and Farran began to devise a plan for deploying a larger formation; it would be deployed behind German lines, but still be close enough to 15th Army Group to aid Allied ground forces in their own operations. He focused his planning on the three departments of what is now Emilia Romagna: Parma, Reggio Emilia, and Modena. Italian partisan brigades operated in each department, controlled by a headquarters or Comando Unico, and supported by an Allied liaison officer who supervised supply drops and encouraged them to fight the German forces in their area. The only department with a liaison officer ready to accept the arrival of SAS forces was Reggio Emilia, which suited Farran's plan well as the forward-most point of 15th Army Group was only 12 miles (19 km) from the department.

Farran wanted to command the operation, known as Tombola, himself, but was forbidden by staff officers at 15th Army Group's headquarters. He did, however, get permission to accompany the transport aircraft the SAS troopers used to parachute into the area. When the operation began on 4 March, Farran "accidentally" fell out of the aircraft from which he was watching the parachute drop, although he was fortunate enough to have a parachute on at the time and his personal kit with him. All of the troopers landed safely, although one officer dislocated his shoulder on landing and had to be left in the care of several Italian civilians. They were met by the SOE liaison officer, Michael Lees. Lees took Farran and his men to meet the commander of the local Comando Unico, which was formed of four brigades – three Communist and one Christian Democrat. When they arrived, Farran proposed to the Unico that a new battalion known as the Battaglione Alleato be created, with its core an SAS company; it would be fleshed out by a company of right-wing partisans and another of Russian deserters from the Wehrmacht. Although this was agreed to, Farran was not enamoured with the state of the partisans when he first inspected them, stating that "nearly all of them had some physical defect." To improve their fitness and training, Farran arranged for several instructors and an Italian interpreter to be parachuted in, as well as a large quantity of supplies. Within a few days the SAS company, with a strength of 40 men, had arrived to form the core of the battalion, with one officer and four men attached to each of the other companies in a supervisory capacity.

===== Villa Rossi and Villa Calvi =====
The battalion's first target, as proposed by both Farran and Lees, was the headquarters of the German 51 Mountain Corps (LI Gebirgs Korps) of General Valentin Feurstein and then led from General Friedrich-Wilhelm Hauck, stationed in the area of Albinea, 20 miles from where they landed. Army Group Headquarters initially agreed with the proposal and supplied aerial photography of the headquarters. At the same time, it was discovered that local German forces were beginning an anti-partisan drive into the mountains where the battalion was stationed. Despite this however, Farran decided to continue with the attack, and was en route to the headquarters with the battalion when he was contacted by Army Group Headquarters, who withdrew permission for the attack to take place. Farran ignored the injunction and continued towards the target, on the grounds that he might lose all credibility with the partisans if their first operation was cancelled. Farran had conducted a personal reconnaissance of the headquarters on 23 March, and the battalion arrived in three columns at a farm about 10 miles (16 km) from the target on 26 March. There they rested until nightfall. At 02:00 on 27 March the battalion began the attack on the headquarters.

The headquarters consisted of a number of buildings centered around two villas: Villa Rossi, occupied by the Corps commander himself, and Villa Calvi, occupied by his chief of staff. The entire garrison consisted of around 300 German soldiers. The assault itself would see the British SAS company and a number of Italians force their way into the two villas, while the Russian company would place themselves between the villas and the other buildings, preventing the rest of the garrison from intervening. The partisans were able to approach the villas without being spotted, quietly eliminating several sentries in the process. However, their plan to use their bazooka to gain entry to the villa was trashed when it misfired. They were able to reach the interior of the villa by force, but fierce German resistance meant they were unable to move upstairs and kill the chief of staff; they therefore used explosives, petrol, and looted furniture to set the villa on fire, ensuring that the remaining Germans stayed inside with bursts of machine gun fire. Although effective, this conflagration meant that the Germans in Villa Rossi were alerted to the attack before the group of partisans attacking the villa could begin their assault; as in the other villa, the occupants put up a stiff resistance and stymied attempts by the partisans to reach the top floor. A number of Germans were killed in the firefight, however, and one may have been the Corps commander. Under heavy fire, the partisans retreated after setting fire to the villa's kitchen.

The rest of the German garrison reacted swiftly to the attack, and soon brought the Russian screening force under machine-gun fire. On Farran's signal of a red Very light, the entire force retreated from the area, carrying those who had been wounded. After nearly a day marching through the mountains, obscured from German search parties by mist and rain, the battalion arrived in a partisan-controlled village. For their efforts, the battalion had three British soldiers killed, as well as eight British and Italians wounded; this included Lees, who suffered injuries that crippled him permanently – he was eventually taken by light aircraft to a hospital in Florence. Six Russians from the covering force were captured, and Thompson states that they were probably executed 'on the spot'. (it was later discovered that the six missing Russians were safe at the Resistance headquarters days later.) About 60 Germans had been killed by the partisans, including the Chief of Staff. In the aftermath of the raid, the local German forces undertook a drive into the mountains with the goal of eliminating the partisans. Between 28 March and 12 April, aided by the SAS and using heavy weapons, which included a 75-mm pack howitzer and 3-inch mortars, the partisans openly fought the Germans. The battalion was attacked three times in its previously prepared positions, each time repelling the attacks and inflicting heavy German casualties; after one attack on 10 April, the partisans counted 51 German bodies. After heavy fighting and suffering several local reverses, the Russian company conducted a counter-attack that forced the Germans to retreat and end the drive.

===== Aftermath =====
At the beginning of April, Farran was informed that the United States Fifth Army was planning to launch an offensive in the area in which he and the partisans were operating. As the army's axis of advance would lead through Modena, Farran decided, with the approval of Army Group Headquarters, to move the battalion into Modena and support the local partisans operating there. Equipped with jeeps, the battalion would launch attacks on Route 12, the primary Florence-Modena route, with the intention of harassing German troops using it. On 5 April Farran received word that the offensive was beginning, and led the battalion to its new area of operations. When it arrived, it was discovered that the terrain lacked any cover for the partisans; as the road ran along an open valley, this would force the jeeps to drive right up to the convoys before opening fire. Farran therefore decided to target German troops on and around the road with the 75-mm howitzer, and then send in the jeeps after they had been bombarded. An initial attack on the village of Sassuolo, near Modena, was extremely successful, and the partisans launched a number of similar raids against Route 12.

After a series of raids, on 20 April, Farran was informed that Fifth Army had broken through German lines, and he decided to have the battalion assault the city of Reggio Emilia, which straddled Route 12. The howitzer was used to bombard the main square of the town, and Farran later discovered that the local German and Italian Fascist garrison believed the attack to be coming from the vanguard of an American armoured division. As a result, the town was abandoned two hours after the shelling had begun. Then on 22 April, it was discovered that American troops had penetrated near the city of Bologna, causing German forces to retreat down Route 12. Positioning the partisan battalion near the Sassuolo Bridge, Farran used the howitzer, mortars, and a machine gun to open fire on the traffic using the bridge, destroying a number of vehicles. The attack attracted the attention of a flight of Supermarine Spitfires, who strafed the area and inflicted more casualties. After fighting all day, Farran withdrew the battalion from the area, and after harassing more German transport columns for a further day, moved the battalion into Modena to help mop up any remaining resistance. Very soon afterwards, orders came for the operation to cease and the British troops to travel to Florence. During its time operating, the battalion had killed an estimated 300 German soldiers and destroyed twenty vehicles, as well as taking 158 prisoners of war, and had suffered 24 casualties in return.

When he returned to Florence and reported to Army Group Headquarters, Farran was told why the Headquarters had wanted to delay the raid on the Corps Headquarters; a major attack by 15th Army Group against that Corps had been scheduled to take place 10 days after the raid, and it was feared that Farran's assault on the headquarters would alert the Germans to the attack. The attack had been cancelled, and as a result of this Farran believed that he would be court-martialled for disobeying orders. This did not occur, however, and he was in fact awarded the American Legion of Merit for his actions during Tombola.

=== Post-war service ===
When the Second World War in Europe came to an end, Farran accompanied 2 SAS to Norway, where the unit aided in the process of disarming the German troops stationed there. He was awarded the Croix de Guerre in 1946, and then returned to the 3rd Hussars where he became the regiment's second-in-command. He served with the regiment in Syria for a time, as well as British Mandate Palestine. During his initial period in Palestine, he was with several fellow officers when a nearby ammunition dump was destroyed by guerrillas; Farran and his comrades pursued the guerrillas, managing to wound two of them. Shortly after this, Farran transferred back to Britain to serve as an instructor at Sandhurst, but then volunteered to be seconded to the Palestine Police Force, which maintained order in the Mandate.

== Palestine ==
When Farran arrived in Palestine, the British authorities were in the midst of attempting to suppress Jewish paramilitary organizations operating in the Mandate. The largest and most effective of these groups was known as the Irgun, which controlled between 5,000 and 6,000 paramilitary members proficient in sabotage and street fighting, as well as an intelligence section staffed by a number of ex-Special Operations Executive and Secret Intelligence Service operatives that the British Joint Intelligence Committee labelled "excellent". Although the Irgun and other Jewish paramilitary groups were outnumbered by a ratio of 20:1 by British security forces,

British attempts to end their activities were hampered by an inadequate intelligence organization which was understaffed and over-stretched, with many of its small number of personnel consisting of "enterprising amateurs" seconded from other units. Political violence by Jewish paramilitary groups began when the war came to an end, and by early 1947 Palestine had experienced a large number of attacks against British targets. Debates raged in London over what the best course of action was to combat the attacks. On 2 March 1947, martial law was declared throughout Tel Aviv and the Jewish sector of Jerusalem, with the intended aim of differentiating the paramilitary members from the civilian population and ending the attacks. However, this had the opposite effect, and the number of attacks actually doubled.

=== "A free hand for us against terror" ===
After two high-profile kidnappings, the Cabinet acceded to Field Marshal Bernard Montgomery's request for the restrictions on force employed in security operations to be lifted, despite opposition from the Colonial Office and the fact that the Cabinet had signalled an intention to withdraw from Palestine. Former Royal Marine Nicol Gray, the Inspector General of the Palestine Police, impressed by the wartime exploits of special forces units behind the lines, authorized Brigadier Bernard Fergusson (who had served in the Chindits with Orde Wingate, the leader of the Special Night Squads) to create covert teams along similar lines.

Those in the police who heard of the new unit were aghast, and even Gray's tough-minded predecessor, Brigadier John Rymer-Jones, was moved to warn that the tactic would end in catastrophe. Fergusson ignored him and recruited two former 2nd SAS men as commanders: Alastair MacGregor (then with MI6) and Roy Farran. Some authors have seen Farran as an odd choice for the assignment given his propensity to contravene direct orders, lack of experience in security or police work, and (by his own later account) drinking problem.

MacGregor was to operate in north Palestine and Farran the south, while Fergusson took the Jerusalem squad pending the arrival of a third squad commander; these areas conformed to military zones, not the six Palestine Police districts. Subsequently, Fergusson said the concept was to provoke contact and give insurgents a "bloody nose", while Sir Henry Gurney insisted that the squads had never been authorized to use anything outside normal police methods. Farran, or so he later claimed, thought he had been given "carte blanche... a free hand". There was only a short period of training and it largely consisted of intensive pistol and close quarters battle practice. Utilizing jeeps, a citrus-fruit delivery truck and a dry-cleaner's lorry, Farran's team "moved among Jewish civilians in Jewish clothing" and made several arrests in the month they were active, although alert insurgents recognized them as British forces more than once. Farran did not have any fluent Hebrew speakers, but didn't liaise with the Criminal Investigation Department out of security concerns, and his unit (2001) lacked accurate intelligence on insurgents.

=== Alexander Rubowitz affair ===
On 6 May 1947, 17-year-old Alexander Rubowitz disappeared while putting up posters for Jewish paramilitary group Lehi. Palestine police CID believed he had been caught and killed by Farran's squad; Gurney ordered them "to proceed with the case as an ordinary criminal offence with the object of bringing Farran and any other accused to trial."

According to an account ruled inadmissible at Farran's trial, Rubowitz was taken to a remote location where, after being tortured to extract information, he was beaten to death by Farran with a rock and the body given to an Arab for disposal. His body was never found. Suspicions of Farran's involvement were first raised after a grey trilby hat, bearing the name Farran or Farkan, was found near the street corner where a struggling Rubowitz was seen being pushed into a car. Farran claimed he was being framed and fled to Syria. The Syrians, who were sympathetic to Farran, offered him political asylum, hoping he would train their troops for special operations against the Zionists. The case was discussed by the Syrian government. However, Colonel Bernard Fergusson persuaded Farran to return voluntarily. However, when, contrary to Fergusson's assurances, he was arrested, Farran escaped to Jordan, finally returning when he heard of reprisals being planned against British officers. He was brought to trial in a British military court in Jerusalem.

Farran was court martialled on a charge of murdering Alexander Rubowitz. Colonel Fergusson, to whom Farran was said to have confessed his guilt, refused to testify, on the grounds that he might incriminate himself.

Notes made by Farran while in custody and found after his escape reportedly contained a confession but were judged to be preparation for his defence and thus inadmissible under the rules of lawyer-client privilege. The prosecution failed to prove the hat was Farran's or even that Rubowitz was actually dead. The result was that the case collapsed for lack of evidence. On 2 October 1947, Farran was acquitted. Rubowitz's family made many unsuccessful attempts to revive the case. Alexander Rubowitz's body has never been found. After the trial, Fergusson was told to resign and leave the country within 36 hours.

=== Lehi bombing of family home ===
After his return from Palestine, the Lehi attempted to kill Farran by posting a parcel bomb to his family home in Codsall, Staffordshire. The package arrived almost one year to the day after Alexander Rubowitz had disappeared, but Roy Farran was away and the explosion killed Francis Rex Farran, his younger brother. The bomb was sent by a Lehi cell in Britain led by Yaakov Heruti, who had personally assembled it. In an episode of the BBC2 television documentary series Empire Warriors first broadcast on 19 November 2004, Knesset member and former Lehi operative Geulah Cohen claimed that the letter had been addressed to "R. Farran", without knowledge of the younger brother. The documentary was shortlisted for an international film award.

Two of those involved in the murder, Irgun members Monty Harris and Nathan Raymond Burns, were arrested in England in 1948. In October 1948, Harris was found guilty of illegally possessing explosives and sentenced to 7 years in prison, while Burns was acquitted. In August 1950, Harris was released from prison on condition of departing to Israel and renouncing his British citizenship.

== Post army life ==
1950 United Kingdom general election results
Dudley		Turnout 86.83%	
Affiliation	Candidate	Votes	%
Labour	George Wigg	32,856	54.62%
Conservative	Roy Farran	19,825	32.96%
Liberal	B.S. White	7,470	12.42%
Total		60,151	100%

After being discharged from the army, Farran moved to Scotland and briefly worked as a quarryman. Bill Stirling, the former commander of 2SAS, had given him refuge on his estate in Scotland and arranged the job for his former comrade. He briefly went to Africa, initially to Kenya and then to Southern Rhodesia to manage a construction company. While there, he met his future wife, Ruth Ardern from Canada. Her family owned a ranch in Alberta. After returning to the United Kingdom he ran in the 1950 United Kingdom general election in the constituency of Dudley where he ran as the candidate for the Conservative Party. He lost to incumbent Labour Member of Parliament George Wigg, finishing second out of the three candidates. After the election Farran emigrated to Canada in 1950 and settled in Calgary, Alberta, along with his wife. He began working for the Calgary Herald and later became owner and publisher of his own newspaper, the North Hill News. He also wrote the novel Jungle Chase as well as History of the Calgary Highlanders 1921–1954.

== Political career ==
1963 Alberta general election results
Calgary Queens Park		Turnout 54.64%	
Affiliation	Candidate	Votes	%
Social Credit	Lee Leavitt	4,363	48.20%
Progressive Conservative	Duncan McKilliop	1,597	17.64%
Independent	Roy Farran	1,496	16.53%
Liberal	John Donnachie	961	10.61%
NDP	Ben Greenfield	509	5.62%
Independent Social Credit	Conrad Pfeifer	126	1.40%
Total		9,052	100%

Farran launched his political career in Canada in 1961, running for a seat on the Calgary City Council. His campaign was coordinated by a young RCAF officer, Lynn Garrison, and would serve his first stint on Council until October 1963.

In June 1963, while he was still serving on Calgary City Council, Farran ran for a seat to the Alberta Legislature in the 1963 Alberta general election. He ran as an Independent candidate in the provincial electoral district of Calgary Queen's Park and finished in third place out of six candidates, losing to Social Credit incumbent Member of the Legislative Assembly (MLA) Lee Leavitt. Farran took over 16% of the popular vote and finished close behind second place Progressive Conservative candidate, Duncan McKilliop.

Farran returned for his second stint on Calgary City Council in 1964 and served until 1971 when he was elected to provincial office. He held his civic seat at the same time he held his provincial seat until his term expired in October that year.

1971 Alberta general election results
Calgary-North Hill		Turnout 71.06%	
Affiliation	Candidate	Votes	%
Progressive Conservative	Roy Farran	4,961	43.81%
Social Credit	Robert Simpson	4,900	43.28%
NDP	Barry Pashak	1,341	11.84%
Independent	Carl Reich	121	1.07%
Total		11,323	100%

Farran ran for a seat to the Legislative Assembly of Alberta in the 1971 Alberta general election. He won the new electoral district of Calgary-North Hill, defeating Social Credit incumbent Robert Simpson and future MLA Barry Pashak, as well as an Independent candidate in a hotly contested race to pick up the district for the Progressive Conservatives. The electoral district was one of the most hotly contested races in 1971, with just a spread of 0.53% separating Farran and Simpson.

The Progressive Conservatives would form their first government in the province. Premier Peter Lougheed appointed Farran to the Executive Council of Alberta in 1973 after the death of Len Werry and served as Minister of Telephones and Utilities. He would run for re-election in the 1975 Alberta general election with ministerial advantage. Farran faced Simpson for the second time, and a further three candidates. He was returned to office with a landslide plurality, picking up just over 70% of the popular vote. Simpson would see his popular support collapse, while the other three candidates had no significant impact in the race.

1975 Alberta general election results
Calgary-North Hill		Turnout 61.65%	
Affiliation	Candidate	Votes	%
Progressive Conservative	Roy Farran	6,673	70.96%
Social Credit	Robert Simpson	1,364	14.50%
NDP	Joan Ryan	723	7.69%
Liberal	Dorothy Groves	584	6.21%
Communist	Stephen Whitefield	60	0.64%
Total		9,404	100%

After the election Lougheed would shuffle his cabinet, and Farran was appointed as the Solicitor General. He held that position until he retired from provincial politics at the dissolution of the legislature in 1979. During his time in office he served on numerous committees in the Legislature, including Public Accounts; Private Bills; Standing Orders and Printing; Law; Law Amendments and Regulations; Public Affairs; Agriculture; and Education.

== Late life ==
After leaving provincial politics, he was appointed by the province of Alberta to serve as head of the Racing Commission. He also became a visiting professor at the University of Alberta and later founded a non-profit organization called French Vosges, providing Franco-Canadian student exchanges. He was awarded the Légion d'honneur in 1994 for his work in founding the organization. Farran battled against a throat cancer which resulted in having his larynx surgically removed. Farran died in 2006.

== Bibliography ==
- Aldrich, Richard J. (2001). The Hidden Hand: Britain, America, and Cold War secret intelligence. Woodstock. ISBN 978-0-7156-3607-7.
- Asher, Michael (2008). The Regiment: The Real Story of the SAS. Penguin. ISBN 978-0-14-102652-7.
- Harclerode, Peter (2005). Wings Of War – Airborne Warfare 1918–1945. Weidenfeld & Nicolson. ISBN 0-304-36730-3.
- Huston, James A. (1998). Out of the Blue – U.S Army Airborne Operations in World War II. Purdue University Press. ISBN 1-55753-148-X.
- Jones, Tim (2005). SAS: The first secret wars: The unknown years of combat & counter-insurgency. I.B. Tauris. ISBN 1-86064-676-X.
- Otway, Lieutenant-Colonel T.B.H. (1990). The Second World War 1939–1945 Army – Airborne Forces. Imperial War Museum. ISBN 0-901627-57-7.
- Thompson, Major General Julian (1999). The Imperial War Museum: War Behind Enemy Lines. Pan Grand. ISBN 0-330-36761-7.
- West, Nigel (1988). The Friends: Britain's Post-War Secret Intelligence Operations. Weidenfeld and Nicolson.
- Macintyre, Ben (2016). SAS: rogue heroes : the authorized wartime story. London: Viking. ISBN 978-0-241-18663-3.
