= Mike Lees =

British soldier and member of the Special Operations Executive during World War II

Captain Michael Lees
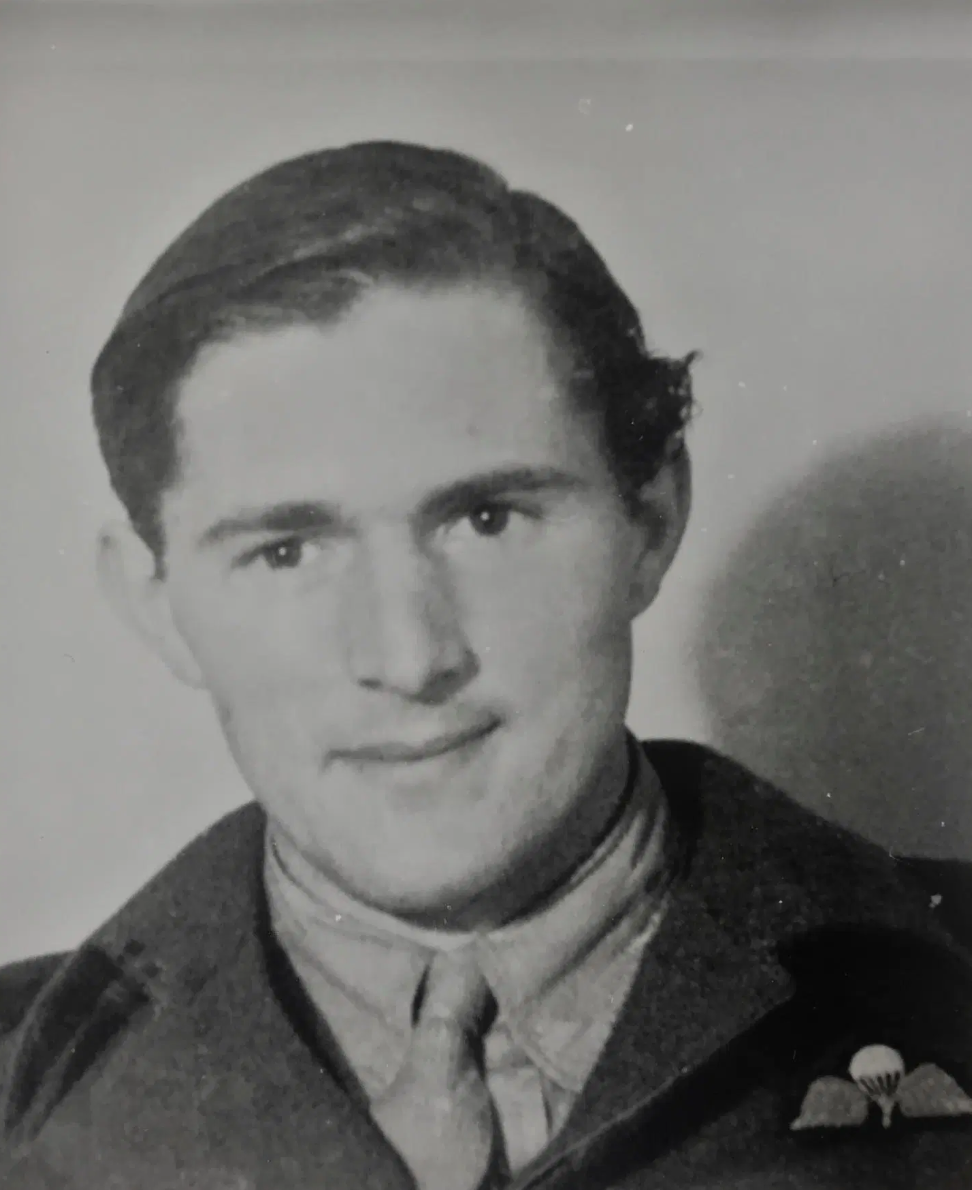
- Lees in 1943

Personal details
- Born: 17 May 1922 South Lytchett Manor, Dorset, England
- Died: 23 March 1993 (aged 70)
- Spouse: Gwendoline Lees
- Occupation: Soldier

Military service
- Allegiance: United Kingdom
- Branch/service: British Army
- Rank: Captain
- Unit: Queen's Own Dorset Yeomanry
- Battles/wars: World War II

Michael Lees (17 May 1922 – 23 March 1993) was a British soldier and member of the Special Operations Executive during World War II, who operated behind enemy lines supporting Italian and Yugoslavian partisan forces. The chief planner of Operation Tombola, an attack on the headquarters of the Wehrmacht's 14th Army near Reggio Emilia, made prematurely in contravention of orders from his superiors.

Lees was the son of Bernard Percy Turnbull Lees, who served with distinction in World War I with the Queen's Own Dorset Yeomanry, winning a Military Cross; and grandson of Sir Elliott Lees, the first Baronet Lees, a Major in the Dorset Yeomanry who fought in the Boer War and was awarded the Distinguished Service Order.

Following in his father's and grandfather's footsteps and joining the Dorset Yeomanry, as war broke out he volunteered for airborne services and was posted to Egypt where, in 1943, he joined the Special Operations Executive (SOE). He was sent to join Serbian nationalist Chetniks fighting against Tito's Communist-led Yugoslav partisans.

In September 1944 he was sent to Italy and joined SOE agents fighting alongside Italian partisans in the Apennine mountains.

== Mission 'Envelope' and Operation Tombola ==
Lees became head of SOE Mission 'Envelope' in January 1945. Shortly after, his relationships with his superiors deteriorated, to the extent he was felt to be a liability. Lees was offered evacuation by his superior Major Charles Macintosh. Lees rejected the offer, and replied vulgarly to Macintosh on 10 March:

"“by not accepting your invitation to come out I gave you a moral victory, but I did not accept because I realise that the firm would have jumped at the opportunity of putting some British Liaison Officer type who would sit here doing fuckall and give them a peaceful job with FANYs (First Aid Nursing Yeomanry) on their knees”.

On 19 March Lees reported that two German defectors had given him the location of German 14th Army Headquarters (possibly actually LI Mountain Corps HQ), and had performed reconnaissance which confirmed their testimony. SOE returned Lees’ message asking him to submit a plan of attack, and not to launch the attack alone, as they hoped to coordinate the action with a broader offensive by the British 15th Army.

On 21 March Lees’ submitted a plan of attack, which would have been launched jointly with Italian Partisans and a contingent of Special Air Service (SAS) led by Major Roy Farran. 28 March was the planned date of the operation. SOE responded “wait one week after target date…your scheme will then be correctly timed for maximum effort”. This would have delayed the operation until April 5, immediately proceeding Operation Grapeshot, the Spring 1945 offensive that would end with the capitulation of Axis forces in Italy. SOE planned for the attack to cause maximum disruption to the German defence, and deprive their planners of the ability to reorganize German headquarters staff outside of battle.

Despite SOE confirming Lees and Farran had received their orders, the pair disobeyed and attacked the German HQ according to their original timeline. They completely destroyed one of the two villas comprising the HQ, badly burning the other and killing several senior enemy officers. Lees was badly wounded during the attack, and wrote in his report to Major Macintosh "I hope the show was as success…look after the show for me as I will be layed up for a long time, and tell Charles Macintosh to fuck himself.”

=== Aftermath of Operation Tombola ===
Owing to his injuries, Lees was eventually smuggled by small airplane from behind enemy lines to Florence and repatriated to England. While in hospital in Chester, Lees claimed he had been promised a promotion to Major within a week of entering Italy. The report of this claim was passed to Lieutenant-Colonel Richard Thornton Hewitt, commander of Allied Special Forces in Italy. Hewitt investigated the claim, and found it spurious, writing "“I must emphasise most strongly that he was never promised promotion by me or any officer serving under me, that in no circumstances would I recommend his promotion…” This was partially due to Hewitt learning the claim of promotion had come from Lees himself. “I learnt, after he had been dropped, that (Lees) himself had expressed the view that he should have been granted major’s rank”. Hewitt also noted that Lees had been shielded from disciplinary action, only due to the wounds he sustained in combat.

On 17 July 1945 Major Farran recommended Lees be immediately gazetted with the Military Cross for his actions during the raid (making no mention of the orders to delay the attack). The recommendation was rejected, owing to both Lees' insubordination, and the squandered opportunity to incorporate Operation Tombola into Operation Grapeshot. Lieutenant Colonel John Grosvenor Beevor wrote in his rejection of the award: “It is not disputed that the facts given are correct or that this officer, along with SAS detachment, showed gallantry and enterprise. But in the opinion of 15th Army Group the value of this operation depended on its timing and Captain Lees with the SAS carried it out prematurely and recklessly, in spite of the express orders from 15th Army Group transmitted by this HQ. But for the gallantry displayed and the fact that Captain Lees was wounded in action, it is probably that disciplinary action would have been considered.”

Though not disciplined or court-martialed, Lees was blocked from a post-war career with MI6.

== Published books ==
- The Rape of Serbia: The British Role in Tito's Grab for Power 1943-1944 (Harcourt, 1990)
