= Ed Oman =

Canadian politician

Edwin Oman

MLA for Calgary North Hill
- In office 1979–1986
- Preceded by: Roy Farran
- Succeeded by: Fred Stewart

Personal details
- Born: August 31, 1930 Clanwilliam, Manitoba
- Died: September 19, 2013 (aged 83) Calgary, Alberta
- Party: Progressive Conservative Association of Alberta

Edwin Albert "Ed" Oman (August 31, 1930 – September 19, 2013) was a provincial level politician from Alberta, Canada.

== Political career ==
Oman was elected as a Member of the Legislative Assembly of Alberta representing the Calgary North Hill electoral district in the 1979 Alberta general election. He won easily over second place challenger Dennis Shupe from the Social Credit party and three other candidates to hold the district for the Progressive Conservatives. He was re-elected to a second term in office in the 1982 Alberta general election winning a landslide. He defeated challenger Agnes Middleton from the NDP and two other candidates. Oman retired from provincial politics at the end of his second term in office.

Oman died of pancreatic cancer September 19, 2013 in Calgary.

Legislative Assembly of Alberta
Preceded by Roy Farran	MLA Calgary North Hill; 1979–1986	Succeeded by Fred Stewart
