= Calgary-North Hill =

Defunct provincial electoral district in Alberta, Canada

Coordinates: 51.10°N 114.07°W

Alberta electoral district
- 2004 boundaries

Defunct provincial electoral district
- Legislature: Legislative Assembly of Alberta
- District created: 1971
- District abolished: 2012
- First contested: 1971
- Last contested: 2008

Calgary-North Hill was a provincial electoral district in Calgary, Alberta, Canada, mandated to return a single member to the Legislative Assembly of Alberta using the first past the post method of voting from 1971 to 2012.

== History ==
The Calgary-North Hill electoral district was created in the 1971 boundary redistribution out of Calgary Bowness and a small sliver on the south end of Calgary Queens Park and Calgary North. The riding covered central portion of north Calgary.

Since 1971, the district returned Progressive Conservative candidates. Some elections saw some very competitive races with other party candidates coming close to winning.

=== Boundary history ===
19 Calgary-North Hill 2003 boundaries
Bordering districts
North	East	West	South
Calgary-McCall, Calgary-Nose Hill	Calgary-East	Calgary-Varsity	Calgary-East Calgary-Mountain View
riding map goes here		map in relation to other districts in Alberta goes here	
Legal description from the Statutes of Alberta 2003, Electoral Divisions Act.
Starting at the intersection of 19 Street NW with John Laurie Boulevard NW; then 1. southeast along John Laurie Boulevard NW to 14 Street NW; 2. northeasterly along 14 Street NW to North Haven Drive NW; 3. southeast and south along North Haven Drive NW to 48 Avenue NW; 4. east along 48 Avenue NW, McKnight Boulevard NW and McKnight Boulevard NE to Deerfoot Trail NE; 5. south along Deerfoot Trail NE to 32 Avenue NE; 6. east along 32 Avenue NE to Barlow Trail NE; 7. south along Barlow Trail NE to 16 Avenue NE; 8. west along 16 Avenue NE to 19 Street NE; 9. south along 19 Street NE to 8 Avenue NE; 10. west along 8 Avenue NE to Deerfoot Trail NE; 11. north along Deerfoot Trail NE to 16 Avenue NE; 12. west along 16 Avenue NE and 16 Avenue NW to 19 Street NW; 13. north along 19 Street NW to the starting point.
Note:

Members of the Legislative Assembly for Calgary-North Hill
Assembly	Years	Member	Party
See: Calgary Bowness 1959-1971, Calgary Queens Park 1963-1971 and Calgary North 1959-1971
17th	1971–1975	Roy Farran	Progressive Conservative
18th	1975–1979	Roy Farran	Progressive Conservative
19th	1979–1982	Ed Oman	Progressive Conservative
20th	1982–1986	Ed Oman	Progressive Conservative
21st	1986–1989	Fred Stewart	Progressive Conservative
22nd	1989–1993	Fred Stewart	Progressive Conservative
23rd	1993–1997	Richard Magnus	Progressive Conservative
24th	1997–2001	Richard Magnus	Progressive Conservative
25th	2001–2004	Richard Magnus	Progressive Conservative
26th	2004–2008	Richard Magnus	Progressive Conservative
27th	2008–2012	Kyle Fawcett	Progressive Conservative

=== Electoral history ===
The electoral district was created in the 1971 boundary re-distribution. The first election held in the district that year saw a hotly contested race with former Calgary Alderman Roy Farran running as a candidate for the Progressive Conservatives against incumbent Social Credit MLA Robert Simpson and future NDP MLA Barry Pashak. Farran won the race by 61 votes over Simpson to pick up the district for his party.

Premier Peter Lougheed appointed Farran to his cabinet in 1973. He ran for a second term in office in the 1975 general election with ministerial advantage against Simpson for the second time. This time Farran would defeat him in a landslide. Farran would remain in cabinet until he retired at dissolution in 1979.

The 1979 general election saw Progressive Conservative candidate Ed Oman hold the seat with a landslide. He was re-elected to a second term in 1982 winning the biggest popular vote of any candidate in the history of the district. Oman retired at dissolution in 1986.

Progressive Conservative candidate Fred Stewart became the third representative of the district winning election for the first time in the 1986 election. He was re-elected to a second term in the 1989 general election facing a strong challenge from both the Liberal and NDP candidates. He retired at from provincial politics at the end of his second term in 1993.

Richard Magnus became the fourth representative for the district in the 1993 general election. He faced a strong challenge from Liberal candidate Tom Dixon but still won a comfortable plurality to hold the district for his party. Magnus was re-elected three more times in 1997, 2001 and 2004 before retiring from office in the 2008 general election.

The last representative was Progressive Conservative MLA Kyle Fawcett who was elected for the first time in the 2008 general election in a hotly contested race over Liberal candidate Pat Murray.

== Legislative election results ==
=== 1971 ===
1971 Alberta general election
Party	Candidate	Votes	%	±%
Progressive Conservative	Roy Farran	4,961	43.81%	–
Social Credit	Robert A. Simpson	4,900	43.27%	–
New Democratic	Barry Pashak	1,341	11.84%	–
Independent	Carl L. Riech	121	1.07%	–
Total		11,323	–	–
Rejected, spoiled and declined		104	–	–
Eligible electors / turnout		16,080	71.06%	–
Progressive Conservative pickup new district.				
Source(s) Source: "Calgary-North Hill Official Results 1971 Alberta general election". Alberta Heritage Community Foundation.

=== 1975 ===
1975 Alberta general election
Party	Candidate	Votes	%	±%
Progressive Conservative	Roy Farran	6,673	62.94%	19.13%
Social Credit	Robert A. Simpson	2,562	24.17%	-19.11%
New Democratic	Joan Ryan	723	6.82%	-5.02%
Liberal	Dorothy Groves	584	5.51%	–
Communist	Stephen Whitefield	60	0.57%	–
Total		10,602	–	–
Rejected, spoiled and declined		N/A	–	–
Eligible electors / turnout		15,357	69.04%	-2.03%
Progressive Conservative hold		Swing		19.12%
Source(s) Source: "Calgary-North Hill Official Results 1975 Alberta general election". Alberta Heritage Community Foundation.

=== 1979 ===
1979 Alberta general election
Party	Candidate	Votes	%	±%
Progressive Conservative	Ed Oman	6,760	64.82%	1.88%
Social Credit	Dennis Shupe	1,799	17.25%	-6.92%
New Democratic	Agnes Middleton	1,052	10.09%	3.27%
Liberal	Dorothy Groves	747	7.16%	1.65%
Independent	John J. Jasienczyk	71	0.68%	–
Total		10,429	–	–
Rejected, spoiled and declined		N/A	–	–
Eligible electors / turnout		18,983	54.94%	-14.10%
Progressive Conservative hold		Swing		4.40%
Source(s) Source: "Calgary-North Hill Official Results 1979 Alberta general election". Alberta Heritage Community Foundation.

=== 1982 ===
1982 Alberta general election
Party	Candidate	Votes	%	±%
Progressive Conservative	Ed Oman	9,168	72.82%	8.00%
New Democratic	Agnes Middleton	1,753	13.92%	3.84%
Western Canada Concept	Gordon Kennard	968	7.69%	–
Liberal	Dorothy Groves	701	5.57%	-1.59%
Total		12,590	–	–
Rejected, spoiled and declined		55	–	–
Eligible electors / turnout		19,965	63.34%	8.40%
Progressive Conservative hold		Swing		5.66%
Source(s) Source: "Calgary-North Hill Official Results 1982 Alberta general election". Alberta Heritage Community Foundation.

=== 1986 ===
1986 Alberta general election
Party	Candidate	Votes	%	±%
Progressive Conservative	Fred Stewart	5,545	54.44%	-18.38%
New Democratic	Noel Jantzie	2,940	28.87%	14.94%
Liberal	Pauline Kay	1,189	11.67%	6.11%
Representative	Tom Gorman	511	5.02%	–
Total		10,185	–	–
Rejected, spoiled and declined		34	–	–
Eligible electors / turnout		23,274	43.91%	-19.43%
Progressive Conservative hold		Swing		-16.66%
Source(s) Source: "Calgary-North Hill Official Results 1986 Alberta general election". Alberta Heritage Community Foundation.

=== 1989 ===
1989 Alberta general election
Party	Candidate	Votes	%	±%
Progressive Conservative	Fred Stewart	4,918	44.73%	-9.72%
Liberal	Pauline Kay	3,030	27.56%	15.88%
New Democratic	Emily Drzymala	2,720	24.74%	-4.13%
Independent	John Jasienczyk	328	2.98%	–
Total		10,996	–	–
Rejected, spoiled and declined		33	–	–
Eligible electors / turnout		22,933	48.09%	4.18%
Progressive Conservative hold		Swing		-4.20%
Source(s) Source: "Calgary-North Hill Official Results 1989 Alberta general election". Alberta Heritage Community Foundation.

=== 1993 ===
1993 Alberta general election
Party	Candidate	Votes	%	±%
Progressive Conservative	Richard Magnus	6,756	50.02%	5.29%
Liberal	Tom Dixon	4,262	31.55%	4.00%
New Democratic	Wendy Charlton	1,935	14.33%	-10.41%
Independent	Michael O'Malley	394	2.92%	-0.07%
Natural Law	Joyce Gregson	160	1.18%	–
Total		13,507	–	–
Rejected, spoiled and declined		40	–	–
Eligible electors / turnout		24,143	56.11%	8.02%
Progressive Conservative hold		Swing		0.65%
Source(s) Source: "Calgary-North Hill Official Results 1993 Alberta general election". Alberta Heritage Community Foundation.

=== 1997 ===
1997 Alberta general election
Party	Candidate	Votes	%	±%
Progressive Conservative	Richard Magnus	6,379	58.74%	8.73%
Liberal	John Schmale	3,297	30.36%	-1.19%
New Democratic	Jason Ness	1,183	10.89%	-3.43%
Total		10,859	–	–
Rejected, spoiled and declined		71	–	–
Eligible electors / turnout		22,524	48.53%	-7.59%
Progressive Conservative hold		Swing		4.96%
Source(s) Source: "Calgary-North Hill Official Results 1997 Alberta general election". Alberta Heritage Community Foundation.

=== 2001 ===
2001 Alberta general election
Party	Candidate	Votes	%	±%
Progressive Conservative	Richard Magnus	7,034	63.75%	5.00%
Liberal	Darryl G. Hawkins	2,529	22.92%	-7.44%
New Democratic	Christine McGregor	1,067	9.67%	-1.22%
Greens	Darcy Kraus	404	3.66%	–
Total		11,034	–	–
Rejected, spoiled, and declined		26	–	–
Eligible electors / turnout		22,630	48.87%	0.35%
Progressive Conservative hold		Swing		6.22%
Source(s) Source: "Calgary-North Hill Official Results 2001 Alberta general election" (PDF). Elections Alberta.

=== 2004 ===
2004 Alberta general election
Party	Candidate	Votes	%	±%
Progressive Conservative	Richard Magnus	4,369	43.21%	-20.54%
Liberal	Pat Murray	3,212	31.76%	8.84%
Greens	Susan Stratton	1,261	12.47%	8.81%
New Democratic	Aileen L. Machell	643	6.36%	-3.31%
Alberta Alliance	Brent Best	627	6.20%	–
Total		10,112	–	–
Rejected, spoiled and declined		59	–	–
Eligible electors / turnout		22,987	44.25%	-4.63%
Progressive Conservative hold		Swing		-14.69%
Source(s) Source: "Calgary-North Hill Statement of Official Results 2004 Alberta general election" (PDF). Elections Alberta. "2004 Alberta general election". Elections Alberta.

=== 2008 ===
2008 Alberta general election
Party	Candidate	Votes	%	±%
Progressive Conservative	Kyle Fawcett	4,281	38.32%	-4.88%
Liberal	Pat Murray	3,573	31.98%	0.22%
New Democratic	John Chan	1,381	12.36%	6.00%
Wildrose Alliance	Jane Morgan	976	8.74%	–
Green	Kevin Maloney	732	6.55%	-5.92%
Social Credit	Jim Wright	228	2.04%	–
Total		11,171	–	–
Rejected, spoiled and declined		37	–	–
Eligible electors / turnout		27,219	41.18%	-3.07%
Progressive Conservative hold		Swing		-2.55%
Source(s) Source: The Report on the March 3, 2008 Provincial General Election of the Twenty-seventh Legislative Assembly (PDF). Elections Alberta. July 28, 2008. pp. 242–245.

== Senate nominee election results ==
=== 2004 ===
2004 Senate nominee election results: Calgary-North Hill				Turnout 44.31%	
Affiliation	Candidate	Votes	% votes	% ballots	Rank
Progressive Conservative	Bert Brown	3,890	16.36%	48.52%	1
Progressive Conservative	Jim Silye	3,463	14.57%	43.19%	5
Progressive Conservative	Betty Unger	3,004	12.64%	37.47%	2
Independent	Link Byfield	2,796	11.76%	34.87%	4
Independent	Tom Sindlinger	2,285	9.61%	28.50%	9
Progressive Conservative	David Usherwood	2,034	8.56%	25.37%	6
Progressive Conservative	Cliff Breitkreuz	1,870	7.87%	23.32%	3
Alberta Alliance	Vance Gough	1,605	6.75%	20.02%	8
Alberta Alliance	Michael Roth	1,506	6.33%	18.78%	7
Alberta Alliance	Gary Horan	1,321	5.55%	16.48%	10
Total votes		23,774	100%		
Total ballots		8,018	2.97 votes per ballot		
Rejected, spoiled and declined		2,168			

Voters had the option of selecting four candidates on the ballot

== 2004 student vote results ==
Participating schools
James Fowler High School
King George-Traditional Learning Centre
Rosemont Elementary
Saint Francis High School
Truth Academy

On November 19, 2004, a student vote was conducted at participating Alberta schools to parallel the 2004 Alberta general election results. The vote was designed to educate students and simulate the electoral process for persons who have not yet reached the legal majority. The vote was conducted in 80 of the 83 provincial electoral districts with students voting for actual election candidates. Schools with a large student body that reside in another electoral district had the option to vote for candidates outside of the electoral district then where they were physically located.

2004 Alberta student vote results'
Affiliation	Candidate	Votes	%
Progressive Conservative	Richard Magnus	160	35.48%
Green	Susan Stratton	97	21.51%
Liberal	Pat Murray	86	19.07%
Alberta Alliance	Brent Best	60	13.30%
NDP	Aileen Machell	48	10.64%
Total		451	100%
Rejected, spoiled and declined		6	

== See also ==
- List of Alberta provincial electoral districts
- Canadian provincial electoral districts
