= Jim Horsman =

Canadian politician

The Honourable James Deverell Horsman CM, ECA, AOE

Member of the Legislative Assembly of Alberta for Medicine Hat Medicine Hat-Redcliff (1975-1979)
- In office March 25, 1975 – June 15, 1993
- Preceded by: William Wyse
- Succeeded by: Rob Renner

Minister of Advanced Education and Manpower
- In office March 23, 1979 – November 18, 1982
- Preceded by: Bert Hohol
- Succeeded by: Ernie Isley

Minister of Federal and Intergovernmental Affairs
- In office November 19, 1982 – December 14, 1992
- Preceded by: Archibald Johnston
- Succeeded by: Peter Elzinga

Attorney General
- In office May 26, 1986 – September 7, 1988
- Preceded by: Neil Crawford
- Succeeded by: Ken Rostad

3rd Deputy Premier of Alberta
- In office April 14, 1989 – December 14, 1992
- Preceded by: David Russell
- Succeeded by: Ken Kowalski

Personal details
- Born: July 29, 1935 (age 91) Camrose, Alberta
- Party: Progressive Conservative
- Spouse: Betty Whitney
- Education: University of British Columbia

James Deverell Horsman, CM, ECA, AOE (born July 29, 1935) is a politician from Alberta, Canada. He served in the Legislative Assembly of Alberta from 1975 to 1993 and held numerous cabinet portfolios in the government of Alberta.

== Early life ==
James Deverell Horsman was born in Camrose, Alberta in 1935 to George Cornwall Horsman and Kathleen Deverell Horsman. He grew up in Meeting Creek with his grandparents while his mother and father served overseas in Second World War. His family later moved to Moose Jaw, Saskatchewan. Horsman moved west in the 1950s to study at the University of British Columbia.

At UBC, Horsman attained a Bachelor of Commerce degree in 1959 and a year later attained a Bachelor of Laws. During this time Horsman participated in a number of extracurricular activities including being a member of UBC Alma Mater Society, the coordinator of activities and the coordinator of publications. After university, Horsman moved back east to Calgary to start practicing law, and moved to Medicine Hat a short time later after visiting family and meeting a potential law partner. After moving to Medicine Hat he met Betty Whitney, a local high school teacher; they would get married on July 4, 1964 and have three daughters.

== Political career ==
Horsman became involved in the Alberta Progressive Conservatives in the early 1960s. He served on the party's executive council as vice president for Southern Alberta before running for political office.

Horsman first ran for a seat to the 16th Alberta Legislature in the 1967 general election, in the electoral district of Medicine Hat. He was defeated by Social Credit incumbent MLA Harry Leinweber. Horseman would run again in the Medicine Hat-Redcliff electoral district in 1971 and lost to Social Credit candidate William Wyse.

Horsman ran against Wyse again in the 1975 general election and was successful this time, defeating Wyse by 100 votes. In 1979 Medicine Hat-Redcliff was abolished due to redistribution, and Horsman ran for re-election in Medicine Hat that year. He won by nearly 8,000 votes over his nearest opponent. Horsman won by another large majority in the 1982 general election.

Horsman's share of the vote was cut in half in the 1986 general election, but he still won by a comfortable margin. He won again handily in the 1989 general election. He retired from the Assembly at dissolution in 1993.

Horsman would serve a number of roles in provincial cabinet including Minister of Advanced Education and Manpower, Minister of Federal and Intergovernmental Affairs, Attorney General and Provincial Secretary, Government House Leader and Deputy Premier. As Minister of Federal and Intergovernmental Affairs Horsman was responsible for constitutional negotiations for the 10 years following the Patriation of the Constitution until the Charlottetown Accord.

== Late life ==
After leaving political office, Horsman became Alberta's chief NAFTA negotiator.

Horsman continued to serve on numerous other boards and public service roles, including as chair of the board of governors for Medicine Hat College and later as chancellor for the University of Lethbridge from 1999 to 2003. Horsman would be awarded with an honorary Doctor of Laws from the University of Lethbridge.

Horsman was number of awards including Queen Elizabeth II Silver and Golden Jubilee Medals, the Governor General’s 125th Anniversary Medal and the Alberta Centennial Medal.

Horsman was appointed as a member of the Order of Canada on April 6, 2006, his award cited his history in public service, volunteering and advocacy for a strong public education system. As a member of the Order of Canada Horsman has continued to preside over citizenship ceremonies in the Southern Alberta region.
