= Hector Lang =

Canadian politician

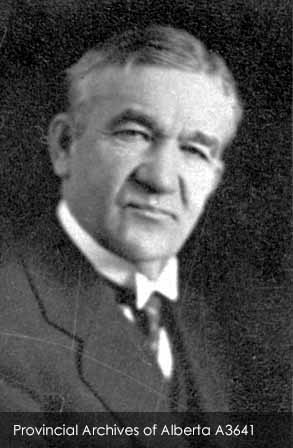

Member of the Legislative Assembly of Alberta
- In office May 1, 1928 – August 22, 1935
- Preceded by: Charles Pingle
- Succeeded by: John Robinson
- Constituency: Medicine Hat

Personal details
- Born: September 5, 1871
- Died: March 11, 1952 (aged 80)
- Party: Liberal

Hector Lang (September 5, 1871 – March 11, 1952) was a provincial level politician from Alberta, Canada. He served as a member of the Legislative Assembly of Alberta from 1928 to 1935 sitting with the opposition Liberal caucus.

== Political career ==
Lang ran for a seat to the Alberta Legislature in a by-election held in the Medicine Hat electoral district on May 1, 1928. Lang faced three other candidates winning almost 40% to head the polls on the first count. On the second count Lang was just shy of a majority. He won the district on the third count to earn his first term in office and hold the district for the Liberals.

Two years later Lang would run for a second term in office in the 1930 Alberta general election. Like the by-election in 1928 this election would also go to transfers. On the first count Lang nearly won outright winning almost 46% of the vote. He won on the second count after second place choices gave him nearly 60%.

Lang would run for a third term in office in the 1935 Alberta general election. He would be defeated in a landslide by Social Credit candidate John Robinson finishing a distant second in the three way race.
