= Medicine Hat (provincial electoral district) =

Defunct provincial electoral district in Alberta, Canada

Coordinates: 50.06°N 110.69°W

Alberta electoral district
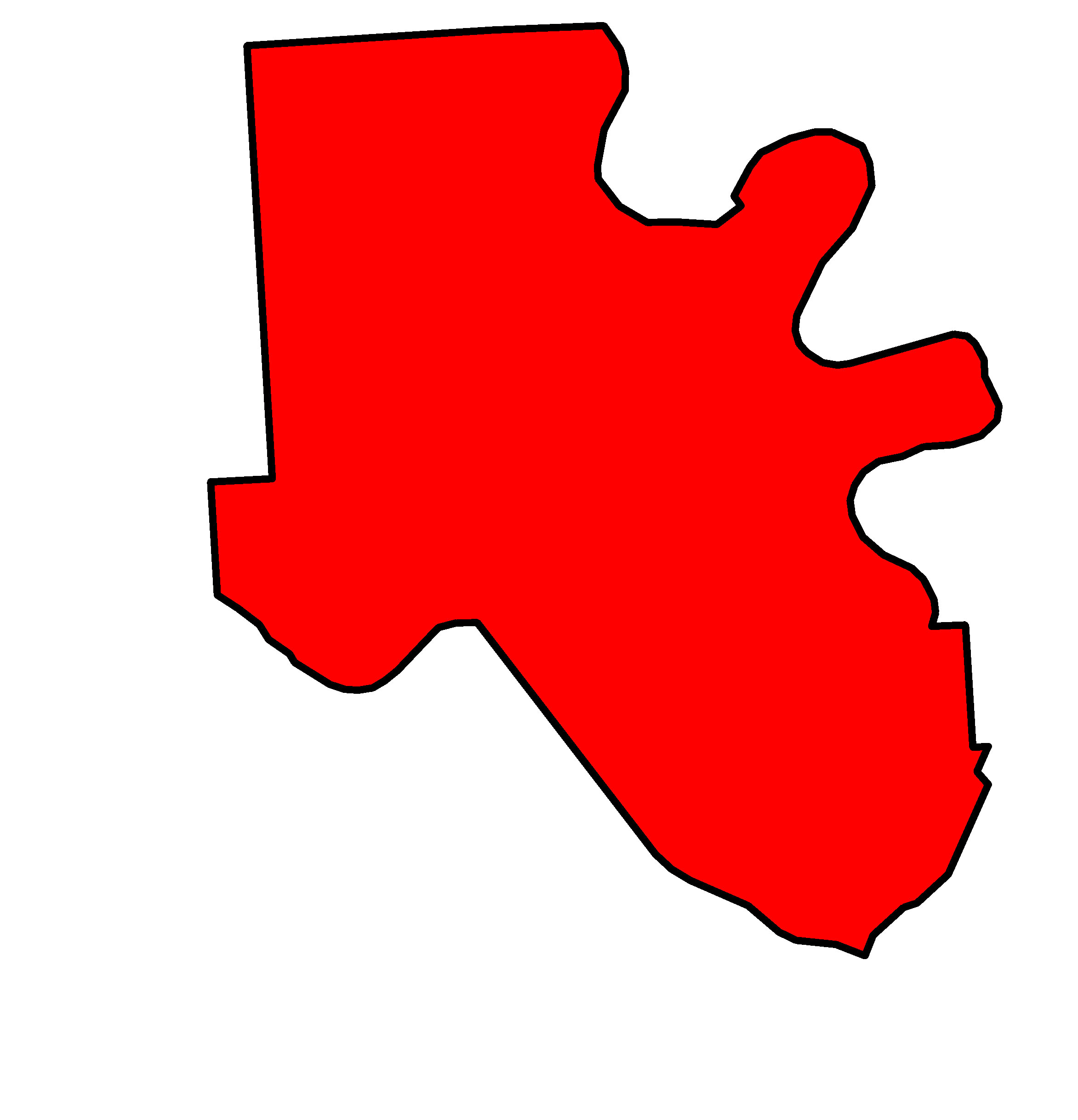
- 2010 boundaries

Defunct provincial electoral district
- Legislature: Legislative Assembly of Alberta
- District created: 1905
- District abolished: 1971
- District re-created: 1979
- District re-abolished: 2017
- First contested: 1905
- Last contested: 2015

Medicine Hat was a provincial electoral district in Alberta, Canada, mandated to return members to the Legislative Assembly of Alberta from 1905 to 1971, and again from 1979 to 2019. The electoral district was named after the city of Medicine Hat.

== History ==
The electoral district of Medicine Hat has existed in two iterations. The Medicine Hat electoral district was one of the original 25 electoral districts contested in the 1905 Alberta general election after Alberta became a province in September 1905. The district was carried over from the old Medicine Hat electoral district which had returned a single member to the Legislative Assembly of the Northwest Territories from 1888 to 1905. The former member for the Northwest Territories seat, William Finlay was elected in the 1st Alberta general election. Upon the electoral district's formation, it covered a large portion of rural southeast Alberta. The district shrunk until it became an urban only riding containing the City of Medicine Hat.

In 1921 Medicine Hat was given a second MLA. In 1921 The Medicine Hat MLAs were elected using plurality block voting. In 1926 STV was used to elect Medicine Hat MLAs. From 1930 to 1956, the district used instant-runoff voting to elect its MLA.

The district was abolished in the 1971 electoral district re-distribution to become part of Medicine Hat-Redcliff, which was abolished in 1979 and once again became the Medicine Hat electoral district.

Under the 2004 Alberta electoral boundary re-distribution, the constituency covered the portion of the city north of the South Saskatchewan River, the Trans-Canada Highway and Carry Drive. The rest of the city and surrounding area was part of the Cypress-Medicine Hat constituency.

The 2010 electoral boundary re-distribution saw minor changes made to align the riding with new boundaries of Medicine Hat.

The Medicine Hat electoral district was dissolved in the 2017 electoral boundary re-distribution, and portions of the district would incorporate the Brooks-Medicine Hat to the North, and Cypress-Medicine Hat to the South for the 2019 Alberta general election.

The decision to split the riding has been seen as an attempt as gerrymandering due to combining urban voters in the city of Medicine Hat with surrounding rural areas. In 2026, city officials and former MLAs of began calling for a return of the city's singular urban provincial riding, positing that one representative with a single urban focus would be better than two who divide their time, and such a change would also give the city more prominence in provincial matters.

=== Boundary history ===
(1) Medicine Hat 1905 boundaries
Bordering districts
North	East	West	South
Lacombe and Vermilion	Saskatchewan boundary	Cardson, Gleichen, Innisfail, Lethbridge, Red Deer and Rosebud	Montana boundary
riding map goes here		map in relation to other districts in Alberta goes here	
Legal description from An Act to establish and provide for the Government of the Province of Alberta 1905.
The electoral division of Medicine Hat, bounded as follows:– Commencing at the intersection of the eastern boundary of the said province of Alberta by the north boundary of the 38th township; thence westerly along the north boundary of the 38th townships to the meridian between the 10th and 11th ranges, west of the 4th meridian; thence southerly along the meridian between the 10th and 11th ranges to the southern boundary of the said province of Alberta; thence easterly along the said southern boundary of the province of Alberta to the southeast corner thereof; thence northerly along the eastern boundary of the said province of Alberta to the point of commencement.
Note: Original electoral boundaries

68 Medicine Hat 2003 boundaries
Bordering districts
North	East	West	South
Cypress-Medicine Hat
Legal description from the Statutes of Alberta 2003, Electoral Divisions Act.
Starting at the intersection of the west Medicine Hat city boundary with the north Medicine Hat city boundary; then 1. generally east and southeast along the city boundary to the northeasterly extension of Carry Drive; 2. southwest along the extension and Carry Drive and its southwesterly extension to the Trans Canada highway; 3. northwest along the Trans Canada highway to the left bank of the South Saskatchewan River; 4. west along the left bank to the west Medicine Hat city boundary; 5. generally north, east and north to the starting point.
Note:

72 Medicine Hat 2010 boundaries
Bordering districts
North	East	West	South
Cypress-Medicine Hat
Legal description from the Statutes of Alberta 2010, Electoral Divisions Act.

=== Representation history ===
Members of the Legislative Assembly for Medicine Hat
Assembly	Years	Member		Party	
See Medicine Hat (N.W.T.) 1888–1905
1st	1905–1909	William Finlay		Liberal	
2nd	1909–1910	William Finlay		Liberal	
2nd	1910	Vacant			
2nd	1910–1913	Charles Mitchell		Liberal	
3rd	1913–1917	Nelson Spencer		Conservative	
4th	1917–1921	Nelson Spencer		Conservative	
5th	1921	William; Johnston	Dominion; Labor	Perren Baker	UFA
5th	1921	William; Johnston	Dominion; Labor	Vacant	
5th	1921–1925	William; Johnston	Dominion; Labor	Perren Baker	UFA
5th	1925	Vacant		Perren Baker	UFA
5th	1925–1926	Charles; Pingle	Liberal	Perren Baker	UFA
6th	1926–1928	Charles; Pingle	Liberal	J.J. Hendricks	Conservative
6th	1928	Vacant		J.J. Hendricks	Conservative
6th	1928–1930	Hector Lang	Liberal	J.J. Hendricks	Conservative
7th	1930–1935	Hector Lang	Liberal		
8th	1935–1940	John Robinson		Social Credit	
9th	1940–1944	John Robinson		Social Credit	
10th	1944–1948	John Robinson		Social Credit	
11th	1948–1952	John Robinson		Social Credit	
12th	1952–1953	John Robinson		Social Credit	
12th	1953	Vacant			
12th	1953–1955	Elizabeth Robinson		Social Credit	
13th	1955–1959	Elizabeth Robinson		Social Credit	
14th	1959–1960	Elizabeth Robinson		Social Credit	
14th	1960–1961	Vacant			
14th	1961–1963	Harry Leinweber		Social Credit	
15th	1963–1967	Harry Leinweber		Social Credit	
16th	1967–1971	Harry Leinweber		Social Credit	
See Medicine Hat-Redcliff 1971-1979
19th	1979–1982	Jim Horsman		Progressive; Conservative	
20th	1982–1986	Jim Horsman		Progressive; Conservative	
21st	1986–1989	Jim Horsman		Progressive; Conservative	
22nd	1989–1993	Jim Horsman		Progressive; Conservative	
23rd	1993–1997	Rob Renner		Progressive; Conservative	
24th	1997–2001	Rob Renner		Progressive; Conservative	
25th	2001–2004	Rob Renner		Progressive; Conservative	
26th	2004–2008	Rob Renner		Progressive; Conservative	
27th	2008–2012	Rob Renner		Progressive; Conservative	
28th	2012–2014	Blake Pedersen		Wildrose	
28th	2014–2015	Blake Pedersen		Progressive; Conservative	
29th	2015–2019	Bob Wanner		New Democratic	
See Cypress-Medicine Hat and Brooks-Medicine Hat 2019–

The provincial electoral district of Medicine Hat has a long history that goes back to 1888 under the old Medicine Hat, North-West Territories electoral district. The district was carried over when the province of Alberta was created in 1905.

The first election in 1905 saw former North-West Territories Assembly member William Finlay win the district in a hotly contested race. Finlay was re-elected in 1909 and resigned in 1910 so cabinet minister Charles Mitchell could have a seat in the Legislature.

Mitchell held the district for one term before being defeated by Conservative Nelson Spencer in the 1913 election. Spencer's win was considered an upset. Spencer was automatically re-elected under Chapter 38 of the Elections Act in 1917 for serving in the Canadian Army during World War I. He retired from the Legislature in 1921 and moved to British Columbia.

The Liberal government passed a law in 1921 that turned Medicine Hat into a two-member district. The seats were won in the 1921 general election by United Farmer of Alberta candidate Perren Baker and Dominion Labour Party candidate William Johnston. Baker was confirmed to a cabinet post by acclamation in a ministerial by-election on December 9, 1921.

Johnson died in 1925, vacating his seat. The subsequent by-election saw former Speaker of the Legislature Charles Pingle win the district for the Liberal party, defeating a Liberal and a Conservative.

The district also returned two members in 1926. This time they were elected through Single transferable voting. Baker moved to the Cypress electoral district. Pingle stood for re-election. Liberal Pingle and Conservative J.J. Hendricks were elected in this election. This was the first — and only — election held in this district using STV.

Before the next general election the vote district was re-drawn smaller and only given one member and the method of election was changed to Instant-runoff voting. From 1930 to 1956, the district used instant-runoff voting to elect its MLA.

Pingle died in 1928, forcing a by-election. Liberal candidate Hector Lang retained the seat for the party. He was re-elected in 1930 and was defeated, when he ran for a third term in 1935, by Social Credit candidate John Robinson.

Robinson held the district for five terms, being re-elected in 1940, 1944, 1948, and 1952. He was appointed Minister of Industries and Labour by Premier Ernest Manning in 1948 and held that post until his death in 1953.

The by-election in 1953 saw John Robinson's wife Elizabeth Robinson retain the seat for Social Credit. The by-election used instant-runoff voting to elect its MLA. Elizabeth Robinson held the district for three terms before her death in 1961.

The last by-election held in the district in 1961 saw Harry Leinweber become the third member of Social Credit to win the district seat. He was re-elected in 1963 and 1967 before retiring in 1971.

Medicine Hat was redistributed to include the town of Redcliff in 1971 boundary redistribution. The new riding was called Medicine Hat-Redcliff. The electoral district of Medicine Hat was re-created in 1979 containing just the city of Medicine Hat.

The first election in the new Medicine Hat district saw former Medicine Hat-Redcliff incumbent Jim Horsman won the district in a landslide winning a 10,000 vote margin over the second place candidate. He would improve on that victory winning his biggest margin in the 1982 general election finishing almost 12,000 votes ahead of second place. He was also re-elected in 1986 and 1989 before retiring in 1993.

Rob Renner was elected as a Progressive Conservative candidate for the first time in the 1993 general election. He was re-elected in 1997, 2001, 2004, and 2008.

Blake Pedersen was elected as a Wildrose candidate in 2012. On December 17, 2014, he was one of nine Wildrose MLAs who crossed the floor to join the Alberta Progressive Conservative caucus.

Bob Wanner was elected as a New Democratic Party (NDP) candidate in 2015.

== Legislature election results ==
=== 1905 ===
1905 Alberta general election
Party	Candidate	Votes	%	±%
Liberal	William T. Finlay	575	51.71%	–
Conservative	Francis O. Sissions	537	48.29%	–
Total		1,112	–	–
Rejected, spoiled and declined		N/A	–	–
Eligible electors / turnout		N/A	N/A	–
Liberal pickup new district.				
Source(s) Source: "Medicine Hat Official Results 1905 Alberta general election". Alberta Heritage Community Foundation.

=== 1909 ===
1909 Alberta general election
Party	Candidate	Votes	%	±%
Liberal	William T. Finlay	1,249	71.66%	19.95%
Conservative	Francis O. Sissions	494	28.34%	-19.95%
Total		1,743	–	–
Rejected, spoiled and declined		N/A	–	–
Eligible electors / turnout		N/A	N/A	–
Liberal hold		Swing		19.95%
Source(s) Source: "Medicine Hat Official Results 1909 Alberta general election". Alberta Heritage Community Foundation.

=== 1910 by-election ===
Alberta provincial by-election, June 29, 1910 Upon the resignation of William T. Finlay
Party	Candidate	Votes	%	±%
Liberal	Charles Richmond Mitchell	1,134	62.86%	-8.80%
Conservative	Walter Huckvale	670	37.14%	8.80%
Total		1,804	–	–
Rejected, spoiled and declined		N/A	–	–
Eligible electors / turnout		N/A	N/A	–
Liberal hold		Swing		-8.80%
Source(s) "By-elections". elections.ab.ca. Elections Alberta.

=== 1913 ===
1913 Alberta general election
Party	Candidate	Votes	%	±%
Conservative	Nelson Spencer	1,843	50.27%	12.58%
Liberal	Charles Richmond Mitchell	1,823	49.73%	-12.58%
Total		3,666	–	–
Rejected, spoiled and declined		N/A	–	–
Eligible electors / turnout		N/A	N/A	–
Conservative gain from Liberal		Swing		-12.58%
Source(s) Source: "Medicine Hat Official Results 1913 Alberta general election". Alberta Heritage Community Foundation.

=== 1917 ===
1917 Alberta general election
Party	Candidate	Votes	%	±%
Conservative	Nelson Spencer	Acclaimed	–	–
Total		N/A	–	–
Rejected, spoiled and declined		N/A	–	–
Eligible electors / turnout		N/A	N/A	–
Conservative hold		Swing		N/A
Source(s) Source: "Medicine Hat Official Results 1917 Alberta general election". Alberta Heritage Community Foundation. One of eleven Members of the Legislative Assembly of Alberta acclaimed under The Elections Act Section 38, which stipulated that any member of the 3rd Alberta Legislative Assembly would be guaranteed re-election, with no contest held, if the member joined for wartime service in the First World War. An Act amending The Election Act respecting Members of the Legislative Assembly on Active Service., SA 1917, c. 38

=== 1921 ===
1921 Alberta general election
Party	Candidate	Votes	%	Elected
United Farmers	Perren E. Baker	4,165	65.52%	✓
Labour	William G. Johnston	3,602	56.66%	✓
Liberal	Oliver Boyd	2,278	35.83%	–
Liberal	H. H. Foster	2,013	31.67%	–
Total		6,357	–	–
Source(s) Source: "Medicine Hat Official Results 1921 Alberta general election". Alberta Heritage Community Foundation. Two members were elected to the Legislature, and electors had the option of voting for up to two candidates.

=== 1921 by-election ===
Alberta provincial by-election, December 9, 1921 Ministerial by-election upon Perren E. Baker's appointment to Cabinet
Party	Candidate	Votes
United Farmers	Perren E. Baker	Acclaimed
Source(s) "By-elections". elections.ab.ca. Elections Alberta.

Due to laws existing in the Legislative Assembly Act a series of ministerial by-elections were needed to confirm members appointed to the Greenfield government. Seven by-elections in total were called for an election day of December 9, 1921. This was set for one week after the 1921 Canadian federal election.

The by-election writ was dropped on November 16, 1921, United Farmers incumbent Perren Baker who had been appointed as Minister of Education ran unopposed and was acclaimed at the nomination deadline held on December 2, 1921. The timing of the by-elections was deliberately chosen to coincide with the federal election to ensure that opposition candidates would be unlikely to oppose the cabinet ministers.

=== 1925 by-election ===
This by-election was conducted using instant-runoff voting.

September 29, 1925 by-election results		Turnout 74.56%				Swing compared to 1921
Affiliation	Candidate	1st	%	2nd	%	Party
Liberal	Charles Pingle	1,640	41.48%	1,914	55.17%	5.89%
Farmer-Labor	William McCombs	1,302	32.94%	1,555	44.83%	-31.47%^{1}
Conservative	Joseph Hendrick	1,011	25.58%			*
Total		3,953	100%	3,469	100%	
Exhausted Ballots		0		484		
Rejected, spoiled and declined		Unknown				
5,302 eligible electors
Liberal pickup from Dominion Labor					Swing compared to 1921 18.68%	

1. William McCombs was a candidate jointly nominated by the United Farmers of Alberta and the Dominion Labor Party. The party percent change is reflected from the combined party percentages in the 1921 general election.

=== 1926 ===
Two Members elected through STV. Pingle and Hendricks both elected.

1926 Alberta general election
Party	Candidate	Votes 1st count	%	Votes final count	±%
Liberal	Charles S. Pingle	1,574	44.08%	1,701	2.60%
Conservative	Joseph J. Hendricks	1,279	35.82%	1,487	9.75%
Dominion Labor	James Hole	718	20.11%	–	-12.83%
Total		3,571	–	–	–
Rejected, spoiled and declined		264	–	–	–
Eligible electors / turnout		5,302	72.33%	–	–
Liberal hold		Swing		6.81%	
Source(s) Source: "Medicine Hat Official Results 1926 Alberta general election". Alberta Heritage Community Foundation. Instant-runoff voting requires a candidate to receive a plurality (greater than 50%) of the votes. As no candidate received a plurality of votes, the bottom candidate was eliminated and their 2nd place votes were applied to both other candidates until one received a plurality.

=== 1928 by-election ===
May 1, 1928 by-election results		Turnout 66.05%						1st Count Swing	
Affiliation	Candidate	1st	%	2nd	3rd	4th	%	Party	Personal
Liberal	Hector Lang	1,355	39.90%	1,405	1,603	1,604	59.12%	-4.18%	*
Conservative	Joseph Hendrick	941	27.71%	986	1,106	1,109	40.88%	-8.11%	
Dominion Labor	William McCombs	810	23.85%	844				3.74%	*
Independent	B.J. Bott	290	8.54%					*	
Total		3,396	100%	3,235	2,709	2,713	100%		
Exhausted Ballots		0		161	529	-4			
Rejected, spoiled and declined		106							
5,302 eligible electors
Liberal hold							1st Count Swing -6.15%		

=== 1930 ===
1930 Alberta general election
Party	Candidate	Votes 1st count	%	Votes final count	±%
Liberal	Hector Lang	1,774	45.97%	2,046	6.07%
Conservative	C. S. Blanchard	1,150	29.80%	1,365	-2.09%
Independent	Issac Bullivant	935	24.23%	–	–
Total		3,859	–	–	–
Rejected, spoiled and declined		336	–	–	–
Eligible electors / turnout		5,662	74.09%	1.76%	–
Liberal hold		Swing		3.95%	
Source(s) Source: "Medicine Hat Official Results 1930 Alberta general election". Alberta Heritage Community Foundation. Instant-runoff voting requires a candidate to receive a plurality (greater than 50%) of the votes. As no candidate received a plurality of votes, the bottom candidate was eliminated and their 2nd place votes were applied to both other candidates until one received a plurality.

=== 1935 ===
1935 Alberta general election
Party	Candidate	Votes	%	±%
Social Credit	John Lyle Robinson	3,236	62.94%	–
Liberal	Hector Lang	1,252	24.35%	-21.62%
Conservative	Issac Bullivant	653	12.70%	-17.10%
Total		5,141	–	–
Rejected, spoiled and declined		117	–	–
Eligible electors / turnout		6,315	83.26%	9.17%
Social Credit gain from Liberal		Swing		11.21%
Source(s) Source: "Medicine Hat Official Results 1935 Alberta general election". Alberta Heritage Community Foundation.

=== 1940 ===
1940 Alberta general election
Party	Candidate	Votes	%	±%
Social Credit	John Lyle Robinson	2,943	50.69%	-12.26%
Independent	W. C. Yuill	2,863	49.31%	–
Total		5,806	–	–
Rejected, spoiled and declined		169	–	–
Eligible electors / turnout		6,942	86.07%	2.81%
Social Credit hold		Swing		-18.61%
Source(s) Source: "Medicine Hat Official Results 1940 Alberta general election". Alberta Heritage Community Foundation.

=== 1944 ===
1944 Alberta general election
Party	Candidate	Votes	%	±%
Social Credit	John Lyle Robinson	2,977	55.48%	4.79%
Independent	John A.M. Bell	1,457	27.15%	–
Co-operative Commonwealth	Russell A. Price	696	12.97%	–
Labor-Progressive	Edwin W. Horne	236	4.40%	–
Total		5,366	–	–
Rejected, spoiled and declined		224	–	–
Eligible electors / turnout		7,844	71.26%	-14.81%
Social Credit hold		Swing		13.47%
Source(s) Source: "Medicine Hat Official Results 1944 Alberta general election". Alberta Heritage Community Foundation.

=== 1948 ===
1948 Alberta general election
Party	Candidate	Votes	%	±%
Social Credit	John Lyle Robinson	3,835	65.29%	9.81%
Liberal	David R. Broadfoot	1,043	17.76%	–
Co-operative Commonwealth	Ian MacLachlan Arrol	996	16.96%	3.99%
Total		5,874	–	–
Rejected, spoiled and declined		596	–	–
Eligible electors / turnout		10,103	64.04%	-7.22%
Social Credit hold		Swing		9.60%
Source(s) Source: "Medicine Hat Official Results 1948 Alberta general election". Alberta Heritage Community Foundation.

=== 1952 ===
1952 Alberta general election
Party	Candidate	Votes	%	±%
Social Credit	John Lyle Robinson	4,724	74.69%	9.40%
Liberal	James Lyle Wyatt	1,601	25.31%	7.56%
Total		6,325	–	–
Rejected, spoiled and declined		346	–	–
Eligible electors / turnout		11,336	58.85%	-5.19%
Social Credit hold		Swing		0.92%
Source(s) Source: "Medicine Hat Official Results 1952 Alberta general election". Alberta Heritage Community Foundation.

=== 1953 by-election ===
December 21, 1953 by-election results		Turnout 28.44%		Swing	
Affiliation	Candidate	Votes	%	Party	Personal
Social Credit	Elizabeth Robinson	2,462	76.89%	2.19%	*
Co-operative Commonwealth	E.W. Horne	740	23.11%	*	
Total		3,202	100%		
Rejected, spoiled and declined		200			
11,964 Eligible Electors
Social Credit hold				Swing 12.65%	

=== 1955 ===
1955 Alberta general election
Party	Candidate	Votes	%	±%
Social Credit	Elizabeth G. Robinson	5,066	67.25%	-9.64%
Liberal	James W. McLane	1,862	24.72%	–
Co-operative Commonwealth	K. L. Brucker	605	8.03%	-15.08%
Total		7,533	–	–
Rejected, spoiled and declined		436	–	–
Eligible electors / turnout		12,915	61.70%	2.86%
Social Credit hold		Swing		-3.42%
Source(s) Source: "Medicine Hat Official Results 1955 Alberta general election". Alberta Heritage Community Foundation.

=== 1959 ===
1959 Alberta general election
Party	Candidate	Votes	%	±%
Social Credit	Elizabeth G. Robinson	5,604	66.12%	-1.13%
Progressive Conservative	John H. Cocks	1,780	21.00%	–
Liberal	Norma Deman	597	7.04%	-14.68%
Co-operative Commonwealth	John D. Rogers	495	5.84%	-2.19%
Total		8,476	–	–
Rejected, spoiled and declined		163	–	–
Eligible electors / turnout		13,957	61.90%	0.19%
Social Credit hold		Swing		1.29%
Source(s) Source: "Medicine Hat Official Results 1959 Alberta general election". Alberta Heritage Community Foundation.

=== 1961 by-election ===
Alberta provincial by-election, January 19, 1961 Upon the death of Elizabeth G. Robinson on October 21, 1960
Party	Candidate	Votes	%	±%
Social Credit	Harry C. Leinweber	4,573	56.82%	-9.20%
Liberal	David Broadfoot	2,475	30.75%	23.71%
Progressive Conservative	John Cocks	1,000	12.43%	-8.57%
Total		8,048	–	–
Rejected, spoiled and declined		N/A	–	–
Eligible electors / turnout		N/A	N/A	–
Social Credit hold		Swing		2.94%
Source(s) "By-elections". elections.ab.ca. Elections Alberta.

=== 1963 ===
1963 Alberta general election
Party	Candidate	Votes	%	±%
Social Credit	Harry C. Leinweber	4,954	51.93%	-4.89%
Liberal	Helen Beny Gibson	2,259	23.68%	-7.07%
Progressive Conservative	Kenneth Roy Biddell	1,485	15.57%	3.14%
New Democratic	Milton J. Reinhardt	841	8.82%	–
Total		9,539	–	–
Rejected, spoiled and declined		31	–	–
Eligible electors / turnout		15,921	60.11%	-1.79%
Social Credit hold		Swing		2.94%
Source(s) Source: "Medicine Hat Official Results 1963 Alberta general election". Alberta Heritage Community Foundation.

=== 1967 ===
1967 Alberta general election
Party	Candidate	Votes	%	±%
Social Credit	Harry C. Leinweber	4,390	40.15%	-11.79%
Progressive Conservative	Jim Horsman	2,701	24.70%	9.13%
Liberal	Roy Weidemann	2,025	18.52%	-5.16%
New Democratic	Ted. J. Grimm	1,819	16.63%	7.82%
Total		10,935	–	–
Rejected, spoiled and declined		50	–	–
Eligible electors / turnout		16,104	68.21%	8.10%
Social Credit hold		Swing		-6.40%
Source(s) Source: "Medicine Hat Official Results 1967 Alberta general election". Alberta Heritage Community Foundation.

=== 1979 ===
1979 Alberta general election
Party	Candidate	Votes	%	±%
Progressive Conservative	Jim Horsman	10,107	72.85%	–
Social Credit	Lee Anderson	1,904	13.72%	–
New Democratic	Frances Ost	1,134	8.17%	–
Liberal	Louise Mercier	729	5.25%	–
Total		13,874	–	–
Rejected, spoiled and declined		50	–	–
Eligible electors / turnout		23,646	58.89%	–
Progressive Conservative pickup new district.				
Source(s) Source: "Medicine Hat Official Results 1979 Alberta general election". Alberta Heritage Community Foundation.

=== 1982 ===
1982 Alberta general election
Party	Candidate	Votes	%	±%
Progressive Conservative	Jim Horsman	14,654	81.37%	8.53%
New Democratic	Clarence Smith	2,072	11.51%	3.33%
Western Canada Concept	David F. Lees	996	5.53%	–
Independent	Frank F. Cottingham	286	1.59%	–
Total		18,008	–	–
Rejected, spoiled and declined		38	–	–
Eligible electors / turnout		27,149	66.47%	7.58%
Progressive Conservative hold		Swing		5.37%
Source(s) Source: "Medicine Hat Official Results 1982 Alberta general election". Alberta Heritage Community Foundation.

=== 1986 ===
1986 Alberta general election
Party	Candidate	Votes	%	±%
Progressive Conservative	Jim Horsman	7,717	65.88%	-15.50%
Liberal	David J. Carter	2,624	22.40%	–
New Democratic	Stan Chmelyk	1,373	11.72%	0.22%
Total		11,714	–	–
Rejected, spoiled and declined		29	–	–
Eligible electors / turnout		28,185	41.66%	-24.81%
Progressive Conservative hold		Swing		-13.20%
Source(s) Source: "Medicine Hat Official Results 1986 Alberta general election". Alberta Heritage Community Foundation.

=== 1989 ===
1989 Alberta general election
Party	Candidate	Votes	%	±%
Progressive Conservative	Jim Horsman	6,465	41.01%	-24.87%
Liberal	Garth Vallely	5,213	33.06%	10.66%
New Democratic	Wally Regehr	4,088	25.93%	14.21%
Total		15,766	–	–
Rejected, spoiled and declined		49	–	–
Eligible electors / turnout		29,589	53.45%	11.78%
Progressive Conservative hold		Swing		-17.77%
Source(s) Source: "Medicine Hat Official Results 1989 Alberta general election". Alberta Heritage Community Foundation.

=== 1993 ===
1993 Alberta general election
Party	Candidate	Votes	%	±%
Progressive Conservative	Rob Renner	4,941	39.01%	-1.99%
Liberal	Garth Vallely	4,790	37.82%	4.76%
New Democratic	Bob Wanner	2,366	18.68%	-7.25%
Social Credit	Marcel Guay	568	4.48%	–
Total		12,665	–	–
Rejected, spoiled and declined		38	–	–
Eligible electors / turnout		22,665	56.05%	2.60%
Progressive Conservative hold		Swing		-3.37%
Source(s) Source: "Medicine Hat Official Results 1993 Alberta general election". Alberta Heritage Community Foundation.

=== 1997 ===
1997 Alberta general election
Party	Candidate	Votes	%	±%
Progressive Conservative	Rob Renner	5,853	51.67%	12.66%
Liberal	Trevor Butts	3,232	28.53%	-9.29%
Social Credit	Dale Glasier	1,177	10.39%	5.91%
New Democratic	George Peterson	1,065	9.40%	-9.28%
Total		11,327	–	–
Rejected, spoiled and declined		42	–	–
Eligible electors / turnout		23,868	47.63%	-8.41%
Progressive Conservative hold		Swing		10.97%
Source(s) Source: "Medicine Hat Official Results 1997 Alberta general election". Alberta Heritage Community Foundation.

=== 2001 ===
2001 Alberta general election
Party	Candidate	Votes	%	±%
Progressive Conservative	Rob Renner	8,109	62.08%	10.41%
Liberal	Karen Charlton	4,166	31.89%	3.36%
New Democratic	Luke Lacasse	787	6.03%	-3.38%
Total		13,062	–	–
Rejected, spoiled and declined		60	–	–
Eligible electors / turnout		25,360	51.74%	4.11%
Progressive Conservative hold		Swing		3.52%
Source(s) Source: "Medicine Hat Official Results 2001 Alberta general election" (PDF). Elections Alberta.

=== 2004 ===
2004 Alberta general election
Party	Candidate	Votes	%	±%
Progressive Conservative	Rob Renner	5,261	49.97%	-12.11%
Liberal	Karen Charlton	3,419	32.47%	0.58%
Alberta Alliance	Scott Cowan	1,060	10.07%	–
New Democratic	Diana Arnott	547	5.20%	-0.83%
Social Credit	Jonathan Lorentzen	242	2.30%	–
Total		10,529	–	–
Rejected, spoiled and declined		81	–	–
Eligible electors / turnout		25,746	41.21%	-10.53%
Progressive Conservative hold		Swing		-6.35%
Source(s) Source: "Medicine Hat Statement of Official Results 2004 Alberta general election" (PDF). Elections Alberta.

=== 2008 ===
2008 Alberta general election
Party	Candidate	Votes	%	±%
Progressive Conservative	Rob Renner	5,388	51.18%	1.21%
Liberal	Karen Charlton	3,625	34.43%	1.96%
Wildrose Alliance	Clint Rabb	746	7.09%	-2.99%
New Democratic	Diana Arnott	484	4.60%	-0.60%
Green	Karen Kraus	285	2.71%	–
Total		10,528	–	–
Rejected, spoiled and declined		51	–	–
Eligible electors / turnout		29,877	35.41%	-5.80%
Progressive Conservative hold		Swing		-0.37%
Source(s) Source: The Report on the March 3, 2008 Provincial General Election of the Twenty-seventh Legislative Assembly. Elections Alberta. July 28, 2008. pp. 492–495.

=== 2012 ===
2012 Alberta general election
Party	Candidate	Votes	%	±%
Wildrose	Blake Pedersen	6,034	43.56%	36.47%
Progressive Conservative	Darren Hirsch	5,342	38.56%	-12.62%
New Democratic	Dennis Perrier	1,168	8.43%	3.83%
Liberal	Matthew B. Sandford	1,095	7.90%	-26.53%
Evergreen	Graham Murray	214	1.54%	-1.17%
Total		13,853	–	–
Rejected, spoiled, and declined		114	–	–
Eligible electors / turnout		29,058	48.07%	12.66%
Wildrose gain from Progressive Conservative		Swing		-5.88%
Source(s) Source: "72 - Medicine Hat Official Results 2012 Alberta general election". officialresults.elections.ab.ca. Elections Alberta.

=== 2015 ===
2015 Alberta general election
Party	Candidate	Votes	%	±%
New Democratic	Bob Wanner	6,160	37.92%	29.49%
Wildrose	Val Olson	5,790	35.64%	-7.92%
Progressive Conservative	Blake Pedersen	3,427	21.10%	-17.47%
Alberta Party	Jim Black	731	4.50%	–
Independent	David Andrew Phillips	137	0.84%	–
Total		16,245	–	–
Rejected, spoiled and declined		57	–	–
Eligible electors / turnout		30,585	53.30%	5.23%
New Democratic gain from Wildrose		Swing		-1.36%
Source(s) Source: "72 - Medicine Hat Official Results 2015 Alberta general election". officialresults.elections.ab.ca. Elections Alberta.

== Senate nominee election results ==
=== 2004 ===
2004 Senate nominee election results: Medicine Hat				Turnout 41.25%	
Affiliation	Candidate	Votes	% votes	% ballots	Rank
Progressive Conservative	Betty Unger	3,427	15.30%	43.92%	2
Progressive Conservative	Bert Brown	3,420	15.27%	43.84%	1
Progressive Conservative	Cliff Breitkreuz	2,256	10.07%	28.92%	3
Progressive Conservative	David Usherwood	2,245	10.02%	28.78%	6
Independent	Link Byfield	2,230	9.96%	28.58%	4
Progressive Conservative	Jim Silye	2,215	9.89%	28.39%	5
Alberta Alliance	Michael Roth	1,972	8.80%	25.28%	7
Alberta Alliance	Vance Gough	1,780	7.95%	22.82%	8
Alberta Alliance	Gary Horan	1,607	7.17%	20.60%	10
Independent	Tom Sindlinger	1,249	5.57%	16.01%	9
Total votes		22,401	100%		
Total ballots		7,802	2.87 votes per ballot		
Rejected, spoiled and declined		2,819			

Voters had the option of selecting four candidates on the ballot

== Plebiscite results ==
=== 1948 electrification lebiscite ===
District results from the first province wide plebiscite on electricity regulation.

Option A	Option B
Are you in favour of the generation and distribution of electricity being continued by the Power Companies?	Are you in favour of the generation and distribution of electricity being made a publicly owned utility administered by the Alberta Government Power Commission?
5,168 81.03%	1,214 18.97%
Province wide result: Option A passed.

=== 1957 liquor plebiscite ===
1957 Alberta liquor plebiscite results: Medicine Hat
Question A: Do you approve additional types of outlets for the sale of beer, wine and spirituous liquor subject to a local vote?
Ballot choice	Votes	%
Yes	2,728	50.04%
No	2,724	49.96%
Total votes	5,452	100%
Rejected, spoiled and declined	98	
12,586 eligible electors, turnout 44.10%

On October 30, 1957, a stand-alone plebiscite was held province wide in all 50 of the then current provincial electoral districts in Alberta. The government decided to consult Alberta voters to decide on liquor sales and mixed drinking after a divisive debate in the Legislature. The plebiscite was intended to deal with the growing demand for reforming antiquated liquor control laws.

The plebiscite was conducted in two parts. Question A asked in all districts, asked the voters if the sale of liquor should be expanded in Alberta, while Question B asked in a handful of districts within the corporate limits of Calgary and Edmonton asked if men and woman were allowed to drink together in establishments.

Province wide Question A of the plebiscite passed in 33 of the 50 districts while Question B passed in all five districts. Medicine Hat just barely voted in favour of the proposal with the difference between Yes and No being four votes. Voter turnout in the district was slightly below the province wide average of 46%.

Official district returns were released to the public on December 31, 1957. The Social Credit government in power at the time did not considered the results binding. However the results of the vote led the government to repeal all existing liquor legislation and introduce an entirely new Liquor Act.

Municipal districts lying inside electoral districts that voted against the Plebiscite were designated Local Option Zones by the Alberta Liquor Control Board and considered effective dry zones, business owners that wanted a license had to petition for a binding municipal plebiscite in order to be granted a license.

== Student vote results ==
=== 2004 ===
Participating schools
Crescent Heights High School
Crestwood Elementary School
McCoy High School
Medicine Hat High School
River Heights Elementary
Southview School

On November 19, 2004, a student vote was conducted at participating Alberta schools to parallel the 2004 Alberta general election results. The vote was designed to educate students and simulate the electoral process for persons who have not yet reached the legal majority. The vote was conducted in 80 of the 83 provincial electoral districts with students voting for actual election candidates. Schools with a large student body that reside in another electoral district had the option to vote for candidates outside of the electoral district then where they were physically located.

2004 Alberta student vote results
Affiliation	Candidate	Votes	%
Progressive Conservative	Rob Renner	586	42.71%
Liberal	Karen Charlton	361	26.31%
NDP	Diana Arnott	209	15.23%
Alberta Alliance	Scott Cowan	109	7.94%
Social Credit	Jonathan Lorentzen	107	7.81%
Total		1,372	100%
Rejected, spoiled and declined		25	

== See also ==
- List of Alberta provincial electoral districts
- Canadian provincial electoral districts
- Medicine Hat (federal electoral district), a federal electoral district since 1908
