= Medicine Hat-Redcliff =

Defunct provincial electoral district in Alberta, Canada

Alberta electoral district

Defunct provincial electoral district
- Legislature: Legislative Assembly of Alberta
- District created: 1971
- District abolished: 1979
- First contested: 1971
- Last contested: 1975

Medicine Hat-Redcliff was a provincial electoral district in Alberta, Canada, mandated to return a single member to the Legislative Assembly of Alberta using the first past the post method of voting from 1971 to 1979.

== History ==
Members of the Legislative Assembly for Medicine Hat-Redcliff
Assembly	Years	Member	Party
See Medicine Hat electoral district from 1905-1971
17th	1971–1975	William Wyse	Social Credit
18th	1975–1979	Jim Horsman	Progressive Conservative
See Medicine Hat electoral district from 1979-2019 and Cypress-Medicine Hat electoral district from 1979-Present

The Medicine Hat-Redcliff electoral district was named after the city of Medicine Hat and the town of Redcliff.

The electoral district was created in the 1971 re-distribution absorbing the district of Medicine Hat, and was abolished in the 1979 re-distribution splitting into Cypress-Medicine Hat and Medicine Hat electoral districts.

=== Representatives ===
The district was represented in the Legislative Assembly of Alberta by William Wyse in the 17th Alberta Legislative Assembly from 1971 to 1975, and Jim Horsman in the 18th Alberta Legislative Assembly from 1975 to 1979.

== Legislative electoral history ==
=== 1971 ===
1971 Alberta general election
Party	Candidate	Votes	%	±%
Social Credit	William Wyse	6,447	48.93%	–
Progressive Conservative	Jim Horsman	4,140	31.42%	–
New Democratic	Frank Armstrong	2,128	16.15%	–
Liberal	Theodore Anhorn	462	3.51%	–
Total		13,177	–	–
Rejected, spoiled and declined		67	–	–
Eligible electors / Turnout		17,903	73.98%	–
Social Credit pickup new district.				
Source(s) Source: "Medicine Hat-Redcliff Official Results 1971 Alberta general election". Alberta Heritage Community Foundation.

=== 1975 ===
1975 Alberta general election
Party	Candidate	Votes	%	±%
Progressive Conservative	Jim Horsman	5,678	46.43%	15.02%
Social Credit	William Wyse	5,548	45.37%	-3.55%
Liberal	David Wilkins	532	4.35%	0.84%
New Democratic	Bill Hartley	417	3.41%	-12.74%
Independent Progressive Conservative	Hilory Sorschan	53	0.43%	–
Total		12,228	–	–
Rejected, spoiled and declined		27	–	–
Eligible electors / turnout		20,279	60.43%	-13.54%
Progressive Conservative gain from Social Credit		Swing		-8.22%
Source(s) Source: "Medicine Hat-Redcliff Official Results 1975 Alberta general election". Alberta Heritage Community Foundation.

== See also ==
- List of Alberta provincial electoral districts
- Canadian provincial electoral districts
