= Elizabeth G. Robinson =

Canadian politician

Elizabeth Gladys Robinson

Member of the Legislative Assembly of Alberta
- In office December 19, 1953 – October 21, 1960
- Preceded by: John Robinson
- Succeeded by: Harry Leinweber
- Constituency: Medicine Hat

Personal details
- Born: May 28, 1899
- Died: October 21, 1960 (aged 61) Medicine Hat, Alberta
- Party: Social Credit
- Spouse: John Robinson

Elizabeth Gladys Robinson (May 28, 1899 – October 21, 1960) was a provincial politician from Alberta, Canada. Following the death of her husband SC MLA John Lyle Robinson, she served as a Social Credit member of the Legislative Assembly of Alberta from 1953 until her death in 1960, representing Medicine Hat.

== Political career ==
Robinson ran in a provincial by-election in the Medicine Hat electoral district on December 19, 1953, after her husband John Lyle Robinson died on October 29, 1953. John Robinson was a SC cabinet minister and MLA for the Medicine Hat district.

Elizabeth Robinson won the 1953 by-election by a wide margin with almost 77% of the vote in a straight fight over E.W. Horne running under the Co-operative Commonwealth banner. The by-election was very low turnout, the lowest to date in the Medicine Hat district with just 28% of the voters casting a ballot.

Robinson ran for a second term in the 1955 Alberta general election. She won a large but reduced majority defeating two other candidates to hold her seat.

Robinson ran for her third and final term in the 1959 Alberta general election. She won the highest popular vote of her career despite her margin of victory dropping slightly. She held the district against three other candidates.

Robinson, like her husband, died while holding office. She was hospitalized in Medicine Hat's University Hospital on August 31, 1960, after her illness worsened. She died on October 21, 1960, from the illness, which medical staff refused to disclose.
