= Bob Wanner =

Canadian politician

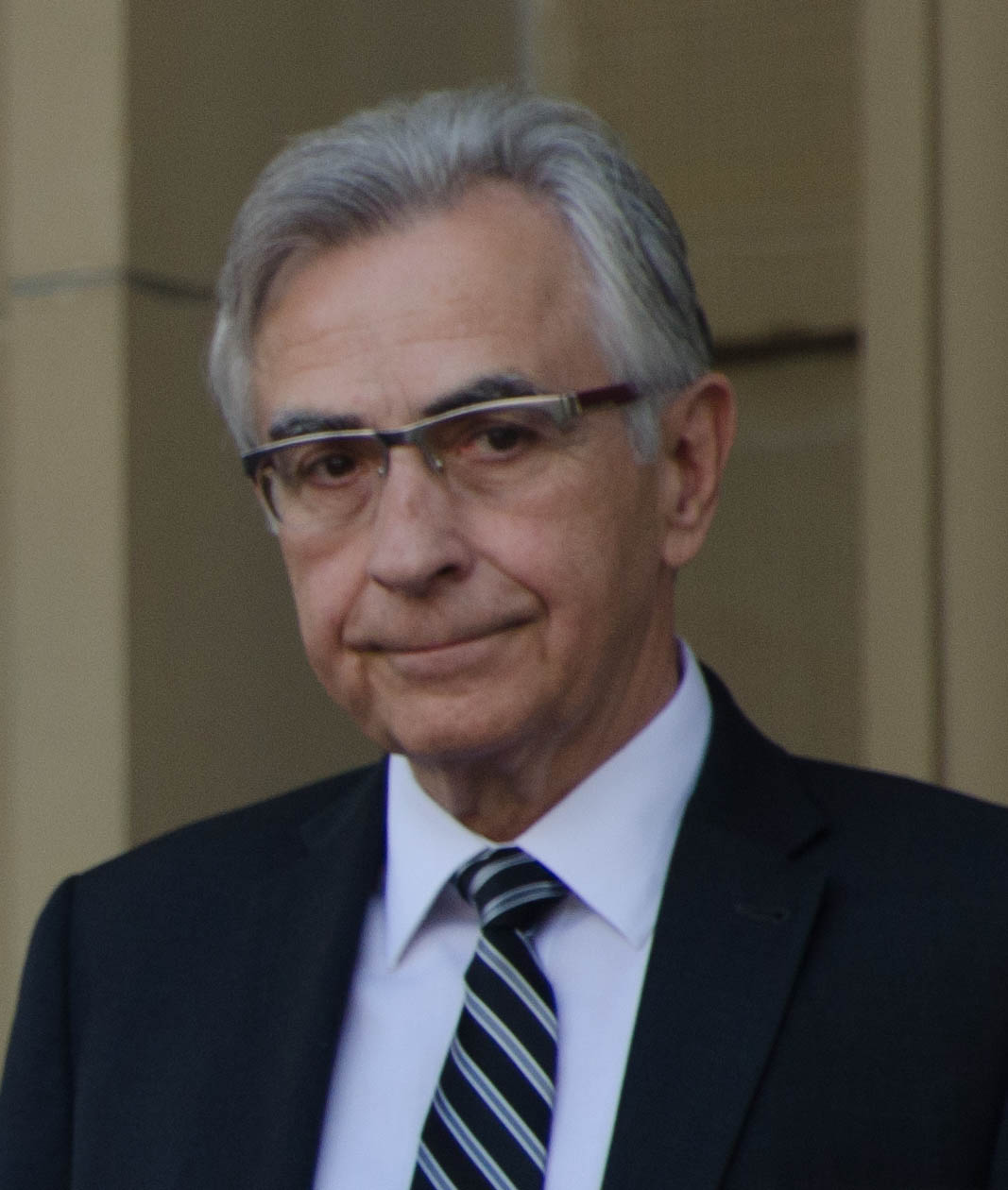
- Wanner in 2015

13th Speaker of the Alberta Legislative Assembly
- In office June 11, 2015 – May 20, 2019
- Preceded by: Gene Zwozdesky
- Succeeded by: Nathan Cooper

Member of the Legislative Assembly of Alberta for Medicine Hat
- In office May 5, 2015 – April 15, 2019
- Preceded by: Blake Pedersen
- Succeeded by: District abolished

Personal details
- Born: Robert Edward Wanner; April 25, 1949 (age 77) Weyburn, Saskatchewan, Canada
- Party: New Democratic
- Occupation: Businessman, Former Public Services Commissioner for the City of Medicine Hat

Robert Edward Wanner (born April 25, 1949) is a Canadian politician who was elected in the 2015 Alberta general election to the Legislative Assembly of Alberta representing the electoral district of Medicine Hat. On June 11, 2015, he was elected as Speaker of the Legislative Assembly of Alberta.

On April 18, 2016, Wanner threw interim PC leader Ric McIver out of the Alberta legislature for repeatedly refusing to sit down after learning that sheets explaining Wanner's ruling for an NDP amendment on a motion tabled by McIver had been distributed before the amendment was even debated on the floor.

Wanner did not seek re-election in the 2019 general election.

Wanner endorsed Alberta MP Heather McPherson in the 2026 New Democratic Party leadership election.

== Electoral history ==
=== 2015 general election ===
2015 Alberta general election: Medicine Hat
Party	Candidate	Votes	%	±%
New Democratic	Bob Wanner	6,160	37.92%	29.49%
Wildrose	Val Olson	5,790	35.64%	-7.92%
Progressive Conservative	Blake Pedersen	3,427	21.10%	-17.47%
Alberta Party	Jim Black	731	4.50%	–
Independent	David Andrew Phillips	137	0.84%	–
Total		16,245	–	–
Rejected, spoiled and declined		57	–	–
Eligible electors / turnout		30,585	53.30%	5.23%
New Democratic gain from Wildrose		Swing		-1.36%
Source(s) Source: "72 - Medicine Hat Official Results 2015 Alberta general election". officialresults.elections.ab.ca. Elections Alberta.
