= William Wyse (politician) =

Canadian politician

William "Bill" Russell Wyse

Member of the Legislative Assembly of Alberta
- In office August 30, 1971 – March 25, 1975
- Preceded by: Harry Leinweber
- Succeeded by: Jim Horsman
- Constituency: Medicine Hat-Redcliff

Personal details
- Born: January 15, 1934 (age 92) Castor, Alberta
- Party: Social Credit

William Russell Wyse (born January 15, 1934) is a former politician from Alberta, Canada. He served in the Legislative Assembly of Alberta from 1971 to 1975 as a member of the Social Credit Party.

Wyse first ran for a seat to the Alberta Legislature in the 1971 general election, as the Social Credit candidate in the electoral district of Medicine Hat-Redcliff. He defeated Progressive Conservative candidate Jim Horsman and two other candidates. Wyse and Horsman faced each other again in the 1975 election; Horsman defeated Wyse by over 100 votes.
