= John Lyle Robinson =

Canadian politician

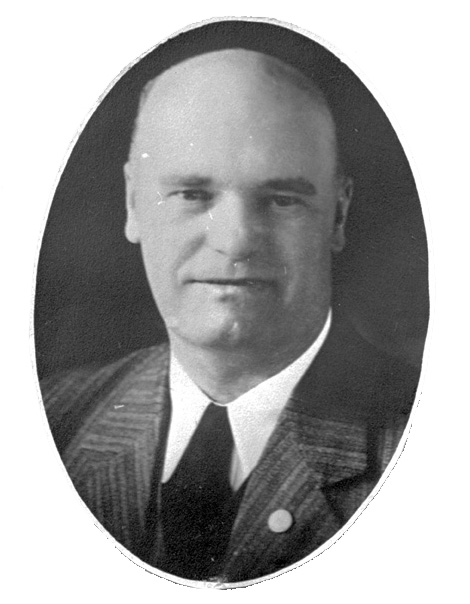

Member of the Legislative Assembly of Alberta
- In office August 22, 1935 – October 29, 1953
- Preceded by: Hector Lang
- Succeeded by: Elizabeth Robinson
- Constituency: Medicine Hat

Minister of Industries and Labour
- In office May 8, 1948 – 1953
- Preceded by: Clarence Gerhart
- Succeeded by: Norman Willmore

Personal details
- Born: August 28, 1890 Belfast, Ireland
- Died: October 29, 1953 (aged 63)
- Party: Social Credit Party of Alberta
- Spouse: Elizabeth Robinson
- Occupation: Chiropractor

John Lyle Robinson (August 28, 1890 – October 29, 1953) was a Canadian politician who served as a member of the Legislative Assembly of Alberta from 1935 until his death in 1953 sitting with the Social Credit caucus. He served in the government of Ernest Manning as Minister of Industries and Labour from 1948 until 1953.

== Political career ==
A chiropractor, Robinson was first elected to the legislature in the 1935 provincial election as a candidate of William Aberhart's Social Credit League; he was re-elected in the 1940, 1944, 1948, and 1952 elections.

In March 1938, during a debate on a workman's compensation act, Robinson took the position that he would support a committee's recommendation that chiropractic services not be covered by the act, up to and until the point at which somebody moved an amendment to include them, in which case he would support the amendment. He was subsequently reported in the Edmonton Journal by legislative reporter Don Brown as being opposed to the inclusion of chiropractic services in the act. Robinson angrily insisted that he had been misquoted, and his fellow Social Crediters, who had a poor relationship with the news media (see Accurate News and Information Act) passed a resolution that Brown be jailed "during the pleasure of the assembly". Brown was never actually jailed, and a resolution the next day ordered "the release of Mr. Don C. Brown from custody".

In 1948, Premier of Alberta Ernest Manning appointed Robinson Minister of Industries and Labour effective May 8.

Robinson died on October 29, 1953, while still in office; his wife Elizabeth won his seat in a by-election held on December 21.
