= Blake Pedersen =

Canadian politician (born 1965)

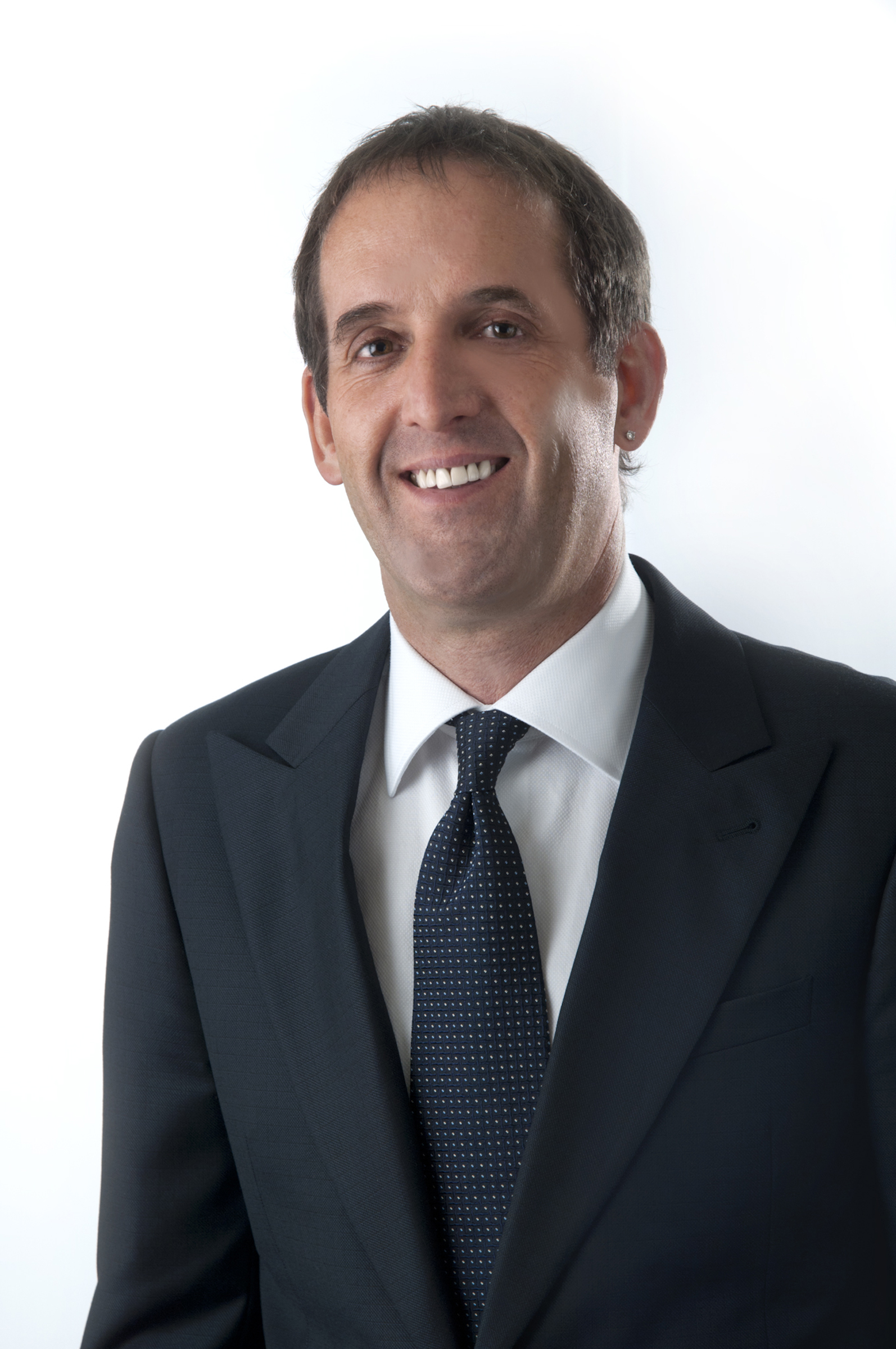

MLA for Medicine Hat
- In office April 23, 2012 – May 5, 2015
- Preceded by: Rob Renner
- Succeeded by: Bob Wanner

Personal details
- Born: February 9, 1965 (age 61) Gull Lake, Saskatchewan
- Party: Alberta Party (2017-present)
- Other political affiliations: Wildrose (2012–2014); Progressive Conservative (2014-2017)
- Occupation: small business owner
- Website: blakepedersen.ca

Blake James Pedersen (born February 9, 1965) is a Canadian politician who was an elected member to the Legislative Assembly of Alberta, previously representing the electoral district of Medicine Hat. He was born at Gull Lake, Saskatchewan.

He was first elected in the 2012 provincial election as a member of the Wildrose Party caucus.

In the spring 2013 sitting of the Alberta Legislature, Pedersen put forward Motion 510 to restore a competitive tax credit system for film industry labour costs, which was supported by the Progressive Conservatives, NDP and Liberals. Motion 510 was the first Wildrose motion to ever pass in the Alberta Legislature. The proposal in Pedersen's motion would replace the current system of awarding grants to film companies through the Alberta Multimedia Development Fund with a tax credit that would enable all companies to recoup a portion of their production costs.

Pedersen was born and raised in Gull Lake, Saskatchewan, on the family ranch. Following graduation from Gull Lake High School, he moved to Vancouver as a drummer with a band, but returned to Gull Lake a few months later and entered the work force with a local oilfield services company. Experiencing his first of many boom and bust cycles, after one year of employment Pedersen participated in a 10-month agricultural exchange program to Australia with the International Agricultural Exchange Association. Upon his return to Canada, Pedersen returned to the oilfield services industry, and in 1999 became a small business owner.

On December 17, 2014, he was one of nine Wildrose MLAs who crossed the floor to join the Alberta Progressive Conservative caucus. Pederson stood for reelection during the 2015 Alberta election but was defeated by NDP's Bob Wanner, finishing third.

In November 2017, it was reported that Pedersen had since joined the Alberta Party, and was seeking a seat on the party's board of directors.

== Electoral history ==
2012 Alberta general election: Medicine Hat
| Party | Candidate | Votes | % | ±% |
|---|---|---|---|---|
| Wildrose | Blake Pedersen | 6,034 | 43.56% | 36.47% |
| Progressive Conservative | Darren Hirsch | 5,342 | 38.56% | -12.62% |
| New Democratic | Dennis Perrier | 1,168 | 8.43% | 3.83% |
| Liberal | Matthew B. Sandford | 1,095 | 7.90% | -26.53% |
| Evergreen | Graham Murray | 214 | 1.54% | -1.17% |
| Total | | 13,853 | – | – |
| Rejected, spoiled, and declined | | 114 | – | – |
| Eligible electors / turnout | | 29,058 | 48.07% | 12.66% |
| Wildrose gain from Progressive Conservative | | Swing | | -5.88% |
Source(s) Source: "72 - Medicine Hat Official Results 2012 Alberta general election". officialresults.elections.ab.ca. Elections Alberta.

2015 Alberta general election: Medicine Hat
| Party | Candidate | Votes | % | ±% |
|---|---|---|---|---|
| New Democratic | Bob Wanner | 6,160 | 37.92% | 29.49% |
| Wildrose | Val Olson | 5,790 | 35.64% | -7.92% |
| Progressive Conservative | Blake Pedersen | 3,427 | 21.10% | -17.47% |
| Alberta Party | Jim Black | 731 | 4.50% | – |
| Independent | David Andrew Phillips | 137 | 0.84% | – |
| Total | | 16,245 | – | – |
| Rejected, spoiled and declined | | 57 | – | – |
| Eligible electors / turnout | | 30,585 | 53.30% | 5.23% |
| New Democratic gain from Wildrose | | Swing | | -1.36% |
Source(s) Source: "72 - Medicine Hat Official Results 2015 Alberta general election". officialresults.elections.ab.ca. Elections Alberta.
