= Rob Renner =

Canadian politician (born 1954)

The Honourable Rob Renner ECA

MLA for Medicine Hat
- In office 1993–2012
- Preceded by: Jim Horsman
- Succeeded by: Blake Pedersen

Minister of the Environment in the Alberta government
- In office 15 December 2006 – 12 October 2011
- Preceded by: Guy Boutilier
- Succeeded by: Diana McQueen

Minister of Municipal Affairs in the Alberta government
- In office 25 November 2004 – 15 December 2006
- Preceded by: Guy Boutilier
- Succeeded by: Ray Danyluk

Personal details
- Born: 6 October 1954 (age 71) Medicine Hat, Alberta, Canada
- Party: Progressive Conservative
- Education: University of Calgary
- Website: www.robrenner.ca

Robert William Renner ECA (born 6 October 1954) is a Canadian politician and was a Member of the Legislative Assembly of Alberta for the constituency of Medicine Hat as a Progressive Conservative.

== Early life ==
Renner was born 6 October 1954, in Medicine Hat, Alberta. He graduated from the University of Calgary in 1976 with a Bachelor of Commerce. Before entering provincial politics, Renner owned and operated a family florist business in Medicine Hat.

== Political career ==
Renner was first elected in the 1993 Alberta general election. During his political tenure, Renner has served in numerous capacities; including, member of Treasury Board, Chief Government Caucus Whip, president of the Pacific Northwest Economic Region, chair of the Health Professions Act Implementation Steering Committee, and co-chair of the Automobile Insurance Implementation Team.

Renner was Minister of Alberta Municipal Affairs from 2004 to 2006, during this time he ordered the inspection of the 2004 Calgary municipal election results in Ward 10 on allegations of electoral fraud.

On 13 March 2008, Renner was sworn into his second term as Minister of Alberta Environment, a position that he has held since 15 December 2006. Renner also serves as Deputy Government House Leader, vice-chair of the Cabinet Policy Committee on Resources and the Environment, and as a member of the Agenda and Priorities Committee.

Since becoming Minister of Alberta Environment, Renner has overseen the development of Alberta's 2008 Climate Change Strategy, released in January 2008. During the Spring 2007 Legislature session, Renner led Bill 3 - The Climate Change and Emissions Management Amendment Act, 2007 - creating the first-ever legislated greenhouse gas emission reduction targets in North America. Renner has also renewed Water for Life, Alberta's water management framework, and he continues to develop the cumulative effects environmental management system.

== Personal life ==
Renner helped champion improvements to the historic downtown Medicine Hat streetscape and is a former president of the Downtown Business Association. He held the position of Director of the Medicine Hat Chamber of Commerce and was a member of Medicine Hat's Rotary, Freemasonry and Jaycee Clubs.

== Election results ==
1993 Alberta general election: Medicine Hat
Party	Candidate	Votes	%	±%
Progressive Conservative	Rob Renner	4,941	39.01%	-1.99%
Liberal	Garth Vallely	4,790	37.82%	4.76%
New Democratic	Bob Wanner	2,366	18.68%	-7.25%
Social Credit	Marcel Guay	568	4.48%	–
Total		12,665	–	–
Rejected, spoiled and declined		38	–	–
Eligible electors / turnout		22,665	56.05%	2.60%
Progressive Conservative hold		Swing		-3.37%
Source(s) Source: "Medicine Hat Official Results 1993 Alberta general election". Alberta Heritage Community Foundation.

1997 Alberta general election: Medicine Hat
Party	Candidate	Votes	%	±%
Progressive Conservative	Rob Renner	5,853	51.67%	12.66%
Liberal	Trevor Butts	3,232	28.53%	-9.29%
Social Credit	Dale Glasier	1,177	10.39%	5.91%
New Democratic	George Peterson	1,065	9.40%	-9.28%
Total		11,327	–	–
Rejected, spoiled and declined		42	–	–
Eligible electors / turnout		23,868	47.63%	-8.41%
Progressive Conservative hold		Swing		10.97%
Source(s) Source: "Medicine Hat Official Results 1997 Alberta general election". Alberta Heritage Community Foundation.

2001 Alberta general election: Medicine Hat
Party	Candidate	Votes	%	±%
Progressive Conservative	Rob Renner	8,109	62.08%	10.41%
Liberal	Karen Charlton	4,166	31.89%	3.36%
New Democratic	Luke Lacasse	787	6.03%	-3.38%
Total		13,062	–	–
Rejected, spoiled and declined		60	–	–
Eligible electors / turnout		25,360	51.74%	4.11%
Progressive Conservative hold		Swing		3.52%
Source(s) Source: "Medicine Hat Official Results 2001 Alberta general election" (PDF). Elections Alberta.

2004 Alberta general election: Medicine Hat
Party	Candidate	Votes	%	±%
Progressive Conservative	Rob Renner	5,261	49.97%	-12.11%
Liberal	Karen Charlton	3,419	32.47%	0.58%
Alberta Alliance	Scott Cowan	1,060	10.07%	–
New Democratic	Diana Arnott	547	5.20%	-0.83%
Social Credit	Jonathan Lorentzen	242	2.30%	–
Total		10,529	–	–
Rejected, spoiled and declined		81	–	–
Eligible electors / turnout		25,746	41.21%	-10.53%
Progressive Conservative hold		Swing		-6.35%
Source(s) Source: "Medicine Hat Statement of Official Results 2004 Alberta general election" (PDF). Elections Alberta.

2008 Alberta general election: Medicine Hat
Party	Candidate	Votes	%	±%
Progressive Conservative	Rob Renner	5,388	51.18%	1.21%
Liberal	Karen Charlton	3,625	34.43%	1.96%
Wildrose Alliance	Clint Rabb	746	7.09%	-2.99%
New Democratic	Diana Arnott	484	4.60%	-0.60%
Green	Karen Kraus	285	2.71%	–
Total		10,528	–	–
Rejected, spoiled and declined		51	–	–
Eligible electors / turnout		29,877	35.41%	-5.80%
Progressive Conservative hold		Swing		-0.37%
Source(s) Source: The Report on the March 3, 2008 Provincial General Election of the Twenty-seventh Legislative Assembly. Elections Alberta. 28 July 2008. pp. 492–495.
