= Barrhead-Westlock =

Defunct provincial electoral district in Alberta, Canada

Alberta electoral district

Defunct provincial electoral district
- Legislature: Legislative Assembly of Alberta
- District created: 1993
- District abolished: 2004
- First contested: 1993
- Last contested: 2001

Barrhead-Westlock was a provincial electoral district in Alberta, Canada, mandated to return a single member to the Legislative Assembly of Alberta using the first-past-the-post method of voting from 1993 to 2004.

== History ==
=== Boundary history ===
Barrhead-Westlock was created from Barrhead, Westlock-Sturgeon and a small portion of Athabasca-Lac La Biche in 1993. Its largest communities were its namesake towns Barrhead and Westlock, as well as the town of Swan Hills. Its boundaries remained unchanged in the redistribution that took effect in 1997.

The riding was replaced by Barrhead-Morinville-Westlock in the 2003 electoral boundary re-distribution, which covered the entire area of Barrhead-Westlock and a small portion of Redwater.

=== Representation history ===
Members of the Legislative Assembly for Barrhead-Westlock
Assembly	Years	Member	Party
See Barrhead 1971-1993 and Westlock-Sturgeon 1986-1993.
23rd	1993-1997	Ken Kowalski	Progressive; Conservative
24th	1997-2001	Ken Kowalski	Progressive; Conservative
25th	2001-2004	Ken Kowalski	Progressive; Conservative
See Barrhead-Morinville-Westlock electoral district from 2004-2019

Barrhead-Westlock's only MLA was Ken Kowalski, who had already served as the Progressive Conservative member for Barrhead since 1979.

After the 1997 election, Kowalski became the 11th Speaker of the Legislative Assembly.

When Barrhead-Westlock was abolished for the 2004 election, Kowalski continued his political career, serving two more terms in the new riding of Barrhead-Morinville-Westlock as MLA and Speaker of the Assembly.

== Election results ==
=== 1993 ===
1993 Alberta general election
Party	Candidate	Votes	%	±%
Progressive Conservative	Ken Kowalski	6,312	55.04%	–
Liberal	Dale Greig	3,309	28.85%	–
New Democratic	Harold Wharton	1,076	9.38%	–
Social Credit	Dale Harris	561	4.89%	–
Confederation of Regions	Adam Hauch	143	1.25%	–
Independent	Leonard Stahl	79	0.58%	–
Total valid votes		11,468	–	–
Rejected, spoiled and declined		25	–	–
Registered electors / turnout		16,439	69.91%	–
Progressive Conservative pickup new district.				
Source(s) Source: "Barrhead-Westlock Official Results 1993 Alberta general election". Alberta Heritage Community Foundation.

=== 1997 ===
1997 Alberta general election
Party	Candidate	Votes	%	±%
Progressive Conservative	Ken Kowalski	6,195	60.66%	+5.62%
Liberal	Dale Greig	2,130	20.86%	-7.99%
Social Credit	J. Harvey Yuill	1,244	12.18%	+7.29%
New Democratic	Joe Woytowich	643	6.30%	-3.08%
Total valid votes		10,212	–	–
Rejected, spoiled and declined		29	–	–
Registered electors / turnout		16,778	61.04%	-8.87%
Progressive Conservative hold		Swing		+6.81%
Source(s) Source: "Barrhead-Westlock Official Results 1997 Alberta general election". Alberta Heritage Community Foundation.

=== 2001 ===
2001 Alberta general election
Party	Candidate	Votes	%	±%
Progressive Conservative	Ken Kowalski	7,183	69.31%	+8.65%
Social Credit	Jeff Willerton	1,352	13.05%	+0.87%
Liberal	Laurie Hodge	1,259	12.15%	-8.71%
New Democratic	Suzanne Forbes	569	5.49%	-0.81%
Total valid votes		10,401	–	–
Rejected, spoiled and declined		38	–	–
Registered electors / turnout		16,794	61.93%	+0.89%
Progressive Conservative hold		Swing		+3.89%
Source(s) Source: "Barrhead-Westlock Official Results 2001 Alberta general election". Alberta Heritage Community Foundation.

== See also ==
- List of Alberta provincial electoral districts
- Canadian provincial electoral districts
