= Westlock (disambiguation) =

Westlock is a town in Alberta, Canada.

Westlock may also refer to the following entities in Alberta, Canada:

- Westlock (Hnatko Farms) Aerodrome
- Westlock Airport
- Westlock County, a municipal district
- Westlock—St. Paul, a former federal electoral district
- Westlock-Sturgeon, a former federal electoral district
- Barrhead-Morinville-Westlock, a provincial electoral district

== See also ==
- West Lockinge
