= Alberta Distance Learning Centre =

Location
- Barrhead, Alberta; Canada; 54.1371°N 114.3960°W (Barrhead campus)

Information
- Type: Public school specializing in online distance education
- Established: 1923-2021
- Superintendent: David Garbutt
- Enrollment: 57,724
- Campus: Online, Barrhead
- Nickname: ADLC
- Website: adlc.ca

Alberta Distance Learning Centre (ADLC) was an educational organization that provided distance and distributed education services to primary and secondary students. It was based out of Barrhead, Alberta, Canada. ADLC ceased operation following the 2020–21 school year after it was defunded by the provincial government.

== Origins ==
The Alberta Distance Learning Centre (ADLC) was established by the Alberta government in 1923 as the Correspondence School Branch of Alberta's Department of Education.

=== Correspondence School Branch of Alberta's Department of Education ===
In 1921, the Government of Alberta pledged to overcome the obstacles to education in the province's rural and remote areas. Education minister Perren Baker directed the Alberta Department of Education to begin distributing lessons by mail to students in isolated rural communities.

In 1923, the provincial Department of Education established the Alberta Correspondence School Branch. The goal of the school was to provide education to children in remote areas of the province, housebound individuals, and adults interested in pursuing education. Elizabeth Sievwright served as Correspondence School Director from 1923 to 1930.

During the first two months, correspondence service was available and lessons were sent to 100 families across Alberta. Within five years, the service expanded to include more than 1,000 students in grades 1 though 8. As enrollment increased, the Correspondence Branch moved, first in 1937 to Edmonton's Terrace Building, and eight years later to an office on Stony Plain Road, Edmonton. In 1939, the Correspondence Branch began offering education for grades 9–12.

When the Second World War created a teacher shortage in Alberta, the Correspondence Branch turned to radio instruction. In 1940, the first lessons were broadcast on the CKUA Radio Network — the University of Alberta's radio station As the demand for high school services surpassed those for elementary and junior high programs, the Branch worked with the province-owned public educational television station, ACCESS TV (currently CTV Two Alberta), to begin televised instruction in the early 1970s.

=== Alberta Correspondence School (ACS) ===
In 1973, as part of its 60th anniversary, the Alberta Correspondence School Branch was officially designated the Alberta Correspondence School (ACS) by the province.

On October 27, 1980, the education minister announced that the school would be moving to the town of Barrhead, Alberta. In preparation for the move, the province commissioned the construction of a new building, situated in the north industrial area of Barrhead. ACS opened its new doors in September 1983.

=== Alberta Distance Learning Centre (ADLC) ===
In 1991, ACS was renamed Alberta Distance Learning Centre (ADLC). The name change was meant to reflect the shift from print-based correspondence education to distance learning using both print and non-print media.

=== Association with Pembina Hills ===
In 1996, the Alberta Distance Learning Centre joined Pembina Hills Regional Division No. 7's Vista Virtual School to create the ADLC Online School. In 1997, ADLC was divested to the Pembina Hills Regional Division.

ADLC continued to share a building with Alberta Education, who retained control over the development and design components of the operation. In 1998, ADLC opened a Calgary office. In 1999, Distance Learning Options South (DLOS) joined the ADLC and in 2006 it was officially by ADLC.

=== Learning Network ===
In 2014, Alberta Distance Learning Centre launched the ADLC Learning Network (LN). LN has two components: Teacher Support (TS) and Student Instruction (SI). Teacher Support provides instructors with customizable resources, including sample lesson plans that can be used to deliver various courses to students. The Student Instruction component features courses directly taught by ADLC teachers. SI courses still require a school facilitator to register students and manage the enrollment.

=== School closure ===
In August 2020, the Alberta Distance Learning Centre (ADLC) announced that its education programming would cease following the completion of the 2020–2021 school year.

== Education delivery models ==
ADLC was centered around the concept of distributed learning. Distributed learning is an instructional model that allows instructor, students, and content to be located in different, noncentralized locations so that instruction and learning can occur independently of time and place. The distributed learning model can be used in combination with traditional classroom-based courses and traditional distance education courses, or it can be used to create entirely virtual classrooms.

ADLC offered the following education delivery models in an asynchronous learning environment:

- Print: Print service is for students preferring printed materials, or lacking internet access. Access to teachers is provided online, over-the-phone, or in-person. There is usually one assignment booklet for each module booklet, with around six to eight modules per course. Students are assigned a teacher and a marker for every course.
- Online: Online or e-learning is for students who prefer working on computers and the internet.
- Blended: Blended learning is a combination of print and online delivery modes in which a student learns at least in part through delivery of content and instruction via digital and online media with some element of student control over time, place, path, or pace.

== French immersion ==
Through a partnership with the Fédération des conseils francophones de l'Alberta, ADLC offered French Immersion programming for high school students. ADLC offered all core subjects, and several optional and CTS courses, in French.

== Campuses ==
- Barrhead

== Notable people ==
Notable alumni

- Frank Kozar, biology and genetics instructor at Grande Prairie Regional College
- Berthold Figur, Faculty of Graduate Studies and Research, Faculty of Education at the University of Alberta
- Brandon Baddock, hockey player (WHL)
