= Popil (surname) =

Popil is a surname. Notable people with the surname include:

- Ed Popil (born 1971), American drag queen known as Mrs. Kasha Davis
- James Popil (1909–1978), Canadian politician
