= Redwater-Andrew =

Defunct provincial electoral district in Alberta, Canada

Coordinates: 54.09°N 112.48°W

Alberta electoral district

Defunct provincial electoral district
- Legislature: Legislative Assembly of Alberta
- District created: 1971
- District abolished: 1993
- First contested: 1971
- Last contested: 1989

Redwater-Andrew was a provincial electoral district in Alberta, Canada, mandated to return a single member to the Legislative Assembly of Alberta using the first-past-the-post method of voting from 1971 to 1993.

== History ==
Members of the Legislative Assembly for Redwater-Andrew
Assembly	Years	Member	Party
See Redwater 1940-1971 and Willingdon-Two Hills 1963-1971
17th	1971–1975	George Topolnisky	Progressive; Conservative
18th	1975–1979	George Topolnisky	Progressive; Conservative
19th	1979–1982	George Topolnisky	Progressive; Conservative
20th	1982–1986	George Topolnisky	Progressive; Conservative
21st	1986–1989	Steve Zarusky	Progressive; Conservative
22nd	1989–1993	Steve Zarusky	Progressive; Conservative
See Redwater and Vegreville-Viking 1993-2004

=== Boundary history ===
Redwater-Andrew was created in 1971 from most of the Redwater district, including the communities of Redwater and Smoky Lake, and a part of Willingdon-Two Hills south of the North Saskatchewan River. In 1986 it gained a portion of Clover Bar, including Lamont, and lost some territory to Westlock-Sturgeon. In 1993 the bulk of its area was redistributed to Redwater and Vegreville-Viking, with smaller portions going to Lac La Biche-St. Paul and Clover Bar-Fort Saskatchewan.

=== Representation history ===
Despite two-term Social Credit MLA for Redwater Michael Senych running in the new constituency, it was picked up by Progressive Conservative George Topolnisky by a wide margin in the 1971 election, which saw his party sweep to power. Topolinsky held the seat for four terms, despite healthy challenges by the New Democrats. Michael Senych also attempted to re-take the seat twice, as an independent in 1982 and with the Representative Party in 1986.

When Topolinsky retired in 1986, Steve Zarusky held the seat for the PCs despite a strong NDP performance. He was re-elected in 1989, and the district was abolished at the end of his second term. He ran unsuccessfully in the re-constituted Redwater district.

== Election results ==
=== 1970s ===
1971 Alberta general election
Party	Candidate	Votes	%
Progressive Conservative	George Topolnisky	3,277	50.29%
Social Credit	Michael Senych	2,271	34.85%
New Democratic	Norman Flach	968	14.86%
Total valid votes		6,516	
Rejected, spoiled and declined		35	
Registered electors & turnout		8,920	73.44%
Progressive Conservative pickup new district.			

1975 Alberta general election
Party	Candidate	Votes	%	±%
Progressive Conservative	George Topolnisky	3,784	66.11%	+15.82%
New Democratic	Graham Crosbie	1,824	31.87%	+17.01%
Communist	Neil Stenberg	116	2.03%	
Total valid votes		5,724		
Rejected, spoiled and declined		44		
Registered electors & turnout		8,513	67.76%	-5.68%
Progressive Conservative hold		Swing		-0.60%

1979 Alberta general election
Party	Candidate	Votes	%	±%
Progressive Conservative	George Topolnisky	3,945	52.53%	-13.58%
New Democratic	Steve Leskiw	2,870	38.22%	+6.35%
Social Credit	Erwin Hannig	547	7.28%	
Liberal	Rudolph Pisesky	148	1.97%	
Total valid votes		7,510		
Rejected, spoiled and declined		32		
Registered electors & turnout		10,636	70.91%	+3.15%
Progressive Conservative hold		Swing		-9.97%

=== 1980s ===
1982 Alberta general election
Party	Candidate	Votes	%	±%
Progressive Conservative	George Topolnisky	4,438	51.07%	-1.46%
New Democratic	Steve Leskiw	2,507	28.85%	-9.37%
Western Canada Concept	Roger Pullishy	1,121	12.90%	
Independent	Michael Senych	467	5.37%	
Liberal	Lawrence McCallum	157	1.81%	-0.16%
Total valid votes		8,690		
Rejected, spoiled and declined		15		
Registered electors & turnout		11,599	75.05%	+4.14%
Progressive Conservative hold		Swing		+3.96%

1986 Alberta general election
Party	Candidate	Votes	%	±%
Progressive Conservative	Steve Zarusky	3,539	46.63%	-4.44%
New Democratic	Denis Bobocel	2,761	36.38%	+7.53%
Representative	Michael Senych	981	12.92%	
Liberal	Adrianus Kuiper	309	4.07%	+2.26%
Total valid votes		7,590		
Rejected, spoiled and declined		13		
Registered electors & turnout		12,820	59.31%	-15.74%
Progressive Conservative hold		Swing		-5.99%

1989 Alberta general election
Party	Candidate	Votes	%	±%
Progressive Conservative	Steve Zarusky	4,366	52.92%	+6.29%
New Democratic	Chris Ewasiuk	2,359	28.59%	-7.79%
Liberal	Dennis Holowaychuk	1,525	18.48%	+14.41%
Total valid votes		8,250		
Rejected, spoiled and declined		14		
Registered electors & turnout		12,493	66.15%	+6.84%
Progressive Conservative hold		Swing		+7.04%

== See also ==
- List of Alberta provincial electoral districts
- Canadian provincial electoral districts
