= Athabasca-Barrhead-Westlock =

Provincial electoral district in Alberta, Canada

Alberta electoral district
- Athabasca-Barrhead-Westlock within Alberta (2017 boundaries)

Provincial electoral district
- Legislature: Legislative Assembly of Alberta
MLA
Glenn van Dijken
United Conservative
- District created: 2017
- First contested: 2019
- Last contested: 2023

Demographics
- Population (2016): 46,920
- Area (km²): 23,699
- Pop. density (per km²): 2

Athabasca-Barrhead-Westlock is a current provincial electoral district in Alberta, Canada. The district is one of 87 districts mandated to return a single member (MLA) to the Legislative Assembly of Alberta using the first past the post method of voting. It was contested for the first time in the 2019 Alberta election.

== Geography ==
The district is located in northern Alberta, containing the communities of Swan Hills, Barrhead, Westlock, Athabasca, and Smoky Lake. It stretches east into part of St. Paul County. Major transportation routes include Alberta Highways 2, 18, 28, and 33 (Grizzly Trail).

== History ==
Members of the Legislative Assembly for Athabasca-Barrhead-Westlock
Assembly	Years	Member	Party
See Barrhead-Morinville-Westlock 2004-2019 and Athabasca-Sturgeon-Redwater 2012-2019
30th	2019–2023	Glenn van Dijken	United Conservative
31st	2023–Present	Glenn van Dijken	United Conservative

The district was created in 2017 when the Electoral Boundaries Commission recommended consolidating four electoral districts into three in northeastern Alberta, placing most of Barrhead-Morinville-Westlock and Athabasca-Sturgeon-Redwater, along with a small part of Lac La Biche-St. Paul-Two Hills, into the new district. The Commission recommended naming the district Athabasca-Barrhead, but the Assembly decided to retain Westlock in the name. In 2017, the Athabasca-Barrhead-Westlock electoral district had a population of 46,920, which was slightly above the provincial average of 46,803 for a provincial electoral district.

The district first elected United Conservative MLA Glenn van Dijken who had previously been elected to Barrhead-Morinville-Westlock as a Wildrose candidate in 2015. Glenn van Dijken defeated his next closest challenger NDP candidate, day home operator and former Smoky Lake councillor Therese Taschuck by over 12,000 votes.

== Electoral results ==
=== 2023 ===
2023 Alberta general election
Party	Candidate	Votes	%	±%
United Conservative	Glenn van Dijken	15,631	74.32	+5.81
New Democratic	Landen Tischer	5,401	25.68	+6.19
Total		21,032	99.21	–
Rejected and declined		167	0.79	
Turnout		21,199	60.08	
Eligible voters		35,286		
United Conservative hold		Swing		-0.19
Source(s) Source: Elections Alberta

=== 2019 ===
2019 Alberta general election
Party	Candidate	Votes	%	±%	Expenditures
United Conservative	Glenn van Dijken	16,822	68.51%	-0.66%	$41,428
New Democratic	Therese Taschuk	4,786	19.49%	-11.19%	$63,567
Alberta Party	Wayne Rufiange	2,232	9.09%	–	$3,538
Alberta Independence	Buster Malcolm	442	1.80%	–	$968
Independent	Brad Giroux	273	1.11%	–	$3,038
Total		24,555	–	–	
Rejected, spoiled and declined		72	53	16	
Eligible electors / turnout		34,049	72.53%	–	
United Conservative notional hold		Swing		N/A	
Source(s) Source: Elections Alberta Change is based on re-distributed results from the 2015 Alberta general election. Note: Expenses is the sum of "Election Expenses", "Other Expenses" and "Transfers Issued". The Elections Act limits "Election Expenses" to $50,000.

=== 2015 ===
Redistributed results, 2015 Alberta election
Party	Votes	%
Wildrose	8,676	40.67%
New Democratic	6,546	30.68%
Progressive Conservative	6,081	28.50%
Others	32	0.15%

== Nomination contests ==
UCP Athabasca-Barrhead-Westlock nomination contest: December 9-10, 2022

Candidate
Candidate	Votes	%
Glenn van Dijken	500	52.8
Isaac Skuban	447	47.2
Total	947	100.0

== See also ==
- List of Alberta provincial electoral districts
- Canadian provincial electoral districts
