= Barrhead (electoral district) =

Defunct provincial electoral district in Alberta, Canada

Alberta electoral district

Defunct provincial electoral district
- Legislature: Legislative Assembly of Alberta
- District created: 1971
- District abolished: 1993
- First contested: 1971
- Last contested: 1989

Barrhead was a provincial electoral district in Alberta, Canada, mandated to return a single member to the Legislative Assembly of Alberta using first-past-the-post balloting from 1971 to 1993.

== History ==
=== Boundary history ===
Barrhead replaced the district of Pembina in the redistribution that took effect in 1971, centred around the town of Barrhead. In 1979 its southern boundary was extended to the north shore of Lac Ste. Anne, and extended further south again in 1986.

In the redistribution that took effect in 1993, the riding was replaced by Barrhead-Westlock and its southern portion was transferred to Whitecourt-Ste. Anne.

=== Representation history ===
Members of the Legislative Assembly for Barrhead-Westlock
Assembly	Years	Member	Party
See Pembina 1909–1971
17th	1971–1975	Hugh Horner	Progressive; Conservative
18th	1975–1979	Hugh Horner	Progressive; Conservative
19th	1979	Hugh Horner	Progressive; Conservative
19th	1979	Vacant	
19th	1979–1982	Ken Kowalski	Progressive; Conservative
20th	1982–1986	Ken Kowalski	Progressive; Conservative
21st	1986–1989	Ken Kowalski	Progressive; Conservative
22nd	1989–1993	Ken Kowalski	Progressive; Conservative
See Barrhead-Westlock 1993–2004 and Whitecourt-Ste. Anne 1993–2019

The first representative for Barrhead was one-term Progressive Conservative MLA for Lac Ste. Anne Hugh Horner, who had captured his seat from the governing Social Credit in 1967. He occupied several posts in Peter Lougheed's cabinet over his career, but retired shortly after winning his fourth term as MLA in 1979.

The resulting by-election was the closest result in the history of the district, with Liberal leader Nicholas Taylor running for the seat. Progressive Conservative Candidate Ken Kowalski, however, would narrowly retain Barrhead for the government. He also served in cabinet and, when the district was abolished in 1993, went on to serve as MLA for Barrhead-Westlock.

== Election results ==
=== Elections in the 1970s ===
1971 Alberta general election
Party	Candidate	Votes	%	±%
Progressive Conservative	Hugh Horner	3,360	59.43%	–
Social Credit	Simon Tuininga	1,651	29.20%	–
New Democratic	Herman Burke	643	11.37%	–
Total		5,654	–	–
Rejected, spoiled and declined		19	–	–
Eligible electors / turnout		7,894	71.86%	–
Progressive Conservative pickup new district.				
Source(s) Source: "Barrhead Official Results 1971 Alberta general election". Alberta Heritage Community Foundation.

1975 Alberta general election
Party	Candidate	Votes	%	±%
Progressive Conservative	Hugh Horner	3,665	67.74%	8.32%
Social Credit	Bill Seatter	919	16.99%	-12.21%
New Democratic	Arlington Corbett	826	15.27%	3.90%
Total		5,410	–	–
Rejected, spoiled and declined		21	–	–
Eligible electors / turnout		8,190	66.31%	–
Progressive Conservative hold		Swing		10.27%
Source(s) Source: "Barrhead Official Results 1975 Alberta general election". Alberta Heritage Community Foundation.

1979 Alberta general election
Party	Candidate	Votes	%	±%
Progressive Conservative	Hugh Horner	4,629	62.29%	-5.45%
Social Credit	David Bouyea	1,658	22.31%	5.32%
New Democratic	Lionel Udenberg	1,008	13.56%	-1.70%
Liberal	John V. Murphy	136	1.83%	–
Total		7,431	–	–
Rejected, spoiled and declined		N/A	–	–
Eligible electors / turnout		10,871	68.36%	–
Progressive Conservative hold		Swing		-5.39%
Source(s) Source: "Barrhead Official Results 1979 Alberta general election". Alberta Heritage Community Foundation.

Alberta provincial by-election, November 21, 1979 Following the resignation of Dr. Hugh Horner on October 1, 1979
Party	Candidate	Votes	%	±%
Progressive Conservative	Ken Kowalski	2,457	38.74	-23.55
Liberal	Nicholas Taylor	2,102	33.14	+31.31
Social Credit	David Bouyea	1,067	16.82	-5.49
New Democratic	Arlington Corbett	716	11.29	-2.27
Total valid votes		6,342	–	–
Rejected, spoiled, and declined		–	–	–
Eligible voters / turnout		11409	55.59	-13.39
Progressive Conservative hold		Swing		-27.43
Source(s) Elections Alberta. "By-elections".

=== Elections in the 1980s ===
1982 Alberta general election
Party	Candidate	Votes	%	±%
Progressive Conservative	Ken Kowalski	5,001	51.44%	-10.85%
Liberal	Nicholas Taylor	3,331	34.26%	32.43%
Western Canada Concept	John Thomas Mitchell	633	6.51%	–
New Democratic	Harold Wharton	478	4.92%	-8.65%
Social Credit	Shirley Bassani	240	2.47%	-19.84%
Reform	Ernie Charman	39	0.40%	–
Total		9,722	–	–
Rejected, spoiled and declined		13	–	–
Eligible electors / turnout		12,226	79.63%	–
Progressive Conservative hold		Swing		-11.40%
Source(s) Source: "Barrhead Official Results 1982 Alberta general election". Alberta Heritage Community Foundation.

1986 Alberta general election
Party	Candidate	Votes	%	±%
Progressive Conservative	Ken Kowalski	5,092	57.82%	6.38%
New Democratic	Larry E. McConnell	2,303	26.15%	21.24%
Liberal	Mary Lou Ehrenholz	637	7.23%	-27.03%
Independent	Herb Brent	539	6.12%	–
Representative	Ferne Nutt	235	2.67%	–
Total		8,806	–	–
Rejected, spoiled and declined		13	–	–
Eligible electors / turnout		14,491	60.86%	–
Progressive Conservative hold		Swing		7.25%
Source(s) Source: "Barrhead Official Results 1986 Alberta general election". Alberta Heritage Community Foundation.

1989 Alberta general election
Party	Candidate	Votes	%	±%
Progressive Conservative	Ken Kowalski	5,294	57.51%	6.07%
New Democratic	Harold Wharton	1,673	18.17%	13.26%
Liberal	Dave Perrin	1,660	18.03%	-16.23%
Social Credit	J. Harvey Yuill	578	6.28%	3.81%
Total		9,205	–	–
Rejected, spoiled and declined		16	–	–
Eligible electors / turnout		14,426	63.92%	–
Progressive Conservative hold		Swing		3.83%
Source(s) Source: "Barrhead Official Results 1989 Alberta general election". Alberta Heritage Community Foundation.

== See also ==
- List of Alberta provincial electoral districts
- Canadian provincial electoral districts
