= Alfred Macyk =

Canadian politician (1924–2018)

Member of the Legislative Assembly of Alberta
- In office June 29, 1955 – June 18, 1959
- Preceded by: Peter Chaba
- Succeeded by: John Dubetz
- Constituency: Redwater

Personal details
- Born: March 2, 1924 Alberta, Canada
- Died: May 1, 2018 (aged 94) Edmonton, Alberta, Canada
- Party: Liberal
- Spouse: Sophie
- Children: four
- Occupation: politician

Alfred Macyk (March 2, 1924 – May 1, 2018) was a provincial politician from Alberta, Canada. He served as a member of the Legislative Assembly of Alberta from 1955 to 1959 sitting with the Liberal caucus in opposition.

== Political career ==
Macyk ran for a seat to the Alberta Legislature as a Liberal candidate in the electoral district of Redwater in the 1955 Alberta general election. He defeated incumbent MLA Peter Chaba on the third vote count to win the four way race and pickup the seat for his party.

Macyk ran for a second term in office in the 1959 Alberta general election. He was handily defeated by Social Credit candidate John Dubetz finishing second ahead of Progressive Conservative candidate Martha Bielish in the three way race. He died on May 1, 2018.
