= Michael Senych =

Canadian politician

Michael Senych (September 24, 1926 – March 27, 2002) was a politician from Alberta, Canada. He served in the Legislative Assembly of Alberta from 1963 to 1971 as a member of the Social Credit Party.

== Early life ==
Michael Senych was born in Corbin, British Columbia. He attended the University of Alberta and worked twenty-six years as a teacher before entering provincial politics.

== Political career ==
Senych was elected to the Alberta legislature in the district of Redwater in the 1963 general election. He ran for and won a second term in 1967 He ran for a third term in office in the new electoral district of Redwater-Andrew in the 1971 general election; he was defeated by George Topolnisky of the Progressive Conservative Party.

Senych attempted a return to the legislature in the 1982 general election; he ran as an independent in Redwater-Andrew and was defeated by Topolnisky again, finishing in fourth place out of five candidates. He ran once more under the Representative Party banner in the 1986 Alberta general election; he finished a distant third to Progressive Conservative candidate Steve Zarusky.

Senych was elected Mayor of the Village of Thorhild in 1996 and served until his death in a motor vehicle accident in 2002.

Legislative Assembly of Alberta
Preceded by John Dubetz	MLA Redwater; 1963–1971	Succeeded by Nicholas Taylor
