= Barrhead-Morinville-Westlock =

Defunct provincial electoral district in Alberta, Canada

Alberta electoral district
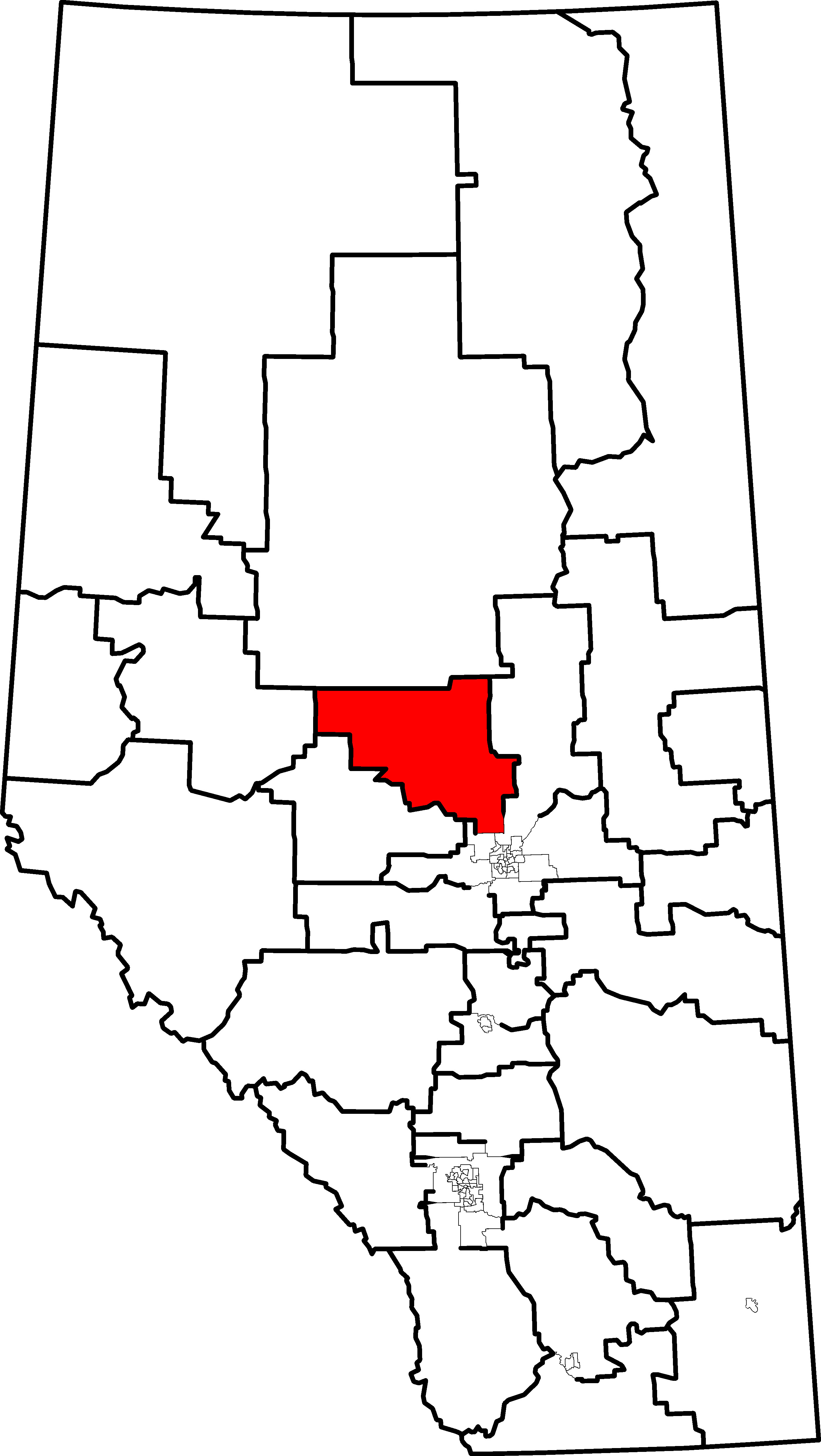
- 2010 boundaries

Defunct provincial electoral district
- Legislature: Legislative Assembly of Alberta
- District created: 2003
- District abolished: 2019
- First contested: 2004
- Last contested: 2015

Barrhead-Morinville-Westlock was a provincial electoral district in Alberta, Canada, mandated to return a single member to the Legislative Assembly of Alberta using the first-past-the-post method of voting from 2004 to 2019. The Barrhead-Morinville-Westlock electoral district included the towns of Barrhead, Morinville, Westlock, Swan Hills, and Legal as well as numerous smaller hamlets.

== History ==
The Barrhead-Morinville-Westlock electoral district was created in the 2004 electoral boundary re-distribution from the defunct Barrhead-Westlock riding which had formed in 1993. The riding was created by merging Barrhead-Westlock with the western portion of Redwater which had been split to make Athabasca-Redwater.

The 2010 electoral boundary re-distribution saw the boundaries revised to include a portion of land from the Lesser Slave Lake electoral district. The portion of land in the district that was part of Sturgeon County was transferred to Spruce Grove-Sturgeon-St. Albert.

The Barrhead-Morinville-Westlock electoral district was dissolved in the 2017 electoral boundary re-distribution, and portions of the district would form the newly created Athabasca-Barrhead-Westlock and Morinville-St. Albert electoral districts.

=== Boundary history ===
46 Barrhead-Morinville-Westlock 2003 boundaries
Bordering districts
North	East	West	South
Lesser Slave Lake	Athabasca-Redwater	Grande Prairie-Smoky	Spruce Grove-Sturgeon-St. Albert, Whitecourt-Ste. Anne
riding map goes here			
Legal description Legal description from Electoral Divisions Act, S.A. 2003, c. E-4.1
Starting at the intersection of the east boundary of Rge. 14 W5 and the north boundary of Twp. 67; then 1. east along the north boundary to the right bank of the Athabasca River; 2. upstream along the right bank to the north boundary of Twp. 64; 3. east along the north boundary to the east boundary of Sec. 34, Twp. 64, Rge. 25 W4; 4. south along the east boundary of Secs. 34, 27, 22, 15, 10 and 3 in Twps. 64 and 63 to the north boundary of Twp. 62; 5. east along the north boundary of Twp. 62 to the east boundary of Sec. 33 in Twp. 62, Rge. 25 W4; 6. south along the east boundary of Secs. 33, 28, 21 and 16 to the north boundary of the south half of Sec. 15; 7. east along the north boundary of the south half of Secs. 15, 14 and 13 to the east boundary of the west half of Sec. 13; 8. south along the east boundary of the west half of Secs. 13 and 12 to the north boundary of Sec. 1 in Twp. 62, Rge. 25 W4; 9. east along the north boundary of Sec. 1 in Twp. 62, Rge. 25 W4 to the east boundary of Rge. 25 W4; 10. south along the east boundary of Rge. 25 W4 to the north boundary of Twp. 61; 11. east along the north boundary of Twp. 61 to the east boundary of Rge. 23 W4; 12. south along the east boundary to the north boundary of Sec. 12, Twp. 61, Rge. 23 W4; 13. west along the north boundary of Secs. 12, 11 and 10 in the Twp. to the east boundary of Sec. 9 in the Twp.; 14. south along the east boundary of Secs. 9 and 4 in the Twp. and along the east boundary of Secs. 33, 28, 21, 16, 9 and 4 in Twp. 60 and the east boundary of Secs. 33, 28, 21 and 16 in Twp. 59, Rge. 23 W4; 15. east along the north boundary of Sec. 10, Twp. 59, Rge. 23 W4 to the east boundary of Sec. 10 in the Twp.; 16. south along the east boundary of Secs. 10 and 3 in the Twp. and Secs. 33, 28 and 21 in Twp. 58 to the north boundary of Sec. 16 in Twp. 58; 17. west along the north boundary of Secs. 16, 17 and 18 in the Twp. and the north boundary of Secs. 13, 14, 15 and 16 in Twp. 58, Rge. 24 W4 to the east boundary of Sec. 17; 18. south along the east boundary of Secs. 17, 8 and 5 in Twp. 58 and the east boundary of Secs. 32, 29, 20, 17, 8 and 5 in Twps. 57 and 56 and the east boundary of Secs. 32, 29, 20 and 17 in Twp. 55 to the north boundary of Sec. 8; 19. west along the north boundary of Secs. 8 and 7 in Rge. 24 W4 and the north boundary of Secs. 12, 11 and 10 in Rge. 25 W4 to the centre line of Highway 2; 20. north along the centre line of Highway 2 to the north boundary of Sec. 5 in Twp. 58, Rge. 25 W4; 21. west along the north boundary of Secs. 5 and 6 in Twp. 58, Rge. 25 and Secs. 1, 2 and 3 in Twp. 58, Rge. 26 to the east boundary of the west half of Sec. 3; 22. south along the east boundary of the west half of Sec. 3 in Twp. 58, Rge. 26 W4 and the east boundary of the west half of Sec. 34 in Twp. 57, Rge. 26 to the north boundary of Sec. 27; 23. west along the north boundary of Secs. 27 and 28 in Twp. 57, Rge. 26 to the east boundary of the west half of Sec. 28; 24. south along the east boundary of the west half of Secs. 28, 21 and 16 to the north boundary of Sec. 9, Twp. 57, Rge 26 W4; 25. west along the north boundary of Secs. 9, 8 and 7 to the east boundary of Rge. 27; 26. south along the east boundary of Rge. 27 to the north boundary of Sec. 1 in Twp. 57, Rge. 27 W4; 27. west along the north boundary of Secs. 1, 2, 3, 4 and 5 to the east boundary of the west half of Sec. 8; 28. north along the east boundary of the west half of Sec. 8 to the north boundary of the south half of Sec. 8, Twp. 57, Rge. 27 W4; 29. west along the north boundary of the south half of Sec. 8 in Twp. 57, Rge. 27 W4 to the east boundary of Sec. 7; 30. north along the east boundary of Secs. 7 and 18 to the north boundary of the south half of Sec. 18 in Twp. 57, Rge 27 W4; 31. west along the north boundary of the south half of Sec. 18 and Secs. 13 and 14 in Twp. 57, Rge. 1 W5 to the east boundary of Sec. 15; 32. south along the east boundary of Secs. 15, 10 and 3 in Twp. 57, Rge. 1 W5 and Secs. 34, 27 and 22 in Twp. 56, Rge. 1 W5 to the north boundary of the south half of Section 22; 33. west along the north boundary of the south half of Secs. 22, 21, 20 and 19 in the Twp. to the east boundary of Rge. 2 W5; 34. north along the east boundary to the north boundary of Twp. 56; 35. west along the north boundary to the east boundary of the west half of Sec. 6, Twp. 57, Rge. 2 W5; 36. north along the east boundary of the west half of Secs. 6 and 7 in the Twp. to the north boundary of Sec. 7; 37. west along the north boundary to the east boundary of Rge. 3 W5; 38. north along the east boundary to the north boundary of the south half of Sec. 13, Twp. 57, Rge. 3 W5; 39. west along the north boundary of the south half of Sec. 13 to the east boundary of the west half of Sec. 13; 40. north along the east boundary of the west half of Secs. 13 and 24 in the Twp. to the north boundary of the south half of Sec. 24; 41. west along the north boundary of the south half of Secs. 24 and 23 in the Twp. to the east boundary of Sec. 22 in the Twp.; 42. north along the east boundary of Secs. 22, 27 and 34 to the north boundary of Twp. 57; 43. west along the north boundary to the right bank of the Pembina River; 44. upstream along the right bank to the east boundary of the west half of Sec. 18, Twp. 57, Rge. 5 W5; 45. north along the east boundary of the west half of Secs. 18, 19, 30 and 31 in the Twp. to the north boundary of Twp. 57; 46. west along the north boundary to the east boundary of Sec. 3, Twp. 58, Rge. 6 W5; 47. north along the east boundary of Secs. 3, 10, 15 and 22 in the Twp. to the north boundary of Sec. 22; 48. west along the north boundary to the east boundary of Sec. 28 in the Twp.; 49. north along the east boundary of Secs. 28 and 33 in the Twp. to the north boundary of Twp. 58; 50. west along the north boundary to the east boundary of Sec. 4, Twp. 59, Rge. 6 W5; 51. north along the east boundary of Secs. 4, 9, 16 and 21 in the Twp. to the north boundary of Sec. 21; 52. west along the north boundary of Secs. 21, 20 and 19 in the Twp. and the north boundary of Secs. 24, 23, 22 and 21 in Twp. 59, Rge. 7 W5 to the east boundary of Sec. 29 in the Twp.; 53. north along the east boundary of Secs. 29 and 32 in the Twp. to the north boundary of Twp. 59; 54. west along the north boundary to the east boundary of Rge. 9 W5; 55. north along the east boundary to the right bank of the Athabasca River; 56. downstream along the right bank to the north boundary of Twp. 60; 57. west along the north boundary to the east boundary of Rge. 11 W5; 58. north along the east boundary to the north boundary of Twp. 63; 59. west along the north boundary to the east boundary of Rge. 14 W5; 60. north along the east boundary to the starting point.
Note:

50 Barrhead-Morinville-Westlock 2010 boundaries
Bordering districts
North	East	West	South
Lesser Slave Lake	Athabasca-Sturgeon-Redwater	Grande Prairie-Smoky, Whitecourt-Ste. Anne	Spruce Grove-St. Albert
Note: Boundary descriptions were not used in the 2010 redistribution

=== Representation history ===
Members of the Legislative Assembly for Barrhead-Morinville-Westlock
Assembly	Years	Member	Party
See Barrhead-Westlock 1993-2004 and Redwater 1993-2004
26th	2004–2008	Ken Kowalski	Progressive; Conservative
27th	2008–2012	Ken Kowalski	Progressive; Conservative
28th	2012–2015	Maureen Kubinec	Progressive; Conservative
29th	2015–2017	Glenn van Dijken	Wildrose
29th	2017-2019	Glenn van Dijken	United Conservative
See Athabasca-Barrhead-Westlock and Morinville-St. Albert 2019-

The riding was created in the 2004 boundary redistribution. Its predecessor districts Barrhead-Westlock had been solidly represented by Progressive Conservative and while Redwater saw a mixture of Liberal and Progressive Conservative MLA's returned in recent decades.

Former Speaker of the Assembly Ken Kowalski had served as a member in the area since winning a by-election in 1979. Prior to being Speaker he had previously held some cabinet portfolios in the Alberta government. He was returned to office when the district was created in 2004 and re-elected in 2008 with landslide pluralities.

The 2012 election saw a closely contested race with Progressive Conservative candidate Maureen Kubinec defeating former senator-in-waiting Link Byfield by a few hundred votes to hold the district.

== Legislative election results ==
=== 2004 ===
2004 Alberta general election
Party	Candidate	Votes	%	±%
Progressive Conservative	Ken Kowalski	7,066	59.30%	–
Liberal	Alan Fiebich	2,310	19.39%	–
New Democratic	Peggy Kirkeby	1,113	9.34%	–
Alberta Alliance	Mike Radojcic	1,020	8.56%	–
Social Credit	Carl Haugen	407	3.42%	–
Total		11,916	–	–
Rejected, spoiled and declined		41	–	–
Eligible electors / turnout		22,732	52.60%	–
Progressive Conservative pickup new district.				
Source(s) Source: "Elections Alberta 2004 General Election". Elections Alberta.

=== 2008 ===
2008 Alberta general election
Party	Candidate	Votes	%	±%
Progressive Conservative	Ken Kowalski	8,312	70.26%	10.96%
Liberal	Leslie I. Penny	1,804	15.25%	-4.14%
New Democratic	Rodney M. Olstad	927	7.84%	-1.51%
Green	Daniel Evans	479	4.05%	–
Social Credit	Carl Haugen	309	2.61%	-0.80%
Total		11,831	–	–
Rejected, spoiled and declined		46	–	–
Eligible electors / turnout		24,792	47.91%	–
Progressive Conservative hold		Swing		7.55%
Source(s) Source: "Elections Alberta 2008 General Election". Elections Alberta.

=== 2012 ===
2012 Alberta general election
Party	Candidate	Votes	%	±%
Progressive Conservative	Maureen Kubinec	7,447	44.72%	-25.53%
Wildrose Alliance	Link Byfield	7,103	42.66%	–
New Democratic	Trudy Grebenstein	983	5.90%	-1.93%
Liberal	Leslie Penny	931	5.59%	-9.66%
Evergreen	Lisa Grant	188	1.13%	–
Total		16,652	–	–
Rejected, spoiled and declined		52	–	–
Eligible electors / turnout		27,394	60.98%	–
Progressive Conservative hold		Swing		-26.47%
Source(s) Source: "Elections Alberta 2012 General Election". Elections Alberta.

=== 2015 ===
2015 Alberta general election
Party	Candidate	Votes	%	±%
Wildrose	Glenn van Dijken	7,206	39.35%	-3.31%
New Democratic	Tristan Turner	6,232	34.03%	28.13%
Progressive Conservative	Maureen Kubinec	4,876	26.62%	-18.10%
Total		18,314	–	–
Rejected, spoiled and declined		59	–	–
Eligible electors / turnout		28,176	65.21%	–
Wildrose gain from Progressive Conservative		Swing		1.63%
Source(s) Source: "Elections Alberta 2015 General Election". Elections Alberta.

== Senate nominee election results ==
=== 2004 ===
2004 Senate nominee election results: Barrhead-Morinville-Westlock				Turnout 52.09%	
Affiliation	Candidate	Votes	% votes	% ballots	Rank
Progressive Conservative	Cliff Breitkreuz	6,156	20.29%	59.70%	3
Progressive Conservative	Betty Unger	4,320	14.24%	41.89%	2
Progressive Conservative	Bert Brown	3,600	11.87%	34.91%	1
Independent	Link Byfield	3,279	10.81%	31.80%	4
Progressive Conservative	David Usherwood	2,459	8.11%	23.85%	6
Alberta Alliance	Michael Roth	2,356	7.77%	22.85%	7
Progressive Conservative	Jim Silye	2,230	7.35%	21.63%	5
Alberta Alliance	Gary Horan	2,133	7.03%	20.69%	10
Alberta Alliance	Vance Gough	2,130	7.02%	20.66%	8
Independent	Tom Sindlinger	1,674	5.51%	16.23%	9
Total votes		30,337	100%		
Total ballots		10,312	2.94 votes per ballot		
Rejected, spoiled and declined		1,530			

Voters had the option of selecting four candidates on the ballot

== Student vote results ==
=== 2004 ===
Participating schools
Barrhead Composite School
Dunstable School
Eleanor Hall School
Fort Assiniboine School
Morinville Community High School
St. Mary School
Westlock Elementary

On November 19, 2004, a student vote was conducted at participating Alberta schools to parallel the 2004 Alberta general election results. The vote was designed to educate students and simulate the electoral process for persons who have not yet reached the legal majority. The vote was conducted in 80 of the 83 provincial electoral districts with students voting for actual election candidates. Schools with a large student body that reside in another electoral district had the option to vote for candidates outside of the electoral district then where they were physically located.

2004 Alberta student vote results
Affiliation	Candidate	Votes	%
Progressive Conservative	Ken Kowalski	317	32.68%
Liberal	Alan Fiebich	228	23.51%
New Democratic	Peggy Kirkeby	206	21.24%
Alberta Alliance	Mike Radojcic	166	17.11%
Social Credit	Carl Haugen	53	5.46%
Total		970	100%
Rejected, spoiled and declined		36	

=== 2012 ===
2012 Alberta student vote results
Affiliation	Candidate	Votes	%
Progressive Conservative	Maureen Kubinec		%
Wildrose	Link Byfield		
Liberal			%
New Democratic	Bryan Young		%
Total			100%

== See also ==
- List of Alberta provincial electoral districts
- Canadian provincial electoral districts
