= Mary Anne Balsillie =

Canadian politician

Mary Anne Balsillie is a former politician from Alberta, Canada.

In 1977, she was elected to the Municipal Council for the Town of Morinville. She served as a town councillor until 1992 when she ran for mayor and defeated long-time incumbent Ross Quinn. She served as mayor until 1996.

Balsillie worked for the Alberta Home and School Association, and became part of a committee to help create Bill 41, the School Amendment Act; it was introduced in the Alberta legislature in 1992. The bill was designed to help increase rights for francophone parents and students. The bill died in committee.

Following Redwater MLA Nicholas Taylor's appointment to the Senate in 1996, Balsillie ran in the ensuing by-election for the Alberta Liberals. She again defeated Ross Quinn, who represented the Progressive Conservatives, by 98 votes. As a member of the Official Opposition, she served on the Law and Regulations Committee.

In the 1997 Alberta general election, Balsillie was defeated by Progressive Conservative Dave Broda by 316 votes. In 2001, she was elected as a representative to the Aspen Regional Health Authority. She is currently the executive director for the St. Albert Stop Abuse in Families (SAIF) Society in St. Albert.

Legislative Assembly of Alberta
| Preceded by Nicholas Taylor | MLA Redwater; 1996–1997 | Succeeded by Dave Broda |
