= John Dubetz =

Canadian politician (1916-2002)

Member of the Legislative Assembly of Alberta
- In office June 18, 1959 – June 17, 1963
- Preceded by: Alfred Macyk
- Succeeded by: Michael Senych
- Constituency: Redwater

Personal details
- Born: July 7, 1916 Smoky Lake, Alberta, Canada
- Died: February 12, 2002 (aged 85) Edmonton, Alberta, Canada
- Party: Social Credit
- Occupation: politician

John Dubetz (1916-2002) was a politician from Alberta, Canada. He served in the Legislative Assembly of Alberta from 1959 to 1963 as a member of the Social Credit caucus in government.

== Political career ==
Dubetz ran for a seat to the Alberta Legislature in the 1959 Alberta general election as a Social Credit candidate in the electoral district of Redwater. He defeated incumbent Liberal MLA Alfred Macyk and future Senator Martha Bielish with just under half of the popular vote to pick up the district for his party. He retired at dissolution of the assembly in 1963.
