= Paddle River =

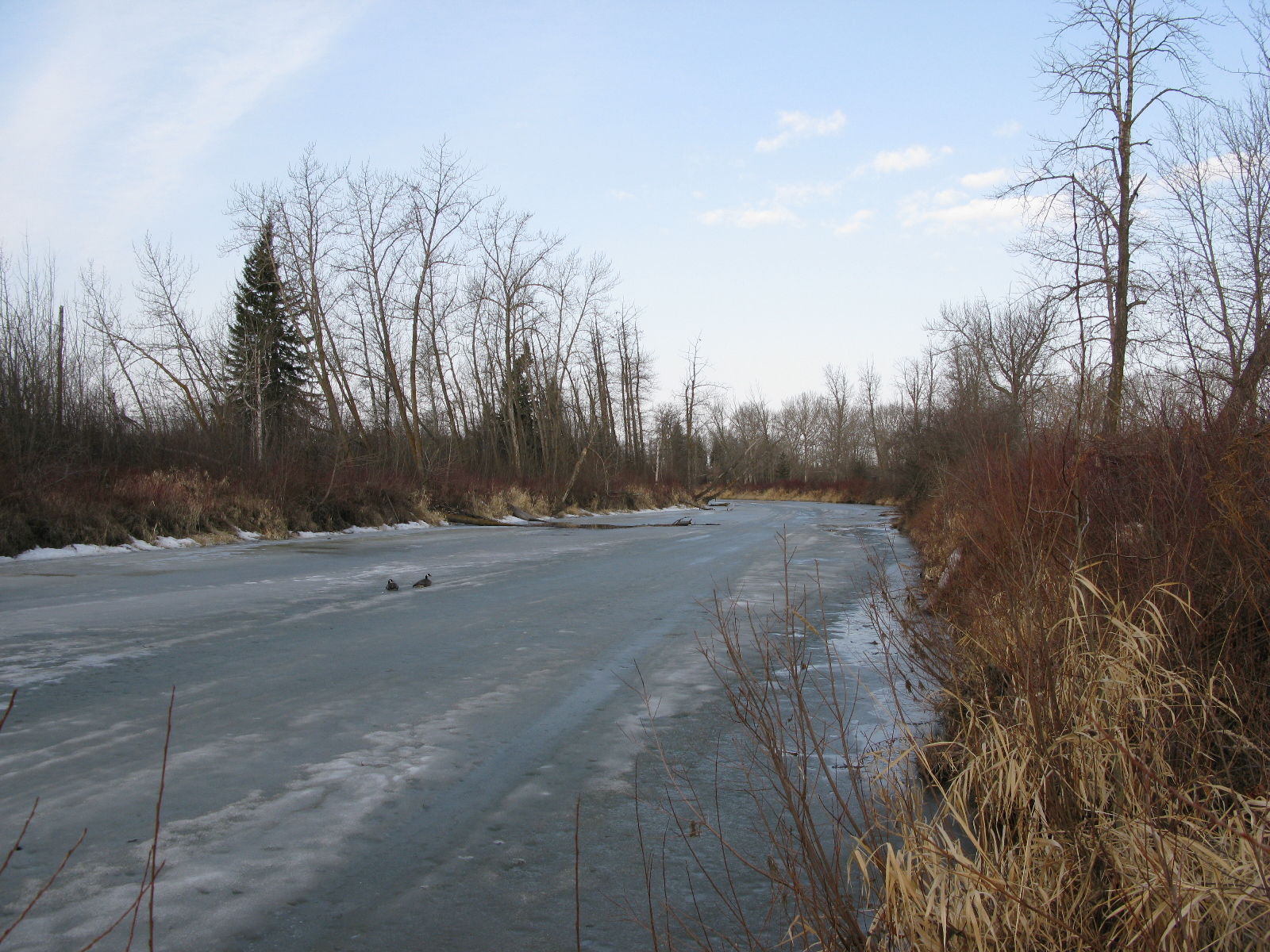

Location
- Country: Canada
- Province: Alberta

Physical characteristics
- Source
  - location: Paddle River Headwaters
  - coordinates: 53°55′19″N 115°39′13″W
  - elevation: 896 m (2,940 ft)
- Mouth
  - location: Pembina River
  - coordinates: 54°06′21″N 114°14′54″W
  - elevation: 627 m (2,057 ft)

The Paddle River is a short river in northern Alberta, Canada. Known as Pimiskāw sīpiy (Paddle River) by the Cree, the river was named because of its slow speed. During the fur trade era, a canoe could be easily paddled up the river, in contrast to the more arduous task of ascending a swifter river like the Pembina River that required poling or tracking.

== Course ==
The river generally flows in an eastward direction from its headwaters, although there are significant meanders and a large number of oxbow lakes along its course. It passes near the hamlet of Rochfort Bridge, and brushes the municipality of Barrhead before joining the Pembina River near Manola, Alberta. It is bridged by many secondary highways, as well as Alberta Highway 43 and Alberta Highway 33.

== Flooding ==
Throughout the history of European settlement along the Paddle River, flooding has been a constant issue. Both farmers and ranchers were attracted to the floodplain of the river due to the high quality of its soils. As human settlement increased, the economic costs associated with flooding became much more pronounced. Residents of the area eventually formed the 'Paddle River Drainage Association' to petition the provincial government for flood control. The Alberta Government eventually constructed a dam on the river near Rochfort Bridge to mitigate some of the worst effects of the flooding.

== Tributaries ==
- Little Paddle River
- Romeo Creek
- Connor Creek
- Maxwell Lake
- Kipp Lake
- Neville Lake

== See also ==
- List of Alberta rivers
