= Steve Zarusky =

Canadian politician (born 1943)

MLA for Redwater-Andrew
- In office 1986–1993
- Preceded by: George Topolnisky
- Succeeded by: district abolished

Personal details
- Born: June 20, 1943 (age 82) Smoky Lake, Alberta
- Party: Progressive Conservative Association of Alberta

Steve P. Zarusky (born June 20, 1943) is a former provincial level politician from Alberta, Canada. He served as a member of the Legislative Assembly of Alberta from 1986 to 1993. He is of Ukrainian descent.

== Political career ==
Zarusky ran as a candidate for the Progressive Conservatives in the 1986 Alberta general election. He won the Redwater-Andrew electoral district defeating three other candidates including former Social Credit MLA Michael Senych. He ran for a second term in office in the 1989 Alberta general election. In that race he increased his plurality and won the district comfortably. Redwater-Andrew was abolished due to redistribution in 1993. Zarusky ran for a third term in the reconstituted Redwater electoral district. He was defeated by former Liberal leader Nicholas Taylor.
