= Nicholas Taylor (politician) =

Canadian politician (1927–2020)

The Honourable Nick Taylor

Canadian Senator from Alberta
- In office March 7, 1996 – November 17, 2002

Member of the Legislative Assembly of Alberta
- In office 1986–1996
- Constituency: Westlock-Sturgeon (1986–93); Redwater (1993–96)

Leader of the Alberta Liberal Party
- In office 1974–1988
- Preceded by: Robert Russell
- Succeeded by: Laurence Decore

Personal details
- Born: Nicholas William Taylor; November 17, 1927 Bow Island, Alberta, Canada
- Died: October 3, 2020 (aged 92) Calgary, Alberta, Canada
- Party: Liberal
- Spouse: Margaret Davies (m. 1949)
- Children: nine
- Education: University of Alberta
- Profession: Businessman, geologist, engineer

Nicholas William "Nick" Taylor (November 17, 1927 – October 3, 2020) was a geologist, businessman and politician from Alberta, Canada.

== Early life ==
Nicholas William Taylor was born November 17, 1927, in Bow Island, Alberta to Marie Louise Ancion and Frederick David Taylor, and was the eldest of five children. Taylor traveled to Medicine Hat for High School, and attended the University of Alberta completing his studies in geology and mining engineering in 1949. Later that year Taylor married Margaret Davies on October 1 and together had nine children.

Taylor worked as a geologist in the petroleum industry in Alberta during the 1950s and later started his own company Lochiel Exploration Ltd. in 1960. Lochiel Exploration would prove to be successful, branching out to several countries until it entered receivership in 1986 following the downturn in oil markets.

== Political career ==
Taylor started his political career by running in the 1968 and 1972 federal elections in Calgary Centre as a member of the Liberal Party of Canada. He was defeated both times.

Taylor served as leader of the Alberta Liberal Party from 1974 to 1988. Taylor defeated his opponent for Liberal leadership John Borger, a former Centre for the Calgary Stampeders and PhD in biochemistry. At the beginning of his leadership, the party was at its lowest point in history: the last Liberal to serve in the Alberta Legislative Assembly, Bill Dickie of Calgary Glenmore, had crossed the floor to the Progressive Conservatives in 1969. Taylor slowly rebuilt the party, donating significant sums of his own money to keep it viable — with The Globe and Mail estimating the total above $100,000. In 1976, he disaffiliated the Alberta Liberal Party from the Liberal Party of Canada, after the Alberta Liberals received no funding from the federal party for the 1975 Alberta general election, with the federal wing instead supporting the Social Credit Party of Alberta in exchange for support in Parliament. Even so, the federal party's unpopularity in Alberta and its implementation of such programs as the National Energy Program still proved difficult for the Alberta party.

In the 1986 Alberta general election, the Liberals made a breakthrough by winning four seats. Taylor himself was elected by over 500 votes in the newly created northern Alberta riding of Westlock-Sturgeon. Despite the breakthrough, Taylor's leadership was challenged, and he was defeated at the 1988 Liberal Convention by Edmonton Mayor Laurence Decore, garnering only 18 percent support. Taylor remained in politics and was re-elected in 1989. In 1993, he moved to the newly created riding of Redwater, facing incumbent PC MLA Steve Zarusky, and was narrowly elected by 1,700 votes.

During his time in the Alberta Legislature, Taylor was known for his wit and banter with government members. On May 13, 1991, Taylor was ejected from the Legislature by Speaker David J. Carter for unparliamentary language following a resolution to congratulate Baltej Singh Dhillon, the first RCMP officer to wear a turban, was defeated. Taylor yelled "shame" at the government and called Speaker Carter "one of the crappiest speakers [I've] ever seen". Taylor apologized the next day. His banter led to two Premiers issuing "no-laugh" orders to their caucuses when Taylor would speak negatively about the Progressive Conservative government or Ministers.

Taylor was appointed to the Senate of Canada by Jean Chrétien in 1996 and served there until 2002, choosing Bon Accord and Sturgeon as his Senatorial constituency. Taylor was appointed to replace Bud Olson who was appointed as the 14th Lieutenant Governor of Alberta. Following his appointment, Taylor acknowledged his appointment as patronage following criticism from prominent Reform Party Albertans. Future Prime Minister and Member of Parliament Stephen Harper criticized the appointment, stating "Mr. Taylor's only real qualification to the Senate is that he was Liberal leader and had the audacity to continue to be Liberal leader during the period of the National Energy Program".

== Later life ==
Following his mandatory retirement from the Senate at the age of 75, Taylor retired from politics. In 2019, Taylor testified before the Senate Standing Committee on Energy, the Environment and Natural Resources in defence of Bill C-69, which amended the regulatory review process for energy projects.

Taylor died in Peter Lougheed Hospital in Calgary on October 3, 2020, at the age of 92.

== Electoral record ==
=== Federal elections ===
1968 Canadian federal election
Party	Candidate	Votes	%
Progressive Conservative	Douglas Harkness	16,977	47.07
Liberal	Nicholas Taylor	16,676	46.24
New Democratic	Margaret Jackson	2,413	6.69
Total		36,066	100.00

1972 Canadian federal election
Party	Candidate	Votes	%	±%
Progressive Conservative	Harvie Andre	22,669	53.30	+6.23
Liberal	Nicholas Taylor	13,110	30.82	-15.42
New Democratic	David Jones	5,538	13.02	+6.33
Social Credit	Clifford Willmott	1,081	2.54	*
No affiliation	Frank Cottingham	80	0.19	*
No affiliation	Colin Constant	53	0.12	*
Total		42,531	100.00	

=== Provincial elections ===
Alberta provincial by-election, November 21, 1979: Barrhead Following the resignation of Dr. Hugh Horner on October 1, 1979
Party	Candidate	Votes	%	±%
Progressive Conservative	Ken Kowalski	2,457	38.74	-23.55
Liberal	Nicholas Taylor	2,102	33.14	+31.31
Social Credit	David Bouyea	1,067	16.82	-5.49
New Democratic	Arlington Corbett	716	11.29	-2.27
Total valid votes		6,342	–	–
Rejected, spoiled, and declined		–	–	–
Eligible voters / turnout		11409	55.59	-13.39
Progressive Conservative hold		Swing		-27.43
Source(s) Elections Alberta. "By-elections".

1982 Alberta general election: Barrhead
Party	Candidate	Votes	%	±%
Progressive Conservative	Ken Kowalski	5,001	51.44%	-10.85%
Liberal	Nicholas Taylor	3,331	34.26%	32.43%
Western Canada Concept	John Thomas Mitchell	633	6.51%	–
New Democratic	Harold Wharton	478	4.92%	-8.65%
Social Credit	Shirley Bassani	240	2.47%	-19.84%
Reform	Ernie Charman	39	0.40%	–
Total		9,722	–	–
Rejected, spoiled and declined		13	–	–
Eligible electors / turnout		12,226	79.63%	–
Progressive Conservative hold		Swing		-11.40%
Source(s) Source: "Barrhead Official Results 1982 Alberta general election". Alberta Heritage Community Foundation.

1986 Alberta general election: Westlock-Sturgeon
Party	Candidate	Votes	%	±%
Liberal	Nicholas Taylor	4,523	38.95%	–
Progressive Conservative	Lawrence Kluthe	4,049	34.87%	–
New Democratic	Bruce Lennon	1,996	17.19%	–
Representative	Tom Carleton	911	7.84%	–
Confederation of Regions	Adam Hauch	78	0.67%	–
Communist	Laurent St. Denis	29	0.25%	–
Heritage	Stan Pearson	25	0.22%	–
Total valid votes		11,611	–	–
Rejected, spoiled and declined		12	–	–
Registered electors / turnout		18,572	62.58%	–
Liberal pickup new district.				
Source(s) Source: "Westlock-Sturgeon Official Results 1986 Alberta general election". Alberta Heritage Community Foundation.

1989 Alberta general election: Westlock-Sturgeon
Party	Candidate	Votes	%	±%
Liberal	Nicholas Taylor	5,401	44.80%	+5.85%
Progressive Conservative	Leo Seguin	4,958	41.13%	+6.26%
New Democratic	Tom Turner	1,696	14.07%	-3.12%
Total valid votes		12,055	–	–
Rejected, spoiled and declined		15	–	–
Registered electors / turnout		19,662	61.38%	-1.20%
Liberal hold		Swing		-0.21%
Source(s) Source: "Westlock-Sturgeon Official Results 1989 Alberta general election". Alberta Heritage Community Foundation.

1993 Alberta general election: Redwater
Party	Candidate	Votes	%
Liberal	Nicholas Taylor	6,429	51.38%
Progressive Conservative	Steve Zarusky	4,582	36.62%
New Democratic	Robert Tomkins	1,306	10.44%
Natural Law	Geoff Toane	196	1.57%
Total valid votes		12,513	
Rejected, spoiled and declined		22	
Registered electors / Turnout		19,775	63.39%
Liberal pickup new district.			

Party political offices
Preceded by Robert Russell	Leader of the Alberta Liberal Party; 1974–1988	Succeeded by Laurence Decore
Legislative Assembly of Alberta
Preceded by New District	MLA Westlock-Sturgeon; 1986–1993	Succeeded by District Abolished
Preceded by Michael Senych	MLA Redwater; 1993–1996	Succeeded by Mary Anne Balsillie
