= Redwater (provincial electoral district) =

Defunct provincial electoral district in Alberta, Canada

Coordinates: 54.09°N 112.48°W

Alberta electoral district

Defunct provincial electoral district
- Legislature: Legislative Assembly of Alberta
- District created: 1940
- District abolished: 1971
- District re-created: 1993
- District re-abolished: 2004
- First contested: 1940
- Last contested: 2001

Redwater was a provincial electoral district in Alberta, Canada, mandated to return a single member to the Legislative Assembly of Alberta from 1940 to 1971 and again from 1993 to 2004.

== History ==
Members of the Legislative Assembly for Redwater
Assembly	Years	Member	Party
See Sturgeon 1905-1940 and Whitford 1913-1940
9th	1940–1944	James Popil	Social Credit
10th	1944–1948	James Popil	Social Credit
11th	1948–1952	Peter Chaba	Social Credit
12th	1952–1955	Peter Chaba	Social Credit
13th	1955–1959	Alfred Macyk	Liberal
14th	1959–1963	John Dubetz	Social Credit
15th	1963–1967	Michael Senych	Social Credit
16th	1967–1971	Michael Senych	Social Credit
See Redwater-Andrew 1971-1993 and Westlock- Sturgeon 1986-1993
23rd	1993–1996	Nicholas Taylor	Liberal
23rd	1996	Vacant	
23rd	1996-1997	Mary Anne Balsillie	Liberal
24th	1997–2001	Dave Broda	Progressive; Conservative
25th	2001–2004	Dave Broda	Progressive; Conservative
See Athabasca-Redwater 2004-2012

=== Boundary history ===
Redwater was created in 1940 from most of the Sturgeon district and a part of Whitford, consisting of the area around Smoky Lake, with the North Saskatchewan River forming its southern boundary. When neighbouring Beaver River was abolished in 1952 a small portion was transferred to Redwater, but otherwise no boundary changes were made until the riding was abolished in 1971. It was replaced by the larger Redwater-Andrew.

In 1993, Redwater was created again out of most of Redwater-Andrew and the part of Westlock-Sturgeon containing Morinville. The new riding extended much further southwest than the original Redwater, touching the northern boundary of Edmonton. It underwent no boundary adjustments until abolished in 2004, with most of the riding transferred to Athabasca-Redwater and a small sliver to Barrhead-Morinville-Westlock.

=== Representation history ===
The riding's first MLA was James Popil, who had already served one term for Social Credit in Sturgeon and was re-elected twice in Redwater. He was succeeded by Peter Chaba, a Ukrainian immigrant, who also held the riding for two terms.

In 1955, however, Chaba was narrowly defeated by Liberal Alfred Macyk on the third count. The Social Credit government then abolished instant-runoff voting because of the Liberal Party's resurgence, and Macyk was defeated in 1959 by their candidate, John Dubetz.

When Dubetz decided not to run again in 1963, Social Credit chose Michael Senych as their candidate. He held the riding for two terms, until it was abolished in 1971.

When Redwater was re-created in 1993, two incumbent MLAs ran against each other: former Liberal leader and two-term MLA for Westlock-Sturgeon, Nicholas Taylor, faced off against Steve Zarusky, two-term PC MLA for Redwater-Andrew. Taylor won by a significant margin, and three years later was subsequently appointed to the Senate by Jean Chrétien. The resulting 1996 by-election was won by another Liberal, Mary Anne Balsillie, by a razor-thin margin.

However, the governing Progressive Conservatives would capture the riding in the following year, with candidate Dave Broda defeating Balsillie in an equally close contest. He was re-elected in 2001 by a much larger margin, and retired from politics when Redwater was abolished in 2004.

== Election results ==
=== 1940s ===
1940 Alberta general election
Party	Candidate	Votes	%
Social Credit	James Popil	2,226	56.27%
Independent Movement	J.I. Zubick	945	23.89%
Co-operative Commonwealth	C.J. Stimpfle	785	19.84%
Total valid votes		3,956	
Rejected, spoiled and declined		217	
Registered electors / turnout		6,425	64.95%
Social Credit pickup new district.			

1944 Alberta general election
Party	Candidate	Votes	%	±%
Social Credit	James Popil	2,390	58.45%	+2.18%
Labor–Progressive	Michael Hyduk	882	21.57%	
Co-operative Commonwealth	Dale West	817	19.98%	+0.14%
Total valid votes		4,089		
Rejected, spoiled and declined		95		
Registered electors / turnout		6,118	68.39%	+3.44%
Social Credit hold		Swing		-9.70%

1948 Alberta general election
Party	Candidate	Votes	%	±%
Social Credit	Peter Chaba	1,807	47.85%	-10.60%
Co-operative Commonwealth	John Dubeta	1,528	40.47%	+20.49%
Liberal	James Salyzyn	441	11.68%	
Second count
Social Credit	Peter Chaba	1,912	54.89%	+7.04%
Co-operative Commonwealth	John Dubeta	1,572	45.11%	+4.64%
Neither		292		
Total valid votes		3,776		
Rejected, spoiled and declined		258		
Registered electors / turnout		6,030	66.90%	-1.49%
Social Credit hold		Swing		-15.55%

=== 1950s ===
1952 Alberta general election
Party	Candidate	Votes	%	±%
Social Credit	Peter Chaba	1,677	39.52%	-8.33%
Liberal	George Repka	1,268	29.88%	+18.20%
Co-operative Commonwealth	Paul Feniak	1,002	23.62%	-16.85%
People's Candidate	Frank Maricle	296	6.98%	
Second count
Social Credit	Peter Chaba	1,833	52.72%	+13.20%
Liberal	George Repka	1,644	47.28%	+17.40%
Neither		766		
Total valid votes		4,243		
Rejected, spoiled and declined		320		
Registered electors / turnout		6,636	68.76%	+1.86%
Social Credit hold		Swing		-13.27%

1955 Alberta general election
Party	Candidate	Votes	%	±%
Liberal	Alfred Macyk	1,878	43.35%	+13.47%
Social Credit	Peter Chaba	1,632	37.67%	-1.85%
Co-operative Commonwealth	H.J. Leskiw	552	12.74%	-10.88%
Labor–Progressive	Frank Maricle	270	6.23%	
Second count
Liberal	Alfred Macyk	2,214	56.01%	+12.66%
Social Credit	Peter Chaba	1,739	43.99%	+6.32%
Neither		379		
Total valid votes		4,332		
Rejected, spoiled and declined		343		
Registered electors / turnout		6,446	72.53%	+3.77%
Liberal gain from Social Credit		Swing		+7.66

After the 1955 election, a historic breakthrough for the Liberal Party, the government of Ernest Manning abolished alternative vote and introduced first past the post voting across the province. The Social Credit candidate in Redwater was therefore able to win with less than a majority of votes in 1959. This change can also be seen in the dramatic drop in spoiled (incorrectly marked) ballots.

1959 Alberta general election
Party	Candidate	Votes	%	±%
Social Credit	John Dubetz	2,092	49.17%	+11.50%
Liberal	Alfred Macyk	1,262	29.66%	-13.69%
Progressive Conservative	Martha Bielish	901	21.18%	
Total valid votes		4,255		
Rejected, spoiled and declined		10		
Registered electors / turnout		5,965	71.50%	-1.03%
Social Credit gain from Liberal		Swing		+12.60%

=== 1960s ===
1963 Alberta general election
Party	Candidate	Votes	%	±%
Social Credit	Michael Senych	1,670	41.72%	-7.45%
Progressive Conservative	Joe Bielish	1,362	34.02%	+12.84%
Liberal	Steve Romanchuk	755	18.86%	-10.80%
New Democratic	William Glass	216	5.40%	
Total valid votes		4,003		
Rejected, spoiled and declined		10		
Registered electors / turnout		5,767	69.59%	-1.91%
Social Credit hold		Swing		-10.45%

1967 Alberta general election
Party	Candidate	Votes	%	±%
Social Credit	Michael Senych	1,588	43.64%	+1.92%
Progressive Conservative	Basil Zailo	1,314	36.11%	+2.09%
New Democratic	Norman Flack	737	20.25%	+14.85%
Total valid votes		3,639		
Rejected, spoiled and declined		18		
Registered electors / turnout		5,263	69.49%	-0.10%
Social Credit hold		Swing		-0.09%

See Redwater-Andrew and Westlock-Sturgeon for results in the 1970s and 1980s.

=== 1990s ===
1993 Alberta general election
Party	Candidate	Votes	%
Liberal	Nicholas Taylor	6,429	51.38%
Progressive Conservative	Steve Zarusky	4,582	36.62%
New Democratic	Robert Tomkins	1,306	10.44%
Natural Law	Geoff Toane	196	1.57%
Total valid votes		12,513	
Rejected, spoiled and declined		22	
Registered electors / turnout		19,775	63.39%
Liberal pickup new district.			

Alberta provincial by-election, May 21, 1996 upon the appointment of Nicholas Taylor to the Senate of Canada
Party	Candidate	Votes	%	±%
Liberal	Mary Anne Balsillie	3,671	42.29%	-9.09%
Progressive Conservative	Ross Quinn	3,573	41.16%	+4.54%
Social Credit	Don Bell	773	8.91%	
New Democratic	Tom Turner	465	5.36%	-5.08%
Forum Party of Alberta	Bill Finn	135	1.56%	
Independent	Leonard Fish	63	0.73%	
Total valid votes		8,680		
Rejected, spoiled and declined		20		
Registered electors / turnout		19,130	45.48%	-17.91%
Liberal hold		Swing		-6.82%

1997 Alberta general election
Party	Candidate	Votes	%	±%
Progressive Conservative	Dave Broda	5,297	43.88%	+2.72%
Liberal	Mary Anne Balsillie	4,980	41.25%	-1.04%
Social Credit	Don Bell	987	8.18%	-0.73%
New Democratic	Tom Turner	737	6.11%	+0.75%
Natural Law	E. Benjamin Toane	71	0.59%	
Total valid votes		12,072		
Rejected, spoiled and declined		32		
Registered electors / turnout		20,239	59.81%	+14.33%
Progressive Conservative gain from Liberal		Swing		+1.88%

=== 2000s ===
2001 Alberta general election
Party	Candidate	Votes	%	±%
Progressive Conservative	Dave Broda	7,319	58.33%	+14.45%
Liberal	Andrew Raczynski	3,924	31.27%	-9.98%
New Democratic	Mike Radojcic	658	5.24%	-0.87%
Alberta First	Tony Ollenberger	647	5.16%	
Total valid votes		12,548		
Rejected, spoiled and declined		40		
Registered electors / turnout		21,656	58.13%	-1.68%
Progressive Conservative hold		Swing		+12.22%

== Plebiscite results ==
=== 1957 liquor plebiscite ===
1957 Alberta liquor plebiscite results: Redwater
Question A: Do you approve additional types of outlets for the sale of beer, wine and spirituous liquor subject to a local vote?
Ballot choice	Votes	%
Yes	1,589	76.28%
No	494	23.72%
Total votes	2,083	100%
Rejected, spoiled and declined	17	
5,838 eligible electors, turnout 35.97%

On October 30, 1957, a stand-alone plebiscite was held province wide in all 50 of the then current provincial electoral districts in Alberta. The government decided to consult Alberta voters to decide on liquor sales and mixed drinking after a divisive debate in the legislature. The plebiscite was intended to deal with the growing demand for reforming antiquated liquor control laws.

The plebiscite was conducted in two parts. Question A, asked in all districts, asked the voters if the sale of liquor should be expanded in Alberta, while Question B, asked in a handful of districts within the corporate limits of Calgary and Edmonton, asked if men and women should be allowed to drink together in establishments.

Province wide Question A of the plebiscite passed in 33 of the 50 districts while Question B passed in all five districts. Redwater voted in favour of the proposal with a landslide majority. Voter turnout in the district was abysmal, falling well below the province wide average of 46%.

Official district returns were released to the public on December 31, 1957. The Social Credit government in power at the time did not consider the results binding. However the results of the vote led the government to repeal all existing liquor legislation and introduce an entirely new Liquor Act.

Municipal districts lying inside electoral districts that voted against the plebiscite were designated Local Option Zones by the Alberta Liquor Control Board and considered effective dry zones. Business owners that wanted a licence had to petition for a binding municipal plebiscite in order to be granted a licence.

== See also ==
- List of Alberta provincial electoral districts
- Canadian provincial electoral districts
