= Ken Kowalski =

Canadian politician

The Honourable Ken Kowalski ECA
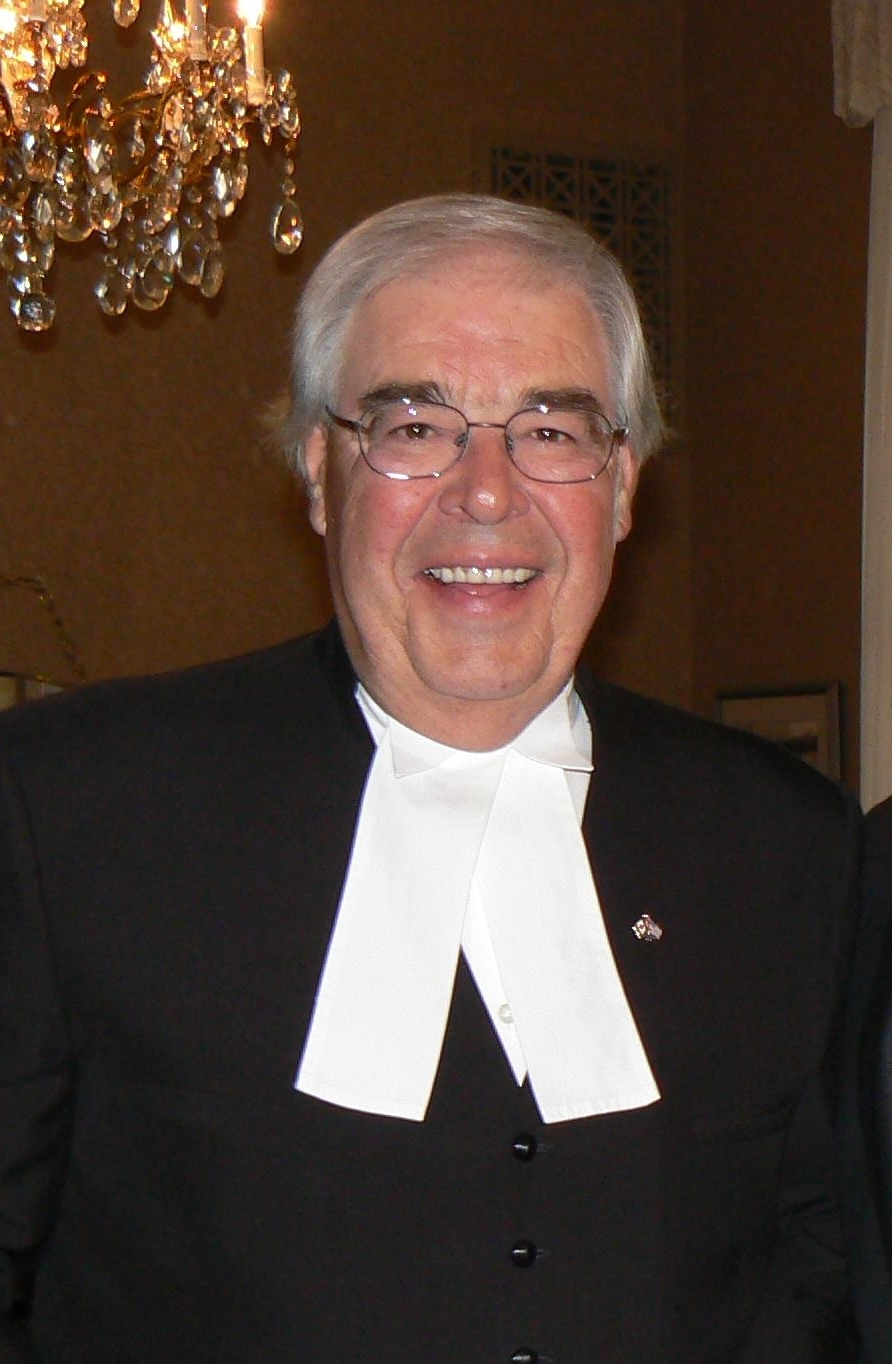

11th Speaker of the Alberta Legislative Assembly
- In office April 14, 1997 – May 23, 2012
- Preceded by: Stanley Schumacher
- Succeeded by: Gene Zwozdesky

Member of the Legislative Assembly of Alberta
- In office November 21, 1979 – 1993
- Preceded by: Hugh Horner
- Constituency: Barrhead
- In office 1993–2004
- Constituency: Barrhead-Westlock
- In office 2004–2012
- Succeeded by: Maureen Kubinec
- Constituency: Barrhead-Morinville-Westlock

Personal details
- Born: Kenneth Reginald Kowalski; September 27, 1945 (age 81) Bonnyville, Alberta
- Party: Progressive Conservative

Kenneth Reginald Kowalski ECA (born September 27, 1945) is a politician and former teacher from Alberta, Canada. He was a member of the Legislative Assembly of Alberta, where he served from 1979 to 2012, sitting with the governing Progressive Conservative caucus under five different Premiers.

Kowalski was the Speaker of the Assembly, and was first appointed to the Executive Council of Alberta by Premier Don Getty in 1986. He held five different cabinet portfolios, including Deputy Premier from 1992 to 1994.

== Early life ==
Kenneth Reginald Kowalski was born in Bonnyville, Alberta on September 27, 1945. He worked as a teacher at Barrhead Composite High School, and was a civil servant in the Alberta government in the 1970s.

== Political career ==
Kowalski first ran for a seat to the Alberta Legislature in a by-election held in November 1979 in the electoral district of Barrhead to replace Hugh Horner. He ran against three other candidates including Alberta Liberal leader Nicholas Taylor. Kowalski just barely won the election with Taylor finishing a strong second. He took 38% of the popular vote to hold the seat for the Progressive Conservatives.

Kowalski faced Taylor again in the 1982 general election. Kowalski held his seat by doubling his popular vote, while Taylor only saw a marginal increase.

The 1986 election saw Kowalski re-elected by a wider margin than in 1982, with the collapse of the opposition vote. His popular vote went up by an insignificant amount. New Democrat candidate Larry McConnell finished a distant second.

After the election Premier Don Getty appointed Kowalski to the Executive Council of Alberta as Minister of the Environment. On September 8, 1988, Getty appointed him Minister of Career Development and Employment. In the 1989 general election, his popular vote in his district rose again as he defeated three other candidates including Social Credit leader Harvey Yuill.

Getty moved Kowalski to his third cabinet portfolio, the Ministry of Public Works, Supply, and Services. He kept that portfolio when Ralph Klein became Premier in 1992 and also became Deputy Premier. He held both those portfolios going into the 1993 general election. The electoral district of Barrhead was redistributed and became Barrhead-Westlock. He won the new electoral district with his highest popular vote to date in the face of a strong challenge from Liberal candidate Dale Greig and four other candidates.

Klein shuffled Kowalski to the Ministry of Economic Development and Tourism after the election, and Kowalski also remained Deputy Premier. On September 15, 1994, he became Government Leader in the legislature. Kowalski ran for his sixth term in office in the 1997 general election. For the first time in his career his popularity decreased. He defeated three candidates including Greig and Yuill to keep his seat.

Kowalski was elected Speaker of the Assembly on April 14, 1997. He defeated Don Tannas and Glen Clegg on the second ballot to win the position. The speaker's election was the first to be held by secret ballot in the assembly. In the 2001 general election, his popular vote rose significantly as he defeated three other candidates in a landslide.

After the election he was acclaimed to his second term as Speaker. He ran for his eighth term in office in the 2004 general election. His electoral district was again redistributed and he ran in the new electoral district of Barrhead-Morinville-Westlock. He won a slightly reduced popular vote, but still easily won the electoral district against four other candidates.

Kowalski was acclaimed to his third term as Speaker. He ran for his ninth term in the 2008 general election. He defeated four other candidates in a landslide to win the highest popular vote of his career.

On April 14, 2008, eleven years to the day after he won his first term as Speaker, Kowalski defeated Laurie Blakeman to remain in that position. He retired at the 2012 election.
