= Samuel Allen Carson =

Canadian politician (1870–1949)

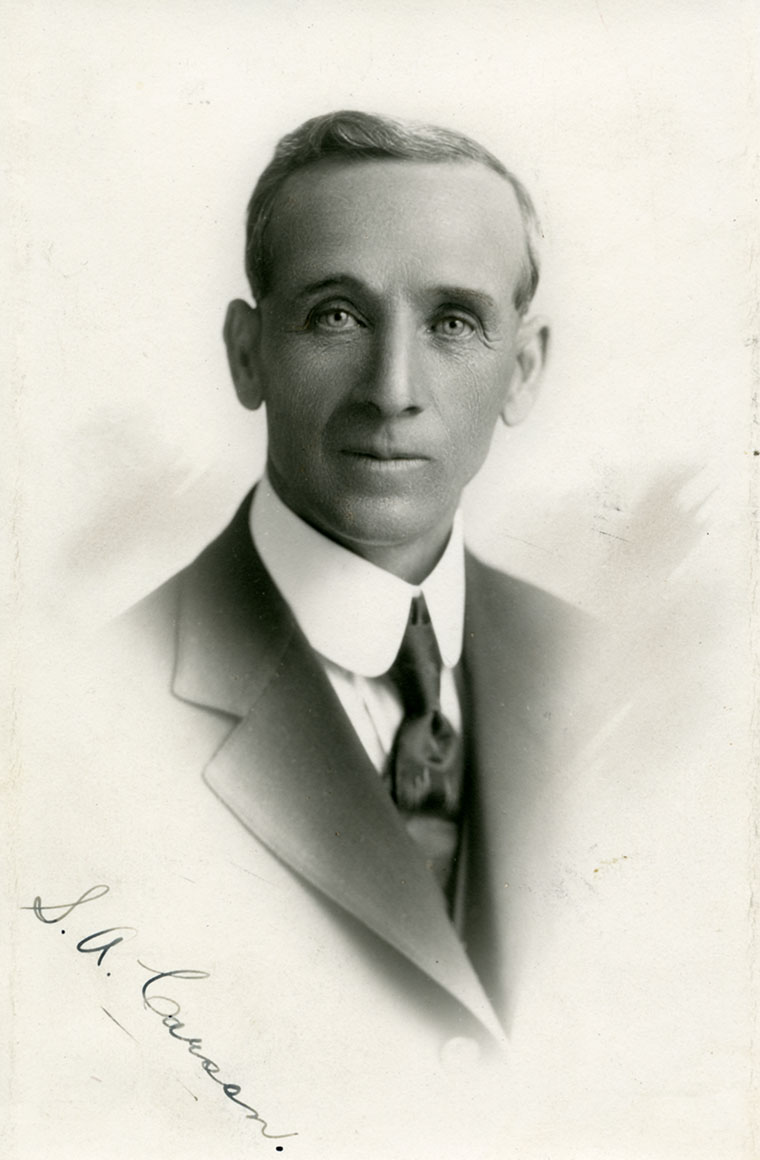

Member of the Legislative Assembly of Alberta
- In office July 18, 1921 – August 22, 1935
- Preceded by: John Boyle
- Succeeded by: James Popil
- Constituency: Sturgeon

Personal details
- Born: June 3, 1870 Vernon, Ontario
- Died: February 27, 1949 (aged 78) Namao, Alberta
- Party: United Farmers
- Occupation: politician

Samuel Allen Carson (June 3, 1870 – February 27, 1949) was a politician from Alberta, Canada. He served in the Legislative Assembly of Alberta from 1921 to 1935 as a member of the United Farmers of Alberta.

== Political career ==
Carson first ran for a seat to the Alberta Legislature in the 1921 general election as a United Farmers candidate. He defeated incumbent MLA John Boyle in the electoral district of Sturgeon. (Boyle also ran for a seat in Edmonton, which he won.)

Carson ran for a second term in the 1926 Alberta general election and easily won the three-way race as the opposition vote collapsed.

Carson ran for a third term in the 1930 Alberta general election and held his seat with a big majority over Liberal candidate John Kuzek.

Carson retired from the Legislature at dissolution in 1935.
