= George Topolnisky =

Canadian politician (1916–2012)

Member of the Legislative Assembly of Alberta
- In office 1971–1986
- Preceded by: New District
- Succeeded by: Steve Zarusky
- Constituency: Redwater-Andrew

Minister without Portfolio Responsible for rural development
- In office September 10, 1971 – March 1975

Personal details
- Born: August 13, 1916 Pakan, Alberta, Canada
- Died: March 19, 2012 (aged 95) Edmonton, Alberta, Canada
- Party: Progressive Conservative
- Occupation: Teacher

George Topolnisky (August 13, 1916 – March 19, 2012) was a provincial level politician and teacher from Alberta, Canada. He served as a member of the Legislative Assembly of Alberta from 1971 to 1986 sitting with the governing Progressive Conservative caucus. During his time in office he served as a member of the Executive Council of Alberta from 1971 to 1975 as a Minister without portfolio Responsible for rural development.

== Political career ==
Topolnisky joined the Progressive Conservatives in 1956 and became politically active in 1959 as a party organizer.

Topolnisky ran for a seat to the Alberta Legislature for the first time in the 1971 Alberta general election. He defeated incumbent Social Credit MLA Michael Senych to pick up the new electoral district of Redwater-Andrew for the Progressive Conservatives. His win helped the Progressive Conservatives gain enough seats to form government that year.

After the election Topolnisky was appointed to the Executive Council by Premier Peter Lougheed as a Minister without portfolio Responsible for rural development.

Topolnisky ran for re-election as an incumbent cabinet minister in the 1975 Alberta general election, he won a slightly higher popular vote easily keeping his seat. After the election the Premier did not renew Topolnisky's cabinet portfolio, he served in the assembly as a private member for the rest of his career.

In the run up to the 1979 general election, Topolnisky faces two challengers for the Progressive Conservative nomination in his district. He won a first ballot victory on July 13, 1978. There were over 1,000 people in attendance at the nomination meeting. In the election itself Topolnisky rolled up a slightly bigger popular vote over his 1975 result to win his third term in office.

Topolnisky would run for his fourth term in the 1982 general election. He would face a crowded field of candidates to win his highest popular vote. Michael Senych would attempt to make a comeback in that election as an Independent candidate but would be badly defeated finishing fourth. He retired from provincial politics at dissolution of the legislature in 1986.

In August 1997 George Topolnisky was awarded the Michael Luchkovich Award given annually to Albertan parliamentarians of a Ukrainian origin to honor outstanding public service.
