= Maureen Kubinec =

Canadian politician

The Honourable Maureen Kubinec ECA
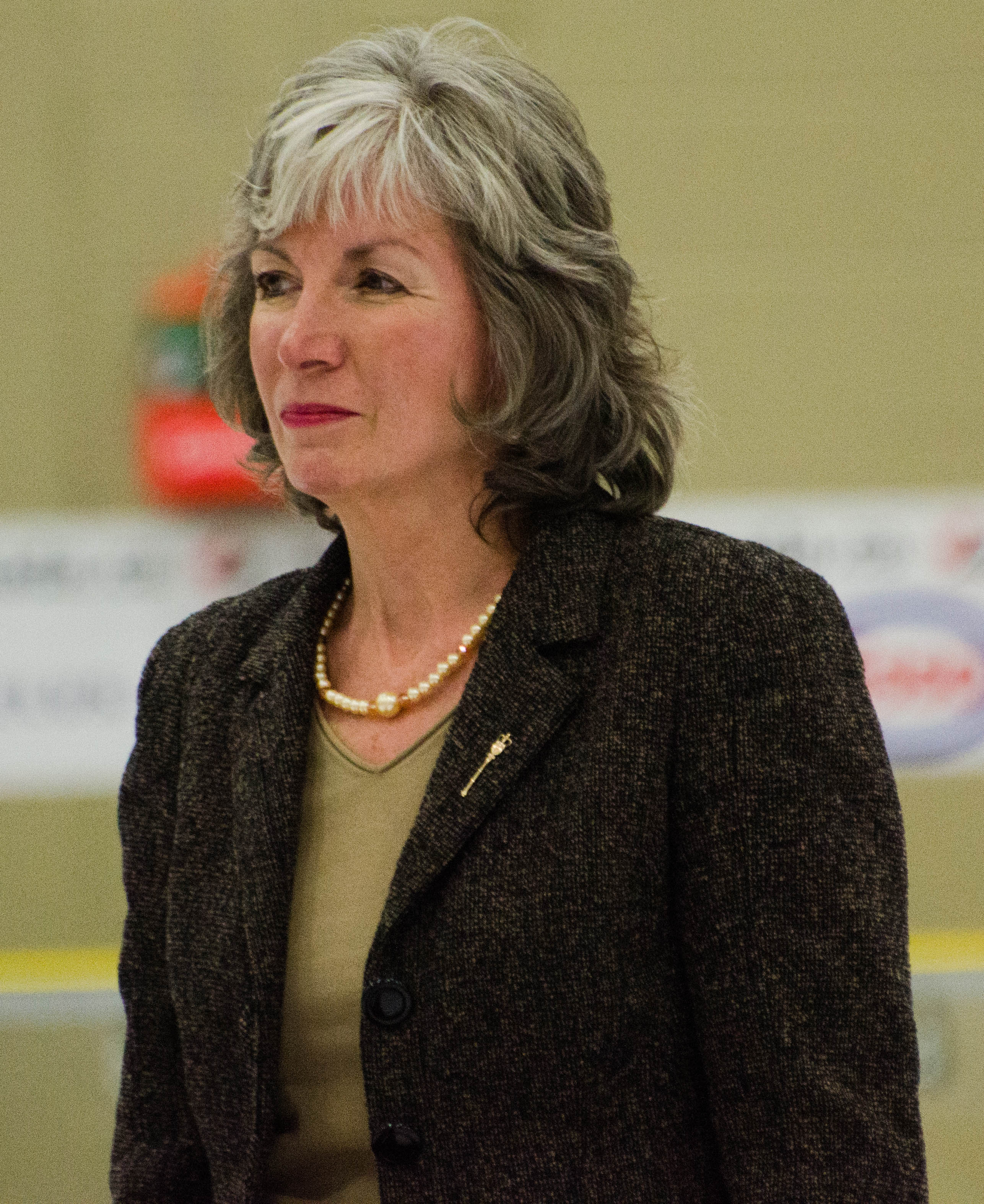
- Kubinec in 2015

MLA for Barrhead-Morinville-Westlock
- In office 2012–2015
- Preceded by: Ken Kowalski
- Succeeded by: Glenn van Dijken

Personal details
- Born: 1955 or 1956 (age 69–70) Lacombe, Alberta
- Party: Progressive Conservative

Maureen Anne Kubinec ECA (born c. 1956) is a Canadian politician. She was born in Lacombe, Alberta. She was a member to the Legislative Assembly of Alberta representing the electoral district of Barrhead-Morinville-Westlock from 2012 until she lost her seat in the 2015 provincial election. She was appointed minister of culture and tourism in the government of Jim Prentice in 2014.
