= Sturgeon (provincial electoral district) =

Defunct provincial electoral district in Alberta, Canada

Coordinates: 54.0°N 113.5°W

Alberta electoral district

Defunct provincial electoral district
- Legislature: Legislative Assembly of Alberta
- District created: 1905
- District abolished: 1940
- First contested: 1905
- Last contested: 1935

Sturgeon was a provincial electoral district in Alberta, Canada, mandated to return a single member to the Legislative Assembly of Alberta from 1905 to 1940.

== History ==
=== Members of the Legislative Assembly (MLAs) ===
Members of the Legislative Assembly for Sturgeon
Assembly	Years	Member	Party
1st	1905–1909	John Robert Boyle	Liberal
2nd	1909–1913	John Robert Boyle	Liberal
3rd	1913–1917	John Robert Boyle	Liberal
4th	1917–1921	John Robert Boyle	Liberal
5th	1921–1926	Samuel Allen Carson	United Farmers
6th	1926–1930	Samuel Allen Carson	United Farmers
7th	1930–1935	Samuel Allen Carson	United Farmers
8th	1935–1940	James Popil	Social Credit
See Redwater electoral district from 1940 to 1971 and St. Albert electoral district from 1940-present

== Election results ==
=== 1905 ===
Returning Officer
Francis B. Webb

1905 Alberta general election
Party	Candidate	Votes	%	±%
Liberal	John Robert Boyle	625	67.13%	–
Conservative	Frank Knight	306	32.87%	–
Total		931	–	–
Rejected, spoiled and declined		N/A	–	–
Eligible electors / turnout		939	99.15%	–
Liberal pickup new district.				
Source(s) Source: "Sturgeon Official Results 1905 Alberta general election". Alberta Heritage Community Foundation.

=== 1909 ===
1909 Alberta general election
Party	Candidate	Votes	%	±%
Liberal	John Robert Boyle	Acclaimed	–	–
Total		N/A	–	–
Rejected, spoiled and declined		N/A	–	–
Eligible electors / turnout		N/A	N/A	–
Liberal pickup new district.				
Source(s) Source: "Sturgeon Official Results 1909 Alberta general election". Alberta Heritage Community Foundation.

=== 1912 by-election ===
Alberta provincial by-election, May 27, 1912 Ministerial by-election upon John Robert Boyle's appointment as Minister of Education
Party	Candidate	Votes	%	±%
Liberal	John Robert Boyle	1,173	66.08%	–
Conservative	A. W. Taylor	602	33.92%	–
Total		1,775	–	–
Rejected, spoiled and declined		N/A	–	–
Eligible electors / turnout		N/A	N/A	–
Liberal hold		Swing		–
Source(s) "By-elections". elections.ab.ca. Elections Alberta.

=== 1913 ===
1913 Alberta general election
Party	Candidate	Votes	%	±%
Liberal	John Robert Boyle	936	62.73%	–
Conservative	James Hyndman	556	37.27%	–
Total		1,492	–	–
Rejected, spoiled and declined		N/A	–	–
Eligible electors / turnout		2,134	69.92%	N/A
Liberal hold		Swing		N/A
Source(s) Source: "Sturgeon Official Results 1913 Alberta general election". Alberta Heritage Community Foundation.

=== 1917 ===
1917 Alberta general election
Party	Candidate	Votes	%	±%
Liberal	John Robert Boyle	1,546	47.19%	-15.54%
Conservative	J. Sutherland	1,212	37.00%	-0.27%
Independent	H. Mickleson	518	15.81%	–
Total		3,276	–	–
Rejected, spoiled and declined		N/A	–	–
Eligible electors / turnout		3,505	93.47%	N/A
Liberal hold		Swing		-7.64%
Source(s) Source: "Sturgeon Official Results 1917 Alberta general election". Alberta Heritage Community Foundation.

=== 1921 ===
1921 Alberta general election
Party	Candidate	Votes	%	±%
United Farmers	Samuel Allen Carson	2,815	59.09%	–
Liberal	John Robert Boyle	1,949	40.91%	-6.28%
Total		4,764	–	–
Rejected, spoiled and declined		N/A	–	–
Eligible electors / turnout		6,299	75.63%	-17.94%
United Farmers gain from Liberal		Swing		3.99%
Source(s) Source: "Sturgeon Official Results 1921 Alberta general election". Alberta Heritage Community Foundation.

=== 1926 ===
1926 Alberta general election
Party	Candidate	Votes	%	±%
United Farmers	Samuel Allen Carson	2,556	62.99%	3.90%
Liberal	G. J. Hope	1,154	28.44%	-12.47%
Conservative	J. E. Holmes	348	8.58%	–
Total		4,058	–	–
Rejected, spoiled and declined		269	–	–
Eligible electors / turnout		6,264	69.08%	-6.55%
United Farmers hold		Swing		8.19%
Source(s) Source: "Sturgeon Official Results 1926 Alberta general election". Alberta Heritage Community Foundation.

=== 1930 ===
1930 Alberta general election
Party	Candidate	Votes	%	±%
United Farmers	Samuel Allen Carson	2,556	69.36%	6.38%
Liberal	John Kuzek	1,129	30.64%	2.20%
Total		3,685	–	–
Rejected, spoiled and declined		157	–	–
Eligible electors / turnout		6,099	62.99%	-6.08%
United Farmers hold		Swing		2.09%
Source(s) Source: "Sturgeon Official Results 1930 Alberta general election". Alberta Heritage Community Foundation.

=== 1935 ===
1935 Alberta general election
Party	Candidate	Votes	%	±%
First count
Social Credit	James Popil	2,465	42.68%	–
Liberal	G. J. Hope	1,533	26.54%	-4.10%
United Farmers	John Russell Love	857	14.84%	-54.52%
United Front	L. Robbins	560	9.70%	–
Conservative	G. G. Fowler	361	6.25%	–
Total		5,776	–	–
Ballot transfer results
Social Credit	James Popil	2,729	57.07%	–
Liberal	G. J. Hope	2,053	42.93%	–
No second choice		994	–	–
Total		4,782	–	–
Rejected, spoiled and declined		222	–	–
Eligible electors / turnout		7,425	80.78%	17.79%
Social Credit gain from United Farmers		Swing		-11.29%
Source(s) Source: "Sturgeon Official Results 1935 Alberta general election". Alberta Heritage Community Foundation. Instant-runoff voting requires a candidate to receive a plurality (greater than 50%) of the votes. As no candidate received a plurality of votes, the bottom candidate was eliminated and their 2nd place votes were applied to both other candidates until one received a plurality

== See also ==
- List of Alberta provincial electoral districts
- Canadian provincial electoral districts
