= Peter Chaba =

Canadian politician

Member of the Legislative Assembly of Alberta
- In office 1948–1955
- Preceded by: James Popil
- Succeeded by: Alfred Macyk
- Constituency: Redwater

Personal details
- Born: May 23, 1903 Velyki Chornokintsi, Austria-Hungary
- Died: March 29, 1964 (aged 60) Redwater, Alberta, Canada
- Party: Social Credit

Peter Chaba (May 23, 1903 – March 29, 1964) was a provincial politician from Alberta, Canada. He served as a member of the Legislative Assembly of Alberta from 1948 to 1955, sitting with the Social Credit caucus in government.
