= Martha Bielish =

Canadian politician

The Honourable Martha P. Bielish

Canadian Senator from Alberta
- In office September 27, 1979 – September 26, 1990

Personal details
- Born: Martha Palamarek; October 20, 1915 Smoky Lake, Alberta, Canada
- Died: May 18, 2010 (aged 94) Edmonton, Alberta, Canada
- Party: Progressive Conservative
- Spouse: Joseph Bielish (m. 1936)
- Children: 1
- Education: University of Alberta
- Occupation: Politician; teacher; farmer

Martha Palamarek Bielish (October 20, 1915 – May 18, 2010) was a politician, farmer, feminist, and teacher from Alberta, Canada. She served in the Senate of Canada as a member of the Progressive Conservative caucus from 1979 to 1990.

== Early life ==
Bielish was born in 1915 in Smoky Lake, Alberta. She served in politics on the municipal level as an elected School Trustee.

Bielish ran for a seat to the Legislative Assembly of Alberta in the 1959 Alberta general election as a Progressive Conservative candidate in the electoral district of Redwater. She finished a distant third place in the three-way race behind Social Credit candidate John Dubetz and incumbent MLA Alfred Macyk.

In 1965 she became president of the Alberta's Women's Institute.

== Senate career ==
Bielish was appointed to the Senate of Canada on the advice of Joe Clark on September 27, 1979 and served until mandatory retirement on September 26, 1990. She was the first Ukrainian-Canadian woman to sit in the Senate.
