= Westlock-Sturgeon =

Defunct provincial electoral district in Alberta, Canada

Alberta electoral district

Defunct provincial electoral district
- Legislature: Legislative Assembly of Alberta
- District created: 1986
- District abolished: 1993
- First contested: 1986
- Last contested: 1989

Westlock-Sturgeon was a provincial electoral district in Alberta, Canada, mandated to return a single member to the Legislative Assembly of Alberta using first-past-the-post balloting from 1986 to 1993.

== History ==
=== Boundary history ===
Members of the Legislative Assembly
Assembly	Years	Member	Party
See Athabasca 1905–1986, Redwater-Andrew; 1971–1986, and St. Albert 1905–1986.
21st	1986-1989	Nicholas Taylor	Liberal
22nd	1989–1993	Nicholas Taylor	Liberal
See Barrhead-Westlock 1993–2004, Redwater; 1993–2004, and Spruce Grove-Sturgeon-St. Albert 1993–2012

The riding was created for the 1986 election from parts of three ridings: the town of Westlock was transferred from Athabasca, while the part of Sturgeon County around Morinville was transferred from St. Albert, along with a small part of Redwater-Andrew.

The riding was abolished only seven years later at the next redistribution. The northern half of the riding was transferred to Barrhead-Westlock, with Morinville and the area east of it going to Redwater and the remainder to Spruce Grove-Sturgeon-St. Albert.

=== Representation history ===
The riding's only MLA was Nicholas Taylor, who had led the Liberal Party through its decade-long drought. His election in 1986, along with three other Liberals in Edmonton and Calgary, was a breakthrough for the party.

He was replaced by Laurence Decore as party leader only two years later, but was re-elected in Westlock-Sturgeon in 1989. For the second term in a row, Taylor was the only Liberal MLA in rural Alberta. When the riding was abolished in 1993, he went on to serve as MLA for Redwater.

== Election results ==
=== 1986 ===
1986 Alberta general election
Party	Candidate	Votes	%	±%
Liberal	Nicholas Taylor	4,523	38.95%	–
Progressive Conservative	Lawrence Kluthe	4,049	34.87%	–
New Democratic	Bruce Lennon	1,996	17.19%	–
Representative	Tom Carleton	911	7.84%	–
Confederation of Regions	Adam Hauch	78	0.67%	–
Communist	Laurent St. Denis	29	0.25%	–
Heritage	Stan Pearson	25	0.22%	–
Total valid votes		11,611	–	–
Rejected, spoiled and declined		12	–	–
Registered electors / turnout		18,572	62.58%	–
Liberal pickup new district.				
Source(s) Source: "Westlock-Sturgeon Official Results 1986 Alberta general election". Alberta Heritage Community Foundation.

=== 1989 ===
1989 Alberta general election
Party	Candidate	Votes	%	±%
Liberal	Nicholas Taylor	5,401	44.80%	+5.85%
Progressive Conservative	Leo Seguin	4,958	41.13%	+6.26%
New Democratic	Tom Turner	1,696	14.07%	-3.12%
Total valid votes		12,055	–	–
Rejected, spoiled and declined		15	–	–
Registered electors / turnout		19,662	61.38%	-1.20%
Liberal hold		Swing		-0.21%
Source(s) Source: "Westlock-Sturgeon Official Results 1989 Alberta general election". Alberta Heritage Community Foundation.

== See also ==
- List of Alberta provincial electoral districts
- Canadian provincial electoral districts
