= Distributed learning =

Non-centralised form of instruction

Distributed learning is an instructional model that allows instructor, students, and content to be located in different, noncentralized locations so that instruction and learning can occur independent of time and place. The distributed learning model can be used in combination with traditional classroom-based courses and traditional distance education courses (in which it is also deferred to as blended learning, or it can be used to create entirely virtual classrooms.)

There is much confusion globally over distinctions between and definitions of distributed learning, distance education, open learning, e-learning, blended learning and other related terms. Many terms are used more commonly in particular geographies. Distinctions can arise when the chosen model focuses on either or both time and geographic distances. Distributed learning may be dependent on time if it includes synchronous sessions, and further time dependent if the course is paced. The oldest and most commonly used of these terms, distance education, can be used to describe distributed learning as defined above. "Distributed education" lacks a correspondence school tone and history and thus is perceived as making more use of communications and especially synchronous communications technologies. Further research using both terms "distance" and "distributed education" returns better results, with considerable overlap.

== History ==
The term "distributed learning" is closely associated with the Canadian province of British Columbia, where kindergarten-to-grade-12 distance education began around 1919, initially delivered by correspondence course. British Columbia was also the site of Canada's first online K-12 learning programs, which emerged in the mid-1990s. The province's Ministry of Education later formalized "distributed learning" as an official term for these programs, and distributed learning schools in British Columbia have operated under provincial quality-assurance agreements since 2006.

Distributed learning is a viable option for many individuals of all ages who desire to get an education. It holds a number of advantages and a traditional learning environment.

== Advantages ==
1. Opportunities to study
2. Networking
3. Pace
4. Schedules
5. Money
6. Travelling
7. Selection of Professors
8. Numerous choices for schools
9. No classroom setting
10. Effective
11. Learning while working
12. Flexibility
13. Cost-effectiveness
14. Advanced technology
15. In-person connections
16. International Networking

== Disadvantages ==
1. Format is not always ideal for all learners
2. Some employers do not accept online degrees
3. Requires adaptability to new technologies
4. Not all courses required to complete the degree may be offered online
5. Lack of motivation
6. Can not generate as an alternate learning method
7. Distributed learning may not offer immediate feedback
8. Distributed learning does not always offer all the necessary courses online
9. Internet availability and affordability.
10. Distributed learning delivered as programmed instruction:
  1. Lack of social interaction
  2. No interaction with teachers and professors
  3. Lack of seriousness, competition and learning environment
  4. Programmed instruction may be isolated & separated from daily practice
  5. Programmed instruction does not give opportunity to work on oral communication skills
  6. Absence of a teacher or an instructor

== Collaboration ==
Distributed learning relies on collaboration to share knowledge.

== Technology ==
Distributed learning relies on technology to share, store, retrieve, and extend knowledge.

== Distributed cognition ==
Distributed cognition is an outcome of distributed learning (Mindmaps, 2015).
