= James Popil =

Canadian politician (1909-1978)

James Michael Popil
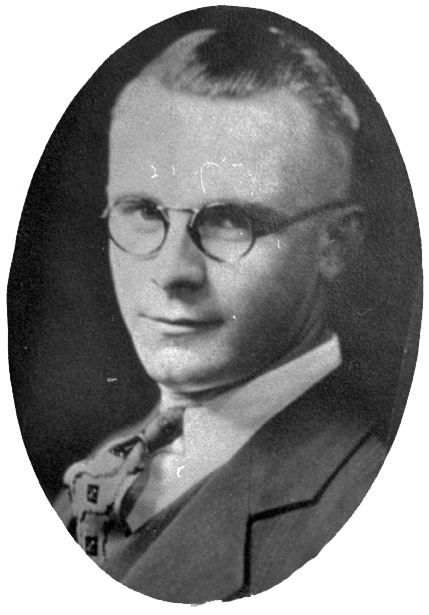

Member of the Legislative Assembly of Alberta
- In office August 22, 1935 – March 21, 1940
- Preceded by: Samuel Carson
- Succeeded by: District abolished
- Constituency: Sturgeon
- In office March 21, 1940 – August 17, 1948
- Preceded by: New district
- Succeeded by: Peter Chaba
- Constituency: Redwater

Personal details
- Born: November 5, 1909 Redwater, Alberta, Canada
- Died: August 14, 1978 (aged 68) Edmonton, Alberta, Canada
- Party: Social Credit
- Occupation: politician

James Michael Popil (November 5, 1909 – August 14, 1978) was a politician from Alberta, Canada. He served in the Legislative Assembly of Alberta from 1935 to 1948 as a member of the Social Credit caucus in government.

== Political career ==
Popil first ran for public office as a Social Credit candidate in the 1935 Alberta general election. He defeated incumbent cabinet minister John Love and four other candidates on ballot transfers in the electoral district of Sturgeon.

After Sturgeon was abolished in the 1940 boundary redistribution, Popil ran for a second term in office in the new Redwater electoral district in the election held that year. He won with a substantial first ballot majority over two other candidates.

Popil ran for his third and final term in office in the 1944 general election. He marginally increased his popular vote and won a big majority to hold his seat. He retired from provincial politics at dissolution of the assembly in 1948.
