= Barrhead, Alberta =

Barrhead
- Town
- Town of Barrhead
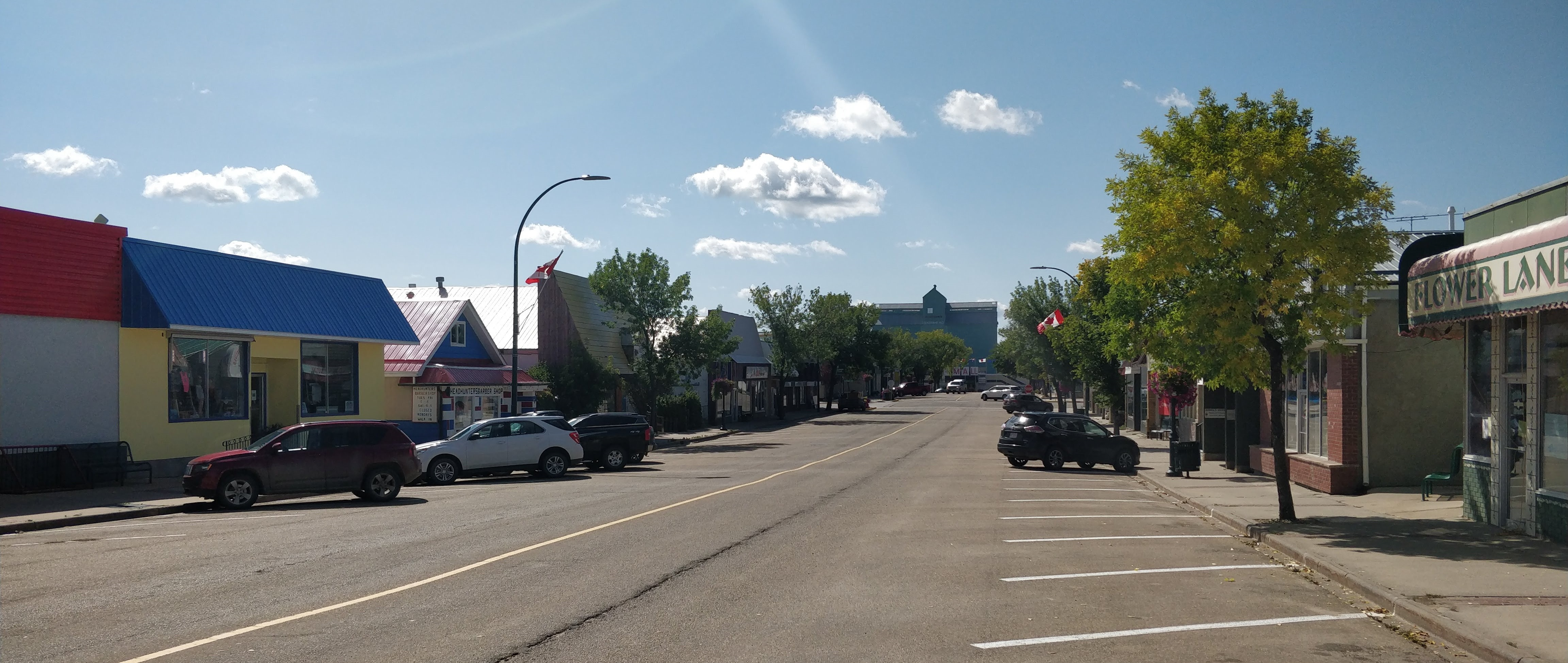
- 50th Street

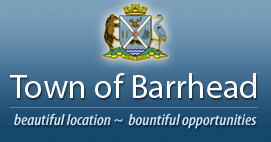
- Flag Masthead logo
- Motto: "A quality community with a quality lifestyle"
- Town boundaries

- Location in the County of Barrhead Location in Alberta Barrhead (Canada) Barrhead (North America)
- Coordinates: 54°07′23″N 114°24′07″W
- Country: Canada
- Province: Alberta
- Planning region: Upper Athabasca
- Municipal district: County of Barrhead No. 11
- Incorporated
  - Village: November 14, 1927
  - Town: November 26, 1946

Government
  - Mayor: Ty Assaf
  - Governing body: Barrhead Town Council
  - MP: Arnold Viersen
  - MLA: Glenn van Dijken

Area (2021)
  - Land: 8.2 km^{2} (3.2 sq mi)
- Elevation: 645 m (2,116 ft)

Population (2021)
  - Total: 4,320
  - Density: 527.1/km^{2} (1,365/sq mi)
- Time zone: UTC−06:00 (Alberta Time)
- Forward sortation area: T7N
- Area code: 780
- Highways: Highway 18; Highway 33
- Waterway: Paddle River
- Website: Official website

Barrhead /ˈbɑːrhɛd/ is a town in central Alberta, Canada that is surrounded by the County of Barrhead No. 11. It is located along the Paddle River and at the intersection of Highway 33 (Grizzly Trail) and Highway 18, approximately 120 km (75 mi) northwest of the City of Edmonton. It is also located along the route of the Express Trail, used by the North West Company, which was originally a First Nations trail. The trail was later widened by George Simpson and John Rowand to save the North West Company over $5,000.

The town was named after the Scottish town Barrhead, the birthplace of one of the children of the area's early settlers, James McGuire. Barrhead's official bird is the great blue heron.

== History ==
During the late 19th century and the early 20th century, Barrhead played an important role in the settlement of northwest Alberta. Highway 33, known as the Grizzly Trail, follows the original Klondike Trail, which was the shortest route to the Yukon during the Gold Rush years. Once established, this route was key to the settlement of the Peace River region. The old Barrhead town site, 3 km north of the present Town Centre, was a frequent stop over for the few Klondikers and others who needed supplies for the rigorous journey north.

Originally established in 1906, Barrhead's position as a major trade centre on the historic Klondike Trail gave it a significant role in the settlement of north-western Alberta. It was a vital link in the trade route from Fort Edmonton to the Yukon. James McGuire, the child of one of the first settlers in the area, named Barrhead after his hometown in Scotland. Today, the community's rich history can be revisited through a collection of artifacts at the Barrhead and District Museum. The museum also houses a large display of African taxidermy, as well as the Barrhead Visitor Information Centre, which is open from May to September. The great blue heron is another prominent figure in local lore, is often spotted along the shores of the Paddle River and local lakes, and is the town's official animal. A statue of the bird is situated next to the Community Gazebo that marks the town centre and miniatures of the bird adorn the street posts.

The area was a quiet land of rolling hills well covered with stands of poplar, birch, pine and spruce trees on the higher ground with the low areas filled with willow and tamarack. The area has always been sparsely populated, with Cree natives passing through the region for the last 5000 years mainly settling around the different lakes in the region (such as Shoal Lake). In 1810 a First Nations trail was explored by David Thompson to connect the North Saskatchewan with Athabasca Pass, creating the first Canadian Transcontinental connection. In 1811 the first letter ever delivered from British Columbia to Montreal passed through this trail and its importance as a communication and trade route began to grow. In 1824, at the request of Gov. George Simpson the trail was widened from Fort Assiniboine to Fort Edmonton passing one mile (1.6 km) east of the present town, to accommodate the increased traffic along to route (as many as 75 horses or more a day). Some of the larger pack trains had over a hundred head of horses. The Cree natives and trappers moved across the area as they went about their business. As the First Nations peoples trapped a greater number of beavers and broke a number of dams the Klondike trial became flooded and partially abandoned until 1898. During the gold rush some Klondikers attempted to use the trail, although most preferred the drier route that was established heading up to Athabasca Landing. The pack-trail was widened to allow teams of horses and wagons, loaded high with provisions, to carry gold seekers north. Homesteaders soon followed. Surveys of the land took place in 1906 and 1907 and the pioneers applied for quarters (160 acres) of land. Trading posts were busy on both the Pembina and Athabasca rivers. A small store in the log home of Percy and Mary Johnstone (2 miles north and 1-mile (1.6 km) east of town) was in operation. Andy Tuttle lived 1.5 miles (2.4 km) to the south and helped many settlers as they arrived.

A post office named Paddle River was opened on Ted Speck's farm, one mile (1.6 km) southeast of town on the south side of the river in 1907. A store in Josh Cason's house, south and west of town, was operating in 1908 and a lean-to on the side provided a room for a school. Hugh Critchlow had taken land a mile north of Specks', along the Klondike Trail in 1907. Soon the Speck brothers (Ted and Fred) had built a bridge across the river and a sawmill was in operation on the north side. Cason and Critchlow partnered to build a store at Critchlow's in 1910 and the post office was moved there. A hall had been built just across the trail where school was held from 1909 to 1911. A blacksmith shop and a merry-go-round type swing completed the busy centre where nearly a hundred people attended the picnic in 1909. Rev. Seymour Dallas applied for a ten-acre cemetery plot (which is currently East Lawn Community Cemetery) and in 1913 the Anglican Church was built there. The church was subsequently moved to town in 1928 and then moved to Thunder Lake in 1967.

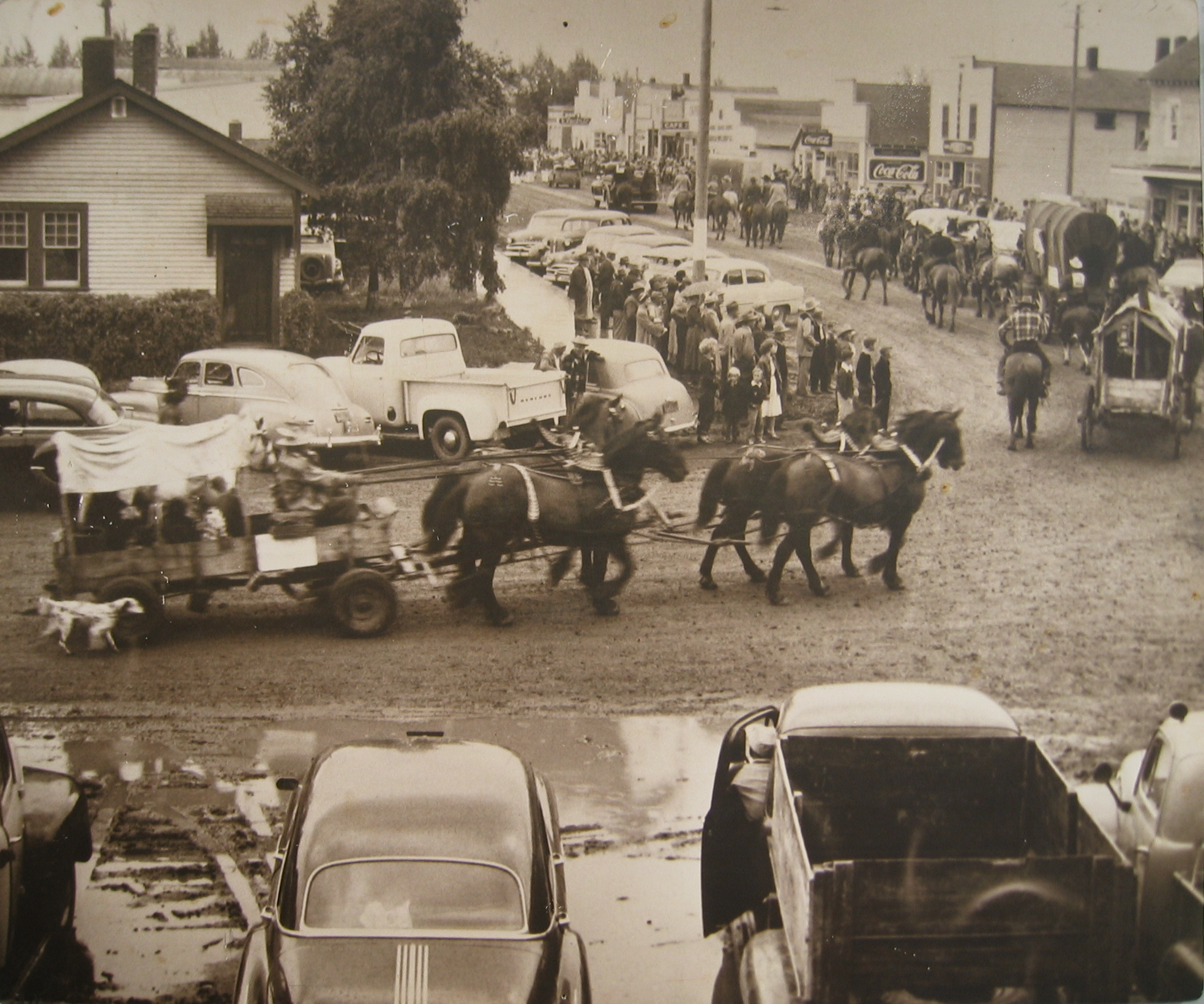
Main Street, Barrhead

The Paddle River Co-operative Society was formed in 1912 and opened a store in the old Johnstone building northeast of Barrhead in 1913. They immediately began construction on a new two-story building that would have room for community gatherings upstairs. Application was made for a post office, which required that they choose a name. The McGuire family suggested the name of their home town in Scotland and soon the Barrhead, Alberta, post office opened in the store on January 1, 1914.

The Finch family built a stopping house which still stands nearby. The North-West Mounted Police built a barracks and the hall was moved over from the southern location (2.5 miles). A blacksmith shop and a garage were built on the other corner of the intersection and various families bought lots and built homes. The bus service to Edmonton was started in 1926 and the Toronto Dominion/TD Canada Trust bank was opened in the stopping house. The children went to school at Glenreagh, two miles (3 km) west. The community applied to have the railway brought here from Busby and landowners hoped to sell right-of-way.

In 1907, Albert Shelton and family homesteaded the quarter that Barrhead's main street is on. He built a house, barn, dug a well and did some fencing, mostly in the northeast corner of the quarter, the highest area of land. The Sheltons moved away in 1912 leaving the quarter vacant and by 1927 the land was cheap so the Northern Alberta Railways agreed to bring the Pembina Valley branch line to this quarter. The Barrhead people then scrambled to move their homes, the garage and the store to this new location, where four elevators were already being built. The pattern of the streets and lots were carefully laid in relation to the railway tracks and buildings went up in rapid succession. The pattern chosen for the lots is still used today. In no time at all, businesses were in operation; from grocery and hardware stores, a drug store, restaurant, hotel, real estate office, butcher shop, livery barn, etc. to another, which was the United Church. Ted Hooper supplied electric lights. The incorporation of the village took place in November 1927. A seven- or eight-bed hospital opened that fall on the corner of 49A Street and Railroad Avenue. A new hospital was built across the main road (Highway 33) in 1934.

The school was built and opened in 1928; a two-room building that needed another building for the High School by 1929. Around this time, heavy immigration started to occur from Germany. The town newspaper, the Barrhead News was printing in 1927 and soon was called the Barrhead Leader, the present day newspaper. In 1936, the curling rink was established plus William Johnson became the village constable. The movie theatre opened in 1939. In 1946, the village borrowed money to install water and sewer and that year on November 26 Barrhead became a town. Since then, the town has continued to grow and become continually more prosperous.

== Geography ==
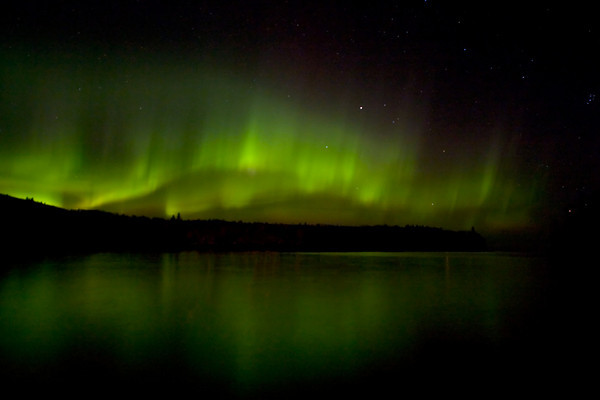
Aurora Borealis overhead Thunder Lake Provincial Park

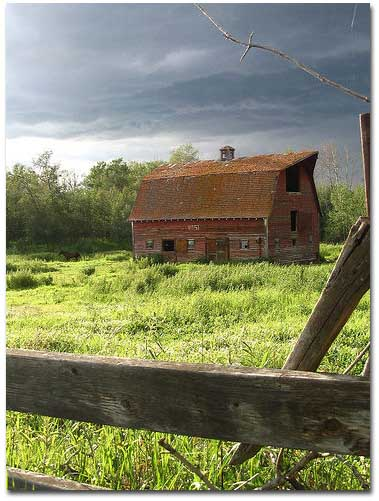
Example of the countryside around Barrhead

The area contains dense stands of spruce, birch, pine and poplar. It also has some of the most fertile farmland in the province and is located between two major rivers, the Athabasca River and Pembina River. The Paddle River, a tributary of the Pembina River, flows directly through the town Barrhead. If you go south and east of town there are low flatlands and river-lands, and to the west of town there is the area's main recreational area, Thunder Lake Provincial Park, approximately 16 kilometres (9.9 mi) west of the town. Thunder Lake is very popular for boating, fishing and camping and is home to many residents from other areas of the province during the summer months. The northern parts of the Barrhead region contain thick stands of spruce, pine and tamarack. Throughout the county of Barrhead there are also numerous lakes besides just Thunder Lake Provincial Park that are great for camping and fishing. There is also a local ski hill with good elevation on the Athabasca River valley.

Wildlife in the Barrhead area include deer, western moose, coyote, black bear, grizzly bear, North American cougar, northwestern wolves and the county emblem the great blue heron.

=== Climate ===
The town has a borderline humid continental (Köppen Dfb)/subarctic (Dfc) climate. Barrhead lies in USDA Plant Hardiness Zone 3a) and is characterised by pleasant summers and frigid winters. There are four distinct seasons. Temperatures reach upwards of 35 °C or 95 °F during June, July, and August and can drop as low as −50 °C or −58 °F, though like all of Alberta winters are extremely variable from year to year. Rainfall is moderate, with the majority falling during the summer months. The area is noticeably wetter than in surrounding regions, particularly to the south and east. Around a metre of snow falls on the region during winter. During the summer solstice, twilight extends throughout the night and during the winter, night comes quickly. However, the town gets to experience beautiful displays of the Aurora borealis and this helps with the dark.

Climate data for Barrhead
Month	Jan	Feb	Mar	Apr	May	Jun	Jul	Aug	Sep	Oct	Nov	Dec	Year
Record high °C (°F)	15 (59)	25.5 (77.9)	20.6 (69.1)	29.4 (84.9)	33.3 (91.9)	37.8 (100.0)	37.2 (99.0)	35 (95)	32 (90)	30 (86)	22.2 (72.0)	16 (61)	37.8 (100.0)
Mean daily maximum °C (°F)	−8.2 (17.2)	−3.6 (25.5)	2.4 (36.3)	11 (52)	17.6 (63.7)	20.7 (69.3)	22.6 (72.7)	21.7 (71.1)	16.4 (61.5)	10.4 (50.7)	−0.8 (30.6)	−6.6 (20.1)	8.6 (47.5)
Mean daily minimum °C (°F)	−20.6 (−5.1)	−17.4 (0.7)	−10.5 (13.1)	−3.1 (26.4)	2.4 (36.3)	6.9 (44.4)	9.1 (48.4)	7.8 (46.0)	2.6 (36.7)	−2.7 (27.1)	−11.4 (11.5)	−18.3 (−0.9)	−4.6 (23.7)
Record low °C (°F)	−51.7 (−61.1)	−50.6 (−59.1)	−43.9 (−47.0)	−32.2 (−26.0)	−12.2 (10.0)	−7.8 (18.0)	−2.8 (27.0)	−5 (23)	−17.2 (1.0)	−28 (−18)	−45.6 (−50.1)	−51.7 (−61.1)	−51.7 (−61.1)
Average precipitation mm (inches)	18.6 (0.73)	15.5 (0.61)	16.1 (0.63)	24 (0.9)	48.9 (1.93)	105.3 (4.15)	118.7 (4.67)	83.2 (3.28)	44 (1.7)	16.9 (0.67)	18.6 (0.73)	23.4 (0.92)	533.1 (20.99)
Source: Environment Canada

== Demographics ==
In the 2021 Census of Population conducted by Statistics Canada, the Town of Barrhead had a population of 4,320 living in 1,833 of its 1,983 total private dwellings, a change of −5.7% from its 2016 population of 4,579. With a land area of 8.2 km^{2} (3.2 sq mi), it had a population density of 526.8/km^{2} (1,364.5/sq mi) in 2021.

In the 2016 Census of Population conducted by Statistics Canada, the Town of Barrhead recorded a population of 4,579 living in 1,912 of its 2,009 total private dwellings, a 3.3% change from its 2011 population of 4,432. With a land area of 8.17 km^{2} (3.15 sq mi), it had a population density of 560.5/km^{2} (1,451.6/sq mi) in 2016.

== Economy ==
The major industries that support Barrhead's economy are oil and gas, forestry, and agriculture. Dairy, sheep, livestock, wheat, and fruit crops are examples of the types of agricultural activities in the area.

Barrhead is home to a facility of Pollard Banknote Ltd., a supplier of scratch-off and pull-tab instant tickets, ticket vending machines, and bingo supplies. The town is also home to a modular housing plant.

== Infrastructure ==
The town houses the province's correspondence school, which in 1991 was renamed the Alberta Distance Learning Centre.

== Government ==
=== Municipal government ===
The current mayor is Ty Assaf. The town council consists of six councillors and a mayor, which are elected every four years.

=== Federal government ===
Barrhead is currently in the Peace River—Westlock federal electoral district represented by MP Arnold Viersen.

=== Provincial government ===
Barrhead is currently in the Athabasca-Barrhead-Westlock provincial electoral district represented by MLA Glenn van Dijken.

== Education ==
The town is within the Pembina Hills Public Schools Division, which formed in 1995 as a merger of three school districts. Barrhead Composite High School (winners of the Reach for the Top national championship in 1973) serves the community. Ecole Barrhead Elementary School is an elementary school in Barrhead, Alberta that offers prep to grade six, and includes a small French immersion option.

== Sports ==
Barrhead is home to a junior ice hockey team in Western States Hockey League announced to start playing in 2019–20 season.

== Sister cities ==
Barrhead is twinned with:

- Drouin, Victoria, Australia
- Tokoro, Hokkaido, Japan
- Chapala, Jalisco, Mexico

== Notable people ==
- Doug Horner, former Deputy Premier of Alberta
- Leland Irving, ice hockey player for the Jokerit of the Liiga in Finland
- Janis Irwin, Canadian politician, Alberta NDP MLA for Edmonton-Highlands-Norwood (2019 – )
- Ken Kowalski, former Speaker of the Alberta Legislative Assembly, MLA and former deputy Premier (past resident)
- Melissa Lotholz, Olympic athlete on Canadian Two-Woman Bobsled team, competed at 2018 Winter Olympics in Pyeongchang, South Korea
- Alan May, former NHL player, current hockey analyst on NBC Sports Washington
- Brian Storseth, former Member of Parliament for Westlock-St. Paul (past resident)
- Arnold Viersen, Canadian politician, Conservative Member of Parliament (2015 – )
- Charles Yuill (August 14, 1889 – July 30, 1972) was a former mayor of Barrhead, Alberta and served as an MP for Jasper-Edson 1953 to 1958.
