= Smoky Lake =

- Town
- Town of Smoky Lake
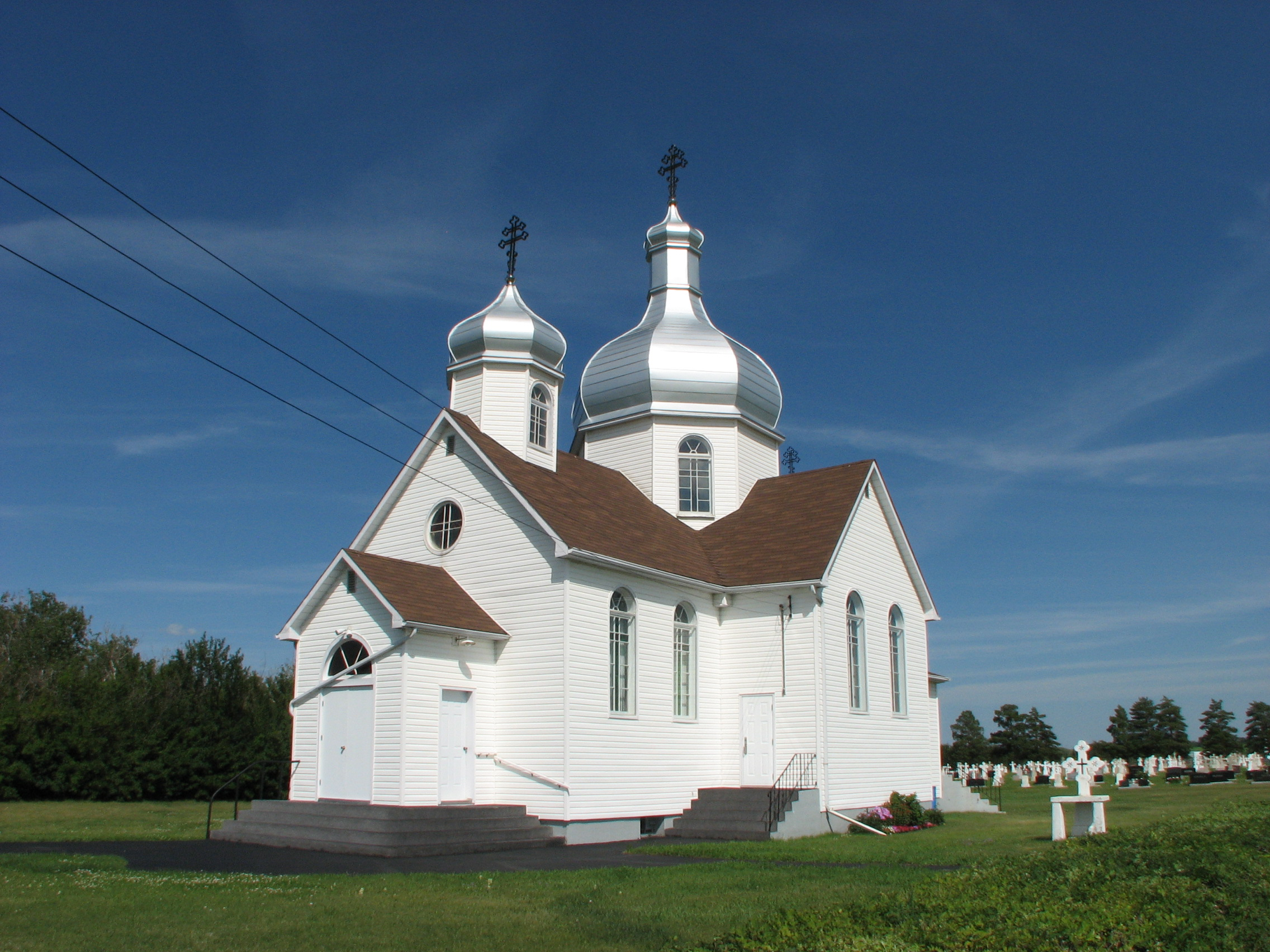
- Holy Trinity Orthodox Church
- Motto: Pumpkin Capital of Alberta
- Location of Smoky Lake in Alberta Smoky Lake (Canada)
- Coordinates: 54°07′15″N 112°28′24″W
- Country: Canada
- Province: Alberta
- Region: Central Alberta
- Census division: 12
- Municipal district: Smoky Lake County
- Incorporated
  - Village: March 26, 1923
  - Town: February 1, 1962

Government
  - Mayor: Amy Cherniwchan
  - Governing body: Smoky Lake Town Council: Evelynne Kobes; Terry Makowichuk; Mel Morton; Marianne Prockiw-Zarusky
  - MP: Shannon Stubbs
  - MLA: Glenn van Dijken

Area (2021)
  - Land: 4.26 km^{2} (1.64 sq mi)
- Elevation: 623 m (2,044 ft)

Population (2021)
  - Total: 1,031
- Time zone: UTC−06:00 (Alberta Time)
- Highways: Highway 28; Highway 855
- Waterway: North Saskatchewan River; Smoky Lake
- Website: Official website

Smoky Lake is a town in Central Alberta, Canada. It is located 116 km (72 mi) northeast of Edmonton at the junction of Highway 28 and Highway 855. It lies between the North Saskatchewan River, Smoky Creek, and White Earth Creek, in a mainly agricultural area. The provincial historic site and national historic site of Victoria Settlement and the tourist attraction Metis Crossing is nearby. Long Lake Provincial Park is located 60 km (37 mi) north of the town.

The Woods Cree, a First Nations people, named "Smoking Lake" for the smoke from ceremonies performed on the shore; the name Smoky Lake may also be based on the mist that rose from the lake in great quantities at sundown. One of its churches, the St. Onuphrius Ukrainian-Catholic, built in 1907, has been moved to the Canadian Museum of History in Gatineau, Quebec. It is in Census Division No. 12 and is the municipal office for Smoky Lake County.

== Demographics ==
In the 2021 Census of Population conducted by Statistics Canada, the Town of Smoky Lake had a population of 1,031 living in 442 of its 518 total private dwellings, a change of 7% from its 2016 population of 964. With a land area of 4.26 km^{2} (1.64 sq mi), it had a population density of 242.0/km^{2} (626.8/sq mi) in 2021.

In the 2016 Census of Population conducted by Statistics Canada, the Town of Smoky Lake recorded a population of 964 living in 421 of its 499 total private dwellings, a −5.7% change from its 2011 population of 1,022. With a land area of 4.26 km^{2} (1.64 sq mi), it had a population density of 226.3/km^{2} (586.1/sq mi) in 2016.

As of 2026, the population of Smoky Lake is 1,207.

== Notable people ==
- Martha Bielish (1915 - 2010) - politician, farmer, feminist, teacher and Canadian senator
- Mary Burzminski, track and field athlete
- Eddie Carroll, actor, voice over
- John Dubetz, Alberta politician
- Terry Ewasiuk, professional ice hockey player
- Isidore Goresky, Alberta legislator
- Ray Kinasewich, professional ice hockey player
- Steve Zarusky, Alberta politician

== See also ==
- List of communities in Alberta
- List of towns in Alberta
