= Glenn van Dijken =

Canadian politician

Glenn van Dijken MLA
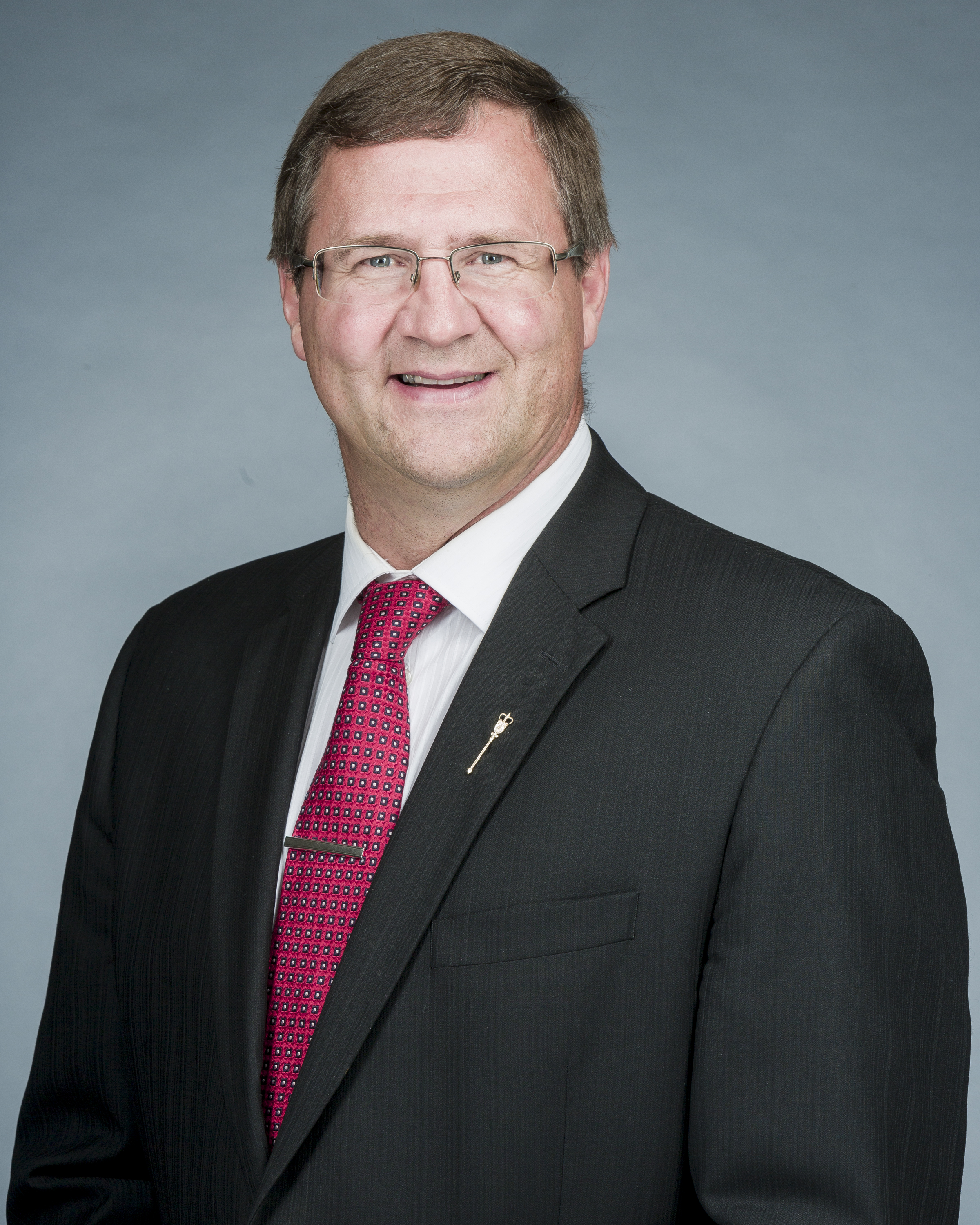

Member of the Legislative Assembly of Alberta
- Incumbent
- Assumed office May 5, 2015
- Preceded by: Maureen Kubinec
- Constituency: Barrhead-Morinville-Westlock (2015-19); Athabasca-Barrhead-Westlock (2019-present)

Personal details
- Born: September 6, 1962 (age 64) Alberta, Canada
- Party: United Conservative
- Other political affiliations: Wildrose (2015–17)
- Occupation: Grain Farmer

Glenn Jerry van Dijken (born September 6, 1962) is a Canadian politician who was elected in the 2019 Alberta general election to represent the electoral district of Athabasca-Barrhead-Westlock in the 30th Alberta Legislature. He was re-elected in 2023.

He currently serves on the Economy and Affordability Cabinet Policy Committee and is currently Parliamentary Secretary for Agrifood Development. Mr. Dijken also currently serves as Chair of the Standing Committee on Alberta's Economic Future, Deputy Chair of the Standing Committee on Legislative Offices and member on the Special Standing Committee on Members' Services. He has previously served as chair of the Standing Committee on Alberta's Economic Future and has previously been on the Standing Committee on Legislative Offices, Standing Committee on Privileges and Election, Standing Orders and Printing, Select Special Auditor General Committee, Select Special Ethics and Accountability Committee as well as the Select Special Ombudsman and Public Interest Commissioner Search Committee among others.

Before being elected, van Dijken was focused on his family grain farm in Dapp, Alberta. For this, he and his wife, Barb, were named Outstanding Young Farmers of Alberta in 2001.

As MLA, Dijken has often spoken of the need for Alberta to have more say when it comes to its relationship with the federal government. When describing the recently introduced Sovereignty Act, Dijken describes how “We are partners in confederation, and ensuring that there are no conflicts in jurisdictions will help the governments focus on what they are responsible for so it be a true partnership".

On April 7, 2021, Dijken was one of 16 other MLAs who sent a letter opposing additional covid restrictions which put limits on restaurants, stores and gyms.

Dijken also sponsored Bill 206 titled the Prohibiting Ownership of Agricultural Lands (Pension Plans and Trust Corporations) Act. Dijken took issue when stakeholders came to him concerned about large firms buying up parcels of land only to sell it a few years later. Many saw this as contributing to people moving out of small towns and instead moving to bigger cities.

== Recall Petition ==
A recall petition against van Dijken was approved by Elections Alberta on November 14, 2025. Signature collection runs from November 26, 2025 to February 23, 2026, requiring 12,719 signatures.

== Electoral history ==
=== 2023 general election ===
2023 Alberta general election: Athabasca-Barrhead-Westlock
Party	Candidate	Votes	%	±%
United Conservative	Glenn van Dijken	15,631	74.32	+5.81
New Democratic	Landen Tischer	5,401	25.68	+6.19
Total		21,032	99.21	–
Rejected and declined		167	0.79	
Turnout		21,199	60.08	
Eligible voters		35,286		
United Conservative hold		Swing		-0.19
Source(s) Source: Elections Alberta

UCP Athabasca-Barrhead-Westlock nomination contest: December 9-10, 2022

Candidate
Candidate	Votes	%
Glenn van Dijken	500	52.8
Isaac Skuban	447	47.2
Total	947	100.0

=== 2019 general election ===
2019 Alberta general election: Athabasca-Barrhead-Westlock
Party	Candidate	Votes	%	±%	Expenditures
United Conservative	Glenn van Dijken	16,822	68.51%	-0.66%	$41,428
New Democratic	Therese Taschuk	4,786	19.49%	-11.19%	$63,567
Alberta Party	Wayne Rufiange	2,232	9.09%	–	$3,538
Alberta Independence	Buster Malcolm	442	1.80%	–	$968
Independent	Brad Giroux	273	1.11%	–	$3,038
Total		24,555	–	–	
Rejected, spoiled and declined		72	53	16	
Eligible electors / turnout		34,049	72.53%	–	
United Conservative notional hold		Swing		N/A	
Source(s) Source: Elections Alberta Change is based on re-distributed results from the 2015 Alberta general election. Note: Expenses is the sum of "Election Expenses", "Other Expenses" and "Transfers Issued". The Elections Act limits "Election Expenses" to $50,000.

=== 2015 general election ===
2015 Alberta general election: Barrhead-Morinville-Westlock
Party	Candidate	Votes	%	±%
Wildrose	Glenn van Dijken	7,206	39.35%	-3.31%
New Democratic	Tristan Turner	6,232	34.03%	28.13%
Progressive Conservative	Maureen Kubinec	4,876	26.62%	-18.10%
Total		18,314	–	–
Rejected, spoiled and declined		59	–	–
Eligible electors / turnout		28,176	65.21%	–
Wildrose gain from Progressive Conservative		Swing		1.63%
Source(s) Source: "Elections Alberta 2015 General Election". Elections Alberta.
