= Nate Horner =

Canadian politician (born 1980/81)

The Honourable Nate Horner ECA MLA
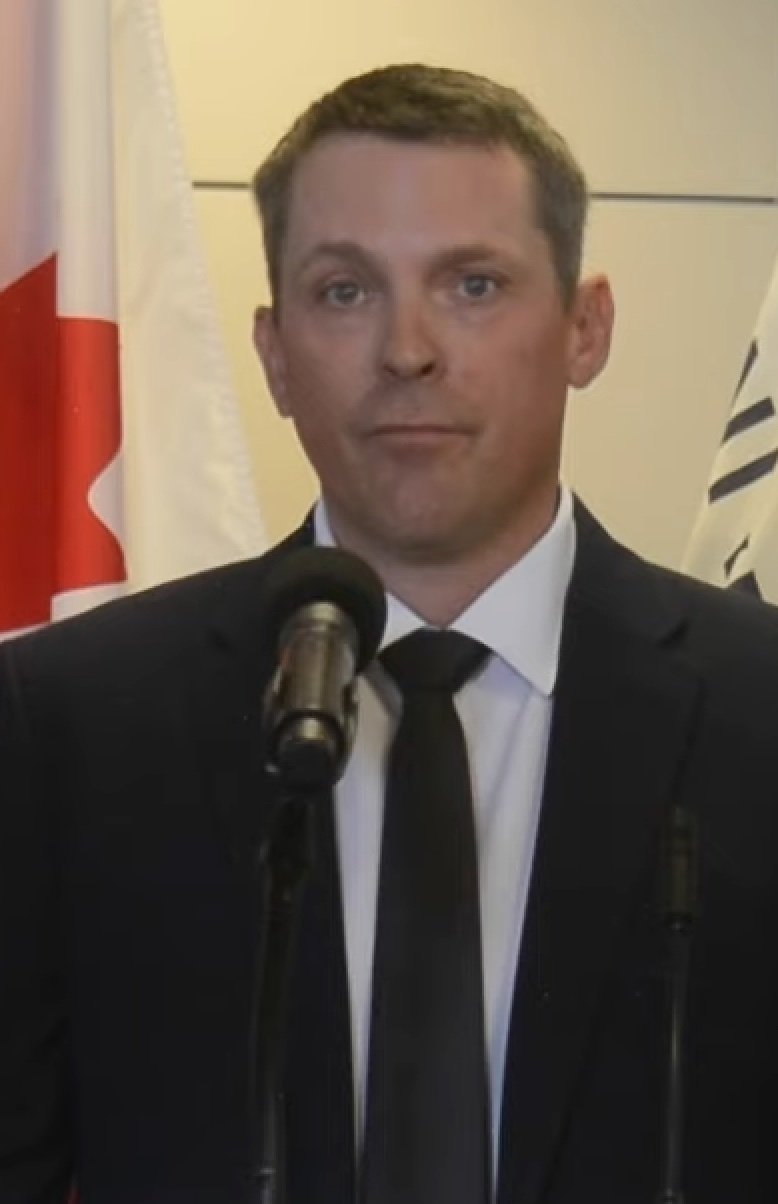
- Horner in 2024

Minister of Finance and President of Treasury Board
- In office June 9, 2023 – May 21, 2026
- Premier: Danielle Smith
- Preceded by: Travis Toews
- Succeeded by: Jason Nixon

Minister of Agriculture and Irrigation
- In office November 5, 2021 – June 9, 2023
- Premier: Jason Kenney; Danielle Smith
- Preceded by: Devin Dreeshen
- Succeeded by: RJ Sigurdson

Associate Minister of Rural Economic Development
- In office July 08, 2021 – November 5, 2021

Member of the Legislative Assembly of Alberta for Drumheller-Stettler
- Incumbent
- Assumed office April 16, 2019
- Preceded by: Rick Strankman

Personal details
- Born: 1980 or 1981 (age 45–46)
- Party: United Conservative Party
- Education: University of Lethbridge (BSc)
- Occupation: rancher

Nathan Horner ECA MLA (born 1980/1981) is a Canadian politician who served as the Minister of Finance and President of Treasury Board of Alberta from 2023 to 2026. He was first elected in the 2019 Alberta general election to represent the electoral district of Drumheller-Stettler as a member of the United Conservative Party (UCP).

== Life and career ==
Before being elected, Horner was a rancher and an emergency medical responder. He received his Bachelor of Science degree in agriculture from the University of Lethbridge. Nate and his wife, Jennifer, have two young children.

The Horner family has deep roots in Canadian Conservatism as well as Methodism. Nate is related to Ralph Cecil Horner (b.1854), founder of numerous Holiness movement churches and later the Standard Church of America in 1916. Horner is also related to Alberta MLA and former deputy-premier Doug Horner and MPs Jack Horner, Hugh Horner, Albert Horner and Norval Horner. Hugh, Norval, and Jack are the sons of former Canadian senator Ralph Horner.

He was appointed to the ministry on July 8, 2021, as Associate Minister of Rural Economic Development. Then on November 5, 2021, he was promoted to a full minister as Minister of Agriculture and Irrigation, then known as Agriculture Irrigation, forestry, and Rural Economic Development during the Kenney Ministry. As Minister, Horner supported the Alberta Agri-Processing Investment Tax Credit, describing how it would "support growth, diversify the province's economy and ensure producers have a competitive market for their goods." The province announced the program would have investments of more than $10 million in the agri-processing industry qualify for a 12 percent tax credit.

In addition to being Minister of Agriculture and Irrigation, he was also on the Economy and Affordability Cabinet Policy Committee as well as the Emergency Management Cabinet Committee. Previously as Associate Minister of Rural Economic Development, Horner was Deputy Chair of the Select Special Democratic Accountability Committee, and had been on the Standing Committee on Alberta's Economic Future, Standing Committee on Private Bills and Private Members’ Public Bills as well as the Standing Committee on Privileges and Elections, Standing Orders and Printing.

He was re-elected in the 2023 Alberta general election, becoming Minister of Finance shortly afterwards.

In February 2026, the Danielle Smith government announced an over $9 billion budget deficit due to lower oil royalty prices; Horner admitted to breaking the government's own 'fiscal rules'. The budget included increased healthcare and education spending, with Horner ruling out tax hikes and big cuts. He will not seek re-election in the next Alberta general election.

== Electoral history ==
=== 2023 general election ===
2023 Alberta general election: Drumheller-Stettler
Party	Candidate	Votes	%	±%
United Conservative	Nate Horner	15,270	82.14	+5.45
New Democratic	Juliet Franklin	2,684	14.44	+7.90
Alberta Independence	Shannon Packham	382	2.05	+1.01
Wildrose Loyalty Coalition	Hannah Stretch Viens	150	0.81	–
Solidarity Movement	Carla Evers	104	0.56	–
Total		18,590	99.45	–
Rejected and declined		103	0.55	
Turnout		18,693	60.59	
Eligible voters		30,850		
United Conservative hold		Swing		-1.22
Source(s) Source: Elections Alberta

=== 2019 general election ===
2019 Alberta general election: Drumheller-Stettler
Party	Candidate	Votes	%	±%
United Conservative	Nate Horner	16,958	76.69%	-4.89%
Independent	Rick Strankman	1,841	8.33%	–
Alberta Party	Mark Nikota	1,461	6.61%	–
New Democratic	Holly Heffernan	1,446	6.54%	-11.89%
Alberta Independence	Jason Hushagen	230	1.04%	–
Alberta Advantage	Greg Herzog	176	0.80%	–
Total		22,112	–	–
Rejected, spoiled and declined		62	51	4
Eligible electors / turnout		29,679	74.73%	15.43%
United Conservative hold		Swing		27.31%
Source(s) Source: "59 - Drumheller-Stettler, 2019 Alberta general election". officialresults.elections.ab.ca. Elections Alberta. Alberta. Chief Electoral Officer (2019). 2019 General Election. A Report of the Chief Electoral Officer. Volume II (PDF) (Report). Vol. 2. Edmonton, Alta.: Elections Alberta. pp. 262–268. ISBN 978-1-988620-12-1.
