= Doug Horner =

Canadian politician

The Honourable Doug Horner ECA
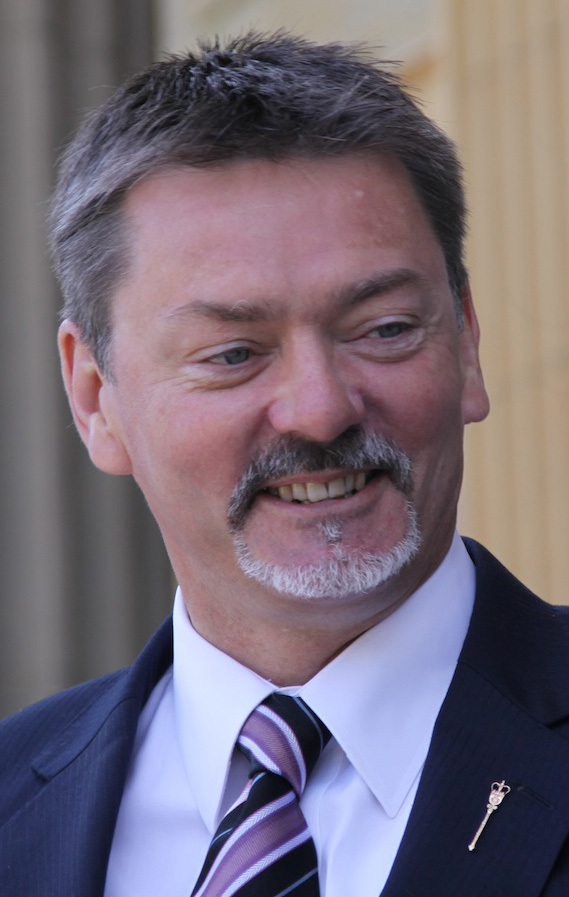
- Horner in 2011

President of Treasury Board & Minister of Finance in the Alberta government
- In office 8 May 2012 – 15 September 2014
- Preceded by: Ron Liepert
- Succeeded by: Robin Campbell

7th Deputy Premier of Alberta
- In office 12 October 2011 – 8 May 2012
- Preceded by: Vacancy
- Succeeded by: Thomas Lukaszuk
- In office 15 January 2010 – February 2011
- Preceded by: Vacant (Last held by Ron Stevens)
- Succeeded by: Vacancy

MLA for Spruce Grove-Sturgeon-St. Albert
- In office 2001–2012
- Preceded by: Colleen Soetaert
- Succeeded by: riding dissolved

MLA for Spruce Grove-St. Albert
- In office 2012 – 31 January 2015
- Preceded by: first member
- Succeeded by: Vivienne Horne (Canadian politician)

Personal details
- Born: 17 January 1961 (age 65) Barrhead, Alberta, Canada
- Party: Progressive Conservative
- Occupation: Businessman

Douglas Alan Horner ECA (born 17 January 1961) is a former Canadian politician, who represented the electoral district of Spruce Grove-St. Albert in the Legislative Assembly of Alberta from 2001 until 31 January 2015. He was the President of the Treasury Board and Minister of Finance until Jim Prentice's cabinet was sworn in on 15 September 2014. He was a candidate for the leadership of the Alberta Progressive Conservative Party in its 2011 leadership election, placing third.

In 2006, when Ed Stelmach became premier, Horner was appointed Minister of Advanced Education and Technology. He retained the position in cabinet shuffle on 13 January 2010, and was also appointed to the position of Deputy Premier. He was first elected in the 2001 provincial election. He became the province's Minister of Agriculture in 2004 under Premier Ralph Klein. On 22 January 2015, he announced that he would be retiring as an MLA effective 31 January 2015.

== Early life ==
Born in Barrhead, Alberta, to Jean and Dr. Hugh Horner, Doug Horner has lived in Calgary, Consort, Slave Lake, Morinville and Spruce Grove.

Horner comes from a politically active family; his grandfather, Ralph Horner, was a Senator for Saskatchewan, his father, Dr. Hugh Horner was a federal Member of Parliament under John Diefenbaker and then Alberta's agriculture minister and deputy premier in the 1970s while his uncles Jack Horner, Albert Horner and Norval Horner were also federal MPs. His cousin, Nate Horner, is currently an MLA and previously served as Alberta's Finance Minister.

== Education ==
Horner received his post-secondary education in Alberta. He graduated from SAIT Polytechnic (Southern Alberta Institute of Technology) with a diploma in business. After completing further studies, he was accredited by the Institute of Canadian Bankers.

== Political career ==
=== Minister of Agriculture and Rural Development (2004-2006) ===
- Established Rural Alberta Development Fund.
- Established Biofuels Initiative.
- Vice-chair of the Alberta Grain Commission.

=== Minister of Advanced Education and Technology (2006-2011) ===
- Created Alberta Innovates, which focuses on five areas of investment; digital health, clean resource technologies, smart agriculture, entrepreneurial ecosystem and artificial intelligence.
- Instrumental in creating two new universities: Grant MacEwan University and Mount Royal University.
- Led the creation of Campus Alberta and the establishment of Apply Alberta in an effort to streamline the application process.
- Chair of the Alberta government´s Information and Communications Technology Implementation Committee

=== Deputy Premier of Alberta (2010–2011) ===
Horner became Deputy Premier of Alberta in January 2010. He resigned in February 2011 to become a candidate for PC leadership. He was reappointed to this post again at the conclusion of the PC leadership election.

=== Committee service ===
- Member of the Standing Committee on Law and Regulations
- Special Standing Committee on Members’ Services and the Standing Policy Committee on Justice and Government Services.
- Member of the Treasury Board and the Cabinet Policy Committee on the Economy.
- Member of the Standing Committee on Private Bills.
- Chair of the Alberta government's Information and Communications Technology Implementation Committee

=== PC leadership candidate, 2011 ===
On 4 February 2011, Horner resigned from cabinet in order to run for the leadership of the PC Party in its 2011 leadership election. After the 17 September vote, he finished in the top three (behind Gary Mar and Alison Redford). Redford won the run-off ballot held on 1 October.

=== President of Treasury Board and Minister of Finance (2012-2014) ===
Horner won the vote of the Spruce Grove-St. Albert-Sturgeon riding in Alberta's provincial elections in 2012. Horner sponsored the controversial Bill 46: Public Service Salary Restraint Act which threatens to take away the right of arbitration from thousands of public sector workers.

== Leadership and influence ==
Horner is a featured speaker for the "Think Big Alberta" Tour. During the summer of 2011, the tour will visit the cities of Edmonton, Red Deer, Grand Prairie, Fort McMurray, Lethbridge, Medicine Hat and Calgary. Other speakers include John Furlong, who provided leadership for the team that organized and delivered the Vancouver 2010 Olympic and Paralympic Winter Games.

== Business career ==
Before being elected to the Alberta Legislature, Horner worked in the private sector, including banking in southern Alberta and agriculture. He was involved in the start-up and operations of his family's barley and oat processing mill. Later he became responsible for international marketing and sales of specialty grains for ConAgra from its Nebraska office. After three years he moved back to Canada and established a trading company for agrifoods and agrifeeds for domestic and international markets.

== Military service ==
Horner has served in the Canadian Forces Reserve, and as the Minister Liaison to the Canadian Forces.

== Community involvement ==
Horner is a member of the Spruce Grove & District Chamber of Commerce, the St. Albert Parkland Rotary Club, the Royal Canadian Legion, the Loyal Edmonton Regiment Association and several other service and community organizations.
