= List of members of the Canadian House of Commons with military service (Q) =

Name	Elected party	Constituency	Elected date	Military service
Victor Quelch	Social Credit	Acadia	October 14, 1935	Canadian Army (1914-1918)
