= Rod Thomson =

Canadian politician

Roderick J. (Rod) Thomson

Member of Parliament for Battleford—Kindersley
- In office June 1968 – September 1972

Personal details
- Born: 5 February 1924 Springwater, Saskatchewan
- Died: 26 December 1994 (aged 70) Saskatoon, Saskatchewan
- Party: New Democratic
- Profession: Farmer

Roderick John Thomson (5 February 1924 – 26 December 1994) was a New Democratic Party member of the House of Commons of Canada. He was a farmer by career.

Rod Thomson was first elected at the Battleford—Kindersley riding in the 1968 general election after an unsuccessful attempt to win the Rosetown—Biggar riding in the 1963 election. After serving his only term, the 28th Canadian Parliament, Thomson was defeated at Battleford—Kindersley by Norval Horner of the Progressive Conservative party in the 1972 election. Thomson also campaigned for a seat there in the 1974 election, but he and Horner were both defeated on that occasion by Cliff McIsaac of the Liberal Party. He died on 26 December 1994 at the age of 70.
