= Jack Hayden (politician) =

Canadian politician

The Honourable Jack Hayden ECA

MLA for Drumheller-Stettler
- In office 2007–2012
- Preceded by: Shirley McClellan
- Succeeded by: Rick Strankman

Minister of Tourism, Parks and Recreation in the Alberta government
- In office October 12, 2011 – May 8, 2012
- Preceded by: Cindy Ady
- Succeeded by: Christine Cusanelli

Former Minister of Infrastructure in the Alberta government
- In office March 12, 2008 – October 12, 2011
- Preceded by: Luke Ouellette
- Succeeded by: Jeff Johnson

Personal details
- Born: John Ralph Hayden c. 1950 (age 75–76)
- Party: Progressive Conservative
- Children: 3
- Occupation: Politician
- Website: http://www.jackhayden.ca/

John Ralph "Jack" Hayden ECA (born c. 1950) is a Canadian politician and former Member of the Legislative Assembly of Alberta, who represented the constituency of Drumheller-Stettler as a Progressive Conservative from 2007 to 2012.

== Political career ==
Hayden was elected to his second term representing the constituents of Drumheller-Stettler with 69 per cent of the vote in the 2008 provincial election. He was appointed as Minister of Infrastructure after the election by Premier Ed Stelmach.

Hayden was first elected in a 2007 by-election, winning 58 per cent of the vote, to fill a spot left vacant when Shirley McClellan, a 20-year veteran of the Legislature, resigned. In 2006, he was rural campaign chair for Premier Ed Stelmach's leadership bid.

Before entering provincial politics, Hayden was involved in municipal government. He was a councillor and reeve in the County of Stettler. Hayden was elected president of the Alberta Association of Municipal Districts and Counties in 1998, and remained president until he vacated his position are reeve in 2004.

Hayden represented rural interests on numerous committees, including Prime Minister Paul Martin's External Advisory Committee on Cities and Communities, and numerous provincial advisory boards. He was placed on the Federation of Canadian Municipalities Roll of Honour in 2006, after serving on the board of directors for six years.

== Personal life ==
Hayden lives on a farm near Endiang. Jack has three grown children.

In 2002, he was awarded a Queen Elizabeth II Golden Jubilee Medal, honouring his service to community.

== Election results ==
Alberta provincial by-election, June 12, 2007: Drumheller-Stettler
Party	Candidate	Votes	%	±%
Progressive Conservative	Jack Hayden	4,180	57.65	−7.37
Liberal	Tom Dooley	993	13.69	–
Social Credit	Larry Davidson	852	11.75	9.08
Independent	John Rew	519	7.16	–
Alberta Alliance	Dave France	355	4.90	−8.68
Green	Jennifer Wigmore	249	3.43	–
New Democratic	Richard Bough	103	1.42	−6.92
Total		7,251	–	–
Rejected, spoiled, and declined		13	25	3
Eligible electors / turnout		22,509	32.31	–
Progressive Conservative hold		Swing		−10.53
Source(s) Alberta. Chief Electoral Officer (2007). Report on the June 12, 2007 By-elections: Calgary-Elbow & Drumheller-Stettler (Report). Edmonton: Legislative Assembly of Alberta; Chief Electoral Officer.

2008 Alberta general election: Drumheller-Stettler
Party	Candidate	Votes	%	±%
Progressive Conservative	Jack Hayden	6,986	68.90%	11.25%
Liberal	Tom Dooley	1,463	14.43%	0.73%
Wildrose Alliance	Dave France	1,062	10.47%	5.57%
Green	Amanda Bolton	353	3.48%	0.05%
New Democratic	Richard Bough	276	2.72%	1.30%
Total		10,140	–	–
Rejected, spoiled, and declined		27	7	1
Eligible electors / turnout		23,268	43.73%	–
Progressive Conservative hold		Swing		5.99%
Source(s) Office of the Chief Electoral Officer (2008). The Report on the March 3, 2008 Provincial General Election of the Twenty-Seventh Legislative Assembly. Edmonton: Alberta Legislative Assembly. pp. 402–407. ISSN 1483-1171.
