= The Battlefords (federal electoral district) =

Former federal electoral district in Saskatchewan, Canada

The Battlefords was a federal electoral district in Saskatchewan, Canada, that was represented in the House of Commons of Canada from 1935 to 1968. This riding was created in 1933 from parts of North Battleford, Rosetown and South Battleford ridings.

It was abolished in 1966 when it was redistributed into Meadow Lake, Battleford—Kindersley and Saskatoon—Biggar ridings.

== History ==
=== Historical boundaries ===
1933 representation order

1947 representation order

1952 representation order

=== Members of Parliament ===
This ridings elected the following members of Parliament:

1. Joseph Needham, Social Credit (1935–1940)
2. John Albert Gregory, Liberal (1940–1945)
3. Max Campbell, Co-operative Commonwealth Federation (CCF) (1945–1949)
4. Arthur James Bater, Liberal (1949–1953)
5. Max Campbell, CCF (1953–1958)
6. Albert Horner, Progressive Conservative (1958–1968)

== Election results ==
1935 Canadian federal election
Party	Candidate	Votes
Social Credit	Joseph Needham	6,314
Liberal	John Vallance	5,990
Co-operative Commonwealth	Louise Lucas	3,247
Conservative	Ariel Franklin Sallows	2,766

1940 Canadian federal election
Party	Candidate	Votes
Liberal	John Albert Gregory	7,195
New Democracy	Joseph Needham	5,453
Co-operative Commonwealth	I.C. Nollet	4,512

1945 Canadian federal election
Party	Candidate	Votes
Co-operative Commonwealth	Max Campbell	7,579
Liberal	John Albert Gregory	5,156
Progressive Conservative	John David Deans	2,994
Social Credit	Anders Olav Aalborg	1,346

1949 Canadian federal election
Party	Candidate	Votes
Liberal	Arthur James Bater	8,034
Co-operative Commonwealth	Max Campbell	6,715
Progressive Conservative	John George Walker	1,948

1953 Canadian federal election
Party	Candidate	Votes
Co-operative Commonwealth	Max Campbell	8,922
Liberal	Arthur James Bater	8,481
Progressive Conservative	Alfred V. Svoboda	1,345

1957 Canadian federal election
Party	Candidate	Votes
Co-operative Commonwealth	Max Campbell	8,320
Liberal	Duff Noble	6,287
Progressive Conservative	Albert Horner	4,325
Social Credit	Peter J. Klippenstein	2,298

1958 Canadian federal election
Party	Candidate	Votes
Progressive Conservative	Albert Horner	10,970
Co-operative Commonwealth	Max Campbell	6,363
Liberal	William J. Burak	2,975

1962 Canadian federal election
Party	Candidate	Votes
Progressive Conservative	Albert Horner	11,740
New Democratic	Joe Phelps	5,166
Liberal	S. Duff Noble	5,045

1963 Canadian federal election
Party	Candidate	Votes
Progressive Conservative	Albert Horner	12,108
Liberal	Hugh James Maher	4,179
New Democratic	Fred Woloshyn	3,771
Social Credit	John Boskay	746

1965 Canadian federal election
Party	Candidate	Votes
Progressive Conservative	Albert Horner	10,297
New Democratic	Don Sinclair	6,107
Liberal	Ed Odishaw	4,478

== See also ==
- List of Canadian electoral districts
- Historical federal electoral districts of Canada
