= Robert Gardiner (politician) =

Canadian politician

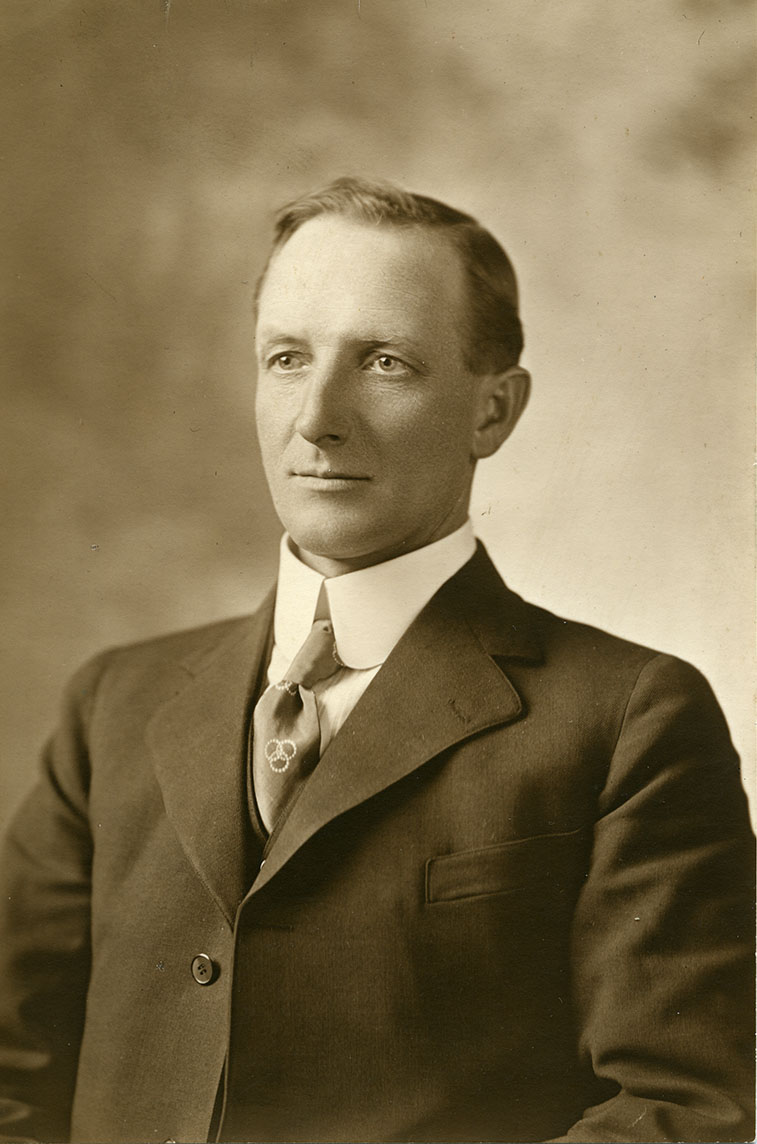

Member of Parliament
- In office 1921–1925
- Preceded by: Arthur Sifton
- Succeeded by: Frederick William Gershaw
- Constituency: Medicine Hat
- In office 1925–1935
- Succeeded by: Victor Quelch
- Constituency: Acadia

Personal details
- Born: February 24, 1879 Aberdeenshire, Scotland
- Died: February 6, 1945 (aged 65) Calgary, Alberta, Canada
- Party: United Farmers of Alberta

Robert Gardiner (February 24, 1879 – February 6, 1945) was a farmer and federal Member of Parliament from Canada. He was born in Aberdeenshire, Scotland.

Gardiner first ran for a seat in the House of Commons of Canada for the Progressive Party of Canada in a by-election on June 27, 1921. He won the district of Medicine Hat in a landslide defeating former provincial Conservative MLA and Mayor of Medicine Hat Nelson Spencer. Gardiner defended his incumbency less than 6 months later in the 1921 Canadian federal election. He was easily re-elected in the cold winter election, defeating by a landslide the future Member of Parliament Frederick William Gershaw a candidate from the Liberals.

The 1925 Canadian federal election saw the ridings in Alberta redistributed, Gardiner changed to the brand new Acadia district. In his 3rd bid for election he would go up against former Liberal MLA Robert Eaton. He would defeat Eaton in another landslide victory. Less than a year later another election would be called after the collapse of the Liberal Progressive coalition, Gardiner would run for a 4th term in office and for the 4th time in just 5 years. He easily won his district again in the 1926 Canadian federal election this time under the banner of the United Farmers of Alberta. Gardiner would be acclaimed to his 5th term in the 1930 Canadian federal election and also served as president of the UFA. Upon running for his 6th term in office, this time under the Co-operative Commonwealth Federation banner, he would be defeated by Victor Quelch from the Social Credit Party of Canada in the 1935 Canadian federal election. He died in Calgary in 1945.

Gardiner was a member of the Ginger Group of radical MPs in the 1920s and early 1930s.
