= Arthur James Bater =

Canadian politician

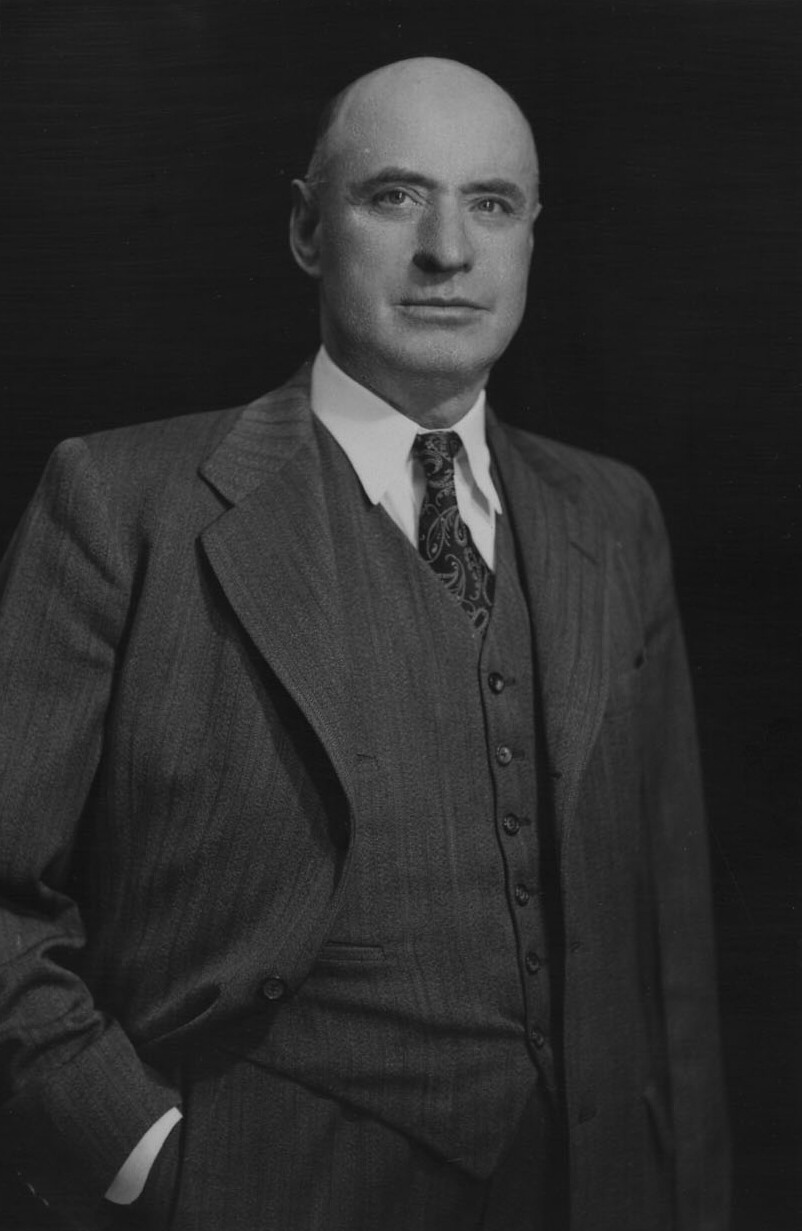
- Bater, c. 1940s

Member of the Canadian Parliament for The Battlefords
- In office 1949–1953
- Preceded by: Max Campbell
- Succeeded by: Max Campbell

Personal details
- Born: 29 December 1889 Cornwall, England
- Died: 5 April 1969 (aged 79) North Battleford, Saskatchewan, Canada
- Spouse: Mary Rayner
- Occupation: farmer

Arthur James Bater (29 December 1889 – 5 April 1969) was an English-Canadian politician and farmer. He was elected to the House of Commons of Canada in the 1949 election and defeated in the 1953 election.
