= Jack Ramsay (politician) =

Canadian politician (born 1937)

Member of Parliament for Crowfoot
- In office 1993–2000
- Preceded by: Arnold Malone
- Succeeded by: Kevin Sorenson

Leader of the Western Canada Concept
- In office 1982–1988

Personal details
- Born: August 23, 1937 (age 88) Biggar, Saskatchewan, Canada
- Party: Independent; Reform (1988-2000); Western Canada Concept (until 1988)
- Profession: Police officer

F.J. "Jack" Ramsay (born August 23, 1937) is a former Reform Party of Canada member of the House of Commons of Canada and former Royal Canadian Mounted Police officer. He was later convicted for indecent assault for actions during his time as an officer.

== Western Canada Concept ==
Ramsay took over the leadership of the Western Canada Concept, a party that advocated the separation of western Canada to form an independent nation, at the end of 1982. He acted as its leader until 1987, the year he joined the Reform Party. In April 1982, the party's executive drew up a Statement of Independence which committed any future WCC government to "prepare for independence in a peaceful and democratic manner". While the WCC under Ramsay's leadership had a brief period when it pursued a Triple E Senate as an alternative to outright independence, in late 1986 Ramsay declared the WCC would revert to its Western separatist goals. Only two years after making this renewed commitment to Western separatism as WCC leader, he joined the new Reform Party.

== Reform Party ==
Ramsay first ran as a Reform candidate in the staunchly conservative riding of Crowfoot in the 1988 election. He did surprisingly well in the riding, coming in second to Progressive Conservative Arnold Malone by 7,685 votes, which at that time had been the narrowest margin of victory by any winner in the history of the riding. It was also the best showing of any Reform Party candidate.

Malone retired before the 1993 federal election, and Ramsay ran again for the Reform Party. This time he won a resounding victory, owing partly to the collapse of the Tories throughout western Canada. He finished some 17,000 votes ahead of his nearest opponent. He was re-elected in the 1997 election.

He served as the party's Justice Critic from 1996 until 1998, and as Citizenship and Immigration Critic from 1998 until 2000.

== Criminal charges ==
On November 24, 1999, Ramsay was convicted of attempted rape of a 14-year-old Cree girl, committed while he was an RCMP officer in Pelican Narrows 30 years previously. While questioning the girl as a crime victim, he had asked her to physically demonstrate her understanding of the concept of sexual intercourse.

He was sentenced to nine months imprisonment. The Reform Party voted to remove him from caucus the following morning, although he refused to resign his seat in the House of Commons on the grounds that he had not yet been sentenced and continued to protest his innocence of the crime. He subsequently appealed the conviction, and a new trial was ordered due to errors in the judge's instructions to the jury. His removal from the Reform Party caucus was also suspended pending the outcome of the appeal.

He continued to sit as a member of the Reform Party, and its successor the Canadian Alliance, until April 5, 2000, when he faced new criminal allegations related to a separate incident in which Ramsay was alleged to have confined a 15-year-old girl and made threats of a sexual nature. He then sat as an "Independent Canadian Alliance" member from April 6, 2000 until June 27, 2000, at which point his membership in the party was terminated. He sat as an independent Member of Parliament until that Parliament was dissolved.

Ramsay's trial on the unlawful confinement charges began in May 2000. He was acquitted on these charges two days later.

Ramsay ran in the 2000 federal election as an independent candidate, but was overwhelmingly defeated by Canadian Alliance candidate Kevin Sorenson.

In the retrial on the original charges, Ramsay pleaded guilty in October 2001 to a lesser charge of indecent assault, and was sentenced to one year's probation and community service. He subsequently sued the RCMP, the Attorney General of Saskatchewan and the Attorney General of Canada for malicious prosecution.
