= Vivienne Horne =

Canadian politician (born 1991)

Member of the Legislative Assembly of Alberta for Spruce Grove-St. Albert
- In office May 5, 2015 – April 16, 2019
- Preceded by: Doug Horner
- Succeeded by: district abolished

Personal details
- Born: March 24, 1991 (age 35) Edmonton, Alberta
- Party: Alberta New Democratic Party
- Occupation: Student

Vivienne Horne (born March 24, 1991) is a Canadian politician who was elected in the 2015 Alberta general election to the Legislative Assembly of Alberta representing the electoral district of Spruce Grove-St. Albert. She was a student in political science at MacEwan University in Edmonton.

Prior to her election, Horne was a barista at a St. Albert Starbucks.

Horne came out as transgender in 2025.

Horne endorsed Alberta MP Heather McPherson in the 2026 New Democratic Party leadership election.

== Electoral history ==
=== 2015 general election ===
2015 Alberta general election: Spruce Grove-St. Albert
Party	Candidate	Votes	%	±%
New Democratic	Trevor Horne (Note: Horne is now known as Vivienne Horne due to gender transition.)	11,546	46.55%	37.52%
Progressive Conservative	Rus Matichuk	6,362	25.65%	-29.23%
Wildrose	Jaye Walter	4,631	18.67%	-8.51%
Alberta Party	Gary Hanna	1,081	4.36%	–
Liberal	Reg Lukasik	916	3.69%	-5.23%
Green	Brendon Greene	269	1.08%	–
Total		24,805	–	–
Rejected, spoiled and declined		44	–	–
Eligible electors / turnout		46,603	53.32%	-3.08%
New Democratic gain from Progressive Conservative		Swing		-3.40%
Source(s) Source: "Spruce Grove-St. Albert 2015 General Election Results". Elections Alberta.
