= Drumheller-Stettler =

Provincial electoral district in Alberta, Canada

Alberta electoral district
- Drumheller-Stettler within Alberta, 2017 boundaries

Provincial electoral district
- Legislature: Legislative Assembly of Alberta
MLA
Nate Horner
United Conservative
- District created: 2003
- First contested: 2004
- Last contested: 2023

Drumheller-Stettler is a provincial electoral district (riding) in Alberta, Canada. The electoral district is mandated to return a single member to the Legislative Assembly of Alberta using the first past the post method of voting. The district was created in the 2003 boundary redistribution and came into force in 2004 from the old districts of Drumheller-Chinook and Lacombe-Stettler.

The district is named after the towns of Drumheller and Stettler and covers a large rural portion of central east Alberta. It also contains the towns of Cereal, Consort, Hanna, Oyen and Youngstown and Dinosaur Provincial Park.

Situated in a very conservative region even by the standards of rural central Alberta, the district and its antecedents have been strongholds of centre-right parties for decades, such as the Social Credit Party, Progressive Conservatives, Wildrose Party, and currently the United Conservative Party, giving them their best result of all ridings in the 2023 provincial election, with over 82% of the vote. Smaller right wing parties such as the Alberta Alliance and Western Canada Concept have also historically done well in this region. The current representative in the district is Nate Horner.

== History ==
The electoral district was created in the 2003 boundary redistribution after parts of Drumheller-Chinook and Lacombe-Stettler were merged. The 2010 redistribution saw Paintearth County transferred to this division from Battle River-Wainwright.

=== Boundary history ===
52 Drumheller-Stettler 2003 boundaries
Bordering districts
North	East	West	South
Battle River-Wainwright	none	Innisfail-Sylvan Lake, Lacombe-Ponoka, Olds-Didsbury-Three Hills, Strathmore-Brooks	Cypress-Medicine Hat
riding map goes here			
Legal description from the Statutes of Alberta 2003, Electoral Divisions Act.
Starting at the intersection of the north boundary of Twp. 42 and the east boundary of Rge. 19; then 1. east along the north boundary to the right bank of the Battle River; 2. downstream along the right bank to the east boundary of Sec. 8 in Twp. 41, Rge. 16 W4; 3. south along the east boundary of Secs. 8 and 5 in the Twp. and the east boundary of Secs. 32, 29, 20, 17, 8 and 5 in Twps. 40, 39, 38 and 37, Rge. 16 W4 to the north boundary of Twp. 36; 4. east along the north boundary to the east boundary of Sec. 33 in the Twp.; 5. south along the east boundary of Secs. 33, 28, 21 and 16 in the Twp. to the north boundary of Sec. 10 in the Twp.; 6. east along the north boundary of Secs. 10, 11 and 12 in the Twp. and the north boundary of Secs. 7, 8 and 9 in Twp. 36, Rge. 15 W4 to the west shore of Sullivan Lake; 7. southeasterly along the west shore to the north boundary of Twp. 34, Rge. 15 W4; 8. east along the north boundary of Twp. 34 to the east boundary of Rge. 10; 9. north along the east boundary of Rge. 10 to the north boundary of Sec. 6 in Twp. 35, Rge. 9 W4; 10. east along the north boundary of Secs. 6 and 5 to the east boundary of Sec. 8 in the Twp.; 11. north along the east boundary of Secs. 8, 17, 20, 29 and 32 in the Twp. and Secs. 5, 8, 17, 20, 29 and 32 in Twp. 36 to the north boundary of Twp. 36; 12. east along the north boundary of Twp. 36 to the east boundary of Sec. 3 in Twp. 37, Rge. 9, W4; 13. north along the east boundary of Secs. 3 and 10 to the north boundary of Sec. 11; 14. east along the north boundary of Secs. 11 and 12 to the east boundary of Rge. 9 W4; 15. north along the east boundary of Rge. 9 to the north boundary of Twp. 37; 16. east along the north boundary of Twp. 37 to the east boundary of Sec. 33 in Twp. 37, Rge. 3 W4; 17. south along the east boundary of Secs. 33, 28, 21, 16, 9 and 4 in the Twp. and the east boundary of Secs. 33 and 28 in Twp. 36, Rge. 3 W4 to the north boundary of Sec. 22 in the Twp.; 18. east along the north boundary of Secs. 22, 23 and 24 in Rge. 3 W4 and the north boundary of Secs. 19, 20 and 21 in Twp. 36, Rge. 2 W4 to the east boundary of Sec. 21; 19. south along the east boundary of Secs. 21, 16, 9 and 4 to the north boundary of Twp. 35; 20. east along the north boundary of Twp. 35 to the east boundary of the Province; 21. south along the east boundary of the Province to the right bank of the South Saskatchewan River; 22. upstream along the right bank of the river to the east boundary of Rge. 3 W4; 23. north along the east boundary of Rge. 3 W4 to the north boundary of Sec. 13 in Twp. 20, Rge. 3 W4; 24. west along the north boundary of Secs. 13, 14, 15, 16, 17 and 18 in Rges. 3, 4, 5, 6, 7, 8, 9 and 10 to the east boundary of Rge. 11 W4; 25. north along the east boundary of Rge. 11 W4 to the right bank of the Red Deer River; 26. upstream along the right bank to the southeasterly point of the municipal boundary of the Town of Drumheller (at Sec. 22 in Twp. 27, Rge. 18 W4); 27. generally west and north along the municipal boundary of the Town of Drumheller to the intersection with the right bank of the Red Deer River (at Sec. 18, Twp. 29, Rge. 20 W4); 28. upstream along the right bank of the Red Deer River to the north boundary of Twp. 38; 29. east along the north boundary of Twp. 38 to the east boundary of Sec. 3 in the Twp.; 30. north along the east boundary of Secs. 3, 10, 15 and 22 to the north boundary of Sec. 23; 31. east along the north boundary of Secs. 23 and 24 to the east boundary of Rge. 22; 32. north along the east boundary of Rge. 22 to the south shore of Buffalo Lake; 33. in a northerly direction along the west shore of Buffalo Lake to the east boundary of Rge. 22; 34. north along the east boundary of Rge. 22 to the west shore of Buffalo Lake; 35. northeasterly along the west shore to the north boundary of Twp. 40; 36. east along the north boundary to the east shore of Buffalo Lake; 37. in a generally northerly direction along the east shore to the north boundary of Sec. 22 in Twp. 41, Rge. 20 W4; 38. east along the north boundary to the east boundary of Sec. 27; 39. north along the east boundary of Secs. 27 and 34 in the Twp. to the north boundary of Twp. 41; 40. east along the north boundary of Twp. 41 to the east boundary of the west half of Sec. 4 in Twp. 42, Rge. 19 W4; 41. north along the east boundary of the west half of Secs. 4, 9, 16 and 21 in the Twp. to the north boundary of Sec. 21; 42. east along the north boundary of Secs. 21, 22, 23 and 24 in the Twp. to the east boundary of Rge. 19 W4; 43. north along the east boundary of Rge. 19 to the starting point.
Note:

57 Drumheller-Stettler 2010 boundaries
Bordering districts
North	East	West	South
Battle River-Wainwright	Saskatchewan boundary	Innisfail-Sylvan Lake, Lacombe-Ponoka and Olds-Didsbury-Three Hills	Cypress-Medicine Hat and Strathmore-Brooks
Legal description from the Statutes of Alberta 2010, Electoral Divisions Act.

=== Representation history ===
Members of the Legislative Assembly for Drumheller-Stettler
Assembly	Years	Member	Party
See Drumheller-Chinook 1997-2004 and Lacombe-Stettler 1993-2004
26th	2004–2007	Shirley McClellan	Progressive Conservative
26th	2007	Vacant	
26th	2007–2008	Jack Hayden	Progressive Conservative
27th	2008–2012	Jack Hayden	Progressive Conservative
28th	2012–2015	Rick Strankman	Wildrose
29th	2015–2017	Rick Strankman	Wildrose
29th	2017–2019	Rick Strankman	United Conservative
29th	2019	Rick Strankman	Independent
30th	2019–2023	Nate Horner	United Conservative
31st	2023–present	Nate Horner	United Conservative

The riding was created when the writ was dropped for the 2004 general election as a merger between Drumheller-Chinook and the eastern half of the Lacombe-Stettler riding. Deputy Premier Shirley McClellan, MLA for Drumheller-Chinook, defeated five other candidates to pick up the new district.

McClellan resigned her seat in the Legislature on January 15, 2007, the same day that former premier Ralph Klein resigned his seat in Calgary-Elbow. By-elections for both electoral districts were held on June 12, 2007.

The by-election saw a significant shift in support for the opposition parties with the re-emergence of the Liberal Party, which hadn't run a candidate in 2004, taking second place. The Alberta Alliance and NDP fared the worst, both retaining the same candidates from the general election, but dropping from second and third to fifth and last respectively. The Progressive Conservative candidate Jack Hayden won the district with a slightly reduced popular vote. Social Credit made surprising gains, jumping from last to third place, and Independent candidate John Rew also made a strong showing.

Hayden won his second term in the 2008 general election, winning a landslide. He was appointed to cabinet by Premier Ed Stelmach, first as Minister of Infrastructure until 2011, and then as Minister of Parks, Tourism and Recreation.

However, Hayden was narrowly defeated in the 2012 general election by Wildrose candidate Rick Strankman, famous for having gone to jail in protest of the Canadian Wheat Board. He was the first opposition MLA to represent the area since Gordon E. Taylor served as MLA for Drumheller in the 1970s.

In 2014 most of the Wildrose caucus, including Opposition Leader Danielle Smith, crossed the floor to the governing Progressive Conservatives in support of Jim Prentice's government. Strankman and four other Wildrose MLA's chose to remain with the party. In the 2015 general election, Strankman was re-elected by a much greater margin, as the Progressive Conservatives went down to a stunning defeat and Wildrose increased their seat count.

Wildrose subsequently merged with the Progressive Conservatives to form the United Conservative Party under Jason Kenney. While Strankman initially joined the party in 2017, he abandoned it in 2019 to sit as an independent after losing the party's nomination to stand as candidate in the upcoming general election.

== Legislative election results ==
=== 2004 ===
2004 Alberta general election
Party	Candidate	Votes	%
Progressive Conservative	Shirley McClellan	6,772	65.02
Alberta Alliance	Dave France	1,414	13.58
New Democratic	Richard Bough	869	8.34
Alberta Party	Eileen Walker	616	5.92
Separation	David Carnegie	465	4.47
Social Credit	Mary-Lou Kloppenburg	279	2.67
Total valid votes		10,415	
Rejected, spoiled, and declined		86	
Eligible electors / Turnout		20,653	50.85
Progressive Conservative pickup new district.			
Source(s) "Drumheller-Stettler Statement of Official Results 2004 Alberta general election" (PDF). Elections Alberta.

=== 2007 by-election ===
Alberta provincial by-election, June 12, 2007
Party	Candidate	Votes	%	±%
Progressive Conservative	Jack Hayden	4,180	57.65	−7.37
Liberal	Tom Dooley	993	13.69	–
Social Credit	Larry Davidson	852	11.75	9.08
Independent	John Rew	519	7.16	–
Alberta Alliance	Dave France	355	4.90	−8.68
Green	Jennifer Wigmore	249	3.43	–
New Democratic	Richard Bough	103	1.42	−6.92
Total		7,251	–	–
Rejected, spoiled, and declined		13	25	3
Eligible electors / turnout		22,509	32.31	–
Progressive Conservative hold		Swing		−10.53
Source(s) Alberta. Chief Electoral Officer (2007). Report on the June 12, 2007 By-elections: Calgary-Elbow & Drumheller-Stettler (Report). Edmonton: Legislative Assembly of Alberta; Chief Electoral Officer.

=== 2008 ===
2008 Alberta general election
Party	Candidate	Votes	%	±%
Progressive Conservative	Jack Hayden	6,986	68.90%	11.25%
Liberal	Tom Dooley	1,463	14.43%	0.73%
Wildrose Alliance	Dave France	1,062	10.47%	5.57%
Green	Amanda Bolton	353	3.48%	0.05%
New Democratic	Richard Bough	276	2.72%	1.30%
Total		10,140	–	–
Rejected, spoiled, and declined		27	7	1
Eligible electors / turnout		23,268	43.73%	–
Progressive Conservative hold		Swing		5.99%
Source(s) Office of the Chief Electoral Officer (2008). The Report on the March 3, 2008 Provincial General Election of the Twenty-Seventh Legislative Assembly. Edmonton: Alberta Legislative Assembly. pp. 402–407. ISSN 1483-1171.

=== 2012 ===
2012 Alberta general election
Party	Candidate	Votes	%	±%
Wildrose	Rick Strankman	7,452	49.38	+38.91
Progressive Conservative	Jack Hayden	6,587	43.65	-25.25
New Democratic	Aditya "Adi" Rao	408	2.70	-0.02
Liberal	Cam Roset	362	2.40	-12.03
Alberta Party	Andrew Berdahl	281	1.86	–
Total valid votes		15,090	–	–
Rejected, spoiled, and declined		49	57	2
Registered electors / turnout		24,788	61.31	+17.58
Wildrose gain from Progressive Conservative		Swing		+32.08
Source(s) Elections Alberta. "Electoral division results: Drumheller-Stettler". Chief Electoral Officer (2012). The Report of the Chief Electoral Officer on the 2011 Provincial Enumeration and Monday, April 23, 2012 Provincial General Election of the Twenty-eighth Legislative Assembly (PDF). Edmonton: Elections Alberta. pp. 342–344. OCLC 824182259.

=== 2015 ===
2015 Alberta general election
Party	Candidate	Votes	%	±%
Wildrose	Rick Strankman	7,570	47.66	-1.72
Progressive Conservative	Jack Hayden	5,388	33.92	-9.73
New Democratic	Emily Shannon	2,927	18.43	+15.73
Total valid votes		15,885	–	–
Rejected, spoiled, and declined		30	19	12
Eligible electors / Turnout		26,861	59.36	-1.95
Wildrose hold		Swing		+4.01
Source(s) Elections Alberta. "Electoral division results: Drumheller-Stettler".

=== 2019 ===
2019 Alberta general election
Party	Candidate	Votes	%	±%
United Conservative	Nate Horner	16,958	76.69%	-4.89%
Independent	Rick Strankman	1,841	8.33%	–
Alberta Party	Mark Nikota	1,461	6.61%	–
New Democratic	Holly Heffernan	1,446	6.54%	-11.89%
Alberta Independence	Jason Hushagen	230	1.04%	–
Alberta Advantage	Greg Herzog	176	0.80%	–
Total		22,112	–	–
Rejected, spoiled and declined		62	51	4
Eligible electors / turnout		29,679	74.73%	15.43%
United Conservative hold		Swing		27.31%
Source(s) Source: "59 - Drumheller-Stettler, 2019 Alberta general election". officialresults.elections.ab.ca. Elections Alberta. Alberta. Chief Electoral Officer (2019). 2019 General Election. A Report of the Chief Electoral Officer. Volume II (PDF) (Report). Vol. 2. Edmonton, Alta.: Elections Alberta. pp. 262–268. ISBN 978-1-988620-12-1.

=== 2023 ===
2023 Alberta general election
Party	Candidate	Votes	%	±%
United Conservative	Nate Horner	15,270	82.14	+5.45
New Democratic	Juliet Franklin	2,684	14.44	+7.90
Alberta Independence	Shannon Packham	382	2.05	+1.01
Wildrose Loyalty Coalition	Hannah Stretch Viens	150	0.81	–
Solidarity Movement	Carla Evers	104	0.56	–
Total		18,590	99.45	–
Rejected and declined		103	0.55	
Turnout		18,693	60.59	
Eligible voters		30,850		
United Conservative hold		Swing		-1.22
Source(s) Source: Elections Alberta

== Senate nominee election results ==
=== 2004 ===
2004 Senate nominee election results: Drumheller-Stettler				Turnout 50.52%	
Affiliation	Candidate	Votes	% votes	% ballots	Rank
Progressive Conservative	Bert Brown	4,705	17.12%	53.89%	1
Progressive Conservative	Betty Unger	3,888	14.15%	44.53%	2
Progressive Conservative	Cliff Breitkreuz	2,873	10.46%	32.91%	3
Progressive Conservative	Jim Silye	2,840	10.34%	32.53%	5
Independent	Link Byfield	2,826	10.28%	32.37%	4
Progressive Conservative	David Usherwood	2,798	10.18%	32.05%	6
Alberta Alliance	Vance Gough	2,208	8.04%	25.29%	8
Alberta Alliance	Michael Roth	2,153	7.84%	24.66%	7
Alberta Alliance	Gary Horan	1,923	6.99%	22.03%	10
Independent	Tom Sindlinger	1,265	4.60%	14.49%	9
Total votes		27,479	100%		
Total ballots		8,731	3.15 votes per ballot		
Rejected, spoiled and declined		1,703			

Voters had the option of selecting four candidates on the ballot

== Student vote results ==
=== 2004 ===
Participating schools
Byemoor School
C. J. Peacock School
Delia School
Jenner Colony School
New Brigden School
South Central High School
Stettler Middle School
Veteran School
William E. Hay Composite School
Youngstown School

On November 19, 2004, a student vote was conducted at participating Alberta schools to parallel the 2004 Alberta general election results. The vote was designed to educate students and simulate the electoral process for persons who have not yet reached the legal majority. The vote was conducted in 80 of the 83 provincial electoral districts with students voting for actual election candidates. Schools with a large student body that reside in another electoral district had the option to vote for candidates outside of the electoral district then where they were physically located.

2004 Alberta student vote results
Affiliation	Candidate	Votes	%
Progressive Conservative	Shirley McClellan	519	55.63%
NDP	Richard Bough	110	11.79%
Alberta Alliance	Dave France	91	9.75%
Separation	David Carnegie	86	9.22%
Alberta Party	Eileen Walker	83	8.90%
Social Credit	Mary-Lou Kloppenburg	44	4.71%
Total		933	100%
Rejected, spoiled and declined		36	

=== 2012 ===
2012 Alberta student vote results
Affiliation	Candidate	Votes	%
Progressive Conservative	Jack Hayden		%
Wildrose	Rick Strankman		
Liberal	Cam Roset		%
Alberta Party	Andrew Berdahl		
NDP	Aditya "Adi" Rao		%
Total			100%

== See also ==
- List of Alberta provincial electoral districts
- Canadian provincial electoral districts
