= John Gregory (politician) =

Canadian politician

Member of Parliament for The Battlefords
- In office March 1940 – June 1945
- Preceded by: Joseph Needham
- Succeeded by: Max Campbell

Personal details
- Born: John Albert Gregory; 9 September 1878 Exeter, Ontario, Canada
- Died: 22 January 1955 (aged 76)
- Party: Liberal
- Spouse(s): Ida C. Phillips m. 1 August 1905
- Profession: businessman, school principal

John Albert Gregory (9 September 1878 – 22 January 1955) was a Canadian politician, serving in municipal, provincial and federal governments. He was born in Exeter, Ontario and became a businessman and school principal by career. His father, Thomas Gregory, had been principal of the high school in Exter.

After attending schools in Exeter, Goderich and London, he moved to western Canada for law studies.

For twelve terms, he was mayor of the community of North Battleford, Saskatchewan. Gregory was also a Liberal member of the Legislative Assembly of Saskatchewan from 1934 to 1940 at The Battlefords provincial riding.

He was first elected as a Liberal party candidate for the House of Commons at The Battlefords riding in the 1940 general election. After serving one term in the House of Commons, Gregory was defeated by Max Campbell of the Co-operative Commonwealth Federation in the 1945 federal election.
