= Joseph Needham (politician) =

Canadian politician

Member of the Canadian Parliament for The Battlefords
- In office 1935–1940
- Preceded by: District was created in 1933
- Succeeded by: John Gregory

Personal details
- Born: March 23, 1876 Bramhall, Cheshire, England
- Died: April 8, 1953 (aged 77) New Westminster, British Columbia, Canada
- Party: Social Credit
- Spouse(s): Charlotte Sterne m. June 16, 1915

Joseph Needham (March 23, 1876 – April 8, 1953) was a Saskatchewan politician, clergyman and public administrator.

Needham was born in Bramhall, Cheshire, England and emigrated to Canada where he settled in Saskatchewan. Ordained as a Methodist minister, Needham entered commercial life in 1919 in Unity, Saskatchewan near the Alberta border working as an agent and secretary and eventually becoming a hospital superintendent.

He was elected to the House of Commons in the 1935 federal election as a member of the first federal parliamentary caucus Social Credit MPs in Ottawa. Needham was one of only two of the 17 Social Credit MPs to have been elected from outside of Alberta having been returned from the Saskatchewan riding of The Battlefords.

Needham served as president of the Social Credit League of Saskatchewan during this period and was the nominal leader of the provincial party during the 1938 provincial election which saw the party win 15% of the votes but only two seats - Needham did not seek a provincial seat himself and remained in the House of Commons. He was re-elected to the position of provincial president in 1939.

In 1938, Needham suggested that there was a strong sentiment in Saskatchewan for secession from Canada earning him a rebuke from Saskatchewan's Minister of Public Works who said "such talk is nonsense!" Later that year, while speaking in favour of a state run health care plan he criticized the Ontario government of Mitchell Hepburn for its treatment of the Dionne Quintuplets saying "I've often wondered why the province of Ontario bothered so much about the quintuplets. They are no more valuable than my children or yours, but because they could be commercialized, it was worthwhile to give them the best treatment money could buy. We should try to commercialize all our children and build up the strongest and most virile race in the world."

Needham also called for the diversion of money from the military to the poor. In 1938, he proposed a resolution in the House of Commons calling for a world conference of economists, educators and peace workers to examine removing the causes of war and "diverting defence expenditures from implements of destruction into the creation and distribution of their equivalent in gifts of goods to needy people, including so-called enemy peoples." He also called for the government to make farm implements free to farmers or give farmers compensation for their purchase.

He served a single term and was defeated in the 1940 federal election when he stood for re-election as a New Democracy candidate, which was the banner under which many Social Credit candidates ran that year. The 1940 election returned only 10 Social Credit/New Democracy MPs, all of whom represented Alberta.

Needham also served as president and de facto leader of the Social Credit Party of Saskatchewan from the mid-1930s until the mid-1940s but did not personally contest a seat in provincial elections. He died in an accident on April 8, 1953.
