= Spruce Grove-Sturgeon-St. Albert =

Defunct provincial electoral district in Alberta, Canada

Coordinates: 53.59°N 113.71°W

Alberta electoral district
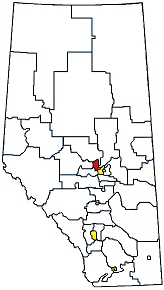
- 2004 boundaries

Defunct provincial electoral district
- Legislature: Legislative Assembly of Alberta
- District created: 1993
- District abolished: 2012
- First contested: 1993
- Last contested: 2008

Spruce Grove-Sturgeon-St. Albert was a provincial electoral district in Alberta, Canada, mandated to return a single member to the Legislative Assembly of Alberta using the first-past-the-post method of voting from 1993 to 2012.

== Electoral district history ==
The Spruce Grove-Sturgeon-St. Albert electoral district was created prior to the 1993 Alberta general election from the north-west corner of St. Albert and the Westlock-Sturgeon electoral district. The district was abolished during the 2010 electoral boundary re-distribution, with the southern portion becoming Spruce Grove-St. Albert and the northern portion becoming Barrhead-Morinville-Westlock.

=== Boundary history ===
75 Spruce Grove-Sturgeon-St. Albert 2003 boundaries
Bordering districts
North	East	West	South
Barrhead-Morinville-Westlock	Athabasca-Redwater, Barrhead-Morinville-Westlock, St. Albert, Edmonton-Calder	Whitecourt-Ste. Anne	Edmonton-Meadowlark, Stony Plain
riding map goes here		map in relation to other districts in Alberta goes here	
Legal description from Electoral Divisions Act, S.A. 2003, c. E-4.1
Starting at the east boundary of Sec. 15 and the north boundary of the south half of Sec. 14 in Twp. 57, Rge. 1 W5; 1. east along the north boundary of the south half of Secs. 14 and 13 in Rge. 1 W5 and Sec. 18 in Rge. 27 W4 to the east boundary of Sec. 18 in Twp. 57, Rge. 27 W4; 2. south along the east boundary of Secs. 18 and 7 to the north boundary of the south half of Sec. 8 in Twp. 57, Rge. 27 W4; 3. east along the north boundary of the south half of Sec. 8 in Twp. 57, Rge. 27 W4 to the east boundary of the west half of Sec. 8; 4. south along the east boundary to the north boundary of Sec. 5 in Twp. 57, Rge. 27 W4; 5. east along the north boundary of Secs. 5, 4, 3, 2 and 1 to the east boundary of Rge. 27 W4; 6. north along the east boundary of Rge. 27 to the north boundary of Sec. 7 in Twp. 57, Rge. 26 W4; 7. east along the north boundary of Secs. 7, 8 and 9 to the east boundary of the west half of Sec. 16; 8. north along the east boundary of the west half of Secs. 16, 21 and 28 to the north boundary of Sec. 28 in Twp. 57, Rge 26 W4; 9. east along the north boundary of Secs. 28 and 27 to the east boundary of the west half of Sec. 34, Twp. 57, Rge 26 W4; 10. north along the east boundary of the west half of Sec. 34 in Twp. 57 and Sec. 3 in Twp. 58 to the north boundary of Sec. 3 in Twp. 58, Rge. 26 W4; 11. east along the north boundary of Secs. 3, 2 and 1 in Rge. 26 W4 and Secs. 6 and 5 in Rge. 25 W4 to its intersection with the centre line of Highway 2; 12. south along the centre line of Highway 2 to the centre line of McKenney Avenue in the City of St. Albert; 13. westerly along the centre line of McKenney Avenue to the east boundary of river lot 20 as shown on plan 5126 T.R.; 14. southerly along the east boundary to the centre line of the Canadian National Railway; 15. westerly along the centre line of the railway to the St. Albert city boundary; 16. in a generally southerly direction along the St. Albert city boundary to the Edmonton city boundary; 17. in a westerly and southerly direction along the Edmonton city boundary to Highway 16A; 18. west along Highway 16A to the east Spruce Grove city boundary; 19. south, west, north and east along the Spruce Grove city boundary to the east boundary of Sec. 9 in Twp. 53, Rge. 27 W4; 20. north along the east boundary of Secs. 9, 16, 21, 28 and 33 in the Twp. and the east boundary of Secs. 4 and 9 in Twp. 54, Rge. 27 W4 to the north boundary of Sec. 9 in the Twp. (Highway 633); 21. west along Highway 633 to the east boundary of Sec. 14 in Twp. 54, Rge. 1 W5; 22. north along the east boundary of Secs. 14, 23, 26 and 35 in Twp. 54 and Secs. 2, 11, 14, 23, 26 and 35 in Twp. 55 to the intersection with the north shore of Sandy Lake and the west boundary of the Alexander Indian Reserve No. 134; 23. north along the west boundary of Indian Reserve No. 134 to the north boundary of Sec. 14, Twp. 56, Rge. 1 W5; 24. west along the north boundary of Sec. 14 to the east boundary of Sec. 22; 25. north along the east boundary of Secs. 22, 27 and 34 in Twp. 56 and Secs. 3, 10 and 15 in Twp. 57 to the starting point.

=== Members of the Legislative Assembly (MLAs) ===
Members of the Legislative Assembly for Spruce Grove-Sturgeon-St. Albert
Assembly	Years	Member	Party
See St. Albert electoral district from 1905-1993 and Westlock-Sturgeon electoral district from 1986-1993
23rd	1993–1997	Colleen Soetaert	Liberal
24th	1997–2001	Colleen Soetaert	Liberal
25th	2001–2004	Doug Horner	Progressive Conservative
26th	2004–2008	Doug Horner	Progressive Conservative
27th	2008–2012	Doug Horner	Progressive Conservative
See Spruce Grove-St. Albert electoral district from 2012-2019 and Barrhead-Morinville-Westlock electoral district from 2012-2019

== Legislative election results ==
=== 1993 ===
1993 Alberta general election
Party	Candidate	Votes	%	±%
Liberal	Colleen Soetaert	5,811	51.96%	–
Progressive Conservative	Norm Kluthe	4,428	39.59%	–
New Democratic	Steve Jacobs	813	7.27%	–
Natural Law	Randy T. Fritz	132	1.18%	–
Total		11,184	–	–
Rejected, spoiled and declined		19	–	–
Eligible electors / turnout		19,354	57.88%	–
Liberal pickup new district.				
Source(s) Source: "Spruce Grove-Sturgeon-St. Albert Official Results 1993 Alberta general election". Alberta Heritage Community Foundation.

=== 1997 ===
1997 Alberta general election
Party	Candidate	Votes	%	±%
Liberal	Colleen Soetaert	6,275	49.68%	-2.27%
Progressive Conservative	Gary Swinamer	5,388	42.66%	3.07%
Social Credit	Clinton Day	491	3.89%	–
New Democratic	Tom Elchuk	476	3.77%	-3.50%
Total		12,630	–	–
Rejected, spoiled and declined		43	–	–
Eligible electors / turnout		21,110	60.03%	2.15%
Liberal hold		Swing		-2.67%
Source(s) Source: "Spruce Grove-Sturgeon-St. Albert Official Results 1997 Alberta general election". Alberta Heritage Community Foundation.

=== 2001 ===
2001 Alberta general election
Party	Candidate	Votes	%	±%
Progressive Conservative	Doug Horner	8,010	55.40%	12.74%
Liberal	Colleen Soetaert	5,832	40.34%	-9.35%
New Democratic	Dale Apostal	616	4.26%	0.49%
Total		14,458	–	–
Rejected, spoiled and declined		44	–	–
Eligible electors / turnout		23,855	60.79%	0.76%
Progressive Conservative gain from Liberal		Swing		4.02%
Source(s) Source: "Spruce Grove-Sturgeon-St. Albert Official Results 2001 Alberta general election". Alberta Heritage Community Foundation.

=== 2004 ===
2004 Alberta general election
Party	Candidate	Votes	%	±%
Progressive Conservative	Doug Horner	6,139	45.11%	-10.30%
Liberal	Ray Boudreau	5,540	40.71%	0.37%
New Democratic	Dale Apostal	1,020	7.49%	3.23%
Alberta Alliance	Tim Friesen	741	5.44%	–
Social Credit	Glen Blaylock	170	1.25%	–
Total		13,610	–	–
Rejected, spoiled and declined		51	–	–
Eligible electors / turnout		27,709	49.30%	-11.49%
Progressive Conservative hold		Swing		-5.33%
Source(s) Source: "Spruce Grove-Sturgeon-St. Albert Official Results 2004 Alberta general election". Alberta Heritage Community Foundation.

=== 2008 ===
2008 Alberta general election
Party	Candidate	Votes	%	±%
Progressive Conservative	Doug Horner	9,369	60.83%	15.72%
Liberal	Ray Boudreau	4,528	29.40%	-11.31%
New Democratic	Peter Cross	960	6.23%	-1.26%
Green	Allen West	545	3.54%	–
Total		15,402	–	–
Rejected, spoiled and declined		70	–	–
Eligible electors / turnout		33,092	46.75%	-2.55%
Progressive Conservative hold		Swing		13.51%
Source(s) Source: "75 - Spruce Grove-Sturgeon-St. Albert Official Results 2008 Alberta general election". Elections Alberta.

== 2004 Senate nominee election results ==
2004 Senate nominee election results: Spruce Grove-Sturgeon-St. Albert				Turnout 49.35%	
Affiliation	Candidate	Votes	% votes	% ballots	Rank
Progressive Conservative	Betty Unger	5,344	15.79%	48.59%	2
Progressive Conservative	Cliff Breitkreuz	4,466	13.20%	40.60%	3
Independent	Link Byfield	4,282	12.65%	38.93%	4
Progressive Conservative	Bert Brown	3,914	11.57%	35.59%	1
Alberta Alliance	Michael Roth	3,007	8.89%	27.34%	7
Progressive Conservative	David Usherwood	2,960	8.75%	26.91%	6
Alberta Alliance	Gary Horan	2,538	7.50%	23.08%	10
Independent	Tom Sindlinger	2,526	7.46%	22.97%	9
Progressive Conservative	Jim Silye	2,455	7.25%	22.32%	5
Alberta Alliance	Vance Gough	2,351	6.94%	21.38%	8
Total votes		33,843	100%		
Total ballots		10,999	3.08 votes per ballot		
Rejected, spoiled and declined		2,674			

Voters had the option of selecting four candidates on the ballot

== 2004 student vote results ==
Participating schools
BrookWood School
Camilla School
Parkland Village School
Ronald Harvey Elementary
Sturgeon Composite High School
Sturgeon Heights School
St. Thomas Aquinas CHS

On November 19, 2004, a student vote was conducted at participating Alberta schools to parallel the 2004 Alberta general election results. The vote was designed to educate students and simulate the electoral process for persons who have not yet reached the legal majority. The vote was conducted in 80 of the 83 provincial electoral districts with students voting for actual election candidates. Schools with a large student body that reside in another electoral district had the option to vote for candidates outside of the electoral district then where they were physically located.

2004 Alberta student vote results
Affiliation	Candidate	Votes	%
Progressive Conservative	Doug Horner	322	38.61%
Liberal	Ray Boudreau	224	26.86%
NDP	Dale Apostal	181	21.70%
Alberta Alliance	Tim Friesen	58	6.95%
Social Credit	Glen Blaylock	49	5.88%
Total		834	100%
Rejected, spoiled and declined		11	

== See also ==
- List of Alberta provincial electoral districts
- Canadian provincial electoral districts
