= Kevin Sorenson =

Canadian politician

The Honourable Kevin A. Sorenson PC
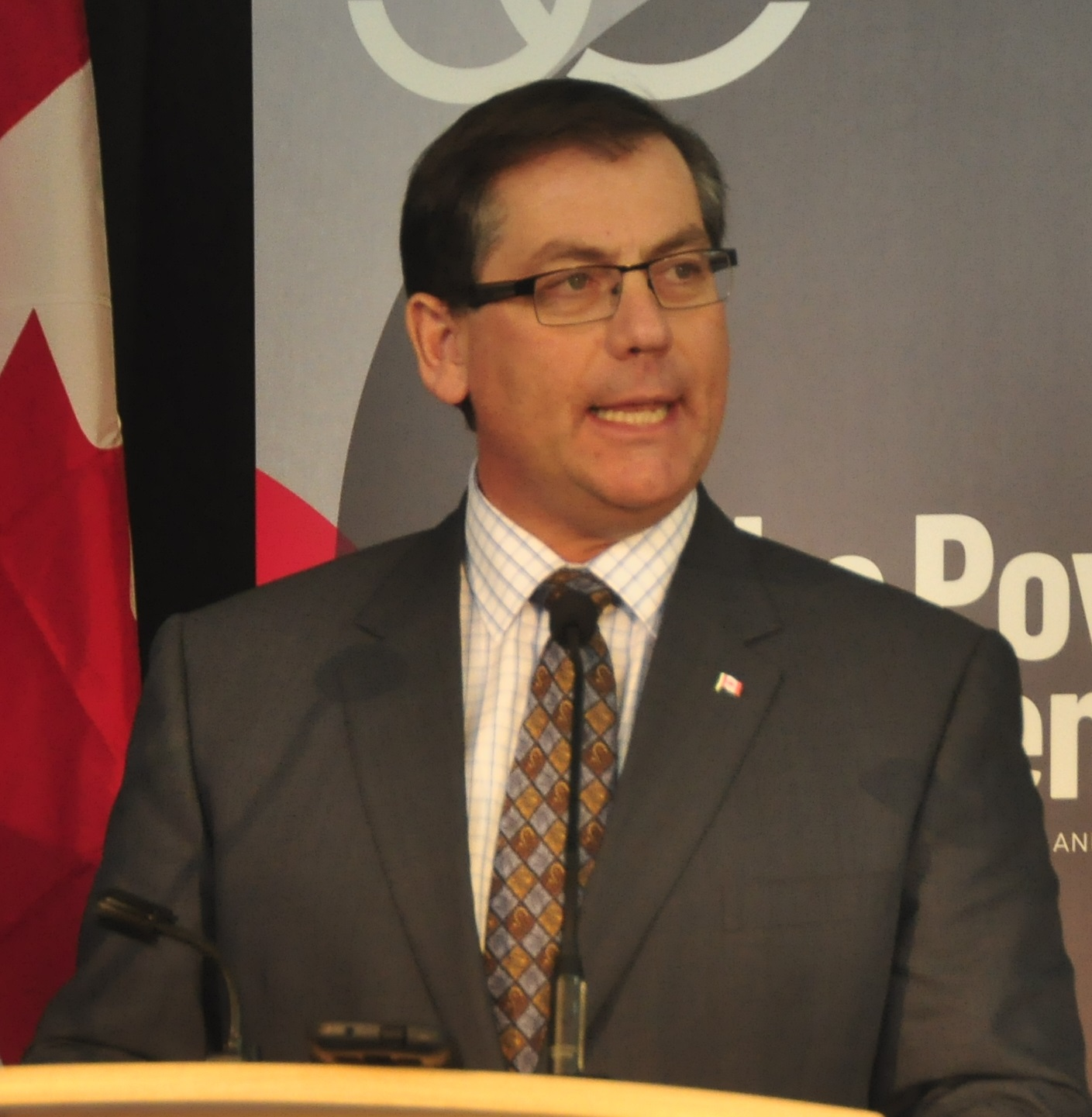
- Sorenson in 2014

Member of Parliament for Battle River-Crowfoot Crowfoot (2000-2015)
- In office November 27, 2000 – October 21, 2019
- Preceded by: Jack Ramsay
- Succeeded by: Damien Kurek

Personal details
- Born: November 3, 1958 (age 67) Killam, Alberta, Canada
- Party: Conservative
- Spouse: Darlene Sorenson
- Profession: businessman, farmer

Kevin A. Sorenson PC (born November 3, 1958) is a Canadian politician who represented the riding of Battle River-Crowfoot (known as Crowfoot from 2000 to 2015) in the House of Commons of Canada from 2000 to 2019, first as a member of the Canadian Alliance (2000–2003) and then as a member of the Conservative Party of Canada. He served as Minister of State for Finance under Prime Minister Stephen Harper from July 15, 2013 until the end of the Harper Government on November 4, 2015. He also served as the Opposition critic to the Solicitor General, the associate critic for Public Safety and Emergency Preparedness, and the deputy critic for Justice.

Sorenson represented a riding that is very conservative even by the standards of rural Alberta; most of his territory has been held by a centre-right MP without interruption since 1935. He won the riding by some of the largest margins ever recorded in Canadian politics. He was first elected in 2000, taking 70.5 percent of the vote. It would be the only time that he dropped below 80 percent of the vote. In the 2006 federal election, he was re-elected with 82.5 per cent of the popular vote, the highest total recorded by a Conservative candidate in that election.

Sorenson used to chair the Standing Committee on Public Safety and National Security and the Standing Committee on Public Accounts.

28th Canadian Ministry (2006–2015) – Cabinet of Stephen Harper
Cabinet post (1)
Predecessor	Office	Successor
Ted Menzies	Minister of State (Finance); 2013-2015	Post Abolished
Political offices
Preceded by David Christopherson	Chairman of the Standing Committee on Public Accounts; February 16, 2016 –	Succeeded by incumbent
Preceded by Bernard Patry	Chairman of the Standing Committee on Foreign Affairs; May 4, 2006 – March 8, 2010	Succeeded by Dean Allison
