= Rick Strankman =

Canadian politician (born 1953)

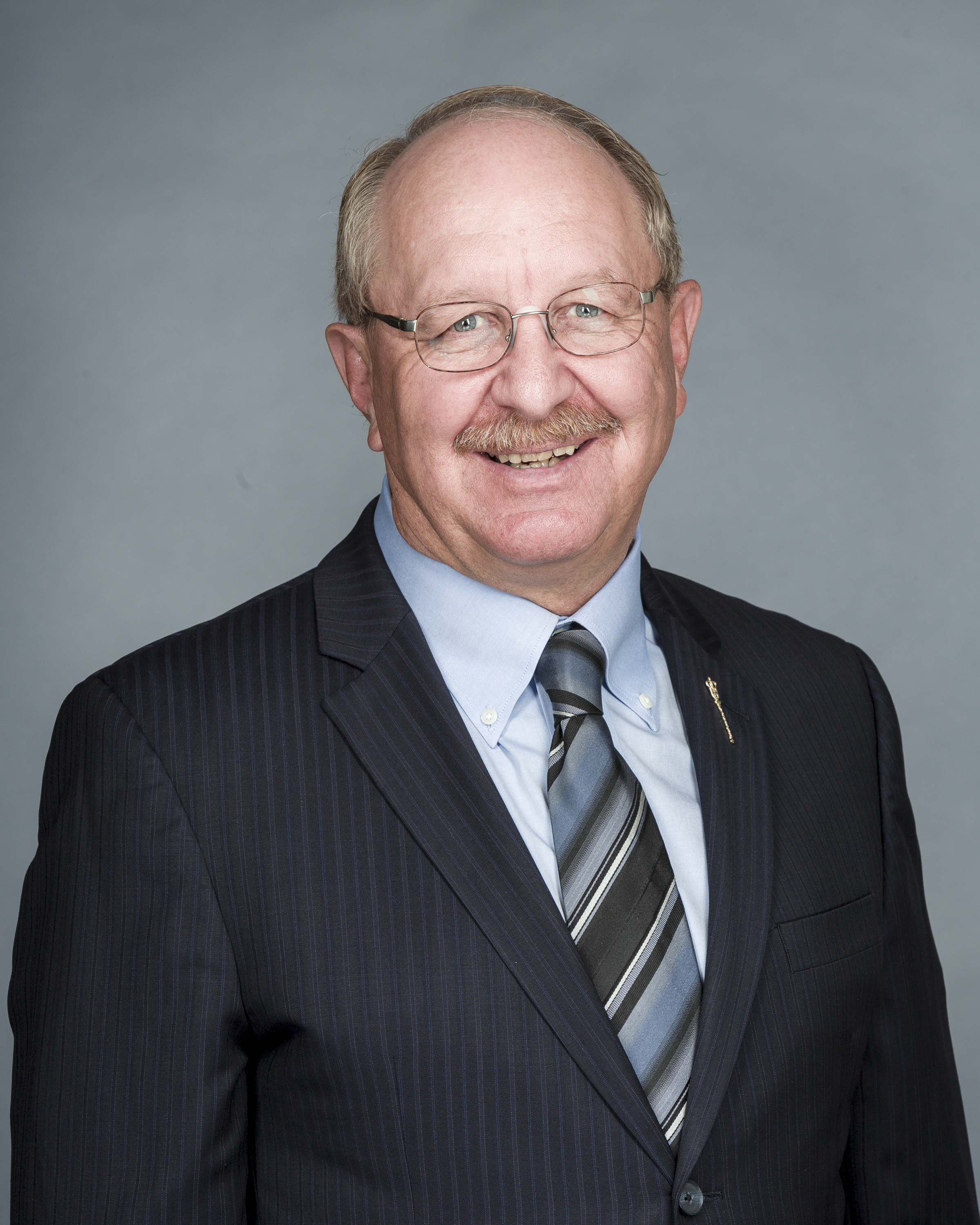

Member of the Legislative Assembly of Alberta for Drumheller-Stettler
- In office April 23, 2012 – April 16, 2019
- Preceded by: Jack Hayden
- Succeeded by: Nate Horner

Personal details
- Born: June 20, 1953 (age 72) Oyen, Alberta, Canada
- Party: Independent
- Other political affiliations: United Conservative Party (2017-2019); Wildrose Party (2012-2017)
- Spouse: Dianne Strankman
- Website: rickstrankman.ca

Richard Strankman (born June 20, 1953) is a Canadian politician who was an elected member to the Legislative Assembly of Alberta, representing the electoral district of Drumheller-Stettler, from 2012 to 2019.

Strankman serves on both the Standing Committee on Private Bills and the legislative policy committee on Alberta’s Economic Future. Strankman had served in several critic roles, including Tourism, Parks and Recreation, as well as Agriculture.

He resigned from the United Conservative caucus on January 15, 2019, and ran in the 2019 Alberta general election as an independent. Although he was not re-elected, he was one of only two candidates in the general election not representing the two largest parties (the UCP and the Alberta New Democratic Party) to finish in second place (the other such runner-up was incumbent Alberta Party MLA Greg Clark).

== Career ==
Strankman has owned and operated a farming business since 1973. From 1999 to 2011 he also volunteered as secretary/treasurer of the Western Barley Growers Association. Although initially interested in agriculture, Strankman became increasingly involved in politics and social activism in response to federal regulation of the agriculture industry, including legislation relating to the Canadian Wheat Board. His commitment to public service began early on and as a youth Strankman was honoured with the Queen’s scout award by Boy Scouts of Canada. Strankman also has a keen interest in aviation and has held a pilot’s licence and done aerial application since 1974.

Strankman was jailed in 2002 after being charged under the Customs Act for taking 756 bushels of wheat across the U.S. border in protest of the Canadian Wheat Board's monopoly. Strankman and other farmers arrested received a pardon from Prime Minister Stephen Harper on August 1, 2012, when the federal government's Marketing Freedom for Grain Farmers Act came into effect, which allowed producers to opt out of the Canadian Wheat Board and sell wheat on the open market.

At a reunion with 12 of 13 farmers who had been jailed for taking wheat across the border, Strankman stood by his decision to participate in the act of civil disobedience. He served one week of a 180-day sentence.

=== Climate Change Controversy ===
Strankman has been criticized for alleged Climate change denial. He has raised questions in the Legislative Assembly and in the media on whether anthropogenic climate change is real.

== Electoral history ==
=== 2019 general election ===
2019 Alberta general election: Drumheller-Stettler
Party	Candidate	Votes	%	±%
United Conservative	Nate Horner	16,958	76.69%	-4.89%
Independent	Rick Strankman	1,841	8.33%	–
Alberta Party	Mark Nikota	1,461	6.61%	–
New Democratic	Holly Heffernan	1,446	6.54%	-11.89%
Alberta Independence	Jason Hushagen	230	1.04%	–
Alberta Advantage	Greg Herzog	176	0.80%	–
Total		22,112	–	–
Rejected, spoiled and declined		62	51	4
Eligible electors / turnout		29,679	74.73%	15.43%
United Conservative hold		Swing		27.31%
Source(s) Source: "59 - Drumheller-Stettler, 2019 Alberta general election". officialresults.elections.ab.ca. Elections Alberta. Alberta. Chief Electoral Officer (2019). 2019 General Election. A Report of the Chief Electoral Officer. Volume II (PDF) (Report). Vol. 2. Edmonton, Alta.: Elections Alberta. pp. 262–268. ISBN 978-1-988620-12-1.

=== 2015 general election ===
2015 Alberta general election
Party	Candidate	Votes	%
Wildrose	Rick Strankman	7,563	47.6
Progressive Conservative	Jack Hayden	5,399	34.0
New Democratic	Emily Shannon	2,928	18.4

=== 2012 general election ===
2012 Alberta general election: Drumheller-Stettler
Party	Candidate	Votes	%	±%
Wildrose	Rick Strankman	7,452	49.38	+38.91
Progressive Conservative	Jack Hayden	6,587	43.65	-25.25
New Democratic	Aditya "Adi" Rao	408	2.70	-0.02
Liberal	Cam Roset	362	2.40	-12.03
Alberta Party	Andrew Berdahl	281	1.86	–
Total valid votes		15,090	–	–
Rejected, spoiled, and declined		49	57	2
Registered electors / turnout		24,788	61.31	+17.58
Wildrose gain from Progressive Conservative		Swing		+32.08
Source(s) Elections Alberta. "Electoral division results: Drumheller-Stettler". Chief Electoral Officer (2012). The Report of the Chief Electoral Officer on the 2011 Provincial Enumeration and Monday, April 23, 2012 Provincial General Election of the Twenty-eighth Legislative Assembly (PDF). Edmonton: Elections Alberta. pp. 342–344. OCLC 824182259.
