= Arnold Malone =

Canadian politician

Member of Parliament for Battle River
- In office 8 July 1974 – 26 March 1979
- Preceded by: Harry Kuntz
- Succeeded by: District abolished

Member of Parliament for Crowfoot
- In office 22 May 1979 – 8 September 1993
- Preceded by: Jack Horner
- Succeeded by: Jack Ramsay

Personal details
- Born: 9 December 1937 (age 88) Rosalind, Alberta, Canada
- Party: Progressive Conservative
- Spouse: Susan Malone
- Children: Michael Malone
- Profession: Educator, public servant

Arnold John Malone (born 9 December 1937) was a Progressive Conservative party member of the House of Commons of Canada. He was a public servant by career.

He initially represented the Alberta riding of Battle River where he was first elected in the 1974 federal election. Battle River was abolished before the 1979 election, and most of its territory was merged into neighboring Crowfoot. Malone was elected from Crowfoot in 1979, 1980, 1984 and 1988 federal elections. He served in the 30th, 31st, 32nd, 33rd and 34th Canadian Parliaments before leaving federal politics. During his term in office, he served as chair of the National Defence Committee.

As of 2015, Malone resides in Invermere, British Columbia, and writes a column for the weekly newspaper Columbia Valley Pioneer.
