= Shirley McClellan =

Canadian politician

The Honourable Doctor Shirley McClellan ECA

Member of the Legislative Assembly of Alberta for Drumheller-Stettler Drumheller-Chinook (1997–2004) Chinook (1987–1997)
- In office November 23, 1987 – January 15, 2007
- Preceded by: Henry Kroeger
- Succeeded by: Jack Hayden

5th Deputy Premier of Alberta
- In office March 16, 2001 – December 15, 2006
- Preceded by: Ken Kowalski
- Succeeded by: Ron Stevens

Personal details
- Born: January 22, 1942 (age 84) Hanna, Alberta
- Party: Progressive Conservative Association of Alberta
- Occupation: Farmer

Shirley McClellan ECA (born 22 January 1942) is a Canadian politician who was a long serving member of the Legislative Assembly of Alberta for 20 years. She served as Deputy Premier.

== Early life ==
McClellan was born in Hanna, Alberta, Canada, on January 22, 1942.

== Member of the Legislative Assembly of Alberta ==
McClellan was first elected to the Alberta Legislature in a by-election held on November 23, 1987.

In 1989, she was re-elected to a second term, and appointed Associate Minister of Agriculture. On February 24, 1992, she was appointed Minister Responsible for Rural Development (gaining the style "the Honourable" for the duration of her membership in the Executive Council of Alberta). On December 15, 1992, McClellan was appointed Minister of Health for the province.

Shirley McClellan was re-elected to a third term on June 15, 1993. On June 30, 1993, she was re-appointed Minister of Health as well as Minister Responsible for the Wild Rose Foundation. On December 15, 1993, she was appointed Minister Responsible for the Alberta Alcohol and Drug Abuse Commission. On October 21, 1994, she was appointed Minister Responsible for the Seniors Advisory Council for Alberta. On May 31, 1996, McClellan was appointed Minister of Community Development.

On March 11, 1997, McClellan was re-elected to a fourth term and re-appointed Minister of Community Development on March 26, 1997. On May 26, 1999, McClellan was appointed Minister of International and Intergovernmental Relations. She was also appointed as a member of Agenda and Priorities and the Standing Policy Committee on Finance and Intergovernmental Relations.

On March 12, 2001, McClellan was elected for a fifth term and on March 19, 2001, was appointed Deputy Premier and Minister of Agriculture, Food and Rural Development. She was also the vice-chair of the Agenda and Priorities Committee and a member of the Standing Policy Committee on Agriculture and Municipal Affairs.

On November 22, 2004, McClellan was elected to her sixth, and final, term as Member of the Legislative Assembly representing the constituency of Drumheller-Stettler. In addition to Deputy Premier and Minister of Finance, she served the Assembly as Chair of the Treasury Board and vice-chair of Agenda and Priorities Committee.

McClellan was actively involved in bringing further education to rural areas, serving as a member of the board of directors for the Alberta Association of Continuing Education (AACE) and the Canadian Association for Continuing Education (CACE). She was co-ordinator of the Big Country Further Education Council for 12 years, a representative of the Ministers Advisory Committee on Further Education for five years, and sat on the Ministers Advisory Committee on College Affairs for two years.

She resigned her seat in the legislature on January 15, 2007, the same day that former premier Ralph Klein resigned his.

On February 5, 2011, McClellan was selected to be the 12th Chancellor of the University of Lethbridge by the Senate of that institution. Her term commenced March 15, 2011.
