= John Vallance (politician) =

Canadian politician

Member of Parliament for South Battleford
- In office 1925–1935
- Preceded by: constituency established
- Succeeded by: constituency abolished

Personal details
- Born: March 11, 1883; Scotland
- Died: May 24, 1963 (aged 80)
- Political party: Liberal

John Vallance (March 11, 1883 – May 24, 1963) was a Canadian politician.

Vallance was born in Scotland and immigrated to Canada in 1906. He homesteaded in central Saskatchewan in 1907, two years after the province was created, settling ten miles south of Luseland, Saskatchewan.

He was elected to the House of Commons of Canada in the 1925 federal election as the Liberal Member of Parliament for South Battleford and was re-elected in 1926 and 1930.

After being defeated in the 1935 federal election in the new riding of The Battlefords, he was recruited by the new federal Minister of Agriculture, James Garfield Gardiner, to serve on the Prairie Farm Rehabilitation Administration in 1936 serving as Superintendent of Water Development and moving to Regina, Saskatchewan. Vallance remained with the PFRA until 1943 when he was appointed Assistant Commissioner of the Board of Grain Commissioners from 1943 and, in 1948, became Commissioner of the body and remained in that position until 1955.
