= Crowfoot (electoral district) =

Former federal electoral district in Alberta, Canada

Alberta electoral district
- Crowfoot in relation to the other Alberta ridings (2003 boundaries)

Defunct federal electoral district
- Legislature: House of Commons
- District created: 1966
- District abolished: 2013
- First contested: 1968
- Last contested: 2011
- District webpage: profile, map

Demographics
- Population (2011): 125,481
- Electors (2011): 87,897
- Area (km²): 42,810.46
- Census division(s): Division No. 5, Division No. 6, Division No. 7, Division No. 10
- Census subdivision(s): Rocky View County, Camrose, Mountain View County, Strathmore, Chestermere, Wheatland County, Drumheller, Camrose County, Stettler, Kneehill County

Crowfoot was a federal electoral district in Alberta, Canada, that was represented in the House of Commons of Canada from 1968 to 2015.

It was located in the central part of the province, and is named in honour of Chief Crowfoot, leader of the Blackfoot First Nations in the 19th century.

Even by the standards of rural Alberta, Crowfoot was a strongly conservative riding. The major right-wing party of the day — Progressive Conservative (1968–1993), Reform (1993–2000), Canadian Alliance (2000–2003), and Conservative (after 2003) — won every election in this riding, usually by some of the largest recorded margins in Canadian politics. As a measure of how conservative this riding is, Jack Horner, the riding's original member, crossed the floor to the Liberals in 1977, only to tumble to only 18 percent of the vote in 1979.

This electoral district was also home to the largest margin of victory in any federal riding in the 2004 and 2006 federal elections. Conservative candidate Kevin Sorenson won 37,649 votes, or 80.2% of the riding's total in 2004. This represented a difference of 34,034 votes, or 72.5%, from the candidate with the riding's second most votes, Liberal Adam Campbell who only received 3,615 votes, or 7.7% of the riding's votes. It was the riding with the highest Conservative vote in the 2004 and 2006 elections. In 2006, Sorenson increased his vote even further, to 43,009 votes, 82.5% of the total.

== Geography ==
The district included the City of Camrose; the Town of Drumheller; the Municipal District of Acadia No. 34; Wheatland County; Kneehill County; Starland County; the County of Stettler No. 6; the County of Paintearth No. 18; Camrose County; and all of Alberta's three special areas (Nos. 2, 3 and 4).

== History ==
This riding was created in 1966 from parts of Medicine Hat, Acadia, Bow River, and Macleod ridings. At the time, the riding contained the rural areas south and east of Calgary, extending as far south as Claresholm and as far east as the Saskatchewan border. It also extended into the rural area of east-central Alberta as far north as Coronation.

Redistribution in 1976 altered the riding drastically. The riding lost all of its territory south of the Red Deer River, which was transferred to ridings of Bow River and Medicine Hat. In turn, the riding moved northward, taking up most of rural east-central Alberta, adding much of what was previously in the riding of Battle River. The riding would now extend as far north as the Highway 13 corridor, including Camrose.

The 1987 redistribution added the Drumheller area to the riding, as well as the Red Deer River valley area north of Drumheller from the ridings of Red Deer and Bow River. In turn, the riding lost most of the Highway 13 corridor in the north to Vegreville except for the Camrose area.

The 1996 redistribution added the Highway 13 corridor back to the riding.

In 2003, parts of Wild Rose riding were added, including the eastern exurbs of Calgary, like Chestemere. The riding subsequently lost the Highway 21 corridor east of Red Deer to the ridings of Red Deer and Wetaskiwin, and lost the Highway 13 corridor (except for Camrose) to Vegreville—Wainwright.

It was abolished in 2012. Most of the riding's eastern portion became Battle River—Crowfoot, with much of the western portion transferring to Bow River and Red Deer—Mountain View. Some outer western portions of the riding that had been annexed into Calgary joined Calgary Shepard and Calgary Forest Lawn.

=== Historical boundaries ===
1966 representation order

1976 representation order

1987 representation order

1996 representation order

2003 representation order

=== Members of Parliament ===
Parliament	Years	Member	Party
Crowfoot; Riding created from Medicine Hat, Acadia, Bow River and Macleod
28th	1968–1972	Jack Horner	Progressive Conservative
29th	1972–1974	Jack Horner	Progressive Conservative
30th	1974–1977	Jack Horner	Progressive Conservative
30th	1977–1979	Jack Horner	Liberal
31st	1979–1980	Arnold Malone	Progressive Conservative
32nd	1980–1984	Arnold Malone	Progressive Conservative
33rd	1984–1988	Arnold Malone	Progressive Conservative
34th	1988–1993	Arnold Malone	Progressive Conservative
35th	1993–1997	Jack Ramsay	Reform
36th	1997–2000	Jack Ramsay	Reform
36th	2000–2000	Jack Ramsay	Independent Canadian Alliance
36th	2000–2000	Jack Ramsay	Independent
37th	2000–2003	Kevin Sorenson	Alliance
37th	2003–2004	Kevin Sorenson	Conservative
38th	2004–2006	Kevin Sorenson	Conservative
39th	2006–2008	Kevin Sorenson	Conservative
40th	2008–2011	Kevin Sorenson	Conservative
41st	2011–2015	Kevin Sorenson	Conservative
Riding dissolved into Battle River—Crowfoot, Bow River, Red Deer—Mountain View, Calgary Shepard and Calgary Forest Lawn

== Election results ==
=== 2011 ===
2011 Canadian federal election
Party	Candidate	Votes	%	±%	Expenditures
Conservative	Kevin Sorenson	44,115	83.99	+1.96	$38,136.33
New Democratic	Ellen Parker	4,805	9.15	+1.26	$10,006.52
Green	Konrad Schellenberg	1,711	3.26	–2.73	none listed
Liberal	Omar Harb	1,224	2.33	–1.75	$4,588.85
Independent	John C. Turner	463	0.88	–	$2,666.70
Christian Heritage	Gerard Groenendijk	204	0.39	–	none listed
Total valid votes/expense limit		52,522	99.75	–	$110,090.77
Total rejected ballots		131	0.25	–0.01	
Turnout		52,653	59.24	+4.38	
Eligible voters		88,881			
Conservative hold		Swing		+1.61	
Source: Elections Canada

=== 2008 ===
2008 Canadian federal election
Party	Candidate	Votes	%	±%	Expenditures
Conservative	Kevin Sorenson	39,342	82.03	–0.53	$57,134.49
New Democratic	Ellen Parker	3,783	7.89	+0.49	$5,163.95
Green	Kaitlin Kettenbach	2,875	5.99	+1.51	none listed
Liberal	Sharon L. Howe	1,958	4.08	–1.48	$1,396.63
Total valid votes/expense limit		47,958	99.74	–	$106,273.30
Total rejected ballots		127	0.26	–0.01	
Turnout		48,085	54.86	–9.95	
Eligible voters		87,644			
Conservative hold		Swing		–0.51	
Source: Elections Canada

=== 2006 ===
2006 Canadian federal election
Party	Candidate	Votes	%	±%	Expenditures
Conservative	Kevin Sorenson	43,210	82.56	+2.35	$31,639.90
New Democratic	Ellen Parker	3,875	7.40	+0.50	$4,016.35
Liberal	Adam Campbell	2,908	5.56	–2.14	$602.29
Green	Cameron Wigmore	2,347	4.48	+0.66	$198.78
Total valid votes/expense limit		52,340	99.73	–	$95,708.12
Total rejected ballots		142	0.27	+0.08	
Turnout		52,482	64.81	+2.45	
Eligible voters		80,980			
Conservative hold		Swing		+0.92	
Source: Elections Canada

=== 2004 ===
2004 Canadian federal election
Party	Candidate	Votes	%	±%	Expenditures
Conservative	Kevin Sorenson	37,649	80.21	–4.51	$42,984.85
Liberal	Adam Campbell	3,615	7.70	+1.51	$3,109.69
New Democratic	Ellen Parker	3,241	6.90	+3.86	$2,538.61
Green	Arnold Baker	1,795	3.82	–	$193.43
Marijuana	Max Leonard Cornelssen	639	1.36	–	none listed
Total valid votes/expense limit		46,939	99.81	–	$90,518.84
Total rejected ballots		89	0.19	–0.05	
Turnout		47,028	62.36	–3.82	
Eligible voters		75,409			
Conservative hold		Swing		–3.01	
Source: Elections Canada

=== 2000 ===
2000 Canadian federal election
Party	Candidate	Votes	%	±%	Expenditures
Alliance	Kevin Sorenson	33,767	70.56	–0.43	$44,001
Progressive Conservative	Verlyn Olson	6,778	14.16	–1.34	$18,591
Liberal	Orest Werezak	2,964	6.19	–3.52	$2,938
Independent	Jack Ramsay	2,668	5.57	–	$18,085
New Democratic	Jay Russell	1,457	3.04	–0.75	$788
Independent	Valerie Doreen Morrow	223	0.47	–	$7,959
Total valid votes		47,857	99.76		
Total rejected ballots		117	0.24	+0.06	
Turnout		47,974	66.18	+2.12	
Eligible voters		72,488			
Alliance hold		Swing		–0.45	
Source: Elections Canada

2000 federal election redistributed results
Party	Vote	%
Canadian Alliance	33,988	71.72
Progressive Conservative	6,641	14.01
Liberal	3,094	6.53
New Democratic	1,396	2.95
Independents	2,269	4.79

=== 1997 ===
1997 Canadian federal election
Party	Candidate	Votes	%	±%	Expenditures
Reform	Jack Ramsay	30,589	70.99	+5.01	$48,007
Progressive Conservative	Paul Marshall	6,679	15.50	–2.47	$18,052
Liberal	Redford W. Peeples	4,185	9.71	–2.88	$5,178
New Democratic	William M. Scotten	1,635	3.79	+1.39	$859
Total valid votes		43,088	99.82		
Total rejected ballots		79	0.18	–0.04	
Turnout		43,167	64.06	–7.28	
Eligible voters		67,387			
Reform hold		Swing		+3.74	
Source: Elections Canada

=== 1993 ===
1993 Canadian federal election
Party	Candidate	Votes	%	±%
Reform	Jack Ramsay	23,611	65.98	+33.93
Progressive Conservative	Brian Heidecker	6,431	17.97	–35.71
Liberal	Darryl Sandford	4,506	12.59	+5.99
New Democratic	Berend J. Wilting	860	2.40	–5.27
Natural Law	Alan J. Livingston	263	0.73	–
Independent	Anita Ashmore	114	0.32	–
Total valid votes		35,785	99.78	
Total rejected ballots		80	0.22	+0.00
Turnout		35,865	71.34	–6.94
Eligible voters		50,275		
Reform gain from Progressive Conservative		Swing		+34.82
Source: Elections Canada

=== 1988 ===
1988 Canadian federal election
Party	Candidate	Votes	%	±%
Progressive Conservative	Arnold Malone	19,079	53.68	–24.15
Reform	Jack Ramsay	11,392	32.05	–
New Democratic	Fred Rappel	2,725	7.67	–1.66
Liberal	Doug Moe	2,344	6.60	–0.75
Total valid votes		35,540	99.78	
Total rejected ballots		77	0.22	–0.01
Turnout		35,617	78.28	+5.10
Eligible voters		45,499		
Progressive Conservative hold		Swing		–28.10
Source: Elections Canada

=== 1984 ===
1984 Canadian federal election
Party	Candidate	Votes	%	±%
Progressive Conservative	Arnold Malone	26,291	77.83	+1.22
New Democratic	L. Gladys Creasy	3,153	9.33	+3.09
Liberal	Vange MacNaughton	2,483	7.35	–8.18
Confederation of Regions	Joe Domanski	1,559	4.62	–
Social Credit	Arthur E. Robinson	294	0.87	–0.75
Total valid votes		33,780	99.77	
Total rejected ballots		78	0.23	+0.00
Turnout		33,858	73.18	+2.37
Eligible voters		46,266		
Progressive Conservative hold		Swing		–0.94
Source: Elections Canada

=== 1980 ===
1980 Canadian federal election
Party	Candidate	Votes	%	±%
Progressive Conservative	Arnold Malone	23,491	76.61	–0.51
Liberal	Jack Horner	4,761	15.53	–2.67
New Democratic	Roger Milbrandt	1,912	6.24	+1.56
Social Credit	Jim Green	498	1.62	–
Total valid votes		30,662	99.77	
Total rejected ballots		71	0.23	+0.07
Turnout		30,733	70.81	–7.06
Eligible voters		43,402		
Progressive Conservative hold		Swing		+1.59
Source: Elections Canada

=== 1979 ===
1979 Canadian federal election
Party	Candidate	Votes	%	±%
Progressive Conservative	Arnold Malone	25,202	77.12	+1.61
Liberal	Jack Horner	5,947	18.20	+3.65
New Democratic	Roger Milbrandt	1,529	4.68	+0.20
Total valid votes		32,678	99.84	
Total rejected ballots		53	0.16	–0.06
Turnout		32,731	77.87	+8.70
Eligible voters		42,032		
Progressive Conservative hold		Swing		+2.63
Source: Elections Canada

=== 1974 ===
1974 Canadian federal election
Party	Candidate	Votes	%	±%
Progressive Conservative	Jack Horner	18,048	75.51	–0.03
Liberal	Ernie Patterson	3,477	14.55	+4.07
Social Credit	Jim Green	1,307	5.47	–1.68
New Democratic	Muriel McCreary	1,071	4.48	–2.34
Total valid votes		23,903	99.78	
Total rejected ballots		53	0.22	–0.82
Turnout		23,956	69.17	–7.25
Eligible voters		34,635		
Progressive Conservative hold		Swing		–2.05
Source: Library of Parliament

=== 1972 ===
1972 Canadian federal election
Party	Candidate	Votes	%	±%
Progressive Conservative	Jack Horner	18,667	75.54	+2.09
Liberal	Andy McAlister	2,591	10.48	–10.80
Social Credit	Jim Green	1,768	7.15	–
New Democratic	Gloria Jean Ann McGowan	1,686	6.82	+1.55
Total valid votes		24,712	98.96	
Total rejected ballots		260	1.04	+0.57
Turnout		24,972	76.42	–0.14
Eligible voters		32,679		
Progressive Conservative hold		Swing		+6.45
Source: Library of Parliament

=== 1968 ===
1968 Canadian federal election
Party	Candidate	Votes	%
Progressive Conservative	Jack Horner	16,508	73.45
Liberal	Noel Sharp	4,783	21.28
New Democratic	Stuart McCready	1,185	5.27
Total valid votes		22,476	99.53
Total rejected ballots		106	0.47
Turnout		22,582	76.56
Eligible voters		29,497	
Source: Library of Parliament

== See also ==
- List of Canadian electoral districts
- Historical federal electoral districts of Canada
