= Spruce Grove-St. Albert =

Defunct provincial electoral district in Alberta, Canada

Alberta electoral district
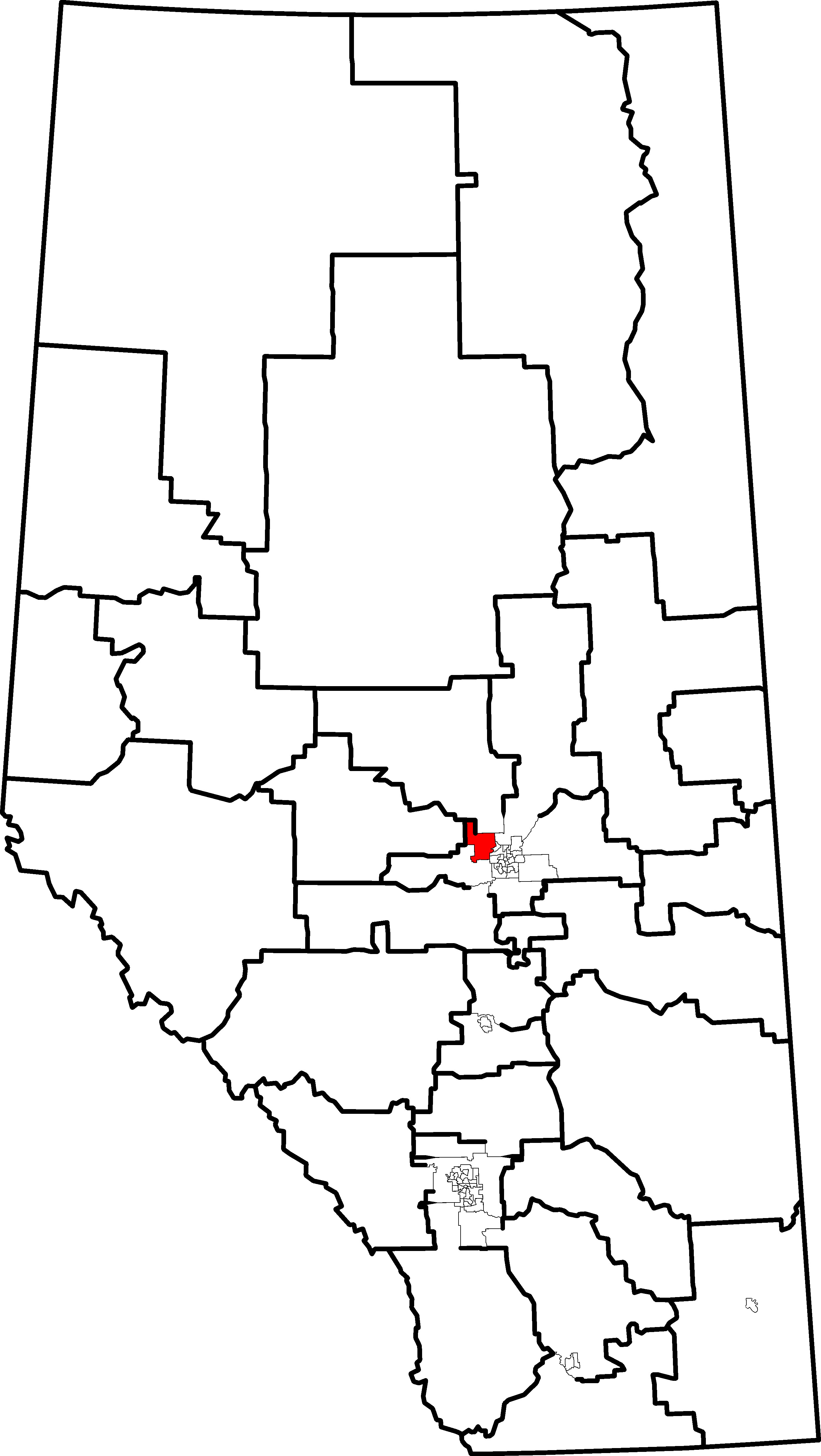
- 2010 boundaries

Defunct provincial electoral district
- Legislature: Legislative Assembly of Alberta
- District created: 2010
- District abolished: 2017
- First contested: 2012
- Last contested: 2015

Spruce Grove-St. Albert was a provincial electoral district in Alberta, Canada, mandated to return a single member to the Legislative Assembly of Alberta under the first past the post voting system from 2012 to 2019.

== History ==
The electoral district was created in the 2010 electoral boundary re-distribution from the electoral old district of Spruce Grove-Sturgeon-St. Albert. A large portion of land was moved into Barrhead-Morinville-Westlock that was north of Township Road 552 and Alexander First Nation as well as land lying east of the Reserve.

=== Boundary history ===
79 Spruce Grove-St. Albert 2010 boundaries
Bordering districts
North	East	West	South
Barrhead-Morinville-Westlock	Edmonton-Calder, Edmonton-Meadowlark and St. Albert	Whitecourt-Ste. Anne	Stony Plain
Note: Boundary descriptions were not used in the 2010 redistribution.

=== Representation history ===
Members of the Legislative Assembly for Spruce Grove-St. Albert
Assembly	Years	Member	Party
See Spruce Grove-Sturgeon-St. Albert 1993-2012
28th	2012–2015	Doug Horner	Progressive Conservative
29th	2015–2019	Trevor Horne (Note: Horne is now known as Vivienne Horne due to gender transition.)	New Democratic
See Spruce Grove-Stony Plain, Lac Ste. Anne-Parkland and St. Albert 2019-

== Legislative election results ==
=== 2012 ===
2012 Alberta general election
Party	Candidate	Votes	%	±%
Progressive Conservative	Doug Horner	10,812	54.88%	–
Wildrose	Travis Hughes	5,354	27.17%	–
New Democratic	Juliette J. Trudeau	1,779	9.03%	–
Liberal	Chris Austin	1,757	8.92%	–
Total		19,702	–	–
Rejected, spoiled and declined		81	–	–
Eligible electors / turnout		35,073	56.41%	–
Progressive Conservative pickup new district.				
Source(s) Source: "Elections Alberta 2012 General Election". Elections Alberta.

=== 2015 ===
2015 Alberta general election
Party	Candidate	Votes	%	±%
New Democratic	Trevor Horne	11,546	46.55%	37.52%
Progressive Conservative	Rus Matichuk	6,362	25.65%	-29.23%
Wildrose	Jaye Walter	4,631	18.67%	-8.51%
Alberta Party	Gary Hanna	1,081	4.36%	–
Liberal	Reg Lukasik	916	3.69%	-5.23%
Green	Brendon Greene	269	1.08%	–
Total		24,805	–	–
Rejected, spoiled and declined		44	–	–
Eligible electors / turnout		46,603	53.32%	-3.08%
New Democratic gain from Progressive Conservative		Swing		-3.40%
Source(s) Source: "Spruce Grove-St. Albert 2015 General Election Results". Elections Alberta.

== Student vote results ==
=== 2012 ===
2012 Alberta student vote results
Affiliation	Candidate	Votes	%
Progressive Conservative	Doug Horner		%
Wildrose	Travis Hughes		
Liberal	Chris Austin		%
NDP	Juliette Trudeau		%
Total			100%

== See also ==
- List of Alberta provincial electoral districts
- Canadian provincial electoral districts
