= Battleford—Kindersley =

Former federal electoral district in Saskatchewan, Canada

Battleford—Kindersley was a federal electoral district (riding) n Saskatchewan, Canada, that was represented in the House of Commons of Canada from 1968 to 1979. This riding was created in 1966 from parts of Kindersley, The Battlefords and Rosetown—Biggar ridings.

It was abolished in 1976 when it was redistributed into Kindersley—Lloydminster and The Battlefords—Meadow Lake ridings.

== Election results ==
1968 Canadian federal election
Party	Candidate	Votes
New Democratic	THOMSON, Rod	10,583
Progressive Conservative	CANTELON, Reg	9,941
Liberal	STEIERT, Anthony C.	7,872

1972 Canadian federal election
Party	Candidate	Votes
Progressive Conservative	HORNER, Norval	10,373
New Democratic	THOMSON, Rod	10,122
Liberal	KELLER, Edward C.	8,286
Social Credit	LEESON, Madge	498

1974 Canadian federal election
Party	Candidate	Votes
Liberal	MCISAAC, J. Clifford	10,751
Progressive Conservative	HORNER, Norval	10,666
New Democratic	THOMSON, Rod	7,711

== See also ==
- List of Canadian electoral districts
- Historical federal electoral districts of Canada
