= Norval Horner =

Canadian politician

Member of the Canadian Parliament for Battleford—Kindersley
- In office 1972–1974
- Preceded by: Rod Thomson
- Succeeded by: Joseph McIsaac

Personal details
- Born: August 21, 1930 Blaine Lake, Saskatchewan, Canada
- Died: April 3, 2014 (aged 83) Nanaimo, British Columbia, Canada
- Party: Progressive Conservative Party of Canada
- Relations: Hugh Horner (brother); Jack Horner (brother); Doug Horner (nephew); Albert Horner (Cousin)
- Children: eight
- Parent: Ralph Horner (father)

Norval Alexander Horner (August 21, 1930 – April 3, 2014) was a Canadian politician and former member of the House of Commons of Canada.

Horner earned teaching and engineering degrees from the University of Saskatchewan and worked as a businessman, farmer, and school principal in Alberta and Saskatchewan.

He was elected to the House of Commons in the 1972 federal election as the Progressive Conservative Member of Parliament for Battleford—Kindersley, Saskatchewan but was defeated two years later in the 1974 federal election by less than 100 votes.

Two of Horner's brothers, Hugh Horner and Jack Horner, were also Members of Parliament while his father, Ralph Horner, served as a Senator (Jack Horner and Norval served in the House of Commons at the same time). A cousin, Albert Horner, was also an MP prior to Norval's election.

Horner retired to Vancouver Island where he voiced his opinions on political issues, often at odds with the contemporary Conservative Party, advocating an increase in the minimum wage and arguing in favour of anti-poverty measures in order to combat crime instead of mandatory minimum sentences and other law and order proposals.

Horner has 8 children, 7 grandchildren, and 3 great-grandchildren. He died on April 3, 2014, in British Columbia.
