= South Battleford =

South Battleford was a federal electoral district in Saskatchewan, Canada, that was represented in the House of Commons of Canada from 1925 to 1935. This riding was created in 1924 from parts of Battleford and Kindersley ridings.

It was abolished in 1933 when it was redistributed into Kindersley and The Battlefords ridings.

== Election results ==
1925 Canadian federal election
Party	Candidate	Votes
Liberal	VALLANCE, John	4,364
Progressive	BINGHAM, Sydney	3,252
Conservative	HAGERMAN, James Arnold	2,646

1926 Canadian federal election
Party	Candidate	Votes
Liberal	VALLANCE, John	5,607
Progressive	LE RUEZ, Alfred Luce	4,237
Conservative	HAGERMAN, James Arnold	3,106

1930 Canadian federal election
Party	Candidate	Votes
Liberal	VALLANCE, John	6,664
Conservative	ROUTLEDGE, James Anson	6,049
Farmer	CAMPBELL, Alexander Maxwell	3,439

== See also ==
- List of Canadian electoral districts
- Historical federal electoral districts of Canada
