= Hugh Horner =

Canadian politician (1925–1997)

- Official 1966 portrait

Member of the Canadian Parliament for Jasper—Edson
- In office 1958–1967
- Preceded by: Charles Yuill
- Succeeded by: Douglas Marmaduke Caston

1st Deputy Premier of Alberta
- In office September 10, 1971 – October 1, 1979
- Premier: Peter Lougheed
- Preceded by: Position Established
- Succeeded by: David John Russell

Personal details
- Born: February 1, 1925 Blaine Lake, Saskatchewan, Canada
- Died: March 27, 1997 (aged 72) Edmonton, Alberta, Canada
- Party: Progressive Conservative Party of Canada
- Relations: Jack Horner (Brother); Norval Horner (Brother); Albert Horner (Cousin)
- Children: Doug Horner
- Parent: Ralph Horner (Father)

Hugh Macarthur Horner (February 1, 1925 – March 27, 1997) was a physician and surgeon. He served as a Canadian federal and provincial politician. Horner was born in Blaine Lake, Saskatchewan. He was a Minister of the Crown in the province of Alberta and worked on agricultural projects after leaving politics.

== Federal politics ==
Horner first ran for a seat in the House of Commons of Canada in the 1958 federal election. He defeated incumbent Member of Parliament Charles Yuill to win his first term in office. Horner would run again in the 1962 federal election, and defeated Yuill once again to earn his second term in office. Parliament would be dissolved a year later after the minority government fell forcing the 1963 federal election. Horner ran for a third term and won in a landslide. Horner would run for his final term in federal office in the 1965 federal election. He won his district with another large majority. He would resign from his seat in 1967 to run for a seat in the provincial legislature.

== Provincial politics ==
Horner ran for a seat in the Legislative Assembly of Alberta in the Lac Ste. Anne electoral district. He defeated incumbent William Patterson in a closely contested race to win the district.

Horner's district was abolished in 1971, so he decided to run in the new Barrhead district. He won the new district in the 1971 Alberta general election by a comfortable margin. Horner was appointed to the cabinet after being elected in 1971. His first post was Minister of Agriculture. He served that portfolio from 1971 to 1975. He also served as Minister of Transportation and Minister of Economic Development as well as Deputy Premier.

He retained his seat for a third term in the 1975 Alberta general election increasing his margin of victory. Horner ran for a fourth term and won his largest provincial plurality in the 1979 Alberta general election. He resigned his post less than a year later on October 1, 1979.

== Late life ==
Horner was inducted into the Alberta Agriculture Hall of Fame in 1988 for his work in helping revive the Agriculture industry when he served as Minister of Agriculture in the province from 1971 to 1975. Hugh Horner died of a heart attack in Edmonton in 1997.

== Family ==
Horner's family has been very active on the Canadian political scene, his father Ralph Horner served as a Canadian Senator representing Saskatchewan from 1933 to 1964. Horner's two brothers both served in the House of Commons of Canada. His brother Jack Horner served as a Member of Parliament and Minister of the Crown in Alberta from 1958 to 1979. His other brother Norval Horner served as a Member of Parliament in Saskatchewan from 1972 to 1974.

His son, Doug Horner, followed his footsteps to become Alberta's minister of agriculture in 2004 and went on to become deputy premier in 2010.

Parliament of Canada
Preceded by Charles Yuill	Member of Parliament Jasper—Edson; 1958-1967	Succeeded by Douglas Marmaduke Caston
Legislative Assembly of Alberta
Preceded by William Patterson	MLA Lac Ste. Anne; 1967-1971	Succeeded by District Abolished
Preceded by New District	MLA Barrhead; 1971-1979	Succeeded by Ken Kowalski
