= Victor Quelch =

Canadian politician

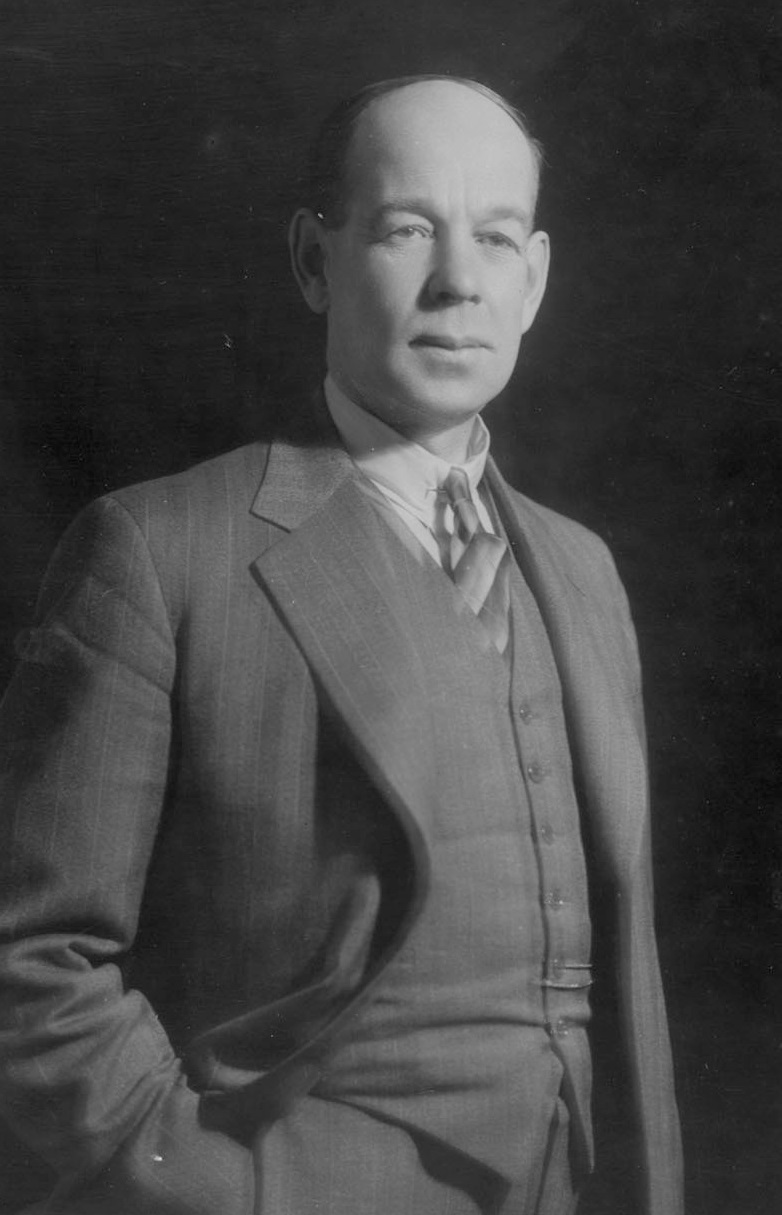

Member of Parliament for Acadia
- In office 14 October 1935 – 30 March 1958
- Preceded by: Robert Gardiner
- Succeeded by: Jack Horner

Personal details
- Born: 13 December 1891 Georgetown, British Guiana
- Died: 2 September 1975 (aged 83) Kamloops, British Columbia, Canada
- Party: Social Credit Party of Canada
- Profession: farmer

Victor Quelch (13 December 1891 – 2 September 1975) was a farmer, soldier in the Canadian Army, and long-serving Canadian federal politician.

== Military service ==
Born in Georgetown, British Guiana, Quelch was the son of British parents. He was educated at Fulneck School, West Yorkshire, before coming to Canada in 1909.

Quelch served in the Canadian Expeditionary Force in World War I from 1914 to 1918. During his distinguished military career, he achieved the rank of Captain and was awarded the prestigious Military Cross for bravery.

== Political career ==
Quelch first ran for public office in the 1935 Canadian federal election as a candidate from the Social Credit Party of Canada in the Acadia district in Alberta. In that election, he defeated incumbent Robert Gardiner and two other candidates in a landslide victory. Quelch stood for re-election for a second term in office in the 1940 Canadian federal election. In one of the closest contests in that election, he retained his seat by a margin of 27 votes, defeating Liberal candidate Arthur Day, whom he had previously faced in 1935.

Quelch was re-elected to his third term in the 1945 Canadian federal election by a much more comfortable margin, and was re-elected to a fourth term in the 1949 Canadian federal election. In 1950, Quelch was appointed by Liberal Prime Minister Louis St. Laurent to serve as one of six members from all parties as a Parliamentary adviser to the Canadian staff to the United Nations Assembly.

He was re-elected to his fifth term in office in the 1953 Canadian federal election. In that election, he once again faced and defeated Liberal candidate Arthur Day for the third time in another close election. Quelch would run for his final term in office in the 1957 Canadian federal election; he won in a landslide and retired from federal politics a year later when the government dissolved in 1958. Over his 23 years of service in the House of Commons of Canada, he served as critic for finance, agriculture, and fisheries.

Quelch died of pneumonia in September 1975 but, due to an oversight, no tribute was paid to him as was custom with deceased former members from the Canadian House of Commons. Twenty-four years later, Member of Parliament David Chatters paid tribute to the memory of Quelch during the Statements by Members period on 15 December 1999. Quelch's great-granddaughter was working for Chatters at the time and she wrote the tribute read by Chatters.
