= Acadia (federal electoral district) =

Former federal electoral district in Alberta, Canada

Alberta electoral district

Defunct federal electoral district
- Legislature: House of Commons
- District created: 1925
- District abolished: 1968
- First contested: 1925
- Last contested: 1965

Acadia was a federal electoral district in Alberta, Canada, that was represented in the House of Commons of Canada from 1925 to 1968.

== History ==
Acadia was created in 1924 from Battle River, Red Deer, Medicine Hat and Bow River ridings. It was abolished in 1966 when it was redistributed into Battle River, Crowfoot, Medicine Hat, Palliser and Red Deer ridings.

=== Members of Parliament ===
Acadia
Parliament	Years	Member	Party
District created from Battle River, Red Deer, Medicine Hat and Bow River
15th	1925–1926	Robert Gardiner	Progressive
16th	1926–1930	Robert Gardiner	United Farmers
17th	1930–1935	Robert Gardiner	United Farmers
18th	1935–1940	Victor Quelch	Social Credit
19th	1940–1945	Victor Quelch	Social Credit
20th	1945–1949	Victor Quelch	Social Credit
21st	1949–1953	Victor Quelch	Social Credit
22nd	1953–1957	Victor Quelch	Social Credit
23rd	1957–1958	Victor Quelch	Social Credit
24th	1958–1962	Jack Horner	Progressive Conservative
25th	1962–1963	Jack Horner	Progressive Conservative
26th	1963–1965	Jack Horner	Progressive Conservative
27th	1965–1968	Jack Horner	Progressive Conservative
District dissolved into Battle River, Crowfoot, Medicine Hat, Palliser and Red Deer

== Election results ==
=== 1965 ===
1965 Canadian federal election
Party	Candidate	Votes	%	±%
Progressive Conservative	Jack Horner	10,813	57.23	+5.37
Social Credit	Arthur Wiebe	5,384	28.50	–5.79
Liberal	Walter Peter Hourihan	1,786	9.45	–0.29
New Democratic	Art Bunney	911	4.82	+0.72
Total valid votes		18,894	99.55	
Total rejected ballots		85	0.45	+0.11
Turnout		18,979	78.65	–5.68
Eligible voters/turnout		24,130		
Progressive Conservative hold		Swing		–0.21
Source: Library of Parliament

=== 1963 ===
1963 Canadian federal election
Party	Candidate	Votes	%	±%
Progressive Conservative	Jack Horner	10,616	51.86	+8.97
Social Credit	G. Marshall Hewson	7,018	34.29	–4.16
Liberal	Walter Peter Hourihan	1,995	9.75	–1.18
New Democratic	Floyd Albin Johnson	840	4.10	–1.09
Total valid votes		20,469	99.66	
Total rejected ballots		70	0.34	–0.31
Turnout		20,539	84.33	+4.16
Eligible voters/turnout		24,356		
Progressive Conservative hold		Swing		+2.40
Source: Library of Parliament

=== 1962 ===
1962 Canadian federal election
Party	Candidate	Votes	%	±%
Progressive Conservative	Jack Horner	8,440	42.89	–7.46
Social Credit	G. Marshall Hewson	7,565	38.45	+9.30
Liberal	Walter Peter Hourihan	2,150	10.93	–4.67
New Democratic	Floyd Albin Johnson	1,021	5.19	+0.28
Independent Liberal	James A. Robinson	311	1.58	–
All Canadian	John Darby Naismith	189	0.96	–
Total valid votes		19,676	99.35	
Total rejected ballots		128	0.65	+0.21
Turnout		19,804	80.17	+2.90
Eligible voters/turnout		24,703		
Progressive Conservative hold		Swing		+0.92
Source: Library of Parliament

=== 1958 ===
1958 Canadian federal election
Party	Candidate	Votes	%	±%
Progressive Conservative	Jack Horner	9,669	50.35	+40.88
Social Credit	Meredith P. Bergman	5,597	29.15	–23.80
Liberal	Crawford Ferguson	2,995	15.60	–14.21
Co-operative Commonwealth	Ken Simpson Tory	942	4.91	–2.87
Total valid votes		19,203	99.56	
Total rejected ballots		84	0.44	+0.00
Turnout		19,287	77.27	–0.26
Eligible voters/turnout		24,961		
Progressive Conservative gain from Social Credit		Swing		+8.54
Source: Library of Parliament

=== 1957 ===
1957 Canadian federal election
Party	Candidate	Votes	%	±%
Social Credit	Victor Quelch	10,348	52.94	+7.00
Liberal	Crawford Ferguson	5,825	29.80	–13.53
Progressive Conservative	William R. Kent	1,852	9.48	–
Co-operative Commonwealth	Stuart McRae	1,520	7.78	–2.94
Total valid votes		19,545	99.57	
Total rejected ballots		85	0.43	–0.15
Turnout		19,630	77.53	+10.94
Eligible voters/turnout		25,319		
Social Credit hold		Swing		–3.27
Source: Library of Parliament

=== 1953 ===
1953 Canadian federal election
Party	Candidate	Votes	%	±%
Social Credit	Victor Quelch	7,956	45.95	–12.54
Liberal	Arthur Melville Day	7,503	43.33	+1.82
Co-operative Commonwealth	Stuart McRae	1,856	10.72	–
Total valid votes		17,315	99.41	
Total rejected ballots		102	0.59	+0.00
Turnout		17,417	66.59	–9.05
Eligible voters/turnout		26,157		
Social Credit hold		Swing		–5.36
Source: Library of Parliament

=== 1949 ===
1949 Canadian federal election
Party	Candidate	Votes	%	±%
Social Credit	Victor Quelch	5,897	58.48	+6.58
Liberal	Isber Frank Shacker	4,186	41.52	+22.51
Total valid votes		10,083	99.42	
Total rejected ballots		59	0.58	–0.35
Turnout		10,142	75.64	–2.94
Eligible voters/turnout		13,409		
Social Credit hold		Swing		+6.58
Source: Library of Parliament

=== 1945 ===
1945 Canadian federal election
Party	Candidate	Votes	%	±%
Social Credit	Victor Quelch	5,556	51.90	+6.56
Liberal	Lawrence Edgar Helmer	2,035	19.01	–26.00
Co-operative Commonwealth	John Kenneth Sutherland	1,903	17.78	+8.12
Progressive Conservative	John Albert Williams	1,211	11.31	–
Total valid votes		10,705	99.07	
Total rejected ballots		101	0.93	–0.03
Turnout		10,806	78.58	+22.55
Eligible voters/turnout		13,752		
Social Credit hold		Swing		–9.72
Source: Library of Parliament

=== 1940 ===
1940 Canadian federal election
Party	Candidate	Votes	%	±%
Social Credit	Victor Quelch	3,767	45.34	–13.43
Liberal	Arthur Melville Day	3,740	45.01	+31.25
Co-operative Commonwealth	George B. Smith	802	9.65	–8.06
Total valid votes		8,309	99.03	
Total rejected ballots		81	0.97	+0.01
Turnout		8,390	56.02	–9.76
Eligible voters/turnout		14,976		
Social Credit hold		Swing		+8.91
Source: Library of Parliament

=== 1935 ===
1935 Canadian federal election
Party	Candidate	Votes	%	±%
Social Credit	Victor Quelch	6,166	58.76	–
Co-operative Commonwealth	Robert Gardiner	1,859	17.72	–61.89
Liberal	Arthur Melville Day	1,444	13.76	–
Conservative	Cyril Augustin Coughlin	1,024	9.76	–10.63
Total valid votes		10,493	99.05	
Total rejected ballots		101	0.95	–
Turnout		10,594	65.78	–
Eligible voters/turnout		16,104		
Social Credit gain from United Farmers of Alberta		Swing		+38.24
Source: Library of Parliament

=== 1930 ===
1930 Canadian federal election
Party	Candidate	Votes	%	±%
United Farmers of Alberta	Robert Gardiner	acclaimed		
Total valid votes			–	
Eligible voters/turnout				
United Farmers of Alberta hold		Swing		–
Source: Library of Parliament

=== 1926 ===
1926 Canadian federal election
Party	Candidate	Votes	%	±%
United Farmers of Alberta	Robert Gardiner	7,041	79.61	+15.74
Conservative	George Harrison Wade	1,803	20.39	+2.75
Total valid votes		8,844	100.00	
Total rejected ballots		unknown		
Turnout		8,844	54.63	+1.94
Eligible voters/turnout		16,190		
United Farmers of Alberta gain from Progressive		Swing		+79.61
Source: Library of Parliament

=== 1925 ===
1925 Canadian federal election
Party	Candidate	Votes	%	
Progressive	Robert Gardiner	5,362	63.87	
Liberal	Robert Eaton	1,552	18.49	
Conservative	George Harrison Wade	1,481	17.64	
Total valid votes		8,395	100.00	
Total rejected ballots		unknown		
Turnout		8,395	52.69	
Eligible voters/turnout		15,934		
Progressive gain from		Swing		–
Source: Library of Parliament

== See also ==
- List of Canadian electoral districts
- Historical federal electoral districts of Canada
- Acadia (provincial electoral district) from 1913 to 1935
