= Albert Horner =

Canadian politician

- Official 1966 portrait

Member of the Canadian Parliament for The Battlefords
- In office March 31, 1958 – June 25, 1968
- Preceded by: Alexander Maxwell (Max) Campbell
- Succeeded by: District eliminated

Personal details
- Born: April 26, 1913 Shawville, Quebec, Canada
- Died: January 2, 2009 (aged 95) Blaine Lake, Saskatchewan, Canada
- Party: Progressive Conservative Party of Canada
- Relations: Ralph Horner (Uncle); Hugh Horner (Cousin); Jack Horner (Cousin); Doug Horner (Cousin); Norval Horner (Cousin)

Albert Ralph Horner (April 26, 1913 – January 2, 2009) was a Canadian politician, retired grain producer and livestock breeder in Saskatchewan. He was born in Shawville, Quebec. He served as a four-term Progressive Conservative MP under John Diefenbaker.

After coming in third in an unsuccessful attempt to win a seat in the House of Commons of Canada in the 1957 general election, Horner won election from The Battlefords, Saskatchewan in the 1958 general election that returned a massive majority for John Diefenbaker's Progressive Conservatives. Horner was easily re-elected in three subsequent elections and served as an MP for ten years at the 1968 general election to return to private life. Horner returned to political activity almost 35 years later when he voiced his opposition to the 2003 creation of the Conservative Party of Canada through a merger of the Progressive Conservative Party and the Canadian Alliance and added his name to an unsuccessful court action to block the dissolution of the Progressive Conservatives.

In April 2007, Horner and David Orchard co-wrote an op-ed piece opposing the Stephen Harper government's proposal to weaken or dissolve the Canadian Wheat Board. Albert Horner was the cousin of fellow MPs Jack Horner, Hugh Horner and Norval Horner and the nephew of Senator Ralph Horner. Horner lived in Blaine Lake, Saskatchewan until his death.

== See also ==
- Politicians in Saskatchewan
- Politics of Saskatchewan
