= Jack Horner (politician) =

Canadian politician (1927–2004)

The Honourable Jack Horner PC
- Official 1974 portrait

Member of the Canadian Parliament for Acadia
- In office March 31, 1958 – June 24, 1968
- Preceded by: Victor Quelch
- Succeeded by: District was abolished in 1966

Member of the Canadian Parliament for Crowfoot
- In office June 25, 1968 – May 22, 1979
- Preceded by: District was created in 1966
- Succeeded by: Arnold Malone

Minister of Industry, Trade and Commerce
- In office September 16, 1977 – June 3, 1979
- Prime Minister: Pierre Trudeau
- Preceded by: Jean Chrétien
- Succeeded by: Robert de Cotret

Minister Without Portfolio
- In office April 21, 1977 – September 16, 1977
- Prime Minister: Pierre Trudeau

Personal details
- Born: John Henry Horner; July 20, 1927 Blaine Lake, Saskatchewan, Canada
- Died: November 18, 2004 (aged 77) Calgary, Alberta, Canada
- Party: Liberal (1977-2004)
- Other political affiliations: Progressive Conservative (1958-1977)
- Spouse: Leola Horner
- Relations: Hugh Horner (Brother); Norval Horner (Brother); Albert Horner (Cousin)
- Children: Brent Horner; Craig Horner
- Parent: Ralph Horner
- Profession: Farmer, Rancher

John Henry "Jack" Horner PC (July 20, 1927 – November 18, 2004) was a Canadian rancher, politician, and Cabinet minister.

== Life and career ==
Nicknamed "Cactus Jack", Horner was born in Saskatchewan, the fifth child in a family of six boys and three girls. His mother's uncle had been a prisoner of Louis Riel's provisional government. His father, Ralph Horner, was a failed Conservative candidate who was appointed to the board of directors of Canadian National Railways by the government of R. B. Bennett in 1931, and then to the Senate of Canada in 1933.

Jack Horner moved to Alberta at the age of 18 to manage a ranch purchased by his father and then bought his own ranch in 1947.

He was first elected to the House of Commons of Canada in the 1958 federal election from the rural central Alberta riding of Acadia as a member of the Progressive Conservative Party, defeating a 23-year Social Credit incumbent. Horner was part of the largest majority government in Canadian history and his party won the second-largest percentage of the popular vote. Also elected to the Parliament of Canada as Tories were his older brother, Hugh Horner and cousin Albert Horner. With Jack Horner's father, Ralph, still sitting as a Senator, four Horners were sitting in the two chambers of Parliament simultaneously. Another brother, Norval Horner, was elected to the House in 1972. When Acadia was abolished in 1968, the bulk of it was absorbed into the new riding of Crowfoot, and Horner ran in this riding and won.

According to Jack Horner's obituary in The Globe and Mail newspaper:

He presented himself as a friend of farmers, a foe of railways, an advocate of capital punishment, a critic of generous unemployment payments, an opponent of the right to strike in essential services, and at all times a staunch free enterpriser. He railed against any changes to the Crow's Nest Pass rate that might hurt farmers. He was alert to any threat of socialism, whether from the Co-operative Commonwealth Federation, Opposition Liberals, or the Red Tories in his own party.

Horner developed a reputation as a right winger and outspoken advocate for the rights of farmers and ranchers. He was an avid supporter of Prime Minister John Diefenbaker, and remained one of "Diefenbaker's cowboys" during the 1960s, backing Diefenbaker against multiple attempts to unseat him. At the 1966 Tory convention, which changed the rules to allow a challenge to a sitting leader (and ultimately paved the way for Diefenbaker's ouster), Horner threw a punch at Dalton Camp supporter Roy McMurtry, and accosted Brian Mulroney in a hallway. He resented the leadership of Diefenbaker's successor, Robert Stanfield, describing him as "a very, very sad choice". Horner worked to undermine Stanfield's leadership by leading a revolt against the party's support for the Official Languages Act.

He was a candidate for the PC Party leadership at the 1976 convention. At one point during the convention, he knocked over an eavesdropping reporter. He finished fourth in the contest, and threw his support to Claude Wagner, who lost on the final ballot to Joe Clark.

Although Clark was a fellow Albertan from a rural riding, Horner expressed even less respect for him than he had for Stanfield. Horner regarded Clark as a city slicker. Horner once paid Clark the ultimate rancher's insult by describing him as a "sheep herder."

On April 20, 1977, Horner shocked his constituents and many political observers by crossing the floor to join the Liberal Party, which was at the time deeply unpopular in Alberta. The next day, he joined Pierre Trudeau's cabinet as minister without portfolio, and was promoted in September 1977 to the position of Minister of Industry, Trade and Commerce. When Diefenbaker, who was still in Parliament 14 years after leaving the prime ministership, learned of Horner's defection, he said, "the sheriff has joined the rustlers."

Despite (or perhaps due to) his cabinet position, Horner's floor-crossing was unpopular in his strongly conservative riding. Even by rural Alberta standards, Crowfoot was an unshakably conservative area. Most of its living residents had never been represented by a Liberal, and the bulk of its territory had been represented since 1935 by centre-right MPs - either Social Credit or Conservative. He was not helped by the redistribution ahead of the 1979 federal election, which pushed him into a riding that was almost two-thirds new to him. Although it retained the name of Crowfoot, most of its constituents came from neighbouring Battle River, represented by Tory Arnold Malone.

Many critics argued that Horner's floor crossing was motivated by opportunism as opposed to ideology and ultimately provoked by the pending electoral redistribution. Had Horner remained with the Tories, the redistribution meant he would have had to face Malone for the PC nomination. Horner would have faced difficulties trying to gain the PC nomination in the redistributed Crowfoot. It was more Malone's riding than Horner's, and Malone was also favoured by Clark and the PC establishment. That left Horner with only three options: run as an independent, cross the floor, or retire from federal politics. His chances of retaining his seat as an independent were slim, though slightly better than his chances of being elected as a Liberal given the strong antipathy toward the Liberals in rural Alberta. On the other hand, serving as a government member from Alberta virtually guaranteed Horner a cabinet post for the remainder of the 30th Parliament, since the Liberals had not elected any members under their own banner from Alberta in the 1974 election and were not likely to in 1979. Serving as a Liberal also gave Horner the prospect of securing patronage appointments under future Liberal governments after leaving Parliament, a prospect that Horner considered quite likely because of his low opinion of Clark's leadership.

In any event, Horner ran for reelection as a Liberal even though polling indicated he would almost certainly be defeated. One poll showed him getting only 15 percent of the vote, down from 75 percent in 1974 when he ran as a Conservative. As expected, Horner was badly defeated in the 1979 election, which unseated the Liberal government. His vote share collapsed to 18 percent, losing almost three fourths of his vote from 1974. Ultimately, he finished a very distant second, more than 20,000 votes behind Malone. Clark's minority government lasted less than a year, and Horner attempted a comeback in the 1980 federal election, again as a Liberal. Despite the return of a Liberal government nationally, Horner again placed a poor second in Crowfoot, winning only 4,761 votes, 1,000 votes fewer than he had managed in 1979.

The Liberal government appointed him to the board of Canadian National Railways, where he served as chairman from 1982 to 1984. From 1984 to 1988, he was Administrator (Federal Deputy Minister equivalent) of the Western Grain Transportation Agency, reporting to Parliament through the Minister of Transport.

He died at a Calgary hospital, leaving his wife, Leola, and two sons, Brent and Craig.

Parliament of Canada
Preceded by Victor Quelch	Member of Parliament Acadia; 1958–1968	Succeeded by District Abolished
Preceded by New District	Member of Parliament Crowfoot; 1968–1979	Succeeded by Arnold Malone
20th Canadian Ministry (1968–1979) – First cabinet of Pierre Trudeau
Cabinet post (1)
Predecessor	Office	Successor
Jean Chrétien	Minister of Industry, Trade and Commerce; 1977–1979	Robert de Cotret
