= Ralph Horner =

Canadian politician (1884–1964)

The Honourable Ralph Horner
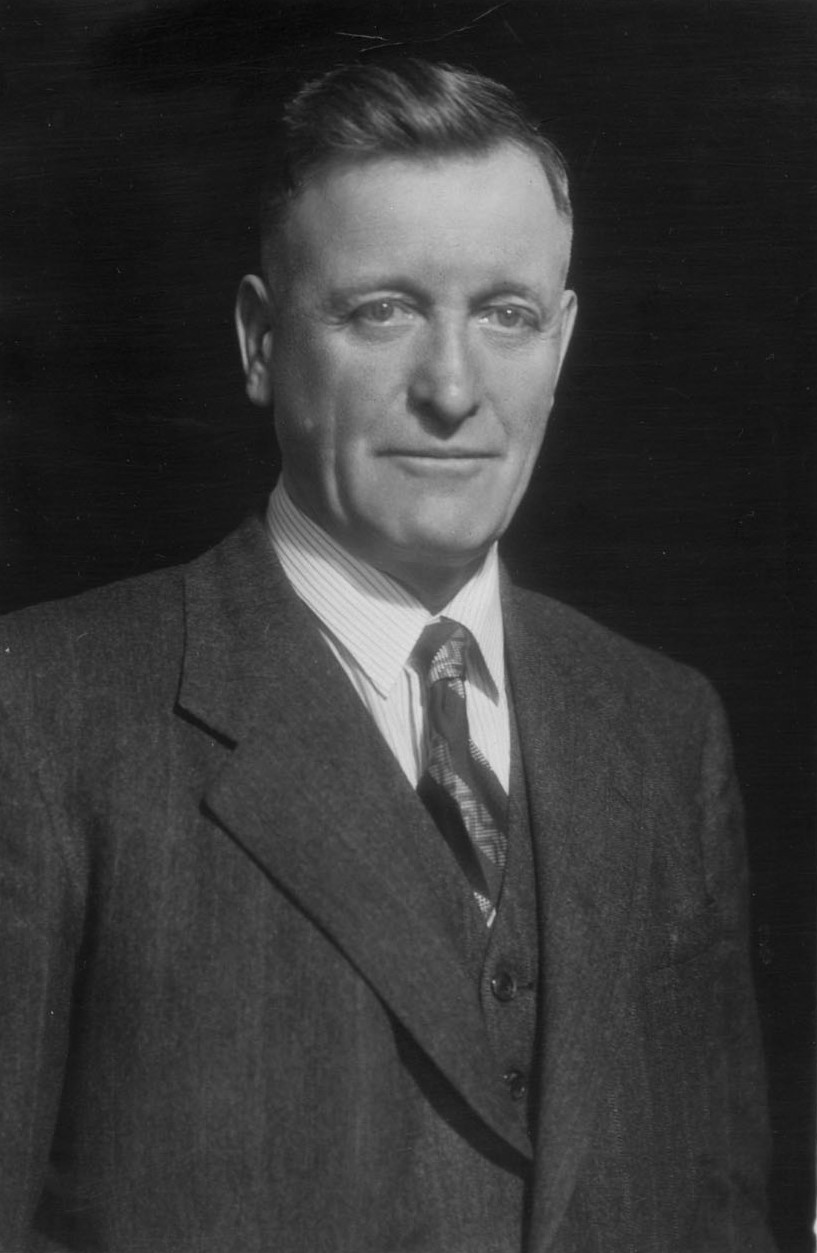

Canadian Senator from Saskatchewan
- In office December 30, 1933 – December 14, 1964
- Appointed by: R. B. Bennett

Personal details
- Born: Ralph Byron Horner; June 26, 1884 North Claredon, Quebec, Canada
- Died: December 14, 1964 (aged 80)
- Party: Conservative
- Children: Hugh Horner; Norval Horner; Jack Horner

Ralph Byron Horner (June 26, 1884 – December 14, 1964) was a Canadian politician, farmer, businessman and the patriarch of a Western Canadian political family.

== Background ==
Born in North Clarendon, Quebec, Horner and his family settled in Blaine Lake, Saskatchewan.

A Conservative activist and twice failed provincial candidate, Horner was appointed to the board of the Canadian National Railway by the government of R.B. Bennett in 1931. In 1933, Bennett appointed Horner to the Senate where he served for over 30 years until his death in 1964 as the Senator for Saskatchewan North.

In the 1958 general election, two of his sons, Jack Horner and Hugh Horner and his nephew Albert Horner were all elected to the House of Commons of Canada as Progressive Conservatives. Four Horners thus sat in Parliament simultaneously (though in different chambers) until Ralph Horner's death in 1964. (In 1972 a third son, Norval Horner, was elected).
