= Allan MacEachen =

Canadian politician

The Honourable Allan MacEachen PC OC
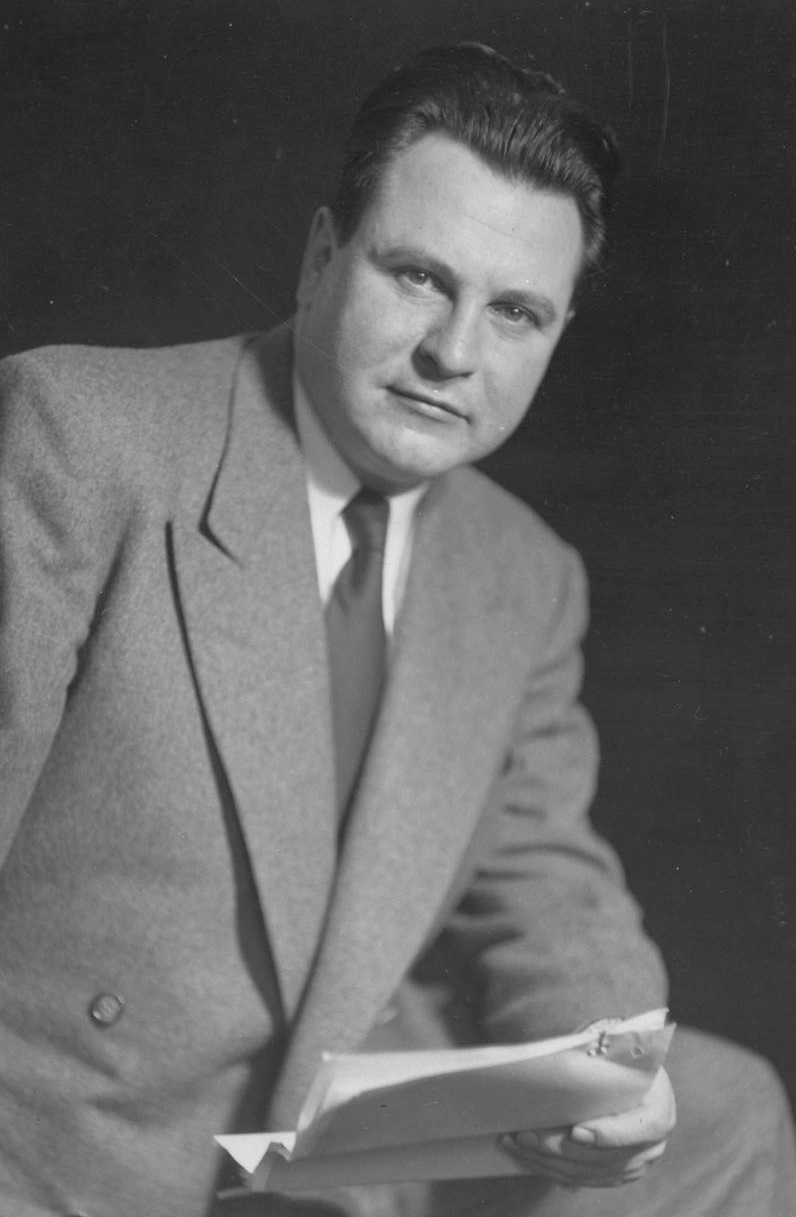
- MacEachen shortly after first being elected to the House of Commons

1st Deputy Prime Minister of Canada
- In office March 3, 1980 – June 29, 1984
- Prime Minister: Pierre Trudeau
- Preceded by: Himself (1979)
- Succeeded by: Jean Chrétien
- In office September 16, 1977 – June 4, 1979
- Prime Minister: Pierre Trudeau
- Preceded by: Position established
- Succeeded by: Himself (1980)
Ministerial offices
Secretary of State for External Affairs
In office September 10, 1982 – June 29, 1984
Prime Minister	Pierre Trudeau
Preceded by	Mark MacGuigan
Succeeded by	Jean Chrétien
In office August 8, 1974 – September 13, 1976
Prime Minister	Pierre Trudeau
Preceded by	Mitchell Sharp
Succeeded by	Donald Jamieson
Minister of Finance
In office March 3, 1980 – September 9, 1982
Prime Minister	Pierre Trudeau
Preceded by	John Crosbie
Succeeded by	Marc Lalonde
President of the Privy Council
In office September 15, 1976 – June 3, 1979
Prime Minister	Pierre Trudeau
Preceded by	Mitchell Sharp
Succeeded by	Walter Baker
In office September 24, 1970 – August 7, 1974
Prime Minister	Pierre Trudeau
Preceded by	Donald Stovel Macdonald
Succeeded by	Mitchell Sharp
Acting; May 2, 1968 – July 5, 1968
Prime Minister	Pierre Trudeau
Preceded by	Pierre Trudeau (Acting)
Succeeded by	Donald Stovel Macdonald
Leader of the Government in the House of Commons
In office September 14, 1976 – March 26, 1979
Prime Minister	Pierre Trudeau
Preceded by	Mitchell Sharp
Succeeded by	Walter Baker
In office September 24, 1970 – May 9, 1974
Prime Minister	Pierre Trudeau
Preceded by	Donald Stovel Macdonald
Succeeded by	Mitchell Sharp
In office May 4, 1967 – April 23, 1968
Prime Minister	Lester B. Pearson
Preceded by	George McIlraith
Succeeded by	Donald Stovel Macdonald
Minister of Manpower and Immigration
In office July 6, 1968 – September 23, 1970
Prime Minister	Pierre Trudeau
Preceded by	Jean Marchand
Succeeded by	Otto Lang
Minister of National Health and Welfare
In office December 18, 1965 – July 5, 1968
Prime Minister	Lester B. Pearson; Pierre Trudeau
Preceded by	Judy LaMarsh
Succeeded by	John C. Munro
Minister of Amateur Sport
In office December 18, 1965 – July 5, 1968
Prime Minister	Lester B. Pearson; Pierre Trudeau
Preceded by	Judy LaMarsh
Succeeded by	John C. Munro
Minister of Labour
In office April 22, 1963 – December 18, 1965
Prime Minister	Lester B. Pearson
Preceded by	Michael Starr
Succeeded by	John Robert Nicholson
Parliamentary offices
Senator for Highlands-Canso, Nova Scotia
In office June 29, 1984 – July 6, 1996
Appointed by	John Turner
Member of Parliament for Cape Breton Highlands—Canso (Inverness—Richmond; 1953–1968)
In office June 18, 1962 – June 28, 1984
Preceded by	Robert MacLellan
Succeeded by	Lawrence O'Neil
In office August 10, 1953 – March 30, 1958
Preceded by	William F. Carroll
Succeeded by	Robert MacLellan

Personal details
- Born: Allan Joseph MacEachen; July 6, 1921 Inverness, Nova Scotia, Canada
- Died: September 12, 2017 (aged 96) Antigonish, Nova Scotia, Canada
- Party: Liberal
- Education: St. Francis Xavier University; University of Toronto; University of Chicago; Massachusetts Institute of Technology
- Profession: Politician; Economist; Professor

Allan Joseph MacEachen PC OC (/məˈkɛkən/; July 6, 1921 – September 12, 2017) was a Canadian politician and statesman who served as a senator and several times as a Cabinet minister. He was the first deputy prime minister of Canada and served from 1977 to 1979 and 1980 to 1984.

== Early life ==
Born in Inverness on Nova Scotia's Cape Breton Island, MacEachen graduated from St. Francis Xavier University, and lectured in economics for several years at the school. He was the son of Annie Gillies and Angus MacEachen, a coal miner from Inverness County, Nova Scotia. MacEachen's maternal grandfather immigrated to Cape Breton Island from Morar, Scotland, in 1865. MacEachen's parents both spoke the distinctive Nova Scotia dialect of Scottish Gaelic at home and MacEachen himself was a fluent speaker.

== Political career ==
=== Early political career ===
MacEachen was elected for the first time to the House of Commons of Canada in the 1953 election as a Liberal under the leadership of Prime Minister Louis St-Laurent. MacEachen was re-elected in the 1957 election but was defeated in the Progressive Conservative Diefenbaker sweep in the 1958 election, the largest federal electoral victory in Canadian history.

MacEachen was re-elected to Parliament in the 1962 general election and again in the 1963, 1965, 1968, 1972, 1974, 1979, and 1980 elections.

=== Cabinet minister ===
When Lester B. Pearson formed a Liberal government in 1963, he appointed MacEachen to cabinet as Minister of Labour. It was the beginning of a lengthy career in cabinet in which MacEachen served in several portfolios under Prime Ministers Pearson, Pierre Trudeau and John Turner. Over the course of his career, MacEachen held the following portfolios: Labour, National Health and Welfare, Manpower and Immigration, Privy Council, External Affairs, and Finance.

In addition to his ministerial responsibilities, MacEachen served as Government House Leader on three occasions and became the first Deputy Prime Minister of Canada in 1977 under Trudeau, a post that was held whenever Trudeau was in office until the latter retired.

In his memoirs, published in 1993, Trudeau wrote that MacEachen "had a very good strategic sense, both in and out of Parliament, and he lived and breathed politics." For Trudeau, he "was always a source of shrewd advice" and "was the kind of man I respected, because he had no ulterior motives; he said what he thought, and the reasons he would give were always his real reasons."

In 1968 MacEachen contested the leadership of the Liberal Party but did not do well, largely because there was a second Nova Scotian on the ballot. He was courted to run for leader again in 1984 but opted to support John Turner, the eventual winner.

In 1979, when the Liberals lost the election to Joe Clark's Conservatives, MacEachen served as interim Leader of the Opposition when Trudeau announced his retirement from politics. Trudeau's short-lived retirement ended with the defeat of Clark's government in a vote of confidence of his budget and the Liberals' return to power with a majority government on February 18, 1980.

MacEachen took the role of Finance Minister and announced the National Energy Policy as part of his 1980 budget. He also angered public sector unions in his 1982 budget by imposing a wage restraint package dubbed "six and five," which limited wage increases to 6% and 5% for the next two years. That was while double-digit interest rates and inflation were common.

=== Senator ===
Turner, the new party leader and prime minister, recommended MacEachen for appointment to the Senate, where MacEachen became Leader of the Government in the Senate. MacEachen was in that position only briefly, as Turner lost the 1984 election, but MacEachen started the practice of allowing opposition senators to chair a number of committees, a practice that continues today.

From 1984 to 1991, he served as leader of the opposition in the Senate, where he was regarded as the primary opposition to the Conservative Brian Mulroney's first term because of Mulroney's substantial majority in the Commons, with an opposition that was spread nearly equally between Turner's Liberals and Ed Broadbent's New Democratic Party. In 1988, after a request by Turner, MacEachen blocked the Canada-U.S. Free Trade Agreement in the Senate to force an election before the issue was settled. The agreement was the main issue of the 1988 election. After Mulroney's victory, MacEachen and the Senate passed the agreement.

After the election, MacEachen again used the Senate to block the introduction of the Goods and Services Tax. Mulroney recommended for appointment several new senators and used an emergency power in the Constitution Act, 1867, to allow him to recommend for appointment eight new senators. MacEachen then led a filibuster against the bill, with Liberal members defying Speaker Guy Charbonneau, who voted for Conservative motions. The Liberal senators used other tactics to delay Senate business. Soon, the motion was passed, and the Progressive Conservative majority passed new rules for the Senate to forbid such actions.

MacEachen retired from the Senate in 1996 after he had reached the mandatory retirement age of 75, and he became a dollar-per-year adviser to the Department of Foreign Affairs and International Trade. Further controversy ensued in 1998, when it was discovered that he was still using a full Senate office.

== Retirement and death ==
After leaving the Senate, MacEachen retired to Nova Scotia spending the rest of his life at his house on Lake Ainslie in Inverness County, Cape Breton and in Antigonish. In 2006, MacEachen endorsed Bob Rae's candidacy to lead the Liberal Party, and was appointed honorary campaign chair of Rae's campaign.

MacEachen died at the age of 96 on September 12, 2017, at St. Martha's Hospital in Antigonish, Nova Scotia.

== Honours ==
In 2008, he was made an Officer of the Order of Canada.

St. Francis Xavier University holds the annual Allan J. MacEachen lecture in his honour. In 2000, the Allan J. MacEachen International Academic and Cultural Centre was opened in Mabou, Nova Scotia. The complex consists of a secondary school, Dalbrae Academy, and Strathspey Place, a performing arts centre. Dalhousie University's MacEachen Institute for Public Policy and Governance is also named after him.

In 2021, Beaton Street, which is where MacEachen was raised in Inverness, Nova Scotia, was renamed Allan J. Memorial Avenue. The renaming coincided with the hundredth anniversary of MacEachen's birth, and was widely celebrated by many in the small Cape Breton community. Project chair Ben MacKay remarked at the unveiling ceremony that “There is no better example to leave behind for my generation, and all future generations of young people in this country.”

23rd Canadian Ministry (1984) – Cabinet of John Turner
Cabinet post (1)
Predecessor	Office	Successor
Bud Olson	Leader of the Government in the Senate; June 30, 1984 – September 17, 1984	Duff Roblin
22nd Canadian Ministry (1980–1984) – Second cabinet of Pierre Trudeau
Cabinet posts (3)
Predecessor	Office	Successor
Mark MacGuigan	Secretary of State for External Affairs; September 10, 1982 – June 30, 1984	Jean Chrétien
John Crosbie	Minister of Finance; March 3, 1980 – September 9, 1982	Marc Lalonde
himself, then vacant	Deputy Prime Minister of Canada; March 3, 1980 – June 30, 1984	Jean Chrétien
20th Canadian Ministry (1968–1979) – First cabinet of Pierre Trudeau
Cabinet posts (8)
Predecessor	Office	Successor
position created / previous Senior Minister Paul Hellyer	Deputy Prime Minister of Canada; September 16, 1977 – June 4, 1979	vacant, then himself
Mitchell Sharp	President of the Queen's Privy Council for Canada; September 14, 1976 – June 4, 1979	Walter David Baker
Mitchell Sharp	Secretary of State for External Affairs; August 8, 1974 – September 13, 1976	Donald Jamieson
Donald Stovel Macdonald	President of the Queen's Privy Council for Canada; September 24, 1970 – August 7, 1974	Mitchell Sharp
Jean Marchand	Minister of Manpower and Immigration; July 6, 1968 – September 23, 1970	Otto Lang
Pierre Trudeau	President of the Queen's Privy Council for Canada (acting); May 2, 1968 – 5 July 1968	Donald Stovel Macdonald
cont'd from 19th Min.	Minister of Amateur Sport; April 20, 1968 – July 5, 1968	
cont'd from 19th Min.	Minister of National Health and Welfare; April 20, 1968 – July 5, 1968	John Munro
Special Parliamentary Responsibilities
Predecessor	Title	Successor
Mitchell Sharp	Leader of the Government in the House of Commons; September 14, 1976 – March 26, 1979	Walter David Baker
Donald Stovel Macdonald	Leader of the Government in the House of Commons; September 24, 1970 – May 9, 1974	Mitchell Sharp
19th Canadian Ministry (1963–1968) – Cabinet of Lester B. Pearson
Cabinet posts (3)
Predecessor	Office	Successor
Judy LaMarsh	Minister of National Health and Welfare; 18 December 1965 – 20 April 1968	cont'd into 20th Min.
	Minister of Amateur Sport; 18 December 1965 – 20 April 1968	cont'd into 20th Min.
Michael Starr	Minister of Labour; 22 April 1963 – 17 December 1965	John Robert Nicholson
Special Parliamentary Responsibilities
Predecessor	Title	Successor
George James McIlraith	Leader of the Government in the House of Commons; May 4, 1967 – April 20, 1968	Donald Stovel Macdonald
Party political offices
Preceded by position created	Deputy Leader of the Liberal Party of Canada; 1977–1984	Succeeded by Jean Chrétien
Parliament of Canada
Preceded by William F. Carroll	Member of Parliament for Inverness—Richmond; 1953–1958	Succeeded by Robert MacLellan
Preceded by Robert MacLellan	Member of Parliament for Inverness—Richmond; 1962–1968	Succeeded by riding abolished
Preceded by riding created	Member of Parliament for Cape Breton Highlands—Canso; 1968–1984	Succeeded by Lawrence O'Neil
Government offices
Preceded by Jacques Flynn	Leader of the Opposition in the Senate of Canada; September 16, 1984 – November 30, 1991	Succeeded by Royce Herbert Frith
