= Lawrence O'Neil =

Canadian politician

Member of the Canadian Parliament for Cape Breton Highlands—Canso
- In office 4 September 1984 – 21 November 1988
- Preceded by: Allan MacEachen
- Succeeded by: Francis LeBlanc

Personal details
- Born: 14 November 1954 (age 72)
- Party: Progressive Conservative
- Profession: Lawyer, judge, politician

Lawrence I. O'Neil (born 14 November 1954) is a Justice of the Nova Scotia Supreme Court, Family Division. He was a lawyer by profession. Between 1984 and 1988, he was a Progressive Conservative party member of the House of Commons of Canada.

== Early life and education ==
O'Neil graduated from St. Francis Xavier University in 1976 where he earned a Bachelor of Arts degree. He was admitted to the Nova Scotia Bar in 1979 after earning a Bachelor of Laws degree from Dalhousie University.

He then practiced with Pickup & MacDowell and as a sole practitioner. He then became a staff lawyer with Nova Scotia Legal Aid in Antigonish until the time of his appointment.

== Political career ==
He was elected at Cape Breton Highlands—Canso electoral district in the 1984 federal election, thus he served in the 33rd Canadian Parliament. O'Neil was defeated in the 1988 federal election by Francis LeBlanc of the Liberal Party.

== Judicial career ==
O'Neil was appointed to the Supreme Court of Nova Scotia on 19 September 2007 by Justice Minister Honourable Robert Nicholson. The swearing in ceremony took place on 23 October 2007 in St. Ninian's Place on the Campus of St. Francis Xavier University in Antigonish, Nova Scotia.

=== Controversy ===
The appointment was controversial due to past statements while an MP regarding abortion. In 1985, O'Neil moved to introduce a bill to amend the Criminal Code to require that every unborn child be represented by legal counsel at therapeutic abortion committees across the country. On 28 April 1987, he told the House of Commons that "unborn children across this country are being suctioned from the womb by women who want to put an end to their pregnancy. Those children are being dismembered." On 27 July 1988, he stated in the House of Commons that "[i]t appears that there is widespread acceptance of the notion that a mother should have the right to control her body. There is no such right."

=== 2017 Decision Overturned ===
O'Neil delayed an adoption hearing because of entirely hypothetical constitutional concerns about whether the child's biological father had been given proper notice. In a unanimous decision, the Nova Scotia Appeal Court noted that the adoptive parents of a young baby found themselves caught in a "judge-made vortex of uncertainty and delay" that stalled the adoption for almost a year at great expense and anxiety to the family.

The Nova Scotia Appeal Court found that O'Neil erred in legal principle when he initiated a self-directed constitutional reference, which the court termed both inappropriate and ill-conceived. The Appeal Court stated that O'Neil was "provided with the correct legal principles and authorities which ought to have informed his decision.... he ignored these and the practical consequences of his decision."
