= Robert MacLellan =

Robert MacLellan or Maclellan may refer to:

- Robert MacLellan (politician, born 1925) (1925–2011), member of the House of Commons of Canada
- Robert A. MacLellan (1882–1968), Canadian politician in the Nova Scotia House of Assembly
- Robert Maclellan, 1st Lord Kirkcudbright (died 1641), provost of Kirkcudbright known for his riotous (and violent) behavior
- Rob Maclellan (born 1934), Australian politician
