= December 17–20, 2025 North American storm complex =

Weather event in the United States and Canada

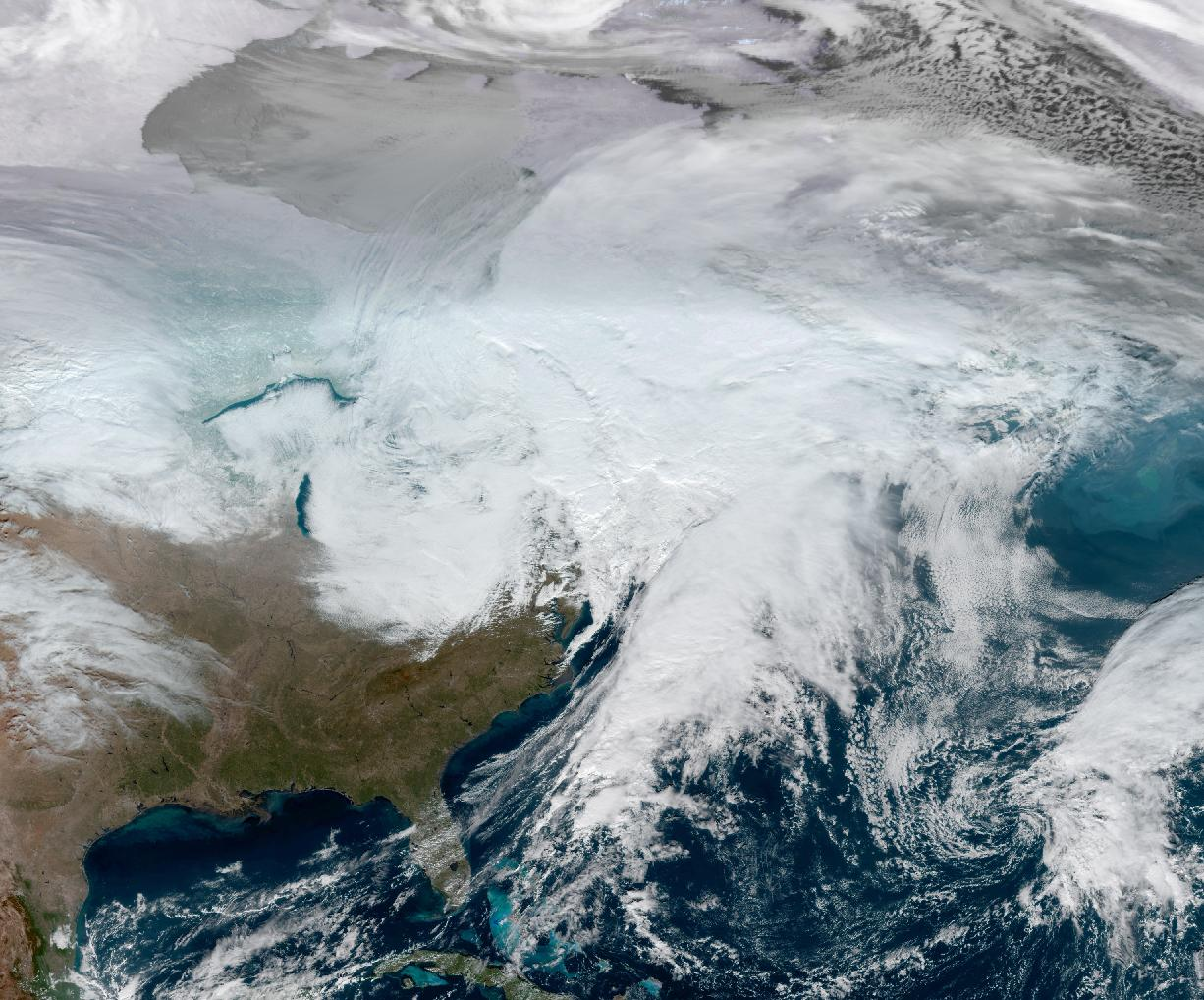
- Satellite image of the storm complex over the Eastern United States on December 19

Meteorological history
- Formed: December 16, 2025
- Exited land: December 20, 2025
- Dissipated: December 21, 2025

Winter storm
- Highest gusts: 144 mph (232 km/h) in Smoot, Wyoming
- Lowest pressure: 945 mbar (hPa); 27.91 inHg
- Max. snowfall: Snowfall – 12 in (30 cm) near Dupuyer, Montana

Overall effects
- Fatalities: 3
- Injuries: 2
- Damage: >$735 million
- Areas affected: Western United States, Central Plains, Southwestern United States, Texas, Western and Eastern Canada
- Power outages: 1,185,000
- Part of the 2025–26 North American winter

From December 17 to December 20, 2025, a historic and multifaceted weather event impacted the Western and Central United States with winter storm impacts, hurricane-force wind gusts, record-breaking winter temperatures, and a "Particularly Dangerous Situation" (PDS) for wildfire risk in Colorado and Kansas. The storm affected Montana, Washington, Idaho, Wyoming, New Mexico, Oklahoma, and Texas as well. 16 states were affected by the storm in total.

The event was driven by an intense mid-latitude cyclone that underwent rapid cyclogenesis as it moved over the Rocky Mountains. A powerful jet stream, with core speeds exceeding 170 miles per hour (270 km/h), helped create a massive pressure gradient across the Central Plains. As the system moved east, it drew an exceptionally warm and dry air mass from the Desert Southwest, resulting in "downslope" or adiabatic heating. This phenomenon, combined with a lack of snow cover in the High Plains, allowed surface temperatures to climb to levels more typical of May or September. By December 19, the atmospheric setup created a rare "perfect storm" of extreme fire weather and damaging non-thunderstorm winds.

The storm resulted in three deaths across Canada and the United States. Damages totaled to $735 million in the United States according to Gallagher Re.

== Meteorological history ==
A storm developed while atmospheric river made landfall along the United States Pacific Northwest coastline on December 17. The storm moved into British Columbia by 09:00 UTC. It became an Alberta clipper as it moved over Alberta. Early on December 18, it had crossed the 49th parallel and moved into the northern Midwestern United States. It travelled over the Midwest and then into Lake Superior and into Ontario early on December 19. The system would then track over Quebec and Labrador before moving offshore at 12:00 UTC on December 20. As it moved over the Labrador Sea, it deepened to a pressure of 945 mb (27.9 inHg) at 21:00 UTC.

== Impacts ==
=== Canada ===
Over 120,000 customers were without power in the morning of December 17 in British Columbia. A special weather statement was in effect for southern British Columbia. Schools were closed in many areas. A falling tree crushed a woman in Chilliwack on December 15.

In Alberta, hazardous driving conditions due to whiteout conditions contributed to 80–100 vehicles to pileup on Highway 2 between Airdrie and Calgary.

Winds of up to 128 km/h (80 mph) occurred in Eastend, Saskatchewan. A fatality occurred when three semi-trucks collided on the Trans-Canada Highway on December 17. Between 4 P.M. CST and 7 A.M. on December 18, the Royal Canadian Mounted Police saw 82 crash reports. 25 other weather-related reports also occurred at the same time. A semi-truck 130 km (81 mi) caught fire after going off the road. Saskatoon saw 11 cm (4.3 in) of snow and declared a snow event. Rosetown saw 25 cm (9.8 in) of snow with drifts approaching 85 cm (33 in).

In Manitoba, Winnipeg saw all highways closed on December 18. Three universities in Winnipeg postponed exams. The province saw power outages on the morning of December 18.

Ontario saw snow and rain. Thunder Bay initially saw rain and drizzle on the morning of December 18 before transitioning to snow that afternoon. Schools were closed across the region. Several highways were closed after a collision on Highway 11.

Much of Quebec was under wind, heavy rain, and flash freeze warnings. Over 87,400 customers across the province on December 19 lost power. Winds of up to 90 km/h (56 mph) occurred in Montreal.

Newfoundland and Labrador saw strong winds. An orange winter storm warning was in effect for Nain. Power outages occurred in Newfoundland and Labrador. The Wreckhouse area saw winds of up to 138 km/h (86 mph). Ferry crossings were cancelled. Blowing snow on the western coastline of Newfoundland as well as sea-effect snow across the region occurred on December 20.

New Brunswick and Prince Edward Island saw strong winds and power outages. Wind and rainfall warnings were in effect for parts of New Brunswick. Power outages began on December 19, with 35,723 in New Brunswick and 71 on Prince Edward Island by 8:30 P.M. The Petitcodiac Regional School closed due to an outage at 1 P.M. Crossings between New Brunswick and Prince Edward Island were suspended on the Confederation Bridge. A gust of 132 km/h (82 mph) reported on the bridge. The bridge was reopened with restrictions before midnight but closed again on the morning of December 20. Almost 57,000 were without power by 8 A.M. in New Brunswick on December 20. In total during the storm, around 90,000 lost power in New Brunswick. Prince Edward Island saw up to 1,600 customers losing power. The strongest observed gust in New Brunswick was 135 km/h (84 mph) in Grand Manan.

Strong winds led to power outages as well as disruptions in Nova Scotia. The Emergency Coordination Centre in the Halifax Regional Municipality was activated at 8 P.M. on December 19. Many ferries were cancelled and some flights were delayed or cancelled at Stanfield International Airport. The Big Tancook Elementary School was closed early morning while the Cape Breton Highlands Education Centre/Academy saw an early dismissal due to strong winds. By the morning of December 20, almost 200,000 customers lost power. Nova Scotia Power opened its emergency operation centre. The province saw winds of 110 km/h (68 mph), with Cape Breton recording winds of over 120 km/h (75 mph). Monastery had the highest winds at 127 km/h (79 mph)

=== Washington and Oregon ===
High wind and heavy rain worsened flooding from another storm that caused historic flooding in Washington. 350,000 in Washington and 200,000 in Oregon were without power early on December 17.

=== Colorado ===
Colorado experienced some of the most severe impacts of the storm. Early on December 18, over 100,000 customers were without power across Colorado. For the first time in the state's history, the National Weather Service in Boulder issued a "Particularly Dangerous Situation" (PDS) Red Flag Warning on December 19. High winds, peaking at 108 miles per hour (174 km/h) at the NCAR Mesa in Boulder, caused widespread infrastructure damage. To mitigate wildfire risks from downed lines, Xcel Energy proactively shut off power to over 69,000 customers. Despite these measures, a major wildfire, designated "Fire 33," burned approximately 12,000 to 40,000 acres in Yuma County.

=== Kansas and Nebraska ===
In Western Kansas, the high winds caused the catastrophic failure of the KLOE 730 AM transmitter tower near Goodland. Engineering inspections found that the tower's base insulators failed under the wind load, causing the structure to lean and forcing the station off the air for an extended period. In Nebraska, gusts reached 63 miles per hour (101 km/h) in Sidney and 68 miles per hour (109 km/h) at Chadron State Park, leading to localized power outages and dust storms that reduced visibility to near zero.

=== Montana ===
In Montana, the windstorm brought a combination of hurricane-force gusts and hazardous blowing snow, particularly across the western and central portions of the state. The National Weather Service (NWS) in Missoula and Great Falls issued High Wind Warnings as a powerful Pacific front crossed the Continental Divide, creating a "downslope" acceleration that battered communities from the Bitterroot Valley to the Hi-Line. Wind gusts in mountainous areas and through mountain passes reached extreme levels, with some sensors recording speeds in excess of 90 miles per hour (140 km/h). In the valleys, sustained winds of 40–50 miles per hour (64–80 km/h) with higher gusts were common. High winds toppled numerous mature trees, some of which fell onto homes and parked vehicles. The Montana Free Press reported that a portion of the roof was partially stripped from an elementary school, leading to emergency repairs. Residents reported widespread power outages as branches were thrown into lines. In Butte, the combination of wind and sudden temperature drops created "flash freeze" conditions on roadways, making travel nearly impossible on the evening of December 17. The severity of the gusts led to significant disruptions in daily life. Several school districts in Western Montana, including those in the Missoula area, opted for early releases or shifted to remote learning on December 18. This was done to ensure students were not on the streets or in buses when the strongest "mountain wave" gusts were expected to hit. NorthWestern Energy and local electric cooperatives reported that at the height of the storm, over 15,000 customers were without power across the state. Repair crews were often delayed because it was unsafe to use bucket trucks in sustained winds exceeding 35 miles per hour (56 km/h). A maximum snowfall of 12 in (30 cm) was reported southwest of Dupuyer.

=== Idaho ===
High winds in Fernan Lake Village led to a tree to fall into a 55-year-old man's home, killing him. While waiting for a bus on December 17, two children were injured in Twin Falls as well due to strong winds causing trees and power lines to collapse. Deputies covered 22 weather-related incidents, which included downed power lines and trees.

=== New Mexico ===
In New Mexico, the "Chinook" effect led to gusts of 75 miles per hour (121 km/h) in the Northeast Highlands. The dust storms in the Tularosa Basin were so severe they were visible from meteorological satellites, and local officials in Las Vegas, New Mexico, reported damage to roof structures and commercial signage.

=== Oklahoma and Texas ===
The southern edge of the storm system brought record-breaking heat to the Southern Plains. Oklahoma City reached 76 °F (24 °C) on December 19, shattering the previous daily record. In the Texas Panhandle, the combination of 60 miles per hour (97 km/h) winds and extreme drought led to multiple grass fires near Amarillo. The heat wave extended into North Texas, where Dallas-Fort Worth recorded a high of 79 °F (26 °C), leading to an unusual surge in electricity demand for cooling in mid-December. Governor Greg Abbott declared a drought disaster for Texas.

=== Wyoming ===
Wyoming recorded some of the highest wind speeds of the event, including a gust of 144 miles per hour (232 km/h) near Smoot and 112 miles per hour (180 km/h) in Platte County. The Wyoming Department of Transportation (WYDOT) reported nearly 40 blow-over crashes involving high-profile vehicles in a three-day span, leading to the closure of I-80 and I-25 to light trailers. 123 miles per hour (198 km/h) gusts were reported on South Pass between Farson and Lander. The extreme winds, combined with unseasonably warm temperatures and dry vegetation, fanned multiple grass fires. In Laramie County, a fast-moving wildfire in the Winchester Hills area south of Cheyenne prompted emergency evacuations on the evening of December 17. Every fire district in the county responded to the blaze before residents were eventually allowed to return home. Infrastructure damage was widespread, with power poles snapped and lines downed across the state. In Pine Bluffs an emergency power outage affected the west side of town after the winds caused significant storm damage to the local grid. While Colorado utilities implemented proactive shutoffs, Wyoming utilities such as Black Hills Energy and Rocky Mountain Power remained operational but maintained high-alert monitoring as gusts continued to batter the I-25 corridor.

=== South Dakota ===
South Dakota saw a split in impacts between the western Black Hills and the eastern plains. High winds in excess of 100 miles per hour (160 km/h) caused widespread destruction in the Rapid City area. A radio tower on Skyline Drive was toppled, and a large commercial sign at a car dealership was blown onto a row of vehicles. In Rapid City alone, four schools were forced to close on Friday, December 19, due to persistent power outages. Utility companies advised residents to prepare for multi-day outages as the winds made it too dangerous for crews to repair lines. The National Weather Service in Sioux Falls issued a High Wind Warning with gusts up to 70 miles per hour (110 km/h), causing "flash freeze" conditions on roads as temperatures plummeted behind the cold front. 4.7 in (12 cm) of snow fell east-southeast of Cheyenne Crossing.

=== Central and eastern United States ===
The strong winds due to the tight pressure gradient as well as falling and blowing snow created near blizzard conditions in parts of the Upper Midwest and the Great Lakes. Rain occurred in the southern Midwest, the Mississippi River, and Ohio Valleys on December 18. The central United States saw delays in airports. The storm arrived to the East Coast on the night of December 18. Heavy rain and strong winds led to disruptions in air travel across the Northeast. A gust of 68 miles per hour (109 km/h) occurred in New London, Connecticut. Bridgeport, Connecticut also set a daily rainfall record on December 19. Over 21,000 in Connecticut were without power on December 20. Portions of US 40 in New Jersey were closed due to flooding. The state also saw a wind gust of 52 mph (84 km/h) in Lower Alloways Creek Township. The storm also brought record high temperatures to Burlington, Vermont and Albany, New York on December 19, ahead of a flash freeze. This broke up bitterly cold conditions felt across the Northeast through much of December.

=== Other effects ===
The storm was accompanied by an extraordinary "winter thaw." Temperatures in North Texas were forecast to reach near-record highs of 79 °F (26 °C) by December 21, while Denver recorded a high of 71 °F (22 °C) on December 19. The heat, combined with single-digit humidity, created desert-like conditions in the middle of December.

Salt Lake City broke its daily heat record on December 11, and the warmth has persisted through the current storm event. NWS meteorologists in the region noted the anomaly was so extreme it felt like "late summer." In several Plains cities, including Goodland, Kansas, the highest temperatures of the day were recorded in the middle of the night. This was caused by the intense windstorm mixing warmer air from higher in the atmosphere down to the surface. Unlike typical Decembers where heating is the primary concern, utility companies in Texas and Oklahoma reported an "unusual surge" in electricity demand for air conditioning. Agronomists are monitoring the impact on winter wheat. The extreme warmth can cause the crop to "break dormancy" too early, leaving it vulnerable to the inevitable return of freezing temperatures later in the season.

== See also ==
- 2025–26 North American winter
