= Inverness—Richmond =

Former federal electoral district in Nova Scotia, Canada

Nova Scotia electoral district

Defunct federal electoral district
- Legislature: House of Commons
- District created: 1933
- District abolished: 1966
- First contested: 1935
- Last contested: 1965

Inverness—Richmond was a federal electoral district in the province of Nova Scotia, Canada, that was represented in the House of Commons of Canada from 1935 to 1968.

This riding was created in 1933 from parts of Inverness and Richmond—West Cape Breton ridings. It consisted of the counties of Inverness and Richmond and part of the county of Cape Breton (the municipal districts of Bateston (No. 24), Catalone (No. 15), Gabarus (No. 7), Grand Mira (No. 17), Louisburg Parish (No. 6), Main-à-Dieu (No. 5), and Trout Brook (No. 16)), including the town of Louisburg.

It was abolished in 1966 when it was redistributed between Cape Breton Highlands—Canso and Cape Breton—East Richmond ridings.

== Members of Parliament ==
This riding elected the following members of Parliament:

Parliament	Years	Member	Party
Inverness—Richmond; Riding created from Inverness and Richmond—West Cape Breton
18th	1935–1940	Donald MacLennan	Liberal
19th	1940–1945	Moses Elijah McGarry	Liberal
20th	1945–1949	Moses Elijah McGarry	Liberal
21st	1949–1953	William F. Carroll	Liberal
22nd	1953–1957	Allan MacEachen	Liberal
23rd	1957–1958	Allan MacEachen	Liberal
24th	1958–1962	Robert MacLellan	Progressive Conservative
25th	1962–1963	Allan MacEachen	Liberal
26th	1963–1965	Allan MacEachen	Liberal
27th	1965–1968	Allan MacEachen	Liberal
Riding dissolved into Cape Breton Highlands—Canso and Cape Breton—East Richmond

== Election results ==
1935 Canadian federal election
Party	Candidate	Votes
Liberal	Donald MacLennan	9,488
Conservative	Isaac Duncan MacDougall	4,672
Reconstruction	Benjamin A. Leblanc	2,648

1940 Canadian federal election
Party	Candidate	Votes
Liberal	Moses Elijah McGarry	9,123
National Government	Isaac Duncan MacDougall	7,069

1945 Canadian federal election
Party	Candidate	Votes
Liberal	Moses Elijah McGarry	8,177
Progressive Conservative	William Raymond Pearo	5,037
Co-operative Commonwealth	Edward Boutin Doyle	1,720

1949 Canadian federal election
Party	Candidate	Votes
Liberal	William F. Carroll	10,584
Progressive Conservative	Donald Lewis MacDonald	5,082

1953 Canadian federal election
Party	Candidate	Votes
Liberal	Allan MacEachen	9,033
Progressive Conservative	William Charles Boudreau	5,302

1957 Canadian federal election
Party	Candidate	Votes
Liberal	Allan MacEachen	8,035
Progressive Conservative	Robert Simpson MacLellan	7,177

1958 Canadian federal election
Party	Candidate	Votes
Progressive Conservative	Robert MacLellan	7,725
Liberal	Allan MacEachen	7,709

1962 Canadian federal election
Party	Candidate	Votes
Liberal	Allan MacEachen	8,331
Progressive Conservative	Robert MacLellan	7,333
New Democratic	Gerard V. Chiasson	816

1963 Canadian federal election
Party	Candidate	Votes
Liberal	Allan MacEachen	8,373
Progressive Conservative	Leo Boudreau	7,013

1965 Canadian federal election
Party	Candidate	Votes
Liberal	Allan MacEachen	8,137
Progressive Conservative	Herman A. Samson	6,798
New Democratic	Allan Bragg	427

== See also ==
- List of Canadian electoral districts
- Historical federal electoral districts of Canada
