= John William Welbourn =

Canadian politician

John W. Welbourn

Member of Parliament for Jasper—Edson
- In office 1949–1953
- Preceded by: Walter Frederick Kuhl
- Succeeded by: Charles Yuill

Personal details
- Born: April 11, 1900 Edmonton, Alberta, Canada
- Died: November 14, 1965 (aged 65) Victoria, British Columbia, Canada
- Party: Liberal
- Profession: farmer

John William Welbourn (April 11, 1900 – November 14, 1965) was a farmer and a Canadian federal politician. He was born in Edmonton.

Welbourn first ran for a seat in the House of Commons of Canada as a Liberal candidate in the 1945 federal election. He was defeated by incumbent Member of Parliament Walter Kuhl. Kuhl would run again in the 1949 federal election he would defeat Kuhl gaining almost 3000 votes from his previous total to win the Jasper—Edson electoral district. Welbourn would serve one term in office before being defeated by Charles Yuill in the 1953 federal election. He died at Victoria, British Columbia in 1965.
