= Dr. John Hugh Gillis Regional High School =

Location
- 105 Braemore Avenue; Antigonish, Nova Scotia, B2G 1L3; Canada; 45.623°N 62.007°W

Information
- School type: High school
- Founded: 1970
- School board: Strait Regional Centre for Education
- Principal: Cory Austen (acting)
- Grades: 9–12
- Enrollment: 823 (2023–2024)
- Language: English
- Area: Antigonish Town and County
- Colours: Blue and red
- Team name: Royals
- Website: drjhg.srce.ca

Dr. John Hugh Gillis Regional High School (often referred to as The Regional or Dr J) is a secondary school located in Antigonish, Nova Scotia, Canada. It is attended by approximately 823 students in grades 9 to 12. The school used to fall under the jurisdiction of the Strait Regional School Board, until the school board system was cancelled in the 2018–19 school year. Dr. John Hugh Gillis Regional High School was ranked fourth among Nova Scotian schools in 2009.

== Name ==
The school was formerly known as Antigonish Regional High School, but the name was changed in the mid 1980s to honour a superintendent forced into retirement due to illness.

== Sports ==
The school's sports teams are nicknamed the Royals's or sometimes the Regional Royals, and since the school name change that came into effect in 1985, the school is often referred to as Doctor J.

== International Baccalaureate Programme ==
The school began teaching the IB Diploma Programme in September 2007. It has been an IB World School since April 2007 (IB World School Code 002932). Subjects taught include English literature, mathematics, visual arts, history, sciences.
