= Allen Sulatycky =

Canadian politician

Member of the Canadian Parliament for Rocky Mountain
- In office 1968–1972
- Succeeded by: Joe Clark

Personal details
- Born: June 13, 1938 (age 88) Hafford, Saskatchewan
- Party: Liberal Party of Canada
- Education: University of Saskatchewan
- Occupation: lawyer, judge

Allen B. Sulatycky, (born June 13, 1938), is a Canadian judge and former politician.

== Biography ==
He was born at Hafford, Saskatchewan, and educated at Hafford and the University of Saskatchewan (B.A., LL.B 1962). Sulatycky was called to the Alberta bar in 1963. He practiced law in Edmonton and Whitecourt, Alberta from 1963 to 1969. He was an unsuccessful Liberal candidate in the November 6, 1967, by-election in Jasper—Edson. He was elected to the House of Commons for Rocky Mountain defeating Douglas Marmaduke Caston in the 1968 federal election as a Liberal candidate. Sulatycky was parliamentary secretary to John James Greene, Minister of Energy, Mines and Resources, 1971, then Parliamentary Secretary to Jean Chrétien, Minister of Indian Affairs and Northern Development, 1972. He was defeated in the October 30, 1972 General Election by Joe Clark.

He practiced law at Edmonton and Calgary, Alberta, from 1973 to 1982. On November 4, 1982, he was appointed Justice of the Court of Queen's Bench of Alberta. Sulatycky was elevated to the Alberta Court of Appeal on July 7, 1997. He was named Associate Chief Justice of the Court of Queen's Bench of Alberta on December 12, 2000. On December 12, 2004, he was elected to sit as a supernumerary judge and retired as Associate Chief Justice.

He is married to the former Marylin Joyce Perkins, with four children: Warren, Robert, Annemarie and Donald.
