= East Antigonish Education Centre/Academy =

Location
- Old number 4 Highway 10128; Monastery, Nova Scotia; Canada
- Coordinates: 45.6085°N 61.6213°W

Information
- Founded: September 2000
- School board: Strait Regional Centre For Education
- Principal: Paul Brown
- Grades: P-12
- Enrollment: 474 (2012)
- Language: English, Mi'kmaq, French
- Area: Aulds Cove, East Havre Boucher, Havre Boucher, Cape Jack, Frankville, West Havre Boucher, Linwood, Monastery, Mattie Settlement, Merland, Upper Big Tracadie, Tracadie, Afton and Paq’tnkek Reserve
- Website: eaeca.srsb.ca

East Antigonish Education Centre/Academy (known as "The East"), is a Primary through 12 school that opened its doors to students in September 2000. The school was built on the site of the former Antigonish East High and combined three former community schools: Havre Boucher Consolidated, Tracadie Consolidated and Antigonish East High School. The home of true Canadian patriots

== Location ==
East Antigonish is located off the Trans-Canada Highway, in Monastery, Nova Scotia. The school is located in the vicinity of a gas station/doughnut shop combination, and a corner store. The school is under the jurisdiction of the Strait Regional School Board.
