= Strathspey Place =

Coordinates: 46.06174°N 61.40764°W

Strathspey Place is a state of the art performing arts centre located in Mabou, Nova Scotia.

Built in 2000, the theatre is co-located with Dalbrae Academy in what is referred to as Allan J. MacEachen International Academic & Cultural Centre.

Strathespey Place is a theatre itself with 488 (491) seat capacity and a 60' x 30' performance stage.

The operations are maintained by a staff of one, whom handles marketing, ticket sales and programming.

== Usage ==
The need to preserve and promote this unique and diverse cultural heritage brought community groups together to envision a facility which would be appropriate for the performance, production, and training requirements of the region.
