= Cape Breton Highlands Education Centre =

Cape Breton Highlands Education Centre / Academy

Location
- 11070 Cabot Trail (Physical); PO Box 3 Margaree Harbour, B0E 2B0 (mailing); Terre Noire, Nova Scotia; Canada
- Coordinates: 46.46222°N 61.08986°W

Information
- Type: Public
- Motto: Strength in Diversity - La diversité, c'est la force
- Founded: 2000
- School board: Strait Regional School Board
- Principal: Rick Welton
- Grades: Primary-12
- Enrollment: 363
- Area: Margaree area, Chéticamp and Pleasant Bay
- Colors: Black, Royal Blue, White & Silver
- Mascot: Husky
- Team name: Huskies
- Website: cbheca.srce.ca

Cape Breton Highlands Educations Centre and Academy (CBHEC/A) is a school located in Terre Noire, Nova Scotia, Canada, in the Cape Breton Highlands in Inverness County.

It is a part of the Strait Regional School Board and is attended by roughly 300 students from grades primary to twelve.

The school's construction was completed in 2000 to take in students from North East Margaree Consolidated Elementary School, Margaree Forks District High School and Pleasant Bay School. It also acquired students from l'École NDA in Chéticamp. The school is currently attended, in large part, by students from the Margaree area, Chéticamp and Pleasant Bay.

The high school's sports teams are the Huskies. Their colours are black, royal blue, white and silver.

== Administration ==
- Principal: Stacia Evans
- Vice Principals: Rick Welton

== Athletics ==
- X-Country Running
- Soccer
- Volleyball
- Basketball
- Softball
- Table Tennis
- Track and Field
- Hockey
- Rugby

== Atlantic Institute for Market Studies (AIMS) ==
During the 2007–2008, 2008-2009 and 2009-2010 school years, the Atlantic Institute for Market Studies (AIMS) deemed CBHEC/A the best school in Nova Scotia. During the 2010–2011 school year, the school dropped into the institute's second-place slot.
