= Port Hood Consolidated School =

School in Nova Scotia, Canada

Port Hood Consolidated School was a school in Port Hood, Nova Scotia, Canada, that was open from fall 1962 until spring 2000.

== Establishment ==
The construction of Port Hood Consolidated School began in fall 1961 and concluded in spring 1962. The school was built to replace Port Hood Academy, which was destroyed by fire in May 1961. Port Hood Academy had been built in 1911 and served students for 50 years.

Within days of the fire, concerned citizens and school board officials began to look at proposals for the construction of a new school. Due to the organized efforts of local citizens, the decision was made to build a P-12 school on the former site of the Port Hood Academy.

Students began the 1962–63 school year in the new Port Hood Consolidated School. The school was officially opened on October 16, 1963. The event was marked by the appearance of the Premier of Nova Scotia and Minister of Education Robert L. Stanfield, his wife Mary and local dignitaries.

A number of local schools were closed prior to the establishment of Port Hood Consolidated School. These included St. Peter's Convent School, Harbourview School, Dunmore School, Baden School (South West Mabou), Glencoe Station School and Hawthorne School. Margaret-Ann Memorial School on Port Hood Island remained open, but soon began to send its senior high students to the new consolidated school.

== Facilities ==
The school was a relatively spacious and modern structure consisting of twelve classrooms, a science laboratory, a multipurpose room with stage, a domestic science room, a furnace room, a janitor's room, a principal's office and a staff room. The building was staffed by seventeen teachers and a full-time janitor.

== Closure ==
After nearly 40 years of operation, the closure of Port Hood Consolidated and was announced for spring 2000. Former students would attend the P-8 Bayview Education Centre and 9-12 Dalbrae Academy, which opened in fall 2000.
