= Strait Area Education and Recreation Centre =

Location
- 304 Pitt Street, Unit 1 Port Hawkesbury, Nova Scotia, B9A 2T9; Canada

Information
- Type: High School
- Founded: September 1977
- School board: Strait Regional School Board
- Principal: Jill Burton
- Grades: 9-12
- Enrollment: 374
- Colours: Green and White
- Mascot: Saint
- Website: saerc.ednet.ns.ca

Strait Area Education and Recreation Centre (SAERC) is a high school located in Port Hawkesbury, Nova Scotia, Canada. It is attended by approximately 400 students in grades 9 to 12. The school is also home to a community swimming pool, as well as a public library, SAERC FM and SAERC TV. The school falls under the jurisdiction of the Strait Regional School Board.

== Notable alumni ==
- Lynn Coady
- Mark Day
- Allie MacDonald
