= Dale C. Thomson =

Canadian political scientist, author and historian

Professor Dale Cairns Thomson DFC
- Born: 17 June 1923; Westlock, Alberta
- Died: 27 April 1999 (aged 75)
- Education: University of Paris (PhD)
- Occupation: Professor of Political Science
- Political party: Liberal Party of Canada

Dale Cairns Thomson DFC (17 June 1923 – 27 April 1999) was a professor and departmental director at the Université de Montréal, professor and Vice-Principal of McGill University and a professor of international relations and Director of the Center of Canadian Studies at Johns Hopkins University's School of Advanced International Studies in Washington, D.C. and the author of several important historical works.

Born on a Westlock, Alberta farm, Dale Thomson served in the Royal Canadian Air Force during World War II and was awarded the Distinguished Flying Cross. At the end of the war, he attended the University of Alberta, graduating with a B.A. degree in 1948. Fluent in the French language, he then obtained a diploma in international relations from the University of Paris in 1950 and his doctorate from the university's Faculty of Letters in 1951. To do his thesis entitled "General Haushofer and his Ideas on Geopolitics," Thomson spent time in Germany, becoming fluent in the German language.

Returning to Canada, Thomson worked for a short time at the National Film Board of Canada before being invited to serve as Associate Private Secretary to Canadian Prime Minister, Louis St. Laurent where he remained until 1958. Involved with both the Liberal Party of Quebec and the Liberal Party of Canada, in the 1958 Canadian federal election Thomson was the unsuccessful Liberal candidate in the Jasper—Edson riding.

Following his brief foray into politics, Thomson returned to academia where he forged an outstanding career that included authoring a number of important books. In addition, he wrote articles in the Canadian press and was a frequent television and radio guest commentator concerning Canadian politics.

Dale Thomson died in 1999 after a lengthy illness. His archive is held at the McGill University Archives.

== Academic positions ==
- Université de Montréal - professor (1960–1969), departmental director (1963–1967)
- Johns Hopkins University's School of Advanced International Studies - professor of international relations and founding director of the Director of the Center of Canadian Studies (1969–1973)
- McGill University - Vice-Principal (1973–1976) and Professor of Political Science (1973–1994)

== Affiliations ==
- Association for Canadian Studies in the United States
- Canadian Political Science Association/Société Canadienne de Science Politique
- International Society for Political Psychology
- International Association for Mass Communication Research
- Member of the Board of Directors of the International Centre for Ethnic Studies, Sri Lanka

== Books ==
- Alexander Mackenzie : Clear Grit (1960)
- Louis St. Laurent, Canadian (1967)
- Canadian Foreign Policy : Options And Perspectives (with Roger F. Swanson, 1971)
- Quebec Society And Politics: Views From The Inside (1973)
- Mémoire à la Commission parlementaire de l'Assemblée nationale du Québec à propos du projet de loi no 1, Charte de la langue française au Québec (1977)
- Jean Lesage & The Quiet Revolution (1984)
- Vive le Québec Libre (1988)
