= Cape Breton Highlands—Canso =

Former federal electoral district in Nova Scotia, Canada

Nova Scotia electoral district

Defunct federal electoral district
- Legislature: House of Commons
- District created: 1966
- District abolished: 1996
- First contested: 1968
- Last contested: 1993

Cape Breton Highlands—Canso was a federal electoral district in the province of Nova Scotia, Canada, that was represented in the House of Commons of Canada from 1968 to 1997.

== History ==
This riding was created in 1966 from Antigonish—Guysborough, Inverness—Richmond and North Cape Breton and Victoria ridings.

It consisted initially of:

- the counties of Antigonish and Inverness, and
- parts of the counties of Guysborough, Victoria and Richmond.

In 1987, it was redefined to consist of:

- the County of Antigonish, and
- parts of the Counties of Inverness, Victoria, Richmond and Guysborough lying to the east of the meridian of Longitude 62(30'00" West.

It was abolished in 1996 when it was redistributed into Bras d'Or, Pictou—Antigonish—Guysborough and Sydney—Victoria ridings.

== Members of Parliament ==
Parliament	Years	Member	Party
Cape Breton Highlands—Canso; Riding created from Antigonish—Guysborough, Inverness—Richmond and North Cape Breton and Victoria
28th	1968–1972	Allan MacEachen	Liberal
29th	1972–1974	Allan MacEachen	Liberal
30th	1974–1979	Allan MacEachen	Liberal
31st	1979–1980	Allan MacEachen	Liberal
32nd	1980–1984	Allan MacEachen	Liberal
33rd	1984–1988	Lawrence O'Neil	Progressive Conservative
34th	1988–1993	Francis LeBlanc	Liberal
35th	1993–1997	Francis LeBlanc	Liberal
Riding dissolved into Bras d'Or, Pictou—Antigonish—Guysborough and Sydney—Victoria

== Election results ==
1968 Canadian federal election
Party	Candidate	Votes
Liberal	Allan J. MacEachen	13,725
Progressive Conservative	D. Hugh Gillis	13,195
New Democratic	Ieva Jessens	445

1972 Canadian federal election
Party	Candidate	Votes
Liberal	Allan J. MacEachen	16,929
Progressive Conservative	Angus MacIsaac	14,463
New Democratic	Robert Schwaab	1,929

1974 Canadian federal election
Party	Candidate	Votes
Liberal	Allan J. MacEachen	17,977
Progressive Conservative	Angus MacIsaac	12,401
New Democratic	Alick Mackenzie Slater	1,819

1979 Canadian federal election
Party	Candidate	Votes
Liberal	Allan J. MacEachen	17,047
Progressive Conservative	F.B. William Bill Kelly	13,736
New Democratic	William J. Woodfine	4,657

1980 Canadian federal election
Party	Candidate	Votes
Liberal	Allan J. MacEachen	18,262
Progressive Conservative	F.B. William Bill Kelly	12,799
New Democratic	William J. Woodfine	4,902
Independent	Elizabeth May	272

1984 Canadian federal election
Party	Candidate	Votes
Progressive Conservative	Lawrence O'Neil	19,371
Liberal	Kenzie MacKinnon	15,026
New Democratic	Daniel W. MacInnes	4,308

1988 Canadian federal election
Party	Candidate	Votes
Liberal	Francis LeBlanc	20,318
Progressive Conservative	Lawrence O'Neil	17,557
New Democratic	Wilf Cude	2,036

1993 Canadian federal election
Party	Candidate	Votes
Liberal	Francis LeBlanc	22,713
Progressive Conservative	Lewis MacKinnon	7,916
Reform	Henry Van Berkel	2,972
New Democratic	Junior Bernard	1,375
Natural Law	Earl Lafford	337

== See also ==
- List of Canadian electoral districts
- Historical federal electoral districts of Canada
