= Charles Yuill =

Canadian politician

Member of the Canadian Parliament for Jasper—Edson
- In office 1953–1958
- Preceded by: John William Welbourn
- Succeeded by: Hugh Horner

Personal details
- Born: August 14, 1889 Calabogie, Ontario
- Died: July 30, 1972 (aged 82) Barrhead, Alberta
- Party: Social Credit Party of Canada

Charles Yuill (August 14, 1889 – July 30, 1972) was a former Mayor of Barrhead, Alberta and served as a Canadian federal politician from 1953 to 1958. He was born in Calabogie, Ontario.

Yuill began his political career by serving as Mayor of the Village of Barrhead and then Mayor of the Town of Barrhead, Alberta north of Edmonton, Alberta. He campaigned for a seat in the House of Commons of Canada representing the Jasper—Edson riding for the first time in the 1953 federal election, and defeated incumbent Member of Parliament John Welbourn and 2 other candidates to win his first term in office. Yuill was re-elected in the 1957 federal election he won a closely contested race defeating 3 other candidates. Parliament was dissolved almost a full year later and Yuill ran for a 3rd term in the 1958 federal election, but was defeated by Progressive Conservative candidate Hugh Horner. Yuill ran against Horner once more in the 1962 federal election but failed to gain back his seat.
