= Strait Regional Centre for Education =

School district in Nova Scotia, Canada

Location
- Port Hastings, Nova Scotia Canada

District information
- Regional Executive Director of Education: Paul Landry
- Schools: 25

Students and staff
- Students: 6,304 (2015-16)

Other information
- Website: www.srce.ca

Strait Regional Centre for Education is a Canadian school district operating in eastern Nova Scotia's counties of Richmond, Antigonish, Inverness, and Guysborough.

The centre has a student population of 7,281 and it employs 612 teachers. The annual budget of the board is approximately $66 million (CAD).

The centre was created on April 1, 2018, replacing the Strait Regional School Board.

== Schools ==
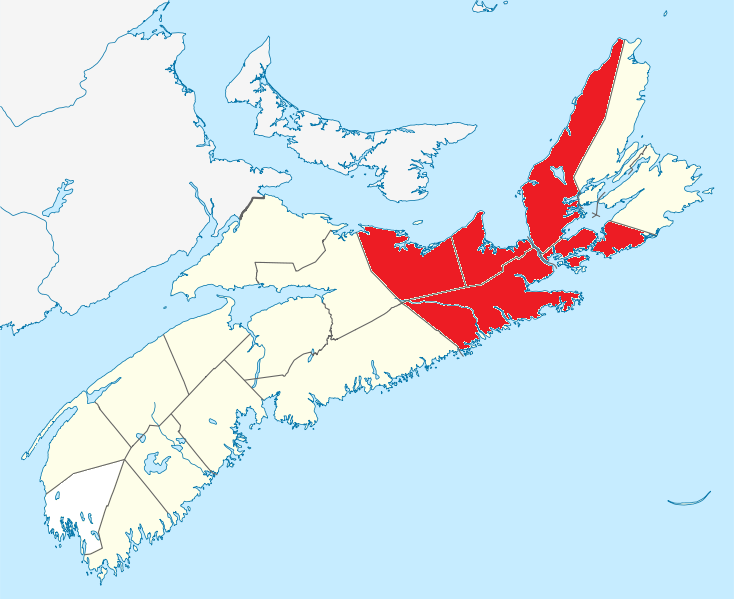
Coverage map of the school board

- Inverness County
  - Pleasant Bay School - Grades Primary to 6
  - Cape Breton Highlands Education Centre/Academy - Grades Primary to 12
  - Inverness Education Centre/Academy - Grades Primary to 12
  - Dalbrae Academy - Grades 9 to 12
  - Bayview Education Centre - Grades Primary to 8
  - Whycocomagh Education Centre - Grades Primary to 8
  - SAERC - Grades 9 to 12
  - Tamarac Education Centre - Grades Primary to 8
- Richmond County
  - East Richmond Education Centre - Grades Primary to 8
  - Felix Marchand Education Centre - Grades Primary to 4
  - Richmond Academy - Grades 9 to 12
  - West Richmond Education Centre - Grades 5 to 8
- Antigonish County
  - East Antigonish Education Centre/Academy - Grades Primary to 12
  - Rev. H.J. MacDonald School - Grades Primary to 6 (No Longer open as a school, being turned into a community centre.)
  - St. Andrew's Consolidated School - Grades Primary to 6
  - Dr. John Hugh Gillis Regional High School - Grades 9 to 12
  - Antigonish Education Centre - Grades Primary to 4
  - St. Andrew Junior School - Grades 5 to 8
  - H.M. MacDonald Elementary School - Grades Primary to 6
- Guysborough County
  - Mulgrave Memorial Education Centre - Grades Primary to 8
  - Chedabucto Education Centre/Guysborough Academy - Grades Primary to 12
  - Fanning Education Centre - Grades Primary to 8
  - Canso Academy - Grades 9 to 12
  - St. Mary's Academy (Nova Scotia) - Grades 8 to 12
  - St. Mary's Education Centre - Grades Primary to 7

== Former schools ==
=== Whycocomagh Consolidated School ===
Whycocomagh Consolidated School (WCS) was a grade primary to grade 12 school located in Whycocomagh, Nova Scotia, Canada. It closed in 2000, after Dalbrae Academy was opened as the new high school for the students in the area and a new school was built for grades primary to eight. The school's colours were royal blue and gold, and the high school teams were called Whycocomagh Thunder. The school fell under the jurisdiction of the Strait Regional School Board. The closure of the school came after a long battle with the government.

== Members ==
Board Member	District #	District Name
Judy Bernard-Julian	N/A	First Nations Representative
Clarence Reddick	N/A	African Nova Scotia Representative
Brenda Gillis	1	North Inverness
Gerald MacDonald	2	Central Inverness
Mary Jess MacDonald (Vice Chair)	3	South Inverness
George Kehoe (chair)	4	West Richmond
Pam Cotton	5	East Richmond
Michael G. Brown	6	Town of Antigonish
Henry Van Berkel	7	West Antigonish
Frank Machnik	8	East Antigonish
Rosalee Parker	9	East Guysborough
Kim Horton	10	West Guysborough
