= Rocky Mountain (federal electoral district) =

Former federal electoral district in Alberta, Canada

Alberta electoral district

Defunct federal electoral district
- Legislature: House of Commons
- District created: 1966
- District abolished: 1979
- First contested: 1968
- Last contested: 1974

Rocky Mountain was a federal electoral district in Alberta, Canada, that was represented in the House of Commons of Canada from 1968 to 1979. This riding was created in 1966 from parts of Bow River, Jasper—Edson, Lethbridge, and Macleod ridings.

It was abolished in 1976 when it was redistributed into Bow River, Calgary South, Lethbridge—Foothills, Peace River, Red Deer and Yellowhead ridings.

== Members of Parliament ==
Rocky Mountain
| Parliament | Years | Member | Party |
|---|---|---|---|
District created from Bow River, Jasper—Edson, Lethbridge, and Macleod
| 28th | 1968–1972 | Allen Sulatycky | Liberal |
| 29th | 1972–1974 | Joe Clark | Progressive Conservative |
| 30th | 1974–1979 | Joe Clark | Progressive Conservative |
District redistributed into Bow River, Calgary South, Lethbridge—Foothills, Peace River, Red Deer, and Yellowhead

== Election results ==
1974 Canadian federal election
| Party | Candidate | Votes | % | ±% |
|---|---|---|---|---|
| Progressive Conservative | Joe Clark | 16,042 | 61.09 | +9.47 |
| Liberal | Arthur Yates | 6,236 | 23.75 | –7.95 |
| New Democratic | Bob Wrigley | 2,750 | 10.47 | –1.90 |
| Social Credit | Cecil J. Speirs | 1,230 | 4.68 | +0.39 |
| Total valid votes | | 26,258 | 99.76 | |
| Total rejected ballots | | 64 | 0.24 | –6.57 |
| Turnout | | 26,322 | 64.66 | –8.21 |
| Eligible voters | | 40,711 | | |
| Progressive Conservative hold | | Swing | | +8.71 |
Source: Library of Parliament

1972 Canadian federal election
| Party | Candidate | Votes | % | ±% |
|---|---|---|---|---|
| Progressive Conservative | Joe Clark | 12,984 | 51.63 | +3.57 |
| Liberal | Allen Sulatycky | 7,973 | 31.70 | –5.99 |
| New Democratic | Al Cheney | 3,112 | 12.37 | +1.65 |
| Social Credit | Brian Ganske | 1,080 | 4.29 | – |
| Total valid votes | | 25,149 | 93.19 | |
| Total rejected ballots | | 1,839 | 6.81 | +6.09 |
| Turnout | | 26,988 | 72.87 | +3.57 |
| Eligible voters | | 37,037 | | |
| Progressive Conservative gain from Liberal | | Swing | | +4.78 |
Source: Library of Parliament

1968 Canadian federal election
| Party | Candidate | Votes | % | ±% |
|---|---|---|---|---|
| Liberal | Allen Sulatycky | 7,355 | 37.70 | – |
| Progressive Conservative | Hugh Gourlay | 5,792 | 29.68 | – |
| Progressive Conservative | Douglas Caston | 3,585 | 18.37 | – |
| New Democratic | Searle Elmer Hornby | 2,093 | 10.73 | – |
| Independent Liberal | John William McLeod | 412 | 2.11 | – |
| Independent Liberal | Collier Maberley | 275 | 1.41 | – |
| Total valid votes | | 19,512 | 99.28 | |
| Total rejected ballots | | 142 | 0.72 | – |
| Turnout | | 19,654 | 69.30 | – |
| Eligible voters | | 28,360 | | |
| Liberal hold | | Swing | | – |
Source: Library of Parliament

== See also ==
- List of Canadian electoral districts
- Historical federal electoral districts of Canada
