= Dalbrae Academy =

Location
- 11156 Highway 9 (Ceilidh Trail); Mabou, Nova Scotia, B0E 1X0; Canada; 46.062°N 61.408°W

Information
- Type: High School
- Motto: Intelligence, Integrity, Intensity
- Founded: 2000
- School board: Strait Regional School Board
- Principal: Carol Smith
- Grades: 9-12
- Enrollment: 261
- Language: English
- Colors: Blue, Red and Gold
- Mascot: Dragon
- Website: www.dalbrae.ednet.ns.ca

Dalbrae Academy is a secondary school located in Mabou, Nova Scotia, Canada. It is attended by 261 students in grades 9 to 12. The school falls under the jurisdiction of the Strait Regional School Board. The Principal is Carol Smith and the Vice Principal is Cindy MacDonald.

== History ==
The school opened in 2000 after several years of discussion with the provincial government over the closure of four local P-12 schools. As a part of the Nova Scotian governments school consolidation process in the late nineties, four schools were closed in the area:

- Mabou Consolidated School (MCS)
- Whycocomagh Consolidated School (WCS)
- Judique-Creignish Consolidated School (JCHS)
- Port Hood Consolidated (PHC)

The schools were amalgamated into three new schools: Dalbrae Academy, and the two new P-8 schools- Whycocomagh Education Centre (Whycocomagh), and Bayview Education Centre (Port Hood).

Dalbrae, together with the Strathspey Place performing arts centre, forms a part of the Allan J. MacEachen International Academic and Cultural Centre. The name Dalbrae is a portmanteau of the Scottish Gaelic words dail and brae, which, when combined, refer to a "meeting place on the hill".

== Athletics ==
The school has a track located at the back of the facility. In the 2006-2007 Athletic year, the Girls Basketball team won the school's first ever NSSAF Division 3 Provincial Championship, going undefeated in divisional play. In the 2008-2009 School year, the Dalbrae ROV team won the international ROV competition in Buzzards Bay, Massachusetts. In the 2009-2010 School year, Dalbrae Academy was host to a weekly sketch comedy show known as 'Cut Outs and Play House'. All donations and proceeds made went towards Haiti relief efforts.

The Table Tennis team has won the Regional Banner three consecutive times. They came third in provincials in 2009 and were fourth for the next two years.
