= Walter Frederick Kuhl =

Canadian politician

Walter Kuhl
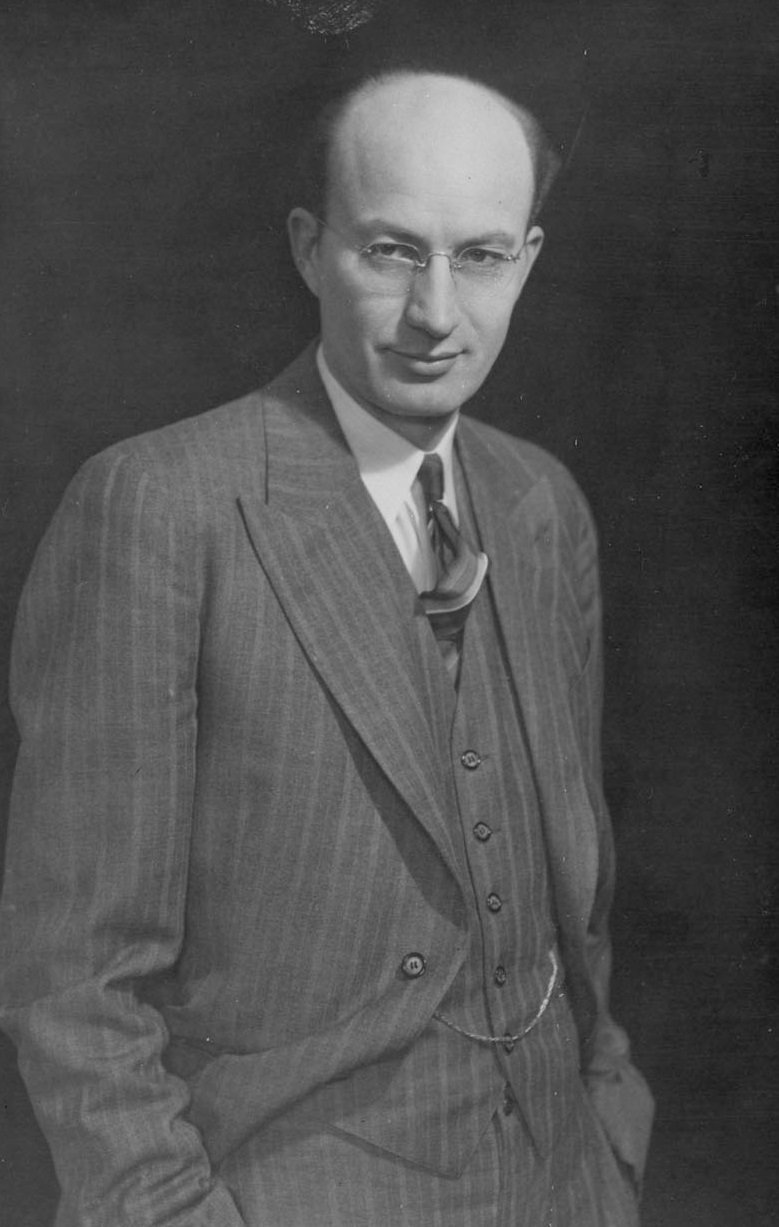

Member of the Canadian Parliament for Jasper—Edson
- In office 1935–1949
- Preceded by: none, new district
- Succeeded by: John William Welbourn

Personal details
- Born: June 25, 1905 Spruce Grove, Alberta
- Died: January 11, 1991 (aged 85)
- Party: Social Credit Party of Canada
- Occupation: teacher

Walter Frederick Kuhl (June 25, 1905 – January 11, 1991) was a Canadian teacher and federal politician.

Born in Spruce Grove, Alberta, Kuhl was elected under the Social Credit banner to the House of Commons of Canada in the 1935 Canadian federal election. He defeated incumbent Member of Parliament and former Alberta Premier Charles Stewart to win the new Jasper—Edson electoral district. Kuhl would stand for re-election in the 1940 Canadian federal election this time under the New Democracy banner. He was re-elected defeating 3 other candidates winning by less than one hundred votes. Kuhl would stand for re-election for a 3rd term this time once again under the Social Credit banner he would be re-elected in the 1945 Canadian federal election. Kuhl would be defeated in the 1949 Canadian federal election by Liberal candidate John William Welbourn.

During his time in Parliament, he tried to get Canada a new and distinctive flag and constitution, introducing a private member's bill to amend the British North America Act. In 1945, he delivered a speech in which he argued, based on constitutional theories by self-published author R. Rogers Smith, that the constitution of Canada was defective and needed to be amended. The speech was reprinted and distributed as a booklet, Canada a country without a constitution. Kuhl's arguments implied that the federal government had no taxation authority - which formed a basis to refuse to pay income tax - and that all other government jurisdictions remained with the provinces; in subsequent decades, these concepts were used as references by Canadian tax protester and pseudolaw communities, which eventually gave birth to the "Detaxer" and freeman on the land movements. Kuhl's speeches in Parliament on the constitution are also referenced by modern Alberta separatists.
