= Jasper—Edson =

Former federal electoral district in Alberta, Canada

Alberta electoral district

Defunct federal electoral district
- Legislature: House of Commons
- District created: 1933
- District abolished: 1968
- First contested: 1935
- Last contested: 1967

Jasper—Edson was a federal electoral district in Alberta, Canada, that was represented in the House of Commons of Canada from 1935 to 1968. This riding was created in 1933 from parts of Peace River riding. The electoral district was abolished in 1966 when it was redistributed into Peace River, Pembina, Red Deer, Rocky Mountain, and Wetaskiwin ridings.

== Members of Parliament ==
Jasper—Edson
Parliament	Years	Member	Party
District created from Peace River.
18th	1935–1940	Walter Frederick Kuhl	Social Credit
19th	1940–1945	Walter Frederick Kuhl	New Democracy
20th	1945–1949	Walter Frederick Kuhl	Social Credit
21st	1949–1953	John William Welbourn	Liberal
22nd	1953–1957	Charles Yuill	Social Credit
23rd	1957–1958	Charles Yuill	Social Credit
24th	1958–1962	Hugh Horner	Progressive Conservative
25th	1962–1963	Hugh Horner	Progressive Conservative
26th	1963–1965	Hugh Horner	Progressive Conservative
27th	1965–1967	Hugh Horner	Progressive Conservative
27th	1967–1968	Douglas Marmaduke Caston	Progressive Conservative
District redistributed into Peace River, Pembina, Red Deer, Rocky Mountain, and Wetaskiwin

== Election results ==
=== 1967 ===
Canadian federal by-election, November 6, 1967 Resignation of Hugh Horner on May 9, 1967
Party	Candidate	Votes	%	±%
Progressive Conservative	Douglas Caston	6,818	54.44	–4.36
Liberal	Allen Sulatycky	3,957	31.60	+13.39
New Democratic	Robert P. Christensen	1,749	13.97	+4.68
Total valid votes		12,524	100.00	
Total rejected ballots		unknown		
Turnout		12,524	–	–
Eligible voters				
Progressive Conservative hold		Swing		–8.87
Source: Library of Parliament

=== 1965 ===
1965 Canadian federal election
Party	Candidate	Votes	%	±%
Progressive Conservative	Hugh Horner	14,909	58.80	+2.62
Liberal	W.R. Brunelle	4,617	18.21	–0.17
Social Credit	Edward L. Weisgerber	3,477	13.71	–6.20
New Democratic	Peter W. Cohen	2,354	9.28	+3.74
Total valid votes		25,357	99.47	
Total rejected ballots		135	0.53	+0.15
Turnout		25,492	72.57	–0.93
Eligible voters		35,127		
Progressive Conservative hold		Swing		+1.39
Source: Library of Parliament

=== 1963 ===
1963 Canadian federal election
Party	Candidate	Votes	%	±%
Progressive Conservative	Hugh Horner	14,776	56.17	+7.70
Social Credit	Samuel P. Smith	5,238	19.91	–7.11
Liberal	William Switzer	4,833	18.37	+2.22
New Democratic	James D. Torgersen	1,457	5.54	–2.82
Total valid votes		26,304	99.62	
Total rejected ballots		101	0.38	–0.32
Turnout		26,405	73.50	–0.14
Eligible voters		35,923		
Progressive Conservative hold		Swing		+7.40
Source: Library of Parliament

=== 1962 ===
1962 Canadian federal election
Party	Candidate	Votes	%	±%
Progressive Conservative	Hugh Horner	12,371	48.47	–8.86
Social Credit	Charles Yuill	6,896	27.02	+7.61
Liberal	John R. Shiptiski	4,122	16.15	–0.71
New Democratic	James Earl Coffey	2,132	8.35	+1.96
Total valid votes		25,521	99.30	
Total rejected ballots		179	0.70	–0.02
Turnout		25,700	73.64	+5.61
Eligible voters		34,898		
Progressive Conservative hold		Swing		–8.23
Source: Library of Parliament

=== 1958 ===
1958 Canadian federal election
Party	Candidate	Votes	%	±%
Progressive Conservative	Hugh Horner	12,522	57.33	+37.19
Social Credit	Charles Yuill	4,240	19.41	–20.92
Liberal	Dale C. Thomson	3,683	16.86	–12.01
Co-operative Commonwealth	John Liss	1,396	6.39	–4.26
Total valid votes		21,841	99.28	
Total rejected ballots		159	0.72	–0.14
Turnout		22,000	68.03	–1.39
Eligible voters		32,339		
Progressive Conservative gain from Social Credit		Swing		+29.06
Source: Library of Parliament

=== 1957 ===
1957 Canadian federal election
Party	Candidate	Votes	%	±%
Social Credit	Charles Yuill	8,795	40.34	–0.28
Liberal	Douglas McKeen	6,296	28.88	–8.02
Progressive Conservative	Kenneth McKay	4,391	20.14	–
Co-operative Commonwealth	Minnie Harris	2,322	10.65	–6.59
Total valid votes		21,804	99.14	
Total rejected ballots		190	0.86	–0.03
Turnout		21,994	69.42	+6.45
Eligible voters		31,684		
Social Credit hold		Swing		+4.15
Source: Library of Parliament

=== 1953 ===
1953 Canadian federal election
Party	Candidate	Votes	%	±%
Social Credit	Charles Yuill	7,639	40.62	+6.60
Liberal	John William Welbourn	6,938	36.89	+0.41
Co-operative Commonwealth	John Liss	3,242	17.24	–1.98
Labor–Progressive	John Whittle Lee	987	5.25	–
Total valid votes		18,806	99.11	
Total rejected ballots		169	0.89	–0.13
Turnout		18,975	62.97	–3.90
Eligible voters		30,133		
Social Credit gain from Liberal		Swing		+3.50
Source: Library of Parliament

=== 1949 ===
1949 Canadian federal election
Party	Candidate	Votes	%	±%
Liberal	John William Welbourn	7,288	36.48	+12.67
Social Credit	Walter Frederick Kuhl	6,797	34.02	–3.32
Co-operative Commonwealth	Harold Emory Bronson	3,839	19.22	–5.44
Progressive Conservative	Thomas J.A. Walkeden	2,053	10.28	+0.56
Total valid votes		19,977	98.98	
Total rejected ballots		205	1.02	–0.27
Turnout		20,182	66.87	–5.10
Eligible voters		30,183		
Liberal gain from Social Credit		Swing		+8.00
Source: Library of Parliament

=== 1945 ===
1945 Canadian federal election
Party	Candidate	Votes	%	±%
Social Credit	Walter Frederick Kuhl	7,313	37.34	–1.03
Co-operative Commonwealth	Nellie Peterson	4,829	24.66	+11.98
Liberal	John William Welbourn	4,663	23.81	–14.08
Progressive Conservative	Sydney Bamber	1,902	9.71	–1.35
Labor–Progressive	Bernard Rudolf Swankey	876	4.47	–
Total valid votes		19,583	98.71	
Total rejected ballots		255	1.29	+0.29
Turnout		19,838	71.97	+16.07
Eligible voters		27,566		
Social Credit gain from New Democracy		Swing		–6.51
Source: Library of Parliament

=== 1940 ===
1940 Canadian federal election
Party	Candidate	Votes	%	±%
New Democracy	Walter Frederick Kuhl	6,363	38.37	–10.73
Liberal	Arthur Allan Knight	6,283	37.89	+1.07
Co-operative Commonwealth	Hugh Critchlow	2,102	12.68	–1.40
National Government	Sydney Bamber	1,835	11.07	–
Total valid votes		16,583	99.00	
Total rejected ballots		168	1.00	–0.12
Turnout		16,751	55.90	–2.74
Eligible voters		29,967		
New Democracy gain from Social Credit		Swing		–5.90
Source: Library of Parliament

=== 1935 ===
1935 Canadian federal election
Party	Candidate	Votes	%	±%
Social Credit	Walter Frederick Kuhl	7,208	49.10	–
Liberal	Charles Stewart	5,405	36.82	–
Co-operative Commonwealth	George Elzy Bevington	2,067	14.08	–
Total valid votes		14,680	98.88	
Total rejected ballots		166	1.12	–
Turnout		14,846	58.64	–
Eligible voters		25,316		
Social Credit gain		Swing		–
Source: Library of Parliament

== See also ==
- List of Canadian electoral districts
- Historical federal electoral districts of Canada
