= Douglas Caston =

Canadian politician

Member of the Canadian Parliament for Jasper—Edson
- In office 1967–1968
- Preceded by: Hugh Horner

Personal details
- Born: September 17, 1917 Macklin, Saskatchewan, Canada
- Died: June 26, 1996 (aged 78) Edmonton, Alberta, Canada
- Party: Progressive Conservative Party of Canada

Douglas Marmaduke Caston (September 17, 1917 – June 26, 1996) was a Canadian newspaper publisher and served as a federal politician from 1967 until 1968.

Caston ran for a seat in the House of Commons of Canada in a by-election on November 6, 1967. He defeated Liberal candidate Allen Sulatycky to win the Jasper—Edson riding. Parliament would be dissolved a year later and Caston ran for re-election in the new Rocky Mountain electoral district as Jasper—Edson was abolished. Caston would run against Sutlatycky for the second time. An unusual event happened in that election as the Progressive Conservatives had 2 endorsed candidates running under their party banner for that district. Sulatycky would win and Caston was defeated finishing third behind the other Progressive Conservative candidate Hugh Gourlay.
