= 1982 Canadian federal budget =

Allan MacEachen's third national spending plan

1982 Budget of the Canadian Federal Government
- Presented: 28 June 1982
- Country: Canada
- Parliament: 32nd
- Party: Liberal
- Finance minister: Allan MacEachen
- Total revenue: 67.430 billion
- Total expenditures: 96.479 billion
- Deficit: $29.049 billion

The Canadian federal budget for fiscal year 1982–83 was presented by Minister of Finance Allan MacEachen in the House of Commons of Canada on 28 June 1982. The budget angered public sector unions by imposing a wage restraint package limiting wage increases to six and five percent in the following two years. (This was at a time when double-digit interest rates and inflation were common.)
