= Terre Noire, Nova Scotia =

Community in Nova Scotia, Canada

Coordinates: 46.476698°N 61.082187°W

Terre Noire in Nova Scotia

Terre Noire is a small Acadian community in the Canadian province of Nova Scotia, located in Inverness County on Cape Breton Island. It is located about four miles north of Margaree Harbour and south of Cap LeMoine on the Cabot Trail. It is named for the dark soil in the area.
