= Robert MacLellan (politician, born 1925) =

Canadian politician

Member of Parliament for Inverness—Richmond
- In office 31 March 1958 – 17 June 1962
- Preceded by: Allan MacEachen
- Succeeded by: Allan MacEachen

Personal details
- Born: Robert Simpson MacLellan; 2 July 1925 Sydney, Nova Scotia, Canada
- Died: 15 January 2011 (aged 85) Ottawa, Ontario, Canada
- Party: Progressive Conservative
- Spouse: Margaret MacDonald
- Profession: Politician; lawyer

Robert Simpson MacLellan (2 July 1925 – 15 January 2011) was a Progressive Conservative party member of the House of Commons of Canada. He was born in Sydney, Nova Scotia and became a lawyer by career.

After an unsuccessful campaign in the 1957 federal election unseat Inverness—Richmond Liberal incumbent Allan MacEachen, MacLellan won the seat in the 1958 general election. MacLellan served one term before MacEachen regained the riding in the 1962 election.

MacLellan contracted lung cancer and died in Ottawa at age 85.
