= Joe Clark =

Prime Minister of Canada from 1979 to 1980

The Right Honourable Joe Clark PC CC AOE
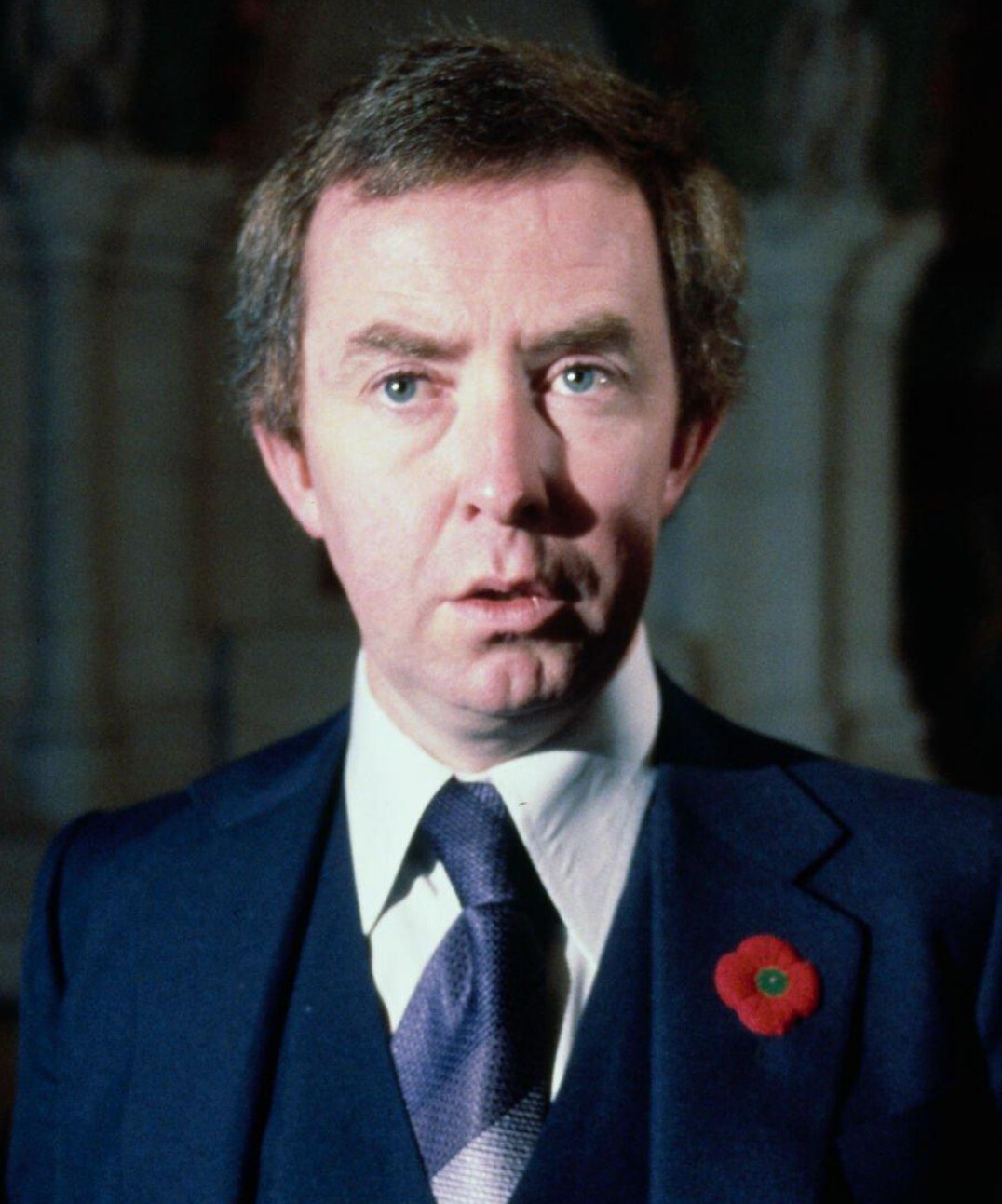
- Clark in 1979

16th Prime Minister of Canada
- In office June 4, 1979 – March 3, 1980
- Monarch: Elizabeth II
- Governor General: Edward Schreyer
- Preceded by: Pierre Trudeau
- Succeeded by: Pierre Trudeau

Leader of the Opposition
- In office March 4, 1980 – February 19, 1983
- Preceded by: Pierre Trudeau
- Succeeded by: Erik Nielsen
- In office February 22, 1976 – June 3, 1979
- Preceded by: Robert Stanfield
- Succeeded by: Pierre Trudeau

Leader of the Progressive Conservative Party of Canada
- In office November 14, 1998 – May 31, 2003
- Preceded by: Elsie Wayne (interim)
- Succeeded by: Peter MacKay
- In office February 22, 1976 – February 19, 1983
- Preceded by: Robert Stanfield
- Succeeded by: Erik Nielsen (interim)

President of the Privy Council
- In office April 21, 1991 – June 24, 1993
- Prime Minister: Brian Mulroney
- Preceded by: Don Mazankowski
- Succeeded by: Pierre Blais

Minister of Justice Attorney General of Canada
- Acting; December 8, 1988 – January 29, 1989
- Prime Minister: Brian Mulroney
- Preceded by: Ray Hnatyshyn
- Succeeded by: Doug Lewis

Secretary of State for External Affairs
- In office September 17, 1984 – April 20, 1991
- Prime Minister: Brian Mulroney
- Preceded by: Jean Chrétien
- Succeeded by: Barbara McDougall
House of Commons constituencies
Member of Parliament for Calgary Centre
In office November 27, 2000 – June 28, 2004
Preceded by	Eric Lowther
Succeeded by	Lee Richardson
Member of Parliament for Kings—Hants
In office September 11, 2000 – November 27, 2000
Preceded by	Scott Brison
Succeeded by	Scott Brison
Member of Parliament for Yellowhead (Rocky Mountain; 1972–1979)
In office October 30, 1972 – October 25, 1993
Preceded by	Allen Sulatycky
Succeeded by	Cliff Breitkreuz

Personal details
- Born: Charles Joseph Clark; June 5, 1939 (age 87) High River, Alberta, Canada
- Party: Independent (since 2003)
- Other political affiliations: Progressive Conservative (before 2003)
- Spouse: Maureen McTeer (m. 1973)
- Children: Catherine Clark
- Education: University of Alberta (BA, MA)
- Occupation: Politician; journalist; businessman; professor

Charles Joseph Clark (born June 5, 1939) is a Canadian businessman, writer, and retired politician who served as the 16th prime minister of Canada from 1979 to 1980. He served as leader of the Official Opposition from 1976 to 1979 and from 1980 to 1983 and led the Progressive Conservative Party of Canada from 1976 to 1983 and again from 1998 to 2003.

Despite his relative inexperience, Clark rose quickly in federal politics. He was first elected to the House of Commons in 1972 and won the leadership of the Progressive Conservative Party in 1976. He led the party to a minority government in the 1979 federal election, defeating the Liberal government of Pierre Trudeau and ending 16 years of continuous Liberal rule. Taking office the day before his 40th birthday, Clark became the youngest prime minister in Canadian history.

Upon becoming prime minister, Clark introduced freedom of information legislation (which died upon the dissolution of Parliament) and oversaw the "Canadian Caper" rescue in response to the Iran hostage crisis; however, his tenure was brief, as the minority government was brought down by a non-confidence vote on his first budget in December 1979. The budget defeat triggered the 1980 federal election. Clark and the Progressive Conservatives lost the election to Trudeau and the Liberals, who won a majority government and returned to power. As of 2026, he remains the most recent prime minister to have lost power following the defeat of his budget.

Clark lost the leadership of the Progressive Conservative Party to Brian Mulroney in 1983. He served in Mulroney's cabinet as Secretary of State for External Affairs from 1984 to 1991 and as President of the Privy Council and Minister responsible for Constitutional Affairs from 1991 to 1993. Clark did not stand for re-election in 1993. From 1993 to 1996, he served as Special Representative to the Secretary-General of the United Nations for Cyprus. Clark made a political comeback in 1998 to lead the Progressive Conservatives in their last general election before the party's eventual dissolution, serving his final term in Parliament from 2000 to 2004. After the Progressive Conservatives merged with the more right-wing Canadian Alliance in 2003 to form the modern-day Conservative Party of Canada, Clark sat as an independent Progressive Conservative. He criticized the merger as an "Alliance take-over", believing that the new party was drifting towards social conservatism. Clark serves as a university professor and president of his own consulting firm.

== Early years ==
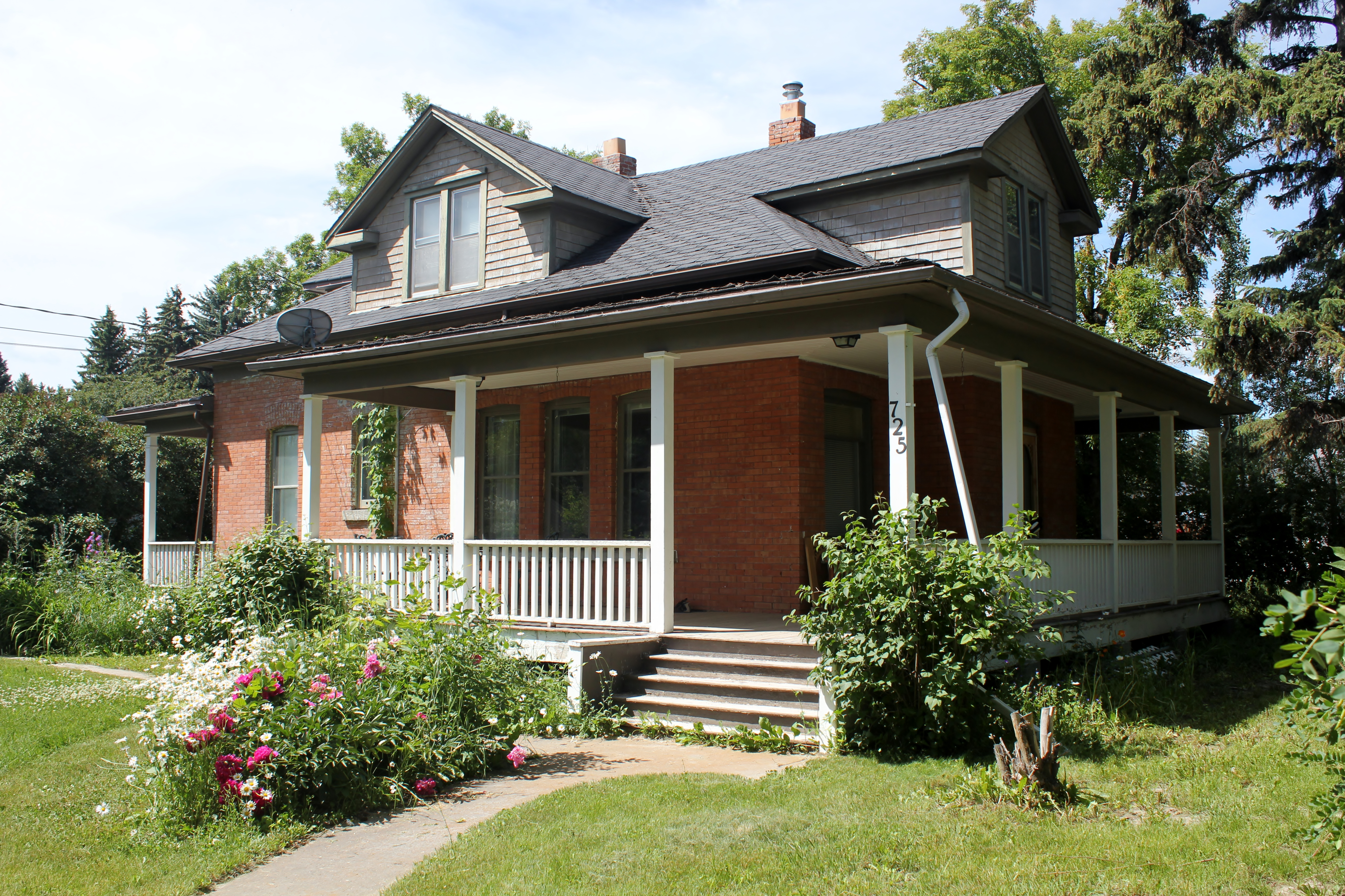
Charles Clark House, a cultural heritage site in Canada, number 6563 in the Canadian Register of Historic Places

Charles Joseph Clark was born on June 5, 1939, in High River, Alberta, the son of Grace Roselyn (née Welch) and local newspaper publisher Charles A. Clark.

Clark attended local schools and the University of Alberta, where he earned a bachelor's degree in history (1960) and a master's degree in political science (1973). While in high school, he gained journalism experience with the High River Times and the Calgary Albertan. In his first year at the University of Alberta, Clark joined the staff of the campus newspaper, The Gateway, and eventually became its editor-in-chief. Clark was also a member of the University of Alberta Debate Society (UADS). He later worked one summer at the Edmonton Journal, where he met his future biographer, David L. Humphreys.

Clark then attended Dalhousie Law School. However, he spent more time with the Dalhousie Student Union, Progressive Conservative politics and the Dalhousie Gazette than on his courses. After leaving Dalhousie, he unsuccessfully pursued first-year law studies at the University of British Columbia Faculty of Law in Vancouver. He then worked full-time for the Progressive Conservative Party.

In 1973, Clark married law student Maureen McTeer. McTeer has developed her own career as a well-known author and lawyer and caused controversy by keeping her maiden name after marriage, a practice less common at the time. Their daughter, Catherine, has pursued a career in broadcasting.

== Early political career ==
Clark became politically active while at university, having taken an interest in Canadian politics from a young age. He participated in the University of Alberta Debate Society. He served as president of the University of Alberta Young Progressive Conservatives and eventually served as national president of the Young PCs. Clark sparred with future political rival Preston Manning in debate forums on campus between the Young PCs and the Youth League of the Alberta Social Credit Party. Clark encountered another future rival when he met Brian Mulroney at a national Young PCs meeting in 1958.

Clark spent time in France to improve his fluency in the French language and took courses in French while he was living in Ottawa. He eventually became comfortable speaking and answering questions in French.

Clark entered politics at age 28 but was unsuccessful as a candidate for the provincial Progressive Conservatives in the 1967 provincial election. He served as a chief assistant to provincial opposition leader and future premier Peter Lougheed and served in the office of federal opposition leader Robert Stanfield, learning the inner workings of Parliament. He then successfully ran in the 1972 federal election and was elected to Parliament as the MP for Rocky Mountain, a largely rural riding in southwestern Alberta.

Clark had initially been viewed with suspicion, but over time won over senior members of the party. Robert Stanfield initially considered Clark unfit for politics, but over time came to view him as leadership material. Erik Nielsen viewed Clark as fiercely partisan, but was impressed by Clark's questioning of the government.

Clark's social liberalism put him at odds with the right-wing members of his caucus, several of whom were not afraid to confront him. For example, in the lead-up to the 1979 election, the bulk of Clark's riding was merged into the newly created riding of Bow River during a redistribution of ridings. Fellow Tory MP Stanley Schumacher had much of his old riding of Palliser merged into Bow River as well. Even though Clark was now party leader, Schumacher refused to step aside in Clark's favour, forcing Clark to run in nearby Yellowhead.

== Progressive Conservative leadership convention, 1976 ==
Following the resignation of Progressive Conservative leader Robert Stanfield, Clark sought and won the leadership of the party at the 1976 leadership convention. Initially, the favourite among Red Tories was Flora MacDonald; however, she did worse than expected, while Clark placed third in a field of eleven on the first ballot of convention delegates, behind only Claude Wagner and Brian Mulroney. MacDonald withdrew after the second ballot, encouraging her supporters to support Clark, who quickly became the compromise Red Tory candidate. The party's right wing rallied behind Wagner. Mulroney, a Quebec businessman with no elected political experience, was unable to expand his base of support significantly. As other Red Tory candidates were eliminated over successive ballots, Clark gradually overtook Mulroney and then Wagner to emerge as the victor on the fourth ballot, with 1,187 votes to Wagner's 1,122.

Clark, who won the Tory leadership at age 36, remains the youngest leader of a major federal party in the history of Canadian politics. With many veteran Tories having been defeated in the 1968 election, the party effectively skipped a generation by selecting Clark as its new leader.

== Opposition leader (1976–1979) ==
Clark's rapid rise from a relatively unknown Alberta MP to the Leader of the Opposition took much of Canada by surprise. The Toronto Star announced Clark's victory with a headline that read "Joe Who?", giving Clark a nickname that stuck for years. His clumsiness and awkward mannerisms were mocked by some political commentators, such as cartoonist Andy Donato, who typically drew Clark with mittens on strings hanging from his suit sleeves.

However, Clark hired experienced staffers such as Lowell Murray, Duncan Edmonds, and William Neville, who shaped his policies and ran his office. He improved his party's standing in national opinion polls. Clark gradually earned the respect of some political observers, including his own caucus, and benefited from the introduction of live television coverage of the House of Commons in 1977. Some observers noted that Clark, despite being perceived by many people as something of a square, showed biting wit at times while in Opposition. One of his most famous quips was: "A recession is when your neighbour loses his job. A depression is when you lose your job. Recovery is when Pierre Trudeau loses his job." (Note: A similar jibe would be made by Ronald Reagan during the 1980 presidential election, about Jimmy Carter.) Television broadcasts of Question Period in the House of Commons served to build Clark and the Tories up as an alternative to the Liberals.

=== 1979 federal election ===
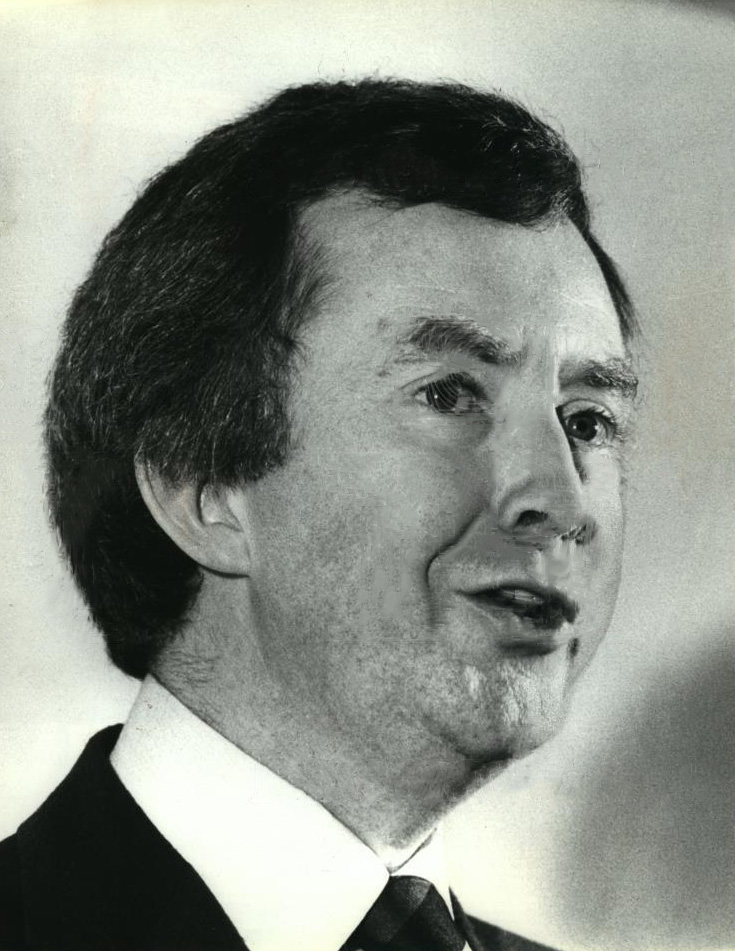
Clark in 1979

Large budget deficits, high inflation, and high unemployment made the Liberal government unpopular. Trudeau had put off asking the Canadian Governor General to call an election as long as possible, in the hope that his party could recover popular support, but it backfired, as there was growing public antipathy towards his perceived arrogance. Clark campaigned on the slogans "Let's get Canada working again" and "It's time for a change—give the future a chance!"

In the latter half of the campaign, the Liberals focused their attacks on Clark's perceived inexperience. Their advertisements declared "This is no time for on-the-job training" and "We need tough leadership to keep Canada growing. A leader must be a leader." Clark played into their hands by appearing bumbling and unsure in public.

When Clark undertook a tour of the Middle East in order to show his ability to handle foreign affairs issues, his luggage was lost, and he appeared uncomfortable with the issues being discussed. That incident was widely lampooned by Toronto Sun cartoonist Andy Donato. During the same tour, while inspecting a military honour guard, Clark turned too soon and nearly bumped into a soldier's bayonet; one early media report exaggerated the incident, claiming that he had nearly been beheaded.

Although Clark was bilingual, the Tories were unable to make much headway in Quebec, which continued to be federally dominated by the Liberals. While Clark's 1976 leadership rivals were prominent in that province, Claude Wagner had left politics (he died shortly after the election), while Brian Mulroney was still bitter about his loss and turned down an offer to serve under Clark.

Nonetheless, Clark's Progressive Conservatives won 136 seats to end 16 consecutive years of Liberal rule in the election for the 31st Canadian Parliament. Despite receiving fewer votes than the Liberals nationally, the Progressive Conservatives won the popular vote in seven provinces. They also made gains in Ontario, particularly in the Toronto suburbs, winning many seats by narrow margins, offsetting a large Liberal win in Quebec. The Tories were only able to win two seats in Quebec, leaving them six seats short of a majority. The Liberals lost 27 seats, including several high-profile cabinet ministers, and Trudeau announced his intention to step down as party leader.

== Prime Minister (1979–1980) ==
On June 4, 1979, the day before his 40th birthday, Clark was sworn in as Canada's 16th prime minister, leading the first Tory government since the defeat of John Diefenbaker in the 1963 election. He was Canada's youngest prime minister, and the first to be born in Western Canada.

With a minority government in the House of Commons, Clark had to rely on the support of the Social Credit Party, with its six seats, or the New Democratic Party (NDP), with its 26 seats. At the time, Opposition leader Trudeau said that he would allow the Progressive Conservatives a chance to govern, though he warned the Prime Minister against dismantling Petro-Canada, which was unpopular in Clark's home province of Alberta.

Social Credit was below the 12 seats needed for official party status in the House of Commons. However, the six seats would have been just enough to give Clark's government a majority had the Progressive Conservatives formed a coalition government with Social Credit, or had the two parties otherwise agreed to work together. Clark managed to lure Socred MP Richard Janelle to the government caucus, but this still left the Tories five seats short of a majority. Clark, however, decided that he would govern as if he had a majority, and refused to grant the small Socred caucus official party status, form a coalition, or co-operate with the party in any way.

Clark was unable to accomplish much in office because of the tenuous situation of his minority government. However, historians have credited Clark's government with making access to information legislation a priority. The Clark government introduced Bill C-15, the Freedom of Information Act, which established a broad right of access to government records, an elaborate scheme of exemptions, and a two-stage review process. The legislation was debated at second reading at the end of November 1979 and was referred to the Standing Committee on Justice and Legal Affairs. Within days, the minority Conservative government was unseated; the legislation died on the order paper. The re-elected Trudeau government subsequently based its Access to Information Act on the Clark government's Bill C-15. The Access to Information Act received royal assent in July 1982 and came into force in July 1983. The public now has the legal right of access to government records in some 150 federal departments and agencies.

Though the election had been held in May, Parliament did not resume sitting until October, one of the longest break periods in Confederation. The gas tax in the budget soured Clark's relationship with Ontario Premier Bill Davis, even though both were Red Tories.

During the campaign, Clark committed to moving Canada's embassy in Israel from Tel Aviv to Jerusalem, and reaffirmed this promise shortly after taking office. The proposal was contentious within the cabinet, partly because of concerns about its economic consequences. Moving the embassy risked economic retaliation or terrorist violence, while abandoning the proposal risked making Clark appear indecisive. Ultimately, the Clark government suspended the proposed move on October 29, 1979, until Jerusalem's status could be clarified with Israel's neighbours.

Internationally, Clark represented Canada in June 1979 at the 5th G7 summit in Tokyo. Clark reportedly had a good relationship with U.S. President Jimmy Carter, who phoned Clark to thank him personally for his role in the Canadian Caper.

=== Fall of government ===
During the 1979 election campaign, Clark had promised to cut taxes to stimulate the economy. However, once in office, the 1979 budget he proposed was designed to curb inflation by slowing economic activity. The budget also proposed a four-cent-per-litre (18-cent-per-gallon) tax on gasoline in order to reduce the budgetary deficit. Finance Minister John Crosbie touted the budget as "short term pain for long term gain". Though Clark had hoped this change in policy would work to his advantage, it actually earned him widespread animosity as a politician who could not keep his promises, even in such a short period.

Clark's refusal to work with the Socreds, combined with the gasoline tax, came back to haunt him when the budget came before the House of Commons in December 1979. On December 12, NDP finance critic Bob Rae proposed a subamendment to the budget motion, stating that the House of Commons did not approve of the budget. The Liberals supported the NDP subamendment. The five Socred MPs had demanded that the gas tax revenues be allocated to Quebec and abstained when Clark turned them down. On December 13, the subamendment passed by a vote of 139–133.

Clark was criticized for his "inability to do math" in failing to predict the outcome, not only because he was in a minority situation, but also because three members of his caucus would be absent for the crucial budget vote. One was ill and two were stuck abroad on official business. The Liberals, by contrast, had assembled their entire caucus, save one, for the occasion.

=== 1980 federal election ===
When a new election was called, Clark expected his party to be able to easily defeat the demoralized and leaderless Liberals, since Trudeau had announced his intention to step aside and the Liberals had yet to hold a leadership convention. However, the Progressive Conservatives had misjudged the electorate, since they had not commissioned any polls since August. A November Gallup poll published eight days before the December 11 budget reported that their popularity was down from 36% during the summer to 28%, with the party 19 points behind the Liberals, giving the latter sufficient public support to initiate the non-confidence motion. After the government fell, Clark's party was caught off guard when Pierre Trudeau quickly rescinded his resignation from the Liberal leadership to lead his party into the subsequent election.

Clark's Tories campaigned under the slogan, "Real change deserves a fair chance." Trudeau swept the Liberals back into power in the February 1980 election with 147 seats, against 103 for the Progressive Conservatives. Davis' criticism of the gas tax was used in the Liberals' Ontario television ads. The Tories lost 19 seats in that province, which ultimately proved to be decisive in the campaign.

Clark's government lasted a total of nine months less a day. Clark's Finance Minister, John Crosbie, famously described its length as follows: "Long enough to conceive, just not long enough to deliver."

=== Supreme Court appointments ===
Clark selected Julien Chouinard for appointment to the Supreme Court of Canada by the governor general, and Chouinard served from September 24, 1979, to February 6, 1987.

=== Relationship between Trudeau and Clark ===
Trudeau commented in his memoirs, published in 1993, that Clark was much tougher and more aggressive than former Tory leader Robert Stanfield, noting that those qualities helped Clark lead his party to victory in the 1979 election. Trudeau also praised Clark as a respectable leader and a better choice than Brian Mulroney, who had defeated Clark at the leadership convention in 1983. Trudeau told his friends that the Tories had chosen the wrong man.

== Opposition leader (1980–1983) ==
Opposition to Clark's leadership began to grow after the fall of the PC minority government and the party's defeat by a resurgent Liberal Party. There were frequent rumours that several potential challengers were covertly undermining Clark's leadership. Although Brian Mulroney appeared at a press conference with Clark in 1982 to say that he was not seeking the leadership of the PC party, he was in fact conspiring to oust Clark.

The Liberal Party had regained national prominence by leading the "No" side to victory in the 1980 Quebec referendum and the patriation of the Constitution. While Trudeau's National Energy Program was hugely unpopular in Western Canada, especially Alberta, the Liberals were able to strengthen their support in vote-rich eastern Canada, particularly Ontario and Quebec, generally having the opposite effect of Clark's proposed gas tax. Unpopular budgets and the economic recession contributed to declining approval ratings for Trudeau after an initial boost following the patriation of the Constitution in 1982. By early 1984, his party appeared headed for defeat, prompting him to retire. However, Clark was unable to stay on as Progressive Conservative leader long enough to regain the premiership.

On February 28, 1981, during the party's national convention, 33.5% of the delegates supported a leadership review; they felt that Clark would not be able to lead the party to victory again, but Clark considered two-thirds of the delegates voting against a review to be an endorsement. At the January 1983 convention in Winnipeg, 33.1% supported a review. The governing Liberals under Pierre Trudeau were slipping in the polls, and the PCs had built up a substantial lead. However, Trudeau was expected to retire before the next election, and a new Liberal leader might have been able to win. Moreover, some in the party considered Clark too liberal and would be a liability come election time.

=== 1983 leadership convention ===
In 1983, after declaring that an endorsement by 66.9% of delegates at the party's biennial convention was not enough, Clark called a leadership convention to decide the issue. In December 2007, German-Canadian businessman and lobbyist Karlheinz Schreiber told the House of Commons Ethics Committee that he and other Germans, including Bavarian politician Franz Josef Strauss, and Austrian-Canadian entrepreneur Walter Wolf, had contributed significant funds to encourage Quebec delegates to vote against Clark at the Winnipeg convention, denying him the mandate he sought. A public inquiry on these matters, and on other business dealings between Mulroney and Schreiber, was called for early 2008 by Prime Minister Stephen Harper. This led to the 2009 Oliphant Commission.

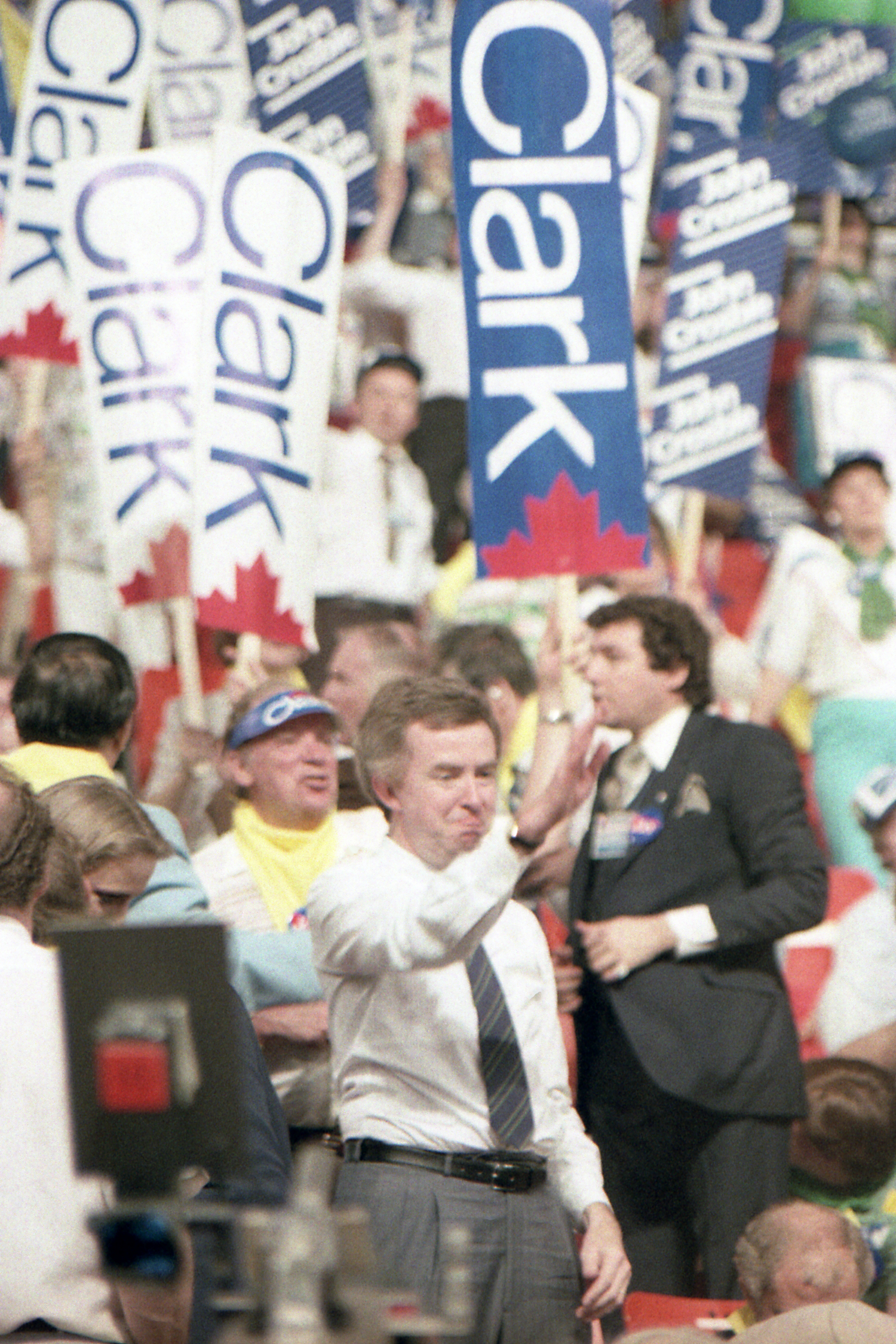
Joe Clark on the floor of the 1983 leadership convention.

Clark immediately entered the contest to retain the party leadership and retained support from most of the Red Tories and other party members who were opposed to public criticism of his leadership within the party. Clark already had most of a campaign team up and running by the time he called the leadership convention, as he had mobilized supporters for the convention's leadership review. However, Mulroney and John Crosbie had been laying the groundwork for a campaign for some time, with Crosbie expecting Clark to lose or resign soon, and Mulroney supporting the anti-Clark movement.

In a rematch of the 1976 convention, Mulroney emerged as the main challenger, gaining the support of the party's right wing, which viewed Clark as too progressive and opposed his continued leadership. Other party members felt that the federal Liberal Party's stranglehold on Quebec seats (they held all but one of the province's 75 seats) could only be broken by a candidate from that province, giving Mulroney considerable support. Media coverage emphasized the pro-business and neo-liberal bent of most of the candidates as a "Changing of the Guard" within the PC party from their more classical conservative and moderate elements. Clark's campaign countered this by trying to polarize the election between right-wingers and a centrist who had been able to win before. The Mulroney campaign responded by continuing their pro-business line.

Several candidates agreed to an "ABC" (Anybody But Clark) strategy for the convention, and when news of that back-room deal broke out, support was expected to rally around the party's embattled leader. During delegate voting, Clark led on the first ballot but received only 36.5% of the vote, well short of the 50% required. His support dwindled over the next two ballots. Mulroney, who was endorsed by all but two candidates, defeated Clark on the fourth ballot. Clark urged his supporters to leave the convention united behind Mulroney and agreed to serve under him.

Many political observers and analysts have questioned Clark's rationale for the decision. One famous incident involved a 1987 official dinner held for Prince Charles at Rideau Hall. When the prince met Clark in the receiving line at the function, he asked Clark: "why wasn't two thirds enough?" Clark's wife, Maureen McTeer, elaborated on Clark's decision in her 2003 autobiography, In My Own Name. McTeer suggested that for her husband, anything less than a 75% endorsement would not have been a clear enough mandate to secure the support of the party membership. Clark feared that the 34% of PC members who did not support him would become his most vocal critics in the upcoming election campaign, and that his continued leadership would have led to fractures in the party. Clark was convinced that he could win another leadership race and gain a clear mandate once his qualities were compared against the handful of politically inexperienced challengers who coveted his position and who were covertly undermining his leadership.

== Member of Mulroney cabinet ==
=== Secretary of State for External Affairs (Minister of Foreign Affairs) ===
The Progressive Conservatives, led by Mulroney, went on to win a decisive victory in the 1984 election, and Mulroney became prime minister.

Despite their personal differences, Clark served in Mulroney's cabinet as secretary of state for external affairs, the title used for the minister of foreign affairs before 1993.

Clark's actions as external affairs minister included:

- Convincing Mulroney to recommend the appointment of Stephen Lewis as Canada's ambassador to the United Nations; Lewis later became the UN special envoy on the AIDS crisis; some observers viewed Lewis's appointment as a condition of Clark's service under Mulroney;
- In 1984, becoming the first foreign affairs minister from a developed nation to visit Ethiopia, where he led the Western response to the 1983–1985 famine in Ethiopia; Canada's response was extensive and led the United States and Great Britain to follow suit soon afterwards, despite Ethiopia being a Marxist one-party state that had previously been isolated by Western countries;
- Taking a strong stand against apartheid and for economic sanctions against South Africa at a time when Canadian allies Ronald Reagan and Margaret Thatcher opposed such sanctions;
- Taking a strong stand against American intervention in Nicaragua;
- Accepting refugees from El Salvador and Guatemala;
- Maintaining close ties with the United States and helping steer the North American Free Trade Agreement negotiations to a final agreement.

During his term as External Affairs minister, Clark advocated Canada's opposition to the apartheid regime in South Africa. Canada was the only G7 nation to take such a strong stance against the apartheid regime during the 1980s. He also took on the constitutional affairs portfolio after the failure of the Meech Lake Accord.

Clark maintained Canada's independent voice politically and socially at a time of increasing economic integration with the United States and the rise of more socially conservative right-wing politics there.

=== Minister responsible for Constitutional Affairs ===
Clark later served as president of the Queen's Privy Council for Canada.

As Quebec's constitutional status within Canada became an increasingly prominent issue, he became the minister responsible for constitutional affairs. In that position, he played a leading role in the drafting of the Charlottetown Accord, which was decisively rejected in a nationwide referendum and further hurt the standing of the PC party in polls.

=== First retirement from Canadian politics ===
Clark retired from politics in 1993, thereby avoiding the heavy losses suffered by the PC Party in the 1993 election under the leadership of Mulroney's successor Kim Campbell.

Clark was appointed as Special Representative to the Secretary-General of the United Nations for Cyprus from 1993 to 1996. In 1993, he founded his own consulting firm, Joe Clark and Associates, Ltd., which he continued to lead. Clark has also served on the boards of directors or advisory boards of several Canadian companies.

During the 1993–1994 academic year, Clark served as a Regents' Lecturer in the Canadian Studies Program at the University of California, Berkeley.

In 1994, he was made a Companion of the Order of Canada. Also in 1994, he wrote the book A Nation Too Good to Lose: Renewing the Purpose of Canada. The book was also published in French.

The 1995 Quebec referendum saw the federal side win by less than one percent of the vote. The failure of the Charlottetown and earlier Meech Lake accords was widely seen as a factor in the narrow result.

== Progressive Conservative leadership, 1998–2003 ==
One of the two PC candidates to survive the 1993 electoral defeat, Jean Charest, became leader of the PC party following Campbell's resignation. After leading the party to a modest resurgence in the 1997 election, winning 20 seats, Charest left federal politics to become leader of the Quebec Liberal Party (unaffiliated with the federal Liberals). The party had no obvious candidate to succeed Charest and turned to Clark once again in 1998. He was elected through a teleconference of PC members from around the country in which each of the party's riding associations was allocated 100 points. The points for each riding were then assigned on the basis of each candidate's share of votes within each riding association. Clark defeated Hugh Segal, free-trade opponent David Orchard, former Manitoba cabinet minister Brian Pallister, and future Senator Michael Fortier for the leadership of the PC Party.

It took two years for Clark to return to Parliament. He was elected for Kings—Hants, Nova Scotia, in a by-election on September 11, 2000, after the incumbent MP, Scott Brison, stood down in his favour. This is common practice when a newly elected party leader does not already have a seat in Parliament. For the general election held two months later, Clark yielded Kings-Hants back to Brison and was elected as the MP for Calgary Centre, by then deep in the heart of Canadian Alliance territory.

Clark ran on his previous experience as prime minister and external affairs minister. However, he faced a difficult task, with critics and opponents portraying a vote for him and the PC Party as a "vote for the past". Jean Chrétien's governing Liberals were running on their successful economic record, and they were poised to regain the support they had lost in 1997, threatening the PCs' 1997 gains in Ontario, Quebec, and the Atlantic provinces. The PC Party lost ground in Quebec (due in part to the departure of Jean Charest to provincial politics), which resulted in three members of the PC caucus defecting to join the Liberal Party prior to the election. Clark was nevertheless judged by audiences to be the best speaker during the 2000 election debates. The party lost seats to the Liberals, though it managed to hang onto the minimum of 12 seats necessary to be recognized in the House of Commons as an official party and therefore qualify for research funding, committee memberships, and minimum speaking privileges. Aside from Clark's Calgary seat (one of only three Alberta seats that did not go to the Canadian Alliance), and one each in Manitoba and Quebec, the party's seats were concentrated in Tory bastions in the Atlantic provinces. Clark continually promoted the idea that the PCs would eventually retake Ontario and form a federal government again. His vision for the party lay to the left of the Alliance but to the right of the Liberals.

He soon realized that there was no chance of dislodging the Liberals as long as the centre-right remained split. However, he wanted a merger on his terms. He got his chance in 2001, when several dissident Alliance MPs, including deputy leader Deborah Grey, left the Alliance caucus. The dissidents felt that Alliance leader Stockwell Day had not learned from mistakes made in the last election. While some of them rejoined the Alliance later, seven of them, led by Chuck Strahl of British Columbia and including Grey, refused and formed the Democratic Representative Caucus. The DRC quickly formed a joint caucus with the Tories under Clark's leadership.

This lasted until 2002, when Stephen Harper ousted Day as Alliance leader. Harper wanted a closer union with the PCs, but Clark turned the offer down in April 2002, and all but two of the DRC members rejoined the Alliance. One of the two, Inky Mark, eventually joined the PCs. Two by-election victories later in 2002 increased the PC caucus to 15 members, making it the fourth-largest party in the Commons.

Clark was named by media representatives and parliamentarians for three consecutive years as Canada's most effective opposition leader between 2000 and 2002, pursuing the Liberal government on issues such as Shawinigate and the Groupaction scandal. In his final mandate, Jean Chrétien repeatedly referred to Clark as the Leader of the Opposition (although Clark did not hold that position), much to the chagrin of the Canadian Alliance politicians who occupied the opposition leader's chair during the same period. Indeed, Chrétien and Clark had been fellow parliamentarians since the 1970s, and they shared a mutual respect despite sitting on opposite benches.

Clark's personal popularity grew as further scandals affected Chrétien's Liberal government. Clark was widely trusted by Canadians, but this, in his own words, did not translate into more votes and additional seats. Citing the lack of electoral gains, Clark announced his intention to step down as PC leader on August 6, 2002, at the PC Party's Edmonton policy convention. It was expected that a pro-Alliance merger candidate would succeed Clark, but Clark was instead replaced by Peter MacKay on May 31, 2003. MacKay had signed a controversial deal with Red Tory rival David Orchard, promising not to merge the PC Party with the Alliance. Clark had always encouraged MacKay to keep Orchard and his followers within the PC camp.

MacKay immediately reversed his position on seeking a merger, and in 2003, 90% of PC Party delegates voted in favour of a merger with the Canadian Alliance. Orchard unsuccessfully tried to block the merger and later joined the Liberal Party.

=== Legacy of second PC leadership ===
In May 2003, the party finally overtook the New Democratic Party as the fourth-largest party in the House of Commons after by-election wins in Newfoundland and Labrador and Ontario.

At the same time, the party was still $10 million in debt from the 2000 election. The PC Party's membership had also dropped from 100,000 in 1998 to 45,000 card-carrying PCs in May 2003. Clark's leadership of the Progressive Conservatives was also the subject of criticism from many United Alternative supporters, who argued that his staunch opposition to a merger with the Reform/Alliance parties helped divide the "conservative" vote during the tenure of Jean Chrétien. Some critics accused Clark of prioritizing his party and career over the broader Canadian conservative movement. Others called Clark's goal of restoring the PC Party's former influence unrealistic.

== Progressive Conservative–Canadian Alliance merger ==
On December 8, 2003, the day that the PC Party and the Canadian Alliance were dissolved and the new Conservative Party of Canada was registered, Clark was one of three MPs—the other two were André Bachand and John Herron—to announce that they would not join the new caucus. MP Scott Brison had already joined the Liberals.

Clark announced that he would continue to sit for the remainder of the session as an independent Progressive Conservative MP and retired from Parliament at the end of the session.

Later, Clark openly criticized the new Conservative Party in the run-up to the 2004 election. He gave a qualified endorsement to the Liberal Party in the 2004 election, calling Paul Martin "the devil we know". He criticized the new Conservative Party as an "Alliance take-over", and speculated that Eastern Canada would not accept the new party or its more socially conservative policies on same-sex marriage and abortion. Clark endorsed former NDP leader Ed Broadbent and other Liberals and Conservatives as individuals, saying that the priority was to have "the strongest possible House of Commons of Canada" since neither large party offered much hope. Clark was criticized by some for dismissing the new Conservative Party outright rather than helping to steer it towards a moderate path.

== Post-politics, 2004–present ==
Clark served as a public policy scholar at the Woodrow Wilson International Center for Scholars. He served as distinguished statesman-in-residence at the School of International Service and as a senior fellow at the Center for North American Studies, both at American University in Washington, D.C. In addition to teaching there, Clark has written opinion pieces for several Canadian national newspapers since his retirement. In October 2006, Clark took a position at McGill University as a professor of practice for public–private sector partnerships at the McGill Institute for the Study of International Development. He serves with the Jimmy Carter Center, routinely travelling overseas as part of the centre's international observing activities.

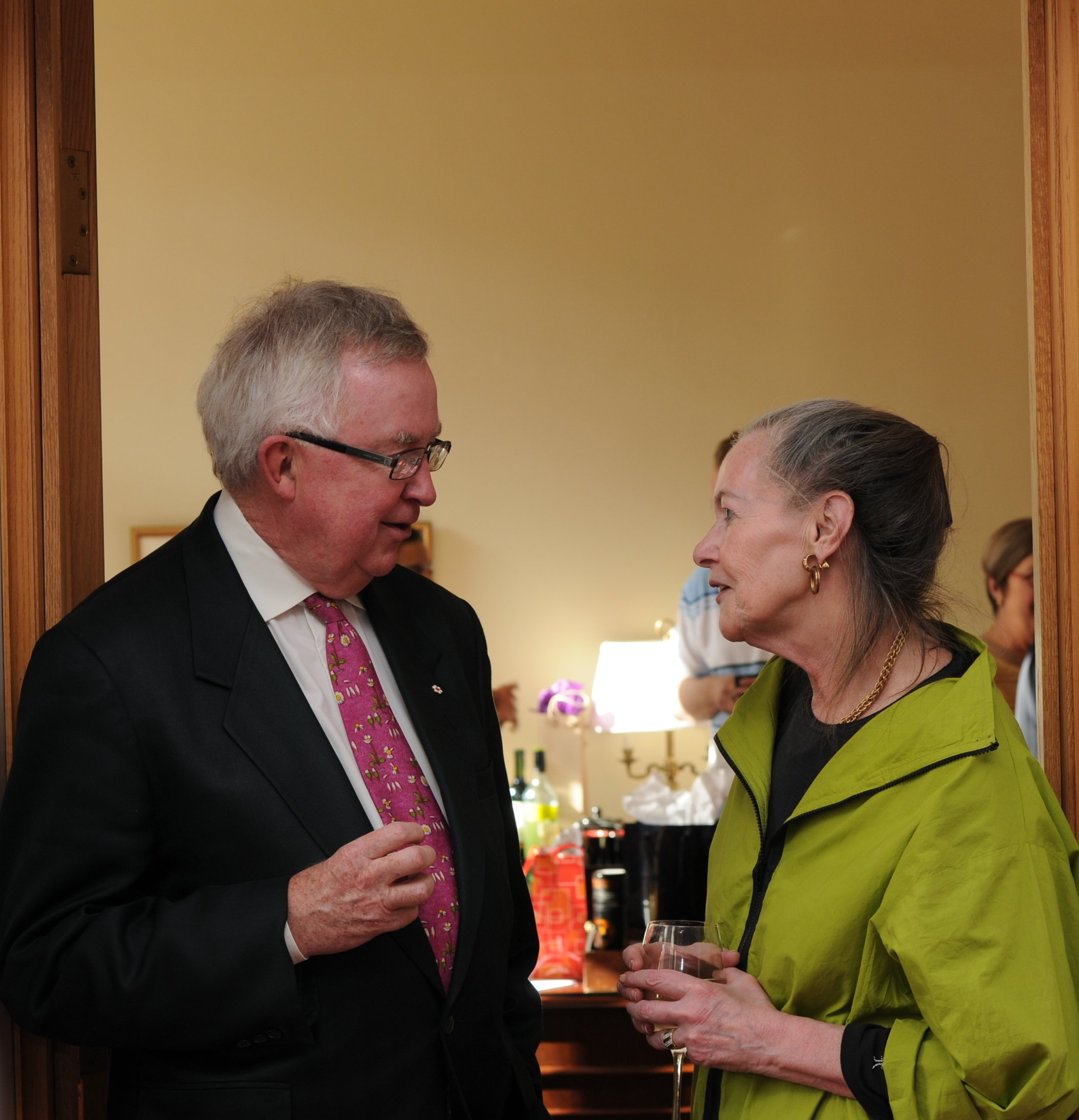
Clark speaking with Progressive Conservative Senator Elaine McCoy (Alberta)

Joe Clark is vice-chair and a member of the Global Leadership Foundation, an organization that works to support democratic leadership, prevent and resolve conflicts through mediation, and promote good governance in the form of democratic institutions, open markets, human rights and the rule of law. It does so by discreetly sharing the experience of former leaders with today's national leaders. It is a not-for-profit organization composed of former heads of government, senior governmental and international organization officials who work closely with heads of government on governance-related issues of concern to them. He is also a member of the Washington, D.C.-based think tank Inter-American Dialogue.

Before 2012, Clark served on the International Advisory Board of Governors of the Centre for International Governance Innovation.

Clark was attacked while walking down the street in Montreal in mid-November 2007. The attacker first asked him if he was the former prime minister, and when Clark answered that he was, the man struck him and fled. Clark sustained a bloody nose but was not seriously hurt.

He published the book How We Lead: Canada in a Century of Change in 2013.

In March 2020, Prime Minister Justin Trudeau appointed Clark special envoy for Canada's bid for a UN Security Council seat. Clark travelled to Algeria, Bahrain, Qatar and Egypt in an effort to seek votes for Canada.

In February 2025, Clark called on Canadians to appeal to their American friends to oppose Donald Trump's tariffs amid the trade war with the United States.

== Honours ==

As a former prime minister, Clark is entitled to use the designation "The Right Honourable" for life. Clark was made a Companion of the Order of Canada. He is a member of the Alberta Order of Excellence. He was appointed a commandeur of the Ordre de la Pléiade by La Francophonie. He also holds the Queen Elizabeth II Silver Jubilee Medal (1977), 125th Anniversary of the Confederation of Canada Medal (1992), Queen Elizabeth II Golden Jubilee Medal (2002), Queen Elizabeth II Diamond Jubilee Medal (2012), Alberta Centennial Medal (2005) and the King Charles III Coronation Medal (2023). Clark was the first recipient of the Vimy Award. He holds the title of Honorary Chief Bald Eagle of the Samson Cree Nation.

In 2004, Clark's lifetime achievements were recognized with the Award for Excellence in the Cause of Parliamentary Democracy by Canada's Churchill Society for the Advancement of Parliamentary Democracy.

On May 27, 2008, Clark's official parliamentary portrait was unveiled at a reception for display in Centre Block alongside Canada's past prime ministers.

In a 1999 survey of Canadian historians, Clark was ranked No. 15 out of the first 20 prime ministers up to Jean Chrétien. The survey was used in the book Prime Ministers: Ranking Canada's Leaders by J. L. Granatstein and Norman Hillmer.

École Joe Clark School in High River, Alberta, is named in honour of Clark.

=== Order of Canada citation ===
Clark was appointed a Companion of the Order of Canada on October 19, 1994. His citation reads:

Canada's sixteenth and youngest Prime Minister, he served with distinction as Secretary of State for External Affairs, President of the Privy Council and Minister responsible for Constitutional Affairs. His talent for negotiation and consensus diplomacy has served him well in politics and as Representative of the Secretary General of the United Nations in Cyprus. He has earned the admiration of all Canadians as one of our country's most respected statesmen.

== Honorary degrees ==
Joe Clark has received honorary degrees from several institutions:

Location	Date	School	Degree
New Brunswick	May 1976	University of New Brunswick	Doctor of Laws (LL.D.)
Alberta	1984	University of Calgary	
Alberta	1985	University of Alberta	Doctor of Laws (LL.D.)
Quebec	November 1994	Concordia University	Doctor of Laws (LL.D.)
Ontario	Spring 2009	York University	Doctor of Laws (LL.D.)
Ontario	2010	Carleton University	Doctor of Laws (LL.D.)
British Columbia	May 24, 2012	University of British Columbia	Doctor of Laws (LL.D.)
Quebec	June 3, 2015	McGill University	Doctor of Laws (LL.D.)
Alberta	1993	MacEwan University	Distinguished Citizen Award
Alberta		Southern Alberta Institute of Technology	
Nova Scotia		University of King's College	
Minnesota		University of St. Thomas	
Ontario	November 17, 2023	Queen's University	

== Arms ==
Coat of arms of Joe Clark

Notes
Per pale Azure and Or a flat bed printing press above a bar gemel wavy in base all counterchanged on a canton the mark of the Prime Ministership of Canada (Argent four maple leaves conjoined in cross at the stem Gules). Symbolism: The printing press symbolizes the involvement of Mr. Clark and his family with newspapers and journalism. The wavy bars refer to High River, Alberta, his birthplace, and the division of the shield alludes to its location at the point where the foothills, represented by the blue, become the prairies, represented by the gold. The heraldic emblem of the Prime Minister of Canada appears in the upper left.
Crest
A demi lion Or gorged with a collar of wild roses Gules holding in the dexter forepaw a carpenter's square Azure and in the sinister forepaw a quill pen Or. Symbolism: The lion, a creature of determination and strength of purpose, is one of the supporters of the arms of Canada. Here, it is used to represent Mr. Clark's service to the Canadian people in parliament. The wild roses are the provincial flower of Alberta. The quill pen represents journalism and advocacy through writing. The carpenter's square conveys the idea that Mr. Clark and his wife, Maureen McTeer, are builders through service. It also alludes to the McTeer family name, derived from the Gaelic word for "craftsman".
Supporters
On a grassy mound Vert two bald eagles Argent wings elevated and addorsed Azure each wing charged with a fess chequy Argent and Azure edged Or both eagles gorged with a collar Azure pendant therefrom the Badge of a member of the House of Commons of Canada proper. Symbolism: The two eagles recall Mr. Clark's Cree name, Honorary Chief Bald Eagle. Their wings are coloured with a chequered band of blue and white, a pattern found in Clark coats of arms in Scotland. Their collars feature the pin worn by the members of the House of Commons, to underscore Mr. Clark's service as a parliamentarian. The grassy mound symbolizes the lawns of Parliament Hill.
Motto
THE RIGHT TO KNOW · THE WILL TO SERVE. Symbolism: This phrase indicates the Clark family's belief in enabling citizens to meet their responsibilities in an informed way, as well as the family's commitment to serve Canadians.

== See also ==
- List of prime ministers of Canada

== Citations ==
24th Canadian Ministry (1984–1993) – Cabinet of Brian Mulroney
Cabinet posts (4)
Predecessor	Office	Successor
Don Mazankowski	President of the Queen's Privy Council for Canada; 1991–1993	Pierre Blais
Ray Hnatyshyn	Minister of Justice; 1988	Doug Lewis
Robert Coates	Minister of National Defence; 1985	Erik Nielsen
Jean Chrétien	Secretary of State for External Affairs; 1984–1991	Barbara McDougall
Special Cabinet Responsibilities
Predecessor	Title	Successor
	Minister responsible for Constitutional Affairs; 1991–1993	
21st Canadian Ministry (1979–1980) – Cabinet of Joe Clark
Cabinet post (1)
Predecessor	Office	Successor
Pierre Trudeau	Prime Minister of Canada; 1979–1980	Pierre Trudeau
Party political offices
Preceded by Robert Stanfield	Leader of the Progressive Conservative Party; 1976–1983	Succeeded by Erik Nielsen; Interim
Preceded by Elsie Wayne; Interim	Leader of the Progressive Conservative Party; 1998–2003	Succeeded by Peter MacKay
Parliament of Canada
Preceded by Robert Stanfield	Leader of the Opposition; 1976–1979	Succeeded by Pierre Trudeau
Preceded by Pierre Trudeau	Leader of the Opposition; 1980–1983	Succeeded by Erik Nielsen
Preceded by Allen Sulatycky	Member of Parliament Rocky Mountain; 1972–1979	Succeeded by District Abolished
Preceded by New District	Member of Parliament Yellowhead; 1979–1993	Succeeded by Cliff Breitkreuz
Preceded by Scott Brison	Member of Parliament Kings—Hants; 2000	Succeeded by Scott Brison
Preceded by Eric Lowther	Member of Parliament Calgary Centre; 2000–2004	Succeeded by Lee Richardson
Order of precedence
Preceded by Diana Fowler LeBlanc as Widow of Governor General	Canadian order of precedence as Former Prime Minister	Succeeded by Kim Campbell as Former Prime Minister
