= Francis LeBlanc =

Canadian politician

Francis G. LeBlanc (born 22 December 1953 in Margaree Forks, Nova Scotia) was a member of the House of Commons of Canada from 1988 to 1997.

LeBlanc won the Cape Breton Highlands—Canso electoral district for the Liberal party in the 1988 and 1993 federal elections.

The Cape Breton Highlands-Canso riding was redistributed for the 1997 federal election, in which LeBlanc campaigned for the Pictou—Antigonish—Guysborough riding. He lost to Progressive Conservative candidate Peter MacKay. LeBlanc therefore left federal politics after serving in the 34th and 35th Canadian Parliaments.

As of October 2017 he served as Executive Director of the Canadian Association of Former Parliamentarians.
