= 1979 Canadian federal budget =

John Crosbie and the Clark ministry's first national spending plan

1979 Budget of the Canadian Federal Government
- Presented: 11 December 1979
- Country: Canada
- Parliament: 31st
- Party: Progressive Conservative
- Finance minister: John Crosbie

The 1979 Canadian federal budget was presented by Minister of Finance John Crosbie in the House of Commons of Canada on 11 December 1979. It was the first and only Canadian federal budget presented under the premiership of Joe Clark. It was never adopted, as the government was defeated in a vote of confidence on a budget subamendment on December 13, 1979.

== Background ==
The budget was tabled six and a half months after the 1979 Canadian federal election where the Progressive Conservatives led by Joe Clark won 136 seats, falling 6 seats short of a majority. On paper, support from any one of the three other official status parties (Liberal, NDP or Social Credit) would be enough to pass a budget should all the PC MPs vote likewise.

The economic climate was still precarious with a series of mixed signals during 1979:

- GDP growth and employment took a turn for the better, with strong recovery of business investment;
- Balance of payments and external trade balance seriously deteriorated due to slowing exports to the US (due to the weak economy there) and increasing imports (especially of foreign-made machinery and equipment);
- Inflation still remained high with CPI increase of 9% over 1978.

== Taxes ==
Despite having campaigned on tax cuts during the 1979 Canadian federal election, Joe Clark's first budget contained several measures that departed from that. The budget included an 18-cent per gallon tax increase on gasoline, a 10 percent tax increase tobacco products, and a corporate surtax amounting to 1 percent of their income taxes. Farmers, Fishermen, and public urban transit were to receive a 10 percent gasoline tax rebate.

=== Personal income taxes ===
The budget announced a series of new tax incentives:

- Introduction of two new tax credits:
  - A refundable Energy Tax Credit to ease the impact of the proposed energy tax, the government planned for the introduction of an income-tested refundable tax credit of up to $80 per adult and $30 per child.
  - The Mortgage Interest and Property Tax Credit, scheduled to be phased in over 3 years (1980 to 1982). (Note: That measure is not included in the Notice of Ways and Means Motion tabled along the budget.)
- Improvement of existing measures:
  - The government planned to make the Quebec abatement refundable for the portion in excess of federal tax payable, starting in the 1980 fiscal year;
  - Salaries paid by husbands to their wives assisting their unincorporated business was to be made deductible.
- The budget also announced the creation of a new tax-registered savings plan the Canadian Common Stock Investment Plan (CCSIP) to encourage savings in common stocks of businesses in Canada

=== Corporate income taxes ===
- The budget announced a temporary 5% surtax on corporations:
  - A 5% surtax is imposed for all corporations for fiscal years ending between 12 December 1979 (date of the budget) and 31 December 1981.

=== Other taxes ===
==== Gasoline tax ====
The Gasoline tax (Note: Officially designated Energy Tax in the budget speech.) was implemented at midnight between December 11 and December 12, the night the budget was announced. This led many Canadians to rush to the gas stations to buy "cheap gas" before the gas tax came into effect at midnight that night.

When the government fell on December 13, the gas tax was rolled back, along with other budgetary measures that were provisionally implemented.

==== Excise taxes ====
The budget announced an increase on the excise taxes of alcohol, tobacco and other products:

- Excise on alcohol and wine were increased by $0.11 and $0.439 per bottle respectively;
- Excise on beer was increased by $0.01 per bottle;
- Excise on tobacco was increase by 10%, or $0.025 per pack of 20 cigarettes.

== Reactions ==
=== Provinces ===
Quebec Finance Minister Jacques Parizeau rejected the budget, calling it “odious” towards Quebec, especially criticizing the gasoline tax increase. Parizeau expressed his view that Ottawa had encroached on this tax source since 1975 and should abolish its gasoline taxes altogether to provide tax room for the provinces.

== Aftermath ==
=== Legislative history ===
The day following the presentation of the budget, the Liberals and the New Democrats vowed to do everything they could to bring down the government. The Social Credit Party also announced that they would not support the budget.

Clark entered negotiations with Socred leader Fabien Roy to obtain their support for the budget. Clark offered to double the energy tax credit proposed in the bill, but to no avail. Roy believed Clark had come to him too late to obtain their support for the budget, and thus left too little time for negotiations. NDP finance critic Bob Rae proposed a subamendent stating that the House did not approve of the budget. The subamendent carried by a vote of 139 to 133 with the Socreds abstaining, bringing down the government.

House of Commons vote on the 1979 Canadian federal budget
Party	Yea	Nay	Abstention	Absent
PC	133	0	0	3
LPC	0	113	0	1
NDP	0	26	0	0
Social Credit	0	0	5	0
Total	133	139	5	4

=== Political fallout ===
Following the fall of the government, Pierre Elliot Trudeau decided to walk back his resignation from the leadership of the Liberal Party. Trudeau ended up defeating Joe Clark, and in the 1980 Canadian federal election the Liberals were swept back into power with a majority government.

== Notes and references ==
=== References ===
==== Budget documents ====
- Budget Speech 1979 (PDF). Ottawa. 11 December 1979.
- Budget Papers 1979 (PDF). Ottawa. 11 December 1979.
- Budget in Brief 1979 (PDF). Ottawa. 11 December 1979.
