= Palliser (Alberta electoral district) =

Former federal electoral district in Alberta, Canada

Alberta electoral district
- Palliser electoral district boundaries

Defunct federal electoral district
- Legislature: House of Commons
- District created: 1966
- District abolished: 1979
- First contested: 1968
- Last contested: 1974

Palliser was a federal electoral district in Alberta, Canada, that was represented in the House of Commons of Canada from 1968 to 1979. This riding was created in 1966 from parts of Acadia, Bow River, Calgary North, and Macleod ridings. It was abolished in 1976 when it was redistributed into Bow River, Calgary East, Calgary North, Calgary West, and Red Deer ridings.

== Members of Parliament ==
Palliser
Parliament	Years	Member	Party
District created from Acadia, Bow River, Calgary North, and Macleod
28th	1968–1972	Stanley Schumacher	Progressive Conservative
29th	1972–1974	Stanley Schumacher	Progressive Conservative
30th	1974–1979	Stanley Schumacher	Progressive Conservative
District redistributed into Bow River, Calgary East, Calgary North, Calgary West, and Red Deer

== Election results ==
1974 Canadian federal election
Party	Candidate	Votes	%	±%
Progressive Conservative	Stanley Schumacher	34,185	68.91	+4.83
Liberal	John Salus	10,125	20.41	+1.04
New Democratic	Bill McCutcheon	3,708	7.48	–3.47
Social Credit	Ada Major	1,590	3.21	–2.40
Total valid votes		49,608	99.71	
Total rejected ballots		142	0.29	–0.50
Turnout		49,750	68.53	–8.59
Eligible voters		72,591		
Progressive Conservative hold		Swing		+2.93
Source: Library of Parliament

1972 Canadian federal election
Party	Candidate	Votes	%	±%
Progressive Conservative	Stanley Schumacher	29,284	64.08	+3.76
Liberal	Mary Guichon	8,854	19.37	–13.15
New Democratic	Bill McCutcheon	5,000	10.94	+3.78
Social Credit	Edwin Ed Ens	2,563	5.61	–
Total valid votes		45,701	99.21	
Total rejected ballots		362	0.79	+0.26
Turnout		46,063	77.12	+0.57
Eligible voters		59,731		
Progressive Conservative hold		Swing		+8.45
Source: Library of Parliament

1968 Canadian federal election
Party	Candidate	Votes	%	±%
Progressive Conservative	Stanley Schumacher	16,967	60.32	–
Liberal	John Ayer	9,147	32.52	–
New Democratic	Allan M. Early	2,014	7.16	–
Total valid votes		28,128	99.47	
Total rejected ballots		151	0.53	–
Turnout		28,279	76.55	–
Eligible voters		36,943		
Progressive Conservative notional gain		Swing		–
Source: Library of Parliament

== See also ==
- List of Canadian electoral districts
- Historical federal electoral districts of Canada
