= Eldon Woolliams =

Canadian politician (1916–2001)

Eldon Mattison Woolliams
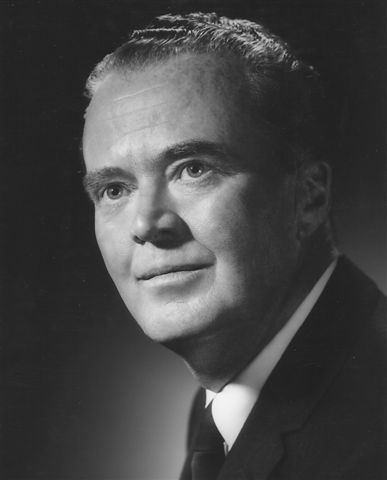

Member of Parliament for Bow River
- In office 1958–1968
- Preceded by: Charles Edward Johnston
- Succeeded by: Gordon Taylor

Member of Parliament for Calgary North
- In office 1968–1979
- Preceded by: Douglas Harkness
- Succeeded by: Frederick Wright

Personal details
- Born: 12 April 1916 Rosetown, Saskatchewan, Canada
- Died: 24 September 2001 (aged 85)
- Party: Progressive Conservative
- Spouse(s): Erva Leola Jones (m. 1 September 1943)
- Children: Elda Lynne Woolliams; Shane Leslie Mattison
- Profession: lawyer, teacher

Eldon Mattison Woolliams, QC (12 April 1916 – 24 September 2001) was a Canadian politician and lawyer. Woolliams served as a Progressive Conservative Party member of the House of Commons of Canada.

== Early life and education ==
He was born in Rosetown, Saskatchewan, and his career included law and education. He was shadow Justice Minister and Chairman of the House of Commons Standing Committee on Justice and Legal Affairs. As a 'Perry Mason' style trial lawyer, he had over two dozen murder trials where he won the cases as barrister for the accused. He was a descendant of Sir Matthew Hale, Lord Chief Justice of England.

Woolliams first represented Alberta's Bow River electoral district. His first attempt to win the riding in the 1957 federal election was unsuccessful, but he would defeat incumbent Charles Edward Johnston in the 1958 election. Woolliams was re-elected there in 1962, 1963 and 1965.

== Career ==
In the 1960s, Woolliams was one of the main friends of John Diefenbaker's top friends, and they had fought defense trials together in Saskatchewan and Alberta. He was responsible with colleague Erik Nielsen in bringing pressure on the Pearson and Trudeau governments, and a few cabinet ministers, particularity the Justice Minister, had to resign their portfolios.

When the ridings were redrawn in 1966, Woolliams was elected in the Calgary North riding in the 1968 election and was re-elected there in 1972, 1974, and 1979. In his last years in the House of Commons, he sat on the front bench of the Conservatives and remained a formidable opponent of Liberal policies of the governments of Pierre Trudeau. Chiefly, as Shadow Justice Minister, Woolliams in many speeches warned of the Napoleonic legal philosophy of the Liberals and that the socio-political engineering, such as Trudeau's Charter of Rights and Freedoms, would erode ancient British guarantees of individual rights in favour of a politically-correct philosophy of group rights and legislation from the Supreme Court of Canada, which, he believed, would erode democracy and true justice and freedom. It was a singular blow for him that he was not given the Justice Ministry under new Conservative leader Joe Clark in 1979. He warned against Clark's exclusion of the Quebec Creditists, which caused the minority government to be defeated over the 1980 budget after only nine months.

Woolliams left national politics in 1980 and did not campaign in that year's national elections after he had served eight successive terms from the 24th to the 31st Canadian Parliaments. The Clark government was defeated in the 1980 elections by a rejuvenated Liberal regime still under Trudeau.

After the return of the Conservatives to power under Brian Mulroney, Woolliams served in the capacity of emeritus adviser and Chairman of the Justices Commission, which was given more financial resources for its time on the bench.

== Later life and legacy ==
He studied at Saskatchewan Teacher's College and the University of Saskatchewan and was appointed Queen's Counsel. Diefenbaker called Woolliams the best defense trial lawyer in Canada during his day. He also was made special Lecturer on Peace through Law in Belgrade, Yugoslavia, during his service in the Canadian Parliament. A scholarship fund in his name exists at the University of Saskatchewan College of Law.

== Sources ==
- Eldon M Woolliams QC, barrister, Supreme Court of Canada reported cases (online) and decisions
- CBC Archives: Eldon Woolliams QC MP, as Justice Critic, role in Tory Opposition to the Trudeau Omnibus Bill (1968)liberalizing abortion, homosexuality, no-fault divorce etc., & TV interview by the CBC's Barbara Frum
