= Douglas Harkness =

Canadian politician (1903–1999)

The Honourable Douglas Harkness PC OC GM ED
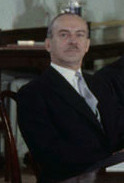

Minister of National Defence
- In office 11 October 1960 – 3 February 1963
- Prime Minister: John Diefenbaker
- Preceded by: George Pearkes
- Succeeded by: Vacant

Minister of Agriculture
- In office 21 June 1957 – 10 October 1960
- Prime Minister: John Diefenbaker
- Preceded by: James Garfield Gardiner
- Succeeded by: Alvin Hamilton

Minister of Northern Affairs and National Resources
- In office 21 June 1957 – 18 August 1957
- Prime Minister: John Diefenbaker
- Preceded by: Jean Lesage
- Succeeded by: Alvin Hamilton

Member of Parliament for Calgary Centre
- In office 25 June 1968 – 29 October 1972
- Preceded by: Riding created
- Succeeded by: Harvie Andre

Member of Parliament for Calgary North
- In office 10 August 1953 – 24 June 1968
- Preceded by: Riding created
- Succeeded by: Eldon Woolliams

Member of Parliament for Calgary East
- In office 11 June 1945 – 9 August 1953
- Preceded by: George Henry Ross
- Succeeded by: John Kushner

Personal details
- Born: Douglas Scott Harkness; 29 March 1903 Toronto, Ontario, Canada
- Died: 2 May 1999 (aged 96) Calgary, Alberta, Canada
- Party: Progressive Conservative
- Spouse: Frances Elizabeth MacMillan (m. 1932; died 1991)
- Children: 1
- Education: University of Alberta (BA)
- Profession: Farmer; Teacher

Military service
- Branch/service: Canadian Army
- Years of service: 1940–1949
- Rank: Lieutenant Colonel
- Unit: 4th Canadian Armoured Division
- Battles/wars: World War II
- Awards: George Medal; Canadian Efficiency Decoration

Douglas Scott Harkness PC OC GM ED (29 March 1903 – 2 May 1999) was a Canadian politician.

== Early life and military service ==
He was born in Toronto, Ontario, and moved to Calgary, Alberta in 1929. He graduated from the University of Alberta, then farmed and taught school in the vicinity of Red Deer. He taught at Crescent Heights High School until 1939.

He fought during the Second World War from 1940 to 1945, serving in the European theater of war. He was posted to Great Britain, Sicily, Italy and Northwest Europe. In 1943 was awarded the George Medal "in recognition of conspicuous gallantry in carrying out hazardous work in a very brave manner". Harkness was aboard a troopship when it was torpedoed transiting from Sicily to England. Harkness was awarded the medal for his organization of the abandonment of the ship. In 1945, Harkness was the commanding officer of the 5th Anti-Tank Regiment of the 4th Armoured Division. After returning from the war, Harkness returned to farming, residing in De Winton, Alberta, south of Calgary.

== Member of Parliament ==
In 1945, Harkness was elected to the House of Commons of Canada for the constituency of Calgary East and briefly held the Cabinet positions of Minister of Northern Affairs and Minister of National Revenue under the government of John Diefenbaker. He was sworn into the Queen's Privy Council for Canada on August 7, 1957, as Minister of Agriculture.

Harkness was appointed Minister of National Defence, being sworn in on October 11, 1960. He precipitated a political crisis when he resigned from cabinet in February 1963 to protest Diefenbaker's opposition to stationing American nuclear warheads in Canada. The resignation precipitated a split in the cabinet and contributed to the defeat of the government in the 1963 federal election. He continued to sit as a Member of Parliament until 1972.

== Post-political career ==
He lived in Calgary until his death in 1999. In 1978 he was made an Officer of the Order of Canada. The Douglas Harkness Community School in Calgary is named in his honour.

== Parliamentary functions ==
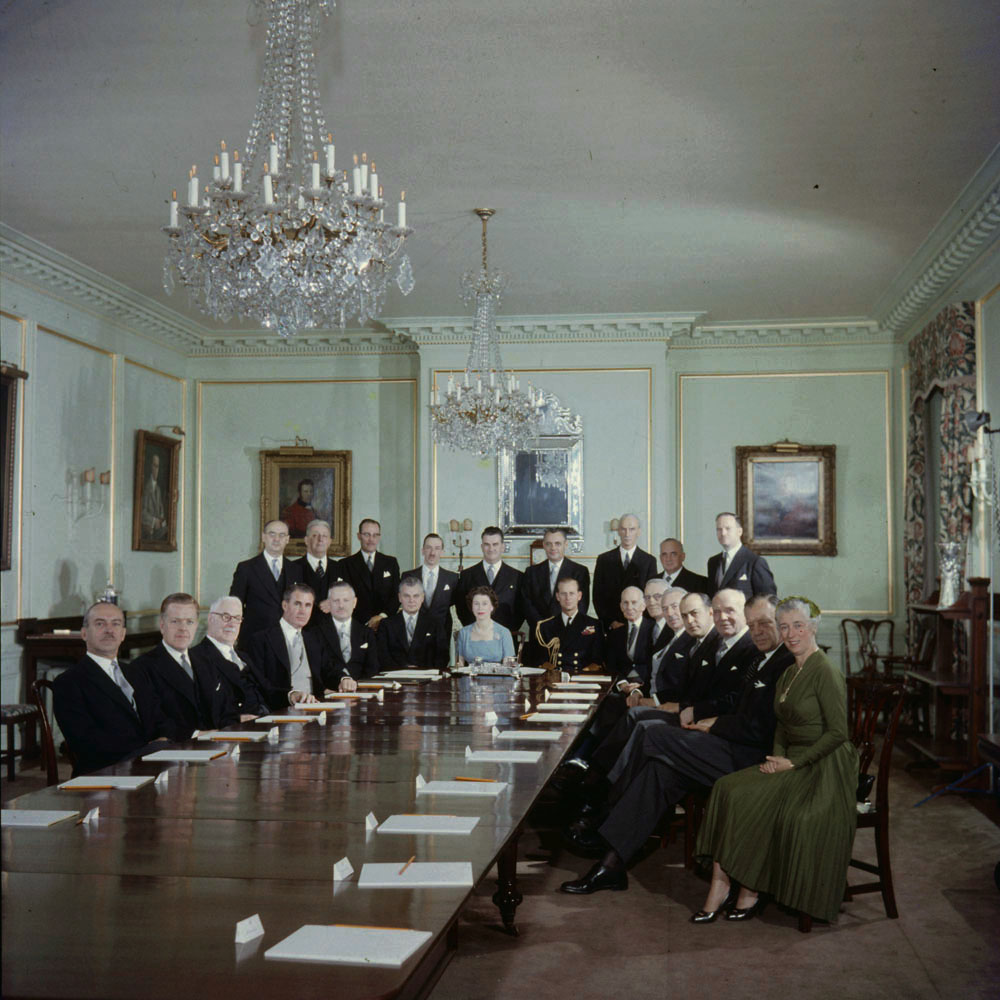
Douglas Harkness (first from left) with other members of the government in 1957 on a visit by Queen Elizabeth and the Duke of Edinburgh.

- Minister of Agriculture (Acting), (June 21 – August 6, 1957)
- Minister of Northern Affairs and National Resources, (June 21 – August 18, 1957)
- Minister of Agriculture, (August 7, 1957 – October 10, 1960)
- Minister of National Defence, (October 11, 1960 – February 3, 1963)

== Archives ==
There is a Douglas Scott Harkness fonds at Library and Archives Canada.
