= Len Werry =

Canadian politician

Leonard "Len" F. Werry

Member of the Legislative Assembly of Alberta
- In office May 23, 1967 – August 29, 1971
- Preceded by: Charles Johnston
- Succeeded by: District abolished
- Constituency: Calgary Bowness
- In office August 30, 1971 – February 25, 1973
- Preceded by: New District
- Succeeded by: Stewart McCrae
- Constituency: Calgary-Foothills

Minister of Telephones and Utilities
- In office September 10, 1971 – February 25, 1973
- Preceded by: Raymond Reierson
- Succeeded by: Roy Farran

Personal details
- Born: May 30, 1927 Cereal, Alberta
- Died: February 25, 1973 (aged 45) near Edson, Alberta

Leonard Frank Werry (May 30, 1927 – February 25, 1973) was a provincial level politician from Alberta, Canada. He served as a member of the Legislative Assembly of Alberta from 1967 until his death in 1973 and was a cabinet minister in the government of Alberta, of Premier Peter Lougheed from 1971 to 1973.

== Political career ==
Werry ran as a Progressive Conservative candidate in the Northwest Calgary riding of Calgary Bowness in the 1967 Alberta general election. He defeated former Member of Parliament Charles Johnston in a hotly contested election to pick up that seat for the opposition Progressive Conservatives.

Werry ran for a second term in office in Calgary-Foothills in the 1971 Alberta general election as Calgary Bowness was abolished through redistricting. He picked up the new riding with a more comfortable result.

The Progressive Conservative party formed government in 1971. Premier Peter Lougheed appointed Werry as Minister of Telephones and Utilities. Werry died on February 25, 1973, when his car collided with a truck on Highway 16, approximately nine miles west of Edson, Alberta.
