= Charles Edward Johnston =

Canadian politician

Member of Parliament
- In office 1935–1958
- Preceded by: Edward Joseph Garland
- Succeeded by: Eldon Woolliams
- Constituency: Bow River

Member of the Legislative Assembly of Alberta
- In office 1959–1967
- Preceded by: New District
- Succeeded by: Len Werry
- Constituency: Calgary Bowness

Personal details
- Born: February 12, 1899 Bay Mills, Michigan, United States
- Died: December 1, 1971 (aged 72) Houston, Texas, United States
- Party: Social Credit

Charles Edward Johnston (February 12, 1899 – December 1, 1971) was a teacher and a long serving Canadian politician. He served as a member of the House of Commons of Canada for the opposition federal Social Credit party from 1935 to 1958. He moved to provincial politics and served as a member of the Legislative Assembly of Alberta from 1959 to 1967 for the governing Alberta Social Credit party.

== Political career ==
=== Federal career ===
Johnston first ran for the House of Commons of Canada as a Social Credit candidate in the 1935 Canadian federal election. He defeated incumbent Member of Parliament Edward Joseph Garland to win his first term in office. Johnston ran for re-election in the 1940 Canadian federal election. The election was hotly contested, he defeated four other candidates including former Alberta provincial Member of the Legislative Assembly Aylmer Liesemer.

Johnston would increase his margin of victory winning his third term in office defeating four other candidates in the 1945 Canadian federal election. The 1949 Canadian federal election would bring Johnston his largest vote total as he defeated five other candidates to win his fourth consecutive term in office. He would be re-elected to a fifth term in office with another comfortable plurality in the 1953 Canadian federal election. Johnston would suffer near defeat in the 1957 Canadian federal election winning by just 300 votes over Progressive Conservative candidate Eldon Woolliams. Parliament would be dissolved a year later, and this time Johnston would be defeated in a landslide, after facing Woolliams once again in the 1958 Canadian federal election.

=== Provincial career ===
After being defeated from federal politics he would run for a seat to the Alberta Legislature as the governing Alberta Social Credit candidate in the new provincial electoral district of Calgary Bowness. He would win his first term in office with a landslide taking almost 60% of the popular vote. He was re-elected to a second term in office in the 1963 Alberta general election. His popular vote would decline but he still won his district with more than 50%. Johnston ran for a third term in office in the 1967 general election. He was defeated in a closely contested race by Progressive Conservative candidate Len Werry.

Johnston died on December 1, 1971.
