= Frederick Wright (politician) =

Canadian politician

Frederick William Wright

Member of Parliament for Calgary North
- In office 1980–1984
- Preceded by: Eldon Woolliams
- Succeeded by: Paul Gagnon

Personal details
- Born: 28 October 1933 (age 92) New Glasgow, Nova Scotia
- Party: Progressive Conservative
- Profession: investment counsellor, property manager

Frederick William Wright (born 28 October 1933 in New Glasgow, Nova Scotia) was a Progressive Conservative party member of the House of Commons of Canada. He was an investment counsellor and property manager by career.

He served in the 32nd Canadian Parliament at the Calgary North electoral district which he won in the 1980 federal election. He left federal politics after this single term and did not campaign in the 1984 election.

Parliament of Canada
Preceded by Eldon Woolliams	Member of Parliament Calgary North; 1980-1984	Succeeded by Paul Gagnon
