= David Bexte =

Canadian politician

David Bexte MP
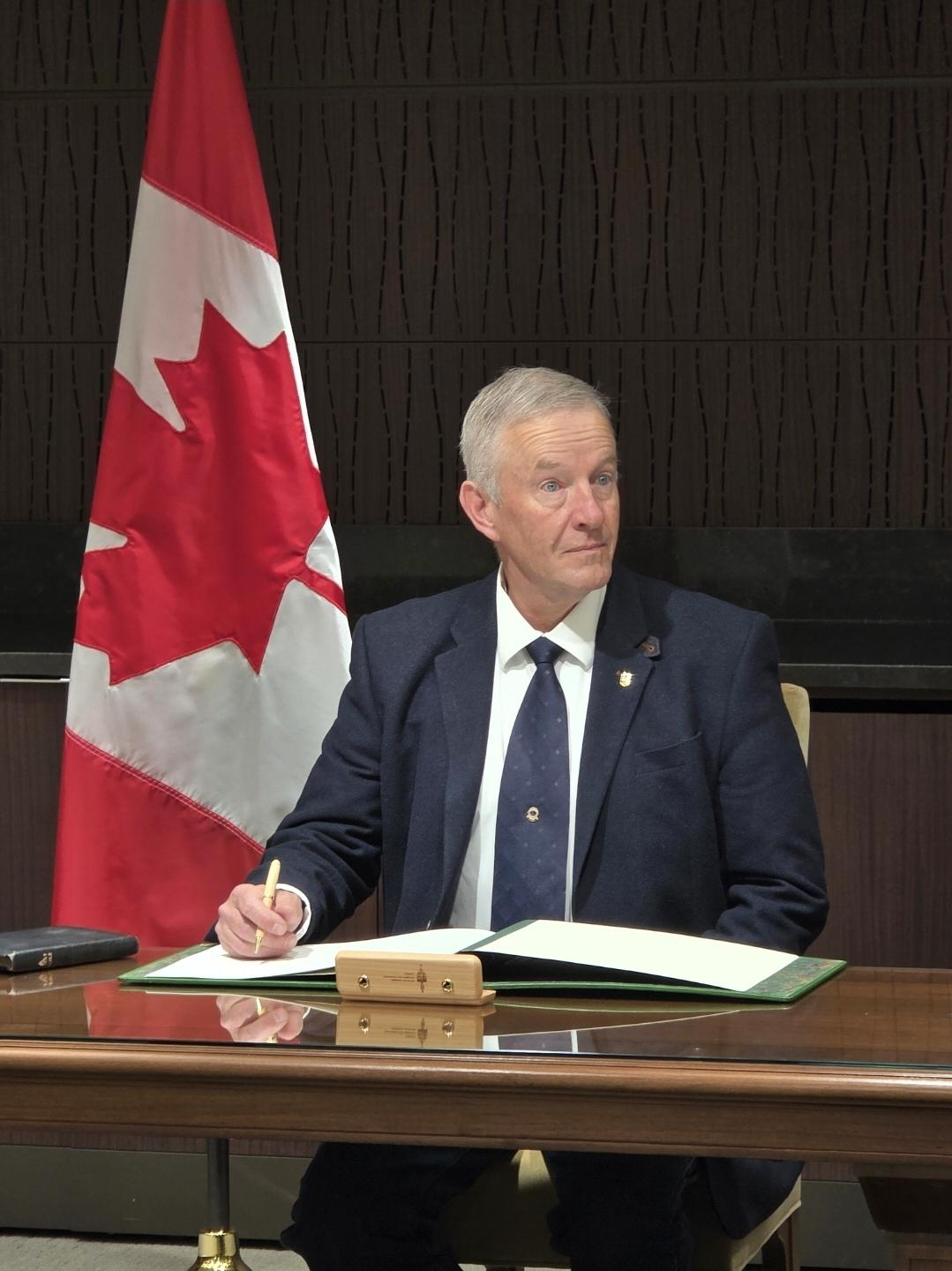
- David Bexte, Member of Parliament for Bow River at his swearing in ceremony in Ottawa, May 26th, 2025

Member of Parliament for Bow River
- Incumbent
- Assumed office April 28, 2025
- Preceded by: Martin Shields

Personal details
- Party: Conservative
- Spouse: Lorelei Bexte
- Children: Keean Bexte

David Bexte MP is a Canadian politician from the Conservative Party of Canada. He was elected Member of Parliament for Bow River in the 2025 Canadian federal election. He is a former energy executive at Schlumberger Canada and farmer.

On April 17th, 2026, Bexte introduced a bill to help speed up the approval of farm products in Canada. Bill C-273, Facilitating Agricultural Regulatory Modernization Act, or FARM Act, proposes provisional approval within 90 days for feeds, seeds, fertilizers, and pest control products that have already been approved in at least two trusted jurisdictions. Such jurisdictions cited include the USA, EU, United Kingdom, Australia and New Zealand.

At the time of the 2025 Canadian federal election, he lived in Mossleigh, Alberta.

== Electoral record ==
2025 Canadian federal election: Bow River
Party	Candidate	Votes	%	±%	Expenditures
Conservative	David Bexte	44,605	78.87	+9.11	$54,706.03
Liberal	Bentley Barnes	9,562	16.91	+9.34	$2,800.00
New Democratic	Louisa Gwin	1,689	2.99	–6.25	$599.77
Christian Heritage	Tom Lipp	402	0.71	–0.05	$1,031.62
United	Aaron Patton	296	0.52	–	$1,179.50
Total valid votes/expense limit		56,554	99.31	–	$141,397.58
Total rejected ballots		391	0.69	+0.10	
Turnout		56,945	66.55	+4.00	
Eligible voters		85,571			
Conservative hold		Swing		+9.23	
Source: Elections Canada
