= Howard Hadden Halladay =

Canadian politician

Member of the Canadian House of Commons
- In office 1917 – October 30, 1925
- Preceded by: New District
- Succeeded by: Edward Garland
- Constituency: Bow River

Personal details
- Born: June 15, 1875 Elgin, Ontario, Canada
- Died: January 23, 1952 (aged 76) Los Angeles County, California, U.S.
- Party: Independent Farmer
- Other political affiliations: Unionist
- Occupation: politician

Howard Hadden Halladay (June 15, 1875 – January 23, 1952) was a farmer, insurance agent, and Canadian federal politician. He served as a member of the House of Commons of Canada from 1917 to 1921, sitting as a Unionist candidate in government. He also served as a municipal politician from 1913 to 1918 as mayor of Hanna, Alberta.

== Political career ==
Halladay began his political career on the municipal level, serving as mayor of Hanna, Alberta, from 1913 to 1918.

While still mayor he ran for a seat in the Canadian House of Commons in the 1917 Canadian federal election. In that election he ran as the Unionist coalition candidate. He defeated three other candidates by a comfortable margin including future Alberta MLA Daniel Galbraith to take the new seat. Halladay served as a Member of Parliament for a single term before retiring at dissolution in 1921.
