= Diane Ablonczy =

Canadian politician (born 1949)

The Honourable Diane Ablonczy PC
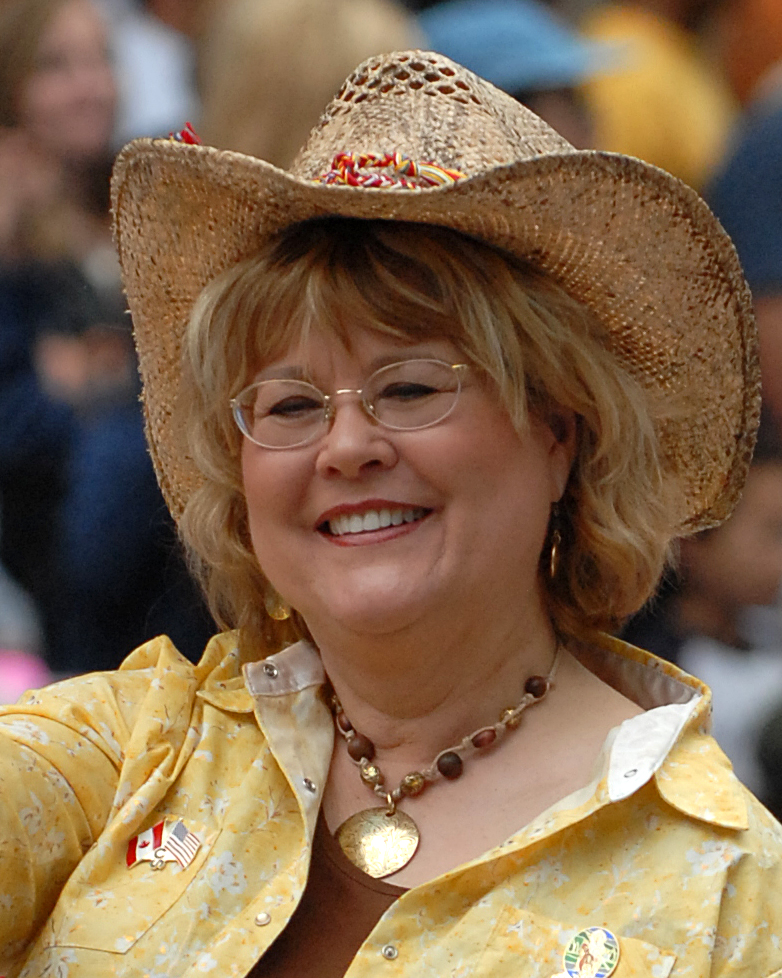

Member of Parliament for Calgary—Nose Hill Calgary North (1993-1997)
- In office October 25, 1993 – October 19, 2015
- Preceded by: Al Johnson
- Succeeded by: Michelle Rempel

Personal details
- Born: Diane Broadway; May 6, 1949 (age 77) Peoria, Illinois, U.S.
- Party: Conservative
- Other political affiliations: Reform (1993-2000); Canadian Alliance (2000-2003)
- Spouse(s): Tom Ablonczy (died 1984); Ron Sauer
- Children: 1 daughter 4 step-children
- Profession: Farmer, lawyer, teacher

Diane Ablonczy PC (née Broadway; /əˈblɒnsi/ ə-BLON-see; born May 6, 1949) is a former Canadian Member of Parliament who served in the House of Commons of Canada. Ablonczy represented Calgary ridings from 1993 to 2015, sitting first with the Reform Party of Canada, then with the Canadian Alliance, and finally with the Conservative Party of Canada. She served as the Minister of State for Foreign Affairs (Americas and Consular Affairs) from January 4, 2011, to July 15, 2013. She was previously appointed Minister of State (Seniors) on January 19, 2010. She held the position of Minister of State (Small Business and Tourism) from October 30, 2008, Secretary of State (Small Business and Tourism) from August 14, 2007, and served as Parliamentary Secretary to the Minister of Finance from February 2006. Previously, Ablonczy served as Chief Opposition Critic for Citizenship and Immigration, Health, and Human Resources Development.

Ablonczy was first elected to the House of Commons in 1993 as the Reform Party Member of Parliament (MP) for Calgary North. In the riding redistribution of 1996, the riding of Calgary North ceased to exist and Ablonczy was re-elected as MP for Calgary—Nose Hill in 1997 (Reform Party), 2000 (Canadian Alliance), 2004, 2006, 2008, and 2011 (Conservative Party). On July 4, 2013, Ablonczy announced she would not seek re-election in the 2015 federal election.

== Background ==
Diane Broadway was born in 1949 in Peoria, Illinois, United States, as the oldest of six children. A year later the family moved to Three Hills, Alberta, and Ablonczy grew up in a variety of places in rural Alberta. In 1967 she graduated from high school in Lac La Biche. In 1973 she received her Education degree from the University of Calgary and subsequently taught English, creative writing, and other subjects.

She married Tom Ablonczy, a well site engineer and refugee of the 1956 Hungarian revolution. They had one daughter. They ran a barley-growing operation, and in 1980 Diane earned her law degree from the University of Calgary. The family moved to Calgary where she had her general law practice from 1981 to 1991. She was widowed in 1984 and is now married to Ron Sauer. She has one daughter, four stepchildren, and eight grandchildren.

== Political career ==
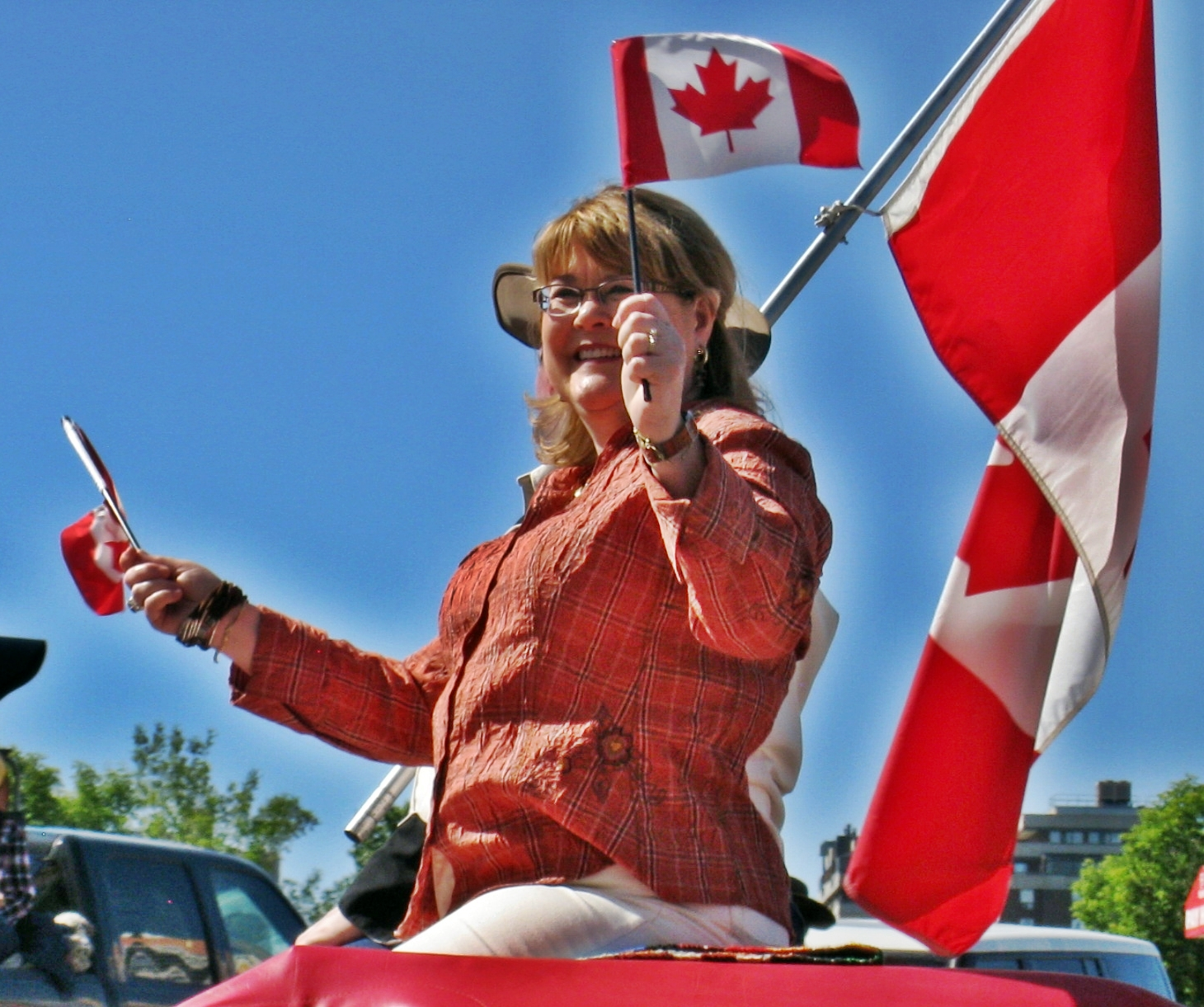
Diane Ablonczy waves the Canadian flag during the 2010 Calgary Stamepede parade.

Ablonczy's first political involvement was in 1982, when she briefly belonged to the Western Canada Concept party, but left to join the Provincial Rights Association (PRA) a few months later. Since the PRA was formed too late to gain official political party status, she ran as an independent candidate in Calgary-Mountain View in the 1982 Alberta provincial election.

In early 1987, Ablonczy joined the Reform Association of Canada, and later that year became a founding member of the Reform Party of Canada. She was elected as the first Party Chairman and served two terms in this role. As chair she was active in developing the Party's organization, administration, and communications structure, acting as a senior Party spokesperson and encouraging the growth of the Party's membership. In 1991, she set aside her law practice and went on staff for the Party as a special assistant to Reform Party Leader Preston Manning, with responsibility for Party communications and strategic planning.

In the 1993 federal election, Ablonczy was elected to Parliament as the Reform Party candidate for the federal riding of Calgary North. In the following years, she continued to participate in Party affairs as a member of the Reform Party Strategy Committee. She also was a member of the Reform Party Expansion Committee, and she chaired the Reform Party Task Force on the Reform of Social Programs.

In 1998 and 1999, Ablonczy promoted the United Alternative process to create a new federal political party on the political right. As co-chair of the UA policy committee, she took part in developing a comprehensive draft policy document and guiding it through a series of public consultations across the country. The resulting Declaration of Policy was approved as official Party Policy by members at the Founding Convention of the Canadian Alliance on March 25, 2000. The Reform Party was dissolved, and the Canadian Alliance was created. Ablonczy was re-elected under the new party's banner in the 2000 federal election.

In December 2001, Ablonczy entered the 2002 Canadian Alliance leadership contest on a platform of promoting "a process to combine the Canadian Alliance, the Progressive Conservative Party of Canada, and other interested partners into an effective, unified opposition party before the next election." She placed third with 3.8% of the vote. In late 2003, the Progressive Conservative Party merged with the Canadian Alliance to create the new Conservative Party of Canada.

On November 18, 2002, Ablonczy posed a question in the House of Commons concerning the government's system of "screening and security checks" as related to Maher Arar, a dual Canadian and Syrian citizen who had recently been deported from the United States to Syria as a terror suspect. Based on newly released information Ablonczy asked what the government "is doing to protect Canadian security" and why "the U.S. could uncover this man's background so quickly" when the Canadian government failed to find what she described as "his al-Qaeda links". Ablonczy also criticized the Chrétien government for "chastising the U.S. for sending Arar back to Syria where he is also a citizen". Arar was imprisoned for over a year in Syria and was repeatedly tortured by Syrian authorities. The RCMP later confirmed that Arar has no ties to any terrorist organizations.

On July 6, 2009, Conservative Member of Parliament Brad Trost indicated that several Conservative parliamentarians were surprised by Ablonczy's decision to provide funding for the Toronto Pride Week Festival. Ablonczy later lost authority over such funding projects to another cabinet minister. This was denied by government spokesman Darren Cunningham, as reported in the national media.

In a cabinet shuffle on January 19, 2010, Diane Ablonczy changed portfolios to become the Minister of State for Seniors. The move was widely seen as a demotion in response to her decision to provide funding to the Toronto Pride Week Festival; a move which resulted in backlash among some of her supporters.

On January 4, 2011, she received a promotion to Minister of State for Foreign Affairs (Americas and Consular Affairs).

On July 4, 2013, Ablonczy announced her retirement from parliament at the next election.

In 2015, Ablonczy opposed amendments to Bill C-51 proposed by the Green Party that called for consideration for "rule of law" and "principles of fundamental justice", by using air quotes when saying those two legal principles and because "action would be pretty much at a stalemate."

== Parliamentary career ==
=== 35th Parliament (1993–1997) ===
Diane Ablonczy was first elected to the House of Commons on October 25, 1993. She won as candidate for the Reform Party in Calgary North, with a 52.5% majority. The Reform Party catapulted from 1 to 52 seats. Ablonczy served in the following positions:

- Whip for the Reform Caucus (elected by her colleagues and the first woman of any party to hold that position.)
- Member of the Standing Committee on Procedure and House Affairs
- Member of the Reform Caucus Committee on Immigration.
- Reform Party Critic for Human Resources Development
- Member of the Standing Committee on Human Resources Development.
- Deputy Critic for Justice
- Critic for Atlantic Issues
- Member of the Standing Committee on Justice and Legal Affairs.

From 1995 to 1997, she hosted a Calgary Cable bi-weekly live, phone-in TV show called Dial Your MP, which provided Calgarians with an opportunity to ask questions on a variety of federal government issues.

=== 36th Parliament (1997–2000) ===
On June 2, 1997, after a riding redistribution in 1996 in which Calgary North was dissolved, Ablonczy was re-elected as the MP for Calgary—Nose Hill, with a 51.5% majority. The Reform Party won 60 seats and became the Official Opposition. Ablonczy served in the following positions:

- Member of the Reform Party Shadow Cabinet
- Chief Official Opposition Critic for Human Resources Development.
- Member of the Standing Committee on Human Resources Development and the Status of Persons with Disabilities.

=== 37th Parliament (2000–2004) ===
On November 27, 2000, Ablonczy was re-elected as the Calgary-Nose Hill MP for the Canadian Alliance, this time with a 60.1% majority. The Alliance won 66 seats and became Official Opposition. Ablonczy served in the following positions:

- Member of the Canadian Alliance Shadow Cabinet
- Chief Official Opposition Critic for Health
- Member of the Standing Committee on Health. In the spring of 2001, she embarked on a self-financed fact-finding mission to study health care systems in France, Sweden and the Netherlands. She resigned her Critic position on December 17, 2001, to become a candidate in the Canadian Alliance Leadership Election.
- Official Opposition Critic for Citizenship and Immigration.
- Vice Chair of the Standing Committee on Citizenship and Immigration
- Associate Member of the Standing Committee on Public Accounts that investigated the sponsorship scandal.

=== 38th Parliament (2004–2006) ===
On June 28, 2004, Ablonczy was once more elected as the MP for Calgary-Nose Hill, this time for the new Conservative Party. She won with an increased majority of 64.4%. The Conservative Party won 99 seats, making it the Official Opposition. Ablonczy held the following positions:

- Member of the Conservative Party Shadow Cabinet
- Chief Official Opposition Critic for Citizenship & Immigration.
- Member of the Standing Committee on Citizenship and Immigration.

In 2005, she chaired a series of National Consultations on Canada's Immigration System and developed the Conservative Party's immigration policies.

=== 39th Parliament (2006–2008) ===
On January 23, 2006, Ablonczy was re-elected with an increased vote percentage of 68.5%. The Conservatives won 124 seats and formed a minority Conservative government. In the first 18 months of the Harper government Ablonczy served in the following positions:

- Parliamentary Secretary to the Minister of Finance.
- Canadian Representative at Organisation for Economic Co-operation and Development and European Bank for Reconstruction and Development meetings
- Member of the Standing Committee on Finance.
- Member of the historic all-Party Ad Hoc Committee to Review a Nominee for the Supreme Court of Canada that interviewed Supreme Court Nominee Judge Marshall Rothstein on February 27, 2006, televised live on national news channels.

In August 2007, Ablonczy was named to the Federal Cabinet as junior Minister holding the following positions:

- Secretary of State responsible for Small Business & Tourism.
- Member of the Cabinet Operations Committee
- Member of the Cabinet Committee for Economic Growth and Long Term Prosperity.

=== 40th Parliament (2008–2011) ===
On October 14, 2008, Ablonczy was re-elected with her largest majority ever: 69.6%. The Conservatives won a second minority government with 143 seats. On October 30, 2008, Diane Ablonczy was sworn into Cabinet as Minister of State for Small Business & Tourism in the second Harper government. She served in the following Cabinet Committees:

- Treasury Board Submissions
- Economic Growth and Long Term Prosperity
- Environment and Energy Security.

Ablonczy oversaw the development and implementation of the following important Ministry initiatives:

- Paper Burden Reduction. On March 20, 2009, Ablonczy announced that the federal government had reached its goal of reducing the paperwork required of Canadian small businesses by 20 percent.
- BizPal, an online tool to simplify the permit application process for entrepreneurs, was expanded to a rapidly increasing number of governments
- Small Business Internship Program – a program designated to help small business by supplying the salaries of student interns to work in their offices.
- The Marquee Tourism Events Program – announced in Budget 2009 as a $100 million economic stimulus initiative for tourism. In time for the summer tourist season the MTEP provided funding for a few dozen large and well-established festivals across Canada to help them deliver world-class programs and draw bigger crowds.
- Development of a National Tourism Strategy to guide future investments and to bring greater coherence to federal activities in support of tourism.

In the cabinet shuffle of January 19, 2010, Diane Ablonczy changed portfolios and became the Minister of State for Seniors.

Bill C-40, An Act to establish National Seniors Day, introduced by Minister of State Ablonczy, received Royal Assent on November 18, 2010. Through this legislation, October 1 will now be recognized as National Seniors Day.

During 2010 Ablonczy continued to serve as Member of the Treasury Board, and also was Vice Chair of the Cabinet Committee on Social Affairs.

On January 4, 2011, Ablonczy was appointed Minister of State for Foreign Affairs and the position was expanded to include responsibility for the Americas and Consular Affairs. She became a member of the Cabinet Committee on Foreign Affairs and Defense, and continued to be a member of the Treasury Board.

=== 41st Parliament (2011–2015) ===
The May 2, 2011 election saw Ablonczy re-elected with 70.2% of the vote. The Conservatives formed a majority government with 166 seats, representing all provinces and the North. Ablonczy was re-appointed Minister of State of Foreign Affairs (Americas and Consular Affairs) in the new cabinet announced on May 18, 2011.

During her tenure as Minister of State of Foreign Affairs (Americas and Consular Affairs) she visited all but three of the 35 Americas countries, representing the Canadian government on a variety of occasions, such as:

- Attended the inauguration of President Medina of the Dominican Republic
- Attended the General Assembly of the Organization of American States in Bolivia
- Accompanied the Governor General of Canada on his Official visit to Brazil, Trinidad and Tobago and Barbados
- Attended the Summit of the Americas with Prime Minister Harper in Cartagena, Colombia
- Participated in a Round table at the Organization of American States with ambassadors to the OAS representing countries from the Americas
- Worked with consular officials to promote safe travel habits of Canadians travelling abroad

In addition to her Cabinet position she served in the following Cabinet Committees:

- Legislative Committee on Bill C-18
- Foreign Affairs and Defense
- Public Safety and National Security
- Government Operations and Estimates
- Aboriginal Affairs and Northern Development

On July 4, 2013, Ablonczy announced she would not seek re-election in the 2015 federal election, confirming the decision in the House of Commons on May 28, 2015.

== Electoral history ==
2011 Canadian federal election: Calgary—Nose Hill
Party	Candidate	Votes	%	±%	Expenditures
Conservative	Diane Ablonczy	40,384	70.17	+0.55	$63,917.43
New Democratic	Colin Anderson	7,189	12.49	+4.66	none listed
Liberal	Margaret McLeod	6,501	11.30	–1.93	$33,697.01
Green	Tony Hajj	3,480	6.05	–3.26	$10,363.14
Total valid votes/expense limit		57,554	99.71	–	$101,293.01
Total rejected ballots		169	0.29	–0.05	
Turnout		57,723	56.64	+2.78	
Eligible voters		101,910			
Conservative hold		Swing		+2.61	
Source: Elections Canada

2008 Canadian federal election: Calgary—Nose Hill
Party	Candidate	Votes	%	±%	Expenditures
Conservative	Diane Ablonczy	35,029	69.62	+1.13	$52,910.69
Liberal	Anoush Newman	6,657	13.23	–3.87	$9,596.78
Green	Tony Hajj	4,685	9.31	+2.84	$6,944.85
New Democratic	Stephanie Sundberg	3,941	7.83	–0.11	$852.80
Total valid votes/expense limit		50,312	99.66	–	$93,719.48
Total rejected ballots		171	0.34	+0.11	
Turnout		50,483	53.86	–9.97	
Eligible voters		93,731			
Conservative hold		Swing		+2.50	
Source: Elections Canada

2006 Canadian federal election: Calgary—Nose Hill
Party	Candidate	Votes	%	±%	Expenditures
Conservative	Diane Ablonczy	37,815	68.49	+4.11	$54,492.37
Liberal	Ted Haney	9,443	17.10	–5.79	$58,069.61
New Democratic	Bruce Kaufman	4,385	7.94	+1.21	$6,417.76
Green	Juliet Burgess	3,573	6.47	+0.47	$606.00
Total valid votes/expense limit		55,216	99.77	–	$84,215.26
Total rejected ballots		130	0.23	–0.04	
Turnout		55,346	63.83	+2.62	
Eligible voters		86,703			
Conservative hold		Swing		+4.95	
Source: Elections Canada

2004 Canadian federal election: Calgary—Nose Hill
Party	Candidate	Votes	%	±%	Expenditures
Conservative	Diane Ablonczy	31,088	64.38	–10.31	$55,831.57
Liberal	Ted Haney	11,051	22.89	+3.46	$47,683.77
New Democratic	Vinay Dey	3,250	6.73	+3.01	$4,146.21
Green	Richard Larson	2,898	6.00	+4.17	$570.98
Total valid votes/expense limit		48,287	99.73	–	$77,488.62
Total rejected ballots		131	0.27	+0.06	
Turnout		48,418	61.21	+1.70	
Eligible voters		79,095			
Conservative notional gain		Swing		–6.89	
Source: Elections Canada

2000 Canadian federal election: Calgary—Nose Hill
Party	Candidate	Votes	%	±%	Expenditures
Alliance	Diane Ablonczy	35,904	60.13	+8.33	$59,338
Liberal	Brian Thiessen	11,602	19.43	–5.81	$20,306
Progressive Conservative	James F. Mcardle	8,696	14.56	–2.86	$5,320
New Democratic	Jon Adams	2,227	3.73	–0.05	$893
Green	Andrew Pickles	1,092	1.83	+0.55	$2,410
Canadian Action	Maureen Ann Roberts	194	0.32	–	$2,411
Total valid votes		59,715	99.79		
Total rejected ballots		123	0.21	+0.01	
Turnout		59,838	59.51	–5.37	
Eligible voters		100,544			
Alliance notional hold		Swing		+7.07	
Source: Elections Canada

1997 Canadian federal election: Calgary—Nose Hill
Party	Candidate	Votes	%	±%	Expenditures
Reform	Diane Ablonczy	25,788	51.80	–	$64,740
Liberal	James Maxim	12,565	25.24	–	$47,359
Progressive Conservative	Pat Murray	8,678	17.43	–	$53,211
New Democratic	Andrea Garnier	1,883	3.78	–	$1,278
Green	Frank Young	637	1.28	–	$1,631
Natural Law	Gloria Hansen	237	0.48	–	$103
Total valid votes		49,788	99.80		
Total rejected ballots		102	0.20	–	
Turnout		49,890	64.88	–	
Eligible voters		76,891			
Reform notional hold		Swing		N/A	
Source: Elections Canada

28th Canadian Ministry (2006–2015) – Cabinet of Stephen Harper
Cabinet posts (3)
Predecessor	Office	Successor
position created in 2008	Minister of State (Small Business & Tourism) (2008–2010)	Rob Moore
Marjory LeBreton	Minister of State (Seniors) (2010–2011)	Julian Fantino
Peter Kent	Minister of State (Americas and Consular Affairs) (2011–2013)	Lynne Yelich
Sub-Cabinet Post
Predecessor	Title	Successor
Gerry Ritz	Secretary of State (Small Business & Tourism) (2007–2008)	position abolished in 2008
