= Martin Shields =

Canadian politician (born 1948)

Member of Parliament for Bow River
- In office October 19, 2015 – March 23, 2025
- Preceded by: Riding Created
- Succeeded by: David Bexte

Mayor of Brooks
- In office October 22, 2007 – October 27, 2015
- Preceded by: Don Weisbeck
- Succeeded by: Fred Rattai (acting)

Brooks City Councillor
- In office October 26, 2004 – October 22, 2007

Personal details
- Born: April 28, 1948 (age 77) Lethbridge, Alberta, Canada
- Party: Conservative
- Children: 3

Martin Shields (born April 28, 1948) is a Canadian politician, who was elected to represent the riding of Bow River in the House of Commons of Canada in the 2015 Canadian federal election.

Prior to his election, he served as the mayor of Brooks, Alberta since 2007. He was born in 1948 in Lethbridge, Alberta. Prior to his career in politics, Shields served as a teacher and school administrator for 30 years. He was also a part-time university instructor for 20 years.

On February 7, 2025, he announced he would stand down at the 2025 Canadian federal election.

== Electoral record ==
2021 Canadian federal election: Bow River
Party	Candidate	Votes	%	±%	Expenditures
Conservative	Martin Shields	35,676	69.76	–14.17	$56,370.62
People's	Jonathan Bridges	5,108	9.99	+7.59	$1,097.41
New Democratic	Michael MacLean	4,726	9.24	+3.64	none listed
Liberal	Getu Shawile	3,869	7.57	+1.82	$7,802.63
Maverick	Orrin Bliss	1,368	2.68	–	$8,111.55
Christian Heritage	Tom Lipp	391	0.76	–0.06	$9,741.82
Total valid votes/expense limit		51,138	99.42	–	$122,402.30
Total rejected ballots		300	0.58	+0.16	
Turnout		51,438	62.54	–6.15	
Eligible voters		82,243			
Conservative hold		Swing		–10.88	
Source: Elections Canada

2019 Canadian federal election: Bow River
Party	Candidate	Votes	%	±%	Expenditures
Conservative	Martin Shields	46,279	83.93	+6.51	$64,951.95
Liberal	Margaret Rhemtulla	3,173	5.75	–7.93	$1,667.55
New Democratic	Lynn MacWilliam	3,086	5.60	+0.35	none listed
People's	Tom Ikert	1,321	2.40	–	$7,382.38
Green	Hendrika Maria Tuithof de Jonge	826	1.50	–0.34	none listed
Christian Heritage	Tom Lipp	453	0.82	+0.26	$9,450.78
Total valid votes/expense limit		55,138	99.58	–	$117,895.71
Total rejected ballots		234	0.42	+0.12	
Turnout		55,372	68.69	+2.80	
Eligible voters		80,610			
Conservative hold		Swing		+7.22	
Source: Elections Canada

2015 Canadian federal election: Bow River
Party	Candidate	Votes	%	±%	Expenditures
Conservative	Martin Shields	38,701	77.42	–5.97	$79,588.40
Liberal	William MacDonald Alexander	6,840	13.68	+10.14	$2,815.97
New Democratic	Lynn MacWilliam	2,622	5.25	–2.91	$1,102.35
Green	Rita Ann Fromholt	919	1.84	–1.57	none listed
Independent	Andrew Kucy	543	1.09	–	$7,287.85
Christian Heritage	Frans Vandestroet	280	0.56	–	$883.46
Democratic Advancement	Fahed Khalid	83	0.17	–	none listed
Total valid votes/expense limit		49,988	99.70	–	$229,883.88
Total rejected ballots		151	0.30	–	
Turnout		50,139	65.89	–	
Eligible voters		76,093			
Conservative hold		Swing		–8.06	
Source: Elections Canada

2013 Brooks mayoral election
Candidate	Vote	%
Martin Shields	1,879	72.38
Priscilla Petersen	483	18.61
Loran Casimere Fells	234	9.01

2010 Brooks mayoral election
Candidate	Vote	%
Martin Shields	2,141	86.1
Patrick Ketchmark	346	13.9

2007 Brooks mayoral election
Candidate	Vote	%
Martin Shields	1,527	57.3
Carol Secondiak	1,137	42.7
