= Edward Joseph Garland =

Canadian politician (1887–1974)

Edward Joseph Garland MP
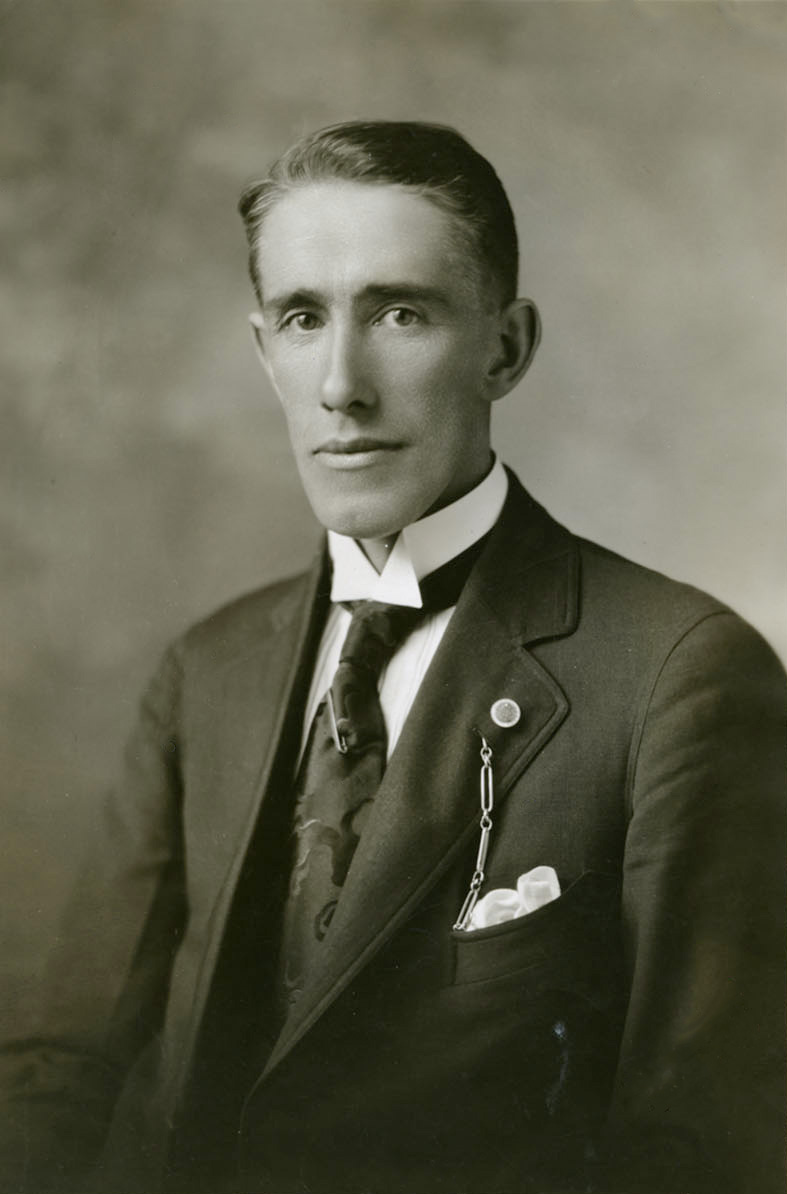
- Garland in 1926

Member of Parliament
- In office 1921–1935
- Preceded by: Howard Hadden Halladay
- Succeeded by: Charles Edward Johnston
- Constituency: Bow River

Personal details
- Born: 16 March 1887 Dublin, Ireland
- Died: 19 December 1974 (aged 87) Creston, British Columbia, Canada
- Party: United Farmers of Alberta
- Spouse: Alfrieda Garland (m. 1916)
- Children: 3
- Occupation: Farmer; politician; diplomat

Edward Joseph Garland MP (16 March 1887 – 19 December 1974) was an Irish-born Canadian farmer, politician and diplomat.

== Early life and education ==
Edward Joseph Garland was born on 16 March 1887 in Dublin to John Peter Garland, a physician, and Mary Garland (née Martin). Garland was one of 13 siblings and was raised in a Roman Catholic household.

Garland was educated at Belvedere College and attended Trinity College Dublin for two years before immigrating to Canada in 1908.

== Political career ==
Garland, an active member of the United Farmers of Alberta, was first elected to the House of Commons of Canada in the 1921 Canadian federal election as a candidate for the Progressive Party of Canada in Bow River. He defeated two other candidates in a landslide to win his first term in office. A founding member of the radical Ginger Group of MPs, he stood for re-election in the 1925 Canadian federal election, he was barely re-elected in a hotly contested election to win his second term in office. The government was dissolved after the Liberal-Progressive coalition fell apart and he ran for re-election again just a year later in the 1926 Canadian federal election winning re-election this time under the United Farmers of Alberta banner.

Standing for re-election in the 1930 Canadian federal election, he won his fourth term with a majority of votes cast in the district.

Garland was one of the group of radical MPs to meet following the 1930 election and plan the creation of a new party. He was a founding member of that party, the Co-operative Commonwealth Federation, when it was officially launched in 1932.

in the 1935 Canadian federal election, he stood as a CCF candidate but was defeated on his bid for a fifth term in office by Charles Edward Johnston from the Social Credit Party of Canada.

Garland served as president of the UFA in the early 1930s.

== Diplomatic career ==
In 1935, Garland joined the Canadian Diplomatic Corps and served as the secretary to the High Commissioner of Canada to Ireland. On 4 May 1946, Garland was appointed acting High Commissioner and served until the 19 March 1947. On 25 August 1947, Garland was appointed Canada's Ambassador to Norway and to Iceland from 16 March 1949, with both posts ending on 19 August 1952. In 1948, Garland served as the chargé d'affaires to Denmark.

== Personal life ==
On 26 August 1916, Garland married Alfrieda Garland (née Williams; formerly Ryning) in Big Valley, Alberta. Garland and Alfrieda had two children, and one daughter from Alfrieda's first marriage.

On 19 December 1974 died in Creston, British Columbia, aged 87.
