= Bow River (electoral district) =

Federal electoral district in Alberta, Canada

Alberta electoral district
- Interactive map of riding boundaries from the 2025 federal election

Federal electoral district
- Legislature: House of Commons
MP
David Bexte
Conservative
- District created: 2013
- First contested: 2015
- Last contested: 2025
- District webpage: profile, map

Demographics
- Population (2016): 115,022
- Electors (2019): 78,944
- Area (km²): 24,036.47
- Pop. density (per km²): 4.8
- Census division(s): Division No. 2, Division No. 5, Division No. 6
- Census subdivision(s): Rocky View (part), Chestermere, Brooks, Strathmore, Taber, Wheatland, Taber, Vulcan County (part), Siksika, Vauxhall

Bow River is a federal electoral district in southern Alberta, Canada, that has been represented in the House of Commons of Canada from 1917 to 1968, from 1979 to 1988 and since 2015.

This riding was first created in 1914 from Macleod riding. It was abolished in 1966 when it was redistributed into Calgary North, Crowfoot, Palliser and Rocky Mountain ridings.

It was re-created in 1976 from parts of Crowfoot, Lethbridge, Palliser and Rocky Mountain ridings. It was abolished in 1987 when it was redistributed into Calgary North, Calgary Northeast, Calgary West, Crowfoot, Lethbridge, Macleod, Red Deer and Wild Rose ridings.

It was re-created by the 2012 federal electoral boundaries redistribution and was legally defined in the 2013 representation order. It came into effect upon the call of the 42nd Canadian federal election, scheduled for October 2015. This newest iteration of the riding was created out of parts of Crowfoot (53%), Medicine Hat (37%) and Macleod (10%) ridings.

== Demographics ==
Panethnic groups in Bow River (2011−2021)
Panethnic group	2021		2016		2011	
Panethnic group	Pop.	%	Pop.	%	Pop.	%
European (Note: Statistic includes all persons that did not make up part of a visible minority or an indigenous identity.)	83,840	73.99%	85,535	78.35%	82,105	83.14%
Indigenous	7,545	6.66%	7,310	6.7%	5,935	6.01%
South Asian	6,360	5.61%	4,450	4.08%	2,520	2.55%
Southeast Asian (Note: Statistic includes total responses of "Filipino" and "Southeast Asian" under visible minority section on census.)	5,885	5.19%	4,550	4.17%	3,735	3.78%
African	4,345	3.83%	2,820	2.58%	1,405	1.42%
East Asian (Note: Statistic includes total responses of "Chinese", "Korean", and "Japanese" under visible minority section on census.)	1,685	1.49%	1,805	1.65%	1,450	1.47%
Latin American	1,550	1.37%	1,150	1.05%	630	0.64%
Middle Eastern (Note: Statistic includes total responses of "West Asian" and "Arab" under visible minority section on census.)	1,110	0.98%	950	0.87%	490	0.5%
Other/Multiracial (Note: Statistic includes total responses of "Visible minority, n.i.e." and "Multiple visible minorities" under visible minority section on census.)	1,005	0.89%	605	0.55%	495	0.5%
Total responses	113,320	94.86%	109,170	94.91%	98,760	95.08%
Total population	119,458	100%	115,022	100%	103,871	100%
Notes: Totals greater than 100% due to multiple origin responses. Demographics based on 2012 Canadian federal electoral redistribution riding boundaries.

== Members of Parliament ==
This riding has elected the following members of the House of Commons of Canada:

Parliament	Years	Member	Party
Bow River; Riding created from Macleod
13th	1917–1921	Howard Hadden Halladay	Government (Unionist)
14th	1921–1925	Edward Joseph Garland	Progressive
15th	1925–1926	Edward Joseph Garland	Progressive
16th	1926–1930	Edward Joseph Garland	United Farmers of Alberta
17th	1930–1932 (Note: Edward Joseph Garland was a founding member of the Co-operative Commonwealth, which was founded on 1 August 1932)	Edward Joseph Garland	United Farmers of Alberta
17th	1932–1935	Edward Joseph Garland	Co-operative Commonwealth
18th	1935–1940	Charles Edward Johnston	Social Credit
19th	1940–1945	Charles Edward Johnston	Social Credit
20th	1945–1949	Charles Edward Johnston	Social Credit
21st	1949–1953	Charles Edward Johnston	Social Credit
22nd	1953–1957	Charles Edward Johnston	Social Credit
23rd	1957–1958	Charles Edward Johnston	Social Credit
24th	1958–1962	Eldon Woolliams	Progressive Conservative
25th	1962–1963	Eldon Woolliams	Progressive Conservative
26th	1963–1965	Eldon Woolliams	Progressive Conservative
27th	1965–1968	Eldon Woolliams	Progressive Conservative
Riding dissolved into Calgary North, Crowfoot, Palliser and Rocky Mountain
Riding re-created from Crowfoot, Lethbridge, Palliser and Rocky Mountain
31st	1979–1980	Gordon Taylor	Progressive Conservative
32nd	1980–1984	Gordon Taylor	Progressive Conservative
33rd	1984–1988	Gordon Taylor	Progressive Conservative
Riding dissolved into Calgary North, Calgary Northeast, Calgary West, Crowfoot, Lethbridge, Macleod, Red Deer and Wild Rose
Riding re-created from Crowfoot, Medicine Hat and Macleod
42nd	2015–2019	Martin Shields	Conservative
43rd	2019–2021	Martin Shields	Conservative
44th	2021–2025	Martin Shields	Conservative
45th	2025–present	David Bexte	Conservative

== Election results ==
=== 2015–present ===
Graph of election results in Bow River (2013-) (minor parties that never got 2% of the vote or didn't run consistently are omitted)

2025 Canadian federal election
Party	Candidate	Votes	%	±%	Expenditures
Conservative	David Bexte	44,605	78.87	+9.11	$54,706.03
Liberal	Bentley Barnes	9,562	16.91	+9.34	$2,800.00
New Democratic	Louisa Gwin	1,689	2.99	–6.25	$599.77
Christian Heritage	Tom Lipp	402	0.71	–0.05	$1,031.62
United	Aaron Patton	296	0.52	–	$1,179.50
Total valid votes/expense limit		56,554	99.31	–	$141,397.58
Total rejected ballots		391	0.69	+0.10	
Turnout		56,945	66.55	+4.00	
Eligible voters		85,571			
Conservative hold		Swing		+9.23	
Source: Elections Canada

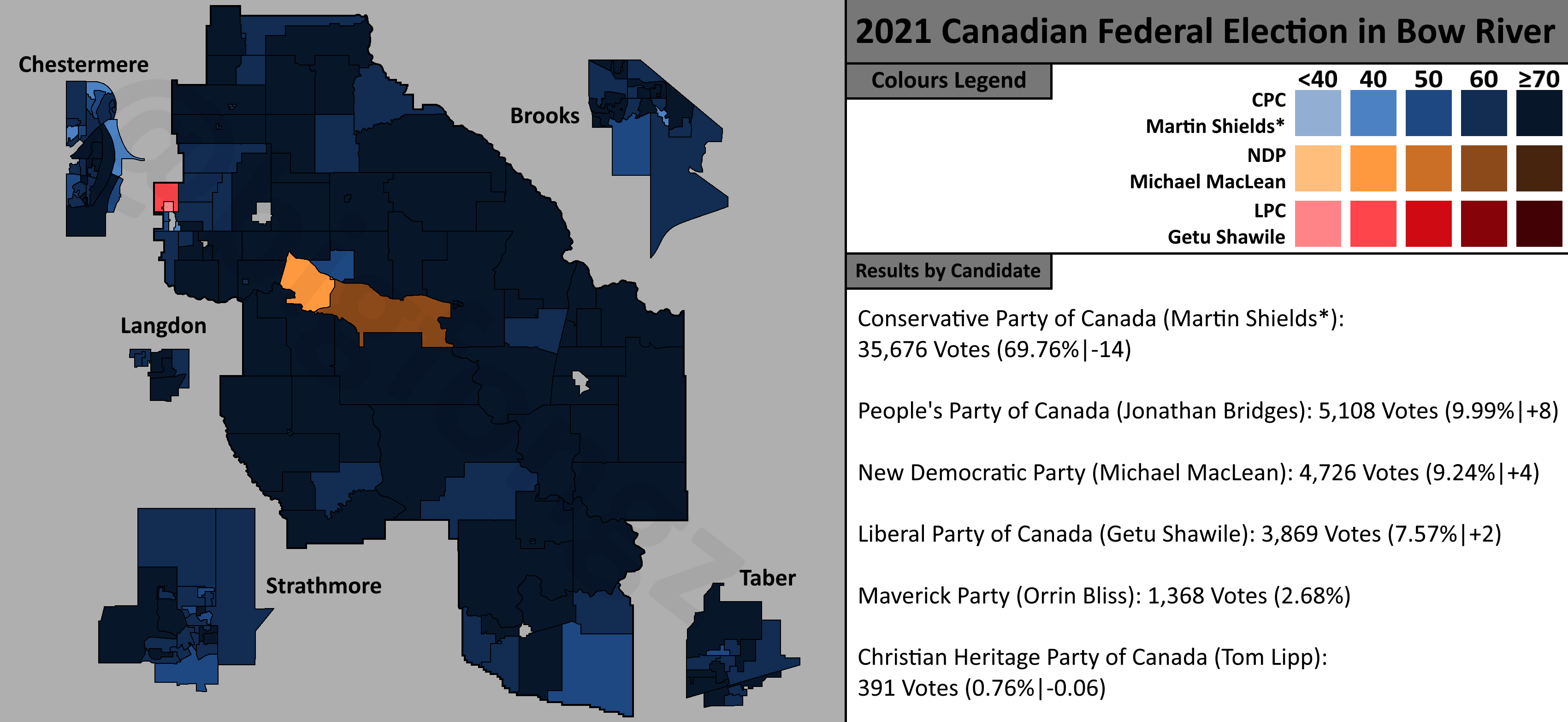
A map showing the 2021 general election results by polling division in Bow River.

2021 federal election redistributed results
Party	Vote	%
Conservative	33,292	69.57
People's	4,712	9.85
New Democratic	4,484	9.37
Liberal	3,763	7.86
Green	2	0.00
Others	1,604	3.35

2021 Canadian federal election
Party	Candidate	Votes	%	±%	Expenditures
Conservative	Martin Shields	35,676	69.76	–14.17	$56,370.62
People's	Jonathan Bridges	5,108	9.99	+7.59	$1,097.41
New Democratic	Michael MacLean	4,726	9.24	+3.64	none listed
Liberal	Getu Shawile	3,869	7.57	+1.82	$7,802.63
Maverick	Orrin Bliss	1,368	2.68	–	$8,111.55
Christian Heritage	Tom Lipp	391	0.76	–0.06	$9,741.82
Total valid votes/expense limit		51,138	99.42	–	$122,402.30
Total rejected ballots		300	0.58	+0.16	
Turnout		51,438	62.54	–6.15	
Eligible voters		82,243			
Conservative hold		Swing		–10.88	
Source: Elections Canada

2019 Canadian federal election
Party	Candidate	Votes	%	±%	Expenditures
Conservative	Martin Shields	46,279	83.93	+6.51	$64,951.95
Liberal	Margaret Rhemtulla	3,173	5.75	–7.93	$1,667.55
New Democratic	Lynn MacWilliam	3,086	5.60	+0.35	none listed
People's	Tom Ikert	1,321	2.40	–	$7,382.38
Green	Hendrika Maria Tuithof de Jonge	826	1.50	–0.34	none listed
Christian Heritage	Tom Lipp	453	0.82	+0.26	$9,450.78
Total valid votes/expense limit		55,138	99.58	–	$117,895.71
Total rejected ballots		234	0.42	+0.12	
Turnout		55,372	68.69	+2.80	
Eligible voters		80,610			
Conservative hold		Swing		+7.22	
Source: Elections Canada

2015 Canadian federal election
Party	Candidate	Votes	%	±%	Expenditures
Conservative	Martin Shields	38,701	77.42	–5.97	$79,588.40
Liberal	William MacDonald Alexander	6,840	13.68	+10.14	$2,815.97
New Democratic	Lynn MacWilliam	2,622	5.25	–2.91	$1,102.35
Green	Rita Ann Fromholt	919	1.84	–1.57	none listed
Independent	Andrew Kucy	543	1.09	–	$7,287.85
Christian Heritage	Frans Vandestroet	280	0.56	–	$883.46
Democratic Advancement	Fahed Khalid	83	0.17	–	none listed
Total valid votes/expense limit		49,988	99.70	–	$229,883.88
Total rejected ballots		151	0.30	–	
Turnout		50,139	65.89	–	
Eligible voters		76,093			
Conservative hold		Swing		–8.06	
Source: Elections Canada

2011 federal election redistributed results
Party	Vote	%
Conservative	30,412	83.39
New Democratic	2,976	8.16
Liberal	1,291	3.54
Green	1,244	3.41
Others	547	1.50

=== 1976–1987 ===
Graph of election results in Bow River (1976-1987) (minor parties that never got 2% of the vote or didn't run consistently are omitted)

1984 Canadian federal election
Party	Candidate	Votes	%	±%
Progressive Conservative	Gordon Taylor	43,033	76.20	–0.40
New Democratic	Bill McCutcheon	5,258	9.31	+2.26
Liberal	B.C. Tanner	4,066	7.20	–7.51
Rhinoceros	Gordon D. Taylor	2,349	4.16	–
Confederation of Regions	Dean Oseen	1,443	2.56	–
Social Credit	Tom Erhart	326	0.58	–1.07
Total valid votes		56,475	99.62	
Total rejected ballots		217	0.38	+0.14
Turnout		56,692	71.84	+5.71
Eligible voters		78,914		
Progressive Conservative hold		Swing		–1.33
Source: Elections Canada

1980 Canadian federal election
Party	Candidate	Votes	%	±%
Progressive Conservative	Gordon Taylor	30,463	76.60	+13.53
Liberal	Neville Tilley	5,850	14.71	+3.46
New Democratic	David Radke	2,802	7.05	+1.71
Social Credit	Edward M. Kiddle	656	1.65	–
Total valid votes		39,771	99.76	
Total rejected ballots		96	0.24	+0.05
Turnout		39,867	66.13	–7.35
Eligible voters		60,287		
Progressive Conservative hold		Swing		+8.50
Source: Elections Canada

1979 Canadian federal election
Party	Candidate	Votes	%	±%
Progressive Conservative	Gordon Taylor	25,973	63.07	–
Independent	Stanley Schumacher	8,378	20.34	–
Liberal	Madeline J. Hombert	4,633	11.25	–
New Democratic	Gale Burke	2,200	5.34	–
Total valid votes		41,184	99.81	
Total rejected ballots		80	0.19	–
Turnout		41,264	73.48	–
Eligible voters		56,159		
Progressive Conservative hold		Swing		N/A
Source: Elections Canada

=== 1917–1968 ===
Graph of election results in Bow River (1914-1966) (minor parties that never got 2% of the vote or didn't run consistently are omitted)

1965 Canadian federal election
Party	Candidate	Votes	%	±%
Progressive Conservative	Eldon Woolliams	12,611	53.14	+7.28
Social Credit	Ron Allen	5,671	23.89	–5.96
Liberal	W. James Anderson	3,615	15.23	–3.13
New Democratic	Doug Murdoch	1,836	7.74	+1.81
Total valid votes		23,733	99.36	
Total rejected ballots		152	0.64	+0.15
Turnout		23,885	71.44	–7.25
Eligible voters		33,433		
Progressive Conservative hold		Swing		+6.62
Source: Elections Canada

1963 Canadian federal election
Party	Candidate	Votes	%	±%
Progressive Conservative	Eldon Woolliams	11,461	45.86	–0.50
Social Credit	Francis J. Porter	7,460	29.85	+0.29
Liberal	Earl Hastings	4,589	18.36	+1.32
New Democratic	Walter W. Siewert	1,481	5.93	–1.11
Total valid votes		24,991	99.52	
Total rejected ballots		121	0.48	–0.11
Turnout		25,112	78.69	+3.94
Eligible voters		31,912		
Progressive Conservative hold		Swing		–0.40
Source: Elections Canada

1962 Canadian federal election
Party	Candidate	Votes	%	±%
Progressive Conservative	Eldon Woolliams	10,733	46.36	–16.76
Social Credit	Francis J. Porter	6,844	29.56	+1.49
Liberal	Earl Hastings	3,944	17.04	+8.23
New Democratic	Gordon Bowers	1,629	7.04	–
Total valid votes		23,150	99.41	
Total rejected ballots		137	0.59	+0.01
Turnout		23,287	74.75	–3.99
Eligible voters		31,153		
Progressive Conservative hold		Swing		–9.13
Source: Elections Canada

1958 Canadian federal election
Party	Candidate	Votes	%	±%
Progressive Conservative	Eldon Woolliams	12,695	63.12	+25.91
Social Credit	Charles Edward Johnston	5,646	28.07	–10.96
Liberal	Francis John Robert Olson	1,772	8.81	–14.94
Total valid votes		20,113	99.43	
Total rejected ballots		116	0.57	–0.05
Turnout		20,229	78.74	+1.59
Eligible voters		25,690		
Progressive Conservative gain from Social Credit		Swing		+18.44
Source: Elections Canada

1957 Canadian federal election
Party	Candidate	Votes	%	±%
Social Credit	Charles Edward Johnston	7,383	39.03	–8.54
Progressive Conservative	Eldon Woolliams	7,039	37.21	+19.68
Liberal	Arthur Cecil Bates	4,493	23.75	–6.78
Total valid votes		18,915	99.37	
Total rejected ballots		119	0.63	–0.07
Turnout		19,034	77.15	+12.57
Eligible voters		24,671		
Social Credit hold		Swing		–14.11
Source: Elections Canada

1953 Canadian federal election
Party	Candidate	Votes	%	±%
Social Credit	Charles Edward Johnston	7,320	47.57	+0.26
Liberal	William Duncan MacDonald	4,698	30.53	+5.87
Progressive Conservative	Wilfred John Wilde	2,698	17.53	+3.35
Labor–Progressive	Arthur Llewelyn Roberts	671	4.36	–1.01
Total valid votes		15,387	99.30	
Total rejected ballots		108	0.70	–0.39
Turnout		15,495	64.58	–3.35
Eligible voters		23,993		
Social Credit hold		Swing		+3.07
Source: Elections Canada

1949 Canadian federal election
Party	Candidate	Votes	%	±%
Social Credit	Charles Edward Johnston	8,537	47.31	+8.92
Liberal	William Duncan MacDonald	4,449	24.66	+12.44
Progressive Conservative	Wilfred John Wilde	2,558	14.18	–8.71
Co-operative Commonwealth	George Edwin Ellinson	1,530	8.48	–11.31
Labor–Progressive	Arthur Llewelyn Roberts	969	5.37	–1.34
Total valid votes		18,043	98.91	
Total rejected ballots		198	1.09	–1.62
Turnout		18,241	67.93	–5.53
Eligible voters		26,854		
Social Credit hold		Swing		+10.68
Source: Elections Canada

1945 Canadian federal election
Party	Candidate	Votes	%	±%
Social Credit	Charles Edward Johnston	6,569	38.39	+4.05
Progressive Conservative	John Angus McKinnon	3,917	22.89	+2.27
Co-operative Commonwealth	John Herbert Coldwell	3,386	19.79	+5.84
Liberal	William George Southern	2,091	12.22	–13.49
Labor–Progressive	John Blair Brown	1,149	6.71	–
Total valid votes		17,112	97.29	
Total rejected ballots		476	2.71	+1.00
Turnout		17,588	73.46	+5.44
Eligible voters		23,943		
Social Credit hold		Swing		+3.16
Source: Elections Canada

1940 Canadian federal election
Party	Candidate	Votes	%	±%
Social Credit	Charles Edward Johnston	5,410	34.34	–18.77
Liberal	Austin Claypool	4,050	25.71	+16.95
National Government	M.E. Manning	3,248	20.62	–1.18
Co-operative Commonwealth	Aylmer Liesemer	2,197	13.95	–2.38
Communist	Lawrence Anderson	847	5.38	–
Total valid votes		15,752	98.29	
Total rejected ballots		274	1.71	+0.73
Turnout		16,026	68.02	–1.19
Eligible voters		23,561		
Social Credit hold		Swing		–17.86
Source: Elections Canada

1935 Canadian federal election
Party	Candidate	Votes	%	±%
Social Credit	Charles Edward Johnston	7,529	53.11	–
Conservative	Andrew Davison	3,091	21.80	–22.61
Co-operative Commonwealth	Edward Joseph Garland	2,315	16.33	–29.26
Liberal	Charles Ross Walrod	1,242	8.76	–
Total valid votes		14,177	99.02	
Total rejected ballots		140	0.98	+0.98
Turnout		14,317	69.21	–3.14
Eligible voters		20,687		
Social Credit gain from United Farmers of Alberta		Swing		+37.86
Source: Elections Canada

1930 Canadian federal election
Party	Candidate	Votes	%	±%
United Farmers of Alberta	Edward Joseph Garland	5,825	55.59	–7.36
Conservative	Dawson Graham	4,653	44.41	+7.36
Total valid votes		10,478	100.00	
Total rejected ballots		unknown		
Turnout		10,478	72.35	+14.18
Eligible voters		14,483		
United Farmers of Alberta hold		Swing		–7.36
Source: Elections Canada

1926 Canadian federal election
Party	Candidate	Votes	%	±%
United Farmers of Alberta	Edward Joseph Garland	5,144	62.95	–19.90
Conservative	Acle Carman Scratch	3,028	37.05	+13.38
Total valid votes		8,172	100.00	
Total rejected ballots		unknown		
Turnout		8,172	58.16	–6.21
Eligible voters		14,050		
United Farmers of Alberta gain from Progressive		Swing		+38.17
Source: Elections Canada

1925 Canadian federal election
Party	Candidate	Votes	%	±%
Progressive	Edward Joseph Garland	3,773	43.05	–31.44
Liberal	Jesse Elmer Gouge	2,917	33.28	–
Conservative	William James Douglass	2,075	23.67	+0.54
Total valid votes		8,765	100.00	
Total rejected ballots		unknown		
Turnout		8,765	64.37	+1.77
Eligible voters		13,616		
Progressive hold		Swing		–32.36
Source: Elections Canada

1921 Canadian federal election
Party	Candidate	Votes	%	±%
Progressive	Edward Joseph Garland	11,527	74.49	–
Conservative	William Rose Fulton	3,579	23.13	–
Unknown	Herbert Adolph Wiertz	369	2.38	–
Total valid votes		15,475	100.00	
Total rejected ballots		unknown		
Turnout		15,475	62.60	–11.03
Eligible voters		24,720		
Progressive gain from Government (Unionist)		Swing		+48.81
Source: Elections Canada

1917 Canadian federal election
Party	Candidate	Votes	%	±%
Government (Unionist)	Howard Hadden Halladay	3,757	44.11	–
Opposition (Laurier Liberals)	Jesse Elmer Gouge	2,996	35.17	–
Nonpartisan League	Daniel Harcourt Galbraith	1,453	17.06	–
Labour	John Reid	312	3.66	–
Total valid votes		8,518	100.00	
Total rejected ballots		unknown		
Turnout		8,518	73.63	–
Eligible voters		11,569		
Unionist (historical) notional hold		Swing		N/A
Source: Elections Canada

== See also ==
- List of Canadian electoral districts
- Historical federal electoral districts of Canada
