= Stanley Schumacher =

Canadian politician (1933–2020)

Stanley Schumacher QC

Member of Parliament for Palliser
- In office 1968–1979
- Succeeded by: Gordon Taylor

Member of the Legislative Assembly of Alberta for Drumheller
- In office 12 June 1986 – 11 February 1997
- Preceded by: Lewis Clark
- Succeeded by: Riding abolished

Speaker of the Legislative Assembly of Alberta
- In office 1993–1997
- Preceded by: David J. Carter
- Succeeded by: Ken Kowalski

Personal details
- Born: Stanley Stanford Schumacher; 12 June 1933 Hanna, Alberta, Canada
- Died: 10 October 2020 (aged 87) Calgary, Alberta, Canada
- Party: Progressive Conservative
- Spouse: Virginia Schumacher
- Children: 2
- Profession: Barrister, lawyer

Stanley Stanford Schumacher QC (12 June 1933 – 10 October 2020) was a politician from Alberta, Canada. He was speaker of the Legislative Assembly of Alberta and a member of the House of Commons of Canada.

== Early life ==
Stanley Stanford Schumacher was born in Hanna, Alberta, to parents Louis and Gladys Schumacher on 12 June 1933. Louis Schumacher was a businessman and his mother Gladys was a school teacher. In 1968, he married Virginia Brodie whom he met in the Young Progressive Conservative Club and with whom he would have two children, Sandra and David.

Schumacher joined the Canadian Officers' Training Corps in fall 1954 and served until 1958 as a commissioned second lieutenant in the Royal Canadian Armoured Corps, including a deployment to Soest, Germany with the Royal Canadian Dragoons. Schumacher's military service ended in March 1962.

He attended school in Dorothy and Drumheller, Alberta, and went on to the University of British Columbia, where he received his Bachelor of Commerce in 1958 and Bachelor of Laws in 1959. He returned to Drumheller where he practised law.

== Federal political career ==
Schumacher first ran for the Progressive Conservative Party of Canada in the 1968 federal election and was elected to represent Palliser in Alberta. He served three terms in the House of Commons. During this time Schumacher chaired the Alberta Progressive Conservative caucus and was the secretary of the national caucus for one year.

As a result of redistribution before the 1979 federal election, the district of Palliser was abolished. Schumacher intended to seek his party's nomination in the new riding of Bow River, which included much of his old district However, party officials asked him to step aside in favour of leader Joe Clark, whose own riding of Rocky Mountain had also been abolished. Although Tory officials offered him the nomination in another riding, Schumacher refused to stand down, forcing Clark to run in Yellowhead. In Bow River, Schumacher was challenged for the nomination by former Socred Gordon Taylor, who had represented much of the new riding provincially for almost 40 years. Taylor defeated Schumacher at a controversial meeting in which Schumacher's supporters alleged that people who were not bona fide members of the party voted. Schumacher's former assistant, John Aimers, resigned from the party in January 1978 in protest, accusing the national executive of engineering Schumacher's defeat.

On 28 February 1978, Schumacher left the party and sat as an independent. In the election the following year, he ran in Bow River against Taylor and was defeated by a nearly 3-to-1 margin.

== Provincial political career ==
In the 1986 Alberta general election, Schumacher ran for the Progressive Conservative Association of Alberta in Drumheller. He was elected and was soon appointed Deputy Speaker, a position he held until 1993. Schumacher was reelected in the 1989 and 1993 general elections. He became the first elected Speaker of the Legislative Assembly after the retirement of David Carter, defeating Liberal candidate Bettie Hewes. As speaker, Schumacher never named a member and instead employed short adjournments for the purpose of restoring order. He retired from the Assembly after dissolution in 1997.

== Late life ==
After his career in the provincial legislature, he formed the Drumheller law firm Schumacher, Gough and Pedersen, and served on the Alberta Surface Rights and Land Compensation boards where he eventually became Chairman in 2001.

In November 2012, Schumacher received the Queen Elizabeth II Diamond Jubilee Medal in recognition for his public service contributions to Albertans and Canadians over the past more than 45 years. Earlier he had received the Silver and Golden Jubilee Medals.

Schumacher died 10 October 2020, aged 87, from complications of dementia.

Parliament of Canada
Preceded by New District	Member of Parliament Palliser; 1968-1979	Succeeded by District Abolished
Legislative Assembly of Alberta
Preceded by Lewis Clark	MLA Drumheller; 1986-1997	Succeeded by District Abolished
Preceded by David J. Carter	Speaker of the Alberta Legislative Assembly; 1993-1997	Succeeded by Ken Kowalski
