= Al Johnson (politician) =

Canadian politician

Al Johnson (born 13 April 1939) is a former Canadian politician, professional geologist, and exploration manager. Johnson was a Progressive Conservative member of the House of Commons of Canada.

Born in Montreal, Quebec, Johnson moved to Calgary, Alberta and represented the riding of Calgary North, which he won in the 1988 federal election. He served in the 34th Canadian Parliament as a backbench supporter of Prime Minister Brian Mulroney's government and briefly that of Kim Campbell. He left politics after he lost his seat to Diane Ablonczy of the Reform Party in 1993.

Parliament of Canada
Preceded by Paul Gagnon	Member of Parliament Calgary North; 1988–1993	Succeeded by Diane Ablonczy
