= Calgary Bowness =

Defunct provincial electoral district in Alberta, Canada

Coordinates: 51.09°N 114.20°W

Alberta electoral district

Defunct provincial electoral district
- Legislature: Legislative Assembly of Alberta
- District created: 1957
- District abolished: 1971
- First contested: 1959
- Last contested: 1967

Calgary Bowness was a provincial electoral district in Alberta, Canada, mandated to return a single member to the Legislative Assembly of Alberta using the first past the post method of voting from 1959 to 1971.

== District history ==
=== Boundary history ===
Calgary Bowness 1957 boundaries
Bordering districts
North	East	West	South
Banff-Cochrane	Calgary North	Banff-Cochrane	Calgary West, Calgary Centre
Legal description from the Statutes of Alberta 1957, An Act to amend The Legislative Assembly Act.
riding map goes here		map in relation to other districts in Calgary goes here	
"Electoral Division of Calgary Bowness, the boundary whereof is as follows: Commencing at the north-east corner of section 8, township 25, range 1, west of the fifth meridian; thence southerly along the east boundaries of sections 8 and 5 in the said township and along the west limit of Fourteenth Street North West in the City of Calgary to the left bank of the Bow River; thence in a generally westerly direction along the said left bank to the east boundary of the west half of section 24, township 24, range 2, west of the fifth meridian thence southerly along the east boundaries of the west halves of sections 24 and 13 in township 24, range 2 west of the fifth meridian, to the centre line of the Old Banff Coach Road as shown on a plan record in the Land Titles Office for the South Alberta Land Registration District as Plan 1288 I; thence in a generally westerly direction along the said centre line to the meridian between ranges 2 and 3, west of the fifth meridian; thence northerly along the meridian between ranges 2 and 3, west of the fifth meridian to the north-east corner of section 12, township 25 range 3, west of the fifth meridian; thence easterly along the north boundaries of sections 7 to 12 inclusive, township 25, range 2, west of the fifth meridian, and of sections 7 and 8, township 25, range 1, west of the fifth meridian to the point of commencement.
Note: Boundaries came into force in 1959.

Calgary Bowness 1961 boundaries
Bordering districts
North	East	West	South
Banff-Cochrane	Calgary Queens Park	Banff-Cochrane	Calgary West, Calgary Centre
Legal description from the Statutes of Alberta 1961, An Act to amend The Legislative Assembly Act and the Election Act.
riding map goes here		map in relation to other districts in Calgary goes here	
"Electoral Division of Calgary Bowness, the boundary whereof is as follows: Commencing at the north-east corner of section 8, township 25, range 1, west of the 5th meridian; thence southerly along the east boundary of sections 8 and 5, township 25, range 1, west of the 5th and along the east boundary of section 32, township 24 range 1, west of the 5th meridian to its intersection with the westerly production of the centre line of Holland Street; thence easterly along the said production to the centre line of 14th street north west; thence southerly along the said line to the centre line of 16th Avenue north west; thence westerly along the said centre line to the centre lineof 24th street north west; thence southerly along the said centre line and its southerly production to the right bank of the Bow River; thence upstream along the said right bank to its intersection with the centre line of the Trans-Canada Highway; thence in a general north-westerly and westerly direction along the said centre line to the east boundary of range 3, west of the 5th meridian; thence northerly along the said east boundary to the north-east corner of section 12, township 25, range 3, west of the 5th meridian; thence easterly along the north boundary of sections 7 to 12 in township 25 range 2, west of the 5th meridian and along the north boundary of sections 7 and 8 in township 25, range 1, west of the 5th meridian to the point of commencement.
Note: Boundaries remained in force until the district was abolished in 1971.

Members of the Legislative Assembly for Calgary Bowness
Assembly	Years	Member	Party
See Calgary electoral district from 1921-1959
14th	1959-1963	Charles Johnston	Social Credit
15th	1963-1967	Charles Johnston	Social Credit
16th	1967-1971	Len Werry	Progressive Conservative
See Calgary-Foothills and Calgary-Bow 1971-present

=== 1959 redistribution ===
The Alberta government decided to return to using the first past the post system of voting from Single Transferable Vote for the 1959 general election. The province redistributed the Calgary and Edmonton super riding's and standardized the voting system across the province into single member districts.

Calgary Bowness was one of the six electoral districts created from the Calgary super riding that year. The others were Calgary Glenmore, Calgary Centre, Calgary West, Calgary North, Calgary North East, Calgary South East.

The district was named after the community of Bowness, and during its time encompassed the Northwestern part of the city.

=== Electoral history ===
The district was first won easily by former Social Credit federal Member of Parliament Charles Johnston in 1959. He was re-elected for his second term in 1963 defeating future Calgary city Alderman Peter Petrasuk in a hotly contested race.

The last of the three elections held in the electoral district would see Len Werry pick up the district for the Progressive Conservatives in the 1967 election. Johnston went down to defeat by less than 400 votes. Johnston retired. He did not return to politics before his death in 1971.

In 1971 the Calgary Bowness electoral district was abolished and re-distributed between the Calgary-Bow and Calgary-Foothills electoral districts.

== Election results ==
=== 1959 ===
1959 Alberta general election
Party	Candidate	Votes	%	±%
Social Credit	Charles Edward Johnston	6,681	59.27%	–
Progressive Conservative	Bruce Norris	3,194	28.34%	–
Liberal	Evelyn Leew	1,018	9.03%	–
Co-operative Commonwealth	Kay Halliday Grose	379	3.36%	–
Total		11,272	–	–
Rejected, spoiled and declined		35	–	–
Eligible electors / turnout		21,047	53.72%	–
Social Credit pickup new district.				
Source(s) Source: "Calgary-Bowness Official Results 1959 Alberta general election". Alberta Heritage Community Foundation.

=== 1963 ===
1963 Alberta general election
Party	Candidate	Votes	%	±%
Social Credit	Charles Edward Johnston	5,355	52.17%	-7.10%
Liberal	Peter Petrasuk	2,456	23.93%	14.89%
Progressive Conservative	Albert A. Frawley	1,719	16.75%	-11.59%
New Democratic	Everett C. Baldwin	735	7.16%	–
Total		10,265	–	–
Rejected, spoiled and declined		11	–	–
Eligible electors / turnout		19,675	52.23%	-1.49%
Social Credit hold		Swing		-1.35%
Source(s) Source: "Calgary-Bowness Official Results 1963 Alberta general election". Alberta Heritage Community Foundation.

=== 1967 ===
1967 Alberta general election
Party	Candidate	Votes	%	±%
Progressive Conservative	Len F. Werry	6,828	40.00%	23.25%
Social Credit	Charles Edward Johnston	6,461	37.85%	-14.32%
New Democratic	Evelyn Moore	1,905	11.16%	4.00%
Liberal	John Donachie	1,876	10.99%	-12.94%
Total		17,070	–	–
Rejected, spoiled and declined		100	–	–
Eligible electors / turnout		26,302	65.28%	13.05%
Progressive Conservative gain from Social Credit		Swing		-13.05%
Source(s) Source: "Calgary-Bowness Official Results 1967 Alberta general election". Alberta Heritage Community Foundation.

== See also ==
- List of Alberta provincial electoral districts
- Canadian provincial electoral districts
