= Paul Gagnon (politician) =

Canadian politician

Paul Gagnon (born 17 September 1937) was a Progressive Conservative member of the House of Commons of Canada.

Born in Moose Jaw, Saskatchewan, Gagnon was an engineer and geologist by career. Gagnon was elected at the Calgary North electoral district in the 1984 federal election, thus serving as a backbench supporter of Prime Minister Brian Mulroney's government in the 33rd Canadian Parliament. He left federal politics after this term and did not campaign in the 1988 federal election.

Parliament of Canada
Preceded by Frederick Wright	Member of Parliament Calgary North; 1984–1988	Succeeded by Al Johnson
