= Calgary North =

Former federal electoral district in Alberta, Canada

Alberta electoral district

Defunct federal electoral district
- Legislature: House of Commons
- District created: 1953
- District abolished: 1997
- First contested: 1952
- Last contested: 1993

Calgary North was a federal electoral district in Alberta, Canada, that was represented in the House of Commons of Canada from 1953 to 1997. This riding was created in 1952 from parts of the Bow River, Calgary West, and East Calgary ridings.

The electoral district was abolished in 1996 when it was merged into Calgary—Nose Hill.

== Historical Boundaries ==
1954 representation order

1966 representation order

1976 representation order

1987 representation order

== Members of Parliament ==
Calgary North
| Parliament | Years | Member | Party |
|---|---|---|---|
Riding created from Calgary West, Bow River and Calgary East
| 22nd | 1953–1957 | Douglas Harkness | Progressive Conservative |
| 23rd | 1957–1958 | Douglas Harkness | Progressive Conservative |
| 24th | 1958–1962 | Douglas Harkness | Progressive Conservative |
| 25th | 1962–1963 | Douglas Harkness | Progressive Conservative |
| 26th | 1963–1965 | Douglas Harkness | Progressive Conservative |
| 27th | 1965–1968 | Douglas Harkness | Progressive Conservative |
| 28th | 1968–1972 | Eldon Woolliams | Progressive Conservative |
| 29th | 1972–1974 | Eldon Woolliams | Progressive Conservative |
| 30th | 1974–1979 | Eldon Woolliams | Progressive Conservative |
| 31st | 1979–1980 | Eldon Woolliams | Progressive Conservative |
| 32nd | 1980–1984 | Frederick Wright | Progressive Conservative |
| 33rd | 1984–1988 | Paul Gagnon | Progressive Conservative |
| 34th | 1988–1993 | Al Johnson | Progressive Conservative |
| 35th | 1993–1997 | Diane Ablonczy | Reform |
Riding dissolved into Calgary Nose Hill

== Election results ==
=== 1993 ===
1993 Canadian federal election
| Party | Candidate | Votes | % | ±% |
|---|---|---|---|---|
| Reform | Diane Ablonczy | 35,508 | 52.45 | +36.23 |
| Liberal | James Maxim | 17,899 | 26.44 | +13.44 |
| Progressive Conservative | Al Johnson | 10,424 | 15.40 | –42.34 |
| New Democratic | Andrea Garnier | 1,592 | 2.35 | –10.15 |
| National | Mike Schubert | 1,361 | 2.01 | – |
| Green | Michael Alvarez-Toye | 343 | 0.51 | – |
| Natural Law | Bruce Hansen | 308 | 0.45 | – |
| Independent | Robert McCallum | 268 | 0.40 | – |
| Total valid votes | | 67,703 | 99.79 | |
| Total rejected ballots | | 145 | 0.21 | –0.03 |
| Turnout | | 67,848 | 68.82 | –9.73 |
| Eligible voters | | 98,589 | | |
| Reform gain from Progressive Conservative | | Swing | | +24.84 |
Source: Library of Parliament

=== 1988 ===
1988 Canadian federal election
| Party | Candidate | Votes | % | ±% |
|---|---|---|---|---|
| Progressive Conservative | Al Johnson | 35,212 | 57.74 | –15.05 |
| Reform | Murray Smith | 9,889 | 16.22 | – |
| Liberal | Jim Bennett | 7,925 | 13.00 | +0.26 |
| New Democratic | Tom Schepens | 7,626 | 12.50 | –0.55 |
| Libertarian | Elizabeth A. Anderson | 219 | 0.36 | – |
| Confederation of Regions | Andrew Michael Gustafsson | 113 | 0.19 | – |
| Total valid votes | | 60,984 | 99.75 | |
| Total rejected ballots | | 150 | 0.25 | –0.06 |
| Turnout | | 61,134 | 78.55 | +4.76 |
| Eligible voters | | 77,825 | | |
| Progressive Conservative hold | | Swing | | –15.64 |
Source: Library of Parliament

=== 1984 ===
1984 Canadian federal election
| Party | Candidate | Votes | % | ±% |
|---|---|---|---|---|
| Progressive Conservative | Paul Gagnon | 39,207 | 72.79 | +9.37 |
| New Democratic | Pam Appleton | 7,027 | 13.05 | +5.35 |
| Liberal | Darryl Raymaker | 6,864 | 12.74 | –13.13 |
| Independent | Peter Hope | 765 | 1.42 | – |
| Total valid votes | | 53,863 | 99.70 | |
| Total rejected ballots | | 163 | 0.30 | +0.11 |
| Turnout | | 54,026 | 73.79 | +8.26 |
| Eligible voters | | 73,213 | | |
| Progressive Conservative hold | | Swing | | +7.36 |
Source: Library of Parliament

=== 1980 ===
1980 Canadian federal election
| Party | Candidate | Votes | % | ±% |
|---|---|---|---|---|
| Progressive Conservative | Frederick Wright | 26,201 | 63.42 | –0.84 |
| Liberal | Darryl Raymaker | 10,689 | 25.87 | +1.09 |
| New Democratic | Dave H. Hammond | 3,180 | 7.70 | –2.00 |
| Rhinoceros | Mike Williams | 878 | 2.13 | – |
| Social Credit | Rod Start | 318 | 0.77 | –0.50 |
| Marxist–Leninist | Bill Kalturnyk | 46 | 0.11 | – |
| Total valid votes | | 41,312 | 99.81 | |
| Total rejected ballots | | 79 | 0.19 | –0.06 |
| Turnout | | 41,391 | 65.54 | –7.75 |
| Eligible voters | | 63,158 | | |
| Progressive Conservative hold | | Swing | | –0.97 |
Source: Library of Parliament

=== 1979 ===
1979 Canadian federal election
| Party | Candidate | Votes | % | ±% |
|---|---|---|---|---|
| Progressive Conservative | Eldon Woolliams | 27,994 | 64.26 | –0.44 |
| Liberal | Darryl Raymaker | 10,794 | 24.78 | +1.68 |
| New Democratic | Norm Herman | 4,227 | 9.70 | +0.41 |
| Social Credit | Stewart Hodgkinson | 552 | 1.27 | –1.64 |
| Total valid votes | | 43,567 | 99.75 | |
| Total rejected ballots | | 108 | 0.25 | –0.09 |
| Turnout | | 43,675 | 73.29 | +4.19 |
| Eligible voters | | 59,593 | | |
| Progressive Conservative hold | | Swing | | –1.06 |
Source: Library of Parliament

=== 1974 ===
1974 Canadian federal election
| Party | Candidate | Votes | % | ±% |
|---|---|---|---|---|
| Progressive Conservative | Eldon Woolliams | 30,175 | 64.70 | +5.47 |
| Liberal | John Sutherland | 10,773 | 23.10 | –1.08 |
| New Democratic | Floyd Albin Johnson | 4,332 | 9.29 | –3.39 |
| Social Credit | Dale Schlenker | 1,358 | 2.91 | –0.63 |
| Total valid votes | | 46,638 | 99.66 | |
| Total rejected ballots | | 158 | 0.34 | –0.95 |
| Turnout | | 46,796 | 69.10 | –8.07 |
| Eligible voters | | 67,720 | | |
| Progressive Conservative hold | | Swing | | +3.28 |
Source: Library of Parliament

=== 1972 ===
1972 Canadian federal election
| Party | Candidate | Votes | % | ±% |
|---|---|---|---|---|
| Progressive Conservative | Eldon Woolliams | 30,973 | 59.23 | +9.37 |
| Liberal | Roland-Aimé Lambert | 12,647 | 24.18 | –17.59 |
| New Democratic | Barry Pashak | 6,630 | 12.68 | +4.30 |
| Social Credit | A. Geoffrey Dawrant | 1,851 | 3.54 | – |
| Independent | John J. Jasienczyk | 192 | 0.37 | – |
| Total valid votes | | 52,293 | 98.71 | |
| Total rejected ballots | | 681 | 1.29 | +0.85 |
| Turnout | | 52,974 | 77.17 | +1.77 |
| Eligible voters | | 68,647 | | |
| Progressive Conservative hold | | Swing | | +13.48 |
Source: Library of Parliament

=== 1968 ===
1968 Canadian federal election
| Party | Candidate | Votes | % | ±% |
|---|---|---|---|---|
| Progressive Conservative | Eldon Woolliams | 21,708 | 49.86 | +6.56 |
| Liberal | Peter Petrasuk | 18,185 | 41.77 | +12.62 |
| New Democratic | Ted Takacs | 3,648 | 8.38 | –1.46 |
| Total valid votes | | 43,541 | 99.56 | |
| Total rejected ballots | | 192 | 0.44 | –0.18 |
| Turnout | | 43,733 | 75.39 | +3.79 |
| Eligible voters | | 58,006 | | |
| Progressive Conservative hold | | Swing | | +9.59 |
Source: Library of Parliament

=== 1965 ===
1965 Canadian federal election
| Party | Candidate | Votes | % | ±% |
|---|---|---|---|---|
| Progressive Conservative | Douglas Harkness | 23,810 | 43.30 | +4.63 |
| Liberal | Adrian Douglas Berry | 16,029 | 29.15 | +3.35 |
| Social Credit | Nelson Weston | 9,742 | 17.71 | –9.38 |
| New Democratic | Ian Adam | 5,412 | 9.84 | +1.40 |
| Total valid votes | | 54,993 | 99.38 | |
| Total rejected ballots | | 342 | 0.62 | +0.20 |
| Turnout | | 55,335 | 71.60 | –6.86 |
| Eligible voters | | 77,284 | | |
| Progressive Conservative hold | | Swing | | +3.99 |
Source: Library of Parliament

=== 1963 ===
1963 Canadian federal election
| Party | Candidate | Votes | % | ±% |
|---|---|---|---|---|
| Progressive Conservative | Douglas Harkness | 21,966 | 38.67 | –5.85 |
| Social Credit | Robert A. Simpson | 15,386 | 27.09 | +1.02 |
| Liberal | Marion Albert Law | 14,653 | 25.80 | +6.13 |
| New Democratic | Everett C. Baldwin | 4,792 | 8.44 | –1.30 |
| Total valid votes | | 56,797 | 99.58 | |
| Total rejected ballots | | 241 | 0.42 | –0.28 |
| Turnout | | 57,038 | 78.46 | +6.43 |
| Eligible voters | | 72,693 | | |
| Progressive Conservative hold | | Swing | | –3.44 |
Source: Library of Parliament

=== 1962 ===
1962 Canadian federal election
| Party | Candidate | Votes | % | ±% |
|---|---|---|---|---|
| Progressive Conservative | Douglas Harkness | 22,446 | 44.52 | –27.43 |
| Social Credit | Robert A. Simpson | 13,143 | 26.07 | +13.31 |
| Liberal | Harry Slater Rowbotham | 9,919 | 19.67 | +9.07 |
| New Democratic | Harry Pope | 4,910 | 9.74 | +5.05 |
| Total valid votes | | 50,418 | 99.29 | |
| Total rejected ballots | | 359 | 0.71 | –0.17 |
| Turnout | | 50,777 | 72.03 | –0.70 |
| Eligible voters | | 70,492 | | |
| Progressive Conservative hold | | Swing | | –20.37 |
Source: Library of Parliament

=== 1958 ===
1958 Canadian federal election
| Party | Candidate | Votes | % | ±% |
|---|---|---|---|---|
| Progressive Conservative | Douglas Harkness | 30,930 | 71.95 | +17.25 |
| Social Credit | Lee Leavitt | 5,484 | 12.76 | –12.52 |
| Liberal | D. Austin Lane | 4,555 | 10.60 | –5.54 |
| Co-operative Commonwealth | George Edwin Ellinson | 2,018 | 4.69 | +0.81 |
| Total valid votes | | 42,987 | 99.12 | |
| Total rejected ballots | | 380 | 0.88 | –0.29 |
| Turnout | | 43,367 | 72.73 | +1.89 |
| Eligible voters | | 59,626 | | |
| Progressive Conservative hold | | Swing | | +14.89 |
Source: Library of Parliament

=== 1957 ===
1957 Canadian federal election
| Party | Candidate | Votes | % | ±% |
|---|---|---|---|---|
| Progressive Conservative | Douglas Harkness | 21,783 | 54.70 | +17.39 |
| Social Credit | Ian Smith | 10,066 | 25.28 | –2.84 |
| Liberal | Una MacLean-Evans | 6,429 | 16.14 | –11.64 |
| Co-operative Commonwealth | Harold Emory Bronson | 1,545 | 3.88 | –1.47 |
| Total valid votes | | 39,823 | 98.83 | |
| Total rejected ballots | | 472 | 1.17 | –0.01 |
| Turnout | | 40,295 | 70.84 | +7.95 |
| Eligible voters | | 56,884 | | |
| Progressive Conservative hold | | Swing | | +10.12 |
Source: Library of Parliament

=== 1953 ===
1953 Canadian federal election
| Party | Candidate | Votes | % | ±% |
|---|---|---|---|---|
| Progressive Conservative | Douglas Harkness | 11,002 | 37.31 | – |
| Social Credit | Clifford Menzies Willmott | 8,293 | 28.12 | – |
| Liberal | Harold William Riley | 8,191 | 27.78 | – |
| Co-operative Commonwealth | Herbert James Ryan | 1,578 | 5.35 | – |
| Labor–Progressive | David Wittig | 426 | 1.44 | – |
| Total valid votes | | 29,490 | 98.82 | |
| Total rejected ballots | | 351 | 1.18 | – |
| Turnout | | 29,841 | 62.89 | – |
| Eligible voters | | 47,448 | | |
| Progressive Conservative hold | | Swing | | N/A |
Source: Library of Parliament

== See also ==
- List of Canadian electoral districts
- Historical federal electoral districts of Canada
