= Canadian federal election results in rural Alberta =

Electoral history
Year	Results
2019	
2015	
2011	
2008	
2006	
2004	
2000	
1997	
1993	
1988	
1984	
1980	
1979	
1974	
1972	
1968	
1965	
1963	
1962	
1958	
1957	
1953	
1949	
1945	
1940	
1930	
1926	
1925	

This article shows results of Canadian federal elections in the province of Alberta outside the Calgary and Edmonton areas.

== Regional profile ==
Rural Alberta is the most conservative region in Canada often leaning toward populist politics. For most of the last 80 years, the major right-wing party of the day has won all or most of the ridings here, often by large margins. The evangelical Social Credit Party was founded in rural Alberta, and for many years was either the first or second party in much of the region. The Progressive Conservative Party swept every riding here from 1972 to 1993. Rural Alberta was the power base for the Reform and Canadian Alliance parties from 1993 to 2000. The Conservative Party of Canada then won every riding in this region by large margins, making rural Alberta the least competitive region in the country. Some ridings in this area had been friendly to Red Tories, but since the 1990s the entire region has turned in a more fiscal and social conservative direction. For example, former prime minister Joe Clark represented the riding of Yellowhead (and its predecessor, Rocky Mountain) from 1972 to 1993 during his first tenure in parliament, but ran in (and won) the comparatively less conservative seat of Calgary Centre during his comeback to politics in 2000.

Much of this area has not been represented by a centre-left MP in recent memory; for instance, Lethbridge has been represented solely by right-wing MPs since 1930. The Liberals have been completely shut out from rural Alberta since 1972. As evidence of the antipathy much of the region has for the Liberals, Jack Horner crossed the floor in 1977 to join the Liberals, only to be soundly defeated when he ran for reelection in Crowfoot as a Liberal in 1979, losing almost three-fourths of his vote from 1974. He was also resoundingly defeated when he tried to regain the riding in 1980. Increasing political polarization has seen Liberals draw their lowest percentage of votes here in recent years, rarely obtaining more than 20 percent of the vote, and in some ridings (Crowfoot and Yellowhead) they have attracted less than 3 percent.

The New Democratic Party has also had poor results. The Green Party finished second ahead of the NDP in the Wild Rose riding in 2006. The NDP surged in 2011 across Alberta, including Wild Rose. In 2011 the NDP finished second in all of the rural Alberta ridings.

As a measure of how deeply conservative rural Alberta is, the Conservatives retained all their seats there in 2015 when the party was heavily defeated nationally. They took every riding with 60 percent or more of the vote, with centre-left parties only managing to exceed the 20 percent mark in three ridings. However, support for the Conservatives was not universal; in all but three ridings, the NDP and Liberals collectively obtained 20 percent, sometimes reaching past 30 percent.

Social scientist Clark Banack describes a "triple alienation" in rural Alberta, formed of the regional sense of Western isolation born from frustrations around federal support, alienation as 'ordinary people' in a rapidly changing province, and a specific 'rural alienation' from urbanites "in terms of lifestyle, values and work ethic". Sociologist Sam Reimer surveyed Albertans and found that those in rural areas had a strong tendency toward anti-immigration views, regardless of religious affiliation. Political scientist Nelson Wiseman wrote that early American settlers (from the Midwest and Great Plains states) to Alberta shaped its politics with the concept of "Alberta's exceptionalism", giving a strong base to conservative parties, receptiveness to neoliberalism, and strongly resisting federal intrusion.

=== Votes by party throughout time ===
Vote share by party

Liberal
Conservative
New Democratic
Green
People's
Progressive Conservative (defunct)
Social Credit (defunct)
Reform (defunct)
Alliance (defunct)

== 2015 ==
Electoral district	Candidates						Incumbent
Electoral district	Conservative	NDP	Liberal	Green	Libertarian	Other	Incumbent
Banff—Airdrie	Blake Richards; 42,228; 63.37%	Joanne Boissonneault; 4,521; 6.78%	Marlo Raynolds; 17,380; 26.08%	Mike MacDonald; 2,509; 3.77%			Blake Richards; Wild Rose
Battle River—Crowfoot	Kevin Sorenson; 47,552; 80.91%	Katherine Swampy; 3,844; 6.54%	Andy Kowalski; 5,505; 9.37%	Gary Kelly; 1,868; 3.18%			Kevin Sorenson; Crowfoot
Bow River	Martin Shields; 38,701; 77.42%	Lynn MacWilliam; 2,622; 5.25%	William MacDonald Alexander; 6,840; 13.68%	Rita Ann Fromholt; 919; 1.84%		Fahed Khalid (DAPC); 83 0.17%	New District
Bow River	Martin Shields; 38,701; 77.42%	Lynn MacWilliam; 2,622; 5.25%	William MacDonald Alexander; 6,840; 13.68%	Rita Ann Fromholt; 919; 1.84%		Andrew Kucy (Ind.); 543 1.09%	New District
Bow River	Martin Shields; 38,701; 77.42%	Lynn MacWilliam; 2,622; 5.25%	William MacDonald Alexander; 6,840; 13.68%	Rita Ann Fromholt; 919; 1.84%		Frans VandeStroet (CHP); 280 0.56%	New District
Foothills	John Barlow; 46,166; 75.70%	Alison Thompson; 3,919; 6.43%	Tanya MacPherson; 8,149; 13.36%	Romy S. Tittel; 1,983; 3.25%	Cory Morgan; 424; 0.70%	Marc Slingerland (CHP); 345; 0.57%	John Barlow; Macleod
Fort McMurray—Cold Lake	David Yurdiga; 28,625; 60.56%	Melody Lepine; 3,663; 7.75%	Kyle Harrietha; 13,403; 28.36%	Brian Deheer; 743; 1.57%	Scott Berry; 552; 1.17%	Roelof Janssen (CHP); 280; 0.59%	David Yurdiga; Fort McMurray—Athabasca
Grande Prairie-Mackenzie	Chris Warkentin; 38,895; 72.91%	Saba Mossagizi; 4,343; 8.14%	Reagan Johnston; 7,819; 14.66%	James David Friesen; 1,673; 3.14%	Dylan Thompson; 613; 1.15%		Chris Warkentin; Peace River
Lakeland	Shannon Stubbs; 39,882; 72.81%	Duane Zaraska; 5,513; 10.06%	Garry Parenteau; 7,500; 13.69%	Danielle Montgomery; 1,283; 2.34%	Robert George McFadzean; 601; 1.10%		Leon Benoit†; Vegreville—Wainwright
Lakeland	Shannon Stubbs; 39,882; 72.81%	Duane Zaraska; 5,513; 10.06%	Garry Parenteau; 7,500; 13.69%	Danielle Montgomery; 1,283; 2.34%	Robert George McFadzean; 601; 1.10%		Merged District
Lakeland	Shannon Stubbs; 39,882; 72.81%	Duane Zaraska; 5,513; 10.06%	Garry Parenteau; 7,500; 13.69%	Danielle Montgomery; 1,283; 2.34%	Robert George McFadzean; 601; 1.10%		Brian Storseth†; Westlock—St. Paul
Lethbridge	Rachael Harder; 32,321; 56.76%	Cheryl Meheden; 11,674; 20.50%	Mike Pyne; 10,532; 18.50%	Kas MacMillan; 1,461; 2.57%		Geoffrey Capp (CHP); 746 1.31%	Jim Hillyer‡
Lethbridge	Rachael Harder; 32,321; 56.76%	Cheryl Meheden; 11,674; 20.50%	Mike Pyne; 10,532; 18.50%	Kas MacMillan; 1,461; 2.57%		Solly Krygier-Paine (Rhino.); 209 0.37%	Jim Hillyer‡
Medicine Hat— Cardston—Warner	Jim Hillyer; 34,849; 68.80%	Erin Weir; 4,897; 9.67%	Glen Allan; 9,085; 17.94%	Brent Smith; 1,319; 2.60%		John Clayton Turner (Ind.); 500; 0.99%	LaVar Payne†; Medicine Hat
Peace River—Westlock	Arnold Viersen; 34,342; 69.35%	Cameron Alexis; 7,127; 14.39%	Chris Brown; 6,360; 12.84%	Sabrina Lee Levac; 1,247; 2.52%	Jeremy Sergeew; 443; 0.89%		New District
Red Deer—Lacombe	Blaine Calkins; 43,599; 70.71%	Doug Hart; 7,055; 11.44%	Jeff Rock; 9,235; 14.98%	Les Kuzyk; 1,773; 2.88%			Blaine Calkins; Wetaskiwin
Red Deer—Mountain View	Earl Dreeshen; 46,245; 74.33%	Paul Harris; 5,233; 8.41%	Chandra Lescia Kastern; 8,356; 13.43%	Simon Oleny; 1,621; 2.61%	James Walper; 445; 0.72%	Scott Milne (Pirate); 312; 0.50%	Earl Dreeshen; Red Deer
Yellowhead	Jim Eglinski; 37,950; 72.25%	Ken Kuzminski; 4,753; 9.05%	Ryan Maguhn; 7,467; 14.22%	Sandra Wolf Lange; 1,538; 2.93%	Cory Lystang; 817; 1.56%		Jim Eglinski

== 2011 ==
Electoral district	Candidates					Incumbent
Electoral district	Conservative	Liberal	NDP	Green	Other	Incumbent
Crowfoot	Kevin A Sorenson; 44,115; 83.99%	Omar Harb; 1,224; 2.33%	Ellen Parker; 4,805; 9.15%	Konrad Schellenberg; 1,711; 3.26%	Gerard Groenendijk (CHP); 204 0.39%	Kevin Sorenson
Crowfoot	Kevin A Sorenson; 44,115; 83.99%	Omar Harb; 1,224; 2.33%	Ellen Parker; 4,805; 9.15%	Konrad Schellenberg; 1,711; 3.26%	John C. Turner (Ind.); 463 0.88%	Kevin Sorenson
Fort McMurray—Athabasca	Brian Jean; 21,988; 71.84%	Karen Young; 3,190; 10.42%	Berend Wilting; 4,053; 13.24%	Jule Asterisk; 1,374; 4.49%		Brian Jean
Lethbridge	Jim Hillyer; 27,173; 56.51%	Michael Cormican; 4,030; 8.38%	Mark Sandilands; 13,072; 27.18%	Cailin Bartlett; 2,095; 4.36%	Geoffrey Capp (CHP); 1,716; 3.57%	Rick Casson†
Macleod	Ted Menzies; 40,007; 77.48%	Nicole Hankel; 1,898; 3.68	Janine Giles; 5,335; 10.33%	Attila Nagy; 2,389; 4.63%	Brad Carrigan (PC); 1,754 3.40%	Ted Menzies
Macleod	Ted Menzies; 40,007; 77.48%	Nicole Hankel; 1,898; 3.68	Janine Giles; 5,335; 10.33%	Attila Nagy; 2,389; 4.63%	Marc Slingerland (CHP); 252 0.49%	Ted Menzies
Medicine Hat	LaVar Payne; 30,719; 71.55%	Norm Boucher; 4,416; 10.29%	Dennis Perrier; 5,616; 13.08%	Graham Murray; 1,868; 4.35%	Frans VandeStroet (CHP); 317; 0.74%	LaVar Payne
Peace River	Chris Warkentin; 36,334; 75.76%	Corina Ganton; 1,481; 3.09%	Jennifer Villeburn; 7,740; 16.14%	Wayne John Kamieniecki; 1,702; 3.55%	Donovan Eckstrom (Rhino); 345 0.72%	Chris Warkentin
Peace River	Chris Warkentin; 36,334; 75.76%	Corina Ganton; 1,481; 3.09%	Jennifer Villeburn; 7,740; 16.14%	Wayne John Kamieniecki; 1,702; 3.55%	Russ Toews (Ind.); 359 0.75%	Chris Warkentin
Red Deer	Earl Dreeshen; 37,959; 75.93%	Andrew Lineker; 1,918; 3.84%	Stuart Somerville; 7,566; 15.13%	Mason Connor Woodruff Sisson; 2,551; 5.10%		Earl Dreeshen
Vegreville—Wainwright	Leon Benoit; 39,145; 79.79%	Ron Williams; 1,525; 3.11%	Ray A Stone; 5,561; 11.34%	William Munsey; 2,499; 5.09%	Matthew Sokalski (CHP); 327; 0.67%	Leon Benoit
Westlock—St. Paul	Brian Storseth; 32,652; 77.82%	Rob Fox; 2,569; 6.12%	Lyndsey Ellen Henderson; 5,103; 12.16%	Lisa Grant; 1,634; 3.89%		Brian Storseth
Wetaskiwin	Blaine Calkins; 37,756; 81.44%	Christopher Anderson; 1,348; 2.91%	Tim Robson; 5,281; 11.39%	Robert Johnston; 1,978; 4.27%		Blaine Calkins
Wild Rose	Blake Richards; 43,669; 74.74%	John Douglas Reilly; 3,908; 6.69%	Jeff Horvath; 6,595; 11.29%	Mike MacDonald; 4,071; 6.97%	Randy Vanden Broek (CHP); 181; 0.31%	Blake Richards
Yellowhead	Rob Merrifield; 31,925; 77.03%	Zack Siezmagraff; 1,190; 2.87%	Mark Wells; 5,411; 13.06%	Monika Schaefer; 2,122; 5.14%	Melissa Brade (CAP); 384 0.93%	Rob Merrifield
Yellowhead	Rob Merrifield; 31,925; 77.03%	Zack Siezmagraff; 1,190; 2.87%	Mark Wells; 5,411; 13.06%	Monika Schaefer; 2,122; 5.14%	Jacob Strydhorst (CHP); 404 0.97%	Rob Merrifield

== 2008 ==
Electoral district	Candidates						Incumbent
Electoral district	Conservative	Liberal	NDP	Green	Christian Heritage	Other	Incumbent
Crowfoot	Kevin Sorenson; 39,342; 82.03%	Sharon L. Howe; 1,958; 4.08%	Ellen Parker; 3,783; 7.89%	Kaitlin Kettenbach; 2,875; 5.99%			Kevin Sorenson
Fort McMurray—Athabasca	Brian Jean; 17,160; 67.12%	John Webb; 2,710; 10.60%	Mark Voyageur; 3,300; 12.91%	Dylan Richards; 1,628; 6.37%	Jacob Strydhorst; 186; 0.73%	John Malcolm (FPNP); 233 0.91%	Brian Jean
Fort McMurray—Athabasca	Brian Jean; 17,160; 67.12%	John Webb; 2,710; 10.60%	Mark Voyageur; 3,300; 12.91%	Dylan Richards; 1,628; 6.37%	Jacob Strydhorst; 186; 0.73%	Shawn Reimer (Ind.); 350 1.37%	Brian Jean
Lethbridge	Rick Casson; 31,714; 66.96%	Michael Joseph Cormican; 4,404; 9.30%	Mark Sandilands; 6,733; 14.22%	Amanda Swager; 3,420; 7.22%	Geoffrey Capp; 1,094; 2.31%		Rick Casson
Macleod	Ted Menzies; 35,328; 77.36%	Isabel Paynter; 2,703; 5.92%	Stan Knowlton; 3,053; 6.69%	Jared McCollum; 4,161; 9.11%	Marc Slingerland; 422; 0.92%		Ted Menzies
Medicine Hat	LaVar Payne; 26,950; 70.87%	Bev Botter; 2,639; 6.94%	Wally Regehr; 4,187; 11.01%	Kevin Dodd; 2,338; 6.15%	Frans Vandestroet; 363; 0.95%	David S. Patrick (Ind.); 580 1.53%	Monte Solberg†
Medicine Hat	LaVar Payne; 26,950; 70.87%	Bev Botter; 2,639; 6.94%	Wally Regehr; 4,187; 11.01%	Kevin Dodd; 2,338; 6.15%	Frans Vandestroet; 363; 0.95%	Dean Shock (Ind.); 971 2.55%	Monte Solberg†
Peace River	Chris Warkentin; 29,550; 69.51%	Liliane Maisonneuve; 2,843; 6.69%	Adele Boucher Rymhs; 6,124; 14.41%	Jennifer Villebrun; 3,303; 7.77%		Edwin Siggelkow (CAP); 373 0.88%	Chris Warkentin
Peace River	Chris Warkentin; 29,550; 69.51%	Liliane Maisonneuve; 2,843; 6.69%	Adele Boucher Rymhs; 6,124; 14.41%	Jennifer Villebrun; 3,303; 7.77%		Mélanie Simard (Libert.); 316 0.74%	Chris Warkentin
Red Deer	Earl Dreeshen; 33,226; 73.24%	Garfield Marks; 2,863; 6.31%	Stuart Somerville; 5,040; 11.11%	Evan Bedford; 4,239; 9.34%			Bob Mills†
Vegreville—Wainwright	Leon Benoit; 34,493; 77.09%	Adam Campbell; 2,345; 5.24%	Ray Stone; 4,230; 9.45%	William Munsey; 3,676; 8.22%			Leon Benoit
Westlock—St. Paul	Brian Storseth; 27,338; 72.71%	Leila Houle; 3,418; 9.09%	Della Drury; 3,809; 10.13%	Aden Murphy; 2,522; 6.71%	Sip Hofstede; 510; 1.36%		Brian Storseth
Wetaskiwin	Blaine Calkins; 32,528; 77.14%	Rita Katherine Dillon; 2,362; 5.60%	Tim Robson; 3,636; 8.62%	Les Parsons; 3,395; 8.05%		Shawn Mann (CAP); 249; 0.59%	Blaine Calkins
Wild Rose	Blake Richards; 36,869; 72.92%	Jenn Turcott; 2,890; 5.72%	Jeff Horvath; 4,169; 8.24%	Lisa Fox; 6,390; 12.64%		Krista Zoobkoff (Libert.); 246; 0.49%	Myron Thompson†
Yellowhead	Rob Merrifield; 26,863; 71.85%	Mohamed El-Rafih; 1,489; 3.98%	Ken Kuzminski; 4,587; 12.27%	Monika Schaefer; 3,437; 9.19%	John M. Wierenga; 606; 1.62%	Melissa Brade (CAP); 408; 1.09%	Rob Merrifield

== 2006 ==
Electoral district	Candidates					Incumbent
Electoral district	Liberal	Conservative	NDP	Green	Other	Incumbent
Crowfoot	Adam Campbell; 2,908; 5.56%	Kevin A. Sorenson; 43,210; 82.56%	Ellen Parker; 3,875; 7.40%	Cameron Wigmore; 2,347; 4.48%		Kevin Sorenson
Fort McMurray—Athabasca	Mel H. Buffalo; 4,663; 14.78%	Brian Jean; 20,400; 64.66%	Roland Lefort; 4,602; 14.59%	Ian Hopfe; 1,547; 4.90%	John Malcolm (FPNP); 337; 1.07%	Brian Jean; Athabasca
Lethbridge	Michael Cormican; 5,859; 11.25%	Rick Casson; 35,061; 67.30%	Melanee Thomas; 7,135; 13.70%	Andrea Sheridan; 1,846; 3.54%	Howard Fosyth (Ind.); 735 1.41%	Rick Casson
Lethbridge	Michael Cormican; 5,859; 11.25%	Rick Casson; 35,061; 67.30%	Melanee Thomas; 7,135; 13.70%	Andrea Sheridan; 1,846; 3.54%	Marc Slingerland (CHP); 1,458 2.80%	Rick Casson
Macleod	Bernie Kennedy; 4,596; 9.24%	Ted Menzies; 37,534; 75.45%	Joyce Thomas; 3,251; 6.54%	Larry Ashmore; 3,075; 6.18%	Catherine Whelan Costen (CAP); 235 0.47%	Ted Menzies
Macleod	Bernie Kennedy; 4,596; 9.24%	Ted Menzies; 37,534; 75.45%	Joyce Thomas; 3,251; 6.54%	Larry Ashmore; 3,075; 6.18%	Myron Wolf Child (Ind.); 1,055 2.12%	Ted Menzies
Medicine Hat	Bev Botter; 3,737; 8.35%	Monte Solberg; 35,670; 79.71%	Wally Regehr; 3,598; 8.04%	Kevin Dodd; 1,746; 3.90%		Monte Solberg
Peace River	Tanya Mary Kappo; 4,573; 9.38%	Chris Warkentin; 27,785; 56.97%	Susan Thompson; 5,427; 11.13%	Zane Lewis; 1,102; 2.26%	Bill Given (Ind.); 9,882; 20.26%	Charlie Penson†
Red Deer	Luke Kurata; 4,636; 9.15%	Bob Mills; 38,375; 75.75%	Kelly Bickford; 5,034; 9.94%	Tanner Wade Waldo; 2,618; 5.17%		Bob Mills
Vegreville—Wainwright	Duff Stewart; 3,873; 7.57%	Leon Benoit; 37,954; 74.17%	Len Legault; 4,727; 9.24%	Brian Rozmahel; 3,822; 7.47%	Robert Peter Kratchmer (WBP); 431 0.84%	Leon Benoit
Vegreville—Wainwright	Duff Stewart; 3,873; 7.57%	Leon Benoit; 37,954; 74.17%	Len Legault; 4,727; 9.24%	Brian Rozmahel; 3,822; 7.47%	Blaine William Stephan (CHP); 364 0.71%	Leon Benoit
Westlock—St. Paul	Cory Ollikka; 6,531; 15.00%	Brian Storseth; 29,698; 68.22%	Peter Opryshko; 4,368; 10.03%	Richard De Smet; 2,136; 4.91%	Werner Gisler (Ind.); 416 0.96%	David Chatters†
Westlock—St. Paul	Cory Ollikka; 6,531; 15.00%	Brian Storseth; 29,698; 68.22%	Peter Opryshko; 4,368; 10.03%	Richard De Smet; 2,136; 4.91%	Clarence Shultz (Ind.); 381 0.88%	David Chatters†
Wetaskiwin	Peter Crossley; 4,371; 9.18%	Blaine Calkins; 35,776; 75.15%	Jim Graves; 4,441; 9.33%	Tom Lampman; 3,016; 6.34%		Dale Johnston†
Wild Rose	Judy Stewart; 5,331; 9.74%	Myron Thompson; 39,487; 72.17%	Shannon Nelles; 3,968; 7.25%	Sean Maw; 5,929; 10.84%		Myron Thompson
Yellowhead	Nancy Love; 4,066; 9.45%	Rob Merrifield; 30,640; 71.19%	Noel Lapierre; 4,712; 10.95%	Monika Schaefer; 2,856; 6.64%	John Marvin Wierenga (CHP); 765; 1.78%	Rob Merrifield

== 2004 ==
Electoral district	Candidates					Incumbent
Electoral district	Liberal	Conservative	NDP	Green	Other	Incumbent
Athabasca	Doug Faulkner; 7,158	Brian Jean; 17,942	Robert Cree; 3,115	Ian Hopfe; 1,542	814	David Chatters
Crowfoot	Adam Campbell; 3,615	Kevin Sorenson; 37,649	Ellen Parker; 3,241	Arnold Baker; 1,795	639	Kevin Sorenson
Lethbridge	Ken Nicol; 10,250	Rick Casson; 29,765	Melanee Thomas; 4,623	Erin Marie Matthews; 1,262	1,632	Rick Casson
Macleod	Chris Shade; 5,214	Ted Menzies; 32,232	Joyce Thomas; 2,802	Laurel Denise Fadeeff; 2,865		Grant Hill
Medicine Hat	Bill Cocks; 4,331	Monte Solberg; 30,241	Betty Stroh; 3,643	Kevin Dodd; 1,498		Monte Solberg
Peace River	Lyle Carlstrom; 8,200	Charlie Penson; 28,158	Susan Thompson; 4,804	Benjamin Morrison Pettit; 2,073		Charlie Penson
Red Deer	Luke Kurata; 5,294	Bob Mills; 33,510	Jeff Sloychuk; 3,500	Garfield John John Marks; 2,142	353	Bob Mills
Vegreville—Wainwright	Duff Stewart; 5,390	Leon Benoit; 33,800	Len Legault; 3,793	James Kenney; 2,976		Leon Benoit; Lakeland
Westlock—St. Paul	Joe Dion; 7,619	David Chatters; 26,433	Peggy Kirkeby; 3,480	John A. Mcdonald; 2,036		New district
Wetaskiwin	Rick Bonnett; 5,088	Dale Johnston; 31,404	Tim Robson; 3,090	Tom Lampman; 2,642	410	Dale Johnston
Wild Rose	Judy Stewart; 5,971	Myron Thompson; 33,337	Jeff Horvath; 4,009	Chris Foote; 3,904		Myron Thompson
Yellowhead	Peter Crossley; 4,441	Rob Merrifield; 26,503	Noel Lapierre; 4,429	Eric Stieglitz; 2,534	721	Rob Merrifield

=== Maps ===
1. Fort McMurray-Athabasca
2. Crowfoot
3. Lethbridge
4. Macleod
5. Medicine Hat
6. Peace River
7. Red Deer
8. Vegreville-Wainwright
9. Westlock-St. Paul
10. Wetaskiwin
11. Wild Rose
12. Yellowhead
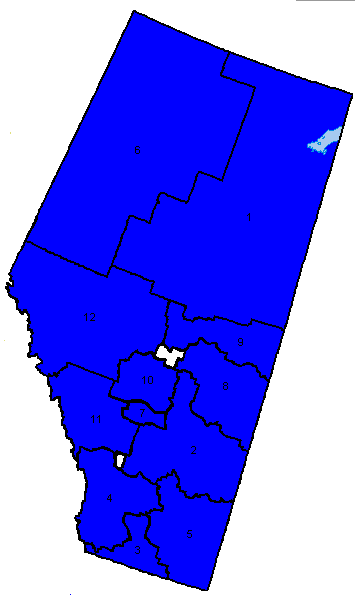
Key map

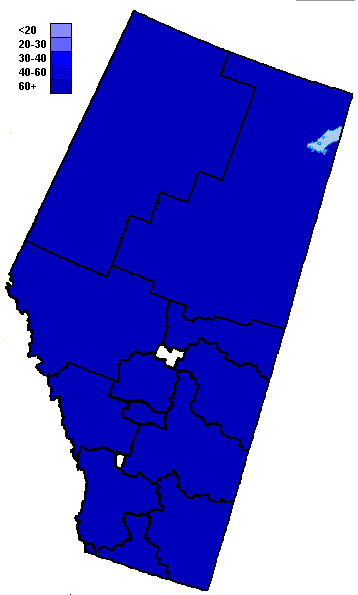
Conservative Party of Canada

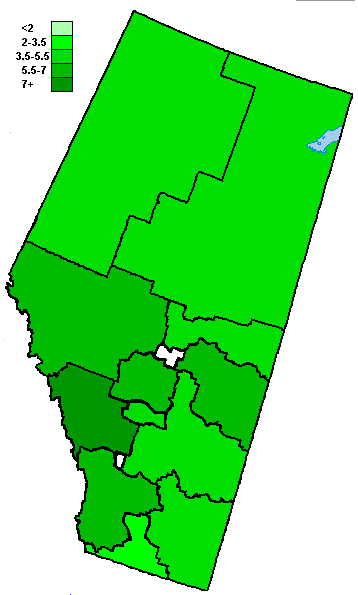
Green Party of Canada

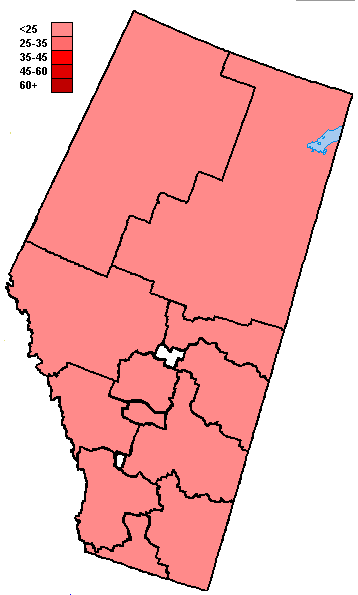
Liberal Party of Canada

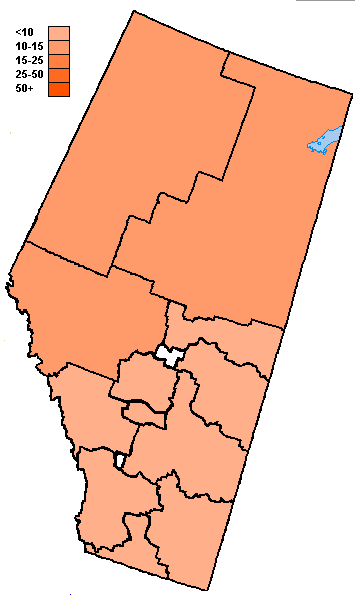
New Democratic Party

== 2000 ==
Electoral district	Candidates					Incumbent
Electoral district	Liberal	Canadian Alliance	NDP	PC	Other	Incumbent
Athabasca	Harold Cardinal; 9,793	David Chatters; 18,775	Alysia Erickson; 872	Doug Faulkner; 4,224	814	David Chatters
Crowfoot	Orest Werezak; 2,964	Kevin Sorenson; 33,767	Jay Russell; 1,457	Verlyn Olson; 6,778	Jack Ramsay; 2,668; Valerie Morrow; 223	Jack Ramsay (Note: Elected as a Reform Party MP in 1993 and 1997.)
Lakeland	Wayne Kowalski; 9,050	Leon Benoit; 29,348	Raymond Stone; 2,069	Paul Pelletier; 4,373		Leon Benoit
Lethbridge	Vaughan Hartigan; 7,797	Rick Casson; 30,380	Garth Hardy; 2,648	Kimberly Denise Budd; 4,062	1,128	Rick Casson
Macleod	Marlene Lamontagne; 4,137	Grant Hill; 30,783	Dwayne Good Striker; 2,945	Cyril R. Abbott; 6,079		Grant Hill
Medicine Hat	Trevor Butts; 4,392	Monte Solberg; 31,134	Luke Lacasse; 2,153	Gordon Musgrove; 4,236		Monte Solberg
Peace River	Kim Ksenia Fenton; 6,495	Charlie Penson; 27,508	Patricia Lawrence; 2,914	Milton Hommy; 5,021		Charlie Penson
Red Deer	Walter Kubanek; 6,522	Bob Mills; 36,940	Linda Roth; 2,346	Doug Wagstaff; 5,064		Bob Mills
Wetaskiwin	John Jackie; 8,318	Dale Johnston; 33,675	Cliff Reid; 2,045	Kenneth R. Sockett; 4,413		Dale Johnston
Wild Rose	Bryan E. Mahoney; 6,334	Myron Thompson; 40,193	Anne Wilson; 2,320	Truper Mcbride; 7,370	908	Myron Thompson
Yellowhead	John Higgerty; 6,348	Rob Merrifield; 26,824	J. Noel Lapierre; 1,910	Dale F. Galbraith; 5,141	371	Rob Merrifield
