= Earle Cook =

Canadian politician (1881–1966)

Earle Goodwin Cook
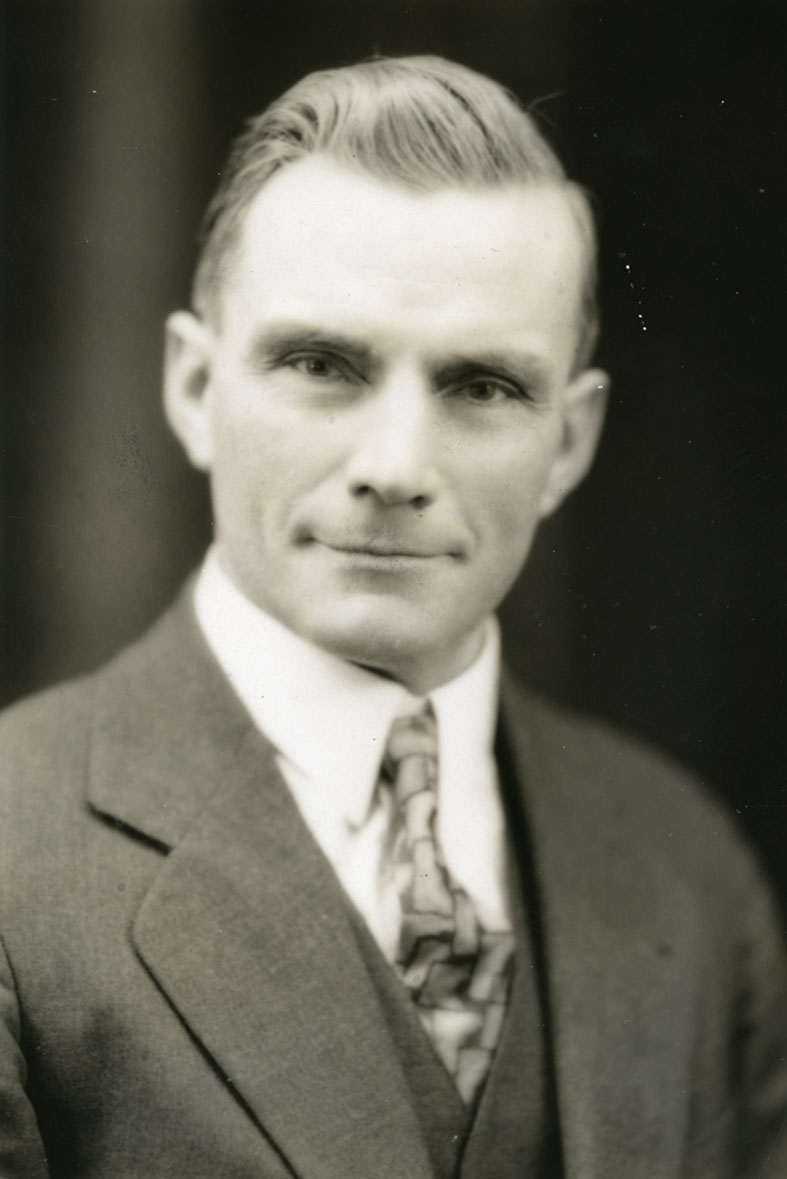

Member of the Legislative Assembly of Alberta
- In office July 18, 1921 – June 19, 1930
- Preceded by: John Kemmis
- Succeeded by: Harvey Bossenberry
- Constituency: Pincher Creek

Personal details
- Born: November 9, 1881 Woodburn, Ontario
- Died: April 20, 1966 (aged 84) Alberta, Canada
- Party: United Farmers
- Occupation: politician

Earle Goodwin Cook (November 9, 1881 – April 20, 1966) was a provincial politician from Alberta, Canada. He served as a member of the Legislative Assembly of Alberta from 1921 to 1930 sitting with the United Farmers caucus in government.

== Political career ==
Cook ran for a seat to the Alberta Legislature in the 1921 Alberta general election as a United Farmers candidate in the Pincher Creek electoral district. The race for the seat was hotly contested with four candidates running. Cook defeated Liberal candidate Harvey Bossenberry by 101 votes and the two others by even more, and won the seat for the Farmers party.

The 1926 Alberta general election saw Cook and Bossenberry face each other again. As well, Conservative R.O. Allison was in the running. In the first count of ballots, Bossenberry received the most votes but less than a majority of votes cast. The vote count process then went to a second round of counting - the votes of the supporters of the third-place candidate, Conservative R.O. Allison, were transferred. Cook received most of them and won by 52 votes over Bossenberry. This and the Bow Valley contest were the only instances in this election where a candidate who lead in the first count was not elected in the end, due to the instant-runoff voting system.

Cook ran for re-election in the 1930 Alberta general election. He again faced Bossenberry, this time in a straight two-way fight. Bossenberry edged Cook out by 39 votes to win the seat.

Cook tried to regain his seat, running in the 1935 Alberta general election. Four candidates were in the race this time. Cook again faced Bossenberry. Both Bossenberry and Cook were unsuccessful. Bossenberry was in second place; Cook was in a very distant fourth place. Social Credit candidate Roy Taylor won the seat by a majority of votes on the first round of counting.
