= Alberta (Provisional District) =

Former federal electoral district in the North-West Territories, Canada

Northwest Territories electoral district

Defunct federal electoral district
- Legislature: House of Commons
- District created: 1886
- District abolished: 1907
- First contested: 1887
- Last contested: 1904

The Alberta Provisional District was created in 1882, as an informal division of the settled part of the Northwest Territories.

When the North-West Territories was granted representation in the House of Commons in 1887, the Alberta district was used as a federal electoral district and was represented in the House of Commons of Canada from 1887 to 1908.

The Alberta federal riding had the same boundaries as the District of Alberta in 1887. The creation of the Edmonton, Calgary and Strathcona ridings in 1904 meant that the Alberta riding was left to covered just the part of the old district around Medicine Hat. In 1904, the Alberta riding covered only the southern part of Alberta district outside Calgary, with the north boundary being the north edge of the seventeenth township (now designated Township Road 180). In 1907, the Alberta riding was redistributed into a new Macleod riding and a new Medicine Hat riding.

== Members of Parliament ==
The Alberta riding elected the following members of Parliament:

Alberta (Provisional District)
Parliament	Years	Member	Party
Riding created
6th	1887–1891	Donald Watson Davis	Conservative
7th	1891–1896	Donald Watson Davis	Conservative
8th	1896–1900	Frank Oliver	Liberal
9th	1900–1904	Frank Oliver	Liberal
10th	1904–1908	John Herron	Liberal–Conservative
Riding dissolved into Macleod and Medicine Hat

== Election results ==
1887 Canadian federal election
Party	Candidate	Votes	%
Conservative	Donald Watson Davis	1,037	50.46
Independent Conservative	Richard Hardisty	783	38.10
Liberal	James Delamere Lafferty	235	11.44
Total valid votes		2,055	100.00
Total rejected ballots		unknown	
Turnout		2,055	69.66
Eligible voters		2,950	
Source: Library of Parliament

1891 Canadian federal election
Party	Candidate	Votes	%	±%
Conservative	Donald Watson Davis	2,742	74.57	+24.11
Conservative	James Reilly	935	25.43	–
Total valid votes		3,677	100.00	
Total rejected ballots		unknown		
Turnout		3,677	55.96	–13.70
Eligible voters		6,571		
Conservative hold		Swing		+24.57
Source: Library of Parliament

1896 Canadian federal election
Party	Candidate	Votes	%	±%
Liberal	Frank Oliver	3,647	55.42	–
Conservative	Thomas Cochrane	2,863	43.50	–31.07
Independent	Simon I. Clark	71	1.08	–
Total valid votes		6,581	100.00	
Total rejected ballots		unknown		
Turnout		6,581	64.02	+8.06
Eligible voters		10,279		
Liberal gain from Conservative		Swing		N/A
Source: Library of Parliament

1900 Canadian federal election
Party	Candidate	Votes	%	±%
Liberal	Frank Oliver	5,203	56.36	+0.94
Conservative	R. B. Bennett	4,029	43.64	+0.14
Total valid votes		9,232	100.00	
Total rejected ballots		unknown		
Turnout		9,232	76.53	+12.51
Eligible voters		12,064		
Liberal hold		Swing		+0.54
Source: Library of Parliament

1904 Canadian federal election
Party	Candidate	Votes	%	±%
Liberal–Conservative	John Herron	1,755	51.14	+7.50
Liberal	Malcolm McKenzie	1,677	48.86	–7.50
Total valid votes		3,432	100.00	
Total rejected ballots		unknown		
Turnout		3,432	98.82	+22.29
Eligible voters		3,473		
Liberal–Conservative gain from Liberal		Swing		+7.50
Source: Library of Parliament

(only covering the southern part of Alberta district outside Calgary)

== See also ==
- List of Canadian electoral districts
- Historical federal electoral districts of Canada
