= Order-in-Council P.C. 1911–1324 =

Proposed one-year ban of Black immigration to Canada in 1911

Order-in-Council P.C. 1911-1324
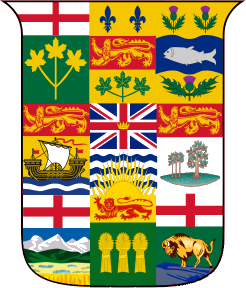
- Canada's Coat of Arms in 1911

The Governor General of Canada, by and with the consent of the King's Privy Council for Canada
- Territorial extent: Canada
- Considered by: The 8th Canadian Ministry
- Passed by: The Governor General of Canada, by and with the consent of the King's Privy Council for Canada
- Passed: August 12, 1911
- Commenced: N/A
- Repealed: October 5, 1911
- Introduced by: Frank Oliver

Repealed by
- Order-in-Council P.C. 1911-2378

Summary
- If enacted, it would have banned black immigrants from entering Canada for a one-year period.
- Status: Repealed

Order-in-Council P.C. 1911-1324 was a proposed one-year prohibition of black immigrants entering Canada because, according to the order-in-council, "the Negro race" was "unsuitable to the climate and requirements of Canada". It was tabled on June 2, 1911, by the Minister of the Interior, Frank Oliver, following mounting pressure from white prairie farmers who were discontented with an influx in the immigration of black farmers from the United States. Although it was approved by the Governor General in Council on August 12, it was never officially invoked or added to the Immigration Act, likely because the government—led by Prime Minister Wilfrid Laurier—was hesitant to alienate black voters ahead of the 1911 federal election. It was repealed by Order-in-Council P.C. 1911–2378 on Laurier's penultimate day in office, October 5.

Although Order-in-Council P.C. 1911-1324 was not put into effect, it is often cited as an instance of institutional racism in Canada.

== Context ==
=== Black immigration to Canada ===
Due to a rise in anti-black racism in the southern United States that followed, among other things, the introduction of the Jim Crow laws, Canada experienced an influx of interest from prospective black immigrants in the early twentieth century.

A rapid flight of African-Americans from the southern states caused land prices in the northern states that border Canada to skyrocket. For instance, land prices in North Dakota were twenty-five times higher than those in Saskatchewan by 1900. The Canadian government, meanwhile, was interested in bolstering the burgeoning agriculture industry in western Canada, and saw this as an opportunity to attract American immigrants to Canada. The Canadian government set up immigration offices throughout the United States, and advertised vacant farmland in American newspapers and magazines, including those with predominantly black readerships. For instance, the Saint Paul Broad Axe—a newspaper with a predominantly black readership—featured messages from the Premier of Manitoba inviting readers to migrate to Canada. The lack of colour distinctions in this advertising led prospective black immigrants to believe they would be welcomed in Canada.

Some 1,500 African Americans—a relatively small number when compared to the hundreds of thousands of white American farmers who made the move—immigrated to Canada between roughly 1905 and 1912, settling mainly in the agriculture-driven western provinces of Alberta and Saskatchewan.

=== An Act Respecting Immigration, 1910 ===
In 1910, the government passed a new law that enhanced the government's discretionary powers to regulate the flow of immigrants into Canada. This reform gave the Governor in Council (i.e., the Governor General, by and with the consent of the King's Privy Council for Canada) the authority to prohibit members of specific races or other groups from entering Canada. Section 38 of the Act, which was referenced in the Order-in-Council, stated that:

The Governor in Council may, by proclamation or order whenever he deems it necessary or expedient, — (c) prohibit for a stated period, or permanently, the landing in Canada, or the landing at any specified port of entry in Canada, of immigrants belonging to any race deemed unsuited to the climate or requirements of Canada, or of immigrants of any specified class, occupation or character.

=== Rising political pressure to lessen black migration ===
In around 1910, white prairie farmers—many of whom were motivated to settle in Canada by not only the cheap land prices, but also Canada's lack of a "black problem"—became increasingly disgruntled by the influx of black immigrants. This was exacerbated after a fifteen-year-old girl, Hazel Huff, accused a black man of assaulting her in her home and robbing her. Although the accused was promptly arrested, Huff later admitted to having fabricated the incident.

On March 31, 1911, the Edmonton chapter of the Imperial Order Daughters of the Empire—which, at the time, focused on the promotion of British imperialism—petitioned the Minister of the Interior by saying that "[black] immigration will have the immediate effect of... discouraging white settlement in the vicinity of the Negro farms and will depreciate the value of all holdings within such areas."

On April 3, William Thoburn, the Conservative member of Parliament for Lanark North in Ontario, asked in the House of Commons whether Prime Minister Laurier intended "to place any restrictions on or to stop altogether negro immigration from the southern states into" Canada. After questioning whether "negro colonization" was in Canada's interests, Thoburn went on to ask, "would it not be preferable to preserve for the sons of Canada the lands they propose to give to niggers?" The question was deferred to Minister Oliver, who declined to enact such restrictions unless they were passed by Parliament, and said that "any person coming from another country into Canada and having the necessary qualifications is entitled to a homestead, and negroes get free homesteads the same as any other people." Oliver's response to the question was contradicted by his eventual proposal, since orders-in-council do not require the approval of Parliament—only that of the governor general, on the Privy Council's recommendation.

== Furtive attempts to halt black migration ==
The government was set to face an election in a few months, and the popularity of Laurier and his Liberals had waned considerably at the time. To seek to boost his popularity, Laurier sought a free trade deal with the United States, and believed that caving to the domestic demands for a moratorium on black immigration would hinder this possibility. Furthermore, Laurier was hesitant to run the risk of alienating black voters during an election year.

So as to not hinder the prospective trade agreement and his popularity among black voters, Laurier's government attempted to furtively halt black immigration by, among other measures, sending immigration officials to the south to discourage black immigrants from entering Canada; invoking higher immigrations standards for black migrants, and prioritizing other races above them; petitioning American railways to deny black migrants access to Canada; making black migrants pay a full rail fare instead of the reduced rate for migrants; and rewarding or even bribing border officials who disqualified black immigrants.

== The order ==
Although the furtive attempts to halt black migration were largely successful, Minister Oliver still went on to introduce the proposed Order-in-Council on June 2, 1911. While serving as the Minister of the Interior and the Superintendent-General of Indian Affairs, Oliver was the Member of Parliament for Edmonton, where much of the political pressure originated from. It is, therefore, possible that Oliver proposed this order to appease his own constituents before the election.

The full text of the order was as follows:

P. C. 1324

AT THE GOVERNMENT HOUSE AT OTTAWA.

PRESENT:

HIS EXCELLENCY

IN COUNCIL:

His Excellency in Council, in virtue of the provisions of Sub-Section (c) of Section 38 of the Immigration Act, is pleased to Order and it is hereby Ordered as follows:—

For a period of one year from and after the date hereof the landing in Canada shall be and the same is prohibited of any immigrants belonging to the Negro race, which race is deemed unsuitable to the climate and requirements of Canada.

[Laurier's signature]

The order was ultimately considered on August 10, and approved two days thereafter. It was never officially invoked, or added to the Immigration Act.

=== Repealing ===
Laurier's Liberal Party subsequently lost the election on September 21, 1911. On October 5, 1911—mere days before Canada's next ministry, led by Prime Minister Robert Borden, was poised to take office—the order was repealed on the basis that Minister Oliver as not present when it was approved in August.

The text of Order-in-Council P.C. 1911–2378, which repealed Order-in-Council P.C. 1911–1324, was as follows:

P.C.2378.

AT THE GOVERNMENT HOUSE AT OTTAWA,

PRESENT

HIS EXCELLENCY

IN COUNCIL:

His excellency in Council is pleased to Order that the Order in Council of the 12th August, 1911, prohibiting, for a period of one year, the landing in Canada, of any immigrant belonging to the Negro race, shall be and the same is hereby cancelled, said Order in Council having been inadvertently passed in the absence of the Minister of the Interior.

[Laurier's signature]

== See also ==
- Canadian Indian residential school system
- Chinese head tax in Canada
- Chinese Immigration Act of 1885
- Immigration to Canada
- Internment of Japanese Canadians
- MS St. Louis
- Racism in Canada
- Vancouver anti-Asian riots
