= Myron Wolf Child =

Canadian Kainai youth activist and politician

Myron John Wolf Child (February 6, 1983 – February 27, 2007) was a youth activist, public speaker and politician from the Kainai Nation in southern Alberta, Canada. His surname was sometimes reported as Wolfchild or WolfChild.

== Background ==
Born in Cardston, Alberta, Wolf Child identified himself as a victim of child abuse and neglect, who overcame this past to deliver a message to fellow youth. He helped establish youth groups including the Flying Eagles Youth Council, the Kainai Youth Council, the Peigan Youth Task Force, the Junior Foundation and the First Nations Liaison Project. He was founder and president of the Reclaiming Hope Foundation, and CEO of Reclaiming Hope, Inc. He was National Aboriginal Coordinator for the Students Commission of Canada, research assistant with Alberta Children's Services and with the University of Lethbridge, and a project coordinator with Kainai Children's Services. He received an Alberta Great Kids Award in 2002, and an honourable mention in 2003 for an Aboriginal Youth Achievement Award in the National Aboriginal Achievement Awards, now the Indspire Awards.

By 2006, Wolf Child was a third-year native studies and political science student at the University of Lethbridge, where he was elected an Arts and Sciences representative to the University of Lethbridge Students' Union in March 2006.

In proceedings of the Senate of Canada Standing Committee on Aboriginal Peoples on 21 February 2001, Senator Landon Pearson cited Wolf Child's work as a youth member of the Canadian delegation to a preliminary meeting working towards the United Nations Special Session on Children. "He was splendid. People were blown away by his capacity to speak and to present himself and to connect with other young people. We are thrilled that we have been able to give him this opportunity." (The text records his surname as WolfChild.)

== Aboriginal Peoples Party founder and independent ==
In 2005, Wolf Child founded the Aboriginal Peoples Party of Canada, which since appears to have merged with the First Peoples National Party of Canada.

Wolf Child ran in the 2006 federal election as an independent candidate in the electoral district of Macleod in Alberta. In the first election after the Parliament of Canada had legalized same-sex marriage across the country, he identified his support for "the traditional definition of marriage" as a priority. He also condemned abortion. "I don’t think the courts should have the final say in these decisions, it’s undemocratic," he said.

Other priorities he identified included supporting farmers, veterans, and single mothers. He said he supported child care, opposed tax increases and supported public spending control. He also supported a "patient's bill of rights" for health care users, and proposed a national Aboriginal peace keepers' group to confront violence in native communities.

He received 1,055 votes, 2.12% of ballots cast. In a celebratory message to his website, he congratulated the winner, Conservative Ted Menzies, and their fellow candidates, and called his campaign a victory rather than a loss. "I will be there next time, but it won’t be as an independent," he wrote. "To tell you the truth, I was hoping to get at least 1,000 votes and I did."

== Post-election comments ==
Wolf Child posted a farewell to Liberal leader Paul Martin on his loss in that election. He wrote that he had supported Martin up to and through the 2003 leadership race, but that Martin had alienated faithful Liberals like Herb Dhaliwal, Allan Rock, John Manley, Sheila Copps, "and even poor little [Don] Boudria." "[D]on't push people around as you'll need them later on," he warned Martin. He ended the message more cheerfully: "Vive le Canada. Stay Cool and Have an awesome time."

Writing as acting leader of the APPC, he congratulated Conservative Prime Minister Stephen Harper on his appointment of Jim Prentice as Minister of Indian Affairs and Northern Development, appreciating that Prentice had committed to the Kelowna Agreement and to the residential school compensation package.

== Liberal leadership aspirant ==
Wolf Child's prospective candidacy in the 2006 Liberal Party of Canada leadership race was reported by the Lethbridge Herald on 15 February 2006. "I'd like to see the Liberal Party rejuvenated," he said. "I hope I can inspire and bring faith to Canadians to vote Liberal again."

In a 2 March 2006 comment to a post on his candidacy on the blog Our Thoughts, a poster identifying themselves as Wolf Child (including using his email address and website URL) wrote that "[due] to personal commitments and my education, I am hereby dropping my name from the list."

In a Lethbridge Herald article dated 1 April 2006, he again expressed his interest in running, saying that he expected to know whether he could raise the $50,000 and the signatures required to register within 45 days. He told the Herald he hoped to win support, especially from aboriginal organizations, and to make First Nations issues prominent in his campaign, but to speak to all Canadians as well. “I’m a people’s candidate," he said, "I want to address a lot of the social issues we have.”

== Criminal charges ==
The Lethbridge Herald reported in August 2006 that regional police had charged Wolf Child with two counts of sexual assault, stemming from the claim that he performed oral sex on a man and fondled the genitals of another at a house party in April 2005. Wolf Child entered a not guilty plea in court 23 October 2006. Wolf Child pleaded guilty to the charges during the start of his trial on 5 February 2007. A sentencing hearing was scheduled for 27 March.

== Death ==
After a long struggle, Myron Wolf Child committed suicide on 27 February 2007.
