= Hugh Murray Shaw =

Canadian politician (1876–1934)

Hugh Murray Shaw (November 13, 1876 in Kintore, Ontario – April 3, 1934) was a farmer, rancher and Canadian federal politician who represented the Alberta riding of Macleod for one term.

Shaw was elected to the House of Commons of Canada in the 1917 Canadian federal election. He defeated two other candidates by a wide margin to win the federal electoral district of Macleod for the Unionist Party.

Shaw attempted to run for re-election under the Conservative banner in the 1921 Canadian federal election. He would end up being defeated by Progressive Party of Canada candidate George Gibson Coote.

== See also ==
- 13th Canadian Parliament

Parliament of Canada
Preceded by David Warnock	Member of Parliament Macleod; 1917–1921	Succeeded by George Gibson Coote
