= Pincher Creek (provincial electoral district) =

Defunct provincial electoral district in Alberta, Canada

Coordinates: 49.51°N 113.96°W

Alberta electoral district

Defunct provincial electoral district
- Legislature: Legislative Assembly of Alberta
- District created: 1905
- District abolished: 1940
- First contested: 1905
- Last contested: 1935

Pincher Creek was a provincial electoral district in Alberta, Canada, mandated to return a single member to the Legislative Assembly of Alberta from 1905 to 1940.

== History ==
Members of the Legislative Assembly for Pincher Creek
Assembly	Years	Member	Party
1st	1905–1909	John Plummer Marcellus	Liberal
2nd	1909–1911	David Warnock	Liberal
2nd	1911–1913	John H.W.S. Kemmis	Conservative
3rd	1913–1917	John H.W.S. Kemmis	Conservative
4th	1917–1921	John H.W.S. Kemmis	Conservative
5th	1921–1926	Earle G. Cook	United Farmers
6th	1926–1930	Earle G. Cook	United Farmers
7th	1930–1935	Harvey Bossenberry	Liberal
8th	1935–1940	Roy Charles Taylor	Social Credit
See Pincher Creek-Crowsnest electoral district from 1940-1993 and Cardston electoral district from 1940-1993

The Pincher Creek electoral district was founded as one of the original 25 electoral districts contested in the 1905 Alberta general election upon Alberta being declared a province in September 1905.

From 1924 to 1940, the district used instant-runoff voting to elect its MLA.

The Pincher Creek electoral district was abolished prior to the 1940 Alberta general election and the territory was redistributed into the Pincher Creek-Crowsnest and Cardston electoral districts.

=== Electoral history ===
The election held in the Pincher Creek electoral district in 1905 was a hotly contested four-way race. At the time many worked as coal miners in the mountains while much of the foothills was used for cattle ranches.

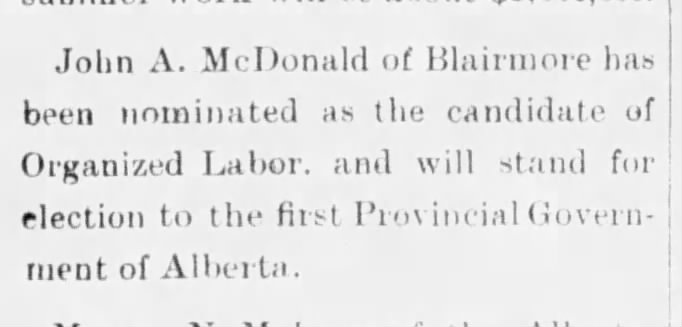
John A McDonald of Blairmore has been nominated as the candidate of Organized Labor, 1905

Former Mayor of the town of Pincher Creek, R. O. Allison unsuccessfully contested the 1926 and 1935 Alberta general elections.

UFA candidate Ernie Cook won the 1926 election. It was held using instant-runoff voting. He was not the most-popular candidate in the first round of counting, but no candidate had a majority of votes. When the Conservative candidate Allison's votes were transferred, Cook moved to the top spot and won the seat.

== Election results ==
=== 1905 ===
1905 Alberta general election
Party	Candidate	Votes	%	±%
Liberal	John Plummer Marcellus	550	39.40%	–
Conservative	Frank A. Sherman	436	31.23%	–
Independent	John H.W.S. Kemmis	410	29.37%	–
Total		1,396	–	–
Rejected, spoiled and declined		N/A	–	–
Eligible electors / turnout		N/A	N/A	–
Liberal pickup new district.				
Source(s) Source: "Pincher Creek Official Results 1905 Alberta general election". Alberta Heritage Community Foundation.

The Returning Officer for the election was James H. Schofield. The provincial Liberal candidate in the election was local rancher John Marcellus. The provincial Conservatives ran John Kemmis. The third-party candidate in the race was Frank Sherman who stood as a Labor candidate representing the United Mine Workers Union. Initially Charles Kettles was in the running as an independent candidate. Kettles was well known for founding the Pincher Creek townsite in 1882 when he worked for the North-West Mounted Police and for serving as a Department of Indian Affairs employee. He also ran a grocery store C. Kettles & Co. He dropped out of the race in time to have his name taken off the ballot.

On election night the race between Marcellus and Sherman seesawed back and forth. At one time during the night Marcellus conceded defeat as Sherman pulled ahead. However the election results turned as the final polls brought in favourable results for Marcellus, giving him a close victory. Kemmis ran a close third through the evening.

=== 1909 ===
1909 Alberta general election
Party	Candidate	Votes	%	±%
Liberal	David Warnock	560	57.26%	17.86%
Conservative	E.J. Mitchell	418	42.74%	11.51%
Total		978	–	–
Rejected, spoiled and declined		N/A	–	–
Eligible electors / turnout		1,301	75.17%	–
Liberal hold		Swing		3.18%
Source(s) Source: "Pincher Creek Official Results 1909 Alberta general election". Alberta Heritage Community Foundation.

=== 1911 by-election ===
Alberta provincial by-election, October 31, 1911 Upon the resignation of David Warnock to run for a seat in the House of Commons
Party	Candidate	Votes	%	±%
Conservative	John H.W.S. Kemmis	576	57.26%	14.52%
Liberal	J. F. Ross	430	42.74%	-14.52%
Total valid votes		1,006	–	–
Rejected, spoiled and declined		N/A	–	–
Electors / turnout		N/A	N/A	–
Conservative gain from Liberal		Swing		-7.26%
Source(s) "By-elections". Elections Alberta.

=== 1913 ===
1913 Alberta general election
Party	Candidate	Votes	%	±%
Conservative	John H.W.S. Kemmis	487	53.34%	-3.92%
Liberal	A. N. Mount	426	46.66%	3.92%
Total		913	–	–
Rejected, spoiled and declined		N/A	–	–
Eligible electors / turnout		1,053	86.70%	11.53%
Conservative hold		Swing		1.96%
Source(s) Source: "Pincher Creek Official Results 1913 Alberta general election". Alberta Heritage Community Foundation.

=== 1917 ===
1917 Alberta general election
Party	Candidate	Votes	%	±%
Conservative	John H.W.S. Kemmis	496	36.47%	-16.87%
Liberal	Thomas Hammond	448	32.94%	-13.72%
Nonpartisan League	J. E. Hillier	416	30.59%	–
Total		1,360	–	–
Rejected, spoiled and declined		N/A	–	–
Eligible electors / turnout		1,769	76.88%	-9.83%
Conservative hold		Swing		-1.58%
Source(s) Source: "Pincher Creek Official Results 1917 Alberta general election". Alberta Heritage Community Foundation.

=== 1921 ===
1921 Alberta general election
Party	Candidate	Votes	%	±%
United Farmers	Earle G. Cook	572	41.81%	–
Liberal	Harvey Bossenberry	471	34.43%	1.49%
Independent	A. E. Cox	192	14.04%	-16.55%
Independent	Donald Randolph McIvor	133	9.72%	-20.87%
Total		1,368	–	–
Rejected, spoiled and declined		N/A	–	–
Eligible electors / turnout		N/A	N/A	–
United Farmers gain from Conservative		Swing		1.93%
Source(s) Source: "Pincher Creek Official Results 1921 Alberta general election". Alberta Heritage Community Foundation.

=== 1926 ===
1926 Alberta general election
Party	Candidate	Votes 1st count	%	Votes final count	±%
United Farmers	Earle G. Cook	542	33.77%	720	-8.04%
Liberal	Harvey Bossenberry	592	36.88%	668	2.45%
Conservative	R. O. Allison	471	29.35%	–	–
Total		1,605	–	–	–
Rejected, spoiled and declined		37	–	–	–
Eligible electors / turnout		1,868	87.90%	–	–
United Farmers hold		Swing		-5.25%	
Source(s) Source: "Pincher Creek Official Results 1926 Alberta general election". Alberta Heritage Community Foundation. Instant-runoff voting requires a candidate to receive a plurality (greater than 50%) of the votes. As no candidate received a plurality of votes, the bottom candidate was eliminated and their 2nd place votes were applied to both other candidates until one received a plurality.

=== 1930 ===
1930 Alberta general election
Party	Candidate	Votes	%	±%
Liberal	Harvey Bossenberry	959	51.04%	14.15%
United Farmers	Earle G. Cook	920	48.96%	15.19%
Total		1,879	–	–
Rejected, spoiled and declined		38	–	–
Eligible electors / turnout		2,424	79.08%	-8.82%
Liberal gain from United Farmers		Swing		2.60%
Source(s) Source: "Pincher Creek Official Results 1930 Alberta general election". Alberta Heritage Community Foundation.

=== 1935 ===
1935 Alberta general election
Party	Candidate	Votes	%	±%
Social Credit	Roy Charles Taylor	1,214	51.66%	–
Liberal	Harvey Bossenberry	528	22.47%	-28.57%
Conservative	R. O. Allison	312	13.28%	–
United Farmers	Earle G. Cook	296	12.60%	-36.37%
Total		2,350	–	–
Rejected, spoiled and declined		65	–	–
Eligible electors / turnout		2,731	88.43%	9.34%
Social Credit gain from Liberal		Swing		13.56%
Source(s) Source: "Pincher Creek Official Results 1935 Alberta general election". Alberta Heritage Community Foundation.

== See also ==
- List of Alberta provincial electoral districts
- Canadian provincial electoral districts
