= John Kemmis =

Canadian politician

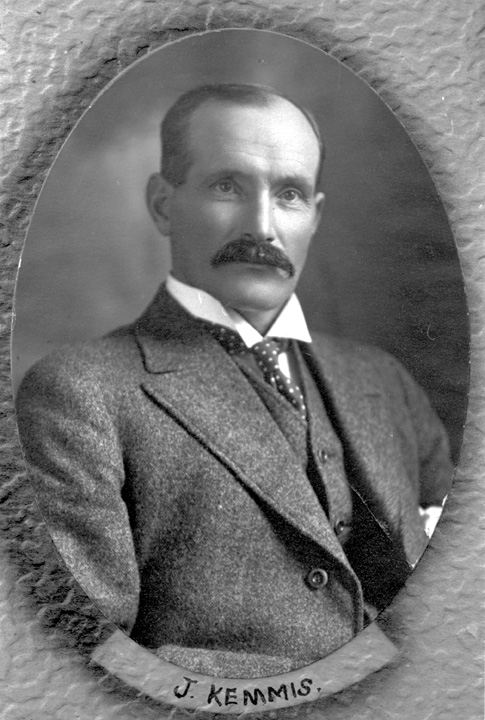

Member of the Legislative Assembly of Alberta
- In office 1911–1921
- Preceded by: David Warnock
- Succeeded by: Earle Cook
- Constituency: Pincher Creek

Personal details
- Born: October 1, 1867 Ooty, Madras Presidency, India
- Died: October 13, 1942 (aged 75) Calgary, Alberta, Canada
- Party: Conservative
- Occupation: rancher, farmer

John Henry William Shore Kemmis (October 1, 1867 – October 13, 1942) was a politician from Alberta, Canada. He served in the Legislative Assembly of Alberta from 1911 to 1921.

== Political career ==
Kemmis first ran for the Alberta Legislature as a Conservative candidate in the 1905 general election. He finished a very strong third place in the electoral district of Pincher Creek.

Running in a by-election held on October 31, 1911, he defeated Liberal candidate J.F. Ross and won the seat.

In the 1913 general election Kemmis retained the seat by a slim margin of 61 votes. In 1917 he defeated two other candidates. He retired from the Legislature at dissolution in 1921.

== Later life ==
He died in Calgary, Alberta in 1942.

Legislative Assembly of Alberta
Preceded by David Warnock	MLA Pincher Creek; 1911–1921	Succeeded by Earle Cook
