= Frank Oliver (politician) =

Canadian politician and journalist (1853–1933)

The Honourable Frank Oliver PC
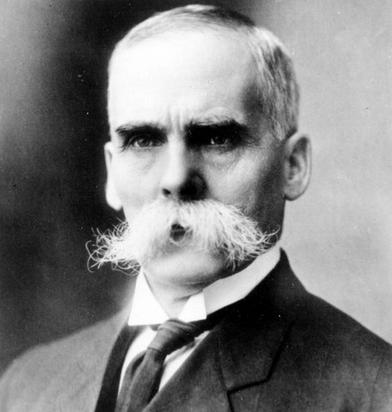

Minister of the Interior
- In office April 8, 1905 – October 6, 1911
- Preceded by: Clifford Sifton
- Succeeded by: Robert Rogers

Superintendent-General of Indian Affairs
- In office April 8, 1905 – October 6, 1911
- Preceded by: Wilfrid Laurier
- Succeeded by: Robert Rogers

Member of Parliament for Alberta (provisional district)
- In office June 23, 1896 – November 2, 1904
- Preceded by: Donald Watson Davis
- Succeeded by: John Herron

Member of Parliament for Edmonton
- In office November 3, 1904 – December 16, 1917
- Preceded by: Created
- Succeeded by: Abolished

Member of the Legislative Assembly for the Northwest Territories for Edmonton
- In office May 29, 1883 – January 1, 1885
- In office 1888 – May 1896

Personal details
- Born: Francis Robert Oliver Bowsfield; September 1, 1853 Peel County, Canada West
- Died: March 31, 1933 (aged 79) Ottawa, Ontario, Canada
- Party: Liberal
- Relatives: Allan Bowsfield (father) and Hannah (Anna) Lundy (mother)

Francis Oliver PC (born Francis Robert Oliver Bowsfield; September 1, 1853 – March 31, 1933) was a Canadian federal minister, politician, and journalist/newspaper publisher in the Northwest Territories and later Alberta. In 2021, following a story published in the Toronto Daily Tribune, discussion arose about Oliver's responsibility for discriminatory policies that targeted First Nations' land rights and Black immigration during his tenure as Minister of the Interior.

== Early life ==
Oliver was born Francis Bowsfield in Peel County, Canada West, just west of Toronto. He was the son of Allan Bowsfield and Hannah (Anna) Lundy. A disagreement in the family made him drop the name Bowsfield and adopt the name of his grandmother, Nancy Oliver Lundy.

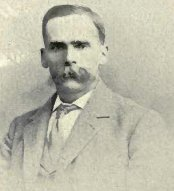
Frank Oliver in 1898

Oliver studied journalism in Toronto. In 1880, he moved west and founded the Edmonton Bulletin with his wife, Harriet Dunlop (1863–1943), and local entrepreneur Alexander Taylor. When the inaugural issue was printed on December 6, 1880, it became the first newspaper in what is now Alberta, and he owned it until 1923.

Oliver was active in what one historian called the "Edmonton Settlers' Rights Movement" of the 1880s. Prior to the official Dominion Land Survey, Oliver and others engaged in direct action to preserve land ownership rights of Edmonton "old-timers", against encroachment by later-arriving settlers, whom they termed "squatters". Oliver, later-mayor Matt McCauley, Metis Laurent Garneau, and several others faced criminal charges and a subsequent civil suit after a "squatter"'s shack was pushed into the river valley.

As well as defending the rights of pioneer "old-timers", Oliver used the Edmonton Bulletin as a platform to voice his opposition to the establishment and continued existence of Papaschase Indian Reserve Number 136. He continued this practice for eight years (even while he was an elected politician), until the federal government forced the Papaschase band members from their reserve. The land was divided between railway companies, settlers, and the federal government, who later auctioned their share off to settlers.

== Political career ==
=== Member of the North-West Council ===
Oliver was elected to the North-West Council in 1883. He was the second elected member to the 1st Council of the Northwest Territories, winning the May 29, 1883, election for the newly formed Edmonton district. In 1885, his newspaper pointed out that the NWT council did not have as many elected members as its population, 100,000, would warrant. Under the headline "Responsible Government", he called for a change in the way that members were elected.

The following month, he pointed out that out-migration to the U.S. was stunting Canada's own population growth, and the NWT was in large measure to account for that, due to conditions created by the Conservative government in Ottawa. He blamed the out-migration on "the unwise and ever changing land regulations, the enormous reserves [(land held by the HBC and the Crown and not open to local settlement)], the ill treatment of squatters [(pioneers who had settled in the NW prior to government survey)], the discriminating tariff, the railway monopoly, and the lack of political rights (the one statement that has been made and repeated on platform after platform), and on how North-West lands and NW settlers must ultimately pay the whole cost of the CPR."

Some of the stands he took in the NWT Council at Regina were not popular with all Edmontonians, least of all with local Conservatives. He organized a meeting in early January to refute charges that he was "an irreconcilable oppositionist with socialist tendencies", saying what he did had been in accordance "with the interests and wishes of the majority of his constituents".

In 1885, following the suppression of the Metis Rebellion, his newspaper said that the blame for the outbreak was shared "between Riel and the Ottawa government", singling out the late minister of the interior. His newspaper blamed the Conservative government's "deception, mismanagement and injustice" for having caused the rebellion.

Oliver lost his seat in the 1885 Northwest Territories election to a local physician, 25-year-old Herbert Charles Wilson.

Oliver contested and won one of two seats in the Edmonton district in 1888. He retained the seat by acclamation in the 1891 and 1894 elections. During his time as a territorial representative, he contributed to the creation of the North-West Territories' first public school system.

Oliver resigned from the council in 1896 to run for a seat in the House of Commons of Canada for the Liberal Party of Canada.

=== MP in the House of Commons ===
Running as a Liberal Party candidate in the 1896 federal election, Oliver was a champion of small farmers and business people pioneering in Alberta at the time. He was elected to represent the entire provisional district of Alberta and re-elected in 1900.

The large Alberta riding was broken up in 1904, and Edmonton acquired an MP. Oliver was elected to the newly formed Edmonton district in the 1904 Canadian federal election.

Following his appointment to the federal cabinet, he retained the seat in a 1905 ministerial by-election.

As leading federal politician of the western Prairies, Oliver was assigned by Wilfrid Laurier to draw up electoral boundaries used in the 1905 Alberta general election. The boundaries were said to favour Edmonton, where the Alberta Liberal Party enjoyed the most support, although overall, the Liberal Party got the majority of the votes cast and more votes than any other party in the election, including its main competitor, the Conservative party. Seven districts were drawn to touch Edmonton, and Edmonton's political weight is said to have assured the city's designation as the provincial capital, if its central location and long dominance in north-central Alberta had not been enough.

Oliver was also re-elected in the 1908 and 1911 Canadian federal elections.

=== Federal minister ===
From 1905 to 1911, Oliver served as the Minister of the Interior and Superintendent-General of Indian Affairs in the federal cabinet. Jasper National Park was established during his time as minister responsible for national parks.

Later, under the Dominion Forest Reserves and Parks Act of 1911, he drastically reduced the size of Rocky Mountains Park (later Banff National Park) from 11,400 km^{2} (4,400 sq mi) in 1902, to 4,663 km^{2} (1,800 sq mi); Kootenay Lakes Forest Reserve (later Waterton Lakes National Park) from 140 km^{2} (54 sq mi) in 1895 to 35 km^{2} (14 sq mi); and Jasper National Park from 12,950 km^{2} (5,000 sq mi) in 1907 to 2,590 km^{2} (1,000 sq mi). Much of the land thus freed was declared forest reserves in order to capitalize on its timber and mineral resources. Oliver's successor for Minister of the Interior, William James Roche, later expanded the three Alberta national parks closer to their earlier sizes: in 1914, Waterton Lakes National Park to 1,096 km^{2} (423 sq mi) and in 1917, Banff National Park to 7,125 km^{2} (2,751 sq mi) and Jasper National Park to 11,396 km^{2} (4,400 sq mi).

Oliver, unhappy with the centralized approach to the national parks system, reorganized it by creating the position of Commissioner of Dominion Parks, with its headquarters in Banff, Alberta; Howard Douglas, superintendent of Rocky Mountains Park (Banff National Park) since 1897, was appointed its first commissioner.

In 1907, Oliver established a commission to investigate Doukhobor settlement in Saskatchewan. The group had settled there on Clifford Sifton's promise that they could hold and work the land communally. The commission led to the reversal of Sifton's policy and the Doukhobors being dispossessed of the land they had immigrated from Russia to settle.

By 1911, Oliver had imposed tighter controls on immigration. He was staunchly British, and his policies favoured nationality over occupation. He asserted that his immigration policy was more "restrictive, exclusive and selective" than those of his predecessors. Like his predecessor, Clifford Sifton, Oliver encouraged European immigration, particularly of experienced farmers from Ukraine and other parts of Eastern Europe.

Oliver wrote Order-in-Council P.C. 1911–1324, which was approved by the Laurier Cabinet on August 12, 1911, under the authority of the Immigration Act, 1906. It was intended to keep out black Americans escaping segregation in the American South by stating that "the Negro race...is deemed unsuitable to the climate and requirements of Canada." The order was never called upon, as efforts by immigration officials had already reduced the number of blacks immigrating to Canada. Cabinet cancelled the order on October 5, 1911, the day before Laurier's government was replaced by the new Conservative government. The cancellation claimed that the Minister of the Interior was not present at the time of approval.

Oliver also used his newspaper to lobby for having the Papaschase Cree removed from their Treaty 6 reserve territory, south of Edmonton, in the 1880s.

== Later career and life ==
After the Liberal government was denied power in 1911, Oliver continued to serve in the House of Commons as Edmonton's MP until 1917.

He ran for re-election in the new riding of West Edmonton in 1917 and received the most votes cast in the district. His lead was eliminated, however, when officials of Robert Borden's Unionist government distributed the army vote, and he did not retain the seat.

Oliver ran in 1921 to regain his Edmonton West seat and was defeated by Donald Kennedy, a candidate of the United Farmers of Alberta.

He served on the Board of Railway Commissioners until his death.

Oliver died in 1933 in Ottawa. His body was brought to Edmonton, and it was interred in the Edmonton Cemetery.

== Family ==
Frank Oliver married Harriet Dunlop (1863–1943), daughter of Thomas Dunlop of Prairie Grove, Manitoba, in 1881. They had two sons: Allen, who was killed in World War I, and Jack, who also served on the front lines.

== Legacy ==
The area of downtown Edmonton west of 109 Street was named Oliver after the man; later, a major commercial strip in the neighbourhood was named Oliver Square.

On August 2, 2021, the Toronto Daily Tribune published the story "Edmonton's Oliver Square changes name after community consultation". It reported, "A member of Parliament and federal minister first elected to office in 1883, Oliver is known for drafting discriminatory legislation, including policies that pushed Indigenous people off their traditional lands." From mid-2020 to January 2024, the Oliver Community League, neighbourhood residents, Indigenous community members, and community members from other marginalized groups consulted on a new name for the neighbourhood. In January 2024, the city's committee on names selected wîhkwêntôwin (Cree for 'circle of friends') to replace "Oliver" and sent this recommendation to city council. On February 21, city council approved the name change, which went into effect on January 1, 2025.

Mount Oliver in the Victoria Cross Ranges is named after him.

Legislative Assembly of the Northwest Territories
Preceded by New District	MLA Edmonton; 1883–1885	Succeeded by Herbert Charles Wilson
Preceded by Herbert Charles Wilson	MLA Edmonton; 1888–1896	Succeeded by Matthew McCauley
Parliament of Canada
Preceded by Donald Watson Davis	Member of Parliament for Alberta (Provisional District); 1896–1904	Succeeded by John Herron
Preceded by New district	Member of Parliament for Edmonton; 1904–1917	Succeeded by District abolished
