= Ernest George Hansell =

Canadian politician and cleric (1895–1965)

Ernest George Hansell (14 May 1895 in Norwich, England – 9 December 1965) was an ordained minister as well as a Canadian federal and provincial politician.

== Federal politics ==
Hansell was the son of Walter Hansell, an FA Cup-winning footballer with the Old Carthusians in 1881.

Hansell ran as a Social Credit candidate in the 1935 federal election. He defeated incumbent Member of Parliament George Gibson Coote to win his first term in office.

Hansell was handpicked by Ernest Manning to serve as leader of the British Columbia Social Credit League during the 1952 British Columbia provincial election, despite the fact that Hansell was an Albertan. Social Credit unexpectedly won the election, but Hansell remained in Ottawa and the British Columbia party chose William Andrew Bennett as its new leader and Premier.

After helping Social Credit win the British Columbia provincial elections, Hansell would run for his 5th term in office in the 1953 federal election. He would defeat four other candidates, with the largest popular vote of his career. Hansell would run again for his sixth term in office in the 1957 federal election He would defeat Progressive Conservative Lawrence Kindt by a comfortable margin.

Parliament would be dissolved a year later, and Hansell and Kindt would face each other again. This time, Hansell would be defeated in the 1958 federal election amid that year's massive PC landslide. The entire Socred caucus was unseated at this election. After his defeat, Hansell continued to work with the Social Credit party on the provincial level in Alberta.

== Provincial politics ==
After his defeat from the House of Commons of Canada, Hansell ran for the Alberta Legislature in the 1959 Alberta general election. He defeated the incumbent Ross Ellis. Hansell served for one term as a backbencher in the Social Credit government before retiring from provincial politics in 1963.

Parliament of Canada
Preceded by George Gibson Coote	Member of Parliament Macleod; 1935-1958	Succeeded by Lawrence Kindt
Legislative Assembly of Alberta
Preceded by Ross Ellis	MLA Okotoks-High River; 1959–1963	Succeeded by Edward Benoit
