= Aboriginal Peoples Party of Canada =

Canadian political party

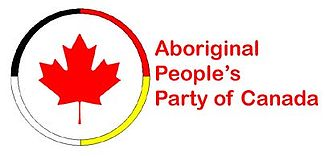
Official Logo of the Aboriginal Peoples Party of Canada, Designed by Myron Wolf Child, Founder in 2005

The Aboriginal Peoples Party of Canada (APP) was a Canadian political party that was founded in 2005. The party was conceived by University of Lethbridge student Myron Wolf Child. It held its founding meeting on August 21, 2005, in St. Albert, Alberta. The APP was headed by interim leader Bill Montour, a former Chief of the Six Nations Reserve in Ontario. In October 2005, the party had 122 confirmed members, just less than half the number needed to register as an official party in Canada. In late October 2005, the APP sought to unite with the First Peoples National Party of Canada which also had fewer than the number of confirmed members needed to become a registered political party. The First Peoples National Party of Canada became an eligible political party on December 6, 2005. Whether or not this was accomplished through a merger with the APP is unclear. If this is the case, the APP no longer exists, but, as one of the stipulations of a possible merger was that a name for the new party would be determined at the party's first convention, it is possible that the name Aboriginal Peoples Party of Canada will come into usage again.

In 2006, Wolf Child declared his intention to seek funds and support to stand as a candidate in that year's race for the leadership of the Liberal Party of Canada.

== See also ==
- List of political parties in Canada
