= David Warnock =

Canadian politician (1865–1932)

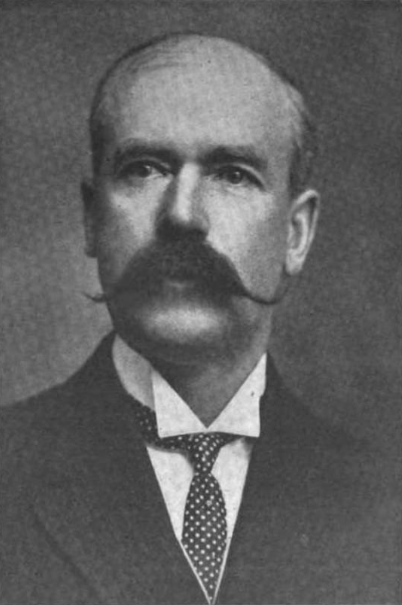

Member of the House of Commons of Canada
- In office 1911–1917
- Constituency: Macleod

Member of the Legislative Assembly of Alberta
- In office 1909–1911
- Constituency: Pincher Creek

Personal details
- Born: April 11, 1865; Hamilton, South Lanarkshire, Scotland
- Died: August 23, 1932 (aged 67); White Rock, British Columbia
- Spouse: Annie Whitelaw (m. 1897)
- Children: 2
- Education: Hamilton Academy; West of Scotland Technical College
- Occupation: Veterinarian, politician

David Warnock, OBE (April 11, 1865 – August 23, 1932) was a politician and veterinarian from Alberta, Canada. He was educated at the Hamilton Academy, Lanarkshire, Scotland and at the West of Scotland Technical College (eventually becoming in 1964 the University of Strathclyde), graduating MRCVS. In 1889 he emigrated to the North West Territories, Canada.

== Early life ==
David Warnock was born on April 11, 1865, in Hamilton, South Lanarkshire, Scotland. He married Annie Whitelaw in October 1897 and they had two children. He moved to Alberta in December 1889 and to British Columbia on March 27, 1919.

He served as the first president of the Alberta Veterinary Medical Association from 1906 to 1916.

== Political career ==
Warnock was first elected to the Legislative Assembly of Alberta for the Pincher Creek electoral district in the 1909 Alberta general election. He won the a very tight race by less than 100 votes. Less than a year later he resigned his seat and took the opportunity to run in the 1911 Canadian federal election.

In that federal election he ran in the Macleod district defeating incumbent Member of Parliament John Herron. He served one full term in the House of Commons of Canada and did not run again.

Warnock was invested O.B.E. in June 1918 and in 1919 was appointed Deputy Minister for Agriculture, Government of British Columbia, a position he held until a few weeks before his death.

He died on August 23, 1932, drowning after jumping from a coastal steamer near White Rock.

Legislative Assembly of Alberta
Preceded by John Plummer Marcellus	MLA Pincher Creek; 1909-1911	Succeeded by John Kemmis
Parliament of Canada
Preceded by John Herron	Member of Parliament Macleod; 1911-1917	Succeeded by Hugh Murray Shaw
