= Harvey Bossenberry =

Canadian politician (1880–1951)

Member of the Legislative Assembly of Alberta
- In office June 19, 1930 – August 22, 1935
- Preceded by: Earle Cook
- Succeeded by: Roy Taylor
- Constituency: Pincher Creek

Personal details
- Born: December 15, 1880 Huron County, Ontario
- Died: June 19, 1951 (aged 70) Pincher Creek, Alberta
- Party: Liberal
- Spouse: Mary Ravelle
- Occupation: merchant, politician

Harvey Bossenberry (December 15, 1880 – June 19, 1951) was a provincial politician from Alberta, Canada. He served as a member of the Legislative Assembly of Alberta from 1930 to 1935 sitting with the Liberal caucus in opposition.

== Early life ==
Harvey Bossenberry was born December 15, 1880, in Huron County, Ontario, to Henry Bossenberry and Caroline Rau, both of German descent. He was educated at Grand Bend, Ontario Public School and Parkhill High School. Bossenberry eventually attended Forest Model School and Stratford Business College. He married Mary Ravelle on August 12, 1904. Bossenberry served as the mayor of Pincher Creek in 1920 and 1928.

== Political career ==
Bossenberry ran for a seat to the Alberta Legislature in the 1921 Alberta general election as a Liberal candidate in the electoral district of Pincher Creek. Bossenberry finished second out of four candidates losing to United Farmers candidate Earle Cook.

Cook and Bossenberry ran against each other for the second time in the 1926 Alberta general election. The three way race was hotly contested with Cook defeating Bossenberry in the second vote count.

Bossenberry ran against Cook for the third time in the 1930 Alberta general election. He defeated Cook in a very close two way race by 39 votes to pick up the seat for his party.

After the election, Bossenberry became embroiled in the controversy surrounding the leadership of John McDonald and his quest to find a seat after being defeated in the election. McDonald had run for election in the neighboring Macleod riding. Bossenberry refused to yield his seat to McDonald to run in a by-election.

Cook and Bossenberry would face each other in the fourth straight election held in 1935. They were both defeated with Cook finishing in last place and Bossenberry a distant second losing to Social Credit candidate Roy Taylor in the four way race.
