= Donald Watson Davis =

Canadian politician (1849–1906)

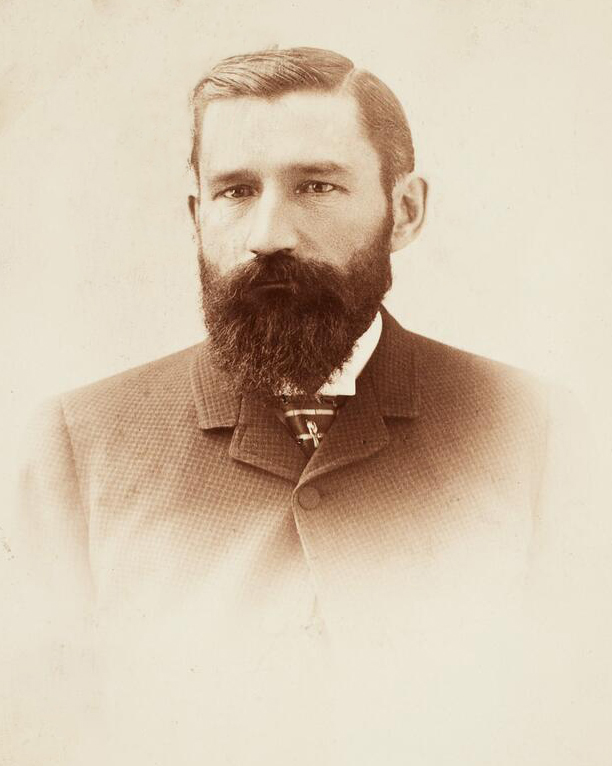

Member of Parliament for Alberta (provisional district)
- In office February 22, 1887 – June 22, 1896
- Preceded by: district created
- Succeeded by: Frank Oliver

Personal details
- Born: November 23, 1849 Londonderry, Vermont
- Died: June 4, 1906 (aged 56)

Donald Watson Davis (November 23, 1849 – June 4, 1906) was a politician from Northwest Territories, Canada.

== Early life ==
He was born in Londonderry, Vermont. He served in the Union army during the U.S. Civil War.

== Career ==
He moved to southern Alberta in 1869. He worked as a whiskey peddler at Fort Whoop-up when the North-West Mounted Police marched west in 1874. He turned his hand to building the NWMP's Fort Macleod and Fort Calgary.

He was general manager of the I.G. Baker and Company in Alberta in the 1880s.

Davis was elected to the House of Commons of Canada in the 1887 Canadian federal election. He was one of the first Members of Parliament to represent the North-West Territories. He represented the new Alberta (Provisional District). He was re-elected in 1891.

Preceded by New District	Member of Parliament Alberta (Provisional District); 1887–1896	Succeeded by Frank Oliver
