= John Plummer Marcellus =

Canadian politician

Member of the Legislative Assembly of Alberta
- In office 1905–1909
- Succeeded by: David Warnock
- Constituency: Pincher Creek

Personal details
- Born: July 26, 1838 Morrisburg, Upper Canada
- Died: May 29, 1932 (aged 93) Pincher Creek, Alberta
- Party: Liberal
- Occupation: rancher, farmer

John Plummer Marcellus (July 26, 1838 – May 29, 1932) was a Canadian politician and rancher from Alberta.

== Early life ==
He was born at Morrisburg, Upper Canada. Marcellus married his wife Maria Barkley in 1871 at Dunbar, Ontario.

== 1905 election ==
Marcellus ran for the Alberta legislature in the 1905 Alberta general election. He won a hotly contested 3-way race in the Pincher Creek electoral district in rural southeast Alberta. He served one term as a backbencher in the Legislative Assembly before retiring in 1909. He died in 1932 at Pincher Creek.
