= Maitland Stewart McCarthy =

Canadian politician

Maitland Stewart McCarthy KC
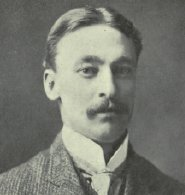

Member of the Canadian Parliament for Calgary
- In office November 3, 1904 – September 20, 1911
- Preceded by: New District
- Succeeded by: R. B. Bennett

Justice of the Supreme Court of Alberta
- In office July 11, 1914 – May 3, 1926

Personal details
- Born: February 5, 1872 Orangeville, Ontario, Canada
- Died: May 17, 1930 (aged 58) Montreal, Quebec, Canada
- Party: Conservative
- Education: Trinity College

Maitland Stewart McCarthy KC (February 5, 1872 – May 17, 1930) was a politician, lawyer and judge from western Canada.

Born in Orangeville, Ontario, he was the son of Thomas Anthony Maitland McCarthy, a county court judge, and Jennie Frances Stewart. He studied at Trinity College School in Port Hope and Trinity University, receiving a LLB in 1896. He was called to the Ontario bar in 1897 and set up practice in Sarnia.

== Marriage/Relocation ==
In 1900, he married Eva Florence Watson. McCarthy moved to Calgary, then part of the Northwest Territories, in 1903. He was admitted to the bar and set up practice in Calgary with William L. Walsh.

== Politics ==
Maitland was elected Calgary's first direct member of the House of Commons of Canada after the redistribution prior to the 1904 federal election gave Calgary its first direct seat. He was re-elected to a second term in the 1908 Canadian federal election.

Maitland was offered leadership of the provincial Conservative Party prior to the 1909 Alberta general election, but declined the offer of leadership as he would have to resign his federal seat which he won in a controversial election in 1908, and felt the resignation would be seen as an admission of guilt.

=== Electoral record ===
1904 Canadian federal election: Calgary
Party	Candidate	Votes	%	±%
Conservative	Maitland Stewart McCarthy	2,993	54.04	–
Liberal	Charles John Stewart	2,545	45.96	–
Total valid votes		5,538	100.00	
Total rejected ballots		unknown		
Turnout		5,538	74.37	–
Eligible voters		7,447		
Source: Library of Parliament

1908 Canadian federal election: Calgary
Party	Candidate	Votes	%	±%
Conservative	Maitland Stewart McCarthy	4,105	49.66	–4.38
Liberal	Charles John Stewart	3,418	41.35	–4.61
Socialist	Frank Sherman	743	8.99	–
Total valid votes		8,266	99.23	
Total rejected ballots		64	0.77	–
Turnout		8,330	81.63	–
Eligible voters		10,205		
Source: Library of Parliament

== Post-politics ==
After leaving politics, he returned to the practice of law. McCarthy was named King's Counsel in 1913 and, in 1914, he was appointed to the Supreme Court of Alberta. In 1926, he retired from the bench due to health problems.

== Death ==
McCarthy died while on vacation in Montreal in 1930, aged 58.
