= Ken Hughes (politician) =

Canadian politician

The Honourable Kenneth Gardner Hughes ECA

Member of Parliament for Macleod
- In office 1988–1993
- Succeeded by: Grant Hill

MLA for Calgary-West
- In office 2012–2014
- Preceded by: Ron Liepert
- Succeeded by: Mike Ellis

Personal details
- Born: 11 February 1954 (age 72) High River, Alberta
- Party: Alberta Progressive Conservative
- Other political affiliations: Federal Progressive Conservative

Kenneth Gardner Hughes ECA (born February 11, 1954) is a Canadian politician. He served as a member of the House of Commons of Canada from 1988 to 1993. Later he was chair of Alberta Health Services from 2008 to 2011, before being elected to the Legislative Assembly of Alberta in 2012. He served in the provincial cabinet first as Energy minister, then as Municipal Affairs minister until resigning on April 7, 2014 to enter the Progressive Conservative Association of Alberta leadership election. Hughes withdrew his candidacy on May 12, 2014, to endorse the eventual winner, Jim Prentice and resigned from the legislature on September 29, 2014.

== Early life ==
Hughes holds an undergraduate degree in agriculture from the University of Alberta. He also has a masters in public administration from the John F. Kennedy School of Government at Harvard University (1981-1983) with a focus on public and corporate finance.

== Federal career ==
Hughes represented the Alberta riding of Macleod which he won in the 1988 federal election. Hughes served one term in the 34th Canadian Parliament after which he was defeated by Grant Hill of the Reform party in the 1993 election.

== Health care career ==
Following his departure from federal politics, Hughes was appointed as board chairman for the Headwaters Health Authority, a role he filled from 1994 to 1995. He was appointed as the founding chairman of Alberta Health Services on May 15, 2008 and served in this role until 2011.

== Provincial politics ==
Hughes left Alberta Health Services and ran for the Progressive Conservative nomination in Calgary-West that was held after incumbent Ron Liepert announced his retirement. He was defeated by former MLA Shiraz Shariff. Controversy would ensue as the nomination results were overturned by the party due to complaints and uncited irregularities. A second nomination meeting was held, which Hughes won.

Hughes won the Calgary-West seat during the April 23, 2012 election. Hughes was appointed to Cabinet by Premier Redford to the post of Minister of Energy. Following the Cabinet shuffle in November 2013, Hughes was asked to serve as the Minister of Municipal Affairs, resigning in April 2014 to run for party leader. While he was expected to be a frontrunner, he dropped out prior to the opening of nominations due to lack of support and endorsed Jim Prentice. He resigned from the Legislature on September 29, 2014.
