= George Gibson Coote =

Canadian politician (1880–1959)

Member of Parliament
- In office 1921–1935
- Preceded by: Hugh Murray Shaw
- Succeeded by: Ernest George Hansell
- Constituency: Macleod

Personal details
- Born: August 18, 1880 Oakville, Ontario, Canada
- Died: November 24, 1959 (aged 79) Nanton, Alberta, Canada
- Party: Progressive Party of Canada; United Farmers of Alberta

George Gibson Coote (August 18, 1880 – November 24, 1959) was a Canadian accountant, bank manager, farmer, and federal politician.

== Political career ==
Coote was elected to the House of Commons of Canada in the 1921 Canadian federal election as a Progressive Party of Canada candidate in the Macleod electoral district. He defeated 3 other candidates in a landslide. Coote ran for re-election in the 1925 Canadian federal election he won a hotly contested election against former Conservative Member of Parliament John Herron and Alberta MLA Thomas Milnes.

Less than a year later he defended his incumbency after the governing coalition fell apart in the 1926 Canadian federal election. He was elected defeating John Herron increasing his plurality. He ran in that election under the United Farmers of Alberta banner. Coote ran for his 5th term in the Canadian House of Commons in the 1930 Canadian federal election and was re-elected.

Coote was a member of the Ginger Group of radical MPs in the 1920s and early 1930s. A founding member of the Co-operative Commonwealth Federation he, like all but one of the eight UFA MPs, ran for re-election under the CCF banner in the 1935 Canadian federal election. He was defeated by Ernest George Hansell from the Social Credit Party of Canada.
