= Calgary (federal electoral district) =

Former federal electoral district in Canada

Alberta electoral district

Defunct federal electoral district
- Legislature: House of Commons
- District created: 1903
- District abolished: 1914
- First contested: 1905
- Last contested: 1911

Calgary was a federal electoral district in Alberta, Canada that was represented in the House of Commons of Canada from 1904 to 1917. It was located initially in the North-West Territories. Following the creation of the province of Alberta in 1905, the riding was located in that province. (From 1905 to 1907, Calgary riding also included parts of Saskatchewan.)

== History ==
This riding was created in 1903, and abolished in 1914 when it was redistributed between Calgary West, East Calgary and Macleod ridings.

=== Members of Parliament ===
This riding has elected the following members of the House of Commons of Canada:

Calgary
Parliament	Years	Member	Party
Riding created from Alberta
10th	1905–1908	Maitland Stewart McCarthy	Conservative
11th	1908–1911	Maitland Stewart McCarthy	Conservative
12th	1911–1917	Richard Bennett	Conservative
Riding dissolved into Calgary West, East Calgary and Macleod

== Election results ==
1911 Canadian federal election
Party	Candidate	Votes	%	±%
Conservative	R. B. Bennett	7,671	58.15	+8.49
Liberal	Isaac Stephen Gerow Van Wart	4,805	36.42	–4.93
Unknown	Arthur Masters	716	5.43	–
Total valid votes		13,192	100.00	
Total rejected ballots		unknown		
Turnout		13,192	75.44	–
Eligible voters		17,486		
Conservative hold		Swing		+6.71
Source: Library of Parliament

1908 Canadian federal election
Party	Candidate	Votes	%	±%
Conservative	Maitland Stewart McCarthy	4,105	49.66	–4.38
Liberal	Charles John Stewart	3,418	41.35	–4.61
Socialist	Frank Sherman	743	8.99	–
Total valid votes		8,266	99.23	
Total rejected ballots		64	0.77	–
Turnout		8,330	81.63	–
Eligible voters		10,205		
Source: Library of Parliament

1904 Canadian federal election
Party	Candidate	Votes	%	±%
Conservative	Maitland Stewart McCarthy	2,993	54.04	–
Liberal	Charles John Stewart	2,545	45.96	–
Total valid votes		5,538	100.00	
Total rejected ballots		unknown		
Turnout		5,538	74.37	–
Eligible voters		7,447		
Source: Library of Parliament

== See also ==
- Calgary (provincial electoral district)
- Calgary (N.W.T. electoral district)
- List of Canadian electoral districts
- Historical federal electoral districts of Canada
