= Lawrence Kindt =

Canadian politician

- Official 1966 portrait

Member of Parliament for Macleod
- In office 1958–1968
- Preceded by: Ernest George Hansell
- Succeeded by: riding dissolved

Personal details
- Born: February 23, 1901 Kiona, Washington, U.S.
- Died: April 1, 1973 (aged 72) Calgary, Alberta, Canada
- Party: federal Progressive Conservative

Lawrence Elliott Kindt (February 23, 1901 – April 1, 1973) was a farmer economist and served as a Canadian federal politician from 1958 to 1968. He was born in Kiona, Washington, United States.

Kindt first ran for a seat in the House of Commons of Canada in the 1957 federal election. He was defeated by incumbent Ernest Hansell. Kindt ran again in the 1958 federal election, defeating Hansell to win his first term in office. He was re-elected in the 1962 federal election, the 1963 federal election and the 1965 federal election.

He retired from federal politics in 1968 and died in 1973.
