= John Herron (Alberta politician) =

Canadian politician (1853–1926)

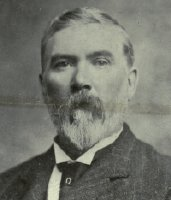

Member of the Canadian Parliament for Alberta (Provisional District)
- In office 1904–1908
- Preceded by: Frank Oliver
- Succeeded by: District Abolished

Member of the Canadian Parliament for Macleod
- In office 1908–1911
- Preceded by: New District
- Succeeded by: David Warnock

Personal details
- Born: November 15, 1853 Ashton, Canada West
- Died: August 20, 1936 (aged 82)
- Party: Liberal-Conservative

John Herron (November 15, 1853 – August 20, 1936) was a politician from Western Canada.

== Political career ==
Herron was born in Ashton, Carleton County, Canada West. He was first elected to Parliament in the Alberta Provisional District in the 1904 federal election; he defeated Malcolm McKenzie by less than 100 votes.

After the creation of the province of Alberta, Herron ran in the new electoral district of Macleod in the 1908 federal election and was re-elected. In the 1911 election he was defeated by David Warnock of the Liberal Party of Canada.

Herron tried to return to Parliament in the 1925 federal election. He ran against George Coote and former Alberta MLA Thomas Milnes and was defeated. He ran again in the 1926 election but was defeated again.
