= Roy Charles Taylor =

Canadian politician

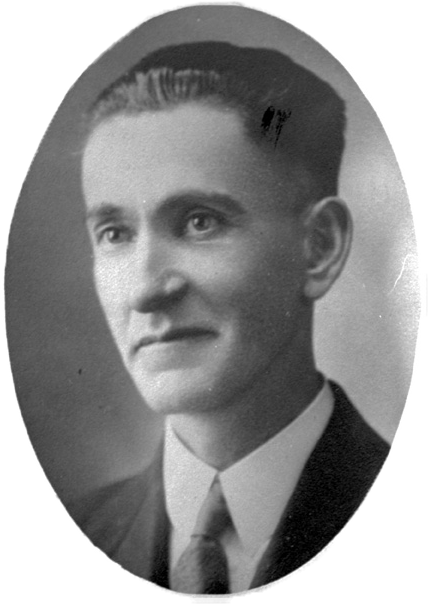

Member of the Legislative Assembly of Alberta
- In office 1935–1940
- Preceded by: Harvey Bossenberry
- Succeeded by: District abolished
- Constituency: Pincher Creek

Personal details
- Born: December 11, 1889 Sunnyside, Alberta
- Died: June 22, 1963 (aged 73) Calgary, Alberta
- Party: Social Credit

Roy Charles Taylor (December 11, 1889 – June 22, 1963) was a Canadian politician who served as a member of the Legislative Assembly of Alberta from 1935 to 1940, sitting with the Social Credit caucus in government. He died after a brief illness in 1963.
