= Macleod (federal electoral district) =

Former federal electoral district in Alberta, Canada

Coordinates: 50.3°N 113.6°W

Alberta electoral district
- Macleod in relation to the other Alberta federal electoral districts

Defunct federal electoral district
- Legislature: House of Commons
- District created: 1987
- District abolished: 2012
- First contested: 1988
- Last contested: 2014 by-election
- District webpage: profile, map

Demographics
- Population (2011): 123,778
- Electors (2011): 81,141
- Area (km²): 28,303.15
- Census division(s): Division No. 3, Division No. 6, Division No. 15
- Census subdivision(s): Arrowwood, Bighorn No. 8, Black Diamond, Blood 148, Calgary, Cardston County, Carmangay, Champion, Claresholm, Cochrane, Cowley, Crowsnest Pass, Eden Valley 216, Foothills No. 31, Fort Macleod, Glenwood, Granum, High River, Hill Spring, Kananaskis, Lomond, Longview, Milo, Nanton, Okotoks, Piikani 147, Pincher Creek, Pincher Creek No. 9, Ranchland No. 66, Rocky View County, Siksika 146, Stavely, Stoney 142, 143, 144, Tsuu T'ina Nation 145 (Sarcee 145), Turner Valley, Vulcan, Vulcan County, Willow Creek No. 26

Macleod was a federal electoral district in Alberta, Canada, that was represented in the House of Commons of Canada from 1908 to 1968 and from 1988 to 2015. It was a mostly rural riding in southwest Alberta, however it extended as far north as the outer suburbs of Calgary, and in its final years included a few slivers of Calgary itself. It covered the Municipal District of Foothills No. 31, Municipal District of Willow Creek No. 26, Municipal District of Pincher Creek No. 9, Municipal District of Ranchland No. 66, Vulcan County, the Municipality of Crowsnest Pass, and Kananaskis Improvement District. It also included the towns of Okotoks, Cochrane, and High River.

== Demographics ==
According to the 2011 Canadian census

Ethnic groups: 84.1% White, 12.1% Aboriginal
Languages: 87.7% English, 3.6% German, 1.4% French, ~1.8% Blackfoot (Blackfoot/Kainai counted as "Other language" on the Census; this number derived from "other language" speakers on Blackfoot/Kainai reserves)
Religions: 67.4% Christian (22.7% Catholic, 12.2% United Church, 6.0% Anglican, 2.9% Lutheran, 1.8% Pentecostal, 1.6% Baptist, 1.4% Presbyterian, 18.8% Other Christian), 1.9% Traditional Aboriginal spirituality, 28.9% No religion
Median income (2010): $33,338

== History ==
This riding was originally created in 1907 from parts of District of Alberta and Calgary ridings.

It was abolished in 1966 when it was redistributed into Rocky Mountain, Palliser, Crowfoot, Lethbridge and Medicine Hat ridings.

It was re-created in 1987 from Bow River, Lethbridge—Foothills, Medicine Hat and Wild Rose ridings.

Due to the 2012 federal electoral boundaries redistribution the riding was abolished prior to the next election. Most of the riding was transferred to the new riding of Foothills. Small parts were also transferred to Bow River, Medicine Hat—Cardston—Warner and Banff—Airdrie. Small portions that had been annexed into Calgary joined Calgary Midnapore and Calgary Signal Hill.

=== Members of Parliament ===
This riding has elected the following members of the House of Commons of Canada:

Parliament	Years	Member	Party
Macleod; Riding created from Calgary and Alberta provisional district
11th	1908–1911	John Herron	Liberal–Conservative
12th	1911–1917	David Warnock	Liberal
13th	1917–1921	Hugh Murray Shaw	Government (Unionist)
14th	1921–1925	George Gibson Coote	Progressive
15th	1925–1926	George Gibson Coote	Progressive
16th	1926–1930	George Gibson Coote	United Farmers
17th	1930–1935	George Gibson Coote	United Farmers
18th	1935–1940	Ernest George Hansell	Social Credit
19th	1940–1945	Ernest George Hansell	Social Credit
20th	1945–1949	Ernest George Hansell	Social Credit
21st	1949–1953	Ernest George Hansell	Social Credit
22nd	1953–1957	Ernest George Hansell	Social Credit
23rd	1957–1958	Ernest George Hansell	Social Credit
24th	1958–1962	Lawrence Kindt	Progressive Conservative
25th	1962–1963	Lawrence Kindt	Progressive Conservative
26th	1963–1965	Lawrence Kindt	Progressive Conservative
27th	1965–1968	Lawrence Kindt	Progressive Conservative
Riding dissolved into Rocky Mountain, Palliser, Crowfoot, Lethbridge and Medicine Hat
Riding re-created from Bow River, Lethbridge—Foothills, Medicine Hat and Wild Rose
34th	1988–1993	Ken Hughes	Progressive Conservative
35th	1993–1997	Grant Hill	Reform
36th	1997–2000	Grant Hill	Reform
36th	2000–2000	Grant Hill	Alliance
37th	2000–2003	Grant Hill	Alliance
37th	2003–2004	Grant Hill	Progressive Conservative
37th	2004–2004	Grant Hill	Conservative
38th	2004–2006	Ted Menzies	Conservative
39th	2006–2008	Ted Menzies	Conservative
40th	2008–2011	Ted Menzies	Conservative
41st	2011–2013	Ted Menzies	Conservative
41st	2014–2015	John Barlow	Conservative
Riding dissolved into Foothills, Bow River, Medicine Hat—Cardston—Warner, Banff—Airdrie, Calgary Signal Hill and Calgary Midnapore

=== Current member of Parliament ===
The seat was last held by John Barlow, a Conservative and a former newspaper editor, who was elected in a by-election on June 30, 2014, following the resignation of Ted Menzies on November 6, 2013.

== Election results ==
=== 1988–2015 ===
Canadian federal by-election, June 30, 2014 Resignation of Ted Menzies
Party	Candidate	Votes	%	±%	Expenditures
Conservative	John Barlow	12,616	69.16	–8.33	$66,422.40
Liberal	Dustin Fuller	3,092	16.95	+13.27	$52,667.62
Green	Larry Ashmore	991	5.43	+0.81	$166.57
Christian Heritage	David J. Reimer	774	4.24	+3.76	$13,438.51
New Democratic	Aileen Burke	770	4.22	–6.11	$399.13
Total valid votes/expense limit		18,243	99.56	–	$114,481.41
Total rejected ballots		81	0.44	+0.14	
Turnout		18,324	19.85	–40.57	
Eligible voters		92,332			
Conservative hold		Swing		–10.80	
Source: Elections Canada

2011 Canadian federal election
Party	Candidate	Votes	%	±%	Expenditures
Conservative	Ted Menzies	40,007	77.48	+0.12	$52,405.99
New Democratic	Janine Giles	5,335	10.33	+3.65	$6,665.67
Green	Attila Nagy	2,389	4.63	–4.49	$2,586.35
Liberal	Nicole Hankel	1,898	3.68	–2.24	$7,363.82
Progressive Canadian	Brad Carrigan	1,754	3.40	–	none listed
Christian Heritage	Marc Slingerland	252	0.49	–0.44	none listed
Total valid votes/expense limit		51,635	99.70	–	$101,429.41
Total rejected ballots		157	0.30	+0.10	
Turnout		51,792	60.42	+4.03	
Eligible voters		85,720			
Conservative hold		Swing		+1.76	
Source: Elections Canada

2008 Canadian federal election
Party	Candidate	Votes	%	±%	Expenditures
Conservative	Ted Menzies	35,328	77.36	+1.91	$50,655.33
Green	Jared McCollum	4,161	9.11	+2.93	$3,884.28
New Democratic	Stan Knowlton	3,053	6.69	+0.15	$3,896.53
Liberal	Isabel Paynter	2,703	5.92	–3.32	$7,254.78
Christian Heritage	Marc Slingerland	422	0.92	–	none listed
Total valid votes/expense limit		45,667	99.80	–	$96,192.63
Total rejected ballots		91	0.20	–0.07	
Turnout		45,758	56.39	–9.26	
Eligible voters		81,141			
Conservative hold		Swing		+2.42	
Source: Elections Canada

2006 Canadian federal election
Party	Candidate	Votes	%	±%	Expenditures
Conservative	Ted Menzies	37,534	75.45	+0.69	$42,057.50
Liberal	Bernie Kennedy	4,596	9.24	–2.86	$490.00
New Democratic	Joyce Thomas	3,251	6.54	+0.04	$307.97
Green	Larry Ashmore	3,075	6.18	–0.46	$2,131.95
Independent	Myron Wolf Child	1,055	2.12	–	none listed
Canadian Action	Catherine Whelan Costen	235	0.47	–	$2,416.83
Total valid votes/expense limit		49,746	99.73	–	$86,908.20
Total rejected ballots		133	0.27	+0.01	
Turnout		49,879	65.65	+5.62	
Eligible voters		75,975			
Conservative hold		Swing		+1.77	
Source: Elections Canada

2004 Canadian federal election
Party	Candidate	Votes	%	±%	Expenditures
Conservative	Ted Menzies	32,232	74.76	–9.12	$45,371.55
Liberal	Chris Shade	5,214	12.09	+2.68	$19,655.19
Green	Laurel Denise Fadeeff	2,865	6.65	–	$1,106.86
New Democratic	Joyce Thomas	2,802	6.50	–0.20	$1,337.06
Total valid votes/expense limit		43,113	99.74	–	$83,435.76
Total rejected ballots		111	0.26	+0.00	
Turnout		43,224	60.03	–2.74	
Eligible voters		72,008			
Conservative hold		Swing		–	
Source: Elections Canada

2000 Canadian federal election
Party	Candidate	Votes	%	±%	Expenditures
Alliance	Grant Hill	30,783	70.05	+2.03	$47,809
Progressive Conservative	Cyril R. Abbott	6,079	13.83	–1.76	$9,380
Liberal	Marlene Lamontagne	4,137	9.41	–2.20	$5,561
New Democratic	Duane Good Striker	2,945	6.70	+2.65	$524
Total valid votes		43,944	99.74		
Total rejected ballots		116	0.26	+0.11	
Turnout		44,060	62.77	+6.20	
Eligible voters		70,197			
Alliance hold		Swing		+1.90	
Source: Elections Canada

1997 Canadian federal election
Party	Candidate	Votes	%	±%	Expenditures
Reform	Grant Hill	24,225	68.02	+4.75	$40,614
Progressive Conservative	Tim Anderson	5,555	15.60	–1.69	$32,047
Liberal	Christopher Paton-Gay	4,137	11.62	–4.84	$41,335
New Democratic	Stan Knowlton	1,444	4.06	+2.16	$2,140
Natural Law	Diane Shapka	253	0.71	+0.18	none listed
Total valid votes		35,614	99.85		
Total rejected ballots		53	0.15	–0.06	
Turnout		35,667	56.57	–14.32	
Eligible voters		63,052			
Reform hold		Swing		+3.22	
Source: Elections Canada

1993 Canadian federal election
Party	Candidate	Votes	%	±%
Reform	Grant Hill	23,828	63.27	+32.05
Progressive Conservative	Ken Hughes	6,512	17.29	–33.23
Liberal	Roy Whitney	6,196	16.45	+7.01
New Democratic	Susanne Abildgaard	712	1.89	–6.69
Green	Warren Smith	213	0.57	–
Natural Law	Gloria Hansen	200	0.53	–
Total valid votes		37,661	99.79	
Total rejected ballots		80	0.21	+0.00
Turnout		37,741	70.89	–5.57
Eligible voters		53,240		
Reform gain from Progressive Conservative		Swing		+32.64
Source: Elections Canada

1988 Canadian federal election
Party	Candidate	Votes	%	±%
Progressive Conservative	Ken Hughes	16,989	50.52	–
Reform	Ken Copithorne	10,498	31.22	–
Liberal	Ernie Patterson	3,175	9.44	–
New Democratic	Gary Taje	2,884	8.58	–
Commonwealth of Canada	F.B. Tex Hover	84	0.25	–
Total valid votes		33,630	99.79	
Total rejected ballots		70	0.21	–
Turnout		33,700	76.46	–
Eligible voters		44,076		
Progressive Conservative hold		Swing		–
Source: Elections Canada

=== 1908–1968 ===
1965 Canadian federal election
Party	Candidate	Votes	%	±%
Progressive Conservative	Lawrence Kindt	8,706	44.32	–1.00
Social Credit	Ernie Patterson	6,487	33.03	–3.08
Liberal	Bill Matheson	3,142	16.00	+2.72
New Democratic	Sam Brown	1,307	6.65	+1.36
Total valid votes		19,642	99.59	
Total rejected ballots		80	0.41	+0.02
Turnout		19,722	77.98	–5.61
Eligible voters		25,291		
Progressive Conservative hold		Swing		+2.04
Source: Library of Parliament

1963 Canadian federal election
Party	Candidate	Votes	%	±%
Progressive Conservative	Lawrence Kindt	9,785	45.32	–0.52
Social Credit	Ernie Patterson	7,795	36.11	+2.84
Liberal	Robert Bostrom	2,866	13.28	–1.68
New Democratic	John Purrier Griffin	1,143	5.29	–0.65
Total valid votes		21,589	99.61	
Total rejected ballots		85	0.39	–0.28
Turnout		21,674	83.59	+2.85
Eligible voters		25,928		
Progressive Conservative hold		Swing		–1.68
Source: Library of Parliament

1962 Canadian federal election
Party	Candidate	Votes	%	±%
Progressive Conservative	Lawrence Kindt	9,605	45.84	–13.19
Social Credit	Ernie Patterson	6,970	33.27	+5.40
Liberal	James A. Coutts	3,133	14.95	+5.50
New Democratic	John Purrier Griffin	1,245	5.94	+2.29
Total valid votes		20,953	99.33	
Total rejected ballots		142	0.67	+0.12
Turnout		21,095	80.74	+0.91
Eligible voters		26,128		
Progressive Conservative hold		Swing		–9.29
Source: Library of Parliament

1958 Canadian federal election
Party	Candidate	Votes	%	±%
Progressive Conservative	Lawrence Kindt	11,911	59.03	+32.69
Social Credit	Ernest George Hansell	5,623	27.87	–15.81
Liberal	James Derrick	1,907	9.45	–15.34
Co-operative Commonwealth	John Purrier Griffin	736	3.65	–1.55
Total valid votes		20,177	99.45	
Total rejected ballots		112	0.55	–0.09
Turnout		20,289	79.83	+3.12
Eligible voters		25,415		
Progressive Conservative gain from Social Credit		Swing		+24.25
Source: Library of Parliament

1957 Canadian federal election
Party	Candidate	Votes	%	±%
Social Credit	Ernest George Hansell	8,411	43.67	–4.71
Progressive Conservative	Lawrence Kindt	5,073	26.34	+6.15
Liberal	Gordon Lloyd Burton	4,774	24.79	+0.84
Co-operative Commonwealth	John Purrier Griffin	1,001	5.20	+1.18
Total valid votes		19,259	99.36	
Total rejected ballots		124	0.64	–0.12
Turnout		19,383	76.71	+9.70
Eligible voters		25,267		
Social Credit hold		Swing		–5.43
Source: Library of Parliament

1953 Canadian federal election
Party	Candidate	Votes	%	±%
Social Credit	Ernest George Hansell	8,685	48.39	+3.30
Liberal	John Joseph McIntyre	4,298	23.95	–0.79
Progressive Conservative	Warren Cecil Cooper	3,625	20.20	+0.04
Co-operative Commonwealth	Leslie Norman Howard	721	4.02	–6.00
Labor–Progressive	Anthony Patera	620	3.45	–
Total valid votes		17,949	99.24	
Total rejected ballots		138	0.76	–0.50
Turnout		18,087	67.01	–4.35
Eligible voters		26,992		
Social Credit hold		Swing		+2.05
Source: Library of Parliament

1949 Canadian federal election
Party	Candidate	Votes	%	±%
Social Credit	Ernest George Hansell	7,411	45.09	+7.93
Liberal	Alfred Gladstone Lewis	4,066	24.74	+9.39
Progressive Conservative	Stanley Wyatt	3,314	20.16	–2.83
Co-operative Commonwealth	John Purrier Griffin	1,647	10.02	–5.03
Total valid votes		16,438	98.74	
Total rejected ballots		210	1.26	+0.15
Turnout		16,648	71.36	–7.25
Eligible voters		23,330		
Social Credit hold		Swing		+5.38
Source: Library of Parliament

1945 Canadian federal election
Party	Candidate	Votes	%	±%
Social Credit	Ernest George Hansell	6,342	37.16	–2.69
Progressive Conservative	Stanley Wyatt	3,924	22.99	+4.80
Liberal	Alfred Gladstone Lewis	2,620	15.35	–13.56
Co-operative Commonwealth	Otto Edward Wobick	2,569	15.05	+2.00
Labor–Progressive	William Austin Arland	1,613	9.45	–
Total valid votes		17,068	98.89	
Total rejected ballots		191	1.11	–0.12
Turnout		17,259	78.61	+6.01
Eligible voters		21,956		
Social Credit hold		Swing		–
Source: Library of Parliament

1940 Canadian federal election
Party	Candidate	Votes	%	±%
Social Credit	Ernest George Hansell	6,655	39.84	–8.74
Liberal	Francis Olestes McKenna	4,829	28.91	+16.74
National Government	Grier Rider Davis	3,039	18.19	+3.68
Co-operative Commonwealth	Ruth House McBride	2,180	13.05	–11.68
Total valid votes		16,703	98.77	
Total rejected ballots		208	1.23	+0.43
Turnout		16,911	72.60	+1.31
Eligible voters		23,293		
Social Credit hold		Swing		–
Source: Library of Parliament

1935 Canadian federal election
Party	Candidate	Votes	%	±%
Social Credit	Ernest George Hansell	7,028	48.58	–
Co-operative Commonwealth	George Gibson Coote	3,577	24.73	–28.32
Conservative	John Walter Matthewson	2,100	14.52	–32.44
Liberal	Francis Olestes McKenna	1,761	12.17	–
Total valid votes		14,466	99.20	
Total rejected ballots		117	0.80	+0.80
Turnout		14,583	71.29	+2.29
Eligible voters		20,456		
Social Credit gain from United Farmers of Alberta		Swing		–
Source: Library of Parliament

1930 Canadian federal election
Party	Candidate	Votes	%	±%
United Farmers of Alberta	George Gibson Coote	6,897	53.05	–13.33
Conservative	Joseph Duncan Matheson	6,105	46.95	+13.33
Total valid votes		13,002	100.00	
Total rejected ballots		unknown		
Turnout		13,002	69.00	+8.31
Eligible voters		18,844		
United Farmers of Alberta hold		Swing		–13.33
Source: Library of Parliament

1926 Canadian federal election
Party	Candidate	Votes	%	±%
United Farmers of Alberta	George Gibson Coote	6,840	66.38	+21.94
Conservative	John Herron	3,465	33.62	–4.49
Total valid votes		10,305	100.00	
Total rejected ballots		unknown		
Turnout		10,305	60.69	–7.44
Eligible voters		16,981		
United Farmers of Alberta gain from Progressive		Swing		–
Source: Library of Parliament

1925 Canadian federal election
Party	Candidate	Votes	%	±%
Progressive	George Gibson Coote	4,943	44.44	–15.33
Conservative	John Herron	4,239	38.11	+20.76
Liberal	Thomas Milnes	1,941	17.45	+8.40
Total valid votes		11,123	100.00	
Total rejected ballots		unknown		
Turnout		11,123	68.13	+0.91
Eligible voters		16,327		
Progressive hold		Swing		–18.04
Source: Library of Parliament

1921 Canadian federal election
Party	Candidate	Votes	%	±%
Progressive	George Gibson Coote	6,086	59.77	–
Conservative	Hugh Murray Shaw	1,767	17.35	–41.67
Labour	James Fairhurst	1,407	13.82	–
Liberal	Joseph E. Gillis	922	9.06	–
Total valid votes		10,182	100.00	
Total rejected ballots		unknown		
Turnout		10,182	67.22	–24.08
Eligible voters		15,148		
Progressive gain from Government (Unionist)		Swing		–
Source: Library of Parliament

1917 Canadian federal election
Party	Candidate	Votes	%	±%
Government (Unionist)	Hugh Murray Shaw	5,128	59.02	–
Opposition (Laurier Liberals)	Donald Randolph McIvor	2,610	30.04	–
Nonpartisan League	Stephen Thorne Marshall	950	10.94	–
Total valid votes		8,688	100.00	
Total rejected ballots		unknown		
Turnout		8,688	91.30	+22.10
Eligible voters		9,516		
Government (Unionist) gain from Liberal		Swing		–
Source: Library of Parliament

1911 Canadian federal election
Party	Candidate	Votes	%	±%
Liberal	David Warnock	3,660	49.44	+7.09
Liberal–Conservative	John Herron	2,841	38.38	–8.67
Independent	Edmund Fulcher	902	12.18	–
Total valid votes		7,403	100.00	
Total rejected ballots		unknown		
Turnout		7,403	69.20	–
Eligible voters		10,698		
Liberal gain from Liberal–Conservative		Swing		+7.88
Source: Library of Parliament

1908 Canadian federal election
Party	Candidate	Votes	%	±%
Liberal–Conservative	John Herron	2,935	47.04	–
Liberal	Allan Ban Macdonald	2,642	42.35	–
Independent	John Harrington	662	10.61	–
Total valid votes		6,239	100.00	
Total rejected ballots		unknown		
Turnout		6,239	–	–
Eligible voters				
Liberal–Conservative notional gain		Swing		–
Source: Library of Parliament

== See also ==
- List of Canadian electoral districts
- Historical federal electoral districts of Canada
