= Grant Hill (politician) =

Canadian politician (born 1943)

The Honourable Grant Hill PC

Leader of the Opposition
- In office January 9, 2004 – March 20, 2004
- Monarch: Elizabeth II
- Prime Minister: Paul Martin
- Preceded by: Stephen Harper
- Succeeded by: Stephen Harper

Member of Parliament for Macleod
- In office October 25, 1993 – June 28, 2004
- Preceded by: Ken Hughes
- Succeeded by: Ted Menzies

Personal details
- Born: September 20, 1943 (age 83) Montreal, Quebec, Canada
- Party: Conservative (2004–present)
- Other political affiliations: Reform (1993–2000); Canadian Alliance (2000–2004)
- Spouse: Sue Grant
- Children: 7
- Occupation: Physician; surgeon; politician
- Profession: Physician

Grant Hill PC (born September 20, 1943) is a Canadian retired physician, surgeon, and politician who served as the interim leader of the Official Opposition in the House of Commons from January to March 2004. A member of the Reform Party, the Canadian Alliance, and later the Conservative Party of Canada, he represented the Alberta riding of Macleod as a member of Parliament (MP) from 1993 to 2004. Though he briefly led the opposition in the House of Commons, the official interim leader of the party was Senator John Lynch-Staunton.

== Early career ==
Before entering politics, Grant worked as a medical doctor in Okotoks, Alberta. He was recruited to the town in 1970 by Dr. Morris Gibson to take over his medical practice. The two later co-founded the Sheep River Medical Clinic, where Grant practiced for many years.

== Political career ==
=== Municipal politics (1974–1977) ===
Grant first entered politics at the municipal level, serving as a town councillor in Okotoks from 1974 to 1977.

=== Reform party (1993–2000) ===
Grant was first elected to Parliament in the 1993 federal election as a member of the Reform Party, representing Macleod. He was re-elected in 1997.

=== Canadian Alliance and leadership Bid (2000–2004) ===
Following the Reform Party’s merger into the Canadian Alliance in 2000, Grant was re-elected in that year’s federal election. In 2002, he ran in the Canadian Alliance leadership election, placing fourth.

In 2004, he became the interim leader of the Official Opposition in the House of Commons after Stephen Harper was elected party leader, though the official interim leader of the party was Senator John Lynch-Staunton.

=== Conservative Party and retirement from politics (2004) ===
After the 2003 merger of the Canadian Alliance and Progressive Conservative Party, Grant briefly sat as a Conservative MP before retiring. He did not seek re-election in 2004.

== Personal life ==
After leaving politics, Grant returned to his medical practice in Okotoks, Alberta. He worked at the Urgent Care clinic in the town until his retirement. Grant is also an avid antique car collector and is involved in classic car shows. In 1975, he helped start the Okotoks Collector Car Auction, which is now considered the longest-running car auction in Canada.

In 2014, the town of Okotoks named Dr. Grant Hill Park in his honour, recognizing his contributions as both a doctor and a public servant. Grant expressed gratitude for the recognition, noting that it was meaningful to receive such an honour during his lifetime.

He is married with a large family and is a member of the Church of Jesus Christ of Latter-day Saints.

== Honours ==
On February 19, 2004, Grant was sworn into the Queen's Privy Council for Canada, granting him the honorific title The Honourable and the post-nominal letters PC for life.
