= Foothills (electoral district) =

Federal electoral district in Alberta, Canada

Alberta electoral district
- Interactive map of riding boundaries from the 2025 federal election

Federal electoral district
- Legislature: House of Commons
MP
John Barlow
Conservative
- District created: 2013
- First contested: 2015
- Last contested: 2025
- District webpage: profile, map

Demographics
- Population (2011): 105,515
- Electors (2019): 86,027
- Area (km²): 20,877
- Pop. density (per km²): 5.1
- Census division(s): Division No. 3, Division No. 6, Division No. 15
- Census subdivision(s): Okotoks, Foothills, High River, Willow Creek, Crowsnest Pass, Cardston County (part), Blood (Kainai Nation), Vulcan County (part), Claresholm, Pincher Creek

Foothills is a federal electoral district in Alberta, Canada, that has been represented in the House of Commons of Canada since 2015.

== History ==
Foothills was created by the 2012 federal electoral boundaries redistribution and was legally defined in the 2013 representation order. It came into effect upon the call of the 42nd Canadian federal election, scheduled for October 19, 2015. It was created out of the bulk of Macleod, plus very small parts of Lethbridge (Waterton Lakes National Park) and Calgary Southwest (a small section north of Spruce Meadows).

The name of the riding refers to the Rocky Mountain Foothills, which spread across southwestern Alberta from the Continental Divide at the British Columbia border.

== Demographics ==
Panethnic groups in Foothills (2011−2021)
Panethnic group	2021		2016		2011	
Panethnic group	Pop.	%	Pop.	%	Pop.	%
European (Note: Statistic includes all persons that did not make up part of a visible minority or an indigenous identity.)	95,885	86.12%	96,045	87.48%	91,880	89.76%
Indigenous	7,035	6.32%	7,030	6.4%	6,575	6.42%
Southeast Asian (Note: Statistic includes total responses of "Filipino" and "Southeast Asian" under visible minority section on census.)	3,430	3.08%	2,465	2.25%	1,150	1.12%
South Asian	1,280	1.15%	1,225	1.12%	835	0.82%
East Asian (Note: Statistic includes total responses of "Chinese", "Korean", and "Japanese" under visible minority section on census.)	1,145	1.03%	1,305	1.19%	915	0.89%
Latin American	800	0.72%	520	0.47%	305	0.3%
African	970	0.87%	655	0.6%	480	0.47%
Middle Eastern (Note: Statistic includes total responses of "West Asian" and "Arab" under visible minority section on census.)	355	0.32%	205	0.19%	65	0.06%
Other/Multiracial (Note: Statistic includes total responses of "Visible minority, n.i.e." and "Multiple visible minorities" under visible minority section on census.)	440	0.4%	335	0.31%	170	0.17%
Total responses	111,340	96.72%	109,785	96.96%	102,365	97.01%
Total population	115,118	100%	113,227	100%	105,515	100%
Notes: Totals greater than 100% due to multiple origin responses. Demographics based on 2012 Canadian federal electoral redistribution riding boundaries.

== Members of Parliament ==
This riding has elected the following members of the House of Commons of Canada:

Parliament	Years	Member	Party
Foothills; Riding created from Calgary Southwest, Lethbridge and Macleod
42nd	2015–2019	John Barlow	Conservative
43rd	2019–2021	John Barlow	Conservative
44th	2021–2025	John Barlow	Conservative
45th	2025–present	John Barlow	Conservative

== Election results ==
View source data.
Graph of election results in Foothills (minor parties that never got 2% of the vote or didn't run consistently are omitted)

=== 2023 representation order ===
2025 Canadian federal election
Party	Candidate	Votes	%	±%	Expenditures
Conservative	John Barlow	54,874	76.33	+7.90	$47,026.09
Liberal	John Bruinsma	13,706	19.07	+12.13	$7,907.92
New Democratic	Kaitte Aurora	1,923	2.68	–8.72	none listed
People's	Paul O'Halloran	796	1.11	–7.10	$1,007.34
Green	Emma Hoberg	589	0.82	–0.50	none listed
Total valid votes/expense limit		71,888	99.53	–	$150,002.51
Total rejected ballots		336	0.47	+0.08	
Turnout		72,224	74.34	+2.67	
Eligible voters		97,153			
Conservative notional hold		Swing		N/A	
Source: Elections Canada

2021 federal election redistributed results
Party	Vote	%
Conservative	41,847	68.43
New Democratic	6,968	11.39
People's	5,024	8.21
Liberal	4,246	6.94
Green	808	1.32
Others	2,264	3.70

=== 2013 representation order ===
2021 Canadian federal election
Party	Candidate	Votes	%	±%	Expenditures
Conservative	John Barlow	44,456	69.23	–12.90	$30,501.15
New Democratic	Michelle Traxel	7,117	11.08	+5.34	none listed
People's	Daniel Hunter	5,111	7.96	+5.37	none listed
Liberal	Paula Shimp	4,441	6.92	+1.04	$3,499.22
Maverick	Josh Wylie	2,289	3.57	–	$16,164.90
Green	Brett Rogers	802	1.25	–2.41	$48.80
Total valid votes/expense limit		64,216	99.61	–	$126,382.56
Total rejected ballots		251	0.39	–0.05	
Turnout		64,467	71.67	–3.30	
Eligible voters		89,956			
Conservative hold		Swing		N/A	
Source: Elections Canada

2019 Canadian federal election
Party	Candidate	Votes	%	±%	Expenditures
Conservative	John Barlow	53,872	82.13	+6.43	$47,839.43
Liberal	Cheryl Moller	3,856	5.88	–7.48	$3,716.22
New Democratic	Mickail Hendi	3,767	5.74	–0.68	none listed
Green	Bridget Lacey	2,398	3.66	+0.40	$1,668.77
People's	Greg Hession	1,698	2.59	–	$11,956.99
Total valid votes/expense limit		65,591	99.56	–	$120,864.76
Total rejected ballots		290	0.44	+0.21	
Turnout		65,881	74.97	+1.92	
Eligible voters		87,873			
Conservative hold		Swing		+7.05	
Source: Elections Canada

2015 Canadian federal election
Party	Candidate	Votes	%	±%	Expenditures
Conservative	John Barlow	46,166	75.70	–2.12	$66,508.37
Liberal	Tanya MacPherson	8,149	13.36	+9.84	$3,837.36
New Democratic	Alison Thompson	3,919	6.43	–3.67	$9,096.95
Green	Romy Tittel	1,983	3.25	–1.50	$16,227.65
Libertarian	Cory Morgan	424	0.70	–	none listed
Christian Heritage	Marc Slingerland	345	0.57	–	$9,192.08
Total valid votes/expense limit		60,986	99.77	–	$237,098.11
Total rejected ballots		141	0.23	–	
Turnout		61,127	73.05	–	
Eligible voters		83,675			
Conservative hold		Swing		–5.98	
Source: Elections Canada

2011 federal election redistributed results
Party	Vote	%
Conservative	35,900	77.82
New Democratic	4,656	10.09
Green	2,193	4.75
Liberal	1,624	3.52
Others	1,758	3.81

== See also ==
- List of Canadian electoral districts
- Historical federal electoral districts of Canada
