= John Barlow (Canadian politician) =

Canadian politician (born 1971)

John Barlow MP
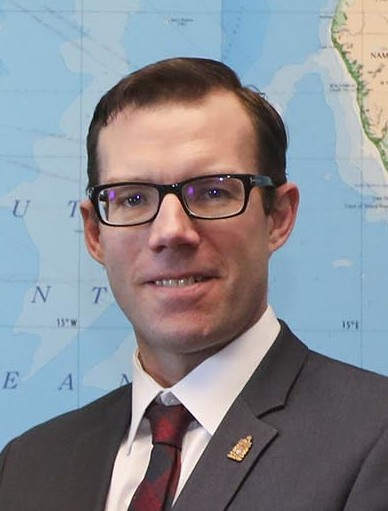
- Barlow in 2018

Member of Parliament for Foothills (Macleod; 2014–2015)
- Incumbent
- Assumed office June 30, 2014
- Preceded by: Ted Menzies

Personal details
- Born: October 13, 1971 (age 54) Regina, Saskatchewan, Canada
- Party: Conservative
- Other political affiliations: Alberta Progressive Conservative (2012)
- Profession: Politician; newspaper editor

John Barlow (born October 13, 1971) is a Canadian politician who has served as a member of Parliament (MP) since 2014. A member of the Conservative Party, Barlow has represented Foothills since 2015 and was first elected to represent Macleod in a 2014 by-election.

Prior to his election, Barlow was editor of the Western Wheel, a newspaper in Okotoks, Alberta.

== Political career ==
Barlow had previously run for the Progressive Conservative Association of Alberta in Highwood during the 2012 Alberta general election, losing to Wildrose leader Danielle Smith. He ran and was elected in the riding of Macleod in a 2014 federal by-election resulting from the retirement of MP Ted Menzies.

He was re-elected after the 2015 election, in the riding of Foothills, essentially a reconfigured version of his old riding and was re-elected again on following the 2019 election.

=== Deputy Critic for Employment, Workforce Development, and Labour (2015–2016) ===
In 2015, Barlow was appointed Deputy Critic for Employment, Workforce Development, and Labour by newly appointed interim leader of the Conservative Party, Rona Ambrose. He was also elected Vice Chair on the Standing Committee on Natural Resources.

=== Interprovincial Trade Critic (2016–2017) ===
In 2016, Barlow was appointed as Interprovincial Trade Critic by Rona Ambrose, the interim Conservative leader. As critic, he focused on the campaign, #FreeTheBeer, which is intended to build public pressure for the provinces to ratify a free trade deal for Canada, specifically focused on alcohol trade between provinces.

Also in 2016, Barlow tabled his private member's bill C-351, "An Act to amend the Importation of Intoxicating Liquors Act and the Excise Act, 2001 (importation)". If passed, this legislation would:

- allow producers to sell their product directly to consumers anywhere in Canada without permission of a provincial liquor board, and
- allow a person to transport alcohol from one province to another for personal use.

The Bill did not reach second reading as its provisions were adopted in that year's budget implementation bill.

=== Associate Shadow Minister for Agriculture and Agri-Food (2017–2018) ===
In 2018, newly elected leader of the Conservative Party, Andrew Scheer, appointed Barlow as Shadow Minister for Agriculture and Agri-Food (Associate). Simultaneously, Barlow also sat on the Standing Committee on Agriculture and Agri-Food.

=== Shadow Minister of Employment, Workforce Development and Labour (2018–2019) ===
In 2018, Scheer appointed Barlow as Shadow Minister of Employment, Workforce Development, and Labour. He was also elected as the Vice-Chair for the Standing Committee on Human Resources, Skills and Social Development and the Status of Persons with Disabilities.

=== Shadow Minister for Agriculture, Agri-Food, and Food Security (2019–2020, 2021–present) ===
In 2019, Scheer appointed Barlow as Shadow Minister for Agriculture and Agri-Food. He was elected Vice Chair of the committee on Agriculture.

In 2020, newly elected leader, Erin O'Toole replaced Barlow in this role with Lianne Rood. During this time, Barlow served as a member of the standing committee on Health.

In 2021, O'Toole, appointed Barlow as Shadow Minister for Agriculture, Agri-Food, and Food Security once again for the 44th Parliament. He was again elected as Vice-Chair of the Standing committee on Agriculture. Barlow retained this role and was reappointed under Pierre Poilievre's leadership.

His Private Member's Bill, C-275, An Act to amend the Health of Animals Act (biosecurity on farms), passed the House of Commons in 2023. The bill would amend "the Health of Animals Act to make it an offence to enter, without lawful authority or excuse, a place in which animals are kept if doing so could reasonably be expected to result in the exposure of the animals to a disease or toxic substance that is capable of affecting or contaminating them."

He was elected as the vice chair of the Canadian House of Commons Standing Committee on Agriculture and Agri-Food in the 45th Canadian Parliament.

At the time of the 2025 Canadian federal election, he lived in High River, Alberta.

== Electoral record ==
=== Federal ===
2025 Canadian federal election: Foothills
Party	Candidate	Votes	%	±%	Expenditures
Conservative	John Barlow	54,874	76.33	+7.90	$47,026.09
Liberal	John Bruinsma	13,706	19.07	+12.13	$7,907.92
New Democratic	Kaitte Aurora	1,923	2.68	–8.72	none listed
People's	Paul O'Halloran	796	1.11	–7.10	$1,007.34
Green	Emma Hoberg	589	0.82	–0.50	none listed
Total valid votes/expense limit		71,888	99.53	–	$150,002.51
Total rejected ballots		336	0.47	+0.08	
Turnout		72,224	74.34	+2.67	
Eligible voters		97,153			
Conservative notional hold		Swing		N/A	
Source: Elections Canada

2021 Canadian federal election: Foothills
Party	Candidate	Votes	%	±%	Expenditures
Conservative	John Barlow	44,456	69.23	–12.90	$30,501.15
New Democratic	Michelle Traxel	7,117	11.08	+5.34	none listed
People's	Daniel Hunter	5,111	7.96	+5.37	none listed
Liberal	Paula Shimp	4,441	6.92	+1.04	$3,499.22
Maverick	Josh Wylie	2,289	3.57	–	$16,164.90
Green	Brett Rogers	802	1.25	–2.41	$48.80
Total valid votes/expense limit		64,216	99.61	–	$126,382.56
Total rejected ballots		251	0.39	–0.05	
Turnout		64,467	71.67	–3.30	
Eligible voters		89,956			
Conservative hold		Swing		N/A	
Source: Elections Canada

2019 Canadian federal election: Foothills
Party	Candidate	Votes	%	±%	Expenditures
Conservative	John Barlow	53,872	82.13	+6.43	$47,839.43
Liberal	Cheryl Moller	3,856	5.88	–7.48	$3,716.22
New Democratic	Mickail Hendi	3,767	5.74	–0.68	none listed
Green	Bridget Lacey	2,398	3.66	+0.40	$1,668.77
People's	Greg Hession	1,698	2.59	–	$11,956.99
Total valid votes/expense limit		65,591	99.56	–	$120,864.76
Total rejected ballots		290	0.44	+0.21	
Turnout		65,881	74.97	+1.92	
Eligible voters		87,873			
Conservative hold		Swing		+7.05	
Source: Elections Canada

2015 Canadian federal election: Foothills
Party	Candidate	Votes	%	±%	Expenditures
Conservative	John Barlow	46,166	75.70	–2.12	$66,508.37
Liberal	Tanya MacPherson	8,149	13.36	+9.84	$3,837.36
New Democratic	Alison Thompson	3,919	6.43	–3.67	$9,096.95
Green	Romy Tittel	1,983	3.25	–1.50	$16,227.65
Libertarian	Cory Morgan	424	0.70	–	none listed
Christian Heritage	Marc Slingerland	345	0.57	–	$9,192.08
Total valid votes/expense limit		60,986	99.77	–	$237,098.11
Total rejected ballots		141	0.23	–	
Turnout		61,127	73.05	–	
Eligible voters		83,675			
Conservative hold		Swing		–5.98	
Source: Elections Canada

Canadian federal by-election, June 30, 2014: Macleod Resignation of Ted Menzies
Party	Candidate	Votes	%	±%	Expenditures
Conservative	John Barlow	12,616	69.16	–8.33	$66,422.40
Liberal	Dustin Fuller	3,092	16.95	+13.27	$52,667.62
Green	Larry Ashmore	991	5.43	+0.81	$166.57
Christian Heritage	David J. Reimer	774	4.24	+3.75	$13,438.51
New Democratic	Aileen Burke	770	4.22	–6.11	$399.13
Total valid votes/expense limit		18,243	99.56	–	$114,481.41
Total rejected ballots		81	0.44	+0.14	
Turnout		18,324	19.85	–40.57	
Eligible voters		92,332			
Conservative hold		Swing		–10.80	
Source: Elections Canada

=== Provincial ===
2012 Alberta general election: Highwood
Party	Candidate	Votes	%	±%
Wildrose Alliance	Danielle Smith	10,094	52.59%	40.74%
Progressive Conservative	John Barlow	8,159	42.51%	−22.60%
Liberal	Keegan Gibson	547	2.85%	−11.05%
New Democratic	Miles Dato	392	2.04%	−1.26%
Total		19,192	–	–
Rejected, spoiled and declined		50	33	10
Eligible electors / turnout		32,659	58.95%	17.86%
Wildrose Alliance gain from Progressive Conservative		Swing		−20.56%
Source(s) Source: "63 - Highwood, 2012 Alberta general election". officialresults.elections.ab.ca. Elections Alberta. Chief Electoral Officer (2012). The Report of the Chief Electoral Officer on the 2011 Provincial Enumeration and Monday, April 23, 2012 Provincial General Election of the Twenty-eighth Legislative Assembly (PDF) (Report). Edmonton, Alta.: Elections Alberta. pp. 378–382. Archived (PDF) from the original on May 6, 2021.
