= Edmonton (federal electoral district) =

Former electoral district in Canada

Alberta electoral district
- Edmonton in the 1905 representation order

Defunct federal electoral district
- Legislature: House of Commons
- District created: 1903
- District abolished: 1917
- First contested: 1904
- Last contested: 1911

Edmonton was a federal electoral district represented in the House of Commons of Canada. When created in 1903 it was located in the North-West Territories. Following the creation of the provinces of Alberta and Saskatchewan in 1905, the riding took in land in both the provinces, then after 1907 just in Alberta. It was abolished in 1914 when it was redistributed into Edmonton East, Edmonton West and Strathcona ridings.

== Members of Parliament ==
The only person ever to represent this riding was Edmonton Liberal newspaper publisher Frank Oliver who was Minister of the Interior at a time when Alberta was being settled by European immigrants and when Alberta became a province in 1905.

Edmonton
| Parliament | Years | Member | Party |
|---|---|---|---|
| 10th | 1904–1908 | Frank Oliver | Liberal |
| 11th | 1908–1911 | Frank Oliver | Liberal |
| 12th | 1911–1917 | Frank Oliver | Liberal |
District redistributed into Edmonton East, Edmonton West, and Strathcona

== Election results ==
=== 1911 ===
1911 Canadian federal election
| Party | Candidate | Votes | % | ±% |
|---|---|---|---|---|
| Liberal | Frank Oliver | 7,070 | 56.76 | –7.53 |
| Conservative | William Antrobus Griesbach | 4,832 | 38.79 | +3.08 |
| Independent | Alfred Farmilo | 555 | 4.46 | – |
| Total valid votes | | 12,457 | 100.00 | |
| Total rejected ballots | | unknown | | |
| Turnout | | 12,457 | 63.44 | – |
| Eligible voters | | 19,637 | | |
| Liberal hold | | Swing | | –5.31 |
Source: Library of Parliament

=== 1908 ===
1908 Canadian federal election
| Party | Candidate | Votes | % | ±% |
|---|---|---|---|---|
| Liberal | Frank Oliver | 5,212 | 64.29 | –5.56 |
| Conservative | James Hyndman | 2,895 | 35.71 | +5.56 |
| Total valid votes | | 8,107 | 100.00 | |
| Total rejected ballots | | unknown | | |
| Turnout | | 8,107 | – | – |
| Eligible voters | | | | |
| Liberal hold | | Swing | | –5.56 |
Source: Library of Parliament

=== 1905 by-election ===
Canadian federal by-election, April 25, 1905 Ministerial By-Election for Frank Oliver
| Party | Candidate | Votes | % | ±% |
|---|---|---|---|---|
| Liberal | Frank Oliver | acclaimed | – | – |
| Liberal hold | | Swing | | – |
Source: Library of Parliament

=== 1904 ===
1904 Canadian federal election
| Party | Candidate | Votes | % | ±% |
|---|---|---|---|---|
| Liberal | Frank Oliver | 3,535 | 69.85 | – |
| Conservative | Richard Secord | 1,526 | 30.15 | – |
| Total valid votes | | 5,061 | 100.00 | |
| Total rejected ballots | | unknown | | |
| Turnout | | 5,061 | 78.14 | – |
| Eligible voters | | 6,477 | | |
| Liberal hold | | Swing | | N/A |
Source: Library of Parliament

== See also ==
- Edmonton (provincial electoral district)
- Edmonton (N.W.T. electoral district)
- List of Canadian electoral districts
- Historical federal electoral districts of Canada
