= Ted Menzies =

Canadian politician

The Honourable Ted Menzies PC

Minister of State (Finance)
- In office January 4, 2011 – July 15, 2013
- Prime Minister: Stephen Harper
- Minister: Jim Flaherty
- Preceded by: Tom Hockin (1989)
- Succeeded by: Kevin Sorenson

Member of Parliament for Macleod
- In office June 28, 2004 – November 9, 2013
- Preceded by: Grant Hill
- Succeeded by: John Barlow

Personal details
- Born: February 18, 1952 (age 74) Claresholm, Alberta, Canada
- Party: Conservative
- Spouse: Sandy Menzies
- Profession: farmer

Ted Menzies PC (born February 18, 1952) is a former Canadian politician. He represented the electoral district of Macleod in the House of Commons of Canada and served as Minister of State for Finance before being replaced by Kevin Sorenson. He resigned from Parliament on November 6, 2013, in order to accept a position as president and CEO of CropLife Canada, a lobby group representing the agricultural biotechnology industry.

== In opposition ==
A farmer born in Claresholm, Alberta, Menzies was elected into the House of Commons of Canada as a Conservative in the 2004 federal election in the riding of Macleod. He was elected by over 27,000 votes more than the Liberal candidate, Chris Shade. During the 38th Canadian Parliament he served as the opposition critic for International Cooperation and the Canadian International Development Agency (CIDA) and the opposition critic for International Trade and Internal Trade.

== Portfolio in Conservative government ==
After the Conservative victory in the 2006 federal election, he was appointed as parliamentary secretary to Josée Verner, who was serving as the Minister for International Cooperation, Minister responsible for Official Languages, and Minister responsible for La Francophonie.

On February 10, 2006, Menzies received some news coverage when it was revealed that despite being the parliamentary secretary responsible for La Francophonie, he did not speak French. His appointment was criticized by New Democrat Yvon Godin (an Acadian).

In his defence, Menzies replied that "we have two official languages in this country. Not just French. Not just English. We have two official languages." He argued that the best means of representing both languages was with a Francophone minister with an Anglophone parliamentary secretary.

On October 10, 2007, Menzies was appointed Parliamentary Secretary to Jim Flaherty, Minister of Finance. On January 4, 2011, Menzies was promoted to Minister of State for Finance and was sworn into the Queen's Privy Council for Canada.

On July 2, 2013 he announced he would not run for re-election in the next federal election and left Cabinet. On November 6, 2013 he resigned, effective immediately, in order to accept a position in the private sector.

=== Opposition to McTeague RESP bill ===
Supported by the three opposition parties, Dan McTeague's private member bill passed through the Commons on March 5, 2008. The bill would give parents substantial tax breaks for saving education money. Under McTeague's bill, taxpayers who deposit $5,000 into a registered education savings plan (RESP) for their children's post-secondary education will earn a $5,000 tax deduction, similar to the deduction allowed for contributions to an RRSP. Under the Conservative savings plan, introduced in Finance Minister Jim Flaherty's February 26, 2008 budget, there is no deduction for annual contributions.

Menzies lashed out at the proposal and suggested McTeague explain how the government will pay for it. "I'm going to suggest to the senators that this is an uncosted $900-million proposal that the Liberals have put forward," Menzies said. The paradox of the Tories approaching the Senate wasn't lost on McTeague, who said he was "disappointed but not surprised" that the Conservatives were thinking of stalling the bill in the upper house. However other MP's such as Garth Turner strongly support McTeague's bill and call it “the greatest financial tool in a generation.”

28th Canadian Ministry (2006–2015) – Cabinet of Stephen Harper
Cabinet post (1)
Predecessor	Office	Successor
new position	Minister of State (Finance); 2011–2013	Kevin Sorenson
