= Claresholm (provincial electoral district) =

Defunct provincial electoral district in Alberta, Canada

Alberta electoral district

Defunct provincial electoral district
- Legislature: Legislative Assembly of Alberta
- District created: 1909
- District abolished: 1929
- First contested: 1909
- Last contested: 1926

Claresholm was a provincial electoral district in Alberta, Canada, mandated to return a single member to the Legislative Assembly of Alberta using the first past the post method of voting from 1909 to 1929.

== History ==
Members of the Legislative Assembly for Claresholm
Assembly	Years	Member	Party
See Macleod electoral district from 1905-1909
2nd	1909–1913	Malcolm McKenzie	Liberal
3rd	1913–1917	William Moffat	Liberal
4th	1917–1921	Louise McKinney	Alberta Non-Partisan League
5th	1921–1926	Thomas Milnes	Independent Farmer
6th	1926–1930	Gordon Beverly Walker	United Farmers
See Nanton-Claresholm electoral district from 1930-1940

The Claresholm electoral district was formed prior to the 1909 Alberta general election from the northern portion of the Macleod electoral district. The electoral district was renamed Nanton-Claresholm prior to the 1930 Alberta general election.

Malcolm McKenzie was elected the first MLA for Claresholm in the 1909 election, McKenzie was the incumbent, having been elected to the Macleod electoral district in 1905. McKenzie's margin of victory in Claresholm was much larger than he had achieved in 1905.

Premier Arthur Sifton appointed McKenzie Provincial Treasurer. In keeping with the era's custom, McKenzie responded to the cabinet appointment by resigning his seat in the legislature to contest it in a by-election. Despite his previous wide margins, in 1912 he carried Claresholm by only 14 votes.

McKenzie's tenure as treasurer was not to last long: he caught a chill while attending the convention that nominated him as the Liberals' Claresholm candidate in the 1913 election, and by the time he returned to Edmonton on March 10, 1913, he was confine to bed. He had developed peritonitis, and died from it on March 15.

In the 1917 Alberta general election, Louise McKinney was elected in Claresholm. She was the first woman sworn into the Legislative Assembly of Alberta, and the first woman elected to a legislature in the British Empire. She served in the Alberta legislature from 1917 to 1921 as a member of the Non-Partisan League. McKinney defeated Liberal incumbent and former Mayor of Claresholm William Moffat. She was one of two women elected to the Legislative Assembly in 1917, the other being Roberta MacAdams. Later McKinney was one of the Famous Five who campaigned successfully for the right of Canadian women to be appointed to the Senate.

McKinney ran for re-election in the 1921 Alberta general election as a member of the United Farmers. She was defeated by Independent Farmer candidate Thomas Milnes.

The electoral district is named for the town of Claresholm, Alberta.

In 1926, the district used instant-runoff voting to elect its MLA.

== Election results ==
=== 1900s ===
1909 Alberta general election
Party	Candidate	Votes	%	±%
Liberal	Malcolm McKenzie	696	61.87%	–
Conservative	J. F. Garrow	429	38.13%	–
Total		1,125	–	–
Rejected, spoiled and declined		N/A	–	–
Eligible electors / turnout		N/A	N/A	–
Liberal pickup new district.				
Source(s) Source: "Claresholm Official Results 1909 Alberta general election". Alberta Heritage Community Foundation.

=== 1910s ===
Alberta provincial by-election, May 27, 1912 Ministerial by-election upon Malcolm McKenzie's appointment as Provincial Treasurer
Party	Candidate	Votes	%	±%
Liberal	Malcolm McKenzie	651	50.54%	-11.33%
Conservative	D. S. MacMillan	637	49.45%	11.33%
Total		1,288	–	–
Rejected, spoiled and declined		N/A	–	–
Eligible electors / turnout		N/A	N/A	–
Liberal hold		Swing		-11.33
Source(s) "By-elections". elections.ab.ca. Elections Alberta.

1913 Alberta general election
Party	Candidate	Votes	%
Liberal	William Moffatt	496	51.08%
Conservative	D. S. McMillan	348	35.84%
Independent	G. Malshow	127	13.08%
Total		971	–
Source(s) Source: "Claresholm Official Results 1913 Alberta general election". Alberta Heritage Community Foundation.

1917 Alberta general election
Party	Candidate	Votes	%	±%
Nonpartisan League	Louise McKinney	839	55.60%	42.52%
Liberal	William Moffatt	670	44.40%	-6.68%
Total		1,509	–	–
Rejected, spoiled and declined		N/A	–	–
Eligible electors / turnout		1,884	80.10%	–
Nonpartisan League gain from Liberal		Swing		-2.02%
Source(s) Source: "Claresholm Official Results 1917 Alberta general election". Alberta Heritage Community Foundation.

=== 1920s ===
1921 Alberta general election
Party	Candidate	Votes	%	±%
Independent Farmer	Thomas Milnes	809	51.46%	-4.14%
United Farmers	Louise McKinney	763	48.54%	–
Total		1,572	–	–
Rejected, spoiled and declined		N/A	–	–
Eligible electors / turnout		N/A	N/A	–
Independent Farmer gain from Nonpartisan League		Swing		-4.14%
Source(s) Source: "Claresholm Official Results 1921 Alberta general election". Alberta Heritage Community Foundation.

1926 Alberta general election
Party	Candidate	Votes	%	±%
United Farmers	Gordon Beverly Walker	939	68.99%	20.46%
Conservative	John R. Watt	422	31.01%	–
Total		1,361	–	–
Rejected, spoiled and declined		148	–	–
Eligible electors / turnout		2,009	75.11%	–
United Farmers notional gain from Independent Farmer		Swing		17.53%
Source(s) Source: "Claresholm Official Results 1926 Alberta general election". Alberta Heritage Community Foundation.

== See also ==
- List of Alberta provincial electoral districts
- Canadian provincial electoral districts
