= Nanton-Claresholm =

Defunct provincial electoral district in Alberta, Canada

Alberta electoral district

Defunct provincial electoral district
- Legislature: Legislative Assembly of Alberta
- District created: 1930
- District abolished: 1940
- First contested: 1930
- Last contested: 1935

Nanton-Claresholm was a provincial electoral district in Alberta, Canada, mandated to return a single member to the Legislative Assembly of Alberta from 1909 to 1926.

== History ==
The Nanton-Claresholm electoral district was formed in 1930 from the Nanton and Claresholm electoral districts.

The electoral district was named for the Town of Nanton and Town of Claresholm.

Gordon Beverly Walker the United Farmers of Alberta candidate would win the first of two elections held in Nanton-Claresholm, Walker had previously served as the Member of the Legislative Assembly of Alberta for the Claresholm district from 1926, and prior to the redistribution and formation of Nanton-Claresholm.

The Nanton-Claresholm electoral district was abolished prior to the 1940 Alberta general election to form the Macleod, Okotoks-High River and Little Bow electoral districts.

Harry O. Haslam, the Alberta Social Credit candidate would defeat Walker during the final of the two elections held in Nanton-Claresholm in 1935.

Members of the Legislative Assembly for Nanton-Claresholm
Assembly	Years	Member	Party
See Claresholm electoral district from 1909-1930 and Nanton electoral district from 1909-1930
7th	1930–1935	Gordon Beverly Walker	United Farmers
8th	1935–1940	Harry O. Haslam	Social Credit
See Macleod electoral district from 1940-1993, Okotoks-High River electoral district from 1940-1971 and Little Bow electoral district from 1940-2019

== Election results ==
=== 1930 ===
1930 Alberta general election
Party	Candidate	Votes	%	±%
United Farmers	Gordon Beverly Walker	1,415	65.88%	0.00%
Conservative	W. J. Ellison	733	34.12%	0.00%
Total		2,148	–	–
Rejected, spoiled and declined		169	–	–
Eligible electors / turnout		3,544	65.38%	–
United Farmers pickup new district.				
Source(s) Source: "Nanton-Claresholm Official Results 1930 Alberta general election". Alberta Heritage Community Foundation.

=== 1935 ===
1935 Alberta general election
Party	Candidate	Votes	%	±%
Social Credit	Harry O. Haslam	1,767	55.83%	–
United Farmers	Gordon Beverly Walker	612	19.34%	-46.54%
Liberal	Thomas Milnes	517	16.33%	–
Conservative	S. Wyatt	269	8.50%	-25.63%
Total		3,165	–	–
Rejected, spoiled and declined		81	–	–
Eligible electors / turnout		3,760	86.33%	–
Social Credit gain from United Farmers		Swing		2.37%
Source(s) Source: "Nanton-Claresholm Official Results 1935 Alberta general election". Alberta Heritage Community Foundation.

== See also ==
- List of Alberta provincial electoral districts
- Nanton, Alberta, a town in southwest Alberta
- Claresholm, Alberta, a town in southwest Alberta
