= Harry O. Haslam =

Canadian politician

Harry Haslam
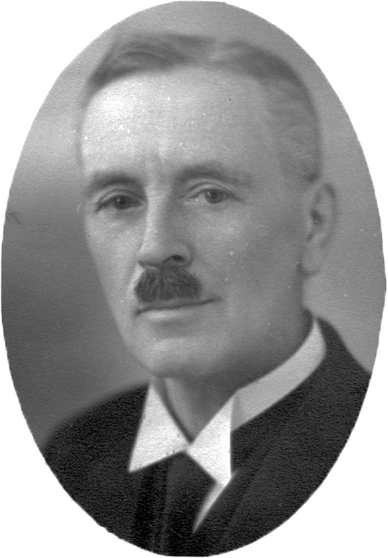

Member of the Legislative Assembly of Alberta
- In office 1935–1940
- Preceded by: Gordon Beverly Walker
- Succeeded by: District abolished
- Constituency: Nanton-Claresholm

Personal details
- Born: January 9, 1874 Summerside, Prince Edward Island
- Died: December 30, 1945 (aged 71) Claresholm, Alberta
- Party: Social Credit

Harry Oxenham Haslam (January 9, 1874 – December 30, 1945) was a provincial politician from Alberta, Canada. He served as a member of the Legislative Assembly of Alberta from 1935 to 1940, sitting with the Social Credit caucus in government.
