= LeRoy Fjordbotten =

Canadian politician

Member of the Legislative Assembly of Alberta
- In office 1979–1993
- Preceded by: Thomas Walker
- Succeeded by: District abolished
- Constituency: Macleod

Minister of Agriculture
- In office November 1982 – May 1986
- Preceded by: Dallas Schmidt
- Succeeded by: Peter Elzinga

Minister of Tourism
- In office May 1986 – 1986 or 1987
- Preceded by: Horst Schmid
- Succeeded by: Donald Sparrow

Minister of Forestry, Lands and Wildlife
- In office 1986 or 1987 – December 14, 1992
- Preceded by: Donald Sparrow
- Succeeded by: Position abolished

Personal details
- Born: November 4, 1938 Claresholm, Alberta
- Died: June 8, 2017 (aged 78) Alberta, Canada
- Party: Progressive Conservative

Edwin LeRoy Fjordbotten (November 4, 1938 – June 8, 2017) was a Canadian provincial level politician and farmer. He served as cabinet minister in the government of Alberta serving various portfolios from 1982 to 1992. He held as seat in the Legislative Assembly of Alberta as an MLA in the governing Progressive Conservative caucus from 1979 to 1993.

== Political career ==
Fjordbotten first ran for a seat to the Alberta Legislature as a Progressive Conservative candidate for the 1979 Alberta general election. He won a sizable majority defeating three other candidates to hold the electoral district of Macleod for the Progressive Conservatives. He was re-elected in the 1982 Alberta general election winning a landslide and defeating five other candidates.

After his convincing re-election win Fjordbotten was appointed to his first position in the Executive Council of Alberta as Minister of Agriculture. He would serve that post for most of his second term in office. He would become Minister of Tourism after Don Getty became premier of the province. Fjordbotten would handily win his third term winning a three-way race in the 1986 Alberta general election. He held his cabinet post for less than a year after the election before being promoted to be the new Minister of Forestry, Lands and Wildlife. He retained that cabinet post after he was re-elected in the 1989 Alberta general election. When Ralph Klein became premier in 1992 Fjordbotten was not part of the new cabinet. He did not run again for re-election when the assembly was dissolved in 1993. He died in June 2017 at the age of 78.
