= Malcolm McKenzie =

Canadian politician (1863–1913)

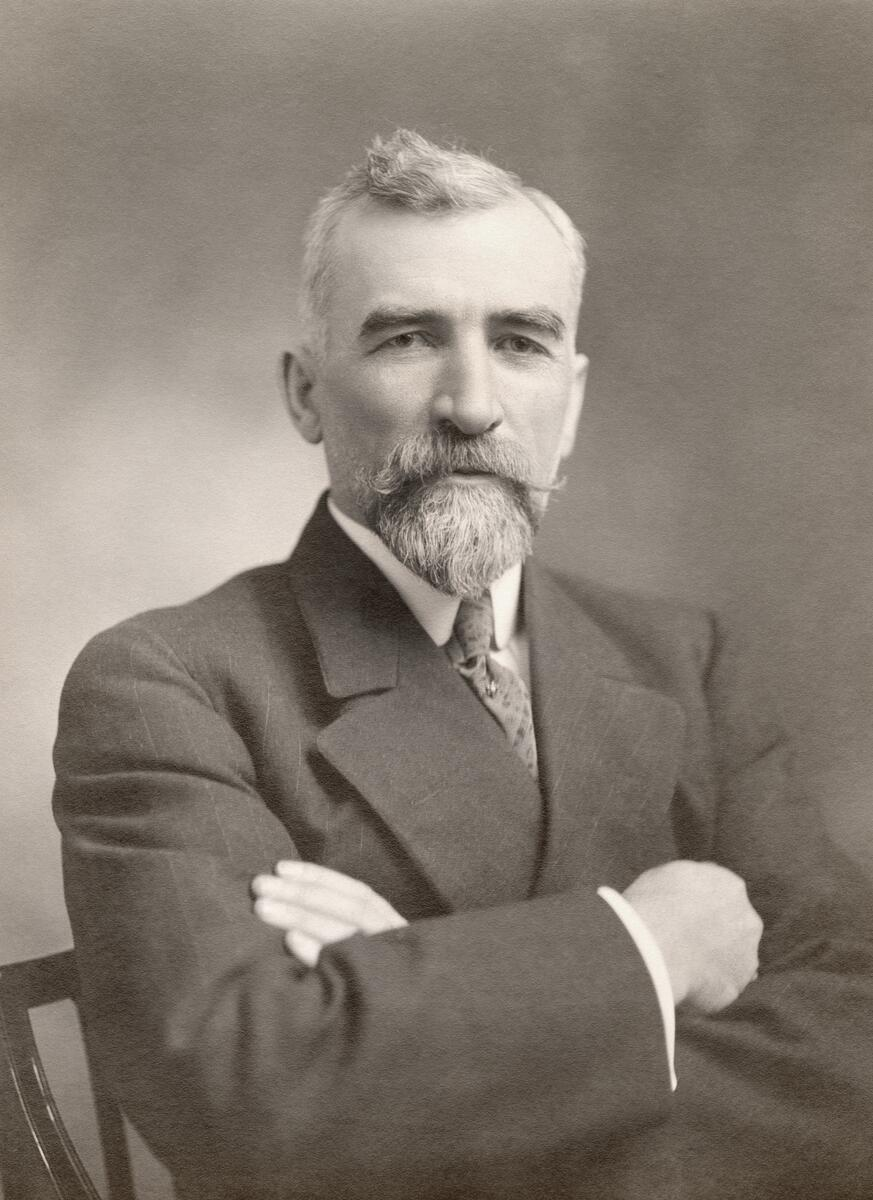

Alberta Provincial Treasurer
- In office May 4, 1912 – March 15, 1913
- Preceded by: Arthur Sifton
- Succeeded by: Arthur Sifton

Member of the Legislative Assembly of Alberta
- In office March 22, 1909 – March 15, 1913
- Preceded by: New district
- Succeeded by: William Moffat
- Constituency: Claresholm
- In office November 9, 1905 – March 22, 1909
- Preceded by: New district
- Succeeded by: Colin Genge
- Constituency: Macleod

Personal details
- Born: May 31, 1863 Kincardine, Ontario
- Died: March 15, 1913 (aged 49) Edmonton, Alberta
- Party: Liberal
- Children: One son, Malcolm
- Education: Queen's University
- Occupation: Lawyer

Malcolm McKenzie (May 31, 1863 – March 15, 1913) was a Canadian politician who served as a member of the Legislative Assembly of Alberta and, briefly, as Alberta Provincial Treasurer.

== Early life ==
Malcolm McKenzie was born in Kincardine, Canada West, in 1863. He attended Queen's University, from which he graduated with a gold medal in philosophy, and then studied for a year in Toronto, Ontario. He came west around 1888 and, after a brief stay in Calgary, North-West Territories (NWT), settled in Fort Macleod, NWT, where he joined the law firm Haultain, McKenzie and McNeill. That firm dissolved when its senior partner, Frederick W. A. G. Haultain, went to Regina to serve as the first Premier of the Northwest Territories. McKenzie established another law firm with John McDonald and another lawyer; that firm was called McDonald, Martin and McKenzie.

== Political career ==
McKenzie first sought office in the 1904 federal election, when he ran as the Liberal candidate in Alberta (Provisional District). He was narrowly defeated by John Herron of the rival Liberal-Conservative Party. When the province of Alberta was created out of the North-West Territories in 1905, McKenzie then ran in the 1905 Alberta election, the province's first, as the Liberal candidate in Macleod, where he handily defeated his two opponents. In the first legislature he, along with most members from the province's south, favoured Calgary over Edmonton as the Alberta's permanent capital; his side was out-voted 16 to 8. He also proposed the successful name for Granum, located in his district and hitherto known as Leavings Switch; the area around Granum was known as excellent grain land, and "granum" is Latin for grain.

In the 1909 election, McKenzie was re-elected in the new district of Claresholm, by a margin still larger than the one he had achieved in 1905. During the Alberta and Great Waterways Railway scandal, he remained loyal to the Liberal government of Alexander Cameron Rutherford; when that government fell, he transferred his allegiance to the new Liberal government of Arthur Sifton, though several other former Rutherford partisans (including Rutherford himself) opposed the new regime. His loyalty was rewarded in May 1912 when Sifton appointed him Provincial Treasurer. In keeping with the era's custom, McKenzie responded to the cabinet appointment by resigning his seat in the legislature to contest it in a by-election. Despite his previous wide margins, in 1912 he carried Claresholm by only 14 votes.

McKenzie's tenure as treasurer was not to last long: he caught a chill while attending the convention that nominated him as the Liberals' Claresholm candidate in the 1913 election, and by the time he returned to Edmonton on March 10, 1913, he was sufficiently ill to confine himself to bed. He had developed peritonitis, and died from it early in the morning of March 15, 1913. The Liberal Edmonton Bulletin, in mourning his passing, said that "no lawyer in the province had such a firm grasp in legal matters. No member of the house performed his legislative duties so admirably and so well. He has left his impression on more legislation than any other member." He was survived by a wife and one son.

== Electoral record ==
=== Provincial elections ===
1905 Alberta general election: Macleod
Party	Candidate	Votes	%	±%
Liberal	Malcolm McKenzie	584	58.11%	–
Conservative	David J. Crier	368	36.62%	–
Independent	Duncan J.D.K. Campbell	53	5.27%	–
Total		1,005	–	–
Rejected, spoiled and declined		N/A	–	–
Eligible electors / turnout		N/A	N/A	–
Liberal pickup new district.				
Source(s) Source: "Macleod Official Results 1905 Alberta general election". Alberta Heritage Community Foundation.

1909 Alberta general election: Claresholm
Party	Candidate	Votes	%	±%
Liberal	Malcolm McKenzie	696	61.87%	–
Conservative	J. F. Garrow	429	38.13%	–
Total		1,125	–	–
Rejected, spoiled and declined		N/A	–	–
Eligible electors / turnout		N/A	N/A	–
Liberal pickup new district.				
Source(s) Source: "Claresholm Official Results 1909 Alberta general election". Alberta Heritage Community Foundation.

Alberta provincial by-election, May 27, 1912: Claresholm Ministerial by-election upon Malcolm McKenzie's appointment as Provincial Treasurer
Party	Candidate	Votes	%	±%
Liberal	Malcolm McKenzie	651	50.54%	-11.33%
Conservative	D. S. MacMillan	637	49.45%	11.33%
Total		1,288	–	–
Rejected, spoiled and declined		N/A	–	–
Eligible electors / turnout		N/A	N/A	–
Liberal hold		Swing		-11.33
Source(s) "By-elections". elections.ab.ca. Elections Alberta.

=== Federal elections ===
1904 Canadian federal election: Alberta
Party	Candidate	Votes	%	±%
Liberal–Conservative	John Herron	1,755	51.14	+7.50
Liberal	Malcolm McKenzie	1,677	48.86	–7.50
Total valid votes		3,432	100.00	
Total rejected ballots		unknown		
Turnout		3,432	98.82	+22.29
Eligible voters		3,473		
Liberal–Conservative gain from Liberal		Swing		+7.50
Source: Library of Parliament
