= William Moffat (Alberta politician) =

Canadian politician (1847–1926)

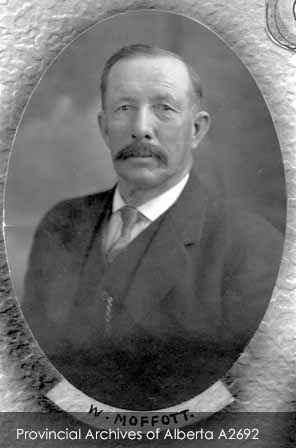

Member of the Legislative Assembly of Alberta
- In office 1909–1917
- Preceded by: Malcolm McKenzie
- Succeeded by: Louise McKinney
- Constituency: Claresholm

Personal details
- Born: January 10, 1847 Carleton Place, Ontario
- Died: September 5, 1926 (aged 79)
- Party: Alberta Liberal Party
- Spouse: Flora McLean
- Children: 7
- Occupation: Women's rights activist and politician

William Moffat (January 20, 1847 – September 5, 1926) was a Canadian politician from Alberta.

== Early life ==
William Moffat was born January 20, 1847, in Carleton Place, Ontario to Robert Moffatt and Mary Ann Saunders. He was educated at Carleton Place and married Flora McLean on February 5, 1873, and together had seven children.

== Political life ==
Moffat was the Town of Claresholm's first resident and Mayor. He was first elected to the Alberta Legislature in the 1913 general election to the Claresholm under the banner of the Alberta Liberal Party. He defeated Conservative candidate D.S. McMillan and Independent candidate G. Malshow. In the 1917 general election he was defeated by Louise McKinney, who thus became the first woman elected to a Legislature in the British Empire.

== Later life ==
Moffat died on September 5, 1926.
