= Gordon Beverly Walker =

Canadian politician

Gordon B. Walker
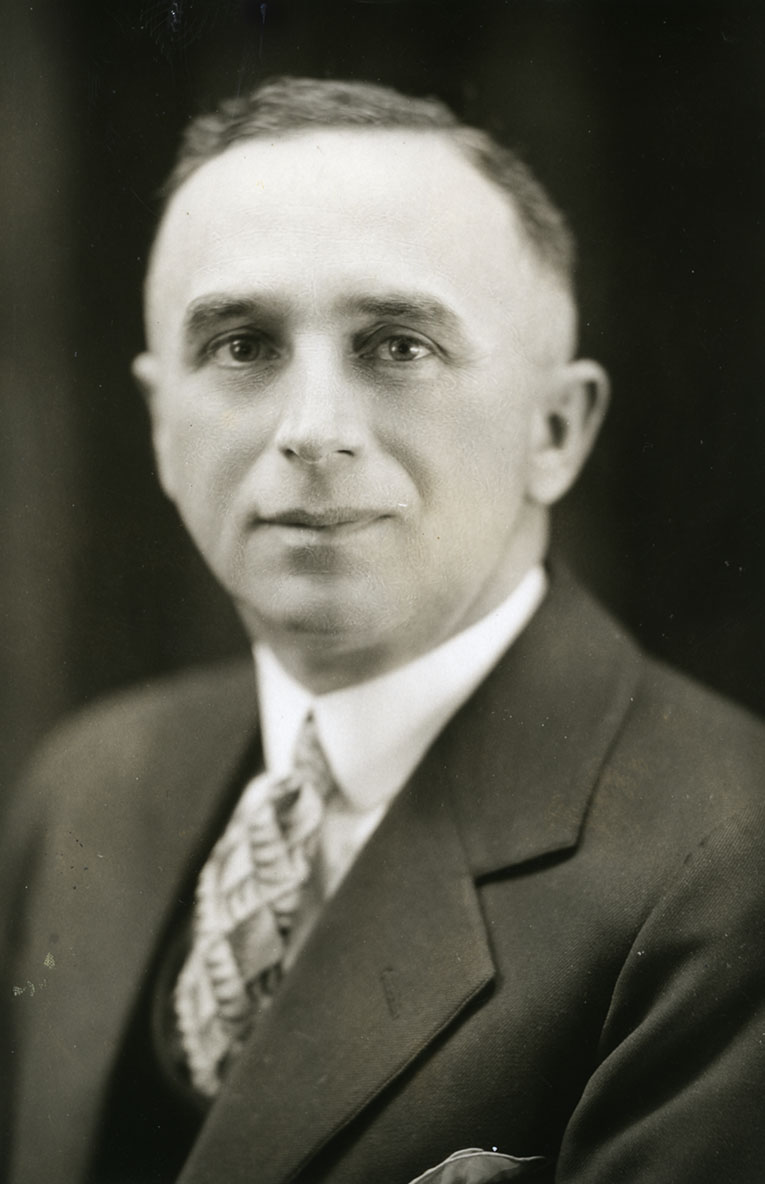
- Walker in 1930

Member of the Legislative Assembly of Alberta
- In office 1926–1935
- Preceded by: Thomas Milnes
- Succeeded by: Harry O. Haslam
- Constituency: Claresholm (1926–30); Nanton-Claresholm (1930–35)

Personal details
- Born: March 22, 1891 Camlachie, Ontario, Canada
- Died: July 5, 1954 (aged 63) Claresholm, Alberta, Canada
- Party: United Farmers of Alberta
- Occupation: farmer

Gordon Beverly Walker (March 22, 1891 – July 5, 1954) was a United Farmers of Alberta member of the Legislative Assembly for the years from 1926 to 1935. At the general election in 1926 in the riding of Claresholm he defeated incumbent Thomas Milnes, Independent. Again elected in 1930 representing the riding of Nanton-Claresholm. Defeated in 1935 by Harry Haslam, Social Credit.

Born at Camlachie in Lambton County, Ontario of Henry Walker and Rachel Matthews; educated at Pipestone, Manitoba; graduated 1919 with a degree in agriculture from the University of Manitoba (Manitoba Agricultural College). In 1920, appointed farm manager at the Claresholm School of Agriculture. Continued to farm, with his brother Ira Bertram Walker, as the Walker Brothers (W bar lazy B). Walker was active in community life and served for many years as delegate of the Alberta Wheat Pool (B2), secretary of the Alberta Telephone Company, a member of the United Church session in Claresholm, of the Claresholm Municipal Hospital Board and of the I.O.O.F. Lodge to name a few. Died at Claresholm: survived by his wife, Linnea (b. October 9, 1907; d. April 8, 1992), a nursing graduate of the Calgary General, formerly matron of the Claresholm Hospital; two sons Douglas and Harvey; brother Bert, and three sisters, Gertrude Ralston of Victoria; Ora Sheppard and Alma Walker, both of Calgary.
