= George Skelding =

Canadian politician (1864–1927)

Member of the Legislative Assembly of Alberta
- In office June 7, 1917 – July 18, 1921
- Preceded by: Robert Patterson
- Succeeded by: William Shield
- Constituency: Macleod

Personal details
- Born: May 18, 1864 Belmont, Canada West
- Died: July 18, 1927 (aged 63) Fort Macleod, Alberta
- Party: Liberal
- Spouse: Annie(Jane)Renwick
- Occupation: Police officer, ranch hand, businessman and politician

George Skelding (May 18, 1864 – July 18, 1927) was a provincial politician from Alberta, Canada. He served as a member of the Legislative Assembly of Alberta from 1917 to 1921 sitting with the Liberal caucus in government.

== Early life ==
George Skelding was born in Belmont, Canada West in 1864. He came west with the North-West Mounted Police in 1886 and helped establish the police barracks in Lethbridge. He moved to Fort Macleod in 1887 and started working as a ranch hand at the Strong Ranch and later the Cochrane Ranch.

After a brief career at ranching Skelding became a coal dealer within a couple years and continued with that business the rest of his life. He was also involved with the grocery business becoming one half of the partnership of Baker and Skelding Co. until it was sold off.

He married his wife Annie Renwick in September 1904 and had no children.

== Political career ==
Skelding ran for a seat to the Alberta Legislature as a candidate for the Alberta Liberals in the 1917 Alberta general election. He defeated Conservative incumbent Robert Patterson in a hotly contested race winning the Macleod district by just 50 votes to pick it up for his party.

Skelding was a poor orator and did not speak very often on the floor of the Legislature. He lobbied the Liberal government for road improvements in the Macleod district and did most of his work as an MLA in legislature committee's.

Skelding ran for a second term in the 1921 Alberta general election but was defeated by United Farmers candidate William Shield.

== Late life ==
After being defeated from public office. Skelding expanded his business to include a lumber yard along with a chopping mill and a farm services business for seed grain cleaning.

Skelding became very ill towards the end of his life. He required some surgeries and eventually became confined to his house as his health worsened and then was bed ridden for the last month before he died on July 18, 1927. He was buried the next day in the Macleod Union Cemetery at Fort Macleod. His funeral was widely attended by members of the former Liberal government and other prominent people from across Alberta.
