= John W. McDonald =

Canadian lawyer, judge, provincial politician

John W. McDonald KC
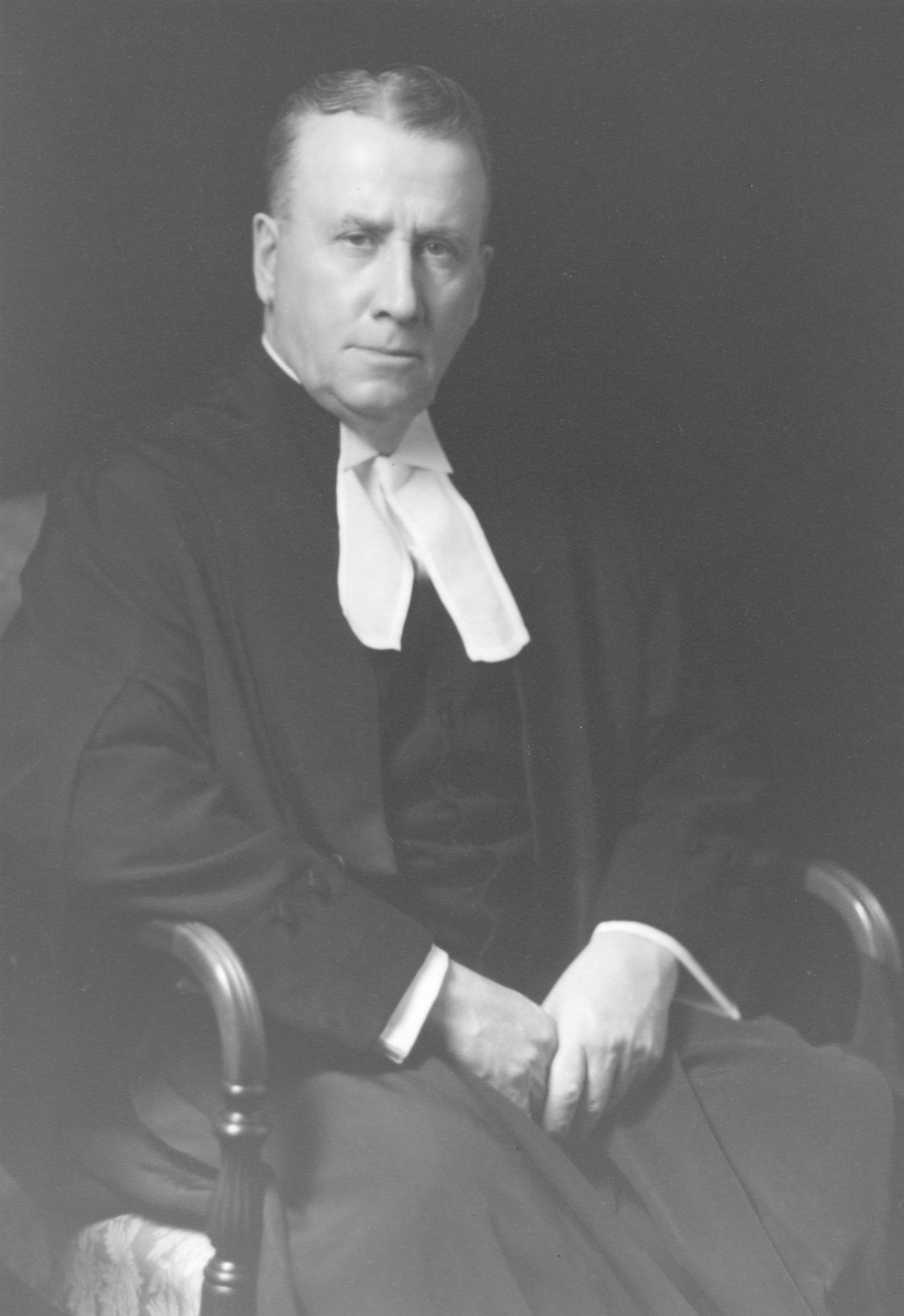
- McDonald in 1944

Leader of the Alberta Liberal Party
- In office March 28, 1930 – March 1, 1932 Serving with George Webster
- Preceded by: Joseph Shaw
- Succeeded by: George Webster

Mayor of Fort Macleod, Alberta
- In office 1923–1930
- In office 1934–1938

Personal details
- Born: May 21, 1878 Vaughan, Ontario
- Died: November 8, 1950 (aged 72) Calgary, Alberta
- Party: Liberal
- Spouse: Margaret McDonald
- Education: University of Toronto (LLB); Osgoode Hall Law School (BCL)
- Occupation: politician, lawyer, judge

John Walter McDonald KC (May 21, 1878 – November 8, 1950) was a Canadian lawyer, judge and provincial politician from Alberta. He served as Mayor of Fort Macleod, Alberta, Chief Judge of the District Court of Southern Alberta, and also led the Alberta Liberal Party for a brief period from 1930 to 1932.

== Early life ==
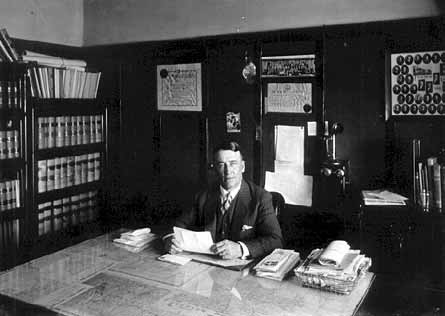
John Walter McDonald in his Macleod office in 1920

John W. McDonald was born in Vaughan, Ontario. He took his post secondary education at the University of Toronto graduated with a Bachelor of Laws and Bachelor of Civil Law in 1905 and became a lawyer. McDonald married his wife Margaret in 1907. McDonald practiced in Toronto with the firm of Denton, Dunn and Boultbee, until he moved west, passed the Alberta Bar in 1907 and established became legal partners with Malcolm McKenzie at the firm of McDonald, Martin and McKenzie. McDonald was appointed King's Counsel in 1919 and became Crown Prosecutor for the Judicial District of Macleod. As a Crown Prosecutor he received recognition for two infamous murder trials of R v. Basoff (1920) where Tom Bassoff was convicted of murdering Alberta Provincial Police Constable Fred W.E. Bailey and Royal Canadian Mounted Police Corporal Usher in a shootout in Bellevue, Alberta, and R. v. Zitto (1923).

== Political career ==
McDonald ran for Mayor of Fort Macleod in 1923, holding the position until 1930, and again from 1934 to 1938. While in Fort Macleod he also served as a member of the local school board, several community organizations, and was an honorary Chief of the Blood Tribe.

McDonald ran for a seat to the Alberta Legislature in the 1926 Alberta general election as a Liberal candidate in the electoral district of Macleod. He faced United Farmers incumbent MLA William Shield in a hotly contested race. The race went to a second vote count with Shield hanging on by just over 100 votes.

McDonald ran for leader of the Alberta Liberal Party after Joseph Shaw resigned. He was elected in a hotly contested race at a convention held on March 28, 1930. He won the leadership on the third ballot against Hugh John Montgomery and William Howson.

The 1930 Alberta general election was held three months later. McDonald led the Liberals to four seat gain over the last election despite losing almost 2% of their popular vote. In his constituency McDonald was badly defeated having run for the second time against Shield in a two-way race.

After the election McDonald remained leader of the party, the question of his leadership became a turbulent one as Liberals wondered who would represent them at the opening of the house. Rumors began swirling in the aftermath about a parliamentary coalition being formed with the Conservatives which both parties flatly denied. McDonald tried to find a seat, the nearest Liberal MLA Harvey Bossenberry representing Pincher Creek flatly denied he would resign to provide a by-election for McDonald.

The Alberta Liberals held their annual convention on November 29, 1930. The sixty delegates in attendance gave confidence to McDonald's party leadership on the condition that he must seek election at the first opportunity. The leadership question of the Assembly was fixed when the Liberal caucus chose George Webster as House Leader. McDonald continued on as Leader for another year before tendering his resignation on March 1, 1932.

== Later life ==
McDonald was appointed as a Judge for the District Court of Southern Alberta on May 24, 1940, and was subsequently appointed Chief Judge on March 18, 1944. He served in this role until his death in Calgary on November 8, 1950.
