= Thomas Milnes =

Canadian politician (1870–1954)

Thomas Charles Milnes

Member of the Legislative Assembly of Alberta
- In office July 18, 1921 – October 30, 1925
- Preceded by: Louise McKinney
- Succeeded by: Gordon Walker
- Constituency: Claresholm

Personal details
- Born: March 31, 1870 Columbus, Indiana
- Died: April 30, 1954 (aged 84) Calgary, Alberta
- Party: Independent Farmer
- Other political affiliations: Liberal
- Occupation: politician

Thomas Charles Milnes (March 11, 1870 – April 30, 1954) was a Canadian provincial politician from Alberta. He served as a member of the Legislative Assembly of Alberta from 1921 to 1925 sitting as an Independent and as Mayor of Claresholm from 1910 to 1911.

== Early life ==
Thomas Charles Milnes was born March 11, 1870, in Columbus, Indiana, to Thomas Milnes and Lousia Milnes. Milnes was educated in Columbus and married Emma McCleary on June 8, 1898, and together had four children. He moved to Canada later in 1905 to become a farmer and rancher.

Milnes constructed a two-storey Edwardian Commercial building in Claresholm known as Milnes Block in 1910. The building was designated a Provincial Historic Resource by the Government of Alberta on May 30, 2002.

== Political career ==
Milnes was elected Mayor of Claresholm, Alberta from 1910 to 1911.

Milnes ran for a seat to the Alberta Legislature as an Independent Farmer candidate in the 1921 Alberta general election. He defeated incumbent Louise McKinney in a hotly contested election to win the Claresholm electoral district.

Milnes resigned his seat in October 1925, to run as a candidate in the 1925 Canadian federal election. He ran as a federal Liberal candidate in the electoral district of Macleod. Milnes finished a distant third place in the three way race losing to George Coote and runner of John Herron.

== Later life ==
Milnes died at the Holy Cross Hospital in Calgary on April 30, 1954, at the age of 84.
