= Leighton Buckwell =

Canadian politician

Leighton Edward Buckwell

Member of the Legislative Assembly of Alberta
- In office 1967–1975
- Preceded by: James Hartley
- Succeeded by: Thomas Walker
- Constituency: Macleod

Personal details
- Born: November 28, 1918
- Died: January 2, 1997 (aged 78)
- Party: Social Credit

Leighton Edward Buckwell (November 28, 1918 – January 2, 1997) was a provincial level politician from Alberta, Canada. He served as a member of the Legislative Assembly of Alberta from 1967 to 1975 sitting with the Social Credit caucus in government and opposition.

== Political career ==
Buckwell ran for a seat to the Alberta Legislature in the 1967 Alberta general election. He won the electoral district of Macloed defeating three other candidates by a comfortable margin to hold the district for the Social Credit party.

He ran for a second term in office in the 1971 Alberta general election. Buckwell increased his popular vote to be returned to his district. He faced a tough fight in the three-way race from Progressive Conservative candidate Danny Le Grandeur who finished a close second.

The Social Credit party lost government and formed the official opposition after 1971. Buckwell ran for a third term in office in the 1975 Alberta general election facing a four cornered battle. He lost some of his popular vote and was defeated by Progressive Conservative candidate Thomas Walker to finish second.

Buckwell died on January 2, 1997.
