= William H. Shield =

Canadian politician (1878-1939)

William Hetherington Shield
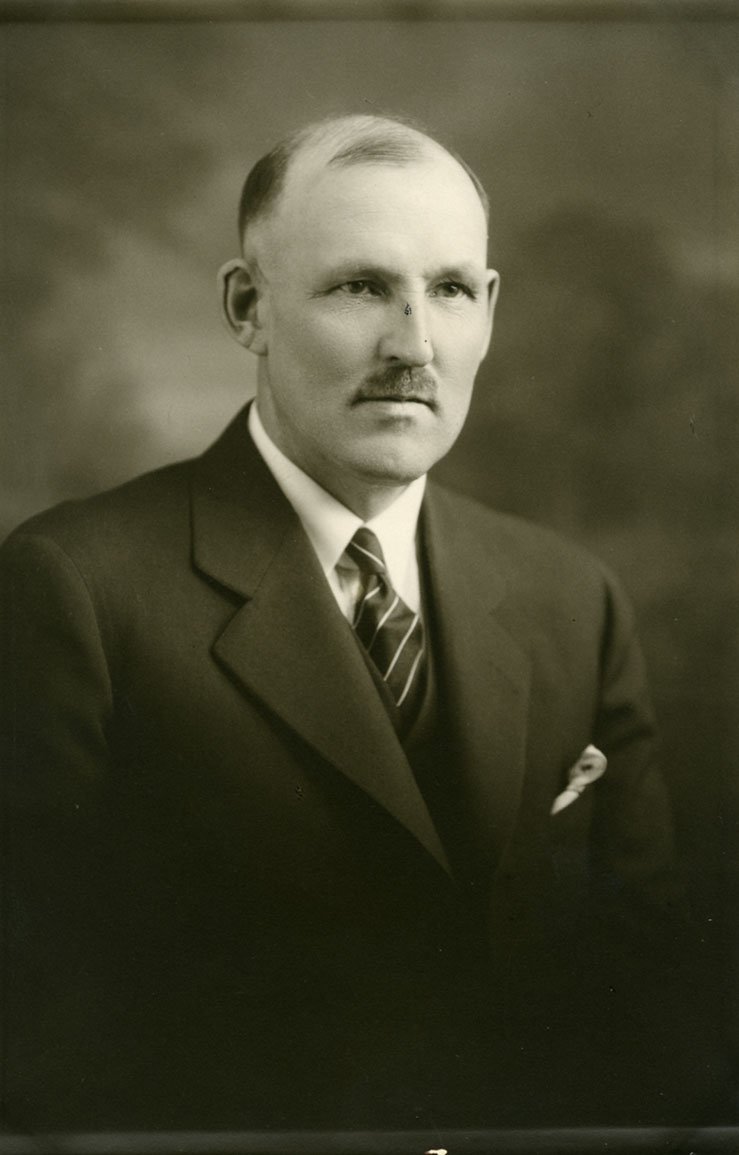

Member of the Legislative Assembly of Alberta
- In office July 18, 1921 – August 22, 1935
- Preceded by: George Skelding
- Succeeded by: James Hartley
- Constituency: Macleod

Personal details
- Born: July 12, 1878 Carr Shield, Northumberland, England
- Died: April 15, 1939 (aged 60) Fort Macleod, Alberta
- Party: United Farmers
- Occupation: politician

William Hetherington Shield (July 12, 1878 – April 15, 1939) was a Canadian provincial politician from Alberta. He served as a member of the Legislative Assembly of Alberta from 1921 to 1935 sitting with the United Farmers caucus in government.

== Political career ==
Shield ran for a seat to the Alberta Legislature in the 1921 Alberta general election. He stood as a United Farmers candidate in the electoral district of Macloed against incumbent George Skelding. The race was very close with Shield defeating Skelding by 107 votes.

Shield ran for a second term in the 1926 Alberta general election. He faced two other candidates in a very close contest. Shield hung on to win in the second vote count over Liberal candidate John McDonald.

The 1930 Alberta general election saw Shield run in a two way race against McDonald who had become Liberal leader. Shield managed to win the straight fight with a greatly improved popular vote more than tripled from the previous election sending McDonald to defeat.

Shield ran for a fourth term in the 1935 Alberta general election but was defeated finishing a distant second in the three way race to Social Credit candidate James Hartley.
