= James Hartley (Canadian politician) =

Canadian politician (1888-1970)

James "Jim" Hartley
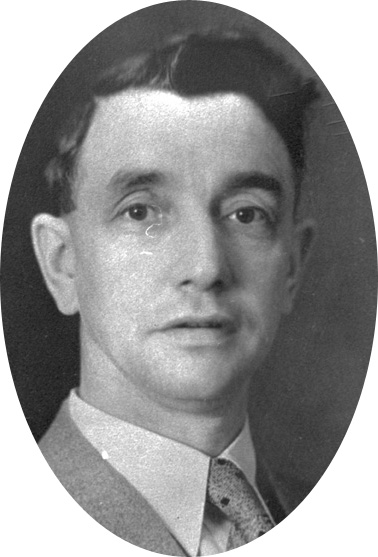

Member of the Legislative Assembly of Alberta
- In office August 22, 1935 – May 23, 1967
- Preceded by: William Shield
- Succeeded by: Leighton Buckwell
- Constituency: Macleod

Minister of Public Works
- In office August 2, 1955 – November 30, 1962
- Premier: Ernest Manning
- Preceded by: Alfred Hooke
- Succeeded by: Fred Colborne

Personal details
- Born: November 10, 1888 Bingley, West Yorkshire, England
- Died: October 11, 1970 (aged 81) Fort Macleod, Alberta
- Party: Social Credit
- Occupation: politician

James Hartley (November 10, 1888 – October 11, 1970) was a provincial politician from Alberta, Canada. He served as a member of the Legislative Assembly of Alberta from 1935 to 1967 sitting with the Social Credit caucus in government. During his time in office Hartley served as a cabinet minister in the government of Premier Ernest Manning from 1955 to 1962.

== Political career ==
Hartley ran for a seat to the Alberta Legislature in the 1935 Alberta general election. He ran as a Social Credit candidate in the electoral district of Macleod. Hartley won the three-way race with a landslide majority easily defeating United Farmers incumbent William Shield to pick up the seat for his party.

The 1940 Alberta general election would see Hartley nearly be defeated by Independent candidate G.B. Walker in a hotly contested two-way race. Hartley hung on to his seat by just 41 votes to return to office.

Hartley ran for his third term in office in the 1944 Alberta general election. He was returned to office as he held his vote from 1940. The three opposition candidates split the vote allowing for Hartley to win easily.

Hartley ran for his fourth term in office in the 1948 Alberta general election. He won a landslide majority easily holding his seat in the three-way race.

The 1952 Alberta general election would see Hartley return to office with his largest popular vote to date. He would defeat two other candidates by a landslide to win his fifth term in office.

Hartley ran for his sixth term in office in the 1955 Alberta general election. He ran in a two-way race against Liberal candidate Charles Bennett who provided the strongest challenge to Hartley's seat since 1940. Hartley held his district with a reduced popular vote to return to office.

Premier Ernest Manning promoted Hartley to the Executive Council of Alberta after the election. He became Minister of Public Works on August 2, 1955. Hartley ran in his first election as a cabinet minister in the 1959 Alberta general election. He would win the largest popular vote of his career defeating two other candidates to return to his seventh term in office.

Manning would shuffle his cabinet in 1962 dropping Hartley from his portfolio. He would run for re-election as a regular member less than a year later in the 1963 Alberta general election. Hartley won his eighth term in office easily defeating two other candidates.

Hartley would retire from office at dissolution of the assembly in 1967.
