= Barbara Paterson =

Canadian artist (born 1935)

Barbara A. Paterson
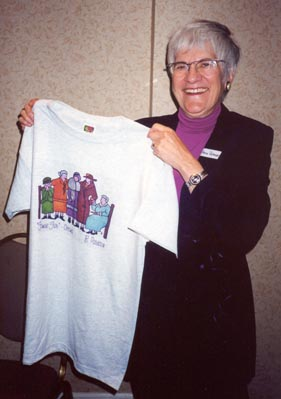
- Born: 1935 (age 89–90); Edmonton, Alberta
- Occupation: Sculptor

Barbara A. Paterson CM RCA is a Canadian artist, primarily known for her bronze figurative works, specializing in a variety of sculpture media including wax, stone, bronze and welded steel. She is based in Edmonton and is best known for her public sculptures of the "Famous Five."

== Biography ==
Paterson was born and raised in Edmonton and is the great-granddaughter of physician, William Morrison MacKay. Paterson attended the University of Alberta (U of A), where she met her future husband John Paterson. After receiving her Fine Arts diploma, Barbara worked as a stay-at-home mom. After raising three sons, she returned to U of A and earned her Bachelor of Fine Arts degree in 1988.

Paterson sculpted numerous public commissions, including Lois Hole "A Legacy of Love and Learning", and the "Famous Five" monuments in Calgary, Alberta's Olympic Square and on Parliament Hill in Ottawa, Ontario. A detail image from the "Famous Five" monuments was featured on a Canada Post stamp in October 1999, and was pictured on the Canadian $50.00 bill. An image of part of the statue can now be seen on the inner pages of the Canadian passport. The "Famous Five" sculpture, which is titled the Women are Persons! Monument, includes an empty chair which the artist added in order to make the sculpture more interactive.

In 2000, Paterson was honoured by U of A with a Distinguished Alumni Award, and in 2021, was named to the Order of Canada for her extraordinary contributions.

== Works ==
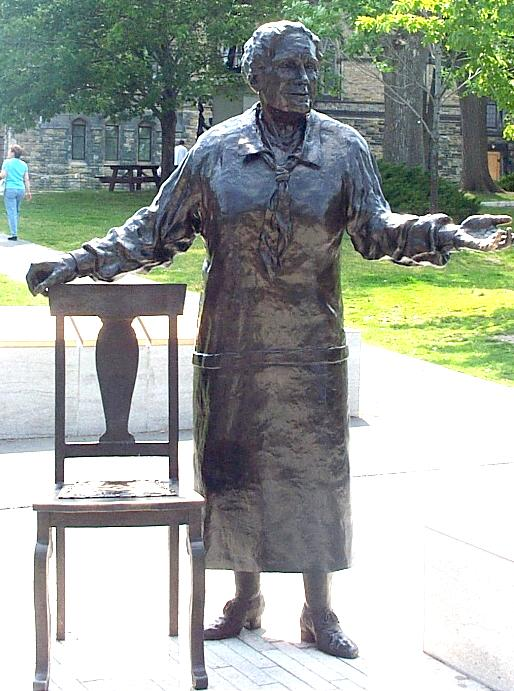
Barbara Paterson's statue of Emily Murphy in the Famous five, Parliament Hill, Ottawa, Ontario

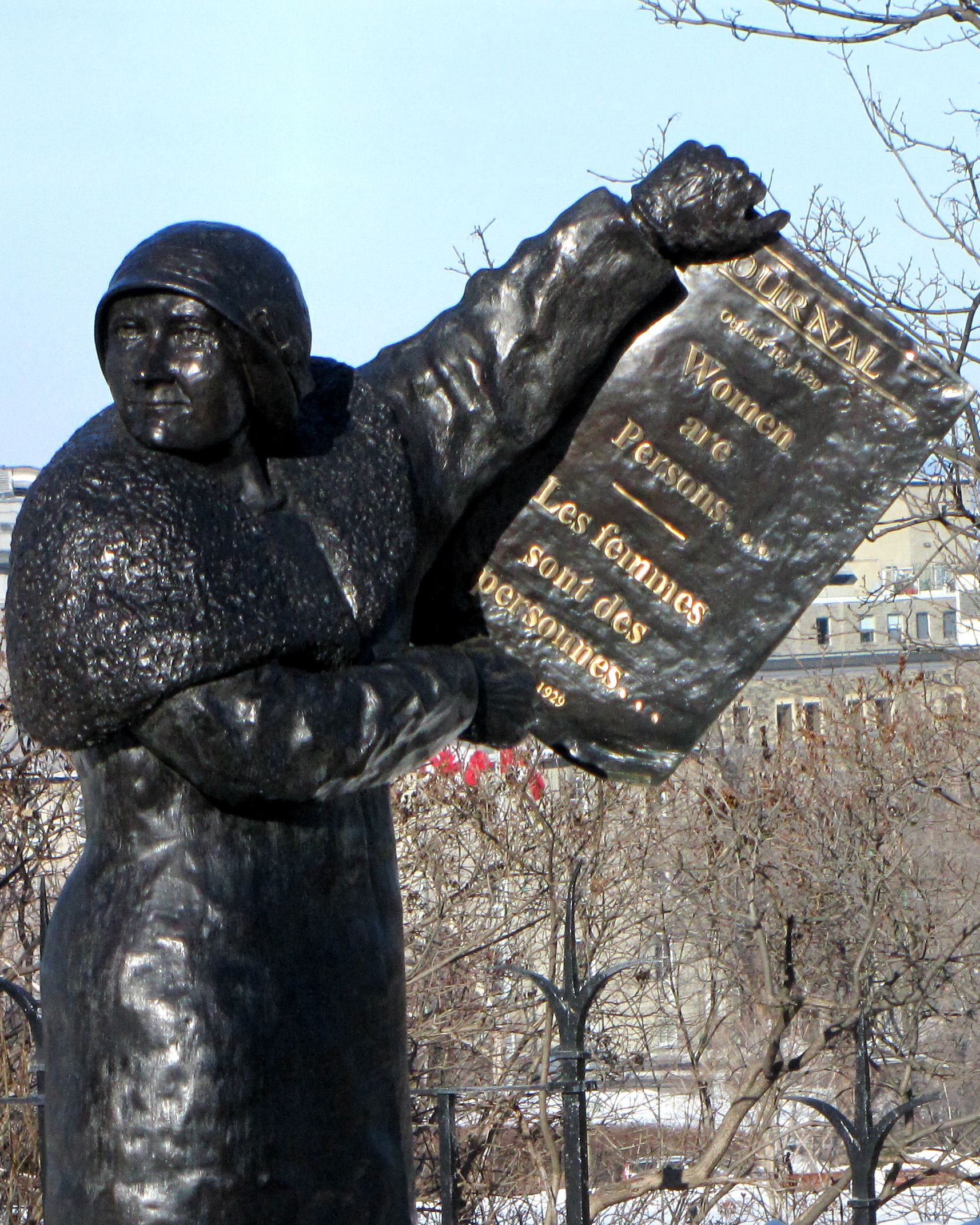
Barbara Paterson's statue of Nellie McClung in the Famous five, Parliament Hill, Ottawa, Ontario
