= Louise McKinney =

Canadian politician and activist (1868–1931)

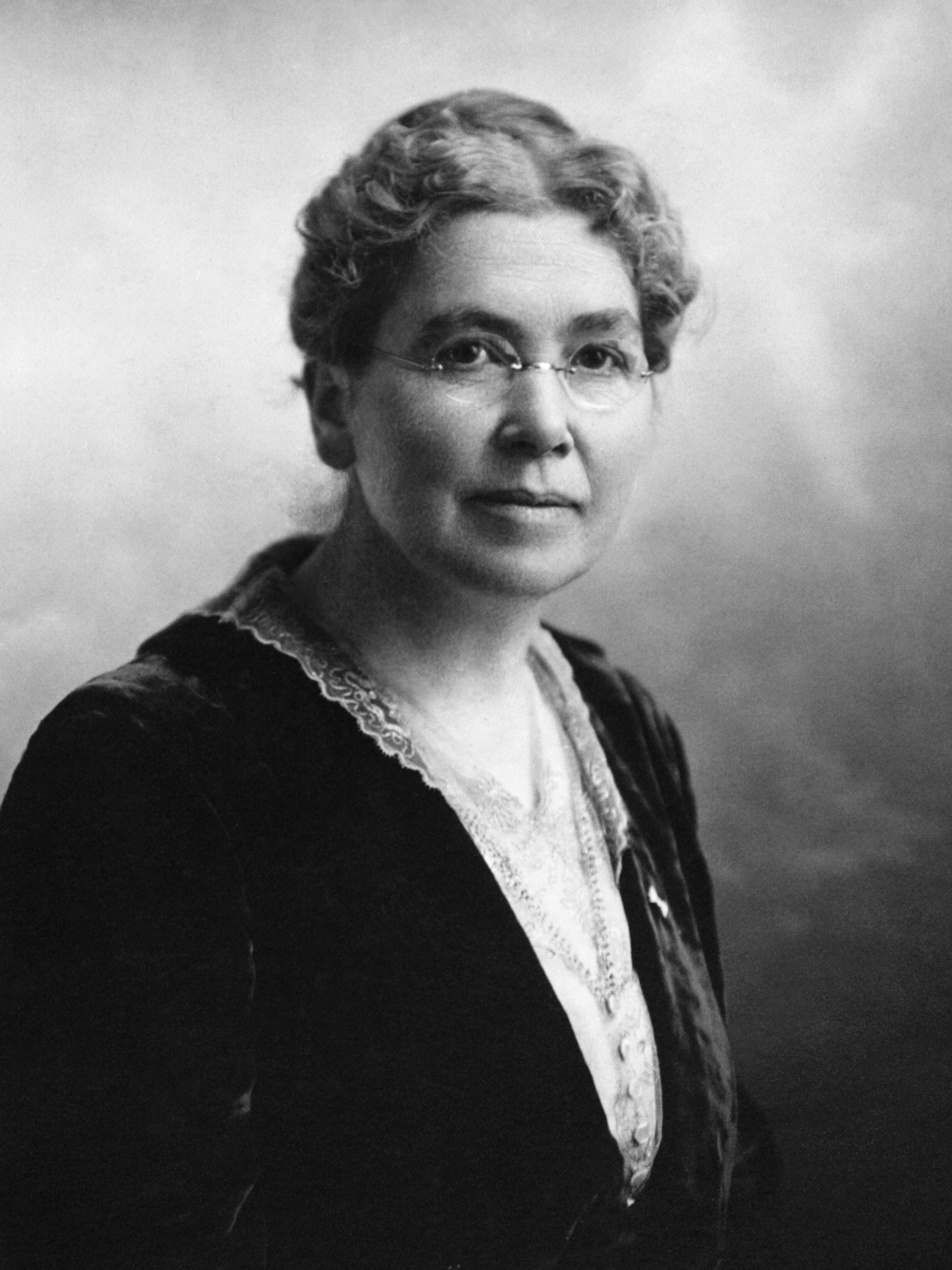
- McKinney in 1917

Member of the Legislative Assembly of Alberta
- In office 7 June 1917 – 18 July 1921
- Preceded by: William Moffat
- Succeeded by: Thomas Milnes
- Constituency: Claresholm

Personal details
- Born: Louise Crummy; 22 September 1868 Frankville, Ontario, Canada
- Died: 10 July 1931 (aged 62) Claresholm, Alberta, Canada
- Party: Non-Partisan League
- Other political affiliations: United Farmers
- Spouse: James McKinney (m. 1896)
- Children: 1
- Occupation: Politician; teacher; women's rights activist

Louise McKinney (née Crummy; 22 September 1868 – 10 July 1931) was a Canadian politician, temperance advocate, and women's rights activist. She was the first woman elected into the Legislative Assembly of Alberta and the first woman to serve in a legislature in the British Empire. She served in the Alberta legislature from 1917 to 1921 as a member of the Non-Partisan League. Later, she was one of the Famous Five who successfully campaigned for the right of Canadian women to be appointed to the Senate. A former schoolteacher and temperance organizer, she came to Alberta in 1903 as a homesteader.

McKinney was heavily involved in the Methodist Church and the Woman's Christian Temperance Union (Dominion WCTU). She served as president of the Alberta branch for 22 years, from 1908 to 1930. In 1930, she was elected president of the Dominion WCTU and organized the 1931 World Convention in Toronto. McKinney supported stricter immigration laws and the creation of institutions for "feeble-minded" people. In 2009, the Senate of Canada voted to make McKinney and other members of the Famous Five Canada's first honorary Senators.

== Early life ==
McKinney was born Louise Crummy on 22 September 1868 in Frankville, Ontario, the sixth of ten children of Richard Crummy and Esther Empey. Her father had emigrated from Ireland to settle in Upper Canada in 1842, later bringing his wife in 1857. McKinney graduated from Athens High School intending to become a physician but faced difficulty entering medical school due to her gender. Instead, she attended Ottawa Normal School to become a teacher. She taught for four years in Ontario before moving to North Dakota, where she taught for three more years.

== Involvement in the Woman's Christian Temperance Union ==
While teaching in North Dakota, McKinney became interested in the Woman's Christian Temperance Union. In 1894 she became one of the union's local organizers, travelling around the state to preach about the dangers of alcohol. While working in this capacity, she met James McKinney, whom she married in March 1896. They had one son, Williard, named after Frances Williard, the founder of the WCTU. She was elected as the North Dakota WCTU's District President in 1898 and represented her area at the National Convention the following year. The McKinneys continued to farm in North Dakota until 1903, when they moved to the Northwest Territories (present-day Alberta) and settled near Claresholm.

Within a few weeks of arriving in Alberta, McKinney set out to establish a local branch of the WCTU. The following year, she met with women from across the North-West Territories to discuss forming a larger union. The North-West Territories' WCTU was established. It was later renamed the Alberta and Saskatchewan WCTU when those provinces were formed in 1905. By 1912, the organization had so many members that it split into a separate group for each province. McKinney served as president of the Alberta WCTU for 22 years, from 1908 to 1930. For the same period, she served as vice-president of the Dominion WCTU. In 1930, she was voted president of the Dominion WCTU and organized the 1931 World Convention in Toronto, where she was elected vice-president of the World WCTU.

== Political career ==
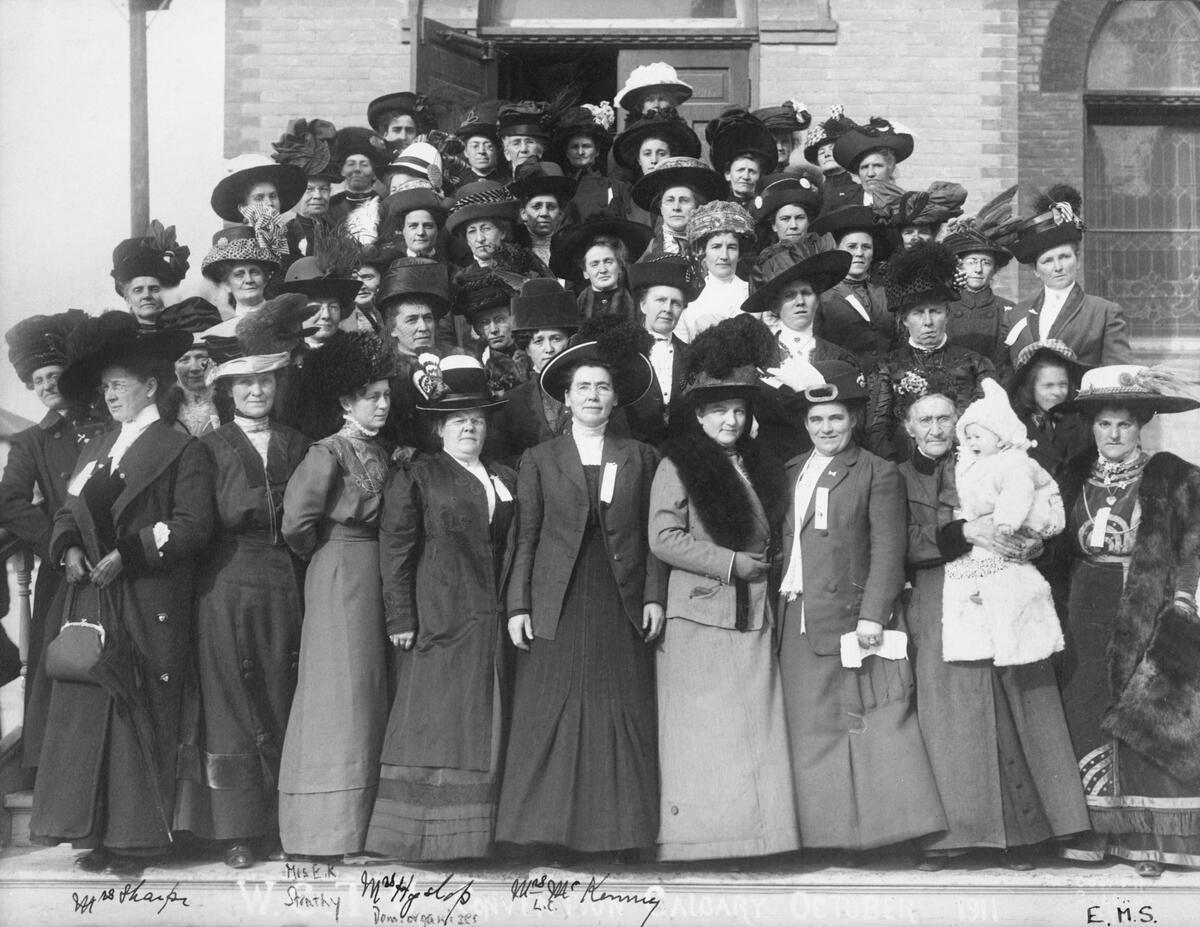
WCTU convention in Calgary, Alberta, in October 1911. McKinney is center in the front row.

McKinney ran for a seat in the Alberta Legislature for the electoral district of Claresholm in the 1917 general election, the first election in which women were allowed to vote. She defeated Liberal incumbent William Moffat as a candidate for the Non-Partisan League. In winning the election, she became the first woman elected to a legislature in the British Empire. (Note: One other woman, Roberta MacAdams, was also elected in the 1917 general election, but McKinney holds the distinction of being first as she was sworn in before MacAdams.) Much of her term in office was focused on working towards more effective prohibition, and she gained a reputation as a capable debater. Together with Henrietta Muir Edwards, she drafted and introduced a motion which ensured widows would receive a portion of their husbands' estate. After passing, it became known as the Dower Act.

Several of her fellow Famous Five members, including Parlby, Murphy, and McClung, were supporters of the eugenics movement in Alberta. It is not known if McKinney supported mandatory sterilization of "mental defectives." She advocated the creation of institutions to care for feeble-minded people and to prevent their procreation. McKinney promoted stricter immigration laws.

She ran for a second term in the 1921 Alberta general election as a United Farmers candidate. She was defeated by independent candidate Thomas Milnes by a margin of 46 votes. She never ran for political office again.

She remained active in the social and political sphere, especially with the WCTU. She was one of four women, and the only woman from Western Canada, who signed the Basis of Union for the United Church of Canada in 1925.

== Persons Case ==
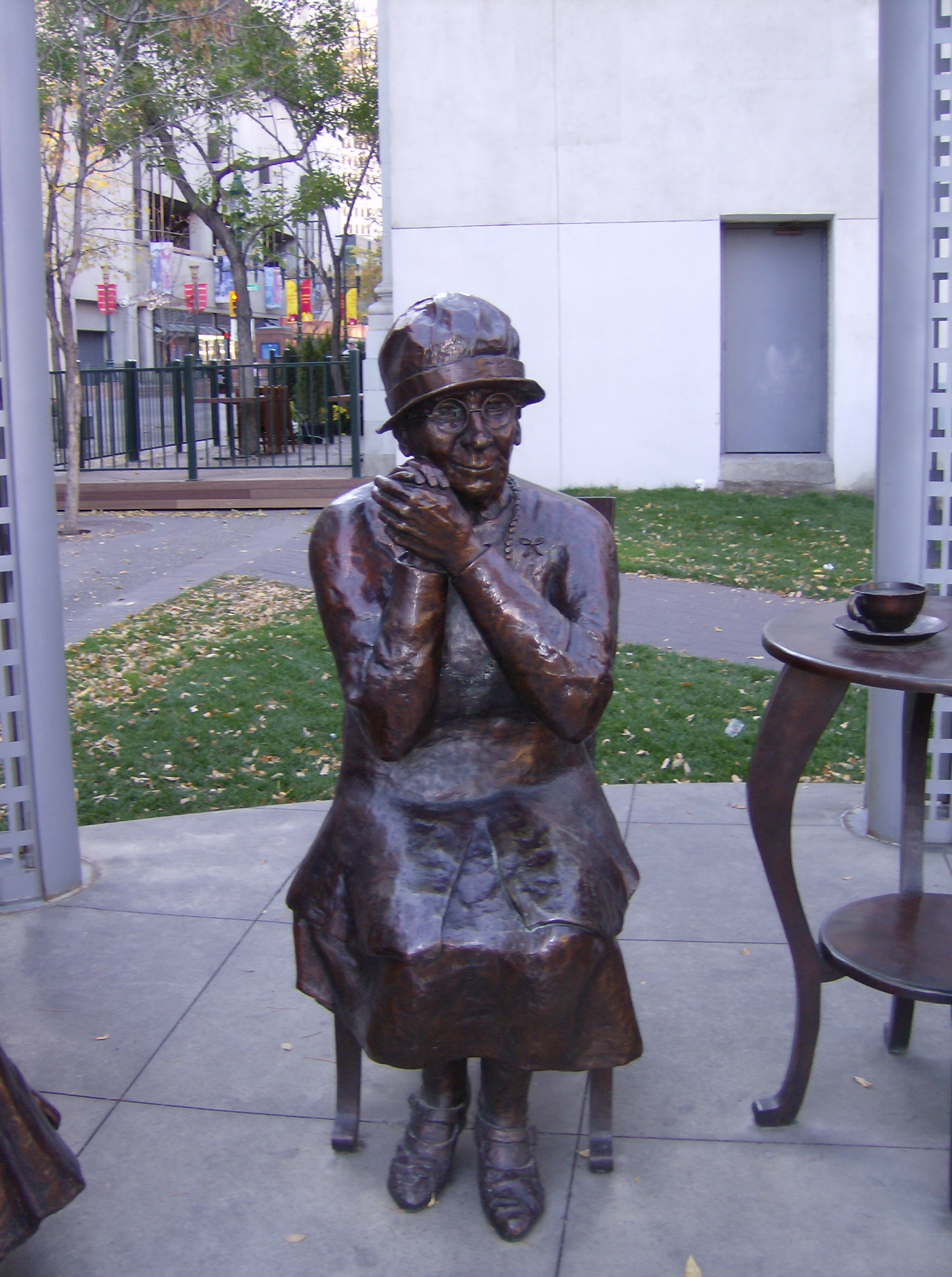
Statue of McKinney in Calgary, Alberta

McKinney was one of the Famous Five, along with Irene Parlby, Henrietta Muir Edwards, Emily Murphy and Nellie McClung, a group of five women who fought for the right to be considered "persons" and be eligible to serve in the Senate of Canada. The case is officially titled Edwards v Canada (AG) but is popularly known as the Persons Case. In 1927, the case was taken to the Supreme Court of Canada, which ruled that women were not eligible to serve in the Senate. In 1929, the Five appealed the ruling at the Judicial Committee of the Privy Council, Canada's highest court at the time. The Judicial Committee overturned the Supreme Court's decision, and the first woman, Cairine Wilson, was appointed to the Senate the following year.

== Death ==
McKinney fell ill during the WCTU World Convention in June 1931, and her sickness became worse after her return to Claresholm. She died after returning home the following month, less than two years after her victory in the Persons Case. Her death came as a shock to the WCTU, and tributes came from across the country and the world.

== Honours ==
=== National recognition ===
In 1939, the government of Canada recognized McKinney as a Person of National Historic Significance. A plaque commemorating this is on display at the post office in Claresholm. In 1997, the Persons Case was recognized as a National Historic Event.

In October 2009, the Senate voted to name McKinney and the rest of the Famous Five Canada's first "honorary senators".

=== Monuments and commemorations ===
In 2000, two identical monuments were created in Calgary, Alberta, and near the Senate of Canada Building, in Ottawa, Ontario. The monuments, called Women are Persons!, depict the members of the Famous Five reading the news about their victory in the Persons Case. The monuments were later featured on the $50 banknote of the Canadian Journey series.

== Sources ==
- Chambers, Ernest (1921). The Canadian parliamentary guide. Ottawa: The Mortimer Co. Limited. ISSN 0315-6168.
- Forster, Merna (2004), 100 Canadian Heroines: Famous and Forgotten Faces, Dundurn Press, ISBN 9781550025149
- MacEwan, Grant (1975), And mighty women too: stories of notable western Canadian women, Western Producer Prairie Books, ISBN 9780919306653
- Sharpe, Robert (2013), The Persons Case and the Living Tree Theory of Constitutional Interpretation
- Sharpe, Robert; McMahon, Patricia (2007). The Persons Case: The Origins and Legacy of the Fight for Legal Personhood. University of Toronto Press. ISBN 978-1-442-68498-0.
- White, Anne (2000), "Louise Crummy McKinney (1868–1931): A Window into Western Canadian Christianity", in Guenther, Bruce (ed.), Historical Papers 2000: Canadian Society of Church History, Canadian Society of Church History
