= Colin Genge =

Canadian politician (1859–1910)

Colin Melville Genge
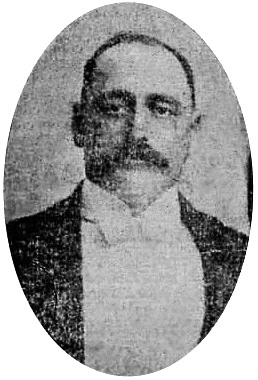

Member of the Legislative Assembly of Alberta
- In office 1909–1910
- Preceded by: Malcolm McKenzie
- Succeeded by: Robert Patterson
- Constituency: Macleod

Personal details
- Born: October 2, 1859 Kingston, Canada West
- Died: March 25, 1910 (aged 50) Edmonton, Alberta, Canada
- Party: Alberta Liberal Party
- Spouse: Anne May Ryan

Colin Melville Genge (October 2, 1859 – March 25, 1910) was a politician, contractor and business man from Alberta, Canada.

== Early life ==
Genge was born in Kingston, Canada West in the year 1859. He moved to Fort Macleod, North-West Territories in 1881 and married his wife Anne May Ryan in 1884. Upon moving to Fort Macleod, Genge became involved in numerous local business ventures. He operated a hardware store, owned a sandstone quarry, and ran the Fort Macleod Telephone Company.

Along with his retail and telecom ventures Genge also worked as a contractor. He designed and built the Queens Hotel in 1903 using sandstone from his own quarry.

Genge became interested in politics and started his career on the municipal level serving 2 terms as Mayor of Fort Macleod beginning in 1904.

== Political career and death ==
The province of Alberta was created out of the North-West Territories in 1905. Genge was elected to the Legislative Assembly of Alberta in the 1909 Alberta general election. He defeated Conservative Party candidate E.P. McNeill in a hotly contested election. Genge died less than a full year in his first term in office in 1910 vacating his seat in the legislature.

Legislative Assembly of Alberta
Preceded by Malcolm McKenzie	MLA Macleod; 1909–1910	Succeeded by Robert Patterson
