= Robert Patterson (Alberta politician) =

Canadian politician (1855–1938)

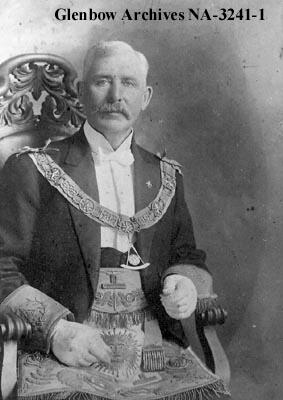

Member of the Legislative Assembly of Alberta
- In office October 3, 1910 – June 6, 1917
- Preceded by: Colin Genge
- Succeeded by: George Skelding
- Constituency: Macleod

Personal details
- Born: April 11, 1855 County Tipperary, Ireland
- Died: February 28, 1938 (aged 82) Winnipeg, Manitoba
- Party: Conservative
- Spouse: Sarah Lucinda Sayers (m. 1884)
- Children: six
- Occupation: Rancher; politician

Robert Patterson (April 11, 1855 – February 28, 1938) was a Canadian provincial politician from Alberta.

== Early life ==
Robert Patterson was born in County Tipperary, Ireland on April 11, 1855 to George and Mary Patterson. Patterson immigrated to Canada at the age of 21 and joined the North-West Mounted Police in 1876 and dispatched to Fort Macleod. Patterson began ranching in 1880 in Slide, Ontario and bought out his partner in 1884. Patterson served on Fort Macleod town council and a member of the school board for a number of years.

== Political life ==
Patterson was first elected to the Legislative Assembly of Alberta in a by-election on October 3, 1910. He ran as a Farmers Choice candidate and defeated Liberal candidate Edward Maunsell. He was sworn in and took his seat in the legislature on November 10, 1910, and chose to sit with the Conservative party. He was introduced to the Assembly by Edward Michener, the leader of the Conservatives, as was the custom for a party leader when a new member joined a caucus.

In the 1913 Alberta general election Patterson defeated Premier Arthur Lewis Sifton by a narrow margin. Sifton had also run in Vermilion and managed to retain his seat there.

In the 1917 Alberta general election he was defeated by George Skelding of the Liberal party by 50 votes.

Legislative Assembly of Alberta
| Preceded by Colin Genge | MLA Macleod; 1910–1917 | Succeeded by George Skelding |
