= Thomas J. Walker =

Canadian politician

Thomas James John Walker

Member of the Legislative Assembly of Alberta
- In office 1975–1979
- Preceded by: Leighton Buckwell
- Succeeded by: LeRoy Fjordbotten
- Constituency: Macleod

Personal details
- Born: October 30, 1927
- Died: June 8, 1998 (aged 70)
- Party: Progressive Conservative

Thomas James John Walker (October 30, 1927 – June 6, 1998) was a Canadian provincial level politician from Alberta. He served as a member of the Legislative Assembly of Alberta from 1975 to 1979 sitting with the governing Progressive Conservative caucus.

== Political career ==
Walker ran for a seat to the Alberta Legislature in the 1975 Alberta general election. He defeated incumbent Leighton Buckwell in a closely contested race to pick up the Macleod electoral district for the governing Progressive Conservative party. He retired from provincial politics at dissolution of the assembly in 1979.
