= Provincial Treasurer =

Canadian political post

In Canadian politics the Provincial Treasurer is a senior portfolio in the Executive Council (or cabinet) of provincial governments. The position is the provincial equivalent of the Minister of Finance and is responsible for setting the provincial budget. In most provinces the title of the position has changed to Minister of Finance in recent years.

== See also ==
- Treasurer
