= Macleod (provincial electoral district) =

Defunct provincial electoral district in Alberta, Canada

Coordinates: 50.3°N 113.6°W

Alberta electoral district

Defunct provincial electoral district
- Legislature: Legislative Assembly of Alberta
- District created: 1905
- District abolished: 1993
- First contested: 1905
- Last contested: 1989

Macleod was a provincial electoral district in Alberta, Canada, mandated to return a single member to the Legislative Assembly of Alberta from 1905 to 1993.

== History ==
The Macleod electoral district was one of the original 25 electoral districts contested in the 1905 Alberta general election after Alberta became a province in September 1905. The district was carried over from the territorial Macleod electoral district that had returned a single member to the Legislative Assembly of the North-West Territories from 1885 to 1905. In 1905 Frederick W. A. G. Haultain, the former Premier of the North-West Territories until 1905 and the Macleod member in the North-West Territories Assembly, chose to contest the South Qu'Appelle electoral district for a seat in the Legislative Assembly of Saskatchewan. Malcolm McKenzie, a lawyer who had lived in Fort Macleod and previously worked with Haultain, was elected the first representative of the Macleod provincial district.

From 1924 to 1956, the district used instant-runoff voting to elect its MLA.

The Macleod electoral district was abolished in the 1993 electoral district re-distribution when it was merged with Pincher Creek-Crowsnest to form the Pincher Creek-Macleod electoral district.

=== Members of the Legislative Assembly (MLAs) ===
Members of the Legislative Assembly for Macleod
Assembly	Years	Member	Party
1st	1905–1909	Malcolm McKenzie	Liberal
2nd	1909–1910	Colin Genge	Liberal
2nd	1910–1913	Robert Patterson	Conservative
3rd	1913–1917	Robert Patterson	Conservative
4th	1917–1921	George Skelding	Liberal
5th	1921–1926	William H. Shield	United Farmers
6th	1926–1930	William H. Shield	United Farmers
7th	1930–1935	William H. Shield	United Farmers
8th	1935–1940	James Hartley	Social Credit
9th	1940–1944	James Hartley	Social Credit
10th	1944–1948	James Hartley	Social Credit
11th	1948–1952	James Hartley	Social Credit
12th	1952–1955	James Hartley	Social Credit
13th	1955–1959	James Hartley	Social Credit
14th	1959–1963	James Hartley	Social Credit
15th	1963–1967	James Hartley	Social Credit
16th	1967–1971	Leighton E. Buckwell	Social Credit
17th	1971–1975	Leighton E. Buckwell	Social Credit
18th	1975–1979	Thomas J. Walker	Progressive Conservative
19th	1979–1982	LeRoy Fjordbotten	Progressive Conservative
20th	1982–1986	LeRoy Fjordbotten	Progressive Conservative
21st	1986–1989	LeRoy Fjordbotten	Progressive Conservative
22nd	1989–1993	LeRoy Fjordbotten	Progressive Conservative
See Pincher Creek-Macleod electoral district from 1993-1997

== Election results ==
=== 1905 ===
The returning officer for the 1905 election was James Wilson.

1905 Alberta general election
Party	Candidate	Votes	%	±%
Liberal	Malcolm McKenzie	584	58.11%	–
Conservative	David J. Crier	368	36.62%	–
Independent	Duncan J.D.K. Campbell	53	5.27%	–
Total		1,005	–	–
Rejected, spoiled and declined		N/A	–	–
Eligible electors / turnout		N/A	N/A	–
Liberal pickup new district.				
Source(s) Source: "Macleod Official Results 1905 Alberta general election". Alberta Heritage Community Foundation.

=== 1909 ===
1909 Alberta general election
Party	Candidate	Votes	%	±%
Liberal	Colin Genge	342	51.12%	-6.99%
Conservative	E. P. McNeill	327	48.88%	12.26%
Total		669	–	–
Rejected, spoiled and declined		N/A	–	–
Eligible electors / turnout		N/A	N/A	–
Liberal hold		Swing		-9.63%
Source(s) Source: "Macleod Official Results 1909 Alberta general election". Alberta Heritage Community Foundation.

=== 1910 by-election ===
Alberta provincial by-election, October 3, 1910 Upon Colin Genge's death on March 25, 1910
Party	Candidate	Votes	%	±%
Conservative	Robert Patterson	446	55.47%	6.59%
Liberal	Edward Maunsell	358	44.53%	-6.59%
Total		804	–	–
Rejected, spoiled and declined		N/A	–	–
Eligible electors / turnout		N/A	N/A	–
Conservative gain from Liberal		Swing		3.30%
Source(s) "By-elections". Elections Alberta.

=== 1913 ===
1913 Alberta general election
Party	Candidate	Votes	%	±%
Conservative	Robert Patterson	579	50.83%	-4.64%
Liberal	Arthur Sifton	560	49.17%	4.64%
Total		1,139	–	–
Rejected, spoiled and declined		N/A	–	–
Eligible electors / turnout		N/A	N/A	–
Conservative hold		Swing		-2.32%
Source(s) Source: "Macleod Official Results 1913 Alberta general election". Alberta Heritage Community Foundation.

=== 1917 ===
1917 Alberta general election
Party	Candidate	Votes	%	±%
Liberal	George Skelding	728	51.78%	2.61%
Conservative	Robert Patterson	678	48.22%	-2.61%
Total		1,406	–	–
Rejected, spoiled and declined		N/A	–	–
Eligible electors / turnout		1,813	77.55%	–
Liberal gain from Conservative		Swing		0.94%
Source(s) Source: "Macleod Official Results 1917 Alberta general election". Alberta Heritage Community Foundation.

=== 1921 ===
1921 Alberta general election
Party	Candidate	Votes	%	±%
United Farmers	William H. Shield	727	53.97%	–
Liberal	George Skelding	620	46.03%	-5.75%
Total		1,347	–	–
Rejected, spoiled and declined		N/A	–	–
Eligible electors / turnout		1,785	75.46%	–
United Farmers gain from Liberal		Swing		2.19%
Source(s) Source: "Macleod Official Results 1921 Alberta general election". Alberta Heritage Community Foundation.

=== 1926 ===
1926 Alberta general election
Party	Candidate	Votes 1st count	%	Votes final count	±%
United Farmers	William H. Shield	656	48.66%	709	-5.31%
Liberal	John W. McDonald	567	42.06%	606	-3.97%
Conservative	Robert Patterson	125	9.27%	–	–
Total		1,348	–	–	–
Rejected, spoiled and declined		56	–	–	–
Eligible electors / turnout		1,769	79.37%	3.90%	–
United Farmers hold		Swing		-0.67%	
Source(s) Source: "Macleod Official Results 1926 Alberta general election". Alberta Heritage Community Foundation. As no candidate received a plurality of votes, the bottom candidate was eliminated and their 2nd place votes were applied to both other candidates until one received a plurality.

=== 1930 ===
1930 Alberta general election
Party	Candidate	Votes	%	±%
United Farmers	William H. Shield	1,539	65.80%	17.13%
Liberal	John W. McDonald	800	34.20%	-7.86%
Total		2,339	–	–
Rejected, spoiled and declined		85	–	–
Eligible electors / turnout		3,179	76.25%	-3.12%
United Farmers hold		Swing		12.50%
Source(s) Source: "Macleod Official Results 1930 Alberta general election". Alberta Heritage Community Foundation.

=== 1935 ===
1935 Alberta general election
Party	Candidate	Votes	%	±%
Social Credit	James Hartley	1,680	61.83%	–
United Farmers	William H. Shield	650	23.92%	-41.87%
Liberal	C. T. Schiebout	387	14.24%	-19.96%
Total		2,717	–	–
Rejected, spoiled and declined		89	–	–
Eligible electors / turnout		3,260	86.07%	9.82%
Social Credit gain from United Farmers		Swing		3.16%
Source(s) Source: "Macleod Official Results 1935 Alberta general election". Alberta Heritage Community Foundation.

=== 1940 ===
1940 Alberta general election
Party	Candidate	Votes	%	±%
Social Credit	James Hartley	2,487	50.42%	-11.42%
Independent	G. B. Walker	2,446	49.58%	–
Total		4,933	–	–
Rejected, spoiled and declined		162	–	–
Eligible electors / turnout		6,190	82.31%	-3.76%
Social Credit hold		Swing		-18.54%
Source(s) Source: "Macleod Official Results 1940 Alberta general election". Alberta Heritage Community Foundation.

=== 1944 ===
1944 Alberta general election
Party	Candidate	Votes	%	±%
Social Credit	James Hartley	2,440	53.59%	3.18%
Independent	Earnest Bennion	989	21.72%	-27.86%
Co-operative Commonwealth	Wilfred Perrin	972	21.35%	–
Labor–Progressive	R.L. Welsh	152	3.34%	–
Total		4,553	–	–
Rejected, spoiled and declined		78	–	–
Eligible electors / turnout		6,141	75.41%	-6.90%
Social Credit hold		Swing		15.52%
Source(s) Source: "Macleod Official Results 1944 Alberta general election". Alberta Heritage Community Foundation.

=== 1948 ===
1948 Alberta general election
Party	Candidate	Votes	%	±%
Social Credit	James Hartley	2,852	67.58%	13.99%
Co-operative Commonwealth	Joseph E. Peterson	756	17.91%	-3.43%
Liberal	Everett E. Marjerison	612	14.50%	–
Total		4,220	–	–
Rejected, spoiled and declined		268	–	–
Eligible electors / turnout		6,620	67.79%	-7.62%
Social Credit hold		Swing		8.90%
Source(s) Source: "Macleod Official Results 1948 Alberta general election". Alberta Heritage Community Foundation.

=== 1952 ===
1952 Alberta general election
Party	Candidate	Votes	%	±%
Social Credit	James Hartley	3,232	71.81	+4.22
Liberal	Michael J. Jordan	773	17.17	+2.67
Co-operative Commonwealth	Joseph E. Peterson	496	11.02	-6.89
Total		4,501	94.03	–
Rejected, spoiled and declined		286	5.97	+0.00
Turnout		4,787	83.94	+16.14
Eligible voters		5,703		
Social Credit hold		Swing		+0.78
Source(s) "Macleod". Canadian Elections Database.

=== 1955 ===
1955 Alberta general election
Party	Candidate	Votes	%	±%
Social Credit	James Hartley	3,037	60.95	-10.86
Liberal	Charles V. Bennett	1,946	39.05	+21.88
Total		4,983	94.68	–
Rejected, spoiled and declined		280	5.32	-0.65
Turnout		5,236	66.31	-17.63
Eligible voters		7,937		
Social Credit hold		Swing		-16.37
Source(s) "Macleod". Canadian Elections Database.

=== 1959 ===
1959 Alberta general election
Party	Candidate	Votes	%	±%
Social Credit	James Hartley	3,731	72.38	+11.43
Progressive Conservative	Leo E. Toone	949	18.41	–
Liberal	Dennis Arthur Mouser	475	9.21	-29.84
Total		5,155	99.65	–
Rejected, spoiled and declined		18	0.35	-4.97
Turnout		5,173	70.82	+4.51
Eligible voters		7,304		
Social Credit hold		Swing		-3.49
Source(s) "Macleod". Canadian Elections Database.

=== 1963 ===
1963 Alberta general election
Party	Candidate	Votes	%	±%
Social Credit	James Hartley	3,127	64.73	-7.65
Progressive Conservative	Allie Streeter	1,466	30.35	+11.94
New Democratic	John K. Head	238	4.93	–
Total		4,831	99.75	–
Rejected, spoiled and declined		12	0.25	-0.10
Turnout		4,843	65.65	-5.17
Eligible voters		7,377		
Social Credit hold		Swing		-9.79
Source(s) "Macleod". Canadian Elections Database.

=== 1967 ===
1967 Alberta general election
Party	Candidate	Votes	%	±%
Social Credit	Leighton E. Buckwell	2,822	52.10	-12.63
Progressive Conservative	George Whitehead	1,773	32.73	+2.38
New Democratic	Sid J. Cornish	673	12.42	+7.50
Liberal	Melba J. Grimm	149	2.75	–
Total		5,417	99.19	–
Rejected, spoiled and declined		44	0.81	+0.56
Turnout		5,461	69.12	+3.47
Eligible voters		7,901		
Social Credit hold		Swing		-7.51
Source(s) "Macleod". Canadian Elections Database.

=== 1971 ===
1971 Alberta general election
Party	Candidate	Votes	%	±%
Social Credit	Leighton E. Buckwell	3,399	50.91%	-1.19%
Progressive Conservative	Danny Le Grandeur	2,808	42.05%	9.32%
New Democratic	Sid J. Cornish	470	7.04%	-5.38%
Total		6,677	–	–
Rejected, Spoiled and Declined		31	–	–
Eligible electors / Turnout		8,701	77.09%	7.98%
Social Credit hold		Swing		-5.26%
Source(s) Source: "Macleod Official Results 1971 Alberta general election". Alberta Heritage Community Foundation.

=== 1975 ===
1975 Alberta general election
Party	Candidate	Votes	%	±%
Progressive Conservative	Thomas J. Walker	3,671	55.70%	13.64%
Social Credit	Leighton E. Buckwell	2,359	35.79%	-15.11%
New Democratic	Kay Cairns	330	5.01%	-2.03%
Liberal	Bill Olafson	231	3.50%	–
Total		6,591	–	–
Rejected, spoiled and declined		39	–	–
Eligible electors / turnout		9,833	67.43%	-9.67%
Progressive Conservative gain from Social Credit		Swing		5.53%
Source(s) Source: "Macleod Official Results 1975 Alberta general election". Alberta Heritage Community Foundation.

=== 1979 ===
1979 Alberta general election
Party	Candidate	Votes	%	±%
Progressive Conservative	LeRoy Fjordbotten	4,189	58.89%	3.20%
Social Credit	Roelof A. Heinen	2,369	33.31%	-2.48%
New Democratic	Kathleen M. Cairns	384	5.40%	0.39%
Liberal	Alfred Saddleback	171	2.40%	-1.10%
Total		7,113	–	–
Rejected, spoiled and declined		12	–	–
Eligible electors / turnout		10,994	64.81%	-2.62%
Progressive Conservative hold		Swing		2.84%
Source(s) Source: "Macleod Official Results 1979 Alberta general election". Alberta Heritage Community Foundation.

=== 1982 ===
1982 Alberta general election
Party	Candidate	Votes	%	±%
Progressive Conservative	LeRoy Fjordbotten	6,136	71.52%	12.63%
Western Canada Concept	Ellis Oviatt	1,293	15.07%	–
New Democratic	Paul Abildgaard	546	6.36%	-32.34%
Independent	Dennis Irvine	280	3.26%	–
Independent	Scot MacLean	180	2.10%	–
Liberal	Inez Watmough	144	1.68%	-0.73%
Total		8,579	–	–
Rejected, spoiled and declined		22	–	–
Eligible electors / turnout		11,908	72.23%	7.42%
Progressive Conservative hold		Swing		15.43%
Source(s) Source: "Macleod Official Results 1982 Alberta general election". Alberta Heritage Community Foundation.

=== 1986 ===
1986 Alberta general election
Party	Candidate	Votes	%	±%
Progressive Conservative	LeRoy Fjordbotten	4,054	66.29%	-5.24%
Representative	Ed Shimek	1,303	21.30%	–
New Democratic	Laurie Fiedler	759	12.41%	6.05%
Total		6,116	–	–
Rejected, spoiled and declined		33	–	–
Eligible electors / turnout		11,624	52.90%	-19.33%
Progressive Conservative hold		Swing		-5.74%
Source(s) Source: "Macleod Official Results 1986 Alberta general election". Alberta Heritage Community Foundation.

=== 1989 ===
1989 Alberta general election
Party	Candidate	Votes	%	±%
Progressive Conservative	LeRoy Fjordbotten	4,459	67.49%	1.20%
New Democratic	Mike Dawson	1,292	19.56%	7.14%
Liberal	Darrell Piehl	856	12.96%	–
Total		6,607	–	–
Rejected, spoiled and declined		28	–	–
Eligible electors / turnout		11,266	58.89%	5.99%
Progressive Conservative hold		Swing		1.48%
Source(s) Source: "Macleod Official Results 1989 Alberta general election". Alberta Heritage Community Foundation.

== Plebiscite results ==
=== 1957 liquor plebiscite ===
1957 Alberta liquor plebiscite results: Macleod
Question A: Do you approve additional types of outlets for the sale of beer, wine and spirituous liquor subject to a local vote?
Ballot choice	Votes	%
No	1,909	50.22%
Yes	1,892	49.78%
Total votes	3,801	100%
Rejected, spoiled and declined	46	
7,476 eligible electors, turnout 51.46%

On October 30, 1957, a stand-alone plebiscite was held province wide in all 50 of the then current provincial electoral districts in Alberta. The government decided to consult Alberta voters to decide on liquor sales and mixed drinking after a divisive debate in the Legislature. The plebiscite was intended to deal with the growing demand for reforming antiquated liquor control laws.

The plebiscite was conducted in two parts. Question A, asked in all districts, asked the voters if the sale of liquor should be expanded in Alberta, while Question B, asked in a handful of districts within the corporate limits of Calgary and Edmonton, asked if men and women were allowed to drink together in establishments.

Province wide Question A of the plebiscite passed in 33 of the 50 districts while Question B passed in all five districts. Macleod voted against the proposal by a very slim margin. The voter turnout in the district was well above the province wide average of 46% with well over half the electors turning out to vote.

Official district returns were released to the public on December 31, 1957. The Social Credit government in power at the time did not consider the results binding. However the results of the vote led the government to repeal all existing liquor legislation and introduce an entirely new Liquor Act.

Municipal districts lying inside electoral districts that voted against the plebiscite such as Macleod were designated Local Option Zones by the Alberta Liquor Control Board and considered effective dry zones. Business owners that wanted a licence had to petition for a binding municipal plebiscite in order to be granted a licence.

== See also ==
- List of Alberta provincial electoral districts
- Canadian provincial electoral districts
- Fort Macleod, a town in southwest Alberta
