= The Famous Five (Canada) =

Five prominent Canadian women's rights advocates

The Famous Five (French: Célèbres cinq), also known as The Valiant Five, and initially as The Alberta Five, were five prominent Canadian suffragists who advocated for women and children: Henrietta Muir Edwards, Nellie McClung, Louise McKinney, Emily Murphy, and Irene Parlby. On August 27, 1927, they petitioned the federal government to refer the issue of the eligibility of women to be senator to the Supreme Court of Canada. This petition was the foundation of the Persons Case, a leading constitutional decision. Although most Canadian women had the vote in federal elections and all provinces but Quebec by 1927, the case was part of a larger drive for political equality. This was the first step towards equality for women in Canada and was the start to the first wave of feminism.

The question the federal government posed to the Supreme Court was: "Does the word 'Persons' in Section 24 of the British North America Act, 1867, include female persons?" In 1928, the Supreme Court unanimously held that women were not "qualified persons" within the meaning of s. 24 of the British North America Act, 1867. The five women appealed that ruling to the Judicial Committee of the Privy Council, at that time the highest court of appeal in the British Empire. On October 18, 1929, the Judicial Committee overruled the Supreme Court and held that women were "qualified persons" and eligible to be appointed to the Senate. Some saw this as "radical change"; others saw it as a restoration of the original framing of the English constitutional documents, including the 1689 Bill of Rights, which uses only the term person, not the term man (or woman for that matter). Some others have interpreted the Privy Council rule as causing a change in the Canadian judicial approach to the Canadian constitution, an approach that has come to be known as the "living tree doctrine".

== The Five ==
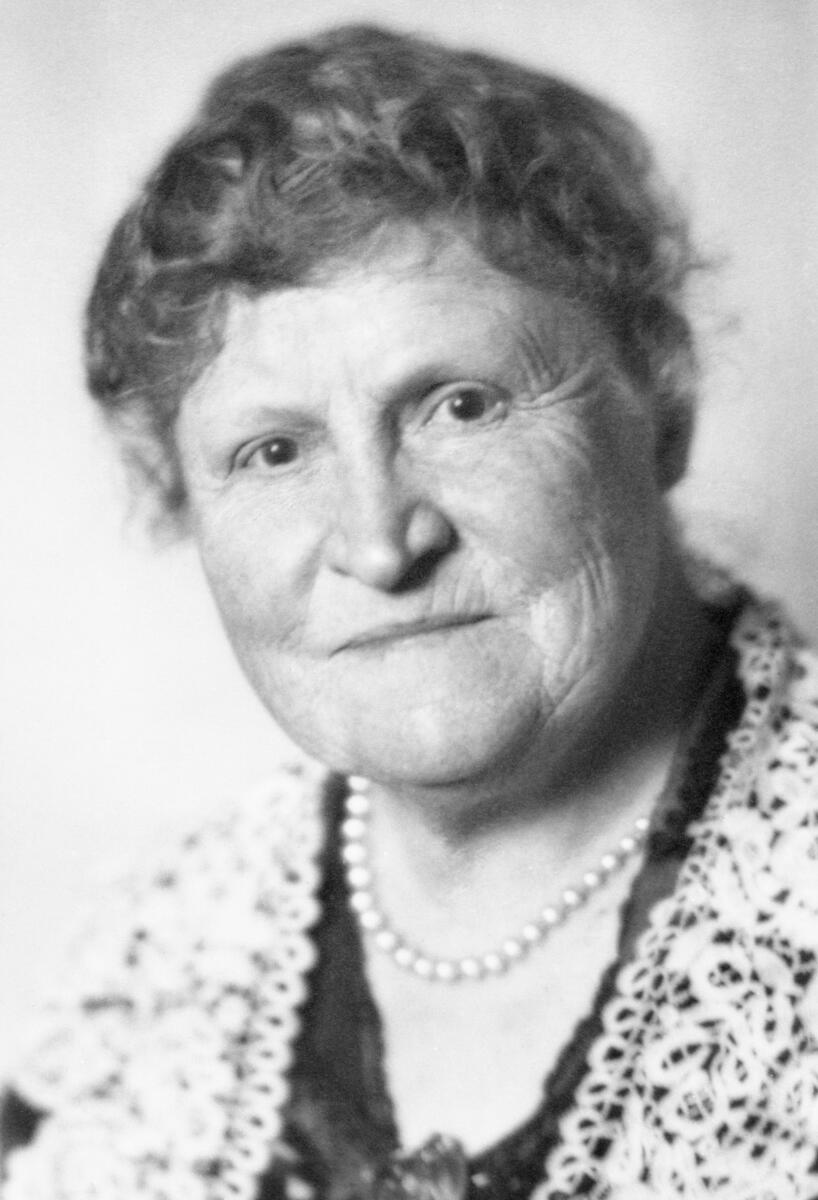
Henrietta Muir Edwards

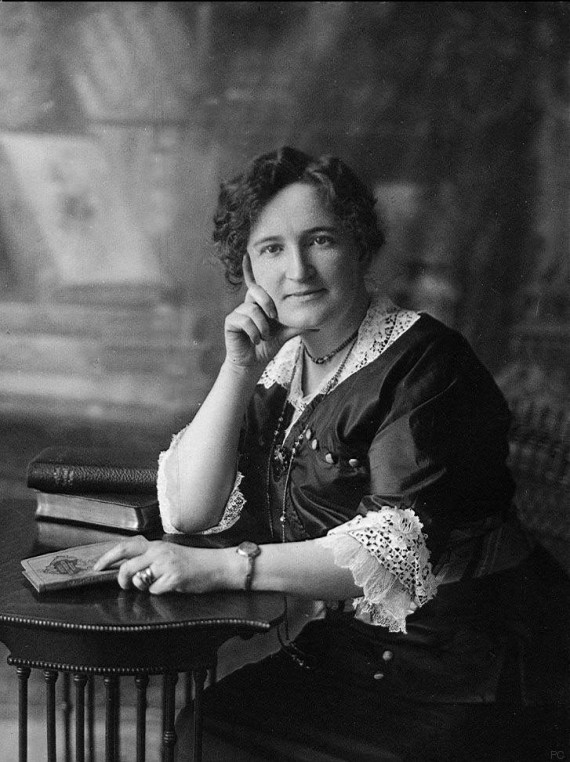
Nellie McClung

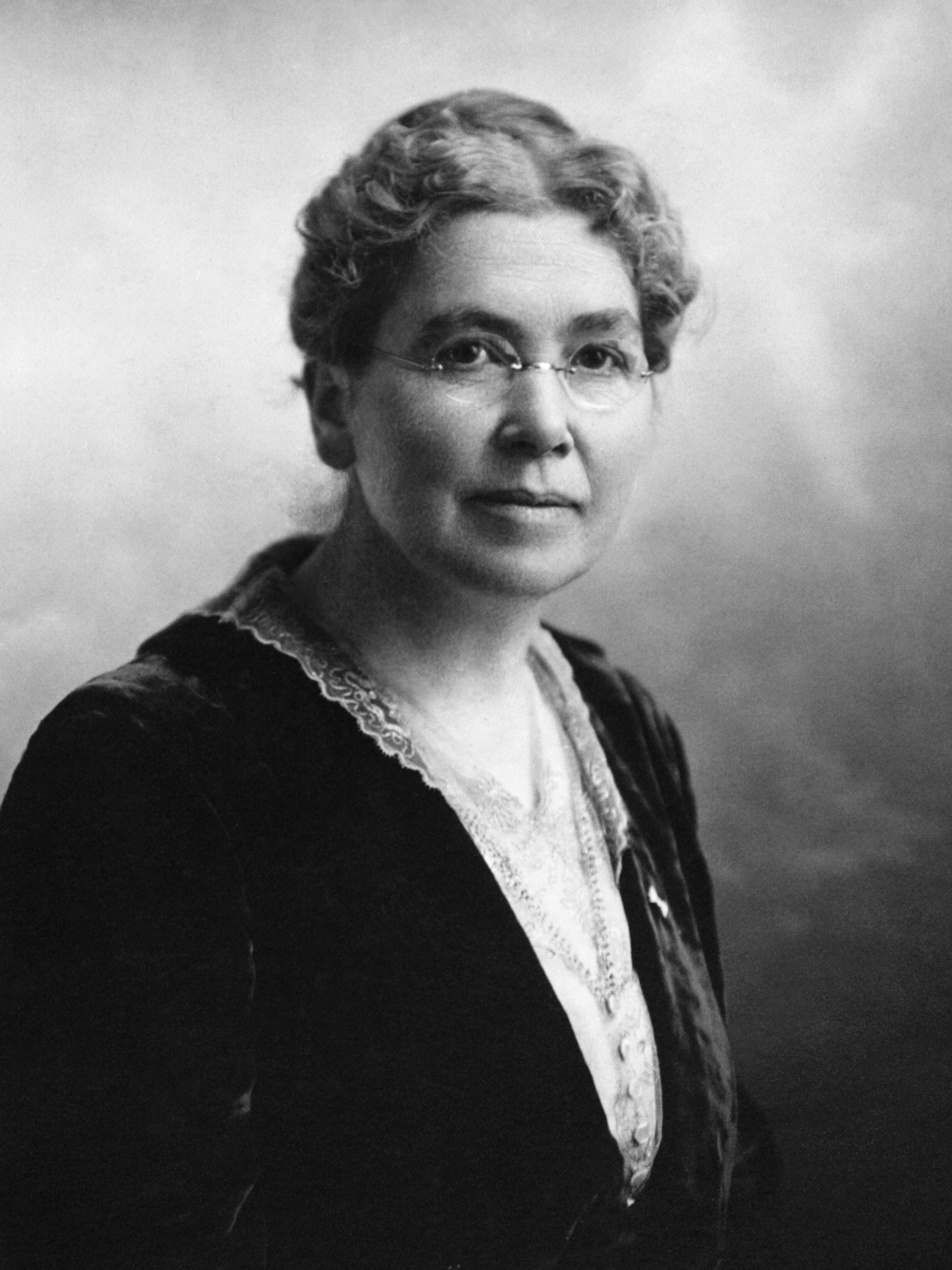
Louise McKinney

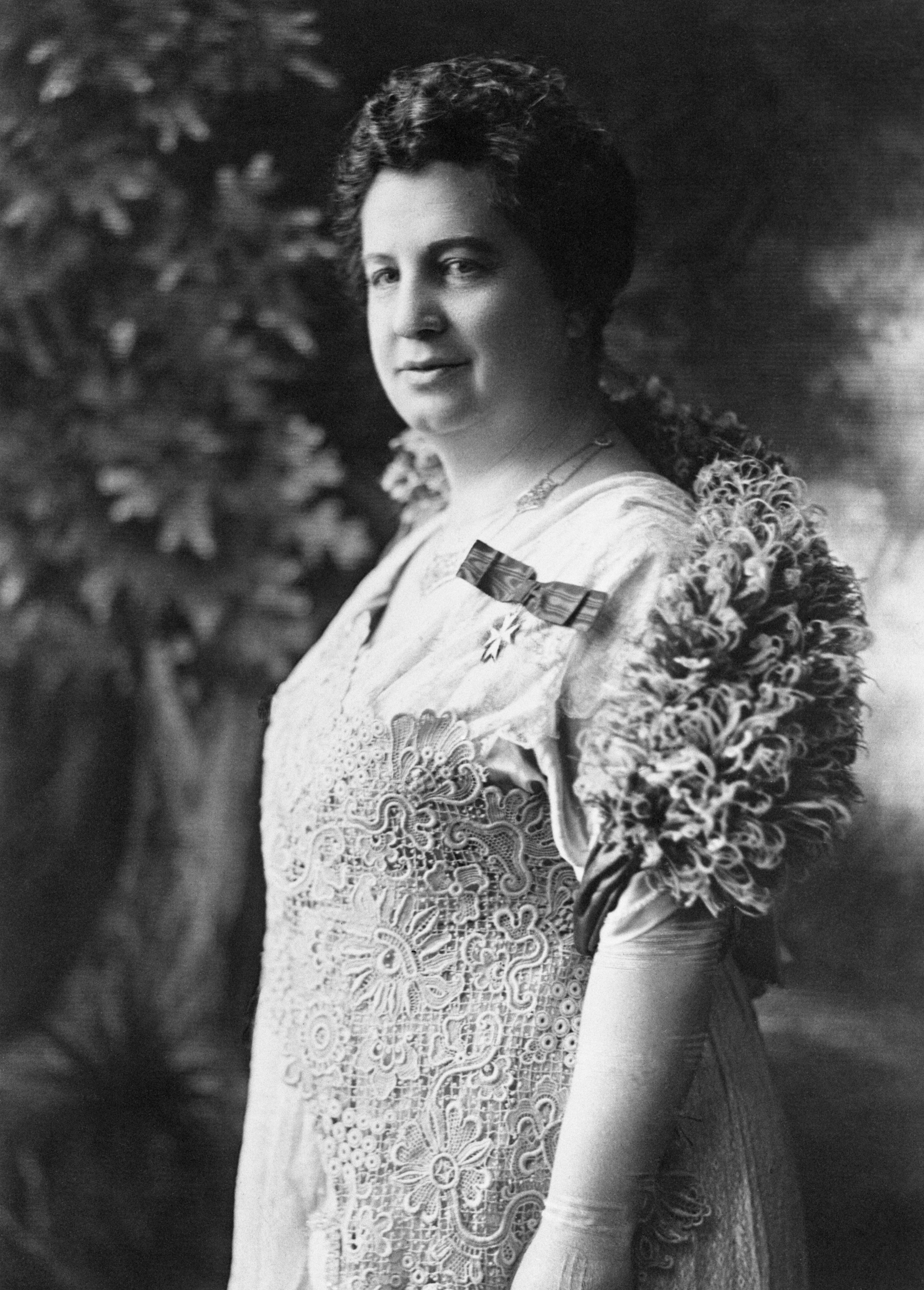
Emily Murphy

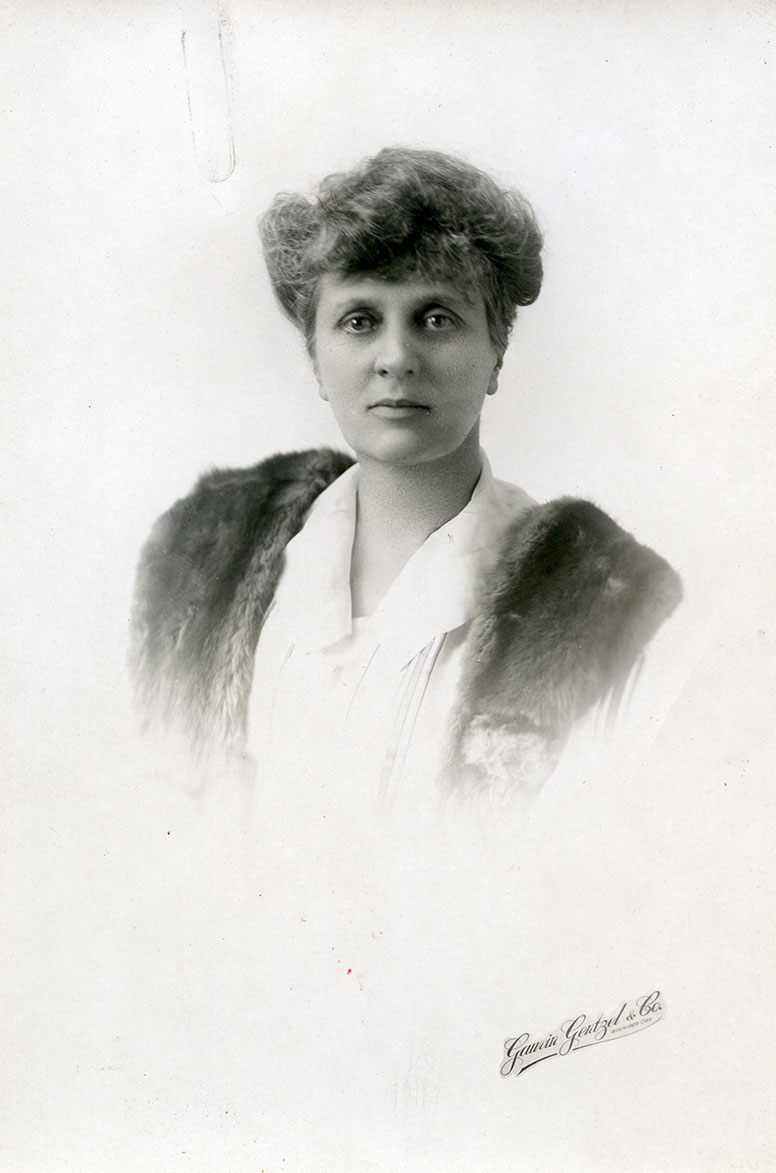
Irene Parlby

The Famous Five were a group of Canadian women's rights advocates

The women of the Famous Five included Emily Murphy, Henrietta Muir Edwards, Nellie McClung, Louise McKinney, and Irene Parlby. These five women represent iconic powerful movements and change within Canada, as they devoted their lives to advocacy in the 1880s, through to the 1890s. As the group first convened in Alberta, the five were initially referred to as The Alberta Five by the media. However, as a result of the group's importance to Canada as a whole, the group was eventually referred to as The Famous Five.

=== Henrietta Muir Edwards ===
Henrietta Muir Edwards, author and researcher on women's topics, held an influence within the National Council of Women of Canada and held chairmanship of the Committee in Law in the National Council of Women for more than 35 years. She was also a Red Cross leader during World War I. Edwards was the secretary of the National Subcommittee which focused on thrift and economy in Canadian homes. She was also a founding member of the Victorian Order of Nurses.

=== Nellie McClung ===
Nellie McClung's jobs in her lifetime included teacher, author, public speaker, temperance activist, internationally known women's rights activist, and politician {Warne, Literature as Pulpit]. In 1918, she was a member of the Dominion War Council and the only woman representative at the League of Nations. McClung famously said "I‘ve never thought minding my own business is much of a virtue. Too often it‘s just an excuse for not taking action when action needs taking!". She represented Canada at the Ecumenical Council of the Methodist church in 1921 and was the first woman on the Canadian Broadcasting Corporation Board of the Governors. In 1921, McClung was elected to the Alberta legislature as an MLA in Edmonton for the Liberal Party. She served one term, not being re-elected in 1926. She was a member of the Political Equality League of Manitoba, and she played the leading role in the Mock Parliament held on January 29, 1914, at the Walker Theatre in Winnipeg, which humorously discussed Votes for Men . In the 1960s, after McClung's name had not been mentioned for nearly a decade, feminists had rediscovered and had given McClung and the famous five their fame. McClung was very well known for her passion for the independence of women and her drive in order to achieve the rights women deserve.

=== Louise McKinney ===
Louise McKinney became one of the first two women elected to a legislature in the British Empire, and the first to take her seat. She was a founder of the Woman's Christian Temperance Union in Alberta and the West – she was the organization's vice-president for more than 22 years beginning in 1906 – and regularly attended World Meetings of the WCTU. She signed the appeal to the Privy Council in 1929. In 1931, she became president of the Canadian Union, Woman's Christian Temperance Union. McKinney was also named to be Commissioner for the first General Council of the United Church of Canada, and was the only woman to sign the Basis of Union.

=== Emily Murphy ===
Emily Murphy stood out among the Famous Five, as she was the British Empire's first female judge. Emily was appointed to the office of Magistrate of the Edmonton Juvenile Court in 1916, and later became the magistrate of the newly created Women's Court. At the time, no woman had held such a position, and many men objected.

During her career as a writer, Murphy used the pen name "Janey Canuck". In 1922, she wrote The Black Candle which detailed her beliefs on race and drug use in Canada and strongly influenced the drug policy of the day.

In 1958, the Government of Canada had named Emily Murphy a Person of Nation Historic Significance. Several decades even after the Person's case, the Senate of Canada had voted to acknowledge the five women in the “Famous Five” as honorary senators.

=== Irene Parlby ===
In 1916, Irene Parlby was elected as the first president of the United Farm Women of Alberta, and in 1921 was elected to the Alberta legislature and received a cabinet post in the United Farmers of Alberta government, becoming the second woman in the British Empire to hold ministerial rank. She was also the first female Cabinet minister in Alberta, and still serving in that capacity at the time of the court case. She was a cabinet minister until the downfall of the government in 1935. Parlby worked with the Red Cross during World War I and later served on the Board of Governors of the University of Alberta.

== The Persons Case ==
During the year 1917 a discussion began surrounding women and their position in the senate, for 10 years this debate continued, however, was disregarded in 1927 as the Canadian BNA act implied it was impossible In August 1927, Emily Murphy invited four women activists, Nellie McClung, Irene Parlby, Louise McKinney and Henrietta Muir Edwards, to her home in Edmonton to discuss plans to petition the Canadian government to submit a reference question to the Supreme Court of Canada regarding the interpretation of the word persons in the British North America Act.

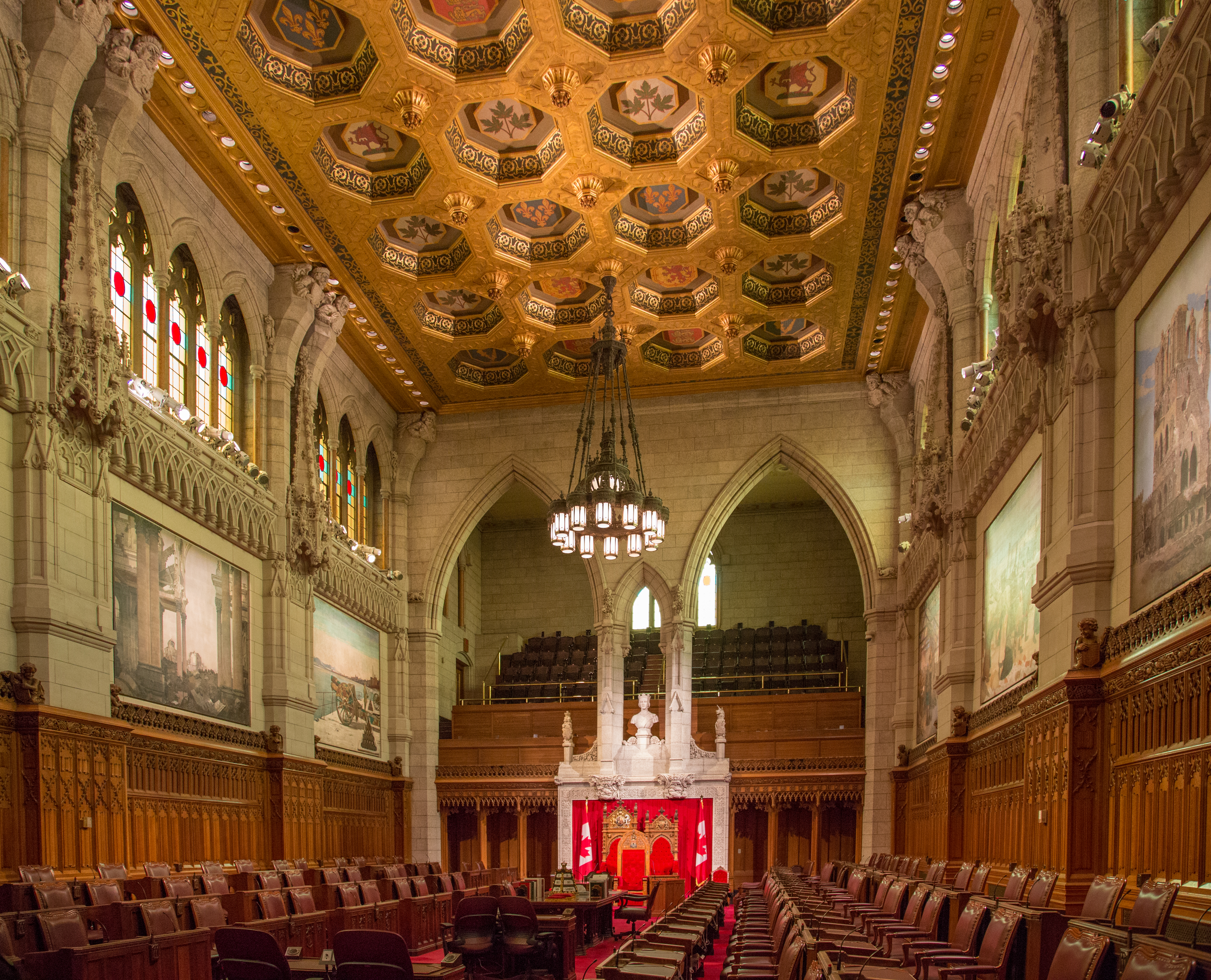
Chambers of the Senate of Canada in Centre Block. Women were made eligible for the Senate after a petition from the Famous Five resulted in a court decision that concluded the term persons encompassed women.

On 27 August 1927, the five women, who became known as the Famous Five, sent a petition to the Governor General of Canada. The petition requested that the government ask the Supreme Court if power was vested in the governor general in council, the prime minister of Canada, or both, to appoint a woman to the Senate of Canada; and if it was constitutionally possible to make provisions that would allow for the appointment of a woman. In response to the petition, the Canadian government referred the following question to the Supreme Court: "Does the word 'Persons' in section 24 of the British North America Act, 1867, include female persons?"

On 24 April 1928, the Supreme Court held that women were not "qualified persons" within the meaning of s. 24 of the British North America Act. The ruling was based on the premise that the term should be interpreted in the same way as in 1867, and that the act would have specifically mentioned women if they had meant to make an exception for the Senate.

The Five then appealed the decision of the Supreme Court to the Judicial Committee of the Privy Council. On 18 October 1929, the Judicial Committee allowed their appeal and overturned the decision of the Supreme Court. The Judicial Committee concluded that the term " 'persons' does include women, and that women are eligible to be summoned to and become members of the Senate of Canada". The judgment was delivered by the Lord Chancellor, Viscount Sankey, who stated:

[The] exclusion of women from all public offices is a relic of days more barbarous than ours ... their Lordships do not think it right to apply rigidly to Canada of to-day the decisions and the reasonings therefor which commended themselves ... to those who had to apply the law in different circumstances, in different centuries, to countries in different stages of development.

— John Sankey, 1st Viscount Sankey

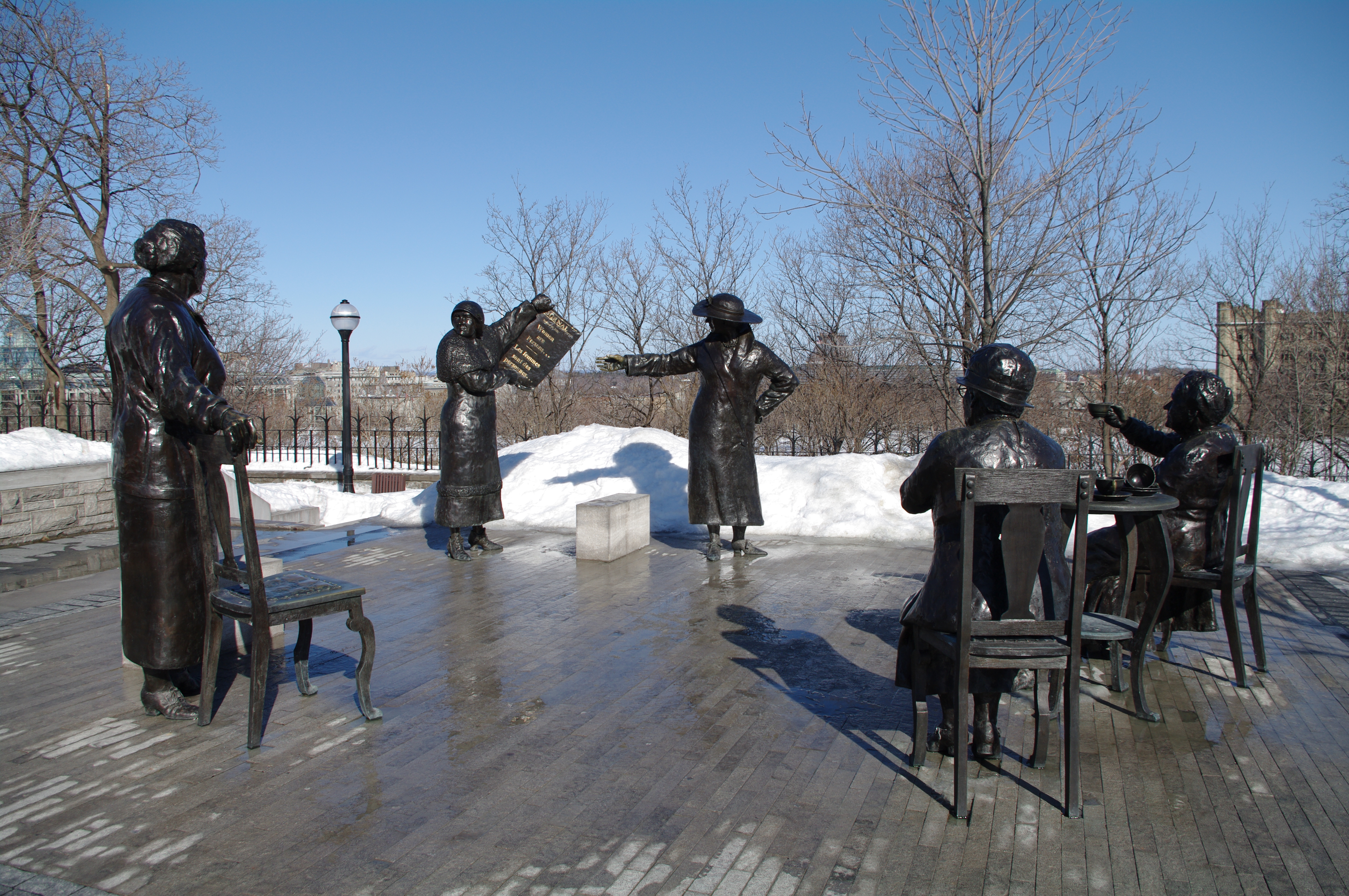
Statues of The Famous Five celebrating the decision of the Privy Council, at Parliament Hill in Ottawa, Ontario

As a result of the Famous 5's determination and advocacy, the decision to overturn the supreme court and give women the title of “persons” was enacted. October 18, 1929 was officially the start to a movement that would live on for generations and invoke four new waves of feminism.

== Legacy ==
=== Honorary senators ===
The Famous Five built their foundation for women's rights on the idea of women in the Senate. However, none of the Famous Five ever became a part of the Senate, they opened the doors for Cairine Wilson, the first female senator. The achievement of personhood for women had been a monumental change which gave more power to women.

Some might well question the overall significance of the decision, noting that by the 1920s the Senate of Canada was a largely powerless body. The more powerful House of Commons of Canada had elected its first female member (Agnes Macphail) in 1921, well before the Persons Case. However, the precedent did establish the principle that women could hold any political office in Canada. Moreover, the Five clearly did devote their energies to increasing women's participation on legislative bodies with greater power: three had been members of the Alberta legislature. The controversy surrounding the women has made commemoration difficult. The five women were activists in a variety of areas in their pursuit to better the conditions for women and children.

=== Opinions on the Famous Five ===
The famous five were women rights advocates, however, advocacy was a lifestyle to them. Each of the famous five women had strong beliefs in other aspects of life that they would protest for. Some individuals believed they were powerful women but others took no interest in their fights or even actively opposed some of their ideas, such as opposition to non-white immigration and their successful campaigns to have eugenics legislation introduced in Canadian provinces, which resulted in the sterilization of thousands of those deemed "mentally deficient" or "insane" in Alberta and elsewhere. Emily Murphy was not shy with her opinions and her outspoken nature had a tendency to give her a negative reputation. She wrote letters of her opinions to police chiefs, government officials, social service agencies and judicial officials about the extent of drug traffic and possible cures. Nellie McClung was known as the most memorable and popular of the Famous Five. Her causes included women's right to vote, prohibition, women in the church and women in public life. Henrietta Muir Edwards was described as "tenacious" with her work with prohibition.

The five women were activists in a variety of areas in their pursuit to better the conditions for women and children. Emily Murphy dealt with single mothers and issues of child support, child welfare, and adoption by lobbying for women's rights. Nellie McClung favoured free medical and dental treatment for school children as well as mothers' allowances and better property rights for women. She was open to divorce and birth control but opposed the sale and use of liquor. Louise McKinney believed strongly in the "evils of alcohol" and pushed to enact prohibition measures. She advocated excluding cigarettes from parcels sent to soldiers in World War I in 1917. She supported reasonable measures for social welfare and health as well as introducing bills intended to make prohibition more effective, to improve the lot of immigrants and bring better security to widows. She was responsible for the introduction of a motion which led to the Dower Act. Irene Parlby in her position as cabinet minister in Alberta pursued these goals expressed by McKinney. Henrietta Edwards worked with property law and sought to protect women and children.

=== Commemorations ===
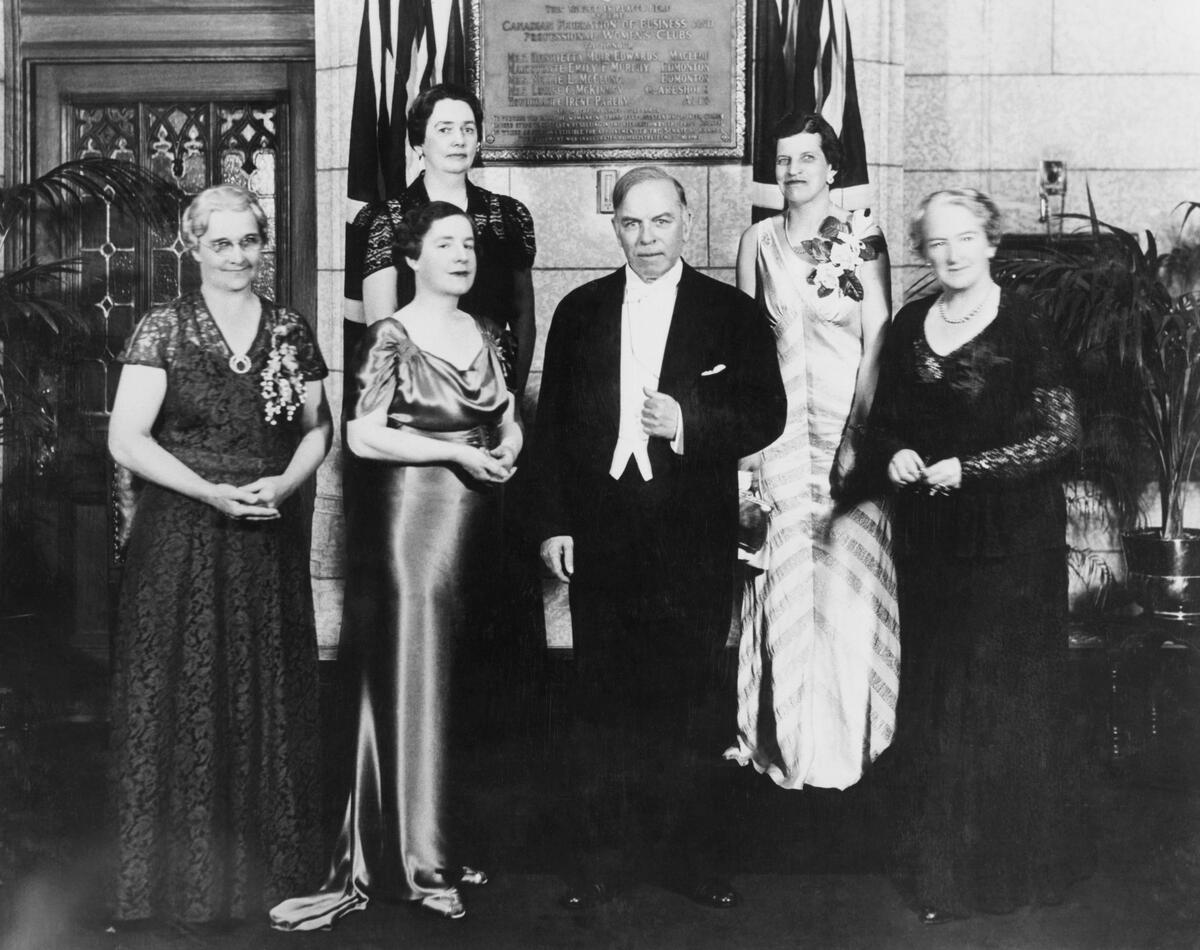
Unveiling of a plaque commemorating the Famous Five, June 11, 1938. (Front row, L–R): Muir Edwards, daughter-in-law of Henrietta Muir Edwards; J. C. Kenwood, daughter of Judge Emily Murphy; Mackenzie King; Nellie McClung. (Rear row, L–R): Senators Iva Campbell Fallis, Cairine Wilson.

The Famous Five have been commemorated with individual and group plaques in the foyer and antechamber of Canada's Senate, and two identical sculptures by Canadian artist Barbara Paterson, one on Parliament Hill in Ottawa, the other at the Olympic Plaza in Calgary. The sculpture on Parliament Hill was unveiled on October 18, 2000, in a public ceremony that included songs in French and English, Inuit dancers, and speeches by Governor General Adrienne Clarkson and Prime Minister Jean Chrétien. A sculpture of the Famous Five by sculptor Helen Granger Young stands on the grounds of the Manitoba Legislature in Winnipeg. Commissioned by the Nellie McClung Foundation, it was unveiled at a ceremony on June 18, 2010.

The City of Edmonton has named one park in its River Valley Parks System after each of the "Famous Five".

Murphy had many accomplishments, such as becoming the first president of the Federated Women's Institute of Canada, vice-president of National Council of Women of Canada, president of Canadian Women's Press Club, director of the Canadian Council of Child Welfare, vice-president of the Canadian Association of Child Protection, first president of the Women's Canadian Club of Edmonton and vice-president of the Social Service Council of Canada. Emily Murphy also received many honours for her life's work including being decorated by King George V to be a Lady of Grace of the Order of St. John of Jerusalem.

Irene Parlby was honoured in 1935 at spring convocation at the University of Alberta with an honorary doctor of laws degree. Tributes in honour of Henrietta Edwards can be found on a plaque in the Senate Chamber in Ottawa and another in the post office in Fort Macleod. Nellie McClung spoke in Calgary after Edwards' passing and spoke of Edwards, "who for 40 years was the convener of laws for the National Council of Women" should not be forgotten.

The Five were commemorated in the 2001 Journey Series of Canada's fifty-dollar bill, along with Thérèse Casgrain, a feminist and politician from Quebec. In December 2011, the Bank of Canada announced that the Famous Five would not appear on the redesigned $50 Frontier Series banknote that it issued in 2012.

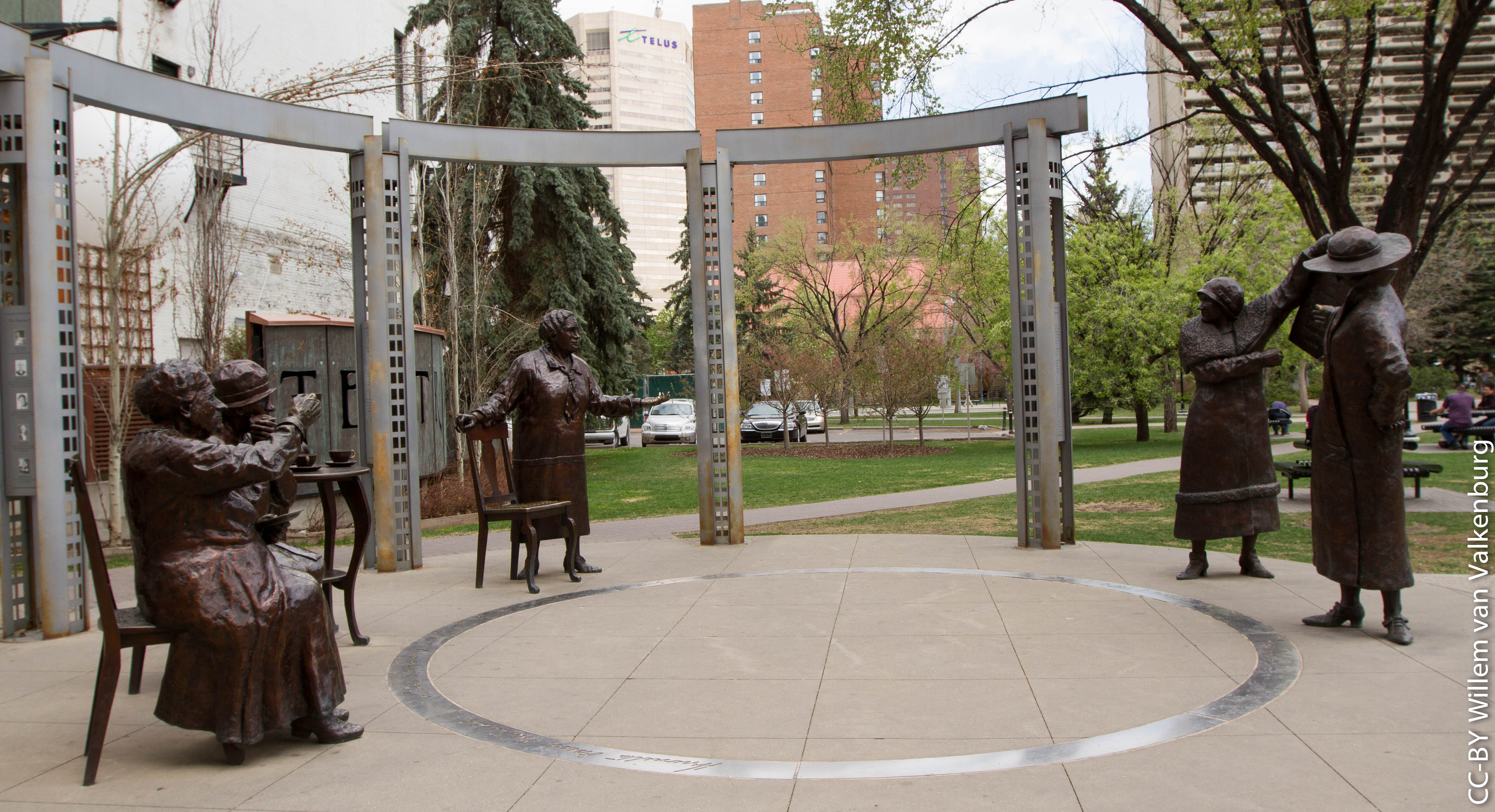
Statues of The Famous Five in Calgary, Alberta

The achievement of personhood for women had been a monumental change which gave more power to women. To honour the Five and continue to involve women in leadership roles in Canada, Frances Wright and others established the non-profit Famous Five Foundation on October 18, 1996, the 70th anniversary of the decision of the Judicial Committee of the Privy Council.

Calgary Wild FC of the Northern Super League includes a five-pointed "W" in its crest in honour of The Famous Five.

== See also ==
- Eugenic Feminism
- Feminism in Canada
- History of feminism
- List of suffragists and suffragettes
- List of Supreme Court of Canada cases
