= Claresholm =

- Town
- Town of Claresholm
- Motto: Now you're living ... Now you're home
- Location of Claresholm in Alberta Claresholm (Canada)
- Coordinates: 50°01′11″N 113°34′58″W
- Country: Canada
- Province: Alberta
- Region: Southern Alberta
- Census division: 3
- Municipal district: Municipal District of Willow Creek No. 26
- Incorporated
  - Village: May 30, 1903
  - Town: August 31, 1905

Government
  - Mayor: Brad Schlossberger
  - Governing body: Claresholm Town Council

Area (2021)
  - Land: 10.51 km^{2} (4.06 sq mi)
- Elevation: 1,030 m (3,380 ft)

Population (2021)
  - Total: 3,804
  - Density: 362.1/km^{2} (938/sq mi)
- Time zone: UTC−06:00 (Alberta Time)
- Postal code span: T0L 0T0
- Area codes: +1-403, +1-587
- Highways: Highways 2 Highway 520
- Waterways: Willow Creek

Claresholm is a town located within southern Alberta, Canada. It is located on Highway 2, approximately 91 km (57 mi) northwest of the City of Lethbridge and 125 km (78 mi) south of the City of Calgary.

== History ==
The location was originally a watering stop for steam engines on the Canadian Pacific Railway line along the Macleod Trail when the trains first arrived in the area in 1891. The first settlers arrived in 1902, and the village was established in 1903. Claresholm was incorporated as a town in 1905, the year Alberta became a province. The community was named after Clare Niblock (1856-1942), a pioneer citizen.

In 1913, Alberta established a demonstration farm and School of Agriculture at Claresholm. The first hospital in Claresholm opened in 1921 and was replaced in 1939. The Claresholm General Hospital was built in 1972 and is an active treatment facility with 16 beds.

Royal Canadian Air Force Station Claresholm was established near the town in 1941 to train pilots for service in World War II. It first opened on June 9, 1941 as a British Commonwealth Air Training Plan base. No. 15 Service Flying Training School operated at the base from its opening until March 1945. In 1951, the base was used to train pilots for the Korean War and operated as No. 3 Flying Training School. It also trained NATO pilots. The base closed in 1958 and the hangars were converted to industrial use. A portion of the former base operates as Claresholm Industrial Airport. Among the artifacts in the Claresholm Museum from the air base is a Link Trainer.

One of the Famous Five involved in the Persons Case, Louise McKinney, lived in Claresholm and was elected as the Member of the Legislative Assembly of Alberta for the area in the 1917 provincial election.

The Claresholm highway massacre took place just north of Claresholm on Alberta Highway 2 on December 15, 2011. The suspect killed three people then turned the gun on himself in a murder–suicide.

== Geography ==
=== Climate ===
Claresholm experiences a humid continental climate (Köppen climate classification Dfb). During winter, Chinook winds have been known to move temperatures from well below freezing to well above in a matter of hours.

Climate data for Claresholm, Alberta (1991–2020 normals, extremes 1959–present)
| Month | Jan | Feb | Mar | Apr | May | Jun | Jul | Aug | Sep | Oct | Nov | Dec | Year |
|---|---|---|---|---|---|---|---|---|---|---|---|---|---|
| Record high humidex | 19.0 | 17.2 | 24.6 | 28.0 | 49.2 | 48.3 | 39.9 | 39.4 | 34.3 | 27.8 | 23.5 | 20.6 | 49.2 |
| Record high °C (°F) | 19.5 (67.1) | 24.0 (75.2) | 24.8 (76.6) | 29.0 (84.2) | 33.0 (91.4) | 35.7 (96.3) | 36.8 (98.2) | 39.7 (103.5) | 34.6 (94.3) | 30.0 (86.0) | 23.7 (74.7) | 20.9 (69.6) | 39.7 (103.5) |
| Mean daily maximum °C (°F) | 0.4 (32.7) | 1.8 (35.2) | 5.9 (42.6) | 11.7 (53.1) | 17.3 (63.1) | 20.9 (69.6) | 25.2 (77.4) | 25.1 (77.2) | 20.0 (68.0) | 12.9 (55.2) | 5.4 (41.7) | 0.9 (33.6) | 12.3 (54.1) |
| Daily mean °C (°F) | −6.4 (20.5) | −5.1 (22.8) | −0.9 (30.4) | 4.7 (40.5) | 10.1 (50.2) | 14.0 (57.2) | 17.2 (63.0) | 16.7 (62.1) | 11.9 (53.4) | 5.6 (42.1) | −1.1 (30.0) | −5.8 (21.6) | 5.1 (41.2) |
| Mean daily minimum °C (°F) | −13.2 (8.2) | −12.0 (10.4) | −7.7 (18.1) | −2.3 (27.9) | 2.8 (37.0) | 7.0 (44.6) | 9.3 (48.7) | 8.3 (46.9) | 3.8 (38.8) | −1.7 (28.9) | −7.6 (18.3) | −12.5 (9.5) | −2.1 (28.1) |
| Record low °C (°F) | −41.1 (−42.0) | −40.0 (−40.0) | −38.9 (−38.0) | −27.2 (−17.0) | −11.3 (11.7) | −2.8 (27.0) | 0.0 (32.0) | −3.0 (26.6) | −13.7 (7.3) | −28.0 (−18.4) | −37.0 (−34.6) | −44.0 (−47.2) | −44.0 (−47.2) |
| Record low wind chill | −45.3 | −43.0 | −42.6 | −28.3 | −14.5 | −4.1 | — | — | −16.0 | −29.5 | −42.8 | −45.8 | −45.8 |
| Average precipitation mm (inches) | 13.1 (0.52) | 14.9 (0.59) | 21.9 (0.86) | 33.2 (1.31) | 67.9 (2.67) | 92.9 (3.66) | 46.8 (1.84) | 42.6 (1.68) | 42.1 (1.66) | 19.7 (0.78) | 17.7 (0.70) | 15.6 (0.61) | 428.4 (16.88) |
| Average rainfall mm (inches) | 0.0 (0.0) | 0.9 (0.04) | 3.1 (0.12) | 19.6 (0.77) | 60.8 (2.39) | 108.0 (4.25) | 45.6 (1.80) | 48.1 (1.89) | 43.3 (1.70) | 10.1 (0.40) | 2.3 (0.09) | 0.2 (0.01) | 342 (13.46) |
| Average snowfall cm (inches) | 14.7 (5.8) | 16.5 (6.5) | 21.7 (8.5) | 12.1 (4.8) | 6.1 (2.4) | 0.0 (0.0) | 0.0 (0.0) | 0.2 (0.1) | 1.3 (0.5) | 7.3 (2.9) | 15.8 (6.2) | 15.4 (6.1) | 111.1 (43.8) |
| Average precipitation days (≥ 0.2 mm) | 6.5 | 6.5 | 7.8 | 8.8 | 10.1 | 12.1 | 9.0 | 7.2 | 7.4 | 5.9 | 6.4 | 6.4 | 94.1 |
| Average rainy days (≥ 0.2 mm) | 0.06 | 0.24 | 0.82 | 4.7 | 8.1 | 11.3 | 6.7 | 6.4 | 6.9 | 2.8 | 0.88 | 0.13 | 49.03 |
| Average snowy days (≥ 0.2 cm) | 4.9 | 5.3 | 6.1 | 2.7 | 1.2 | 0.0 | 0.0 | 0.06 | 0.29 | 2.6 | 4.4 | 4.4 | 31.95 |
| Average relative humidity (%) (at 15:00 LST) | 57.1 | 53.4 | 48.8 | 41.6 | 40.4 | 45.3 | 38.9 | 36.0 | 38.8 | 42.7 | 53.2 | 58.3 | 46.2 |
Source: Environment Canada

== Demographics ==
Historical population
| Year | Pop. | ±% |
|---|---|---|
| 1986 | 3,382 | — |
| 1991 | 3,297 | −2.5% |
| 1996 | 3,427 | +3.9% |
| 2001 | 3,622 | +5.7% |
| 2006 | 3,700 | +2.2% |
| 2011 | 3,378 | −8.7% |
| 2016 | 3,424 | +1.4% |
2011 count revised from original tabulation. Sources:

In the 2021 Census of Population conducted by Statistics Canada, the Town of Claresholm had a population of 3,804 living in 1,709 of its 1,826 total private dwellings, a change of 0.4% from its 2016 population of 3,790. With a land area of 10.51 km^{2} (4.06 sq mi), it had a population density of 361.9/km^{2} (937.4/sq mi) in 2021.

In the 2016 Census of Population conducted by Statistics Canada, the Town of Claresholm recorded a population of 3,780 living in 1,644 of its 1,742 total private dwellings, a 0.6% change from its 2011 population of 3,758. With a land area of 8.11 km^{2} (3.13 sq mi), it had a population density of 466.1/km^{2} (1,207.2/sq mi) in 2016.

== See also ==
- List of communities in Alberta
- List of towns in Alberta
