= William Morrison (Alberta politician) =

Canadian politician

Member of the Legislative Assembly of Alberta
- In office August 22, 1935 – October 5, 1935
- Preceded by: George Hoadley
- Succeeded by: William Aberhart
- Constituency: Okotoks-High River

Personal details
- Born: April 24, 1891 Megantic, Quebec
- Died: January 1, 1970 (aged 78) Medicine Hat, Alberta
- Party: Social Credit
- Occupation: farmer, church minister, soldier and politician

Military service
- Allegiance: Canada
- Branch/service: Royal Canadian Army
- Rank: Sergeant
- Unit: 5th Canadian Railway Troop and Edmonton Highlanders

Rev. William Morrison (April 24, 1891 – January 1, 1970) was a farmer, church minister, soldier and politician from Alberta, Canada. He served as a member of the Legislative Assembly of Alberta for a short time in 1935 sitting with the Social Credit caucus in government.

== Early life ==
William Morrison born on April 24, 1891, in Megantic, Quebec. His family moved west in 1906 and they settled at Okotoks, Alberta. He took his early schooling in Okotoks while helping his father run the farm. Morrison took his post secondary education at Robertson College he graduated in 1925. That year he was also ordained as a United Church Minister.

Morrison served several years in the Canadian Armed Forces attaining the rank of Sergeant. He served with the Edmonton Highlanders and the 5th Canadian Railway Troop.

== Political career ==
Morrison ran for a seat to the Alberta Legislature as a Social Credit candidate in the electoral district of Okotoks-High River in the 1935 Alberta general election. He defeated former cabinet minister George Hoadley and two other candidates with a landslide majority to pick up the seat for his party.

The first Social Credit caucus meeting saw Morrison sponsor a motion with John Hugill to confirm William Aberhart as party leader and Premier of the province. He also decided to vacate his seat for the new Premier who did not have one. He did so along with Clarence Tade who vacated his seat for Charles Ross the new Minister of Lands and Mines. Aberhart convinced Morrison to resign so that he could take the seat and provide cabinet representation to southern Alberta to quell complaints about the lack of ministers for the region. His resignation occurred before the newly elected Legislative Assembly had its first sitting.

After resigning Morrison regretted his decision telling the press that he made his decision with too much haste and he did not have time to think about it. Backlash from Morrison's campaign supporters living in and around his home town in Blackie, Alberta spilled over to the federal election campaign being waged in the Macleod electoral district at the time. His supporters threatened to deliver half the votes that Morrison got in the provincial election away from Social Credit candidate Ernest Hansell to incumbent UFA MP George Coote to ensure his re-election. That support did not quite materialize, however, and Coote was defeated.
