= Ross Ellis =

Canadian politician

Lieutenant Colonel Ross Laird Ellis (June 15, 1915 – March 10, 1983) was a politician and a military man from Alberta, Canada.

== Military career ==
Ellis primarily served in the Canadian Military. He joined in 1932 and rose through the ranks to become head of The Calgary Highlanders. He retired from active service in 1945 and bought a Chrysler dealership in High River, Alberta.

== Political career ==
Ross launched his political career in 1947 by getting elected to the High River town council. He became mayor until 1952 and served that position for 12 years until 1964.

Ross was elected as a member for the Legislative Assembly of Alberta in 1955 as the only member Liberal Conservative Coalition of Alberta for Okotoks-High River he defeated Alberta Social Credit Party cabinet minister Ivan Casey in an upset. In 1959 after the Liberal Conservative Coalition fell apart he ran as an Independent and lost to Ernest George Hansell from Social Credit.

In 1967 he became Town Manager of Hinton, Alberta. In 1975 he became Head of Tax Research Council. In his final years he moved to Adams Lake, British Columbia.

In his honor the Centre for Military and Strategic Studies at the University of Calgary holds an annual lecture series in his name.

Legislative Assembly of Alberta
| Preceded by Ivan Casey | MLA Okotoks-High River; 1955–1959 | Succeeded by Ernest George Hansell |
