= George Wolstenholme =

Canadian politician (1916–1995)

George Kenneth Wolstenholme (September 7, 1916 – November 16, 1995) is a former provincial level politician from Alberta, Canada. He served as a member of the Alberta Legislature from 1975 until 1982.

== Political career ==
Wolstenholme began his political career in 1974. He ran for the Alberta Progressive Conservative nomination in the Highwood electoral district. He defeated Don Tannas to win the nomination for the 1975 Alberta general election. He ran in that election and defeated incumbent MLA Edward Benoit from the Social Credit and two other candidates by a comfortable margin. His win allowed the PCs to pick up the district and he earned his first term in the Legislative Assembly of Alberta. He was elected to his second term in the 1979 Alberta general election winning easily over three other candidates.

As part of his duties as MLA he opened the Davisburg Community Association Hall in Okotoks, Alberta and presented a plaque on January 26, 1980. He retired from public life at the dissolution of the Assembly in 1982. He died in 1995.

Legislative Assembly of Alberta
Preceded by Edward Benoit	MLA Highwood; 1975–1982	Succeeded by Harry Alger
