= George Hoadley (Alberta politician) =

Canadian politician

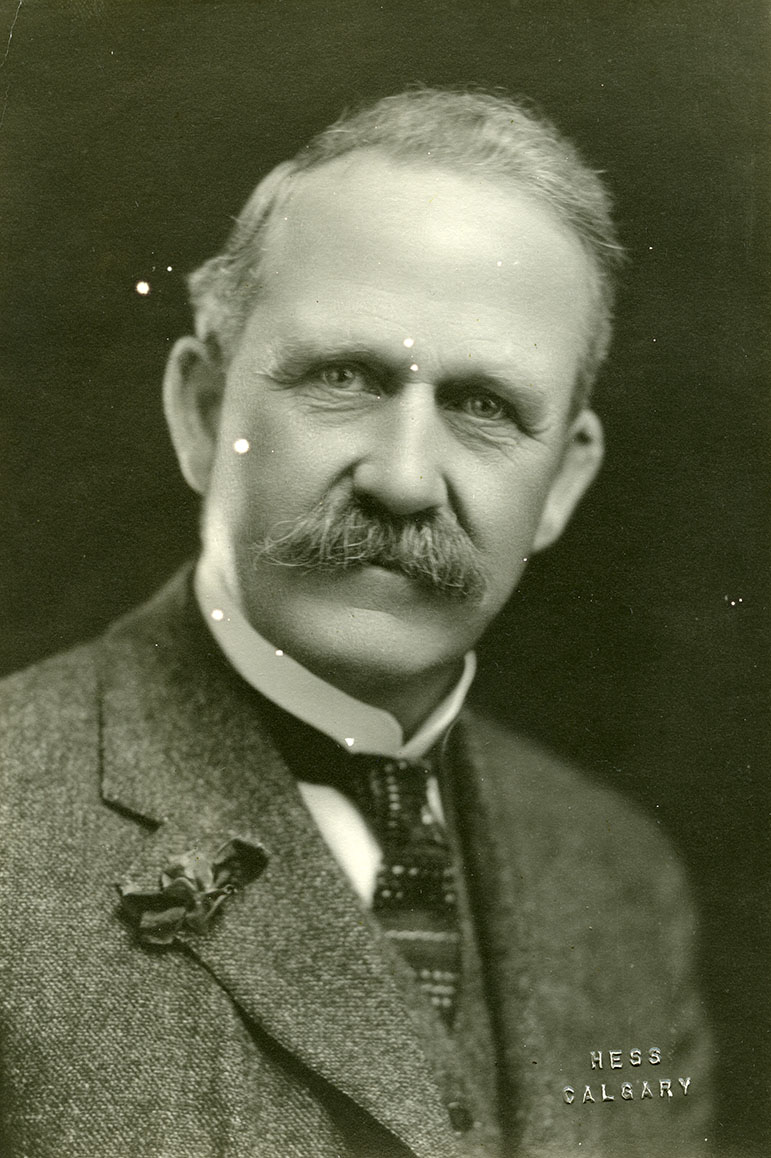

Leader of the Official Opposition in Alberta
- In office February 7, 1918 – April 17, 1919
- Preceded by: Edward Michener
- Succeeded by: James Ramsey

Member of the Legislative Assembly of Alberta
- In office 1909–1930
- Constituency: Okotoks
- In office 1930–1935
- Succeeded by: William Morrison
- Constituency: Okotoks-High River

Personal details
- Born: May 16, 1867 Abbey, England
- Died: December 14, 1955 (aged 88) Victoria, British Columbia, Canada
- Party: United Farmers of Alberta (1921-1935)
- Other political affiliations: Conservative (1909–1921); Opposition Left (Feb-July 1921)

George Hoadley (May 16, 1867 – December 14, 1955) was a long serving popular provincial politician and rancher from Alberta, Canada. Hoadley served a legendary career in the Alberta legislature during the early years when he led the Alberta Conservative Party in opposition. His effect in shaping policy in the province is widely remembered to this day as he served a broad range of portfolios in the United Farmers government that held power from 1921 to 1935. He held the Okotoks seat, then its successor seat (Okotoks-High River), for 26 years until the defeat of the UFA government in 1935.

== Early political career ==
Hoadley was born at Abbey, England and came to Canada in 1890. Hoadley first ran for public office in the 1902 Northwest Territories general election. He was defeated in the High River electoral district by Richard Wallace

Hoadley ran again for a seat in the Alberta Legislature seven years later. He won his seat in 1909 Alberta general election in the newly created electoral district of Okotoks. Hoadley won a hotly contested and very close election against Liberal candidate M. McHardy. He served his first term in the Legislative Assembly in the opposition Conservative caucus.

Hoadley sought a second term in office standing for re-election in the 1913 Alberta general election. He retained his seat, increasing his margin of victory.

Hoadley was re-elected to a third term in office again with increased plurality in the 1917 Alberta general election. His third term saw him assume the reins as the Conservative Party leader and become Leader of the Official Opposition.

== Opposition leader ==
Hoadley having been one of the most senior Conservative MLAs led the Alberta Conservative Party and became leader of His Majesty's Loyal Opposition in Alberta for three years. He took over the party's leadership from Edward Michener in 1917 after Michener resigned from the Legislature to take a seat in the Senate of Canada.

Hoadey was stripped of his leadership of the Conservatives at a caucus meeting in 1920. Members of the Conservative caucus decided James Ramsey should temporarily be the new leader.

== United Farmers ==
Hoadley switched party affiliations in 1921 after being removed as leader of the Conservatives. He crossed the floor to the unproven United Farmers of Alberta political party. He was acclaimed at a nomination meeting as the Okotoks candidate on July 9, 1921.

Hoadley stood re-election in his Okotoks district for the 1921 Alberta general election under the United Farmer banner. He was re-elected with a landslide, taking about 74% of the popular vote. The switch in parties had worked to his favor and he was the only member from the Conservative caucus that had kept his seat in that election..

Hoadley's prior years of experience in the legislature made him a very valuable asset to the new government and he was sworn into his first cabinet post. Hoadley was given the Minister of Agriculture portfolio in the new United Farmers government by Premier Herbert Greenfield. He was re-elected by acclamation in a Ministerial By-election in December 1921.

Hoadley's Okotoks electoral district was abolished prior to the 1930 Alberta general election to form the Okotoks—High River electoral district, along with the northern portion of the High River electoral district, and a small portion of the Rocky Mountain electoral district. Hoadley contested, and won a decisive victory in the new district against Liberal candidate Malcolm MacGougan, who had served as mayor of Okotoks from 1928 to 1929.

Hoadley served as Minister of Agriculture (1921-1934), Minister of Public Health (1923-1935), Provincial Secretary (1925-1926), and Minister of Railways and Telephones (1935-1936) during the 15 years of the UFA government.

== Sexual sterilization ==
Hoadley was one of the primary architects behind the Sexual Sterilization Act one of the most controversial pieces of legislation in Alberta history.

== Defeat ==
With the United Farmers of Alberta sagging in popular support in the midst of the Great Depression, Hoadley attempted to run for a record 7th term in office. The returns of the 1935 Alberta general election had him defeated by a landslide. The Social Credit candidate William Morrison led over Hoadley, his nearest competitor, by more than 2000 votes. Hoadley came in a distant second place in the standings out of four candidates. His career of a record 26-consecutive years in the legislature came to an end.

Hoadley served as an elected member of the executive for the Western Livestock Union. He died in 1955 in Victoria, British Columbia.

The hamlet of Hoadley, Alberta was named in his honor. In addition to the town the Hoadley Post Office in Haverigg, Alberta was also renamed in his honor in 1924.

Legislative Assembly of Alberta
| Preceded by New District | MLA Okotoks; 1909–1930 | Succeeded by District Abolished |
| Preceded by New District | MLA Okotoks-High River; 1930–1935 | Succeeded by William Morrison |
| Preceded by Edward Michener | Leader of the Official Opposition in Alberta; 1918–1919 | Succeeded by James Ramsey |
