= Ivan Casey =

Canadian politician

Member of the Legislative Assembly of Alberta
- In office 1944–1955
- Preceded by: John Broomfield
- Succeeded by: Ross Ellis
- Constituency: Okotoks-High River

Personal details
- Born: February 14, 1901 Iowa, United States
- Died: May 31, 1976 (aged 75) Alberta, Canada
- Party: Social Credit

Ivan Casey (February 14, 1901 – May 31, 1976) was a provincial politician from Alberta, Canada. He served as a member of the Legislative Assembly of Alberta from 1944 to 1955, sitting with the Social Credit caucus in government.
