= Okotoks (provincial electoral district) =

Defunct provincial electoral district in Alberta, Canada

Coordinates: 50°43′33″N 113°58′27″W

Alberta electoral district

Defunct provincial electoral district
- Legislature: Legislative Assembly of Alberta
- District created: 1909
- District abolished: 1930
- First contested: 1909
- Last contested: 1926

Okotoks was a provincial electoral district in Alberta, Canada, mandated to return a single member to the Legislative Assembly of Alberta from 1909 to 1930. The electoral district was named after the town of Okotoks.

== Okotoks history ==
=== Boundary history ===
Okotoks 1909 boundaries
Bordering districts
North	East	West	South
Calgary, Cochrane	Gleichen, Lethbridge	Rocky Mountain	High River
Legal description from the Statutes of Alberta 1909, An Act respecting the Legislative Assembly of Alberta.
riding map goes here		map in relation to other districts in rural Alberta goes here	
Okotoks.—Commencing at the intersection of the meridian line between ranges 24 and 25, west of the 4th meridian with the Bow River; thence westerly up stream following the said Bow River to the easterly limits of the City of Calgary as incorporated; thence southerly, westerly and northerly following the said limits of Calgary as incorporated to the intersection of the Bow River with the western limit of the said City of Calgary; thence up stream along the said Bow River to its intersection with the meridian line between ranges 2 and 3 west of the 5th meridian; thence south along the said meridian line between ranges 2 and 3, west of the 5th meridian to the north-east corner of township 24, range 3, west of the 5th meridian; thence west along the north boundary of the 24th townships to the south-easterly boundary of the Stony Indian Reserve; thence south-westerly along the said boundary of the said Indian Reserve to the meridian line between ranges 7 and 8, west of the 5th meridian; thence south along the said meridian line to the north boundary of the 22nd townships; thence east along the north boundary of the 22nd townships to the north-east corner of township 22, range 5, west of the 5th meridian; thence south on the meridian line between ranges 4 and 5 to the north boundary of the 19th townships; thence east along the north boundary of the said 19th townships to the north-east corner of township 19, range 25, west of the 4th meridian; thence north along the meridian line between ranges 24 and 25, west of the 4th meridian to the point of commencement.
Note: Boundaries came into force in 1909.

Okotoks 1913 boundaries
Bordering districts
North	East	West	South
Cochrane, North Calgary, South Calgary	Gleichen	Rocky Mountain	High River
Legal description from the Statutes of Alberta 1913, An Act to amend the Act respecting the Legislative Assembly of Alberta.
riding map goes here		map in relation to other districts in rural Alberta goes here	
Okotoks.—Commencing at the intersection of the meridian line between ranges 24 and 25, west of the 4th meridian and the Bow River; thence westerly up stream along Bow River to the point of its intersection with the south boundary of section 36, township 23, range 1, west of the 5th meridian; thence west along the south boundary of sections, 36, 35, 34, 33, 32, and 31, in township 23, range 1, west of the 5th meridian to the south-west corner of section 31, township 23, range 1, west of the 5th meridian; thence north along meridian line between ranges 1 and 2, west of the 5th meridian, to the north boundary of the 23rd townships; thence west along said north boundary of the 23rd townships to the north-east corner of township 23, range 5, west of the 5th meridian; thence south along meridian line between ranges 4 and 5, west of the 5th meridian, to the north-east corner of township 19, range 5, west of the 5th meridian; thence east along north boundary of the 19th townships to the north-east corner of township 19, range 25, west of the 4th meridian; thence north along meridian line between ranges 24 and 25, west of the 4th meridian to the point of commencement.
Note: Boundaries came into force in 1913.

Okotoks 1921 boundaries
Bordering districts
North	East	West	South
Cochrane, Calgary	Gleichen	Rocky Mountain	High River
Legal description from the Statutes of Alberta 1921, An Act to Amend The Motor Vehicle Act, The Unearned Increment Tax Act, and Certain other Acts and Ordinances.
riding map goes here		map in relation to other districts in rural Alberta goes here	
Note: Boundaries description unchanged from 1913, surrounding districts changed.

Okotoks 1926 boundaries
Bordering districts
North	East	West	South
Cochrane, Calgary	Gleichen	Rocky Mountain	High River
Legal description from the Statutes of Alberta 1926, An Act to amend the Act respecting the Legislative Assembly of Alberta.
riding map goes here		map in relation to other districts in rural Alberta goes here	
Okotoks.—Commencing at the point of intersection of the meridian line between ranges 24 and 25, west of the 4th meridian with the Bow River; thence westerly and north-westerly up stream along Bow River to the point of its intersection with the north boundary of section 23, township 23, range 1, west of the 5th meridian; thence west along the north boundaries of sections 23, 22, 21, and 20, in township 23, range 1, west of the 5th meridian, to the point of intersection of the north boundary of section 20, township 23, range 1, west of the 5th meridian with the Elbow River; thence north-westerly and up stream along the Elbow River to the point of its intersection with the north boundary of the 23rd townships; thence west along the north boundary of the 23rd townships to the north-east corner of township 23, range 5, west of the 5th meridian; thence south along the meridian line between ranges 4 and 5, west of the 5th meridian to the north-east corner of township 19, range 5, west of the 5th meridian; thence east along the north boundary of the 19th townships to the north-east corner of township 19 range 25, west of the 4th meridian; thence north along the meridian line between ranges 24 and 25, west of the 4th meridian to the point of commencement.
Note: Boundaries came into force in 1926 and lasted until the district was abolished.

Members of the Legislative Assembly for Okotoks
Assembly	Years	Member	Party
See High River electoral districts from 1905-1909
2nd	1909-1913	George Hoadley	Conservative
3rd	1913-1917	George Hoadley	Conservative
4th	1917-1920	George Hoadley	Conservative
4th	1920-1921	George Hoadley	Independent Farmer
4th	1921	George Hoadley	United Farmers
5th	1921-1926	George Hoadley	United Farmers
6th	1926-1930	George Hoadley	United Farmers
See Okotoks-High River electoral district from 1930-1971

=== Electoral history overview ===
The Okotoks electoral district was served by a single representative through its entire history. George Hoadley was elected to the Legislative Assembly in the first election held in the district in 1909, and re-elected six times. Hoadley gained prominence when he became leader of the Conservative Party after Edward Michener resigned the leadership in 1917 and held it until 1920 when he crossed the floor to the United Farmers of Alberta.

Hoadley won re-election to the Okotoks seat as a member of the United Farmers and became Minister of Agriculture when they formed government after the 1921 election. He was confirmed to the post by acclamation in a ministerial by-election held in 1921.

From 1924 to 1930, the district used instant-runoff voting to elect its MLA.

The electoral district was abolished in 1930 when it was merged with High River to become Okotoks-High River.

== Election results ==
=== 1909 ===
1909 Alberta general election
Party	Candidate	Votes	%	±%
Conservative	George Hoadley	524	56.28%	–
Liberal	M. McHardy	407	43.72%	–
Total		931	–	–
Rejected, spoiled and declined		N/A	–	–
Eligible electors / turnout		N/A	N/A	–
Conservative pickup new district.				
Source(s) Source: "Okotoks Official Results 1909 Alberta general election". Alberta Heritage Community Foundation.

=== 1913 ===
1913 Alberta general election
Party	Candidate	Votes	%	±%
Conservative	George Hoadley	594	60.99%	4.70%
Liberal	John A. Turner	380	39.01%	-4.70%
Total		974	–	–
Rejected, spoiled and declined		N/A	–	–
Eligible electors / turnout		N/A	N/A	–
Conservative hold		Swing		4.70%
Source(s) Source: "Okotoks Official Results 1913 Alberta general election". Alberta Heritage Community Foundation.

=== 1917 ===
1917 Alberta general election
Party	Candidate	Votes	%	±%
Conservative	George Hoadley	786	59.50%	-1.49%
Liberal	Angus McIntosh	535	40.50%	1.49%
Total		1,321	–	–
Rejected, spoiled and declined		N/A	–	–
Eligible electors / turnout		1,770	74.63%	–
Conservative hold		Swing		-1.49%
Source(s) Source: "Okotoks Official Results 1917 Alberta general election". Alberta Heritage Community Foundation.

=== 1921 ===
1921 Alberta general election
Party	Candidate	Votes	%	±%
United Farmers	George Hoadley	1,129	74.33%	14.82%
Liberal	Ernest A. Daggett	390	25.67%	-14.82%
Total		1,519	–	–
Rejected, spoiled and declined		N/A	–	–
Eligible electors / turnout		N/A	N/A	–
United Farmers hold		Swing		14.82%
Source(s) Source: "Okotoks Official Results 1921 Alberta general election". Alberta Heritage Community Foundation.

=== 1921 by-election ===
Alberta provincial by-election, December 9, 1921 Ministerial by-election upon George Hoadley's appointment to Cabinet
Party	Candidate	Votes	%	±%
United Farmers	George Hoadley	Acclaimed	–	–
Total		N/A	–	–
Rejected, spoiled and declined		N/A	–	–
Eligible electors / turnout		N/A	N/A	–
United Farmers hold		Swing		–
Source(s) "By-elections". Elections Alberta.

=== 1926 ===
1926 Alberta general election
Party	Candidate	Votes	%	±%
United Farmers	George Hoadley	920	51.98%	-22.35%
Conservative	W. G. Birney	850	48.02%	–
Total		1,770	–	–
Rejected, spoiled and declined		55	–	–
Eligible electors / turnout		2,279	80.08%	–
United Farmers hold		Swing		-22.35%
Source(s) Source: "Okotoks Official Results 1926 Alberta general election". Alberta Heritage Community Foundation.

== See also ==
- List of Alberta provincial electoral districts
- Canadian provincial electoral districts
- Okotoks, a town in southern Alberta, Canada
