= RJ Sigurdson =

Canadian politician

The Honourable Richard Junior Sigurdson ECA MLA
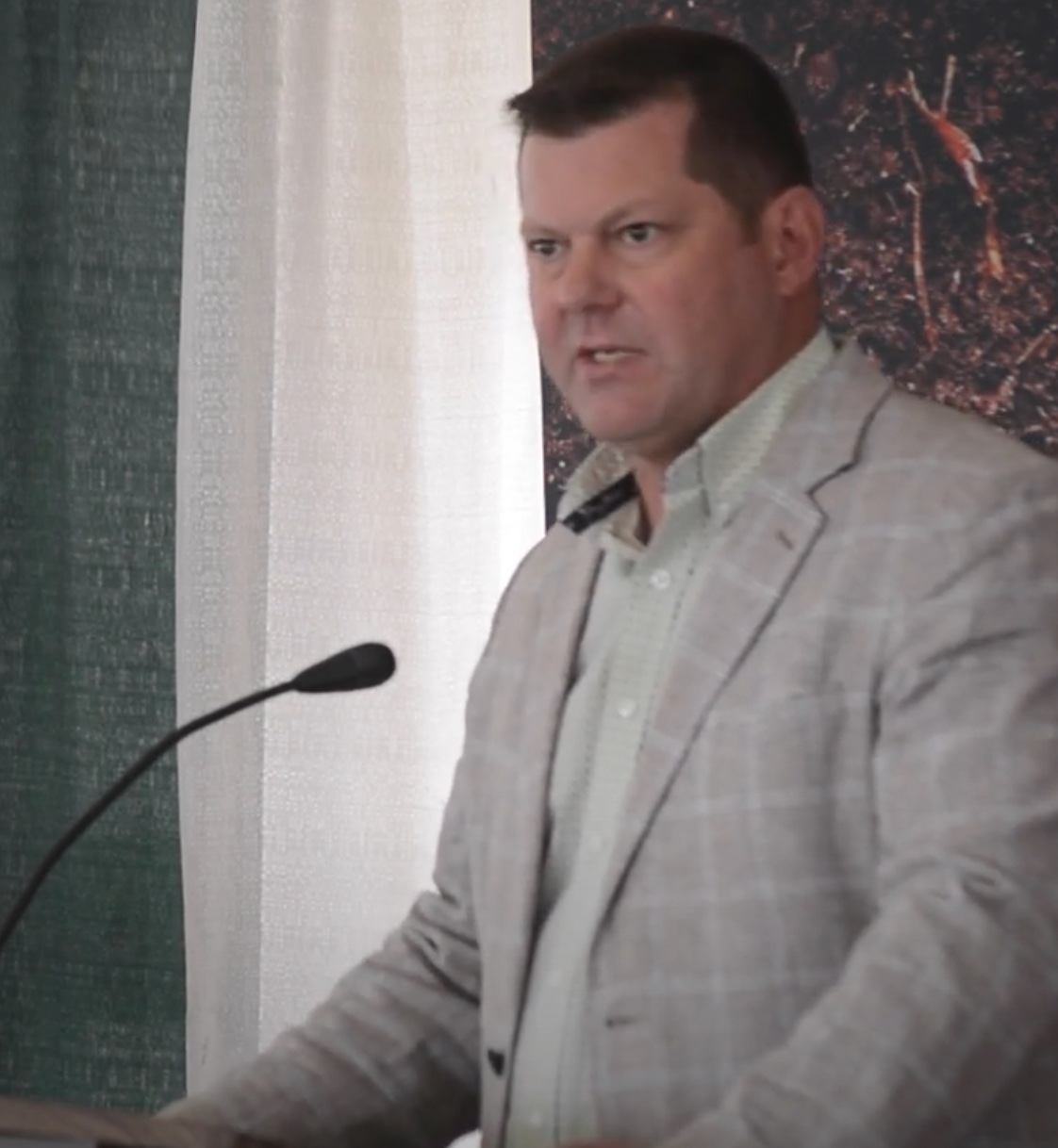
- RJ Sigurdson in 2024

Minister of Affordability and Utilities
- Incumbent
- Assumed office May 21, 2026
- Preceded by: Nathan Neudorf

Minister of Agriculture and Irrigation
- In office June 9, 2023 – May 21, 2026
- Preceded by: Nate Horner
- Succeeded by: Tara Sawyer

Member of the Legislative Assembly of Alberta for Highwood
- Incumbent
- Assumed office April 16, 2019
- Preceded by: Wayne Anderson

Personal details
- Party: United Conservative Party

Richard Junior (RJ) Sigurdson ECA MLA is a Canadian politician who has been the Alberta Minister of Affordability and Utilities since May 2026. He was previously Minister of Agriculture and Irrigation from June 2023 to May 2026. He was elected in the 2019 Alberta general election to represent the electoral district of Highwood in the 30th Alberta Legislature.

== Career ==
In February 2021, in an Okotoks Today article, Sigurdson said that he shared the concerns of his constituents regarding the June 2020 rescinding of the 1976 coal policy. Sigurdson supports "protecting the watershed of southern Alberta and the integrity of the eastern slopes of the Canadian Rockies."

In response to the Level 1 more stringent COVID-19 restrictions announced by Premier Jason Kenney on April 6, 2021, Sigurdson and 16 other UCP MLAs signed an open letter to the premier, calling on him to roll back the restrictions. All of the MLAs who cosigned the appeal represent ridings outside the two largest cities of Calgary and Edmonton.

A recall petition against Sigurdson was approved by Elections Alberta on November 14, 2025. Signature collection runs from November 25, 2025 to February 22, 2026, requiring 15,788 signatures.

== Electoral history ==
=== 2023 General Election ===
2023 Alberta general election: Highwood
Party	Candidate	Votes	%	±%
United Conservative	R.J. Sigurdson	17,990	68.90	-4.36
New Democratic	Jessica Hallam	7,540	28.88	+11.37
Wildrose Independence	Mike Lorusso	580	2.22	–
Total		26,110	99.22	–
Rejected and declined		204	0.78	
Turnout		26,314	67.31	
Eligible voters		39,093		
United Conservative hold		Swing		-7.86
Source(s) Source: Elections Alberta

=== 2019 General Election ===
2019 Alberta general election: Highwood
Party	Candidate	Votes	%	±%
United Conservative	R.J. Sigurdson	18,635	73.26%	-0.78%
New Democratic	Erik Overland	4,453	17.51%	-1.51%
Alberta Party	Ron Kerr	1,988	7.82%	3.51%
Alberta Independence	Dan Irving	362	1.42%	–
Total		25,438	–	–
Rejected, spoiled and declined		208	35	9
Eligible electors / turnout		35,422	72.43%	16.62%
United Conservative hold		Swing		23.83%
Source(s) Source: "65 - Highwood, 2019 Alberta general election". officialresults.elections.ab.ca. Elections Alberta. Alberta. Chief Electoral Officer (2019). 2019 General Election. A Report of the Chief Electoral Officer. Volume II (PDF) (Report). Vol. 2. Edmonton, Alta.: Elections Alberta. pp. 296–301. ISBN 978-1-988620-12-1.
