= Cory Morgan (blogger) =

Albertan politician

Leader of Independence Party of Alberta
- In office 2000–2001
- Succeeded by: Dave Bjorkman

Personal details
- Born: 1971 (age 54–55) Red Deer, Alberta, Canada
- Party: Independence Party of Alberta (2000–2001)
- Other political affiliations: Reform Party of Canada (1990s); Alberta Party (1999–2000); Separation Party of Alberta (2004); Alberta Alliance (2006); Wildrose Alliance Party of Alberta (2008); Libertarian Party of Canada (2015)
- Education: Southern Alberta Institute of Technology
- Occupation: Columnist, blogger, activist

Cory B. Morgan (born in 1971) is an Albertan separatist blogger, Alberta independence politician and activist, and columnist for the Western Standard. He was one of the founders of the Alberta Independence Party in 2000. He was also a founding member of the Wildrose Party.

== Biography ==
Morgan was born in Red Deer, Alberta, Canada, raised in Banff, Alberta, and later lived in Priddis, Alberta. He is a survey consultant in the field of energy exploration, particularly oil field surveying. He is also a blogger, with a focus on individual rights, particularly property rights. He is a Senior Alberta Columnist for the Western Standard.

In the 1990s, Morgan was an active member of the Reform Party of Canada.

From 1999 to 2000, he served as a director of the Alberta Party.

He was one of the founders of the Alberta Independence Party in 2000. In 2001, he ran as an independent candidate in the riding of Banff-Cochrane.

Following the dissolution of the AIP at the end of 2001, Morgan joined the Separation Party of Alberta. He was the SPA's candidate in Highwood in the provincial election of 2004. Morgan later joined the Alberta Alliance in 2006.

He was a founding member of the Wildrose Party. He served in the provincial executive positions of VP Policy and Southern zone director. He was a candidate for the Wildrose Alliance Party of Alberta, in the constituency of Calgary Mountain View in the Alberta general election of 2008, finishing in third place with 887 votes.

On November 6, 2011, Morgan drove his pickup truck into the Occupy Calgary camp at Olympic Plaza park. Morgan refused to leave his truck until police removed him, was fined $200 and towed. His purpose was part of a counter-protest against Occupy Calgary and a bid to highlight what he felt was unequal enforcement of city bylaws with respect to the Occupy camp and the public at large.

Morgan ran in the 2015 Canadian federal election as a Libertarian in Foothills, finishing in fifth-place with 424 votes.

Following the 2019 Canadian federal election, Morgan returned to his Western separatist roots, calling on his supporters to join him.

Morgan filmed footage of Siksika 146 without permission in 2025, uploading it to Youtube.com on March 16th of that year. Siksika Nation filed two $1000 CAD tickets against him for trespassing. This was the first time the Nation had utilized its own bylaws in charging an individual. The Alberta Court of Justice ruled it could not hear Morgan's challenge to the bylaw, and that it would have to be heard in federal court.

== Electoral history ==
2001 Alberta general election: Banff-Cochrane
Party	Candidate	Votes	%	±%
Progressive Conservative	Janis Tarchuk	9,418	70.2	9.1
Liberal	Norman Kent	2,147	16.0	-10.0
New Democratic	Cathy Harrop	1,311	9.8	3.4
Independent	Cory Morgan	538	4.0	–
Total		13,414	–	–
Rejected, spoiled and declined		51	–	–
Eligible electors / turnout		27,228	49.5	-0.4
Progressive Conservative hold		Swing		10.0
Source(s) Source: "Banff-Cochrane Official Results 2001 Alberta general election" (PDF). Elections Alberta.

2004 Alberta general election: Highwood
Party	Candidate	Votes	%	±%
Progressive Conservative	George Groeneveld	6,737	63.6%	−16.3%
Liberal	Lori Czerwinski	1,846	17.4%	5.4%
Alberta Alliance	Brian Wickhorst	731	6.9%	
Green	Sheelagh Matthews	547	5.2%	1.7%
New Democratic	Catherine Costen	433	4.1%	−0.6%
Separation	Cory Morgan	300	2.8%	
Total		10,594		
Rejected, spoiled and declined		81		
Eligible electors / turnout		23,519	45.4%	
Progressive Conservative hold		Swing		−10.9%
Source: "Highwood Statement of Official Results 2004 Alberta general election" (PDF). Elections Alberta.

2008 Alberta general election: Calgary-Mountain View
Party	Candidate	Votes	%	±%
Liberal	David Swann	7,086	51.5%	-1.8%
Progressive Conservative	Leah Lawrence	4,252	30.9%	0.5%
Wildrose Alliance	Cory Morgan	892	6.5%	2.1%
Green	Juliet Burgess	865	6.3%	-0.3%
New Democratic	John Donovan	661	4.8%	-0.5%
Total		13,756	–	–
Rejected, spoiled and declined		45	33	8
Eligible electors / turnout		33,311	41.5%	-8.1%
Liberal hold		Swing		-1.1%
Source(s) Source: Office of the Chief Electoral Officer (2008). The Report on the March 3, 2008 Provincial General Election of the Twenty-Seventh Legislative Assembly. Edmonton: Alberta Legislative Assembly. pp. 238–241. ISSN 1483-1171.

2015 Canadian federal election
Party	Candidate	Votes	%	±%	Expenditures
Conservative	John Barlow	46,166	75.7	-2.1	$66,508
Liberal	Tanya MacPherson	8,149	13.4	+9.8	$3,837
New Democratic	Alison Thompson	3,919	6.4	-3.7	$9,097
Green	Romy Tittel	1,983	3.3	-1.5	$16,307
Libertarian	Cory Morgan	424	0.7	–	–
Christian Heritage	Marc Slingerland	345	0.6	–	$9,192
Total valid votes/Expense limit		60,986	100		$237,098
Total rejected ballots		141	0.2	–	
Turnout		61,127	74.2	–	
Eligible voters		82,380			
Conservative hold		Swing		-6.0	
Source: Elections Canada
