= Harry Alger =

Canadian politician

MLA for Highwood
- In office 1982–1989
- Preceded by: George Wolstenholme
- Succeeded by: Don Tannas

Personal details
- Born: April 8, 1924 Prelate, Saskatchewan
- Died: January 27, 2010 (aged 85) Calgary, Alberta
- Party: Progressive Conservative
- Spouse: Norma
- Relations: Ross Alger (brother)
- Children: four
- Occupation: businessman

Harry Elliott Alger (April 8, 1924 – January 27, 2010) was a provincial level politician from Alberta, Canada. He served as a Member of the Alberta Legislature from 1982 until 1989.

== Political career ==
Alger was first elected to the Legislative Assembly of Alberta in the 1982 Alberta general election. He defeated Western Canada Concept leader and Incumbent Gordon Kesler and four other candidates in a high-profile race to win his first term in office. He held the district for the Progressive Conservatives, succeeding fellow PC member George Wolstenholme in a safe district. Alger was re-elected to his second and final term in office with a greatly reduced plurality in the 1986 Alberta general election. He defeated five other candidates to win easily. He retired at dissolution of the Legislature in 1989. He died in 2010 at the age of 85.

Legislative Assembly of Alberta
Preceded by George Wolstenholme	MLA Highwood; 1982–1989	Succeeded by Don Tannas
