= George Groeneveld =

Canadian politician

The Honourable George Groeneveld ECA

MLA for Highwood
- In office November 22, 2004 – April 23, 2012
- Preceded by: Don Tannas
- Succeeded by: Danielle Smith

Minister of Agriculture and Rural Development in the Alberta government
- In office December 15, 2006 – January 15, 2010
- Preceded by: Doug Horner
- Succeeded by: Jack Hayden

Personal details
- Born: 1940 or 1941 (age 85–86) Blackie, Alberta
- Party: Progressive Conservative
- Spouse: Judith
- Occupation: Politician

George Groeneveld ECA (born October 31, 1940) is a Canadian politician and was a Member of the Legislative Assembly of Alberta representing the constituency of Highwood as a Progressive Conservative.

== Early life ==
Groeneveld was born in Blackie, Alberta. He served as regional director of the Alberta Wheat Pool. In this role, he attended the Canadian International Grains Institute. Groeneveld was Agricore United's first vice-president.

== Political career ==
Groeneveld first sought public office in the 2004 provincial election in the constituency of Highwood. In that election, he received 64% of the vote. In 2006, following the leadership race for the Progressive Conservative Association of Alberta, newly elected Premier Ed Stelmach appointed Groeneveld as Minister of Agriculture and Food. In the 2008 provincial election that followed, Groeneveld secured his position as MLA for Highwood with 65% of the vote. In March 2008, he was reappointed as Minister of Agriculture and Rural Development.

== Personal life ==
Groeneveld is married to Judith. The couple has four children together, Sandra, Brett, Tyler, and Marla. He is an active member of his community and Gladys United Church.

== Election results ==
2004 Alberta general election: Highwood
Party	Candidate	Votes	%	±%
Progressive Conservative	George Groeneveld	6,737	63.6%	−16.3%
Liberal	Lori Czerwinski	1,846	17.4%	5.4%
Alberta Alliance	Brian Wickhorst	731	6.9%	
Green	Sheelagh Matthews	547	5.2%	1.7%
New Democratic	Catherine Costen	433	4.1%	−0.6%
Separation	Cory Morgan	300	2.8%	
Total		10,594		
Rejected, spoiled and declined		81		
Eligible electors / turnout		23,519	45.4%	
Progressive Conservative hold		Swing		−10.9%
Source: "Highwood Statement of Official Results 2004 Alberta general election" (PDF). Elections Alberta.

2008 Alberta general election results ( Highwood )		Turnout 42.7%	
Affiliation	Candidate	Votes	%
Progressive Conservative	George Groeneveld	7,716	65%
Liberal	Stan Shedd	1,647	14%
Green	John Barrett	690	6%
New Democratic	Carolyn Boulton	392	3%
Wildrose Alliance	Daniel W. Doherty	1,405	12%
