= Wayne Anderson (politician) =

Canadian politician

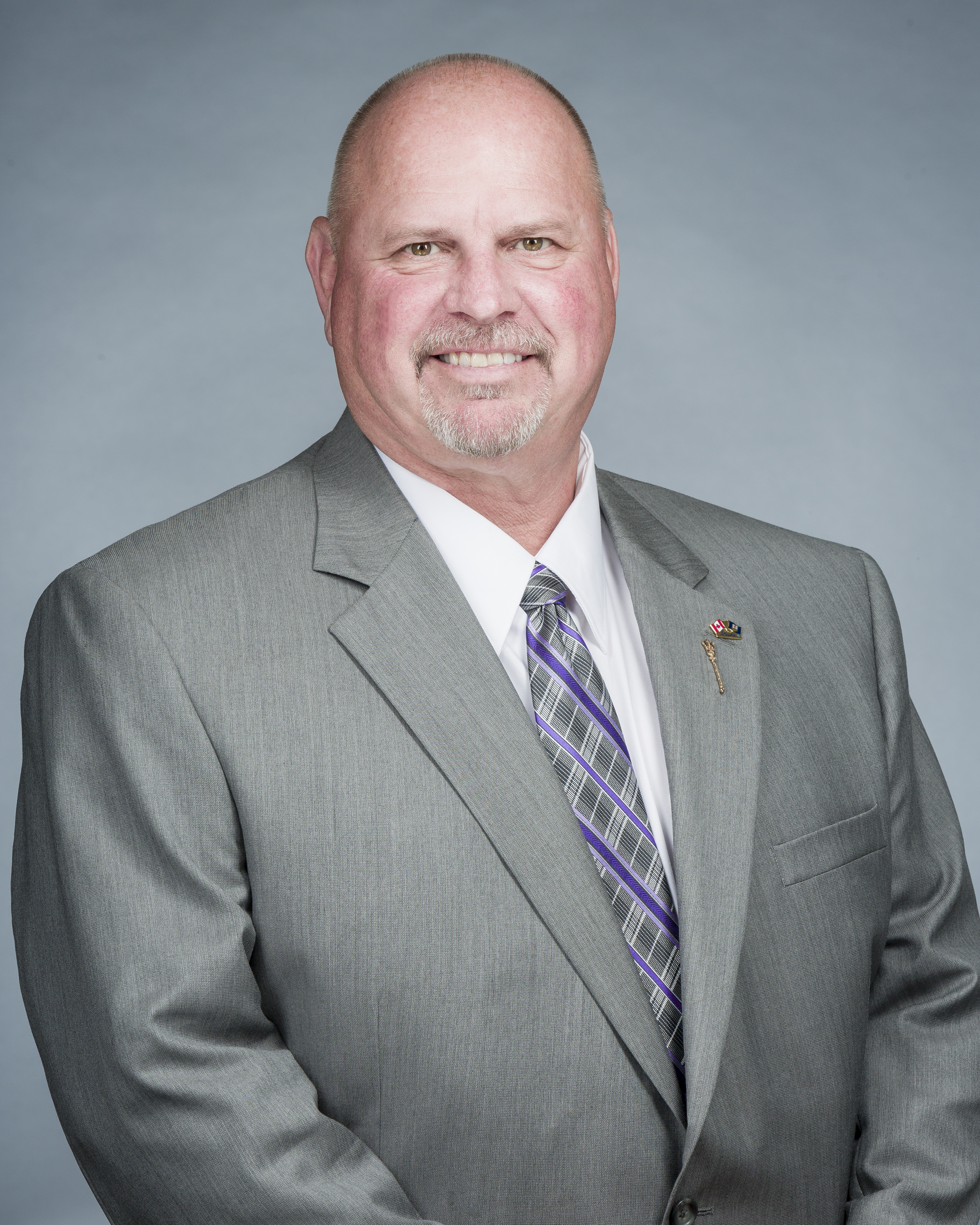

Member of the Legislative Assembly of Alberta for Highwood
- In office May 5, 2015 – April 16, 2019
- Preceded by: Danielle Smith
- Succeeded by: RJ Sigurdson

Personal details
- Born: 1953 or 1954 (age 72–73) Winnipeg, Manitoba
- Party: United Conservative
- Other political affiliations: Wildrose (2015–17)
- Occupation: Information Technology

Andrew Wayne Anderson (born 1953) is a Canadian politician who was elected in the 2015 Alberta general election to the Legislative Assembly of Alberta representing the electoral district of Highwood.

Highwood had previously been held by Danielle Smith, the leader of the Wildrose before her defection to the Progressive Conservatives in December 2014. Smith was defeated for the PC nomination by Okotoks councillor Carrie Fischer, who was defeated in the general election by Anderson.

Anderson was defeated in his UCP nomination race in 2018 to RJ Sigurdson.

== Electoral history ==
2015 Alberta general election: Highwood
Party	Candidate	Votes	%
Wildrose	Wayne Anderson	8,508	41.1%
Progressive Conservative	Carrie Fischer	6,825	33.0%
New Democratic	Leslie Mahoney	3,937	19.0%
Alberta Party	Joel Windsor	892	4.3%
Green	Martin Blake	360	1.7%
Social Credit	Jeremy Fraser	187	0.9%

2012 Alberta general election: Calgary-Hays
Party	Candidate	Votes	%	±%
Progressive Conservative	Ric McIver	8,621	55.09	+0.86
Wildrose	Wayne Anderson	5,670	36.23	+25.60
Liberal	Brian MacPhee	898	5.74	-22.17
New Democratic	Regina Vergara	461	2.95	+0.10
Total		15,650		
Rejected, spoiled and declined				
Eligible electors / Turnout			%	
Progressive Conservative hold		Swing		-12.37
