= John Broomfield =

Politician from Alberta, Canada

Member of the Legislative Assembly of Alberta
- In office 1940–1944
- Preceded by: William Aberhart
- Succeeded by: Ivan Casey
- Constituency: Okotoks-High River

Personal details
- Born: October 9, 1889
- Died: August 3, 1981 (aged 91) Alberta, Canada
- Party: None (Independent)

John Thomas Broomfield (October 9, 1889 – August 3, 1981) was a provincial politician from Alberta, Canada. He served as a member of the Legislative Assembly of Alberta from 1940 to 1944, sitting as an Independent member from the constituency of Okotoks-High River.
