= Highwood (electoral district) =

Provincial electoral district in Alberta, Canada

Alberta electoral district
- Highwood within the Calgary Metropolitan Region, 2017 boundaries.

Provincial electoral district
- Legislature: Legislative Assembly of Alberta
MLA
RJ Sigurdson
United Conservative
- District created: 1979
- First contested: 1971
- Last contested: 2023

Demographics
- Census division: Division No. 6
- Census subdivision(s): Diamond Valley, Foothills County, Okotoks

Highwood is a provincial electoral district in southern Alberta, Canada. The district is one of 87 in the province mandated to return a single member to the Legislative Assembly of Alberta using the first past the post method of voting. The district was created in the 1971 boundary redistribution out of the old Okotoks-High River riding and the North part of Pincher Creek-Crowsnest. The district has favoured right leaning parties since its creation. Progressive Conservative Association of Alberta candidates held the district from 1975 until 2012 when they were unseated by the Wildrose Party.

The current representative is RJ Sigurdson, who was first elected in 2019.

== History ==
The electoral district of Highwood was created in the 1971 boundary redistribution from the old electoral districts of Okotoks-High River and Pincher Creek-Crowsnest.

The 2010 boundary redistribution saw the riding cut down in size. Land south of the town of High River and a portion of land in the northwest of the constituency was transferred to the Livingstone-Macleod riding. A portion of land in the north east was also transferred to the Little Bow riding. The boundary commission had intended to rename Highwood to bring back the Okotoks-High River name but it was quashed in an amendment to the redistribution bill in the Legislative Assembly.

The 2017 redistribution saw more of Highwood transferred to Livingstone-Macleod, this time the entire community of High River. However, the riding expanded westward, now including the town of Black Diamond. The Boundaries Commission renamed the riding Okotoks-Sheep River in their final report, but the Legislative Assembly again chose to retain the name Highwood.

=== Boundary history ===
58 Highwood 2003 boundaries
Bordering districts
| North | East | West | South |
|---|---|---|---|
| Airdrie-Chestermere, Calgary-Hays, Calgary-Shaw, Foothills-Rocky View and Strathmore-Brooks | Little Bow | Banff-Cochrane | Livingstone-Macleod |
| riding map goes here | | | |
Legal description from the Statutes of Alberta 2003, Electoral Divisions Act.
Starting at the intersection of the centre line of Highway 2 and the south Calgary city boundary; then 1. east along the Calgary city boundary to the southerly extension of 88 Street SE; 2. south along the extension of 88 Street SE to the right bank of the Bow River; 3. downstream along the right bank of the Bow River to the east boundary of Sec. 23 in Twp. 21, Rge. 26 W4; 4. south along the east boundary of Secs. 23, 14, 11 and 2 in the Twp. and the east boundary of Secs. 35, 26, 23, 14, 11 and 2 in Twps. 20 and 19, Rge. 26 W4 to the north boundary of Twp. 18 (Highway 23); 5. west along the north boundary of Twp. 18 (Highway 23) to the east boundary of Sec. 35 in Twp. 18, Rge. 27 W4; 6. south along the east boundary of Secs. 35, 26, 23, 14, 11 and 2 in the Twp. and the east boundary of Secs. 35, 26 and 23 in Twp. 17, Rge. 27 W4 to the right bank of the Little Bow River; 7. downstream along the right bank of the Little Bow River to the north boundary of Sec. 6 in Twp. 17, Rge. 26 W4; 8. west along the north boundary of Sec. 6 in Twp. 17, Rge. 26 and the north boundary of Secs. 1, 2, 3, 4, 5 and 6 in Rge. 27 and the north boundary of Secs. 1, 2, 3, 4 and 5 to the east boundary of Sec. 6 in Rge. 28 W4; 9. south along the east boundary of Sec. 6 in Twp. 17, Rge. 28 W4 to the north boundary of Twp. 16; 10. west along the north boundary of Twp. 16 to the east boundary of Sec. 33, Rge. 2 W5; 11. south along the east boundary of Secs. 33, 28, 21, 16, 9 and 4 in the Twp. to the north boundary of Twp. 15; 12. west along the north boundary to the east boundary of the Rocky Mountain Forest Reserve; 13. in a northerly direction to the intersection with Highway 546 in Sec. 26, Twp. 19, Rge. 4 W5; 14. northeast along Highway 546 to the north boundary of Twp. 19, Rge. 3 W5; 15. east along the north boundary to the east boundary of Sec. 35; 16. south along the east boundary of Secs. 35 and 26 to the north boundary of Sec. 24; 17. east along the north boundary of Sec. 24 in the Twp. and Secs. 19, 20 and 21 in Rge. 2 W5 to the east boundary of Sec. 28 in the Twp.; 18. north along the east boundary of Secs. 28 and 33 in the Twp. and Secs. 4 and 9 in Twp. 20, Rge. 2 W5 to Highway 7; 19. north and east along Highway 7 to the east boundary of Sec. 23, Twp. 20, Rge. 1 W5; 20. north along the east boundary of Secs. 23, 26 and 35 in the Twp. and the east boundary of Sec. 2 in Twp. 21, Rge. 1 W5 to the north boundary of Sec. 1; 21. east along the north boundary of Sec. 1 in Twp. 21, Rge. 1 W5 and Sec. 5 in Twp. 21, Rge. 29 W4 to Highway 2A; 22. north along Highway 2A to the centre line of Highway 2; 23. northwest along Highway 2 to the starting point.
Note:

63 Highwood 2010 boundaries
Bordering districts
| North | East | West | South |
|---|---|---|---|
| Calgary-Lougheed, Calgary-South East and Chestermere-Rocky View | Little Bow | Livingstone-Macleod | Livingstone-Macleod |
Legal description from the Statutes of Alberta 2010, Electoral Divisions Act.

=== Representation history ===
Highwood
| Assembly | Years | Member | Party |
|---|---|---|---|
Riding created from Okotoks-High River and Pincher Creek-Crowsnest
| 17th | 1971–1975 | Edward Benoit | Social Credit |
| 18th | 1975–1979 | George Wolstenholme | Progressive Conservative |
| 19th | 1979–1982 | George Wolstenholme | Progressive Conservative |
| 20th | 1982–1986 | Harry Alger | Progressive Conservative |
| 21st | 1986–1989 | Harry Alger | Progressive Conservative |
| 22nd | 1989–1993 | Don Tannas | Progressive Conservative |
| 23rd | 1993–1997 | Don Tannas | Progressive Conservative |
| 24th | 1997–2001 | Don Tannas | Progressive Conservative |
| 25th | 2001–2004 | Don Tannas | Progressive Conservative |
| 26th | 2004–2008 | George Groeneveld | Progressive Conservative |
| 27th | 2008–2012 | George Groeneveld | Progressive Conservative |
| 28th | 2012–2014 | Danielle Smith | Wildrose |
| 28th | 2014–2015 | Danielle Smith | Progressive Conservative |
| 29th | 2015–2017 | Wayne Anderson | Wildrose |
| 29th | 2017–2019 | Wayne Anderson | United Conservative |
| 30th | 2019–2023 | RJ Sigurdson | United Conservative |
| 31st | 2023–Present | RJ Sigurdson | United Conservative |

The electoral district was created in the 1971 boundary redistribution. The first election held that year saw Okotoks-High River incumbent Social Credit MLA Edward Benoit win a very closely contested race to pick up the new seat for his party.

Benoit was defeated in the 1975 election by Progressive Conservative candidate George Wolstenholme. He was re-elected to his second term in the 1979 general election and retired at dissolution of the Legislature in 1982.

The 1982 election garnered great interest as incumbent Western Canada Concept MLA Gordon Kesler tried to win re-election here after winning a by-election is his former riding of Olds-Didsbury. Progressive Conservative candidate Harry Alger defeated Kesler in a landslide. Kesler had originally promised to move into the Olds-Didsbury riding after winning election and had reneged on that promise.

Alger won his second term in the 1986 general election defeating five other candidates. He retired from provincial politics at dissolution of the legislature in 1989. His replacement was Progressive Conservative candidate Don Tannas who won election for the first time that year.

Tannas won re-election three times in the 1993, 1997 and 2001 general elections with increasing majorities every time. He retired from provincial politics at dissolution of the legislature in 2004.

The 2004 general election saw Progressive Conservative candidate George Groeneveld elected MLA. He was appointed to cabinet in 2006 as the Minister of Agriculture by Premier Ed Stelmach. In the 2008 general election he won a landslide majority. In early 2010 Groeneveld was shuffled out of cabinet and returned to the back benches.

The 2012 general election saw the riding returned to opposition control for the first time since 1975 when Wildrose leader Danielle Smith won the open seat, winning her first term in office and becoming Leader of the Official Opposition. However, after Jim Prentice took control of the governing PCs, she and most of her caucus crossed the floor to his party in 2014.

Despite Smith's high profile, she failed to win the PC nomination to stand as the party's candidate in Highwood for the 2015 election. Wildrose re-gained the seat, with Wayne Anderson becoming the new MLA. He subsequently joined the United Conservative Party when the PCs and Wildrose decided to merge.

== Legislative election results ==
=== 2023 ===
2023 Alberta general election
| Party | Candidate | Votes | % | ±% |
|---|---|---|---|---|
| United Conservative | R.J. Sigurdson | 17,990 | 68.90 | -4.36 |
| New Democratic | Jessica Hallam | 7,540 | 28.88 | +11.37 |
| Wildrose Independence | Mike Lorusso | 580 | 2.22 | – |
| Total | | 26,110 | 99.22 | – |
| Rejected and declined | | 204 | 0.78 | |
| Turnout | | 26,314 | 67.31 | |
| Eligible voters | | 39,093 | | |
| United Conservative hold | | Swing | | -7.86 |
Source(s) Source: Elections Alberta

=== 2019 ===
2019 Alberta general election
| Party | Candidate | Votes | % | ±% |
|---|---|---|---|---|
| United Conservative | R.J. Sigurdson | 18,635 | 73.26% | -0.78% |
| New Democratic | Erik Overland | 4,453 | 17.51% | -1.51% |
| Alberta Party | Ron Kerr | 1,988 | 7.82% | 3.51% |
| Alberta Independence | Dan Irving | 362 | 1.42% | – |
| Total | | 25,438 | – | – |
| Rejected, spoiled and declined | | 208 | 35 | 9 |
| Eligible electors / turnout | | 35,422 | 72.43% | 16.62% |
| United Conservative hold | | Swing | | 23.83% |
Source(s) Source: "65 - Highwood, 2019 Alberta general election". officialresults.elections.ab.ca. Elections Alberta. Alberta. Chief Electoral Officer (2019). 2019 General Election. A Report of the Chief Electoral Officer. Volume II (PDF) (Report). Vol. 2. Edmonton, Alta.: Elections Alberta. pp. 296–301. ISBN 978-1-988620-12-1.

=== 2015 ===
2015 Alberta general election
| Party | Candidate | Votes | % | ±% |
|---|---|---|---|---|
| Wildrose | Wayne Anderson | 8,504 | 41.07% | -11.52% |
| Progressive Conservative | Carrie Fischer | 6,827 | 32.97% | -9.54% |
| New Democratic | Leslie Mahoney | 3,937 | 19.01% | 16.97% |
| Alberta Party | Joel Windsor | 892 | 4.31% | – |
| Green | Martin Blake | 360 | 1.74% | – |
| Social Credit | Jeremy Fraser | 187 | 0.90% | – |
| Total | | 20,707 | – | – |
| Rejected, spoiled and declined | | 61 | 23 | 15 |
| Eligible electors / turnout | | 37,239 | 55.81% | -3.14% |
| Wildrose hold | | Swing | | -0.99% |
Source(s) Source: "63 - Highwood, 2015 Alberta general election". officialresults.elections.ab.ca. Elections Alberta. Chief Electoral Officer (2016). 2015 General Election. A Report of the Chief Electoral Officer (PDF) (Report). Edmonton, Alta.: Elections Alberta.

=== 2012 ===
2012 Alberta general election
| Party | Candidate | Votes | % | ±% |
|---|---|---|---|---|
| Wildrose Alliance | Danielle Smith | 10,094 | 52.59% | 40.74% |
| Progressive Conservative | John Barlow | 8,159 | 42.51% | −22.60% |
| Liberal | Keegan Gibson | 547 | 2.85% | −11.05% |
| New Democratic | Miles Dato | 392 | 2.04% | −1.26% |
| Total | | 19,192 | – | – |
| Rejected, spoiled and declined | | 50 | 33 | 10 |
| Eligible electors / turnout | | 32,659 | 58.95% | 17.86% |
| Wildrose Alliance gain from Progressive Conservative | | Swing | | −20.56% |
Source(s) Source: "63 - Highwood, 2012 Alberta general election". officialresults.elections.ab.ca. Elections Alberta. Chief Electoral Officer (2012). The Report of the Chief Electoral Officer on the 2011 Provincial Enumeration and Monday, April 23, 2012 Provincial General Election of the Twenty-eighth Legislative Assembly (PDF) (Report). Edmonton, Alta.: Elections Alberta. pp. 378–382. Archived (PDF) from the original on May 6, 2021.

=== 2008 ===
2008 Alberta general election
| Party | Candidate | Votes | % | ±% |
|---|---|---|---|---|
| Progressive Conservative | George Groeneveld | 7,715 | 65.11% | 1.52% |
| Liberal | Stan Shedd | 1,647 | 13.90% | -3.53% |
| Wildrose Alliance | Daniel W. Doherty | 1,405 | 11.86% | 4.96% |
| Green | John Barrett | 691 | 5.83% | 0.67% |
| New Democratic | Carolyn Boulton | 391 | 3.30% | -0.79% |
| Total | | 11,849 | – | – |
| Rejected, spoiled and declined | | 32 | 10 | 2 |
| Eligible electors / turnout | | 28,922 | 41.09% | -4.06% |
| Progressive Conservative hold | | Swing | | 2.52% |
Source(s) Source: "58 - Highwood, 2008 Alberta general election". officialresults.elections.ab.ca. Elections Alberta. Chief Electoral Officer (2008). The Report on the March 3, 2008 Provincial General Election of the Twenty-Seventh Legislative Assembly (Report). Edmonton, Alta.: Elections Alberta. pp. 434–437.

=== 2004 ===
2004 Alberta general election
| Party | Candidate | Votes | % | ±% |
|---|---|---|---|---|
| Progressive Conservative | George Groeneveld | 6,737 | 63.59% | -16.29% |
| Liberal | Lori Czerwinski | 1,846 | 17.42% | 5.43% |
| Alberta Alliance | Brian Wickhorst | 731 | 6.90% | – |
| Green | Sheelagh Matthews | 547 | 5.16% | 1.68% |
| New Democratic | Catherine Whelan Costen | 433 | 4.09% | -0.55% |
| Separation | Cory Morgan | 300 | 2.83% | – |
| Total | | 10,594 | – | – |
| Rejected, spoiled and declined | | 25 | 56 | 0 |
| Eligible electors / turnout | | 23,519 | 45.15% | -10.92% |
| Progressive Conservative hold | | Swing | | -10.86% |
Source(s) Source: "00 - Highwood, 2004 Alberta general election". officialresults.elections.ab.ca. Elections Alberta. Alberta. Chief Electoral Officer (2005). Report of the Chief Electoral Officer on the General Enumeration and General Election of the Twenty-sixth Legislative Assembly (Report). Edmonton: Alberta Legislative Assembly, Office of the Chief Electoral Officer.

=== 2001 ===
2001 Alberta general election
| Party | Candidate | Votes | % | ±% |
|---|---|---|---|---|
| Progressive Conservative | Don Tannas | 13,321 | 79.89% | 9.93% |
| Liberal | Leonard Borowski | 2,000 | 11.99% | -2.24% |
| New Democratic | Gunhild Hoogensen | 773 | 4.64% | 0.30% |
| Greens | Julie Walker | 581 | 3.48% | – |
| Total | | 16,675 | – | – |
| Rejected, spoiled and declined | | 25 | 16 | 11 |
| Eligible electors / turnout | | 29,806 | 56.07% | -0.45% |
| Progressive Conservative hold | | Swing | | 6.09% |
Source(s) Source: "Highwood Official Results 2001 Alberta general election". Alberta Heritage Community Foundation. Alberta. Chief Electoral Officer (2001). The report of the Chief Electoral Officer on the 2000 provincial confirmation process and Monday, March 12, 2001, Provincial General Election of the twenty-fifth Legislative Assembly. Edmonton: Alberta Legislative Assembly, Office of the Chief Electoral Officer.

=== 1997 ===
1997 Alberta general election
| Party | Candidate | Votes | % | ±% |
|---|---|---|---|---|
| Progressive Conservative | Don Tannas | 9,551 | 69.96% | 5.07% |
| Liberal | Howard Paulsen | 1,944 | 14.24% | -11.18% |
| Social Credit | John Bergen | 1,566 | 11.47% | 5.83% |
| New Democratic | Hugh Logie | 592 | 4.34% | 0.28% |
| Total | | 13,653 | – | – |
| Rejected, spoiled and declined | | 35 | 24 | 3 |
| Eligible electors / turnout | | 24,225 | 56.52% | -8.43% |
| Progressive Conservative hold | | Swing | | 8.13% |
Source(s) Source: "Highwood Official Results 1997 Alberta general election". Alberta Heritage Community Foundation. Alberta. Chief Electoral Officer (1997). Report of the Chief Electoral Officer, November, 1996 general enumeration and Tuesday, March 11, 1997 general election Twenty-fourth Legislative Assembly. Edmonton: Alberta Legislative Assembly, Office of the Chief Electoral Officer.

=== 1993 ===
1993 Alberta general election
| Party | Candidate | Votes | % | ±% |
|---|---|---|---|---|
| Progressive Conservative | Don Tannas | 8,063 | 64.88% | 4.63% |
| Liberal | Rusti-Ann Blanke | 3,159 | 25.42% | 3.17% |
| Social Credit | John Bergen | 701 | 5.64% | – |
| New Democratic | Marg Elliot | 504 | 4.06% | -13.44% |
| Total | | 12,427 | – | – |
| Rejected, spoiled and declined | | 22 | – | – |
| Eligible electors / turnout | | 19,169 | 64.94% | 9.53% |
| Progressive Conservative hold | | Swing | | 0.73% |
Source(s) Source: "Highwood Official Results 1993 Alberta general election". Alberta Heritage Community Foundation.

=== 1989 ===
1989 Alberta general election
| Party | Candidate | Votes | % | ±% |
|---|---|---|---|---|
| Progressive Conservative | Don Tannas | 5,481 | 60.26 | -6.21 |
| Liberal | Don Dearle | 2,024 | 22.25 | – |
| New Democratic | Janis Belgum | 1,591 | 17.49 | +4.36 |
| Total | | 9,096 | 99.57 | – |
| Rejected, spoiled and declined | | 39 | 0.43 | +0.20 |
| Turnout | | 9,135 | 55.41 | +2.06 |
| Eligible voters | | 16,485 | | |
| Progressive Conservative hold | | Swing | | -14.23 |
Source(s) Source: "March 20 1989 (AB)". Canadian Election Database.

=== 1986 ===
1986 Alberta general election
| Party | Candidate | Votes | % | ±% |
|---|---|---|---|---|
| Progressive Conservative | Harry E. Alger | 5,336 | 66.47 | -3.61 |
| New Democratic | William C. McCutcheon | 1,054 | 13.13 | +8.96 |
| Representative | Murray Meszaros | 811 | 10.10 | – |
| Independent | Pam McIver | 633 | 7.88 | |
| Independent | Norman Kientz | 142 | 1.77 | |
| Independent | Bill Bohdan | 52 | 0.65 | |
| Total | | 8,028 | 99.78 | – |
| Rejected, spoiled and declined | | 18 | 0.22 | -0.04 |
| Turnout | | 8,046 | 53.36 | -23.75 |
| Eligible voters | | 15,080 | | |
| Progressive Conservative hold | | Swing | | -6.28 |
Source(s) Source: "May 08 1986 (AB)". Canadian Election Database.

=== 1982 ===
1982 Alberta general election
| Party | Candidate | Votes | % | ±% |
|---|---|---|---|---|
| Progressive Conservative | Harry E. Alger | 7,811 | 70.08% | 3.52% |
| Western Canada Concept | Gordon Kesler | 2,006 | 18.00% | – |
| New Democratic | William C. McCutcheon | 465 | 4.17% | 0.51% |
| Independent | R.L. Snell | 436 | 3.91% | – |
| Independent | Don Tanner | 245 | 2.20% | – |
| Alberta Reform Movement | Ronald G. Arkes | 183 | 1.64% | – |
| Total | | 11,146 | – | – |
| Rejected, spoiled and declined | | 30 | – | – |
| Eligible electors / turnout | | 14,495 | 77.10% | 11.25% |
| Progressive Conservative hold | | Swing | | 6.40% |
Source(s) Source: "Highwood Official Results 1982 Alberta general election". Alberta Heritage Community Foundation.

=== 1979 ===
1979 Alberta general election
| Party | Candidate | Votes | % | ±% |
|---|---|---|---|---|
| Progressive Conservative | George Wolstenholme | 5,103 | 66.56% | 2.69% |
| Social Credit | Don Dixon | 2,092 | 27.29% | -3.17% |
| New Democratic | William C. McCutcheon | 281 | 3.67% | -0.04% |
| Liberal | Joan Cowling | 191 | 2.49% | 0.51% |
| Total | | 7,667 | – | – |
| Rejected, spoiled and declined | | 24 | – | – |
| Eligible electors / turnout | | 11,680 | 65.85% | -3.27% |
| Progressive Conservative hold | | Swing | | 2.93% |
Source(s) Source: "Highwood Official Results 1979 Alberta general election". Alberta Heritage Community Foundation.

=== 1975 ===
1975 Alberta general election
| Party | Candidate | Votes | % | ±% |
|---|---|---|---|---|
| Progressive Conservative | George Wolstenholme | 4,037 | 63.87% | 18.29% |
| Social Credit | Edward P. Benoit | 1,925 | 30.45% | -17.61% |
| New Democratic | Muriel McCreary | 234 | 3.70% | -2.66% |
| Liberal | Melbe Cochlan | 125 | 1.98% | – |
| Total | | 6,321 | – | – |
| Rejected, spoiled and declined | | 22 | – | – |
| Eligible electors / turnout | | 9,177 | 69.12% | -8.52% |
| Progressive Conservative gain from Social Credit | | Swing | | 15.46% |
Source(s) Source: "Highwood Official Results 1975 Alberta general election". Alberta Heritage Community Foundation.

=== 1971 ===
1971 Alberta general election
| Party | Candidate | Votes | % | ±% |
|---|---|---|---|---|
| Social Credit | Edward P. Benoit | 2,941 | 48.06% | – |
| Progressive Conservative | Eldon C. Couey | 2,789 | 45.58% | – |
| New Democratic | D. Larry McKillop | 389 | 6.36% | – |
| Total | | 6,119 | – | – |
| Rejected, spoiled and declined | | 31 | – | – |
| Eligible electors / turnout | | 7,921 | 77.64% | – |
| Social Credit pickup new district. | | | | |
Source(s) Source: "Highwood Official Results 1971 Alberta general election". Alberta Heritage Community Foundation.

== Senate nominee election results ==
=== 2004 ===
| 2004 Senate nominee election results: Highwood | | | | Turnout 43.52% | |
| Affiliation | Candidate | Votes | % votes | % ballots | Rank |
| Progressive Conservative | Bert Brown | 5,568 | 19.25% | 61.73% | 1 |
| Progressive Conservative | Betty Unger | 4,045 | 13.99% | 44.85% | 2 |
| Progressive Conservative | Jim Silye | 3,807 | 13.17% | 42.21% | 5 |
| Progressive Conservative | Cliff Breitkreuz | 3,223 | 11.15% | 35.73% | 3 |
| Progressive Conservative | David Usherwood | 2,932 | 10.14% | 32.51% | 6 |
| Independent | Link Byfield | 2,566 | 8.87% | 28.45% | 4 |
| Alberta Alliance | Vance Gough | 2,046 | 7.08% | 22.68% | 8 |
| Alberta Alliance | Michael Roth | 1,722 | 5.95% | 19.09% | 7 |
| Alberta Alliance | Gary Horan | 1,621 | 5.61% | 17.97% | 10 |
| Independent | Tom Sindlinger | 1,388 | 4.79% | 15.39% | 9 |
| Total votes | | 28,918 | 100% | | |
| Total ballots | | 9,020 | 3.21 votes per ballot | | |
| Rejected, spoiled and declined | | 1,564 | | | |

Voters had the option of selecting four candidates on the ballot

== Student vote results ==
=== 2004 ===
Participating schools
Highwood High School
Foothills Composite High School
Red Deer Lake School
The Centre for Learning @Home

On November 19, 2004, a student vote was conducted at participating Alberta schools to parallel the 2004 Alberta general election results. The vote was designed to educate students and simulate the electoral process for persons who have not yet reached the legal majority. The vote was conducted in 80 of the 83 provincial electoral districts with students voting for actual election candidates. Schools with a large student body that reside in another electoral district had the option to vote for candidates outside of the electoral district then where they were physically located.

2004 Alberta student vote results
| Affiliation | Candidate | Votes | % |
| NDP | Catherine Whelan Costen | 133 | 29.36% |
| Progressive Conservative | George Groeneveld | 110 | 24.28% |
| Liberal | Lori Czerwinski | 78 | 17.22% |
| Alberta Alliance | Brian Wickhorst | 58 | 12.80% |
| Green | Sheelagh Matthews | 37 | 8.17% |
| Separation | Cory Morgan | 37 | 8.17% |
| Total | | 453 | 100% |
| Rejected, spoiled and declined | | 17 | |

=== 2012 ===
2012 Alberta student vote results
| Affiliation | Candidate | Votes | % |
| Progressive Conservative | John Barlow (Canadian politician) | 609 | 49.39% |
| Wildrose | Danielle Smith | 442 | 35.85% |
| Liberal | Keegan Gibson | 118 | 9.57% |
| NDP | Miles Dato | 64 | 5.19% |
| Total | | 1233 | 100% |

=== 2019 ===
Participating schools
Big Rock Elementary
Brant Christian School
C. Ian McLaren School
Calgary Girls' School
Dr. Morris Gibson School
École Secondaire Foothills Composite High/Alberta High School Of Fine Arts
Good Shepherd School
Heritage Heights School
Holy Trinity Academy
Oilfields High School
Red Deer Lake School
Spitzee Elementary School
St. Francis Of Assist Academy
St. Marys School
Strathcona-Tweedsmuir School
Summit West Independent School
Tanbridge Academy
Turner Valley
Westmount School
École Okotoks Junior High School
École Percy Pegler ELEMENTARY

More than 1,230 schools have reported their election results, representing all 87 electoral divisions in the province. In total, 165,527 ballots were cast by student participants. Of that, 2,895 votes were cast in the Highwood electoral district.

2019 Alberta student vote results
| Affiliation | Candidate | Votes | % |
| United Conservative | RJ Sigurdson | 1,606 | 55.47% |
| Alberta Party | Ron Kerr | 558 | 19.27% |
| NDP | Erik Overland | 496 | 17.13% |
| Independence Party of Alberta | Dan Irving | 235 | 8.12% |
| Total | | 2895 | 100% |

== See also ==
- List of Alberta provincial electoral districts
- Canadian provincial electoral districts
