= Okotoks-High River =

Defunct provincial electoral district in Alberta, Canada

Coordinates: 50.65°N 113.92°W

Alberta electoral district

Defunct provincial electoral district
- Legislature: Legislative Assembly of Alberta
- District created: 1930
- District abolished: 1971
- First contested: 1930
- Last contested: 1967

Okotoks-High River was a provincial electoral district in Alberta, Canada, mandated to return a single member to the Legislative Assembly of Alberta from 1930 to 1971.

== History ==
Okotoks-High River
Assembly	Years	Member	Party
Riding created from High River, Okotoks and Rocky Mountain
7th	1930–1935	George Hoadley	United Farmers
8th	1935–1935	William Morrison	Social Credit
8th	1935–1940	William Aberhart	Social Credit
9th	1940–1944	John T. Broomfield	Independent
10th	1944–1948	Ivan Casey	Social Credit
11th	1948–1952	Ivan Casey	Social Credit
12th	1952–1955	Ivan Casey	Social Credit
13th	1955–1959	Ross Laird Ellis	Liberal–Conservative
14th	1959–1963	Ernest George Hansell	Social Credit
15th	1963–1967	Edward P. Benoit	Social Credit
16th	1967–1971	Edward P. Benoit	Social Credit
Riding dissolved into Highwood

The Okotoks—High River electoral district was formed prior to the 1930 Alberta general election from the Okotoks electoral district, northern portion of the High River electoral district, and a small portion of the Rocky Mountain electoral district. The electoral district was named after the towns of Okotoks and High River.

From 1930 to 1956, the district used instant-runoff voting to elect its MLA.

The Okotoks-High River electoral district would be abolished in the 1971 electoral boundary re-distribution, and merge with the northern portion of the Pincher Creek-Crowsnest electoral district to form the Highwood electoral district.

=== Electoral history ===
The first member of the Legislative Assembly elected in the Okotoks-High River electoral district was United Farmers of Alberta representative George Hoadley, who had previously held the former Okotoks electoral district through its entire history from 1909 to 1930. Hoadley soundly defeated his Liberal opponent Malcolm MacGougan, who had been mayor of Okotoks from 1928 to 1929.

Hoadley would fail to hold the seat in the 1935 Alberta general election, falling to Social Credit candidate William Morrison. Morrison would defeat two other candidates, Liberal A. S. Dick and future Mayor of Okotoks and Conservative Victor E. Hessell. Morrison would only represent the district for a couple of weeks before resigning to provide a seat for newly confirmed party leader and Premier William Aberhart. Aberhart had convinced Morrison to resign so that he could take the seat and provide cabinet representation to southern Alberta to quell complaints about the lack of ministers for the region. Morrison's resignation occurred before the newly elected Legislative Assembly had its first sitting. Aberhart would only represent the district for one sitting, choosing to contest the 1940 Alberta general election in the Calgary electoral district.

== Election results ==
=== 1930 ===
1930 Alberta general election
Party	Candidate	Votes	%	±%
United Farmers	George Hoadley	2,834	62.95%	–
Liberal	Malcolm MacGougan	1,668	37.05%	–
Total		4,502	–	–
Rejected, spoiled and declined		238	–	–
Eligible electors / turnout		6,499	72.93%	–
United Farmers pickup new district.				
Source(s) Source: "Okotoks-High River Official Results 1930 Alberta general election". Alberta Heritage Community Foundation.

=== 1935 ===
1935 Alberta general election
Party	Candidate	Votes	%	±%
Social Credit	William Morrison	3,062	55.78%	–
United Farmers	George Hoadley	1,005	18.31%	-44.64%
Liberal	A. S. Dick	970	17.67%	-19.38%
Conservative	Victor E. Hessell	452	8.23%	–
Total		5,489	–	–
Rejected, spoiled and declined		165	–	–
Eligible electors / turnout		6,590	85.80%	12.86%
Social Credit gain from United Farmers		Swing		5.79%
Source(s) Source: "Okotoks-High River Official Results 1935 Alberta general election". Alberta Heritage Community Foundation.

=== 1935 by-election ===
Alberta provincial by-election, November 4, 1935 Upon the resignation of William Morrison to provide a seat for the Premier
Party	Candidate	Votes	%	±%
Social Credit	William Aberhart	Acclaimed	–	–
Total		N/A	–	–
Rejected, spoiled and declined		N/A	–	–
Eligible electors / turnout		N/A	N/A	–
Social Credit hold		Swing		N/A
Source(s) "Past By-Election results". Elections Alberta.

=== 1940 ===
1940 Alberta general election
Party	Candidate	Votes	%	±%
Independent	John T. Broomfield	4,352	57.80%	–
Social Credit	Ivan Casey	3,178	42.20%	-13.58%
Total		7,530	–	–
Rejected, spoiled and declined		268	–	–
Eligible electors / turnout		9,681	80.55%	-5.25%
Independent gain from Social Credit		Swing		-10.94%
Source(s) Source: "Okotoks-High River Official Results 1940 Alberta general election". Alberta Heritage Community Foundation.

=== 1944 ===
1944 Alberta general election
Party	Candidate	Votes 1st count	%	Votes final count	±%
Social Credit	Ivan Casey	2,932	44.61%	3,425	2.41%
Independent	John T. Broomfield	2,196	33.41%	2,347	-24.38%
Co-operative Commonwealth	J. A. Jeffery	1,444	21.97%	–	–
Total		6,572	–	–	–
Rejected, spoiled and declined		107	–	–	–
Eligible electors / turnout		9,854	67.78%	-12.77%	–
Social Credit gain from Independent		Swing		-2.20%	
Source(s) Source: "Okotoks-High River Official Results 1944 Alberta general election". Alberta Heritage Community Foundation. Instant-runoff voting requires a candidate to receive a plurality (greater than 50%) of the votes. As no candidate received a plurality of votes, the bottom candidate was eliminated and their 2nd place votes were applied to both other candidates until one received a plurality.

=== 1948 ===
1948 Alberta general election
Party	Candidate	Votes	%	±%
Social Credit	Ivan Casey	3,077	63.34%	18.73%
Liberal	Percy C. Dougherty	1,291	26.57%	–
Co-operative Commonwealth	Ellis W. Oviatt	490	10.09%	-11.89%
Total		4,858	–	–
Rejected, spoiled and declined		1,105	–	–
Eligible electors / turnout		9,538	62.52%	-5.26%
Social Credit hold		Swing		12.78%
Source(s) Source: "Okotoks-High River Official Results 1948 Alberta general election". Alberta Heritage Community Foundation.

=== 1952 ===
1952 Alberta general election
Party	Candidate	Votes	%	±%
Social Credit	Ivan Casey	3,077	70.44%	7.11%
Liberal	Harold Sears	1,291	29.56%	2.98%
Total		4,368	–	–
Rejected, spoiled and declined		277	–	–
Eligible electors / turnout		7,171	64.77%	2.26%
Social Credit hold		Swing		2.06%
Source(s) Source: "Okotoks-High River Official Results 1952 Alberta general election". Alberta Heritage Community Foundation.

=== 1955 ===
1955 Alberta general election
Party	Candidate	Votes	%	±%
Liberal–Conservative	Ross Laird Ellis	2,607	51.23%	–
Social Credit	Ivan Casey	2,482	48.77%	-21.67%
Total		5,089	–	–
Rejected, spoiled and declined		178	–	–
Eligible electors / turnout		6,815	77.29%	12.51%
Liberal–Conservative gain from Social Credit		Swing		-19.22%
Source(s) Source: "Okotoks-High River Official Results 1955 Alberta general election". Alberta Heritage Community Foundation.

=== 1959 ===
1959 Alberta general election
Party	Candidate	Votes	%	±%
Social Credit	Ernest George Hansell	2,642	51.42%	2.65%
Independent	Ross Laird Ellis	1,427	27.77%	-33.46%
Progressive Conservative	James S. McLeod	1,069	20.81%	–
Total		5,138	–	–
Rejected, spoiled and declined		N/A	–	–
Eligible electors / turnout		6,939	74.05%	-3.24%
Social Credit gain from Liberal–Conservative		Swing		10.60%
Source(s) Source: "Okotoks-High River Official Results 1959 Alberta general election". Alberta Heritage Community Foundation.

=== 1963 ===
1963 Alberta general election
Party	Candidate	Votes	%	±%
Social Credit	Edward P. Benoit	2,361	52.70%	1.28%
Progressive Conservative	Samuel Brown	1,585	35.38%	14.57%
Liberal	Robert E. G. Armstrong	448	10.00%	–
New Democratic	Bill Steemson	86	1.92%	–
Total		4,480	–	–
Rejected, spoiled and declined		13	–	–
Eligible electors / turnout		6,842	65.67%	-8.38%
Social Credit hold		Swing		-3.16%
Source(s) Source: "Okotoks-High River Official Results 1963 Alberta general election". Alberta Heritage Community Foundation.

=== 1967 ===
1967 Alberta general election
Party	Candidate	Votes	%	±%
Social Credit	Edward P. Benoit	2,289	48.85%	-3.85%
Progressive Conservative	Thomas E. Hughes	2,097	44.75%	9.37%
New Democratic	Georgina M. Smith	212	4.52%	2.60%
Liberal	Ron A. Baker	88	1.88%	-9.12%
Total		4,686	–	–
Rejected, spoiled and declined		34	–	–
Eligible electors / turnout		6,607	71.44%	5.77%
Social Credit hold		Swing		-6.61%
Source(s) Source: "Okotoks-High River Official Results 1967 Alberta general election". Alberta Heritage Community Foundation.

== Plebiscite results ==
=== 1957 liquor plebiscite ===
1957 Alberta liquor plebiscite results: Okotoks—High River
Question A: Do you approve additional types of outlets for the sale of beer, wine and spirituous liquor subject to a local vote?
Ballot choice	Votes	%
Yes	2,088	62.18%
No	1,270	37.82%
Total votes	3,358	100%
Rejected, spoiled and declined	33	
6,602 eligible electors, turnout 51.36%

On October 30, 1957, a stand-alone plebiscite was held province wide in all 50 of the then current provincial electoral districts in Alberta. The government decided to consult Alberta voters to decide on liquor sales and mixed drinking after a divisive debate in the legislature. The plebiscite was intended to deal with the growing demand for reforming antiquated liquor control laws.

The plebiscite was conducted in two parts. Question A, asked in all districts, asked the voters if the sale of liquor should be expanded in Alberta, while Question B, asked in a handful of districts within the corporate limits of Calgary and Edmonton, asked if men and women should be allowed to drink together in establishments.

Province wide Question A of the plebiscite passed in 33 of the 50 districts while Question B passed in all five districts. Okotoks-High River voted in favour of the proposal by a wide margin. Voter turnout in the district was well above the province wide average of 46%.

Official district returns were released to the public on December 31, 1957. The Social Credit government in power at the time did not consider the results binding. However the results of the vote led the government to repeal all existing liquor legislation and introduce an entirely new Liquor Act.

Municipal districts lying inside electoral districts that voted against the plebiscite were designated Local Option Zones by the Alberta Liquor Control Board and considered effective dry zones. Business owners who wanted a licence had to petition for a binding municipal plebiscite in order to be granted a licence.

== See also ==
- List of Alberta provincial electoral districts
- Canadian provincial electoral districts
