= William Aberhart =

Premier of Alberta (1935–1943)

The Honourable William Aberhart MLA
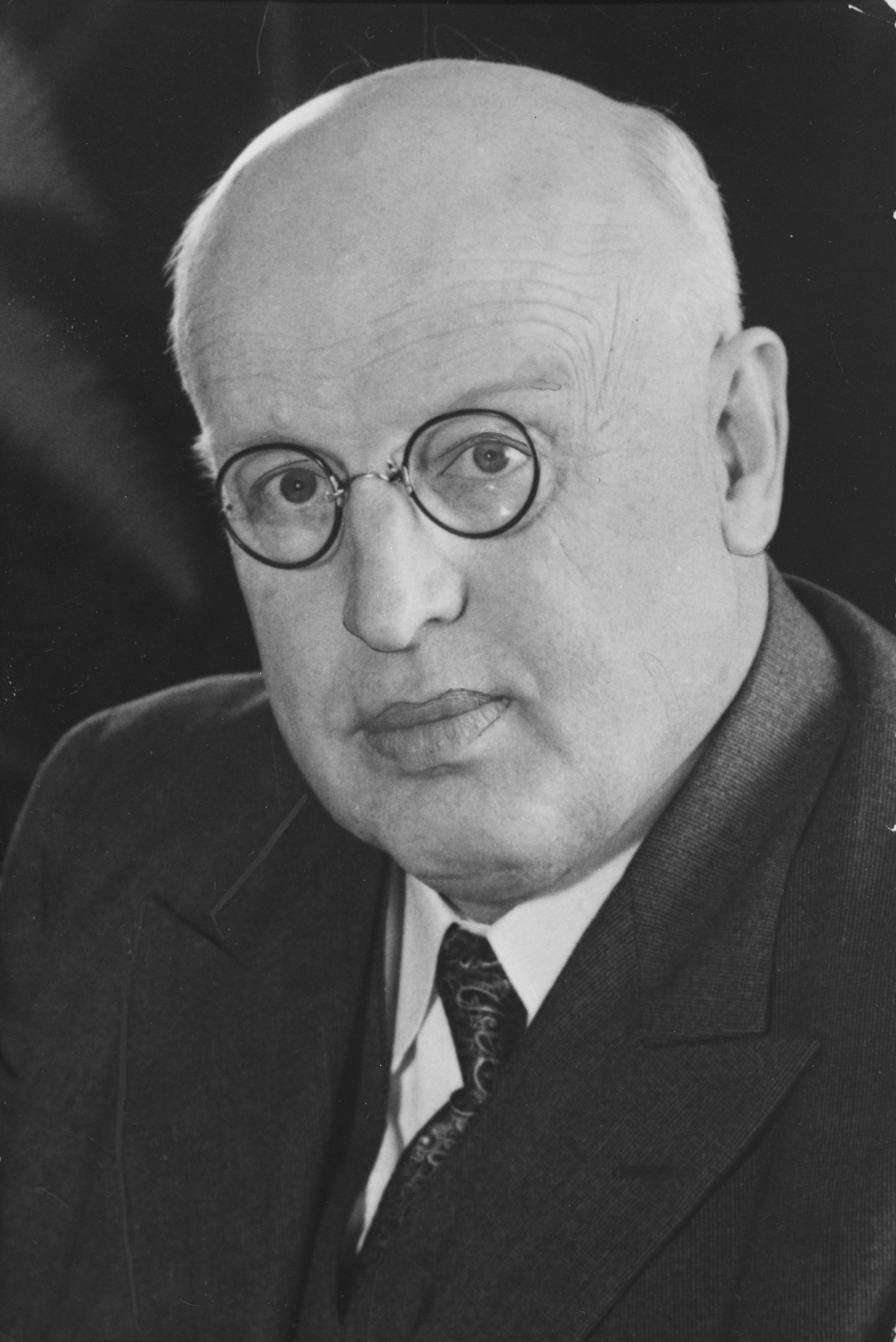
- Aberhart in 1937

7th Premier of Alberta
- In office September 3, 1935 – May 23, 1943
- Monarchs: George V; Edward VIII; George VI
- Lieutenant Governor: William L. Walsh; Philip Primrose; John C. Bowen
- Preceded by: Richard Gavin Reid
- Succeeded by: Ernest Manning

Alberta Minister of Education
- In office September 3, 1935 – May 23, 1943
- Preceded by: Perren Baker
- Succeeded by: Solon Earl Low

Member of the Legislative Assembly of Alberta
- In office March 21, 1940 – May 23, 1943
- Constituency: Calgary
- In office November 4, 1935 – March 21, 1940
- Preceded by: William Morrison
- Succeeded by: John Broomfield
- Constituency: Okotoks-High River

Personal details
- Born: December 30, 1878 Kippen, Ontario, Canada
- Died: May 23, 1943 (aged 64) Vancouver, British Columbia, Canada
- Resting place: Forest Lawn Memorial Park (Burnaby), Canada
- Party: Social Credit
- Spouse: Jessie Flatt
- Children: 2
- Occupation: Educator, evangelist

William Aberhart (December 30, 1878 – May 23, 1943), also known as "Bible Bill" for his radio sermons about the Bible, was a Canadian politician and the seventh premier of Alberta from 1935 to his death in 1943. He was the founder and first leader of the Alberta Social Credit Party, which believed the Great Depression was caused by ordinary people not having enough to spend. Therefore, Aberhart argued that the government should give each Albertan $25 per month ($565.97 in 2025) to spend to stimulate the economy, by providing needed purchasing power to allow needy customers to buy from waiting businesses.

During his premiership, Aberhart campaigned for and instituted several anti-poverty and debt relief programs, and other governmental reforms, such as consolidation of Alberta's numerous small school districts into centralized school divisions, and natural resources conservation. His attempts at banking reform met with less success, facing strong opposition from the federal government, the courts, privately owned newspapers and a coalition of the Liberal and Conservative parties. Aberhart's government did successfully establish the Alberta Treasury Branches (now ATB Financial), a government-owned financial institution to provide an alternative to existing banks, which continues to operate as a Crown corporation of the Alberta government.

== Early life ==
=== Childhood, education, and family ===
William Aberhart was born December 30, 1878, in Kippen, Ontario (now part of Bluewater, Ontario) to William (c. 1844 – 1910) and Louisa (c. 1850–1944) (née Pepper) Aberhart. William Aberhart Sr. had immigrated to Canada from Germany with his family at the age of seven, while Louisa Pepper was born in Perth County, Ontario. Historian Harold Schultz describes the Aberharts as "prosperous", while biographers David Elliott and Iris Miller says they "lived better than the average family". The fourth of eight children, William Aberhart Jr. delivered milk to his father's customers before school each day. At school, he was a hard-working but average student. Mathematics was one of his strengths, though his approach involved more rote learning than reasoning. Elliott and Miller suggest that this tendency stayed with him his entire life, and that he "never really acquired an appreciation for inductive intellectual analysis". Aberhart was not a social child. Though he excelled at soccer, he generally preferred solitary pursuits such as reading or teaching himself to play musical instruments.

In 1896, Aberhart attended three months of model school in Mitchell. Although this training qualified him to work as a schoolteacher, he instead enrolled in business college in Chatham, from which he withdrew after four months of successful study. In 1897–98, Aberhart attended Seaforth Collegiate Institute, where he was nicknamed "Whitey" (for his blond hair) and broadened his athletic prowess to include the long jump, shot put, 100-yard dash, high jump, cycling, and football.

On July 29, 1902, Aberhart married Jessie Flatt, whom he had met in 1901 at a football game. A daughter, Khona Louise Aberhart, was born in the winter of 1903, and a second, Ola Janet Aberhart, followed in August 1905.

On July 20, 1910, William Aberhart Sr. died in an accident at a pharmacy owned by his son (William Jr.'s brother) Charles. Prohibition was in effect, but pharmacists were permitted to provide alcohol for "medicinal purposes". Charles kept a bottle of whiskey for William Sr. to drink whenever he was in the store. One day a clerk rearranged the bottles, and the illiterate William Sr. took a swallow of carbolic acid; he died within minutes. William Jr., by now in Calgary, did not make the trip east to his father's funeral. Louisa Aberhart died February 20, 1944, outliving her son, William Aberhart Jr., by less than a year.

In 1911, he earned a Bachelor of Arts degree from Queen's University in Kingston, Ontario.

=== Teaching career ===
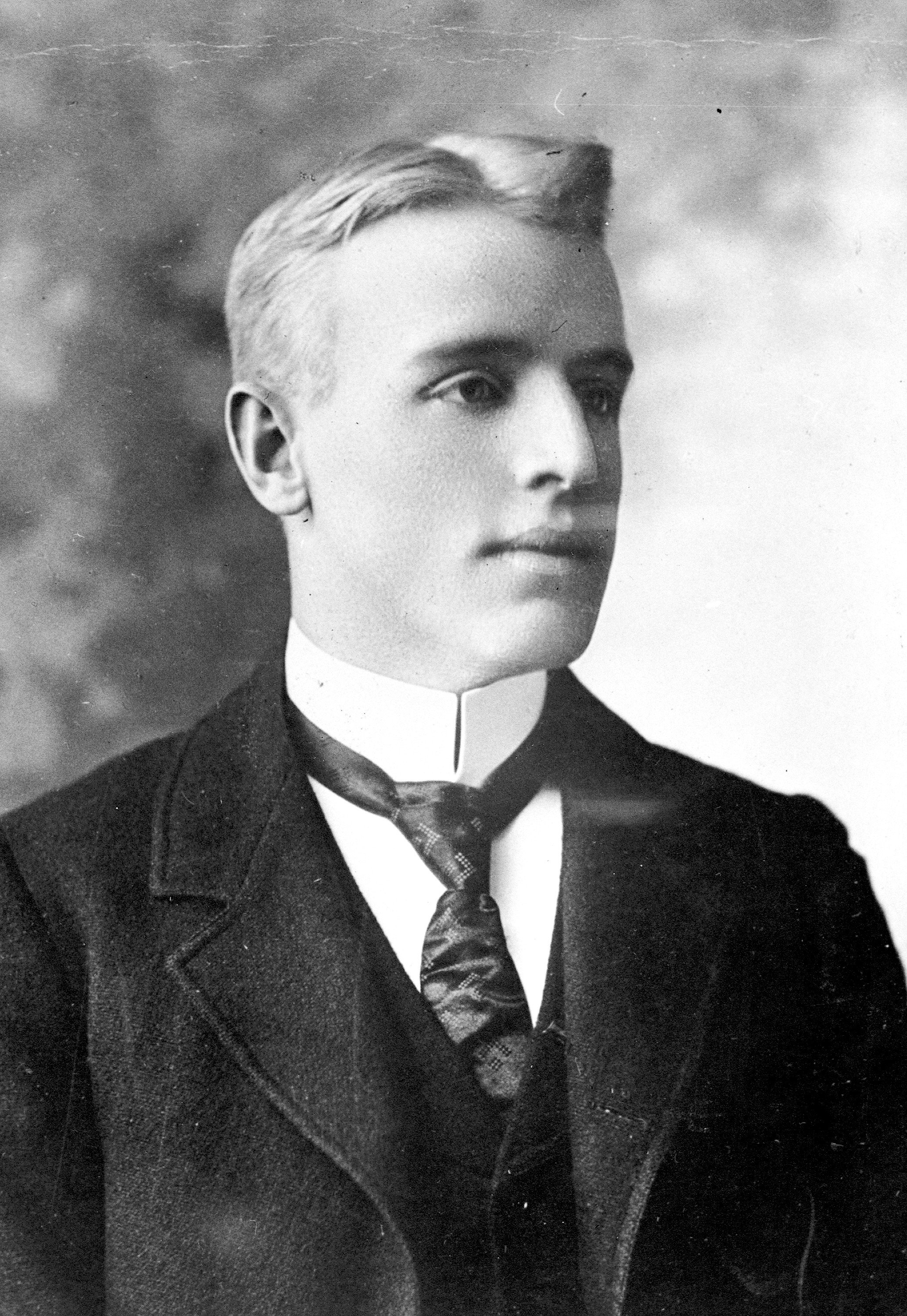
Aberhart as a young man

In the fall of 1901 Aberhart was hired as a teacher at the Central Public School in Brantford, for which he was paid $60 per month. He fast won a reputation as a strict disciplinarian: he addressed his students by number rather than name and was liberal in his use of the strap. By his own account in a 1903 essay, he viewed the classroom as a battlefield, and admired Oliver Cromwell's military organization. While his tactics divided his students—some loved him, while others recounted that "he did everything he could to break the spirit of a child"—his supervisors gave him uniformly positive reviews.

His school's principal died in 1905, and Aberhart was selected to replace him; his salary increased to $1,000 per year. This figure had reached $1,200 by 1910 when, in response to glowing reviews from his colleagues, the Calgary Board of Education offered him a principalship at $1,400 per year. In response to a petition from his staff and students that this offer be matched by Brantford, Aberhart was offered a raise to $1,300; he declined it, and moved to Calgary that spring. His family followed later, after he purchased a two-storey wooden house and Khona finished her academic year in Brantford. 1910 Calgary was a frontier town that smelled of horse manure and in which public drunkenness was common; though Aberhart's sensibilities were less shocked by this than his wife's were, he also had to make some adjustments: in Brantford he had always attended church in a silk top hat and frock coat, but he quickly abandoned this custom after discovering that he was the only one in Calgary to do so.

Aberhart was to become principal of Mount Royal School, but it was not yet complete at the time of his arrival, so he became the principal of Alexandra Public School immediately on his arrival. Mount Royal was still not completed by the fall, so he took over the principalship of Victoria School, which he held until becoming principal of the new Crescent Heights High School in 1915. (Note: Schultz reports this date as 1927, saying that Aberhart was principal of "Balmoral Heights" from 1915 until then. This confusion may be because when Crescent Heights opened in 1915, it occupied part of Balmoral School, an elementary school. Crescent Heights received its own building in 1929.)

Elliott and Miller write that Aberhart took a less rigid approach to discipline at Crescent Heights than he had in Ontario, though Schultz says that as principal he was "authoritarian in manner and a strict disciplinarian". His love of organization persisted, and his penchant for it enhanced his reputation as "an able administrator". Crescent Height's students scored very well on departmental examinations, though some members of the school board believed that he achieved this at least partly by culling weaker students with a preliminary qualifying examination.

One way Aberhart applied his organizational prowess was in creating one of Calgary's first and largest parent–teacher associations, which had an average of two hundred parents attend each meeting; Aberhart had a generally good relationship with parents. His standing with his staff was more mixed: he had a habit of "talking down" to them, dominated the school to the point that teachers were left with little initiative, and, as Elliott and Miller put it, "never entered the staff room except to issue an order". Many of his teachers, while respecting his abilities as an administrator, thought very little of him as a man, and some believed that his domineering approach stemmed from a fear of people smarter than him. In 1919, eight Crescent Heights teachers wrote the school board requesting an investigation into Aberhart's work; the resulting inspection led to the transfer of three male teachers—with whom Aberhart had a particularly poor rapport—to other schools, and stated that persisting problems would lead to a request for Aberhart's resignation. A follow-up investigation two years later found a substantial improvement in conditions and reported favourably on Aberhart's abilities. Despite this uneven relationship, Aberhart was not all together closed-minded, and would entertain—and sometimes even be convinced by—arguments from his staff.

Besides his administrative duties, Aberhart taught English and math. True to form, in doing so he emphasized rote memorization at the expense of independent reasoning, to the point that one of his teachers once likened him to a dog trainer. He cared for his students and provided extensive extra tutoring, especially for students in whom he saw a genuine interest in learning the material. Outside of the classroom, he applied his talents to organizing picnics and games, and in 1922 organized an elected student council years before the concept became widespread in Calgary. When some students wanted the school to purchase a movie projector not provided for in the school's budget, Aberhart organized a company into which students could buy for ten cents per share; the company put on movies for which it charged admission, and at the end of its first year of operation it declared a dividend of 25 cents per share. He urged his students to adopt four axioms he followed in his own life: "be enthusiastic, be ambitious, develop a distinctive personality, [and] have a hobby and ride it hard."

John Barr, a Social Credit staffer years after Aberhart's death who later wrote a history of the party's years in power, wrote "Aberhart generally had the respect and admiration of a broad following of parents, teachers, and students." The only point of agreement for the 61 people whom Schultz interviewed in researching Aberhart's career was that he was an excellent high school teacher.

== Ministry ==
Though his parents were not churchgoers, as a child Aberhart attended Sunday school at a Presbyterian church. Under circumstances that are not clear to history, in high school he became a devout Christian. He initially adopted Biblical literalism, though while at normal school he was exposed to more liberal versions of Christianity that taught the existence of internal inconsistencies in the Bible; for several years he adopted the approach of a Bible teacher who counselled him to "treat [the] Bible as ... a nice plate of fish" and "eat the meat and leave the bones for the dogs". Though at first he subscribed to the notion of unconditional election, and worried about whether he was destined for salvation, he later adopted the Arminian doctrine of conditional election, and became confident that, through his faith, he would be saved.

While in Brantford, Aberhart studied at Zion Presbyterian church, where he became interested in Biblical prophecy, which in turn led him to Dispensationalism. Dispensationalism held that history was divided into seven dispensations, during each of which God made a covenant with man, and during each of which man broke the covenant. That the terms of the covenant were different in each dispensation resolved Aberhart's earlier concerns about the Bible's internal inconsistencies. His views were heavily influenced by a correspondence course he took offered by American Dispensationalist Cyrus Scofield; Elliott and Miller speculate that such a course would have appealed to Aberhart by reducing "difficult theological problems to a matter of memorizing questions and answers".

Aberhart had aspired to take ministerial training at the Presbyterian Knox College Divinity School, but the church in Brantford was reluctant to take on the support of both him and his family in the four-year training period. He became fascinated with prophetical teaching in the Bible and studied a correspondence course by Cyrus Scofield. He had been introduced to this system while attending a men's Bible Class at Zion Presbyterian, taught by William Nichol, an elderly physician.

In 1910, Aberhart accepted a position as principal of Alexandra School in Calgary, Alberta. His initial Bible Study Teaching in Calgary commenced at the Grace Presbyterian Church at the Young Men's Bible Class. Within a few weeks attendance was over 100 and he attracted the attendance of the senior minister Dr. Esler, but his views on prophecy did not jibe with senior minister's reformed beliefs and his teaching privileges were cancelled. He then moved on to teach successively at the Wesley and Trinity Methodist Churches.

In 1915, he became an unpaid pastor of Westbourne Baptist Church in Calgary. In 1918, he founded a Bible study group in the church, which grew in attendance over the years. In 1920 he was baptized by immersion. In 1925, he broadcast his Sunday sermons on the radio station CFCN, which allowed him to broadcast his prophetic preaching to listeners throughout the Canadian prairies and part of the northern United States. In 1927 he made the decision to terminate the church's affiliation with the Baptist Union of Western Canada due to theological differences with the teachings given at the union college. In 1927, he founded the Calgary Prophetic Bible Institute in a new building. The institute building also housed the Westbourne Baptist Church. In 1929, a section of church members who disagreed with his beliefs about the need for a baptism of the Holy Spirit separate from conversion, decided to return to the old building, prompting Aberhart to found Bible Institute Baptist Church. Towards the end of his life British Israelism became increasingly central to his theology. British Israelism had been an element of his theology from an early stage, but assumed further importance following the 1939 royal tour of Canada where he spoke with King George VI on the topic.

== Early political involvement ==
Aberhart became interested in politics and monetary reform during the Great Depression in Canada, a time that was especially harsh on prairie farmers. Particularly, he was drawn to the Social Credit theories of Major C. H. Douglas, a British engineer. From 1932 to 1935, Aberhart lobbied for the governing political party, the United Farmers of Alberta, to adopt these theories, but it never did.

It is doubtful that Aberhart fully understood the theories himself. The basis of Douglas's A+B theorem is that prices rise faster than incomes when regarded as a flow, and individuals' purchasing power should be supplemented through issuance of new credits that have not derived from the productive system. After Aberhart's lobbying of the United Farmers to adopt Social Credit principles was unsuccessful, he helped found the Social Credit Party of Alberta.

His enthusiasm for Social Credit was such that by 1933 he was encouraging the founding of study groups on monetary reform. By 1933, he was sharing his thoughts on the theory via the published word, by writing a series of pamphlets on Social Credit entitled Study Group Features (nos. 1 to 5). His 1935 book Social Credit Manual was well read in Alberta.

== Premier of Alberta (1935–1943) ==
=== Electoral record ===
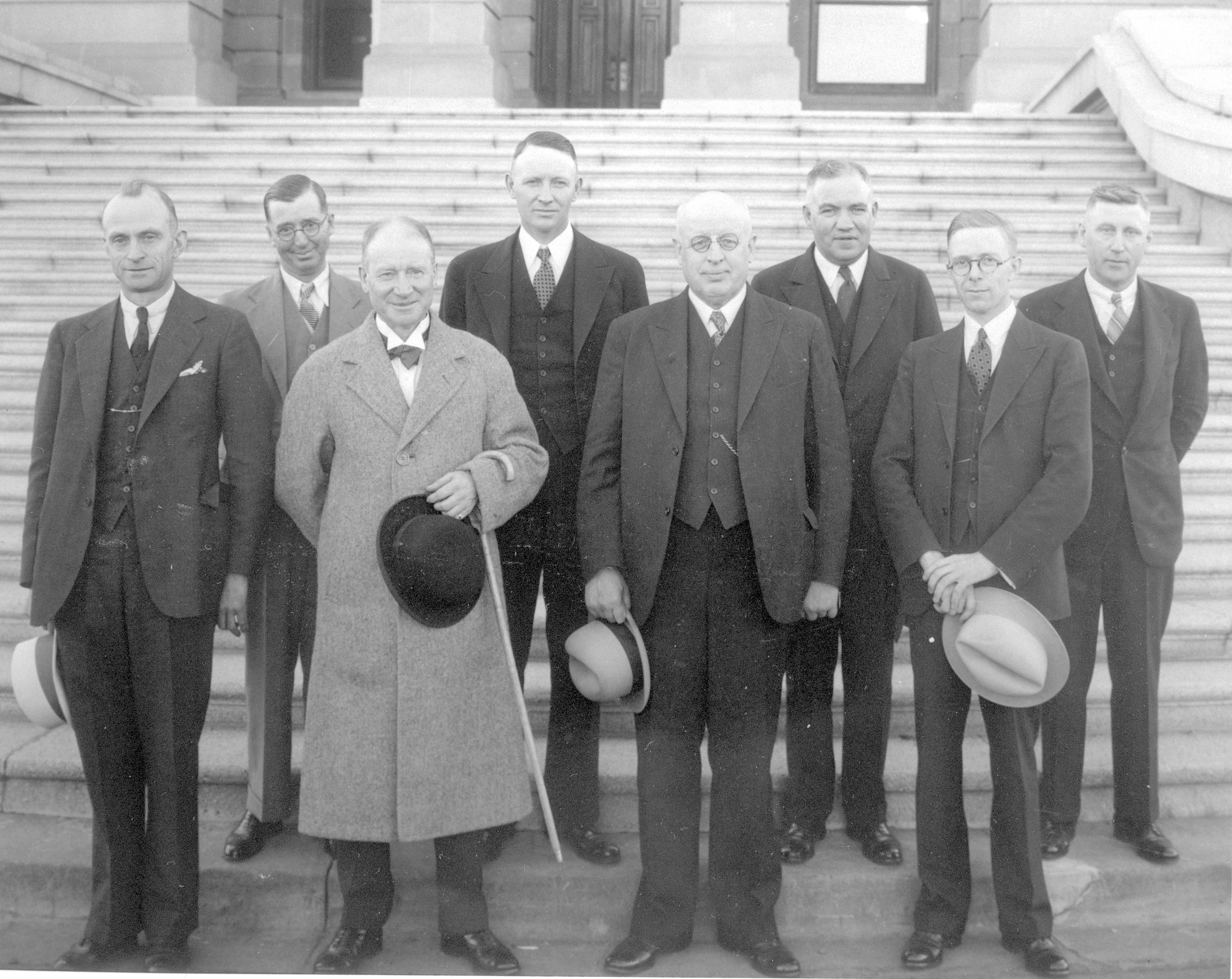
Aberhart and his cabinet in 1935

The Social Credit Party won the 1935 provincial election with over 54% of the popular vote and all but seven of the 63 seats in the legislature.

Not even the Socreds had expected to win the election. Indeed, its expectations were so low that it had not named a formal leader during the campaign. The party was now tasked with selecting a leader who would become the province's new premier. Aberhart was the obvious choice, as he had been the party's founder and guiding force. He initially said he did not want the job, but was finally prevailed to accept it.

He was sworn in as premier on September 3 (11 days after his August 22 victory).

However, he was not yet a member of the legislature. The Social Credit MLA for Okotoks-High River, William Morrison, resigned to give Aberhart a chance to get a seat, per standard practice in the Westminster system when a leader or cabinet minister does not have a seat. (Aberhart's hometown of Calgary was a city wide district so not the most practical for a by-election to fill just one seat.)

Aberhart was elected by acclamation in the November 4 by-election, held prior to the first sitting of the new legislature after the general election.

Aberhart served as premier and as his own minister of education and, starting in 1937, Attorney General. Aberhart's government was re-elected in the 1940 election with a somewhat reduced mandate, with Aberhart being elected to a Calgary seat. The constituents in the Turner Valley district had organized a recall initiative against Aberhart as their MLA, in 1937.

=== Policy ===
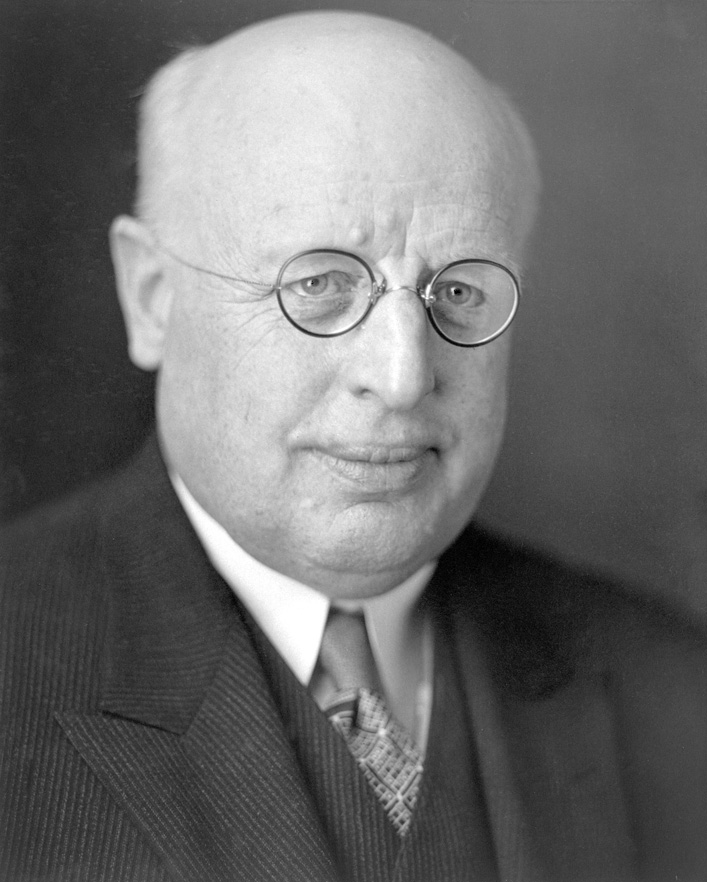
Portrait of Aberhart as premier

During its first term in power, Aberhart's Social Credit government was shackled by the province's poor financial situation. It even reneged on its own bond issue. It experienced unrelenting criticism from newspapers and responded with un-useful laws, and faced opposition from the business community and from a new fusion party of Conservatives, Liberals and others.

But in its first term the government achieved two projects that the previous United Farmers government had attempted but failed to do. It consolidated school districts into school divisions, and in 1938 it passed Natural Resources Conservation legislation to stop the flaring off of natural gas in the Turner Valley oil-field and it cut production in an attempt to give the oli-field long-term sustainability.

Aberhart's government did not fulfill many of the Social Credit promises that were in the party's election platform. In part this was because of the province's almost disastrous financial position in the depths of the Depression. But it did issue its own money in the form of "prosperity certificates", established its own provincially-owned banks (ATB) and passed laws to prevent foreclosures of debt-ridden farms.

The federal government opposed Aberhart's Social Credit proposals and was a significant block to the achievement of his goals. The federal government has jurisdiction over Canadian currency and banks, under the British North America Act, 1867. However, there was no constitutional barrier to Alberta producing its own currency, which Aberhart's government did to a limited degree with its prosperity certificates. Aberhart did threaten the power of private banks with his government's extension of the UFA government's foreclosure moratorium and mandatory debt adjustment. But a law to tax banks was overturned on constitutional grounds. Later, the government started its own banks, which carry on as the Alberta Treasury Branch (ATB Financial).

Although Aberhart was unable to gain control of Alberta's banks, his government gained a foothold in the province's financial industry by creating the Alberta Treasury Branches in 1938. Its operations included special credit given for those who bought made-in-Alberta goods. ATB has become Aberhart's legacy, operating as an orthodox financial institution and Crown corporation. His government also encouraged the founding of small-scale grassroots credit unions. The government also issued its own money in the form of prosperity certificates, a form of Gesell-style stamped scrip.

Aberhart instituted a variety of relief programs to help people out of poverty, as well as public works programs and a debt relief program that froze some debt collections and mortgage foreclosures. This, like Tommy Douglas' similar program in Saskatchewan, was later overturned in the mid-1940s by the Supreme Court, although it aided people for a number of years during and (for a short time) after the Great Depression.

Alberta's Social Credit government brought in legislation under which an MLA could be recalled by a portion of their constituents. Aberhart's own constituents, including out-of-power UFA farmers and oilworkers working for U.S. oil companies threatened by Aberhart's Natural Resources Conservation legislation, gathered signatures for Aberhart's own recall. He thus became the first Canadian politician to be threatened with recall from office. Aberhart's government retroactively repealed the recall legislation rather than have Aberhart forced to give up his seat. (He ran for re-election in a different district.)

In keeping with his evangelical views, Aberhart adhered to social conservatism despite his support for Major Douglas's sensational "funny-money" ideas. Aberhart enacted tight restrictions on the sale and consumption of alcohol. Indeed, the only stricter law in Canada at the time was in Prince Edward Island, where the sale of alcohol remained completely banned until 1948. Well into the 1960s, commercial airlines could not serve alcohol while flying over Alberta.

=== Conflict with Lieutenant Governor ===
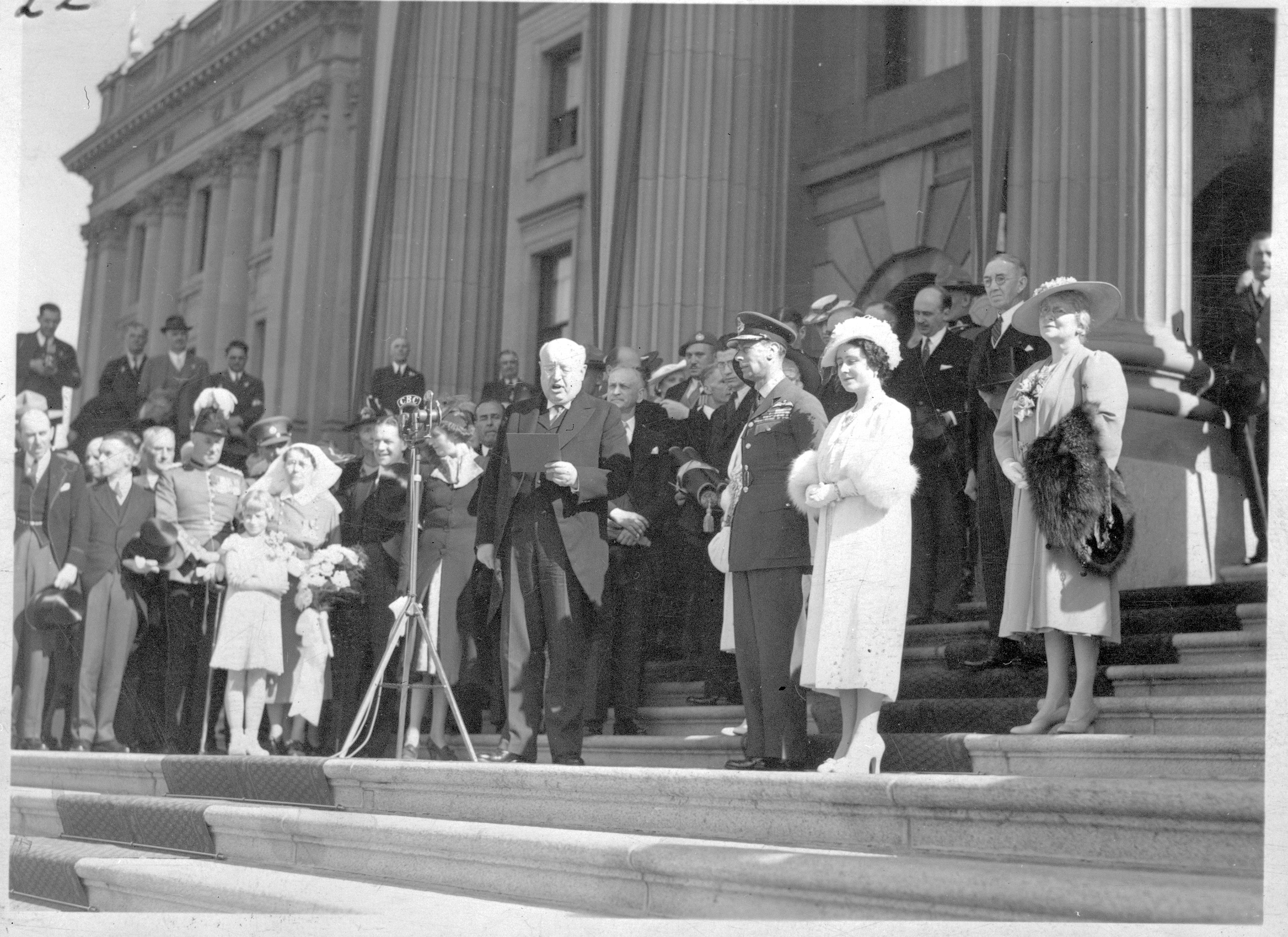
Aberhart (speaking) welcoming King George VI and Queen Elizabeth to Alberta in May 1939

Lieutenant Governor John C. Bowen refused to give royal assent to three government bills in 1937. Two of the bills would have put the province's banks under the control of the provincial government, while a third, the Accurate News and Information Act, would have forced newspapers to print government rebuttals to stories the provincial cabinet deemed "inaccurate". All three bills were later declared unconstitutional by the Supreme Court of Canada and the Judicial Committee of the Privy Council. For its leadership in the fight against the latter act, in 1938 the Edmonton Journal was awarded a Pulitzer Prize special citation and bronze plaque, the first time a special citation was awarded outside the United States, while 95 other newspapers including the Calgary Herald, the Red Deer News, Lethbridge Herald and the province's weekly newspapers were recognized with engraved certificates.

By late 1937, relations with the lieutenant governor became so strained that Bowen even considered dismissing Aberhart's government, which would have been an extraordinary use of his reserve powers. (An analogous situation occurred in 1932 in Australia between Jack Lang and Sir Philip Game, the premier and governor, respectively, of New South Wales.) However, Bowen did not follow through on his threat due in part to Social Credit's immense popularity with Albertans. Anyways, had he dismissed Aberhart's government, Aberhart's Social Credit party would have almost certainly won the resulting election.

The friction between Aberhart and Bowen was eventually ironed out, and Bowen's occupancy of the post was renewed, with him serving to 1950.

=== Aberhart's last years as premier ===
Even after being stymied in his most radical proposals for monetary reform, Aberhart continued to push for those sort of changes. Even as late as 1943, when the world was engulfed in a world war, he published the book Conscription of the Monetary System!.

Starting in 1942 and continuing up to his death in 1943, Aberhart issued 29 broadcasts on "Post-war Reconstruction" in which he laid out a Social Credit plan to renew Canada after the war with freer access to money than had been the case during the hard times of the Depression. Transcriptions of these broadcasts were published as booklets.

== Death and legacy ==
Aberhart died unexpectedly on May 23, 1943, during a visit to his adult daughters in Vancouver, British Columbia. He was interred in the Forest Lawn Memorial Park in Burnaby as his widow intended to move to Vancouver to be close to her children. For years, the Aberhart's had been discussing retiring to the Coast as soon as, as William Aberhart put it, the "present outworn economic system has been replaced by something better."

Aberhart was succeeded as the premier of Alberta by his long-time disciple, Ernest C. Manning, who gradually moved away from Douglas' monetary reform theories. The Social Credit government remained in office until its defeat in 1971. It was one of the longest-serving provincial governments in Canadian history and one of the longest-serving in the Commonwealth.

The Aberhart Centre, a long-term medical care centre at the University of Alberta Hospital in Edmonton, is named in his honour, as is William Aberhart High School in Calgary.

In 1974, Aberhart was named a Person of National Historic Significance by the Government of Canada. A plaque commemorating this sits inside Crescent Heights High School at 1019 1st NW, Calgary, Alberta.

== Ideology ==
Elliott (1978) argues that the Aberhart's Social Credit ideology was clearly antithetical to his previous theology, which was highly sectarian, separatist, apolitical, other-worldly, and eschatologically oriented. Elliott challenges the arguments of Mann (1955) and Irving (1959) that there was a definite connection between Aberhart's theology and political program. Elliott reports that Aberhart's political support did not come from the sectarian groups as Mann and Irving suggest, but rather it came from the members of established churches and those with marginal religious commitment.

== Publications and articles about Aberhart ==
Historian Harold J. Schultz's 1964 "Portrait of a Premier: William Aberhart" was published in the Canadian Historical Review. A 1977 book edited by Lewis Herbert Thomas, traced Aberhart's role in the development of Alberta's Social Credit movement.

In his 1978 article published in the Canadian Historical Review, David R. Elliot examined Aberhart's theological and political beliefs.

Elliot and Iris Miller published Bible Bill: A Biography of William Aberhart in 1987. A 2004 edited book —Alberta Premiers of the Twentieth Century, devoted a chapter to Aberhart.

A June 2020 in-depth article in Alberta Views magazine, compared Alberta Premier Jason Kenney to Aberhart.

Bruce Allen Powe in 1983 published a novel entitled The Aberhart Summer based on the events of 1935 when Aberhart swept into power. The novel was adapted as a stage play in 1999 by Conni Massing.

== Electoral record ==
November 4, 1935, provincial by-election Okotoks—High River

1935 by-election results (Okotoks-High River)			
Affiliation	Candidate	Votes N.A.	%
Social Credit	William Aberhart	Acclaimed	

1940 Alberta general election results (Calgary)		First count vote totals*	
Independent	Andrew Davison (Note: Calgary was a multi-member constituency that elected five MLAs using the single transferable vote electoral method. These candidates were elected.)	12,465	27.1%
Social Credit	William Aberhart	12,122	26.4%
Independent	James Mahaffey	3,645	7.9%
Independent	John J. Bowlen	3,447	7.5%
CCF	Frederick J. White	2,846	6.2%
Independent	Joseph Tweed Shaw	2,685	5.8%
Social Credit	Frederic Anderson	1,939	4.2%
Social Credit	Edith Gostick	1,605	3.5%
Independent	Norman D. Dingle	1,480	3.2%
Social Credit	Mrs. Howitt D. Tarves	1,386	3.0%
CCF	Robert T. Alderman	1,298	2.8%
Independent	Harry Pryde	576	1.3%
Independent	Douglas V. Mitchell	251	0.5%
Independent	James M. Moodie	169	0.4%

* The first count vote totals were altered through STV vote transfers, to produce the five successful candidates, one of which was not in a leading position in the first count.

== See also ==
- History of Alberta
- 1937 Social Credit backbenchers' revolt
- Henry Hildebrand
- Sinclair Alexander Whittaker
- Briercrest College and Seminary

== Further reading/other sources ==
- Bell, Edward (1993). Social Classes & Social Credit in Alberta. Montreal and Kingston: McGill-Queen's University Press. ISBN 0-7735-1168-7.
- Bell, Edward (2004). "Ernest Manning, 1943-1968". In Rennie, Bradford J. (ed.). Alberta Premiers of the Twentieth Century. Regina, Saskatchewan: Canadian Plains Research Center, University of Regina. pp. 148–178. ISBN 0-88977-151-0.
- Brennan, Brian (2008). The Good Steward: The Ernest C. Manning Story. Calgary, Alberta: Fifth House Ltd. ISBN 978-1-897252-16-1.
- Byrne, T. C. (1991). Alberta's Revolutionary Leaders. Calgary, Alberta: Detselig Enterprises. ISBN 1-55059-024-3.
- Calderola, Carlo (1979). "The Social Credit in Alberta, 1935-1971". In Calderola, C. (ed.). Society and Politics in Alberta. Methuen. pp. 33–48. ISBN 9780458939107.
- Clark, S. D. (November 1945). "The Religious Sect in Canadian Politics". The American Journal of Sociology. 51 (3). University of Chicago Press: 207–216. doi:10.1086/219788. JSTOR 2770421. S2CID 145557571.
- Cook, Ramsay, ed. (1967). Politics of Discontent: Essays by H. J. Schultz, M. A. Ormsby, J. R. H. Wilbur, B. J. Young. University of Toronto Press.
- Elliott, David R. (2004). "William Aberhart, 1935-1943". In Rennie, Bradford J. (ed.). Alberta Premiers of the Twentieth Century. Regina, Saskatchewan: Canadian Plains Research Center, University of Regina. pp. 126–145. ISBN 0-88977-151-0.
- Finkel, Alvin (1989). The Social Credit Phenomenon in Alberta. Toronto, Ontario: University of Toronto Press. ISBN 0-8020-6731-X.
- Flanagan, Thomas (1972). "Social Credit in Alberta: A Canadian 'Cargo Cult'?". Archives de Sociologie des Religions. 34 (34). Paris, France: École des hautes études en sciences sociales: 39–48. doi:10.3406/assr.1972.1889. JSTOR 30115621.
- Flanagan, Thomas; Lee, Martha F. (Fall 1991). "From Social Credit to Social Conservatism: The Evolution of an Ideology". Prairie Forum. 16 (2). Regina, Saskatchewan: Canadian Plains Research Center: 205–223. hdl:10294/256.
- Foster, Franklin L. (1981). John E. Brownlee: A Biography. Lloydminster, Alberta: Foster Learning Inc. ISBN 978-1-55220-004-9.
- Irving, John A. (1959). The Social Credit Movement in Alberta. University of Toronto Press. ISBN 9780802060846.
- Mackey, Lloyd (1997). Like father, like son: Ernest Manning & Preston Manning. Toronto, Ontario: ECW Press. ISBN 1-55022-299-6.
- MacPherson, C. B. (2013) [1953]. Democracy in Alberta: Social Credit and the Party System (3rd ed.). Toronto, Ontario: University of Toronto Press. ISBN 978-1-4426-1575-5.
- Mallory, J. R. (1976) [1954]. Social Credit and the Federal Power in Canada (reprint ed.). Toronto, Ontario: University of Toronto Press. ISBN 0-8020-6301-2.
- Neatby, H. Blair (2003) [1972]. The Politics of Chaos: Canada in the Thirties (reprint ed.). Kemptville, Ontario: Haymax. ISBN 1-894908-01-5.
- Thomas, Lewis Herbert, ed. (1977). William Aberhart and Social Credit in Alberta. Toronto, Ontario: Copp Clark. ISBN 978-0-7730-3128-9.
- Wardhaugh, Robert Alexander (2000). MacKenzie King and the Prairie West. Toronto, Ontario: University of Toronto Press. ISBN 0-8020-4733-5.

=== Primary sources ===
- Aberhart, William (October 2005). "Aberhart On Social Credit: A Radio Broadcast". Alberta History (transcript of a 1935 radio broadcast). 53 (4). Historical Society of Alberta: 24–30.
- Aberhart, William (1991). Elliott, David R. (ed.). Aberhart: Outpourings and Replies. Historical Society of Alberta. pp. 1–41. ISBN 9781895379082.
- Manning, Ernest C. (1967). Political Realignment: A Challenge to Thoughtful Canadians. Toronto, Ontario: McClelland and Stewart.
