= Blackie, Alberta =

Blackie
- Hamlet
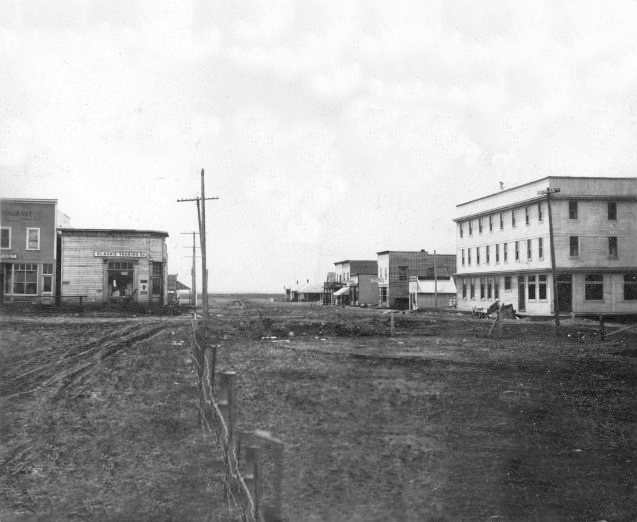
- Blackie, 1913

- Location of Blackie Blackie (Canada)
- Coordinates: 50°36′16″N 113°37′22″W
- Country: Canada
- Province: Alberta
- Region: Calgary Metropolitan Region
- Census division: 6
- Municipal district: Foothills County

Government
  - Type: Unincorporated
  - Governing body: Foothills County Council

Area (2021)
  - Land: 0.76 km^{2} (0.29 sq mi)

Population (2021)
  - Total: 360
  - Density: 476/km^{2} (1,230/sq mi)
- Time zone: UTC−06:00 (Alberta Time)
- Area codes: 403, 587, 825

Blackie is a hamlet in Alberta, Canada within the Foothills County. It is located approximately 70 kilometres (43 mi) southeast of Calgary on Highway 799.

== History ==
The community was named after John Stuart Blackie, a Scottish scholar. Previously incorporated as a village on December 30, 1912, Blackie dissolved to hamlet status on August 31, 1997.

== Demographics ==
In the 2021 Census of Population conducted by Statistics Canada, Blackie had a population of 360 living in 144 of its 153 total private dwellings, a change of 14.6% from its 2016 population of 314. With a land area of 0.76 km^{2} (0.29 sq mi), it had a population density of 473.7/km^{2} (1,226.8/sq mi) in 2021.

As a designated place in the 2016 Census of Population conducted by Statistics Canada, Blackie had a population of 314 living in 126 of its 147 total private dwellings, a change of −8.5% from its 2011 population of 343. With a land area of 0.76 km^{2} (0.29 sq mi), it had a population density of 413.2/km^{2} (1,070.1/sq mi) in 2016.

== Notable residents ==
- Jeremy Colliton - professional ice hockey centre, head coach Chicago Blackhawks
- George Groeneveld - Member of the Legislature of Alberta for Highwood, November 22, 2004 - April 23, 2012
- "Boxcar" Pat Egan - former professional ice hockey defenseman

== See also ==
- List of communities in Alberta
- List of designated places in Alberta
- List of former urban municipalities in Alberta
- List of hamlets in Alberta
