= Brule, Alberta =

Brule
- Hamlet
- Location within Alberta Location within Canada Location within North America
- Coordinates: 53°18′33″N 117°52′15″W
- Country: Canada
- Province: Alberta
- Census division: No. 14
- Municipal district: Yellowhead County

Government
  - Mayor: Jim Eglinski
  - Governing body: Yellowhead County Council: Shawn Brian Berry; Sandra Cherniawsky; Anthony Giezen; Dawn Mitchell; Fred Priestley-Wright; David Russell; William Velichko; Jack Williams
  - MP: Martin Long (Cons - Yellowhead)
  - MLA: Martin Long (UCP - West Yellowhead)

Area (2021)
  - Land: 1.52 km^{2} (0.59 sq mi)
- Elevation: 1,040 m (3,410 ft)

Population (2021)
  - Total: 127
  - Density: 83.6/km^{2} (217/sq mi)
- Time zone: UTC−06:00 (Alberta Time)
- Postal code span: TOE
- Area codes: 780, 587
- Highways: Yellowhead Highway
- Waterways: Athabasca River

Brule is a hamlet in west-central Alberta, Canada within Yellowhead County. It is on the northwest shore of Brûlé Lake, approximately 20 kilometres (12 mi) west of Hinton. It has an elevation of 1,040 metres (3,410 ft).

Statistics Canada recognizes Brule as a designated place.

The hamlet is in Census Division No. 14 and in the federal riding of Yellowhead.

== Demographics ==
Population history of Brule
Year	Pop.	±%
1941	10	—
1951	197	+1870.0%
1956	91	−53.8%
1961	93	+2.2%
1966	94	+1.1%
1971	104	+10.6%
1976	48	−53.8%
1981	71	+47.9%
1986	120	+69.0%
1991	161	+34.2%
1991A	161	+0.0%
1996	200	+24.2%
2001	162	−19.0%
2011	76	−53.1%
2016	31	−59.2%
2016R	74	+138.7%
2021	127	+71.6%
Source: Statistics Canada

In the 2021 Census of Population conducted by Statistics Canada, Brule had a population of 127 living in 53 of its 57 total private dwellings, a change of 71.6% from its 2016 population of 74. With a land area of 1.52 km^{2} (0.59 sq mi), it had a population density of 83.6/km^{2} (216.4/sq mi) in 2021.

As a designated place in the 2016 Census of Population conducted by Statistics Canada, Brule had a population of 31 living in 14 of its 19 total private dwellings, a change of −59.2% from its 2011 population of 76. With a land area of 0.35 km^{2} (0.14 sq mi), it had a population density of 88.6/km^{2} (229.4/sq mi) in 2016.

== Climate ==
Brule has a subarctic climate (Köppen Dfc).

Climate data for Black Cat Mountain (Brule), Alberta (1981–2010): 1036m
Month	Jan	Feb	Mar	Apr	May	Jun	Jul	Aug	Sep	Oct	Nov	Dec	Year
Record high °C (°F)	17.5 (63.5)	19.0 (66.2)	21.7 (71.1)	23.0 (73.4)	31.0 (87.8)	31.2 (88.2)	33.8 (92.8)	32.0 (89.6)	32.0 (89.6)	26.0 (78.8)	16.5 (61.7)	14.5 (58.1)	33.8 (92.8)
Mean daily maximum °C (°F)	−3.1 (26.4)	1.3 (34.3)	4.6 (40.3)	11.0 (51.8)	15.5 (59.9)	19.4 (66.9)	22.0 (71.6)	21.2 (70.2)	17.1 (62.8)	10.6 (51.1)	2.8 (37.0)	−2.1 (28.2)	10.0 (50.0)
Daily mean °C (°F)	−10.2 (13.6)	−6.6 (20.1)	−2.6 (27.3)	3.4 (38.1)	7.8 (46.0)	12.0 (53.6)	14.2 (57.6)	13.2 (55.8)	9.0 (48.2)	3.2 (37.8)	−3.7 (25.3)	−8.7 (16.3)	2.6 (36.6)
Mean daily minimum °C (°F)	−17.3 (0.9)	−14.4 (6.1)	−9.7 (14.5)	−4.2 (24.4)	0.0 (32.0)	4.5 (40.1)	6.5 (43.7)	5.2 (41.4)	0.9 (33.6)	−4.3 (24.3)	−10.1 (13.8)	−15.2 (4.6)	−4.8 (23.3)
Record low °C (°F)	−46.5 (−51.7)	−46 (−51)	−39 (−38)	−23.5 (−10.3)	−10 (14)	−3.5 (25.7)	−2 (28)	−5 (23)	−7.5 (18.5)	−29 (−20)	−38 (−36)	−45 (−49)	−46.5 (−51.7)
Average precipitation mm (inches)	20.5 (0.81)	16.4 (0.65)	27.1 (1.07)	34.7 (1.37)	60.8 (2.39)	81.9 (3.22)	89.7 (3.53)	89.5 (3.52)	51.5 (2.03)	34.1 (1.34)	28.8 (1.13)	18.7 (0.74)	553.7 (21.8)
Average snowfall cm (inches)	19.2 (7.6)	15.4 (6.1)	24.3 (9.6)	16.2 (6.4)	8.8 (3.5)	0.0 (0.0)	0.0 (0.0)	0.0 (0.0)	3.1 (1.2)	15.4 (6.1)	24.8 (9.8)	17.4 (6.9)	144.6 (57.2)
Source: Environment Canada

== See also ==
- List of communities in Alberta
- List of designated places in Alberta
- List of hamlets in Alberta
