= By-elections to the 41st Canadian Parliament =

2011–2015 elections for vacant seats

- 2011–2015
- Results by riding. Different shading indicated party strength in the riding.

By-elections to the 41st Canadian Parliament were held to fill vacancies in the House of Commons of Canada between the 2011 federal election and the 2015 federal election. The 41st Canadian Parliament existed from 2011 to 2015 with the membership of its House of Commons having been determined by the results of the Canadian federal election held on May 2, 2011. The Conservative Party of Canada had a majority government during this Parliament.

One by-election was held in March 2012, three more in November 2012, one in May 2013; and four were held November 25, 2013. Four more by-elections were held on June 30, 2014, and another two were held on November 17, 2014.

At dissolution, three by-elections were pending, in Peterborough, Sudbury, and Ottawa West—Nepean and had been called for October 19, 2015 which was also anticipated to be the date of the next federal election. As the writ for a general election called for the same date was dropped on August 2, 2015, the by-elections were cancelled and superseded by the general election. Barrie was also a vacant seat as of May 13, 2015, due to the resignation of Patrick Brown, but parliament was dissolved before a by-election could be called.

A further by-election was to be called following an Ontario Superior Court decision voiding the result in Etobicoke Centre but the Supreme Court of Canada overturned that ruling on October 25, 2012, upholding the original election result.

By-elections must be called within 180 days of the Chief Electoral Officer being officially notified of a vacancy. Under the Canada Elections Act, the minimum length of a campaign is 36 days between dropping the writ and election day.

== Summary ==
Analysis of byelections by turnout and vote share for winning candidate (vs 2011)
Riding and winning party			Turnout		Vote share for winning candidate	
Riding and winning party			%	Change (pp)	%	Change (pp)
Toronto—Danforth	█ New Democratic	Hold	43.58	-21.32	59.44	-1.36
Calgary Centre	█ Conservative	Hold	29.51	-25.90	36.87	-20.81
Durham	█ Conservative	Hold	35.72	-27.50	50.72	-3.82
Victoria	█ New Democratic	Hold	44.02	-24.53	37.17	-13.61
Labrador	█ Liberal	Gain	59.93	6.49	47.99	8.92
Bourassa	█ Liberal	Hold	26.22	-28.90	48.12	7.21
Brandon—Souris	█ Conservative	Hold	44.81	-12.83	44.16	-19.57
Provencher	█ Conservative	Hold	33.85	-27.88	58.20	-12.40
Toronto Centre	█ Liberal	Hold	37.72	-25.21	49.38	8.37
Fort McMurray—Athabasca	█ Conservative	Hold	15.37	-25.38	46.71	-25.13
Macleod	█ Conservative	Hold	19.92	-41.60	69.16	-8.33
Scarborough—Agincourt	█ Liberal	Hold	29.43	-26.60	59.38	13.98
Trinity—Spadina	█ Liberal	Gain	31.78	-37.02	53.66	30.27
Whitby—Oshawa	█ Conservative	Hold	31.79	-31.45	49.31	-9.11
Yellowhead	█ Conservative	Hold	16.06	-40.10	62.57	-14.46

== Overview ==
By-election	Date	Incumbent	Party	Winner	Party	Cause	Retained
Yellowhead	November 17, 2014	Rob Merrifield	Conservative	Jim Eglinski	Conservative	Resigned to accept appointment as Alberta's envoy to the United States.	Yes
Whitby—Oshawa	November 17, 2014	Jim Flaherty	Conservative	Pat Perkins	Conservative	Death (heart attack)	Yes
Scarborough— Agincourt	June 30, 2014	Jim Karygiannis	Liberal	Arnold Chan	Liberal	Resigned to run for Toronto City Council.	Yes
Trinity—Spadina	June 30, 2014	Olivia Chow	New Democratic	Adam Vaughan	Liberal	Resigned to run for Mayor of Toronto.	No
Fort McMurray— Athabasca	June 30, 2014	Brian Jean	Conservative	David Yurdiga	Conservative	Resigned to return to private life.	Yes
Macleod	June 30, 2014	Ted Menzies	Conservative	John Barlow	Conservative	Resigned to accept a position in the private sector.	Yes
Brandon—Souris	November 25, 2013	Merv Tweed	Conservative	Larry Maguire	Conservative	Resigned to join private sector.	Yes
Toronto Centre	November 25, 2013	Bob Rae	Liberal	Chrystia Freeland	Liberal	Resigned to become First Nations negotiator in Ontario.	Yes
Provencher	November 25, 2013	Vic Toews	Conservative	Ted Falk	Conservative	Resigned to spend more time with his family and join the private sector.	Yes
Bourassa	November 25, 2013	Denis Coderre	Liberal	Emmanuel Dubourg	Liberal	Resigned to run for Mayor of Montreal.	Yes
Labrador	May 13, 2013	Peter Penashue	Conservative	Yvonne Jones	Liberal	Resigned to run again in a by-election following election spending concerns.	No
Victoria	November 26, 2012	Denise Savoie	New Democratic	Murray Rankin	New Democratic	Resignation due to illness	Yes
Durham	November 26, 2012	Bev Oda	Conservative	Erin O'Toole	Conservative	Resignation	Yes
Calgary Centre	November 26, 2012	Lee Richardson	Conservative	Joan Crockatt	Conservative	Resigned to work in the office of the Premier of Alberta.	Yes
Toronto—Danforth	March 19, 2012	Jack Layton	New Democratic	Craig Scott	New Democratic	Death (cancer)	Yes

== March 19, 2012 by-election ==
A by-election was held on March 19, 2012 in Toronto—Danforth, to fill a vacancy in the House of Commons caused by the death of NDP leader Jack Layton. Governor General David Johnston, acting on the advice of Prime Minister Stephen Harper, issued the writ of election for the by-election on February 6.

=== Toronto—Danforth ===
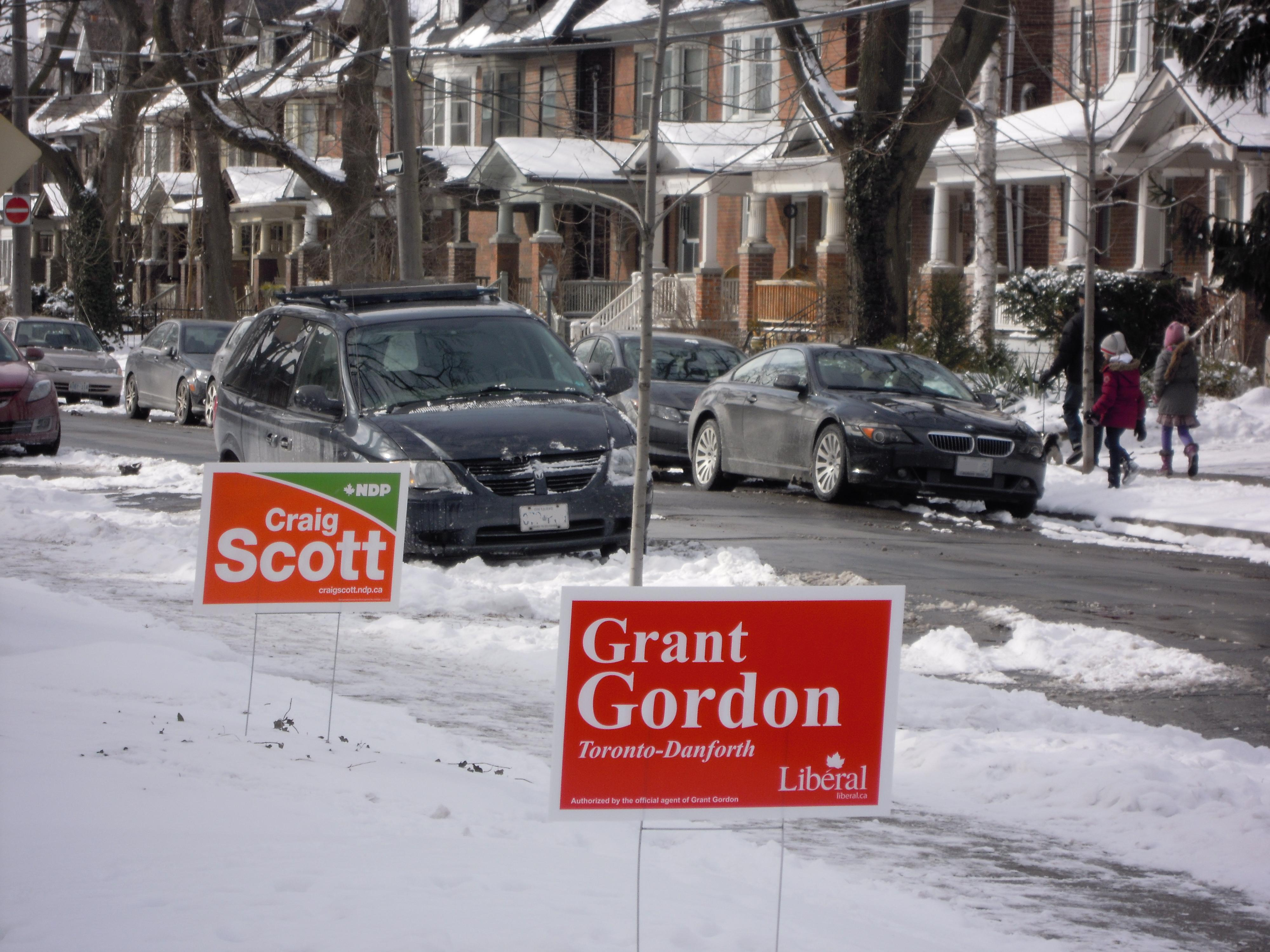
NDP and Liberal election signs in Toronto-Danforth

The riding of Toronto—Danforth had been vacant since August 22, 2011, when Jack Layton, Leader of the Official Opposition, died of cancer.

Canadian federal by-election, March 19, 2012: Toronto—Danforth Death of Jack Layton
Party	Candidate	Votes	%	±%	Expenditures
New Democratic	Craig Scott	19,210	59.44	−1.36	$ 82,847.22
Liberal	Grant Gordon	9,215	28.51	+10.89	86,016.54
Conservative	Andrew Keyes	1,736	5.37	−8.95	73,735.56
Green	Adriana Mugnatto-Hamu	1,517	4.69	−1.77	57,955.38
Progressive Canadian	Dorian Baxter	208	0.64	–	1,473.73
Libertarian	John C. Recker	133	0.41	–	2,433.05
Independent	Leslie Bory	77	0.24	–	898.69
Canadian Action	Christopher Porter	75	0.23	–	3,163.57
Independent	John Turmel	57	0.18	–	–
United	Brian Jedan	55	0.17	–	130.18
Independent	Bahman Yazdanfar	36	0.11	–	622.86
Total valid votes/expense limit		32,319	100.00		$ 86,821.95
Total rejected ballots		150	0.46	−0.13	
Turnout		32,469	43.58	−21.32	
New Democratic hold		Swing		−6.13	
Source(s) "By-election March 19, 2012 – Official Voting Results". Elections Canada. "Financial Reports: Candidate's Electoral Campaign Return – March 19, 2012 By-election".

Opinion polling
Polling Firm	Last Date of Polling	Link	NDP	Liberal	Cons.	Green	Other	Margin of Error	Sample Size	Polling Method
Forum Research	February 12, 2012	PDF	61	19	14	4	2	±4.2 pp	538	IVR
Election	May 2, 2011		60.8	17.6	14.3	6.5	0.8			

== November 26, 2012 by-elections ==
By-elections were held on November 26, 2012, in Calgary Centre following the resignation of Conservative MP Lee Richardson, in Durham as a result of the resignation of Conservative MP Bev Oda, and in Victoria following the resignation of Deputy Speaker and NDP MP Denise Savoie.

=== Calgary Centre ===
The riding of Calgary Centre was vacated on May 30, 2012, when Conservative MP Lee Richardson resigned to accept a position as principal secretary to Alberta Premier Alison Redford.

The Conservative Party had a contested nomination, with several candidates quickly entering the contest – including local alderman John Mar, newspaper columnist and political pundit Joan Crockatt, businessman Jordan Katz, former PC MLA Jon Lord, and MP Richardson's former campaign manager Stefan Spargo. Late entrants to the Conservative nomination included Quebec regional party organizer and former PMO staff member Joe Soares; lawyer and current national party policy committee member Rick Billington; and venture capitalist Greg McLean, the immediate past-president of the Calgary Centre riding association.

On July 25, Mar withdrew from the nomination race, citing future time spent in Ottawa away from his family as the major reason. Katz also withdrew from the race in late July. The nomination meeting was held on August 25, with Crockatt winning the nomination vote.

The Liberal Party held a nomination meeting on September 22, which was contested by four candidates. Early candidates in the race included conservationist and lawyer Harvey Locke and high school teacher Rahim Sajan. Several weeks before the nomination meeting, both businessman Drew Atkins and former Conservative Steve Turner entered the nomination race. At the meeting on September 22, Locke won the nomination.

Calgary-based author and Green Party candidate Chris Turner and Liberal MLA David Swann stated a desire for all "progressives" in Calgary Centre to unite around a single candidate. However, Swann dismissed numerous appeals to be the "united progressive" candidate and Green Party leader Elizabeth May expressed hopes that her party's candidate would win the seat outright. David Swann ultimately endorsed Harvey Locke.

Canadian federal by-election, November 26, 2012: Calgary Centre Resignation of Lee Richardson
Party	Candidate	Votes	%	±%	Expenditures
Conservative	Joan Crockatt	10,191	36.87	–20.81	$95,251
Liberal	Harvey Locke	9,033	32.68	+15.15	$97,025
Green	Chris Turner	7,090	25.65	+15.72	$100,180
New Democratic	Dan Meades	1,064	3.85	–11.01	$90,148
Independent	Antony Tony Grochowski	141	0.51	–	none listed
Libertarian	Tony Prashad	121	0.44	–	$255
Total valid votes/expense limit		27,640	99.67	–	$102,128.86
Total rejected ballots		92	0.33	–0.20	
Turnout		27,732	29.32	–25.96	
Eligible voters		94,582			
Conservative hold		Swing		–35.96	
Source: Elections Canada

Opinion polling
Polling Firm	Last Date of Polling	Link	Cons.	Liberal	NDP	Green	Other	Margin of Error	Sample Size	Polling Method
Forum Research	November 17, 2012	PDF	35	30	8	25	2	±5.0 pp	403	IVR
Forum Research	November 12, 2012	PDF	32	30	12	23	4	±5.0 pp	376	IVR
Forum Research	October 26, 2012	PDF	48	28	8	11	5	±5.0 pp	373	IVR
Forum Research	August 14, 2012	PDF	44	21	14	12	8	±6.2 pp	250	IVR
Election	May 2, 2011		57.7	17.5	14.9	9.9				

=== Durham ===
The constituency of Durham became vacant on July 31, 2012, when former Conservative minister Bev Oda resigned from parliament.

The nomination race for the Conservative nomination in Durham was between retired Canadian Forces Captain and lawyer Erin O'Toole, former provincial Liberal Chris Topple, and Thomas Coughlan, a former aide to Finance Minister Jim Flaherty. O'Toole was acclaimed as the Conservative candidate on August 29.

Bowmanville resident Grant Humes, the Liberal candidate in the last election, ran again, while the NDP nominated Larry O'Connor, a former member of the Legislative Assembly of Ontario and former mayor of Brock.

Canadian federal by-election, November 26, 2012: Durham Resignation of Bev Oda
Party	Candidate	Votes	%	±%	Expenditures
Conservative	Erin O'Toole	17,280	50.72	−3.82	$95,331
New Democratic	Larry O'Connor	8,946	26.26	+5.16	$96,257
Liberal	Grant Humes	5,887	17.28	−0.57	$91,946
Green	Virginia Ervin	1,386	4.07	−1.32	$742
Christian Heritage	Andrew Moriarity	437	1.28	+0.49	$4,379
Online	Michael Nicula	132	0.39	–	$1,080
Total valid votes		34,068	99.66		
Total rejected ballots		115	0.34	-0.12	
Turnout		34,183	35.72	-27.50	
Eligible voters		95,710			
Conservative hold		Swing		−4.49	
Source: Elections Canada

Opinion polling
Polling Firm	Last Date of Polling	Link	Cons.	NDP	Liberal	Green	Other	Margin of Error	Sample Size	Polling Method
Forum Research	November 12, 2012	PDF	42	26	22	7	3	±4.0 pp	630	IVR
Forum Research	October 26, 2012	PDF	46	24	20	6	4	±5.0 pp	422	IVR
Election	May 2, 2011		54.6	21.1	17.9	5.4	1.1			

=== Victoria ===
On August 23, 2012, Denise Savoie, NDP MP for Victoria since 2006, announced that she would be resigning her seat effective August 31. Savoie, who held the position of Deputy Speaker of the House of Commons at the time of her announcement, cited health reasons as the key cause of her resignation.

Prominent environmental lawyer Murray Rankin was nominated as the NDP candidate on October 14. Other Victoria NDP nomination contenders were Elizabeth Cull, a former provincial finance and health minister; former Victoria school board trustee Charley Beresford, and Victoria city councilor Ben Isitt.

Dale Gann was acclaimed as the Conservative nominee.

Paul Summerville, former investment banker and previously unsuccessful New Democratic Party candidate in the Toronto riding of St. Paul's was acclaimed as the Liberal nominee on October 13. He is the great-nephew of former Toronto mayor Donald Dean Summerville.

The Greens initially nominated Trevor Moat over UVic law professor Donald Galloway on September 29. The vote was a tie and decided by a coin toss. On October 1 Moat stepped down in favour of Galloway.

A key issue during the by-election campaign was the status of the city's proposed new sewage treatment plan. Several candidates expressed opposition to the cost of the project, as well as concerns about the environmental benefits. Rankin was the only candidate who supported the plan in its current form, while Galloway argued that it was insufficient and needed to be revised, Gann supported the plan at the start of the by-election campaign but later withdrew his support, and Summerville argued that the plan was simply a billion-dollar make-work project.

Canadian federal by-election, November 26, 2012: Victoria After the resignation of Denise Savoie
Party	Candidate	Votes	%	±%	Expenditures
New Democratic	Murray Rankin	14,507	37.17	–13.61	$96,326.89
Green	Donald Galloway	13,389	34.30	+22.69	$97,263.91
Conservative	Dale Gann	5,654	14.49	–9.14	$90,730.65
Liberal	Paul Summerville	5,097	13.06	–0.92	$80,233.82
Libertarian	Art Lowe	193	0.49	–	$496.00
Christian Heritage	Philip G. Ney	192	0.49	–	$3,499.07
Total valid votes/expense limit		39,032	99.75	–	$97,992.97
Total rejected ballots		98	0.25	–0.09	
Turnout		39,130	43.03	–24.52	
Eligible voters		90,942			
New Democratic hold		Swing		–18.15	
Source: Elections Canada

Opinion polling
Polling Firm	Last Date of Polling	Link	NDP	Cons.	Liberal	Green	Other	Margin of Error	Sample Size	Polling Method
Forum Research	November 12, 2012	PDF	47	12	14	26	1	±4.0 pp	537	IVR
Forum Research	October 26, 2012	PDF	47	16	16	20	1	±6.0 pp	316	IVR
Election	May 2, 2011		50.8	23.6	14.0	11.6				

== May 13, 2013 by-election ==
=== Labrador ===
In 2011, Conservative Peter Penashue defeated sitting Liberal MP Todd Russell by 79 votes, making Labrador one of the closest races in that election. On March 14, 2013, Penashue, by then the Minister of Intergovernmental Affairs and President of the Queen's Privy Council for Canada, resigned from cabinet and from his seat with the intention to run again in a by-election. The resignation followed reports of an ineligible donation of $30,000 to his 2011 campaign. Penashue blamed the error on a campaign volunteer, paid back the money, and announced his intention to run for re-election in a press release. He was confirmed as the Conservative Party's candidate for the by-election the same day.

His Liberal opponent was Yvonne Jones, a member of the provincial legislature who was previously the province's leader of the opposition. The NDP candidate was researcher Harry Borlase, and the Libertarian candidate was Norman Andrews. The Greens did not run a candidate so as to not split the vote in an attempt to help defeat Penashue.

Canadian federal by-election, 13 May 2013: Labrador Resignation of Peter Penashue, 14 March 2013
Party	Candidate	Votes	%	±%	Expenditures
Liberal	Yvonne Jones	5,812	47.99	+8.92	$76,859.63
Conservative	Peter Penashue	3,924	32.40	−7.41	$70,866.91
New Democratic	Harry Borlase	2,324	19.19	−0.64	$81,475.53
Libertarian	Norman Andrews	50	0.41		$236.16
Total valid votes/expense limit		12,110	100.0	–	$ 89,852.84
Total rejected, declined and unmarked ballots		27	0.22	−0.26	
Turnout		12,137	59.93	+6.49	
Eligible voters		20,251			
Liberal gain from Conservative		Swing		+8.17	
Source: "By-election May 13, 2013". Elections Canada. May 13, 2013.

Opinion polling
Polling Firm	Last Date of Polling	Link	Cons.	Liberal	NDP	Other	Margin of Error	Sample Size	Polling Method
Forum Research	May 11, 2013	PDF	31	45	24	0	±5.0 pp	384	IVR
Forum Research	April 24, 2013	PDF	29	60	10	1	±5.0 pp	427	IVR
Forum Research	April 2, 2013	PDF	20	57	21	1	±6.0 pp	274	IVR
Election	May 2, 2011		39.8	39.1	19.8	1.3			

== November 25, 2013 by-elections ==
On October 20, 2013, Prime Minister Harper announced that four pending by-elections will be held on November 25.

=== Bourassa ===
On May 16, 2013, Liberal MP Denis Coderre announced he would resign his Bourassa seat on June 2, to run for Mayor of Montreal. The Chief Electoral Officer received official notification of the vacancy on June 3, 2013 and the by-election had to be called by November 30, 2013. A date of November 25, 2013 has been set for the vote.

The federal Liberals chose their candidate on September 8. Lawyer Joseph DiIorio ran for the nomination, as did Quebec MNA for Viau, Emmanuel Dubourg, who resigned his seat in the National Assembly of Quebec in order to do so. Ultimately, Dubourg won the nomination.

Larry Rousseau, regional executive vice-president for the Public Service Alliance of Canada, past NDP candidate Julie Demers, a community activist who works with co-ops, and PSAC staff rep Mario LeClerc sought the NDP nomination, losing to Juno Award-winning singer Stéphane Moraille of the band Bran Van 3000.

The Bloc Québécois selected Daniel Duranleau as its nominee.

Former NHL player and deputy leader of the Green Party Georges Laraque had been announced as the party's candidate in Bourassa, but stepped down as both the candidate and deputy leader of the Green Party when it was revealed he was facing fraud charges. Danny Polifroni, who had run for the party in Papineau in 2011, was named the Green candidate instead.

Engineer Rida Mahmoud was acclaimed as the Conservative nominee.

Canadian federal by-election, November 25, 2013: Bourassa
Party	Candidate	Votes	%	±%	Expenditures
Liberal	Emmanuel Dubourg	8,825	48.12	+7.21	$ 86,108.33
New Democratic	Stéphane Moraille	5,766	31.44	−0.84	87,240.19
Bloc Québécois	Daniel Duranleau	2,387	13.02	−3.04	81,591.19
Conservative	Rida Mahmoud	852	4.65	−4.17	21,442.95
Green	Danny Polifroni	368	2.01	+0.40	34,300.92
Rhinoceros	Serge Lavoie	140	0.76		216.08
Total valid votes/expense limit		18,338	100.0	–	$ 89,016.17
Total rejected ballots		295	1.58	−0.19	
Turnout		18,633	26.22	−28.90	
Eligible voters		69,527			
Liberal hold		Swing		+4.05	
By-election due to the resignation of Denis Coderre.
Source(s) "November 25, 2013 By-elections". Elections Canada. November 26, 2013. "November 25, 2013 By-election – Financial Reports (as reviewed)".

Opinion polling
Polling Firm	Last Date of Polling	Link	Liberal	NDP	BQ	Cons.	Green	Other	Margin of Error	Sample Size	Polling Method
Forum Research	November 22, 2013	PDF	43	31	15	8	2	1	±6.0 pp	238	IVR
Forum Research	November 14, 2013	PDF	50	21	20	3	5	1	±6.0 pp	280	IVR
Forum Research	November 5, 2013	PDF	56	19	17	5	2	1	±5.0 pp	391	IVR
Forum Research	October 18, 2013	PDF	47	18	15	7	12	1	±5.0 pp	404	IVR
Forum Research	May 17, 2013	PDF	45	21	26	3	3	1	±4.0 pp	501	IVR
Election	May 2, 2011		40.9	32.3	16.1	8.8	1.6	0.3			

=== Provencher ===
Minister of Public Safety Vic Toews resigned from cabinet and as an MP effective July 9, 2013, to spend more time with his family and join the private sector. The Chief Electoral Officer received official notification of the vacancy on July 15, 2013. On October 20, 2013, the by-election date of November 25, 2013, was announced.

Despite rumors that Steinbach MLA Kelvin Goertzen and Deputy Mayor of Steinbach Michael Zwaagstra would run for the Conservative nomination, both decided not to, and instead endorsed Steinbach Credit Union president Ted Falk, who won the nomination by acclamation.

Former parliamentary page Natalie Courcelles Beaudry, who also works in the constituency office of Dawson Trail MLA Ron Lemieux, was the only declared candidate for the NDP nomination, which was decided on October 20.

The only declared candidate for the Liberal nomination was riding president Terry Hayward, who resigned his position in order to seek the nomination. Hayward had previously run as the Liberal candidate in the 2011 federal election. Hayward was acclaimed as the Liberal nominee on September 25, 2013.

The Green Party chose former candidate Janine Gibson as its nominee.

Canadian federal by-election, November 25, 2013: Provencher Resignation of Vic Toews
Party	Candidate	Votes	%	±%	Expenditures
Conservative	Ted Falk	13,046	58.20	−12.40	$ 83,542.19
Liberal	Terry Hayward	6,711	29.94	+23.23	66,455.27
New Democratic	Natalie Courcelles Beaudry	1,843	8.22	−9.67	17,878.16
Green	Janine Gibson	817	3.64	+0.69	1,074.97
Total valid votes/expense limit		22,417	100.0	–	$ 97,453.98
Total rejected ballots		136	0.60	+0.17	
Turnout		22,553	33.85	−27.88	
Eligible voters		66,624			
Conservative hold		Swing		−17.86	
By-election due to the resignation of Vic Toews.
Source(s) "November 25, 2013 By-elections". Elections Canada. November 26, 2013. "November 25, 2013 By-election – Financial Reports".

Opinion polling
Polling Firm	Last Date of Polling	Link	Cons.	NDP	Liberal	Green	Margin of Error	Sample Size	Polling Method
Forum Research	November 22, 2013	PDF	48	6	37	8	±7.0 pp	201	IVR
Forum Research	November 14, 2013	PDF	51	10	30	8	±5.0 pp	301	IVR
Forum Research	November 5, 2013	PDF	53	8	34	5	±5.0 pp	330	IVR
Forum Research	October 18, 2013	PDF	56	9	26	9	±6.0 pp	287	IVR
Election	May 2, 2011		70.6	17.9	6.7	3.0			

=== Toronto Centre ===
On June 19, 2013, former interim Liberal Party leader Bob Rae announced he would resign his Toronto Centre seat to become a First Nations negotiator in Ontario. His resignation became effective July 31, 2013. The Chief Electoral Officer received official notification of the vacancy on August 6, 2013. On October 20, 2013, the by-election date of November 25, 2013 was announced.

Journalist, author and pundit Chrystia Freeland was nominated as the Liberal candidate defeating Todd Ross, a former senior adviser to former Ontario health minister George Smitherman and Diana Burke, former chief information security officer at Royal Bank Financial Group. On July 29, former MPP for the provincial electoral district of the same name and 2010 mayoral candidate George Smitherman announced he will not seek the Liberal nomination.

Columnist and author Linda McQuaig, is the New Democratic Party's candidate having defeated former CBC producer and MuchMusic host Jennifer Hollett, and transgender rights and social housing activist Susan Gapka for the nomination.

Lawyer Geoff Pollock was acclaimed as the Conservative Party of Canada's nominee, as no one else ran for the nomination, and former Toronto Star journalist John Deverell was named the Green Party's nominee.

The Pirate Party candidate was party leader Travis McCrea; however, on October 13, McCrea pulled out of the race and resigned from his position as party leader, citing a need to address his depression.

Canadian federal by-election, November 25, 2013: Toronto Centre (federal electoral district) Resignation of Bob Rae (July 31, 2013)
Party	Candidate	Votes	%	±%	Expenditures
Liberal	Chrystia Freeland	17,194	49.38	+8.37	$ 97,609.64
New Democratic	Linda McQuaig	12,640	36.30	+6.09	99,230.30
Conservative	Geoff Pollock	3,004	8.63	−14.01	75,557.39
Green	John Deverell	1,034	2.97	−2.05	21,521.10
Progressive Canadian	Dorian Baxter	453	1.30		–
Libertarian	Judi Falardeau	236	0.68	+0.18	–
Independent	Kevin Clarke	84	0.24		560.00
Independent	John "The Engineer" Turmel	56	0.16		–
Independent	Leslie Bory	51	0.15		633.30
Online	Michael Nicula	43	0.12		200.00
Independent	Bahman Yazdanfar	26	0.07	−0.12	1,134.60
Total valid votes/expense limit		34,821	99.49	–	$ 101,793.06
Total rejected ballots		177	0.51	+0.12	
Turnout		34,998	37.72	−25.21	
Eligible voters		92,780			
Liberal hold		Swing		+1.14	
Source(s) "November 25, 2013 By-elections Poll-by-poll results". Elections Canada. "November 25, 2013 By-election – Financial Reports".

Opinion polling
Polling Firm	Last Date of Polling	Link	Liberal	NDP	Cons.	Green	Other	Margin of Error	Sample Size	Polling Method
Forum Research	November 24, 2013	PDF	47	39	11	3	0	±4.0 pp	544	IVR
Forum Research	November 22, 2013	PDF	48	35	13	3	1	±4.0 pp	657	IVR
Forum Research	November 14, 2013	PDF	47	32	16	4	1	±3.0 pp	832	IVR
Forum Research	November 5, 2013	PDF	46	35	15	4	0	±3.0 pp	938	IVR
Forum Research	October 18, 2013	PDF	45	30	18	7	0	±3.0 pp	855	IVR
Forum Research	June 19, 2013	PDF	49	25	20	6	0	±3.0 pp	926	IVR
Election	May 2, 2011		41.0	30.2	22.6	5.0	1.1			

=== Brandon—Souris ===
On August 12, 2013, Merv Tweed, Conservative MP for Brandon—Souris, announced his resignation effective August 31. On October 20, 2013, the by-election date of November 25, 2013 was announced.

Candidates for the Conservative nomination initially included Tweed's former executive assistant Chris Kennedy, Brandon city councillor and Deputy Mayor Len Isleifson, and Arthur-Virden MLA (and Progressive Conservative candidate in 1993) Larry Maguire. Kennedy's nomination papers were rejected, while Isleifson withdrew, resulting in Maguire winning the nomination by acclamation.

Candidates for the NDP nomination were 2008 and 2011 candidate Jean Luc Bouché, and Labour Council president Cory Szczepanski. Szczepanski ultimately won the nomination.

Candidates for the Green nomination were CFIA food inspector Layne Tepleski, greenhouse owner David Neufeld, and retiree Lynwood Walker. Neufeld ultimately won the nomination.

The candidates for the Liberal nomination were Rolf Dinsdale, media executive and son of former Progressive Conservative MP Walter Dinsdale, who represented the riding from 1951–1982, and Killarney-Turtle Mountain Mayor Rick Pauls, who had initially announced that he would run as an independent. Pauls, a card-carrying Conservative, left the party citing his "disgust" with the Conservative nomination process. Former US Marine Frank Godon, who had previously run for the presidency of the Manitoba Métis Federation, also announced his candidacy, but withdrew from the nomination race on September 20. Dinsdale ultimately won the nomination, while Godon returned to the race as the candidate for the Libertarian Party of Canada.

Although public opinion polling during the campaign gave Dinsdale a significant lead over Maguire, with Dinsdale holding a 14-point lead in a Forum Research poll just a few days before the by-election, Maguire in fact narrowly won the final vote count. The discrepancy between the polls and the final result led to a renewed debate about the quality of public opinion polling in Canada.

Canadian federal by-election, November 25, 2013: Brandon—Souris
Party	Candidate	Votes	%	±%	Expenditures
Conservative	Larry Maguire	12,205	44.16	−19.57	$ 89,503.81
Liberal	Rolf Dinsdale	11,816	42.75	+37.39	76,203.47
New Democratic	Cory Szczepanski	1,996	7.22	−17.96	22,981.64
Green	David Neufeld	1,349	4.88	−0.85	7,502.04
Libertarian	Frank Godon	271	0.98	–	2,404.04
Total valid votes/expense limit		27,637	100.0	–	$ 94,534.60
Total rejected ballots		106	0.38	−0.01	
Turnout		27,743	44.81	−12.83	
Eligible voters		61,910			
Conservative hold		Swing		−28.48	
By-election due to the resignation of Merv Tweed.
Source(s) "November 25, 2013 By-elections". Elections Canada. November 26, 2013.} "November 25, 2013 By-election – Financial Reports".

Opinion polling
Polling Firm	Last Date of Polling	Link	Cons.	NDP	Green	Liberal	Other	Margin of Error	Sample Size	Polling Method
Forum Research	November 24, 2013	PDF	30	6	5	59	0	±5.0 pp	368	IVR
Forum Research	November 22, 2013	PDF	36	8	5	50	1	±5.0 pp	443	IVR
Forum Research	November 14, 2013	PDF	36	9	9	44	2	±4.0 pp	476	IVR
Forum Research	November 5, 2013	PDF	35	10	9	40	6	±4.0 pp	527	IVR
Forum Research	October 18, 2013	PDF	35	12	12	39	2	±5.0 pp	412	IVR
Election	May 2, 2011		41.0	30.2	22.6	5.0				

== June 30, 2014 by-elections ==
On May 11, 2014, Prime Minister Harper announced that four out of the five pending by-elections (all except Whitby—Oshawa) would be held on June 30.

=== Macleod ===
Conservative MP Ted Menzies announced on November 6, 2013, that he was resigning his seat that day after 9 years in parliament. He was Minister of State for Finance from 2011 until July 2, 2013, when he resigned announcing that he would not be a candidate in the next election.

Candidates for the Conservative nomination included John Barlow, who ran for the provincial PCs in Highwood during the 2012 Alberta general election, rancher and farmer Phil Rowland, former parliamentary staffer Melissa Mathieson, and businessman Scott Wagner. Barlow ultimately won the nomination.

Dustin Fuller was the only declared candidate to run for the Liberal nomination, and was thus nominated by acclamation.

Larry Ashmore was nominated by the Greens. Aileen Burke was nominated by the NDP.

David J. Reimer, interim leader of the Christian Heritage Party, was his party's candidate.

Canadian federal by-election, June 30, 2014: Macleod Resignation of Ted Menzies
Party	Candidate	Votes	%	±%	Expenditures
Conservative	John Barlow	12,616	69.16	–8.33	$66,422.40
Liberal	Dustin Fuller	3,092	16.95	+13.27	$52,667.62
Green	Larry Ashmore	991	5.43	+0.81	$166.57
Christian Heritage	David J. Reimer	774	4.24	+3.75	$13,438.51
New Democratic	Aileen Burke	770	4.22	–6.11	$399.13
Total valid votes/expense limit		18,243	99.56	–	$114,481.41
Total rejected ballots		81	0.44	+0.14	
Turnout		18,324	19.85	–40.57	
Eligible voters		92,332			
Conservative hold		Swing		–10.80	
Source: Elections Canada

Opinion polling
Polling Firm	Last Date of Polling	Link	Cons.	NDP	Green	Liberal	Other	Margin of Error	Sample Size	Polling Method
Forum Research	June 29, 2014	PDF	54	4	16	16	10	±5.0 pp	406	IVR
Forum Research	June 18, 2014	PDF	61	11	9	11	8	±4.0 pp	508	IVR
Forum Research	May 14, 2014	PDF	62	6	6	15	11	±5.0 pp	448	IVR
Election	May 2, 2011		77.5	10.3	4.6	3.7	3.9			

=== Fort McMurray—Athabasca ===
Conservative MP Brian Jean announced on January 10, 2014, that he was resigning his seat effective January 17 after a decade in parliament.

David Yurdiga, the deputy reeve for Athabasca County, and lawyer Arlan Delisle both ran for the Conservative nomination, which Yurdiga ultimately won. Other potential candidates included former Fort McMurray-Wood Buffalo MLA Guy Boutilier; former firefighter Brad Grainger; future United Conservative MLA and Conservative MP Laila Goodridge, who at the time was constituency assistant for Calgary Centre MP Joan Crockatt; and Regional Municipality of Wood Buffalo councillor Phil Meagher.

Suncor Energy employee Lori McDaniel is the NDP candidate.

Former Liberal staffer and Fort McMurray Métis Local 1935 manager Kyle Harrietha ran for the party's nomination, as did active International Union of Operating Engineers Local 955 member Chris Flett. Other potential candidates included Joanne Roberts, director of public affairs, industry relations and economic development for the Regional Municipality of Wood Buffalo; former Fort McMurray councillor Colleen Tatum; and Ron Quintal, president of Fort McKay Métis Local 63. Harrietha ultimately won the nomination.

Brian Deheer was nominated by the Green Party. Firefighter Tim Moen was the Libertarian candidate, marking the first time the party ran a candidate in the region. Moen later made national news when he created a meme featuring himself that said "I want gay married couples to defend their marijuana plants with guns." Moen felt the graphic was a perfect summary of libertarianism. Moen was later named Libertarian party leader.

Canadian federal by-election, June 30, 2014: Fort McMurray—Athabasca Resignation of Brian Jean
Party	Candidate	Votes	%	±%	Expenditures
Conservative	David Yurdiga	5,991	46.71	–25.13	$103,194.65
Liberal	Kyle Harrietha	4,529	35.31	+24.89	$103,287.86
New Democratic	Lori McDaniel	1,472	11.48	–1.77	$20,146.42
Green	Brian Deheer	453	3.53	–0.96	$1,189.37
Libertarian	Tim Moen	381	2.97	–	$3,078.39
Total valid votes		12,826	99.74		
Total rejected ballots		34	0.26	–0.20	
Turnout		12,860	14.67	–25.63	
Eligible voters		87,647			
Conservative hold		Swing		–25.01	
Source: Elections Canada

Opinion polling
Polling Firm	Last Date of Polling	Link	Cons.	NDP	Liberal	Green	Other	Margin of Error	Sample Size	Polling Method
Forum Research	June 29, 2014	PDF	33	13	41	5	8	±5.0 pp	326	IVR
Election	May 2, 2011		71.8	13.2	10.4	4.5				

=== Trinity—Spadina ===
NDP MP Olivia Chow resigned her downtown Toronto Trinity—Spadina seat on March 12, 2014, to run in the 2014 Toronto mayoral election in a bid to unseat incumbent Mayor of Toronto Rob Ford. Chow had held the seat since 2006.

Joe Cressy, director of the Stephen Lewis Foundation and a past campaign manager for Olivia Chow, sought the NDP nomination. Other potential candidates for the NDP nomination had included journalist and author Linda McQuaig (who ran as the NDP candidate in the 2013 Toronto Centre by-election), Toronto city councillor Adam Vaughan, and former city councillor Joe Pantalone. Toronto city councillor Mike Layton and former CBC producer and MuchMusic host Jennifer Hollett were also rumoured, but announced they would not run. Cressy ultimately won the nomination by acclamation.

Toronto city councillor Adam Vaughan, who had been rumoured as a possible NDP candidate, is the Liberal nominee; Ryan Davey and Christine Tabbert, who ran as the Liberal candidate in Renfrew—Nipissing—Pembroke during the 2011 election, had both entered the nomination but subsequently withdrew from the race. Labour lawyer and former Now Magazine editor Glenn Wheeler had also expressed interest in the Liberal nomination, though ultimately decided not to run. Christine Innes, who was the Liberal candidate in 2008 and 2011, as well as the wife of former MP Tony Ianno, had announced her candidacy for the Liberal nomination but was disqualified by Liberal leader Justin Trudeau after complaints that her campaign team had engaged in "intimidation and bullying" after rejecting a request that if she is elected in the by-election she commit to running in the future riding of Spadina—Fort York when Trinity—Spadina is abolished in the next general election, rather than University—Rosedale where MP Chrystia Freeland intends to stand.

Camille Labchuk was nominated by the Green Party. Benjamin Sharma was nominated by the Conservatives. Linda Groce, an anti-abortion advocate who also goes by the name Linda Gibbons, announced her intention to run as a Christian Heritage Party candidate.

Canadian federal by-election, June 30, 2014: Trinity—Spadina Resignation of Olivia Chow
Party	Candidate	Votes	%	±%
Liberal	Adam Vaughan	18,547	53.66	+30.27
New Democratic	Joe Cressy	11,802	34.14	−20.37
Conservative	Benjamin Sharma	2,022	5.85	−10.96
Green	Camille Labchuk	1,880	5.44	+1.06
Christian Heritage	Linda Groce-Gibbons	174	0.50	–
Independent	John "The Engineer" Turmel	141	0.41	–
Total valid votes/expense limit		34,566	99.68	–
Total rejected ballots		111	0.32	−0.14
Turnout		34,677	31.45	−33.50
Eligible voters		110,252		
Liberal gain from New Democratic		Swing		+25.32
By-election due to the resignation of Olivia Chow to run in the 2014 Toronto mayoral election.
Source: Elections Canada

Opinion polling
Polling Firm	Last Date of Polling	Link	NDP	Liberal	Cons.	Green	Margin of Error	Sample Size	Polling Method
Forum Research	June 29, 2014	PDF	35	45	11	9	±5.0 pp	446	IVR
Forum Research	June 18, 2014	PDF	34	52	12	2	±4.0 pp	569	IVR
Forum Research	May 14, 2014	PDF	31	54	13	2	±4.0 pp	625	IVR
Forum Research	April 21, 2014	PDF	31	52	14	2	±4.0 pp	517	IVR
Forum Research	March 13, 2014	PDF	46	32	15	6	±4.0 pp	760	IVR
Election	May 2, 2011		54.5	23.4	16.8	4.4			

=== Scarborough—Agincourt ===
On April 1, 2014, long-time Liberal Member of Parliament Jim Karygiannis announced his resignation to run in the 2014 Toronto municipal election to replace Mike Del Grande. Karygiannis had held the seat of Scarborough—Agincourt since 1988.

Arnold Chan, a lawyer and former aide to Dalton McGuinty won the Liberal nomination defeating Nikolaos Mantas, Karygiannis' former constituency assistant. Muraly Srinarayanathas had also run for the nomination, though withdrew prior to the vote.

The Conservative Party nominated Trevor Ellis as their candidate on May 3, 2014. Elizabeth Long was nominated by the NDP. Shahbaz Mir will stand for the Green Party, while Kevin Clarke will stand as an independent.

Canadian federal by-election, June 30, 2014: Scarborough—Agincourt Resignation of Jim Karygiannis
Party	Candidate	Votes	%	±%
Liberal	Arnold Chan	12,868	59.38	+13.98
Conservative	Trevor Ellis	6,344	29.27	−4.91
New Democratic	Elizabeth Ying Long	1,838	8.48	−9.62
Independent	Kevin Clarke	315	1.45	-
Green	Shahbaz Mir	307	1.42	−0.90
Total valid votes/expense limit		21,672	99.44	–
Total rejected ballots		121	0.56	−0.09
Turnout		21,793	29.43	−26.60
Eligible voters		74,062		
Liberal hold		Swing		+9.45
Source: Elections Canada

Opinion polling
Polling Firm	Last Date of Polling	Link	Liberal	Cons.	NDP	Green	Other	Margin of Error	Sample Size	Polling Method
Forum Research	June 29, 2014	PDF	48	37	10	4	1	±5.0 pp	446	IVR
Forum Research	June 18, 2014	PDF	52	36	8	2	2	±4.0 pp	562	IVR
Forum Research	May 14, 2014	PDF	46	38	9	2	5	±4.0 pp	571	IVR
Election	May 2, 2011		45.4	34.2	18.1	2.3				

== November 17, 2014 by-elections ==
On October 12, 2014, Harper announced the scheduling of two by-elections for November 17.

=== Whitby—Oshawa ===
On April 10, 2014, former Minister of Finance Jim Flaherty died in Ottawa, creating a vacancy in his riding. A by-election was called on October 12, 2014 for November 17, 2014.

Whitby mayor Pat Perkins defeated former electoral district association president David Glover for the Conservative Party nomination. Glover has since complained that senior party officials manipulated the nomination process in order to benefit Perkins. Prior to her entry into the Progressive Conservative Party of Ontario leadership election, one rumoured candidate for the nomination was Christine Elliott, Flaherty's widow and the MPP for the provincial riding of the same name.

New Democratic riding president Trish McAuliffe, a social activist who placed second to Flaherty in the 2011 federal election, was nominated once again as that party's candidate.

Celina Caesar-Chavannes, the president of ReSolve Research Solutions Inc., a clinical trials management service she co-founded with her husband in 2004, was acclaimed as the Liberal nominee on July 17, 2014.

Canadian federal by-election, November 17, 2014: Whitby—Oshawa Death of Jim Flaherty
Party	Candidate	Votes	%	±%	Expenditures
Conservative	Pat Perkins	17,082	49.31	−9.11	–
Liberal	Celina Caesar-Chavannes	14,083	40.65	+26.54	–
New Democratic	Trish McAuliffe	2,801	8.08	−14.19	–
Green	Craig Cameron	500	1.44	−3.45	–
Independent	John "The Engineer" Turmel	101	0.29		–
Independent	Josh Borenstein	77	0.22		–
Total valid votes/expense limit			100.0		
Total rejected ballots					
Turnout		34,644	31.79	−31.45	
Eligible voters		108,969		+6.87	
Conservative hold		Swing		−17.89	
Source: "By-election Results". Elections Canada. November 20, 2014.

Opinion polling
Polling Firm	Last Date of Polling	Link	Cons.	NDP	Liberal	Green	Other	Margin of Error	Sample Size	Polling Method
Forum Research	November 16, 2014	PDF	42	10	45	3	0	±3.0 pp	919	IVR
Forum Research	November 11, 2014	PDF	44	12	40	3	0	±4.0 pp	811	IVR
Forum Research	October 27, 2014	PDF	41	15	32	8	4	±3.0 pp	894	IVR
Election	May 2, 2011		58.4	22.3	14.1	4.9	0.3			

=== Yellowhead ===
On September 17, 2014, Conservative MP Rob Merrifield, first elected in 2000, resigned his seat to accept an appointment from Alberta Premier Jim Prentice as the province's envoy to the United States.

Candidates for the Conservative nomination were Yellowhead County Mayor Gerald Soroka and former Fort St. John, British Columbia Mayor Jim Eglinski. Eglinski ultimately won the nomination.

The only declared candidate for the Liberal nomination was Hinton councillor Ryan Maguhn, thus giving him the nomination by acclamation.

Canadian federal by-election, November 17, 2014: Yellowhead By-election due to the resignation of Rob Merrifield
Party	Candidate	Votes	%	±%	Expenditures
Conservative	Jim Eglinski	7,884	62.57	–14.46	$45,943.91
Liberal	Ryan Heinz Maguhn	2,518	19.98	+17.11	$29,601.51
New Democratic	Eric Rosendahl	1,203	9.55	–3.51	none listed
Independent	Dean Williams	622	4.94	–	$383.45
Libertarian	Cory Lystang	374	2.97	–	$1,345.08
Total valid votes/expense limit		12,601	99.60	–	$116,479.41
Total rejected ballots		51	0.40	+0.09	
Turnout		12,652	16.09	–39.04	
Eligible voters		78,641			
Conservative hold		Swing		–15.79	
Source: Elections Canada

Opinion polling
Polling Firm	Last Date of Polling	Link	Cons.	NDP	Liberal	Other	Margin of Error	Sample Size	Polling Method
Forum Research	November 16, 2014	PDF	51	13	24	13	±6.0 pp	311	IVR
Forum Research	November 11, 2014	PDF	62	12	16	10	±5.0 pp	406	IVR
Election	May 2, 2011		77.0	13.1	2.9	7.0			

== Cancelled October 19, 2015 by-elections ==
The following by-elections were called for October 19, 2015 which was also the expected date of the next general election; as the length of time the seats were vacant required that a byelection be called, but the length of time remaining before the general election campaign began was too short to justify actually holding one, this was a technical formality which essentially meant that a by-election was scheduled which would never actually be held. The by-elections were superseded by the general election at the dissolution of parliament on August 2, 2015 and the dropping of the federal election writ.

=== Peterborough ===
On November 5, 2014, Dean Del Mastro, the independent (formerly Conservative) MP for Peterborough, resigned his seat after being found guilty on three counts of violating election spending limits. Prior to his resignation, the House of Commons was expected to vote in favour of an NDP proposal to suspend Del Mastro without pay, effective immediately.

Retired high school teacher Dave Nickle became the first nominated candidate for Peterborough when he won the nomination to run for the NDP on March 28, 2015, however, he did not register as a candidate for the by-election. In the 2011 election, he had finished second to Conservative MP Del Mastro.

Businessman Michael Skinner was the only declared candidate for the Conservative nomination.

Candidates for the Liberal nomination included Brian Cowie, Peterborough city councillor Bob Hall, lawyer and former school board trustee Brendan Moher, and former Peterborough mayoral candidate Maryam Monsef. Trent University lecturer Cammie Jaquays and Peterborough city councillor Lesley Parnell both initially ran for nomination but withdrew, with the former withdrawing to support Monsef and the latter withdrawing to focus on her municipal duties. Monsef won the nomination and was registered as a candidate for the by-election.

The Speaker's warrant declaring the seat vacant was received by the Chief Electoral Officer on November 7, 2014. On May 3, 2015, the writ was issued for a by-election to be held October 19, 2015 which was also the anticipated date of the next general election. The by-election was superseded by the general election on August 2, 2015 when parliament was dissolved and the general election writ dropped; Monsef remained the Liberal candidate in the general election, and won the now Peterborough—Kawarthas seat on election day.

=== Sudbury ===
On December 16, 2014 NDP MP Glenn Thibeault announced that he would be resigning from the House of Commons upon being appointed the Ontario Liberal Party's candidate in a provincial by-election. His resignation became official on January 5, 2015, by which point he was sitting as an independent MP.

The only declared candidate for the NDP nomination was Paul Loewenberg, who ran for the Ontario New Democratic Party in the province's 2011 election and had initially sought the Ontario NDP nomination for the provincial by-election before choosing to run federally.

The Conservatives nominated 2011 candidate Fred Slade for the next general election, however he did not register as a candidate in the by-election.

Candidates for the Liberal nomination were lawyer Paul Lefebvre and former Greater Sudbury Mayor Marianne Matichuk. The nomination was ultimately won by Lefebvre.

Running for the Green nomination was Laurentian University economics professor David Robinson.

The Speaker's warrant declaring the seat vacant was received by the Chief Electoral Officer on January 9, 2015. On May 3, 2015, the writ was issued for a by-election to be held October 19, 2015 which was also the anticipated date of the next general election. The by-election was superseded by the general election on August 2, 2015 when parliament was dissolved and the general election writ was dropped.

Opinion polling
Polling Firm	Last Date of Polling	Link	NDP	Cons.	Liberal	Green	Other	Margin of Error	Sample Size	Polling Method
Mainstreet Technologies	December 21, 2014	HTML	29	22	46	3		±3.98 pp	602	IVR
Election	May 2, 2011		49.9	28.4	18.0	3.0	0.8			

=== Ottawa West—Nepean ===
On February 3, 2015, Foreign Minister John Baird resigned from cabinet and announced that he would be resigning his seat in the House of Commons as the Conservative MP for Ottawa West—Nepean. His resignation as an MP took effect on March 16, 2015. Under the Canada Elections Act, a by-election must be announced within six months of a seat becoming vacant, but the date of the by-election itself can be up to a year after the writ is dropped.

Candidates for the Conservative nomination included Ottawa police officer Abdul Abdi, restaurant owner Scott Singer, and Andy Wang, a staffer in Conservative MP Pierre Poilievre's constituency office.

The nominated Liberal candidate was Anita Vandenbeld, a former staffer on Parliament Hill and the Liberal candidate in 2011. Vandenbeld defeated former Ottawa Centre candidate Richard Mahoney and former Liberal leadership candidate Deborah Coyne for the nomination, held before Baird's resignation. However, she is not currently registered as a candidate in the by-election.

As of July 19, 2015, the only registered candidates were Karim Rizkallah of the Bridge Party of Canada and Rod Taylor of the Christian Heritage Party.

The Speaker's warrant declaring the seat vacant was received by the Chief Electoral Officer on March 24, 2015. On May 3, 2015, the writ was issued for a by-election to be held October 19, 2015 which was also the anticipated date of the next general election. The by-election was superseded by the general election on August 2, 2015 when parliament was dissolved and the general election writ was dropped.

== Cancelled pending by-elections ==
=== Barrie ===
The seat of Barrie became vacant on May 13, 2015 following the resignation of Patrick Brown upon his election as leader of the Progressive Conservative Party of Ontario. The Speaker's warrant informing Elections Canada of the vacancy was officially received on May 14, 2015 and the last day an announcement could have been made setting a by-election date is November 10, 2015. Parliament was dissolved on August 2, 2015, without a by-election having been called, with the general election called for October 19, 2015, by which point the riding had been split into Barrie—Innisfil (where Brown had initially been nominated to run for re-election) and Barrie—Springwater—Oro-Medonte.

== See also ==
- List of federal by-elections in Canada
