= Niton Junction =

- Hamlet
- Location of Niton Junction in Alberta
- Coordinates: 53.6219°N 115.7697°W
- Country: Canada
- Province: Alberta
- Census division: No. 14
- Municipal district: Yellowhead County

Government
  - Type: Unincorporated
  - Mayor: Jim Eglinski
  - Governing body: Yellowhead County Council: Shawn Brian Berry; Sandra Cherniawsky; Anthony Giezen; Dawn Mitchell; Fred Priestley-Wright; David Russell; William Velichko; Jack Williams

Area (2021)
  - Land: 1.04 km^{2} (0.40 sq mi)
- Elevation: 845 m (2,772 ft)

Population (2021)
  - Total: 88
  - Density: 84.7/km^{2} (219/sq mi)
- Time zone: UTC−06:00 (Alberta Time)

Niton Junction is a hamlet in west-central Alberta, Canada within Yellowhead County. It is located on the Yellowhead Highway (Highway 16) approximately 45 kilometres (28 mi) east of Edson and 150 kilometres (93 mi) west of Edmonton. It is east of the Yellowhead Highway's junction with Highway 32 and west of Chip Lake. Niton Junction has an elevation of 845 metres (2,772 ft).

Statistics Canada recognizes Niton Junction as a designated place.

The hamlet is located in Census Division No. 14 and in the federal riding of Yellowhead.

== Demographics ==
Population history of Niton Junction
Year	Pop.	±%
1961	23	—
1966	77	+234.8%
1971	68	−11.7%
1976	55	−19.1%
1981	72	+30.9%
1986	99	+37.5%
1991	79	−20.2%
1991A	80	+1.3%
1996	85	+6.2%
2001	85	+0.0%
2006	119	+40.0%
2011	26	−78.2%
2016	38	+46.2%
2016R	70	+84.2%
2021	88	+25.7%
Source: Statistics Canada

In the 2021 Census of Population conducted by Statistics Canada, Niton Junction had a population of 88 living in 43 of its 49 total private dwellings, a change of 25.7% from its 2016 population of 70. With a land area of 1.04 km^{2} (0.40 sq mi), it had a population density of 84.6/km^{2} (219.2/sq mi) in 2021.

As a designated place in the 2016 Census of Population conducted by Statistics Canada, Niton Junction had a population of 38 living in 15 of its 15 total private dwellings, a change of 46.2% from its 2011 population of 26. With a land area of 0.91 km^{2} (0.35 sq mi), it had a population density of 41.8/km^{2} (108.2/sq mi) in 2016.

== See also ==
- List of communities in Alberta
- List of designated places in Alberta
- List of hamlets in Alberta
