= Eric Rosendahl =

Canadian politician

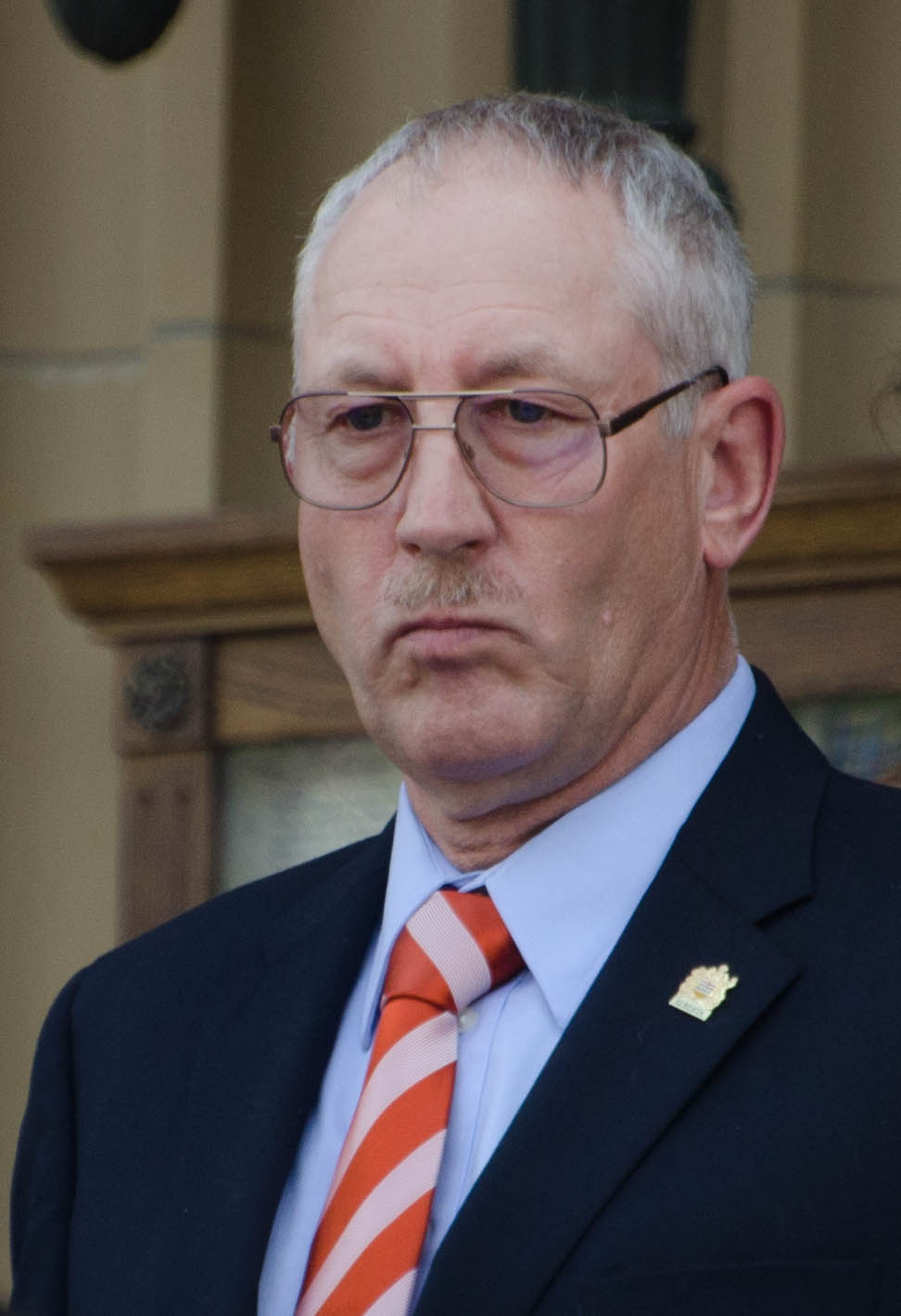
- Rosendahl in 2015

Member of the Legislative Assembly of Alberta for West Yellowhead
- In office May 5, 2015 – March 19, 2019
- Preceded by: Robin Campbell
- Succeeded by: Martin Long

Personal details
- Born: 1952 or 1953 (age 72–73) Turtleford, Saskatchewan
- Party: Alberta New Democratic Party
- Occupation: Former steam engineer, bus driver

Eric B. Rosendahl (born 1952 or 1953) is a Canadian politician who was elected in the 2015 Alberta general election to the Legislative Assembly of Alberta representing the electoral district of West Yellowhead. He has been President of the Yellowhead Labour Council. He was also the NDP candidate for the federal Yellowhead riding during the 2014 by-election.

== Electoral history ==
=== 2015 Alberta general election ===
2015 Alberta general election: West Yellowhead
Party	Candidate	Votes	%	±%	
New Democratic	Eric Rosendahl	4,135	38.92%	30.84%	
Progressive Conservative	Robin Campbell	3,433	32.32%	-12.27%	
Wildrose	Stuart Taylor	3,055	28.76%	1.48%	
Total		10,623	–turnout	23,063	46.29%
New Democratic gain from Progressive Conservative		Swing		-5.35%	
Source(s) Source: "85 - West Yellowhead, 2015 Alberta general election". officialresults.elections.ab.ca. Elections Alberta. Chief Electoral Officer (2016). 2015 General Election. A Report of the Chief Electoral Officer (PDF) (Report). Edmonton, Alta.: Elections Alberta.

=== 2014 federal by-election ===
Canadian federal by-election, November 17, 2014: Yellowhead By-election due to the resignation of Rob Merrifield
Party	Candidate	Votes	%	±%	Expenditures
Conservative	Jim Eglinski	7,884	62.57	−14.46	–
Liberal	Ryan Heinz Maguhn	2,518	19.98	+17.11	–
New Democratic	Eric Rosendahl	1,203	9.55	−3.51	–
Independent	Dean Williams	622	4.94		–
Libertarian	Cory Lystang	374	2.97		–
Total valid votes/expense limit			100.0		–
Total rejected ballots					
Turnout		12,601	16.06	−40.10	
Eligible voters		78,481		+6.00	
Conservative hold		Swing		−15.79	
Source(s) "By-election Results". Elections Canada. November 17, 2014.
