= Robin Campbell =

Robin Campbell may refer to:

- Robin Campbell (runner) (born 1959), American athlete
- Robin Campbell (politician) (born 1955), politician in Alberta, Canada
- Robin Campbell (musician), musician with UB40
