= Duco Van Binsbergen =

Canadian politician

MLA for West Yellowhead
- In office 1993–1997
- Preceded by: Jerry Doyle
- Succeeded by: Ivan Strang

Personal details
- Born: December 17, 1936
- Died: April 4, 2009 (aged 72) Halifax, Nova Scotia
- Party: Liberal

Duco Van Binsbergen (December 17, 1936 – April 4, 2009) was a provincial level politician from Alberta, Canada. He served as a member of the Legislative Assembly of Alberta from 1993 to 1997.

== Political career ==
Van Binsbergen was elected to the Alberta Legislature in the 1993 Alberta general election. He defeated incumbent New Democrat Member Jerry Doyle to pick up the seat for the Liberals. He ran for a second term in office in the 1997 Alberta general election but was defeated by Progressive Conservative candidate Ivan Strang.

== Late life ==
Van Binsbergen sang as a Baritone in the Foothills Male Chorus after he retired from politics. His family moved to the Annapolis Royal area in Nova Scotia in 2007, and he died at the Halifax Infirmary on April 4, 2009.
