= West Yellowhead =

Provincial electoral district in Alberta, Canada

Coordinates: 53.6°N 117.8°W

Alberta electoral district
- West Yellowhead within Alberta, 2017 boundaries

Provincial electoral district
- Legislature: Legislative Assembly of Alberta
MLA
Martin Long
United Conservative
- District created: 1986
- First contested: 1986
- Last contested: 2023

West Yellowhead is a provincial electoral district in Alberta, Canada. The district is one of 87 current ridings mandated to return a single member to the Legislative Assembly of Alberta using the first past the post method of voting.

The district in its early history was a swing riding, changing party hands often. More recently, support has gone to electing candidates from the Progressive Conservatives, who have held the district with sizable majorities since 1997. The current representative is UCP Martin Long who was first elected in the 2019 provincial election.

== Geography ==
West Yellowhead is a predominantly rural riding located in northwest and west-central Alberta. The landscape includes the Rocky Mountains of Jasper National Park, their foothills, and large expanses of boreal forest, some of which has been cleared for agriculture.

There are no cities in the riding. The only urban municipalities within its boundaries are three large towns: Edson, Hinton, and Whitecourt. Other population centres include Jasper, incorporated as a specialized municipality, and Grande Cache, a former town that became a hamlet in 2019.

West Yellowhead also includes the entirety of three rural municipalities (Improvement District No. 12, Improvement District No. 25, and Yellowhead County) and parts of two others (the Municipal District of Greenview No. 16 and Woodlands County).

No First Nation band governments are based in the riding. However, the riding does includes three reserves (Alexis Cardinal River Indian Reserve 234, Alexis Elk River Indian Reserve 233, and Alexis Whitecourt Indian Reserve 232) that are associated with the Alexis Nakota Sioux Nation, a signatory of Treaty 6. The unrecognized Aseniwuche Winewak Nation also has several settlements in the riding, in the Grande Cache area.

West Yellowhead borders seven other electoral districts: Grande Prairie-Wapiti and Central Peace-Notley to the north, Athabasca-Barrhead-Westlock to the northeast, Lac Ste. Anne-Parkland and Drayton Valley-Devon to the east, and Rimbey-Rocky Mountain House-Sundre and Banff-Kananaskis to the south. The riding's western boundary is the Alberta-British Columbia border.

== History ==
The district was created in the 1986 boundary redistribution from most of the old Edson electoral district. Since it was created, the district has remained almost unchanged. The 2010 boundary redistribution did not change the riding from 2003.

=== Boundary history ===
81 West Yellowhead 2003 boundaries
Bordering districts
North	East	West	South
Grande Prairie-Smoky and Grande Prairie-Wapiti	Drayton Valley-Calmar and Whitecourt-Ste. Anne	British Columbia boundary	Rocky Mountain House
riding map goes here			
Legal description from the Statutes of Alberta 2003, Electoral Divisions Act.
Starting at the intersection of the west boundary of the Province and the north boundary of Twp. 58; then 1. east along the north boundary to the left bank of the Smoky River; 2. downstream along the left bank to its most westerly intersection with the north boundary of Twp. 62; 3. east along the north boundary to the east boundary of Rge. 25 W5; 4. south along the east boundary to the right bank of the Berland River; 5. downstream along the right bank of the Berland River to the right bank of the Athabasca River; 6. downstream along the right bank of the Athabasca River to the east boundary of Rge. 19 W5; 7. south along the east boundary to the north boundary of Twp. 58; 8. east along the north boundary to the east boundary of Rge. 18 W5; 9. south along the east boundary to the north boundary of Twp. 57; 10. east along the north boundary to the east boundary of Rge. 16 W5; 11. south along the east boundary to the north boundary of Twp. 47; 12. east along the north boundary to the east boundary of Rge. 15 W5; 13. south along the east boundary to the north boundary of Twp. 44; 14. west along the north boundary to the east boundary of Rge. 19 W5; 15. south along the east boundary to the north boundary of Twp. 43; 16. west along the north boundary to the right bank of the Brazeau River; 17. upstream along the right bank to the Jasper National Park boundary; 18. in a generally southwesterly direction along the park boundary to the Alberta-British Columbia boundary; 19. in a generally northwesterly direction along the boundary to the starting point.
Note:

85 West Yellowhead 2010 boundaries
Bordering districts
North	East	West	South
Grande Prairie-Smoky and Grande Prairie-Wapiti	Drayton Valley-Devon and Whitecourt-Ste. Anne	British Columbia boundary	Rimbey-Rocky Mountain House-Sundre
Legal description from the Statutes of Alberta 2010, Electoral Divisions Act.
Legal description from the Statutes of Alberta 2003, Electoral Divisions Act.
Note: The district remained unchanged in 2010.

=== Electoral history ===
Members of the Legislative Assembly for West Yellowhead
Assembly	Years	Member	Party
See: Edson 1913-1986
21st	1986–1989	Ian Reid	Progressive Conservative
22nd	1989–1993	Jerry Doyle	New Democrat
23rd	1993–1997	Duco Van Binsbergen	Liberal
24th	1997–2001	Ivan Strang	Progressive Conservative
25th	2001–2004	Ivan Strang	Progressive Conservative
26th	2004–2008	Ivan Strang	Progressive Conservative
27th	2008–2012	Robin Campbell	Progressive Conservative
28th	2012–2015	Robin Campbell	Progressive Conservative
29th	2015–2019	Eric Rosendahl	New Democrat
30th	2019–2023	Martin Long	United Conservative
31st	2023–present	Martin Long	United Conservative

The electoral district was created in the 1986 general election. The first election held that year saw a tight race between incumbent Progressive Conservative MLA Ian Reid who had previously represented the Edson electoral district and New Democrat candidate Phil Oakes. Reid barely hung onto win to pick up the new district for his party.

The 1989 election would see Reid defeated by New Democrat candidate Jerry Doyle in another close race. Doyle would only last a single term in office as he was defeated by Liberal candidate Duco Van Binsbergen in the 1993 general election.

The Progressive Conservatives would regain the seat in the 1997 general election as candidate Ivan Strang defeated Van Binsbergen. Strang was re-elected in the 2001 election with a solid majority. He won a third term in the 2004 general election taking less than half the popular vote but winning a comfortable plurality over the opposition candidates which polled an evenly dived vote. He would retire from office in 2008.

Progressive Conservative Robin Campbell was elected in 2008 and re-elected in 2012. Campbell lost to Eric Rosendahl of the New Democratic Party when the NDP were voted into government on May 4, 2015.

== Legislative election results ==
=== 2023 ===
2023 Alberta general election
Party	Candidate	Votes	%	±%
United Conservative	Martin Long	14,456	71.80	+3.48
New Democratic	Fred Kreiner	5,679	28.20	+7.72
Total		20,135	99.23	–
Rejected and declined		156	0.77	
Turnout		20,291	55.37	
Eligible voters		36,648		
United Conservative hold		Swing		-2.12
Source(s) Source: Elections Alberta

=== 2019 ===
2019 Alberta general election
Party	Candidate	Votes	%	±%
United Conservative	Martin Long	16,381	68.31%	7.23%
New Democratic	Paula Cackett	4,912	20.48%	-18.44%
Alberta Party	Kristie Gomuwka	2,073	8.65%	–
Alberta Advantage	Paul Lupyczuk	261	1.09%	–
Alberta Independence	Travis Poirier	229	0.96%	–
Independent	David Pearce	123	0.51%	–
Total		23,979	–	–
Rejected, spoiled and declined		111	50	9
Eligible electors / turnout		35,546	67.80%	21.51%
United Conservative gain from New Democratic		Swing		20.61%
Source(s) Source: "87 - West Yellowhead, 2019 Alberta general election". officialresults.elections.ab.ca. Elections Alberta. Alberta. Chief Electoral Officer (2019). 2019 General Election. A Report of the Chief Electoral Officer. Volume II (PDF) (Report). Vol. 2. Edmonton, Alta.: Elections Alberta. pp. 427–433. ISBN 978-1-988620-12-1.

=== 2015 ===
2015 Alberta general election
Party	Candidate	Votes	%	±%
New Democratic	Eric Rosendahl	4,135	38.92%	30.84%
Progressive Conservative	Robin Campbell	3,433	32.32%	-12.27%
Wildrose	Stuart Taylor	3,055	28.76%	1.48%
Total		10,623	–	–
Rejected, spoiled and declined		40	9	12
Eligible electors / turnout		23,063	46.29%	-1.08%
New Democratic gain from Progressive Conservative		Swing		-5.35%
Source(s) Source: "85 - West Yellowhead, 2015 Alberta general election". officialresults.elections.ab.ca. Elections Alberta. Chief Electoral Officer (2016). 2015 General Election. A Report of the Chief Electoral Officer (PDF) (Report). Edmonton, Alta.: Elections Alberta.

=== 2012 ===
2012 Alberta general election
Party	Candidate	Votes	%	±%
Progressive Conservative	Robin Campbell	4,393	44.59%	-9.24%
Wildrose Alliance	Stuart Taylor	2,688	27.28%	23.11%
Alberta Party	Glenn Taylor	1,668	16.93%	–
New Democratic	Barry Madsen	797	8.09%	-5.40%
Liberal	Michael Martyna	307	3.12%	-21.61%
Total		9,853	–	–
Rejected, spoiled and declined		51	25	5
Eligible electors / turnout		20,919	47.37%	9.62%
Progressive Conservative hold		Swing		-5.90%
Source(s) Source: "85 - West Yellowhead, 2012 Alberta general election". officialresults.elections.ab.ca. Elections Alberta. Chief Electoral Officer (2012). The Report of the Chief Electoral Officer on the 2011 Provincial Enumeration and Monday, April 23, 2012 Provincial General Election of the Twenty-eighth Legislative Assembly (PDF) (Report). Edmonton, Alta.: Elections Alberta. Archived (PDF) from the original on May 6, 2021.

=== 2008 ===
2008 Alberta general election
Party	Candidate	Votes	%	±%
Progressive Conservative	Robin Campbell	4,206	53.83%	8.10%
Liberal	Lisa Higgerty	1,932	24.72%	4.43%
New Democratic	Ken Kuzminski	1,054	13.49%	-8.09%
Wildrose Alliance	Earle Cunningham	326	4.17%	-4.05%
Green	Scott Pickett	296	3.79%	-0.39%
Total		7,814	–	–
Rejected, spoiled and declined		26	5	1
Eligible electors / turnout		20,770	37.75%	-8.76%
Progressive Conservative hold		Swing		2.48%
Source(s) Source: "81 - West Yellowhead, 2008 Alberta general election". officialresults.elections.ab.ca. Elections Alberta. Chief Electoral Officer (2008). The Report on the March 3, 2008 Provincial General Election of the Twenty-Seventh Legislative Assembly (Report). Edmonton, Alta.: Elections Alberta. pp. 558–563.

=== 2004 ===
2004 Alberta general election
Party	Candidate	Votes	%	±%
Progressive Conservative	Ivan J. Strang	3,753	45.72%	-13.42%
New Democratic	Barry Madsen	1,771	21.58%	13.36%
Liberal	Rob Jolly	1,666	20.30%	-12.34%
Alberta Alliance	Earle Cunningham	675	8.22%	–
Green	Monika Schaefer	343	4.18%	–
Total		8,208	–	–
Rejected, spoiled and declined		27	16	1
Eligible electors / Turnout		17,706	46.52%	-4.82%
Progressive Conservative hold		Swing		-1.18%
Source(s) Source: "00 - West Yellowhead, 2004 Alberta general election". officialresults.elections.ab.ca. Elections Alberta. Alberta. Chief Electoral Officer (2005). Report of the Chief Electoral Officer on the General Enumeration and General Election of the Twenty-sixth Legislative Assembly (Report). Edmonton: Alberta Legislative Assembly, Office of the Chief Electoral Officer.

=== 2001 ===
2001 Alberta general election
Party	Candidate	Votes	%	±%
Progressive Conservative	Ivan J. Strang	5,763	59.14%	17.10%
Liberal	Lyle Benson	3,180	32.64%	-2.84%
New Democratic	Noel Lapierre	801	8.22%	-11.69%
Total		9,744	–	–
Rejected, spoiled and declined		6	27	1
Eligible electors / Turnout		18,995	51.33%	-4.57%
Progressive Conservative hold		Swing		9.97%
Source(s) Source: "West Yellowhead Official Results 2001 Alberta general election". Alberta Heritage Community Foundation. Alberta. Chief Electoral Officer (2001). The report of the Chief Electoral Officer on the 2000 provincial confirmation process and Monday, March 12, 2001, Provincial General Election of the twenty-fifth Legislative Assembly. Edmonton: Alberta Legislative Assembly, Office of the Chief Electoral Officer.

=== 1997 ===
1997 Alberta general election
Party	Candidate	Votes	%	±%
Progressive Conservative	Ivan J. Strang	4,498	42.05%	9.77%
Liberal	Duco Van Binsbergen	3,795	35.47%	-1.60%
New Democratic	Glenn Taylor	2,130	19.91%	-3.43%
Social Credit	John Ahlstrom	275	2.57%	-3.49%
Total		10,698	–	–
Rejected, spoiled and declined		19	19	3
Eligible electors / Turnout		19,176	55.90%	0.46%
Progressive Conservative gain from Liberal		Swing		0.89%
Source(s) Source: "West Yellowhead Official Results 1997 Alberta general election". Alberta Heritage Community Foundation. Alberta. Chief Electoral Officer (1997). Report of the Chief Electoral Officer, November, 1996 general enumeration and Tuesday, March 11, 1997 general election Twenty-fourth Legislative Assembly. Edmonton: Alberta Legislative Assembly, Office of the Chief Electoral Officer.

=== 1993 ===
1993 Alberta general election
Party	Candidate	Votes	%	±%
Liberal	Duco Van Binsbergen	3,562	37.07%	24.01%
Progressive Conservative	Fiona Fowler Cleary	3,101	32.28%	-4.56%
New Democratic	Jerry J. Doyle	2,243	23.35%	-23.91%
Social Credit	Garry M. Klewchuk	582	6.06%	–
Greens	Mario Houle	120	1.25%	–
Total		9,608	–	–
Rejected, spoiled and declined		21	–	–
Eligible electors / Turnout		17,367	55.44%	3.29%
Liberal gain from New Democratic		Swing		-2.81%
Source(s) Source: "West Yellowhead Official Results 1993 Alberta general election". Alberta Heritage Community Foundation.

=== 1989 ===
1989 Alberta general election
Party	Candidate	Votes	%	±%
New Democratic	Jerry J. Doyle	3,989	47.26%	5.22%
Progressive Conservative	Ian Reid	3,109	36.83%	-8.03%
Liberal	Sharron Johnstone	1,103	13.07%	2.59%
Independent	Harvey Ball	240	2.84%	–
Total		8,441	–	–
Rejected, spoiled and declined		25	–	–
Eligible electors / Turnout		16,234	52.15%	6.96%
New Democratic gain from Progressive Conservative		Swing		3.80%
Source(s) Source: "West Yellowhead Official Results 1989 Alberta general election". Alberta Heritage Community Foundation.

=== 1986 ===
1986 Alberta general election
Party	Candidate	Votes	%	±%
Progressive Conservative	Ian Reid	3,207	44.87%	–
New Democratic	Phil Oakes	3,005	42.04%	–
Liberal	Laurie Switzer	749	10.48%	–
Western Canada Concept	Lorraine Oberg	187	2.62%	–
Total		7,148	–	–
Rejected, spoiled and declined		21	–	–
Eligible electors / Turnout		15,863	45.19%	–
Progressive Conservative pickup new district.				
Source(s) Source: "West Yellowhead Official Results 1986 Alberta general election". Alberta Heritage Community Foundation.

== Senate nominee election results ==
=== 2004 ===
2004 Senate nominee election results: West Yellowhead				Turnout 46.49%	
Affiliation	Candidate	Votes	% votes	% ballots	Rank
Progressive Conservative	Cliff Breitkreuz	4,004	20.24%	59.57%	3
Progressive Conservative	Betty Unger	2,758	13.94%	41.03%	2
Progressive Conservative	Bert Brown	2,125	10.74%	31.61%	1
Independent	Link Byfield	2,025	10.23%	30.13%	4
Progressive Conservative	David Usherwood	1,628	8.23%	24.22%	6
Alberta Alliance	Michael Roth	1,540	7.78%	22.91%	7
Progressive Conservative	Jim Silye	1,506	7.61%	22.40%	5
Alberta Alliance	Gary Horan	1,434	7.25%	21.33%	10
Alberta Alliance	Vance Gough	1,415	7.15%	21.05%	8
Independent	Tom Sindlinger	1,352	6.83%	20.11%	9
Total votes		19,787	100%		
Total ballots		6,722	2.94 votes per ballot		
Rejected, spoiled and declined		1,510			

Voters had the option of selecting four candidates on the ballot

== Student vote results ==
=== 2004 ===
Participating schools
Crescent Valley School
Ecole Mountain View School
Gerard Redmond Community Catholic School
Harry Collinge High School
Holy Redeemer Catholic Jr/Sr High School
Parkland Composite High School
Pine Grove Middle School
Yellowhead Koinonia Christian School

On November 19, 2004, a student vote was conducted at participating Alberta schools to parallel the 2004 Alberta general election results. The vote was designed to educate students and simulate the electoral process for persons who have not yet reached the legal majority. The vote was conducted in 80 of the 83 provincial electoral districts with students voting for actual election candidates. Schools with a large student body that reside in another electoral district had the option to vote for candidates outside of the electoral district then where they were physically located.

2004 Alberta student vote results
Affiliation	Candidate	Votes	%
Progressive Conservative	Ivan Strang	593	32.91%
NDP	Barry Madsen	448	24.86%
Liberal	Rob Jolly	341	18.92%
Alberta Alliance	Earle Cunningham	271	15.04%
Green	Monika Schaefer	149	8.27%
Total		1,802	100%
Rejected, spoiled and declined		62	

=== 2012 ===
2012 Alberta student vote results
Affiliation	Candidate	Votes	%
Alberta Party	Glenn Taylor	224	34.30%
Progressive Conservative	Robin Campbell	221	33.84%
Wildrose	Stuart Taylor	102	15.62%
NDP	Barry Madsen	57	8.73%
Liberal	Michael Martyna	49	7.50%
Total		653	100%

== See also ==
- List of Alberta provincial electoral districts
- Canadian provincial electoral districts
