= William Stevenson (Canadian politician) =

Canadian politician

William Stevenson MP

Member of Parliament for Yellowhead
- Incumbent
- Assumed office April 28, 2025
- Preceded by: Gerald Soroka

Personal details
- Party: Conservative

William Stevenson MP is a Canadian politician from the Conservative Party of Canada. He was elected Member of Parliament for Yellowhead in the 2025 Canadian federal election. He is a chartered accountant and a former financial agent for MPs. He is a fourth generation Albertan residing on a farm in rural Alberta. He beat incumbent Conservative MP Gerald Soroka for the nomination. He was elected vice chair of the Standing Joint Committee on the Library of Parliament in the 45th Canadian Parliament in 2025.

At the time of the 2025 Canadian federal election, he lived in Mountain View County.

== Electoral record ==
2025 Canadian federal election: Yellowhead
Party	Candidate	Votes	%	±%	Expenditures
Conservative	William Stevenson	47,863	69.08	+8.85	$76,397.22
Liberal	Michael Fark	17,469	25.21	+14.59	$50,817.32
New Democratic	Avni Soma	2,753	3.97	–10.70	$23,897.14
People's	Vicky Bayford	952	1.37	–7.88	$2,409.10
Christian Heritage	Dale Heath	253	0.37	–	$2,052.97
Total valid votes/expense limit		69,290	99.31	–	$171,596.37
Total rejected ballots		484	0.69	+0.12	
Turnout		69,774	74.15	+6.22	
Eligible voters		94,098			
Conservative hold		Swing		–	
Source: Elections Canada
