= Ivan Strang =

Canadian politician

MLA for West Yellowhead
- In office 1997–2008
- Preceded by: Duco Van Binsbergen
- Succeeded by: Robin Campbell

Personal details
- Born: June 1, 1940 (age 86) Winnipeg, Manitoba
- Party: Progressive Conservative

Ivan Strang (born June 1, 1940) is a former Progressive Conservative Member of the Legislative Assembly of Alberta for West Yellowhead. He served as a member in the Alberta Legislature from 1997 to 2008.

== Political career ==
Ivan Strang ran for a seat for the first time in the 1997 Alberta general election. He won by a comfortable margin over Liberal incumbent Duco Van Binsbergen to pick up the electoral district of West Yellowhead for the Progressive Conservatives for the first time since they lost it in 1989.

Strang won his second term in office with a larger plurality in the 2001 Alberta general election. He defeated two other candidates in that election.

He ran for his third and final term in office in the 2004 Alberta general election. His popular vote dropped significantly but the opposition vote was divided among four other candidates. He would retire from politics at the dissolution of the legislature in 2008.
