= Ian Reid (Alberta politician) =

Canadian politician

Ian Wilson Carlyle Reid

Member of the Legislative Assembly of Alberta
- In office 1979–1986
- Preceded by: Robert Dowling
- Succeeded by: District Abolished
- Constituency: Edson
- In office 1986–1989
- Preceded by: New District
- Succeeded by: Jerry Doyle
- Constituency: West Yellowhead

Solicitor General
- In office December 20, 1983 – May 1986
- Preceded by: Graham Harle
- Succeeded by: Ken Rostad

Minister of Labour
- In office May 1986 – September 8, 1988
- Preceded by: Leslie Young
- Succeeded by: Rick Orman

Minister of the Environment
- In office September 8, 1988 – March 1989
- Preceded by: Ken Kowalski
- Succeeded by: Ralph Klein

Personal details
- Born: May 27, 1931 Bradford, England
- Died: January 18, 2016 (aged 84) Alberta, Canada
- Party: Progressive Conservative

Ian Wilson Carlyle Reid (May 27, 1931 – January 18, 2016) was a provincial level politician from Alberta, Canada. He served as a member of the Legislative Assembly of Alberta from 1979 to 1989. During his time in office, Reid served various portfolios in the Executive Council of Alberta under the Governments of Peter Lougheed and Don Getty from 1983 to 1989.

== Political career ==
Reid ran for a seat to the Alberta Legislature for the first time in the 1979 Alberta general election. He won the electoral district of Edson by a wide margin defeating three other candidates to hold it for the governing Progressive Conservative party. He served his first term in the back benches.

Reid won his second term in office in the 1982 Alberta general election. A year after the election on December 20, 1983, Premier Peter Lougheed appointed Reid to his first position in the Alberta Executive Council as Solicitor General. He held that position almost all the way through his second term. After Premier Don Getty came to power Reid was promoted to Minister of Labour. Prior to his promotion to Cabinet Reid served as whip for the Government caucus.

Reid won his third term in the 1986 Alberta general election—this time in the new electoral district of West Yellowhead after Edson was abolished. In 1988 his portfolio was changed to Minister of the Environment.

He ran in the 1989 Alberta general election but was defeated in a contested race by New Democratic Party candidate Jerry Doyle. The defeat was considered an upset to Reid's cabinet post. He did not run in any subsequent elections.
