= Jerry Doyle (politician) =

Canadian politician

Jerry J. Doyle

MLA for West Yellowhead
- In office 1986–1989
- Preceded by: Ian Reid
- Succeeded by: Duco Van Binsbergen

Personal details
- Born: August 1, 1941 (age 84) Rogersville, New Brunswick
- Party: Alberta NDP

Jerry J. Doyle (born August 1, 1941) is a former provincial level politician from Alberta, Canada. He served as a member of the Legislative Assembly of Alberta from 1989 to 1993 sitting with the opposition New Democratic Party caucus.

== Political career ==
Doyle ran as a candidate for the New Democrats in the 1989 Alberta general election. He defeated Progressive Conservative incumbent Ian Reid to pick up the West Yellowhead electoral district for his party. He ran for a second term in the 1993 Alberta general election but was defeated by Liberal candidate Duco Van Binsbergen.
