= Pinedale, Alberta =

Pinedale
- Locality
- Location of Pinedale in Alberta
- Coordinates: 53°36′01″N 116°08′45″W
- Country: Canada
- Province: Alberta
- Census division: No. 14
- Municipal district: Yellowhead County
- Hamlet designation: August 26, 1987
- Hamlet repeal: February 26, 2019
- Time zone: UTC−06:00 (Alberta Time)

Pinedale is a locality in west-central Alberta, Canada within Yellowhead County. It is located approximately 15 km (9.3 mi) east of Edson. It was designated a hamlet between 1987 and 2019.

== History ==
Pinedale was designated a hamlet by the Government of Alberta on August 26, 1987 for the purpose of accessing funding for the installation of a communal low pressure sewage system. Yellowhead County repealed the hamlet designation on February 26, 2019.

== See also ==
- List of communities in Alberta
