= Yellowhead (electoral district) =

Federal electoral district in Alberta, Canada

Coordinates: 53.3°N 116.4°W

Alberta electoral district
- Interactive map of riding boundaries from the 2025 federal election

Federal electoral district
- Legislature: House of Commons
MP
William Stevenson
Conservative
- District created: 1976
- First contested: 1979
- Last contested: 2025
- District webpage: profile, map

Demographics
- Population (2011): 98,855
- Electors (2019): 74,005
- Area (km²): 76,127
- Pop. density (per km²): 1.3
- Census division(s): Division No. 9, Division No. 11, Division No. 13, Division No. 14
- Census subdivision(s): Rocky View (part), Canmore, Mountain View (part), Clearwater, Yellowhead (part), Hinton, Greenview (part), Edson, Banff, Rocky Mountain House

Yellowhead is a federal electoral district in Alberta, Canada, that has been represented in the House of Commons of Canada since 1979. The district is in west-central Alberta and represents: parts of the Municipal District of Greenview No. 16 including Grande Cache, Improvement District No. 25 (Willmore), the Improvement District No. 12 (Jasper), the Municipality of Jasper, Yellowhead County including Hinton and Edson, Brazeau County including Drayton Valley, Lac Ste. Anne County including Alexis 133, Parkland County, Leduc County, Clearwater County including Big Horn 144A, Sunchild 202, and O'Chiese 203, and Rocky Mountain House.

== History ==
The electoral district was created in 1976 from Rocky Mountain, Athabasca, Edmonton West, Pembina, and Wetaskiwin ridings.

Its first and most high-profile MP was Joe Clark. Clark was Prime Minister of Canada in late 1979 and early 1980. He remained a prominent figure on the Progressive Conservative front bench after losing the premiership, in opposition and as a cabinet minister under Brian Mulroney.

This riding lost territory to Peace River—Westlock and Sturgeon River—Parkland, while gaining territory from Wetaskiwin and Wild Rose, during the 2012 Canadian federal electoral redistribution.

Following the 2012 redistribution, portions of this electoral district (notably the town of Whitecourt) joined the newly formed riding of Peace River—Westlock while the regions of Leduc County and Rocky Mountain House were added to Yellowhead.

== Demographics ==
According to the 2011 Canadian census

Languages: 90.5% English, 2.6% French, 1.7% German
Religions: 58.5% Christian (20.6% Catholic, 10.3% United Church, 4.3% Anglican, 4.2% Lutheran, 2.1% Baptist, 1.9% Pentecostal, 15.3% Other Christian), 1.0% Traditional Aboriginal Spirituality, 39.7% No religion
Median income (2010): $34,679

Panethnic groups in Yellowhead (2011−2021)
Panethnic group	2021		2016		2011	
Panethnic group	Pop.	%	Pop.	%	Pop.	%
European (Note: Statistic includes all persons that did not make up part of a visible minority or an indigenous identity.)	79,195	82%	82,715	83.49%	84,470	86.85%
Indigenous	12,100	12.53%	12,060	12.17%	10,130	10.42%
Southeast Asian (Note: Statistic includes total responses of "Filipino" and "Southeast Asian" under visible minority section on census.)	2,625	2.72%	1,820	1.84%	1,170	1.2%
South Asian	745	0.77%	520	0.52%	265	0.27%
East Asian (Note: Statistic includes total responses of "Chinese", "Korean", and "Japanese" under visible minority section on census.)	720	0.75%	615	0.62%	390	0.4%
African	595	0.62%	540	0.55%	315	0.32%
Latin American	215	0.22%	310	0.31%	150	0.15%
Middle Eastern (Note: Statistic includes total responses of "West Asian" and "Arab" under visible minority section on census.)	200	0.21%	185	0.19%	170	0.17%
Other/multiracial (Note: Statistic includes total responses of "Visible minority, n.i.e." and "Multiple visible minorities" under visible minority section on census.)	175	0.18%	305	0.31%	200	0.21%
Total responses	96,575	97.34%	99,070	97.14%	97,255	98.38%
Total population	99,218	100%	101,984	100%	98,855	100%
Notes: Totals greater than 100% due to multiple origin responses. Demographics based on 2012 Canadian federal electoral redistribution riding boundaries.

== Riding associations ==
Riding associations are the local branches of political parties:

Party	Association name	CEO	HQ city
Conservative	Yellowhead Conservative Association	Gerald Ingeveld	Rocky View
Liberal	Yellowhead Federal Liberal Association	Joseph Kyle Pynch	Canmore
New Democratic	Yellowhead Federal NDP Riding Association	Avni Soma	Canmore

== Members of Parliament ==
This riding has elected the following members of Parliament:

Parliament	Years	Member	Party
Yellowhead; Riding created from Rocky Mountain, Athabasca, Edmonton West, Pembina and Wetaskiwin
31st	1979–1980	Joe Clark	Progressive Conservative
32nd	1980–1984	Joe Clark	Progressive Conservative
33rd	1984–1988	Joe Clark	Progressive Conservative
34th	1988–1993	Joe Clark	Progressive Conservative
35th	1993–1997	Cliff Breitkreuz	Reform
36th	1997–2000	Cliff Breitkreuz	Reform
36th	2000–2000	Cliff Breitkreuz	Alliance
37th	2000–2003	Rob Merrifield	Alliance
37th	2003–2004	Rob Merrifield	Conservative
38th	2004–2006	Rob Merrifield	Conservative
39th	2006–2008	Rob Merrifield	Conservative
40th	2008–2011	Rob Merrifield	Conservative
41st	2011–2014	Rob Merrifield	Conservative
41st	2014–2015	Jim Eglinski	Conservative
42nd	2015–2019	Jim Eglinski	Conservative
43rd	2019–2021	Gerald Soroka	Conservative
44th	2021–2025	Gerald Soroka	Conservative
45th	2025–present	William Stevenson	Conservative

== Election results ==
Graph of election results in Yellowhead (minor parties that never got 2% of the vote or didn't run consistently are omitted) View source data.

2025 Canadian federal election
Party	Candidate	Votes	%	±%	Expenditures
Conservative	William Stevenson	47,863	69.08	+8.85	$76,397.22
Liberal	Michael Fark	17,469	25.21	+14.59	$50,817.32
New Democratic	Avni Soma	2,753	3.97	–10.70	$23,897.14
People's	Vicky Bayford	952	1.37	–7.88	$2,409.10
Christian Heritage	Dale Heath	253	0.37	–	$2,052.97
Total valid votes/expense limit		69,290	99.31	–	$171,596.37
Total rejected ballots		484	0.69	+0.12	
Turnout		69,774	74.15	+6.22	
Eligible voters		94,098			
Conservative hold		Swing		–	
Source: Elections Canada

2021 federal election redistributed results
Party	Vote	%
Conservative	35,998	60.23
New Democratic	8,765	14.67
Liberal	6,344	10.62
People's	5,529	9.25
Green	747	1.25
Others	2,381	3.98

2021 Canadian federal election
Party	Candidate	Votes	%	±%	Expenditures
Conservative	Gerald Soroka	33,603	66.16	–15.97	$23,573.05
People's	Michael Manchen	6,475	12.75	+9.90	$3,063.64
New Democratic	Guillaume Roy	5,977	11.77	+4.80	none listed
Liberal	Sheila Schumacher	2,829	5.57	+0.37	$2,023.58
Maverick	Todd Muir	1,761	3.47	–	$9,914.16
Veterans Coalition	Gordon Francey	147	0.29	+0.10	none listed
Total valid votes/expense limit		50,792	99.42	–	$134,881.08
Total rejected ballots		294	0.58	+0.04	
Turnout		51,086	67.93	–5.92	
Eligible voters		75,205			
Conservative hold		Swing		–10.39	
Source: Elections Canada

2019 Canadian federal election
Party	Candidate	Votes	%	±%	Expenditures
Conservative	Gerald Soroka	45,964	82.13	+9.88	$16,739.58
New Democratic	Kristine Bowman	3,898	6.97	–2.08	none listed
Liberal	Jeremy Hoefsloot	2,912	5.20	–9.01	$1,663.38
People's	Douglas Galavan	1,592	2.84	–	$4,988.84
Green	Angelena Satdeo	1,272	2.27	–0.66	none listed
Libertarian	Cory Lystang	222	0.40	–1.16	none listed
Veterans Coalition	Gordon Francey	108	0.19	–	none listed
Total valid votes/expense limit		55,968	99.46	–	$130,889.92
Total rejected ballots		303	0.54	+0.23	
Turnout		56,271	73.85	+4.54	
Eligible voters		76,197			
Conservative hold		Swing		–	
Source: Elections Canada

2015 Canadian federal election
Party	Candidate	Votes	%	±%	Expenditures
Conservative	Jim Eglinski	37,950	72.25	–5.81	$39,133.01
Liberal	Ryan Maguhn	7,467	14.22	+11.32	$4,198.93
New Democratic	Ken Kuzminski	4,753	9.05	–3.83	$1,285.08
Green	Sandra Wolf Lange	1,538	2.93	–2.41	$19.05
Libertarian	Cory Lystang	817	1.56	–	$3,093.70
Total valid votes/expense limit		52,525	99.69	–	$258,177.16
Total rejected ballots		161	0.31	–0.10	
Turnout		52,686	69.31	+53.23	
Eligible voters		76,011			
Conservative hold		Swing		–8.57	
Source: Elections Canada

2011 federal election redistributed results
Party	Vote	%
Conservative	31,238	78.07
New Democratic	5,155	12.88
Green	2,136	5.34
Liberal	1,158	2.89
Others	328	0.82

Canadian federal by-election, November 17, 2014 By-election due to the resignation of Rob Merrifield
Party	Candidate	Votes	%	±%	Expenditures
Conservative	Jim Eglinski	7,884	62.57	–14.46	$45,943.91
Liberal	Ryan Heinz Maguhn	2,518	19.98	+17.11	$29,601.51
New Democratic	Eric Rosendahl	1,203	9.55	–3.51	none listed
Independent	Dean Williams	622	4.94	–	$383.45
Libertarian	Cory Lystang	374	2.97	–	$1,345.08
Total valid votes/expense limit		12,601	99.60	–	$116,479.41
Total rejected ballots		51	0.40	+0.09	
Turnout		12,652	16.09	–39.04	
Eligible voters		78,641			
Conservative hold		Swing		–15.79	
Source: Elections Canada

2011 Canadian federal election
Party	Candidate	Votes	%	±%	Expenditures
Conservative	Rob Merrifield	31,925	77.03	+5.18	$43,778.85
New Democratic	Mark Wells	5,411	13.06	+0.79	$6.00
Green	Monika Schaefer	2,132	5.14	–4.05	$4,433.25
Liberal	Zack Siezmagraff	1,190	2.87	–1.11	$3,914.82
Christian Heritage	Jacob Strydhorst	404	0.98	–0.65	$1,318.68
Canadian Action	Melissa Brade	384	0.93	–0.16	$753.39
Total valid votes/expense limit		41,446	99.69	–	$106,445.21
Total rejected ballots		129	0.31	+0.04	
Turnout		41,575	55.13	+5.17	
Eligible voters		75,410			
Conservative hold		Swing		+2.99	
Source: Elections Canada

2008 Canadian federal election
Party	Candidate	Votes	%	±%	Expenditures
Conservative	Rob Merrifield	26,863	71.85	+0.65	$54,005.95
New Democratic	Ken Kuzminski	4,587	12.27	+1.32	$5,972.10
Green	Monika Schaefer	3,437	9.19	+2.56	$2,250.26
Liberal	Mohamed El-Rafih	1,489	3.98	–5.47	$2,512.00
Christian Heritage	John M. Wierenga	606	1.62	–0.16	$11,570.90
Canadian Action	Melissa Brade	408	1.09	–	$1,904.48
Total valid votes/expense limit		37,390	99.73	–	$103,154.58
Total rejected ballots		103	0.27	+0.06	
Turnout		37,493	49.97	–10.22	
Eligible voters		75,036			
Conservative hold		Swing		+0.99	
Source: Elections Canada

2006 Canadian federal election
Party	Candidate	Votes	%	±%	Expenditures
Conservative	Rob Merrifield	30,640	71.19	+2.58	$56,337.32
New Democratic	J. Noel Lapierre	4,712	10.95	–0.52	$6,293.28
Liberal	Nancy Love	4,066	9.45	–2.05	$3,529.68
Green	Monika Schaefer	2,856	6.64	+0.08	$499.49
Christian Heritage	John M. Wierenga	765	1.78	–0.09	$15,125.77
Total valid votes/expense limit		43,039	99.78	–	$94,602.50
Total rejected ballots		94	0.22	–0.03	
Turnout		43,133	60.19	+3.62	
Eligible voters		71,664			
Conservative hold		Swing		+2.32	
Source: Elections Canada

2004 Canadian federal election
Party	Candidate	Votes	%	±%	Expenditures
Conservative	Rob Merrifield	26,503	68.61	–10.13	$53,539.86
Liberal	Peter Crossley	4,441	11.50	–4.14	$10,183.52
New Democratic	J. Noel Lapierre	4,429	11.47	+6.76	$8,611.38
Green	Eric Stieglitz	2,534	6.56	–	$2,700.02
Christian Heritage	Jacob Strydhorst	721	1.87	+0.96	$13,333.15
Total valid votes/expense limit		38,628	99.75	–	$90,849.68
Total rejected ballots		96	0.25	–0.12	
Turnout		38,724	56.57	–3.86	
Eligible voters		68,457			
Conservative hold		Swing		+7.14	
Source: Elections Canada

2000 Canadian federal election
Party	Candidate	Votes	%	±%	Expenditures
Alliance	Rob Merrifield	26,824	66.08	+1.26	$40,389
Liberal	John Higgerty	6,348	15.64	–2.20	$20,093
Progressive Conservative	Dale F. Galbraith	5,141	12.66	+0.29	$5,162
New Democratic	J. Noel Lapierre	1,910	4.71	–0.26	$1,369
Independent	Jacob Strydhorst	371	0.91	–	$8,158
Total valid votes		40,594	99.63		
Total rejected ballots		151	0.37	+0.06	
Turnout		40,745	60.43	+3.48	
Eligible voters		67,430			
Alliance hold		Swing		+1.73	
Source: Elections Canada

1997 Canadian federal election
Party	Candidate	Votes	%	±%	Expenditures
Reform	Cliff Breitkreuz	22,960	64.82	+9.78	$49,326
Liberal	Nancy Love Crawford	6,318	17.84	–3.81	$46,729
Progressive Conservative	Ross Douglas Pugh	4,383	12.37	–1.63	$9,515
New Democratic	Dennis Atkinson	1,759	4.97	+0.59	none listed
Total valid votes		35,420	99.68		
Total rejected ballots		112	0.32	+0.00	
Turnout		35,532	56.95	–9.67	
Eligible voters		62,395			
Reform hold		Swing		+6.80	
Source: Elections Canada

1993 Canadian federal election
Party	Candidate	Votes	%	±%
Reform	Cliff Breitkreuz	22,790	55.04	+27.09
Liberal	John Higgerty	8,964	21.65	+11.71
Progressive Conservative	Marilyn Stecyk	5,799	14.01	–30.50
New Democratic	Joe Woytowich	1,811	4.37	–11.02
National	Alex S. Mann	1,147	2.77	–
Christian Heritage	Peter Piers	441	1.07	–0.70
Natural Law	Dennis Ronald Michaelchuk	251	0.61	–
Independent	Douglas Bruce Pederson	202	0.49	–
Total valid votes		41,405	99.69	
Total rejected ballots		129	0.31	+0.05
Turnout		41,534	66.62	–9.13
Eligible voters		62,348		
Reform gain from Progressive Conservative		Swing		–
Source: Elections Canada

1988 Canadian federal election
Party	Candidate	Votes	%	±%
Progressive Conservative	Joe Clark	17,847	44.51	–29.50
Reform	Preston Manning	11,207	27.95	–
New Democratic	Muriel Stanley Venne	6,172	15.39	+1.75
Liberal	John Higgerty	3,987	9.94	+1.85
Christian Heritage	John M. Torringa	708	1.77	–
Confederation of Regions	Peter Hope	90	0.22	–1.41
Independent	Pat George A. O'Hara	86	0.21	–
Total valid votes		40,097	99.74	
Total rejected ballots		105	0.26	+0.08
Turnout		40,202	75.74	+6.66
Eligible voters		53,078		
Progressive Conservative hold		Swing		–
Source: Elections Canada

1984 Canadian federal election
Party	Candidate	Votes	%	±%
Progressive Conservative	Joe Clark	37,462	74.01	+4.53
New Democratic	Rick Hardy	6,906	13.64	+2.31
Liberal	Louis H. Joy	4,097	8.09	–10.05
Confederation of Regions	G.R. Snow	829	1.64	–
Rhinoceros	Douglas Alan Bush	773	1.53	–
Social Credit	Audrey Sweigard	553	1.09	–
Total valid votes		50,620	99.82	
Total rejected ballots		93	0.18	+0.00
Turnout		50,713	69.08	+6.62
Eligible voters		73,411		
Progressive Conservative hold		Swing		–
Source: Elections Canada

1980 Canadian federal election
Party	Candidate	Votes	%	±%
Progressive Conservative	Joe Clark	27,953	69.47	–0.53
Liberal	Laurie Switzer	7,302	18.15	+0.96
New Democratic	Laird Mitchell	4,562	11.34	+2.60
Independent	Robert L.T. Brower	249	0.62	–
Independent	Brian K. Fallis	170	0.42	–
Total valid votes		40,236	99.82	
Total rejected ballots		73	0.18	–0.17
Turnout		40,309	62.46	–5.94
Eligible voters		64,537		
Progressive Conservative hold		Swing		–0.75
Source: Elections Canada

1979 Canadian federal election
Party	Candidate	Votes	%	±%
Progressive Conservative	Joe Clark	28,849	70.01	–
Liberal	Laurie Switzer	7,083	17.19	–
New Democratic	Bob Ritchie	3,600	8.74	–
Independent	Lex Miller	1,535	3.73	–
Independent	Ronnie B. Plaunt	143	0.35	–
Total valid votes		41,210	99.65	
Total rejected ballots		146	0.35	–
Turnout		41,356	68.40	–
Eligible voters		60,462		
Progressive Conservative notional hold		Swing		–
Source: Elections Canada

== See also ==
- List of Canadian electoral districts
- Historical federal electoral districts of Canada

Parliament of Canada
Preceded by Mount Royal	Constituency represented by the prime minister 1979	Succeeded by Mount Royal
