= Gerald Soroka =

Canadian politician

Member of Parliament for Yellowhead
- In office October 21, 2019 – March 23, 2025
- Preceded by: Jim Eglinski
- Succeeded by: William Stevenson

Personal details
- Born: Evansburg, Alberta, Canada
- Party: Conservative Party of Canada

Gerald Soroka is a Conservative politician who was elected to represent the riding of Yellowhead in the House of Commons of Canada in the 2019 Canadian federal election and was re-elected to the 44th Canadian Parliament. He did not seek re-election in 2025 after losing the Conservative nomination.

== Biography ==
Soroka was born and raised at Evansburg, Alberta in Yellowhead County and attended Grand Trunk High School.

=== In municipal politics ===
Prior to his election Soroka served as mayor of Yellowhead County, Alberta since 2007, and as a county councillor for division one from 2004 to 2007.

=== In federal politics ===
Soroka won the Conservative nomination for Yellowhead riding to replace the retiring incumbent, Jim Eglinski, on October 14, 2018. He ran in the 2019 Canadian federal election and was re-elected in 2021.

On June 22, 2024, Soroka lost the Conservative nomination in the 2025 Canadian federal election to William Stevenson.

== Personal life ==
Soroka resides on a farm near Evansburg, Alberta, his family's original homestead.

== Electoral record ==
=== Federal ===
2021 Canadian federal election: Yellowhead
Party	Candidate	Votes	%	±%	Expenditures
Conservative	Gerald Soroka	33,603	66.2	-15.9	$18,788.06
People's	Michael Manchen	6,475	12.7	+9.9	$3,063.64
New Democratic	Guillaume Roy	5,977	11.8	+4.8	$0.00
Liberal	Sheila Schumacher	2,829	5.6	+0.4	$0.00
Maverick	Todd Muir	1,761	3.5	–	$9,914.16
Veterans Coalition	Gordon Francey	147	0.3	+0.1	$0.00
Total valid votes/expense limit		50,792	99.42	-0.04	$134,881.08
Total rejected ballots		294	0.58	+0.04	
Turnout		51,086	69.2	-6.8	
Eligible voters		73,799			
Conservative hold		Swing		-10.8	
Source: Elections Canada

2019 Canadian federal election: Yellowhead
Party	Candidate	Votes	%	±%	Expenditures
Conservative	Gerald Soroka	45,964	82.1	+9.85	$16,739.58
New Democratic	Kristine Bowman	3,898	7.0	-2.05	none listed
Liberal	Jeremy Hoefsloot	2,912	5.2	-9.02	none listed
People's	Douglas Galavan	1,592	2.8	-	$4,988.84
Green	Angelena Satdeo	1,272	2.3	-0.63	$0.00
Libertarian	Cory Lystang	222	0.4	-1.16	none listed
Veterans Coalition	Gordon Francey	108	0.2	-	$0.00
Total valid votes/expense limit		55,968	100.0		
Total rejected ballots		303			
Turnout		56,271	76.0		
Eligible voters		74,005			
Conservative hold		Swing		+5.95	
Source: Elections Canada

=== Municipal ===
2017 Yellowhead County mayoral election
Mayoral candidate	Vote	%
Gerald Soroka (X)	1,293	47.47
Maxine Beasley	746	27.39
Ruth Martin Williams	548	20.12
Dallas Haywood	137	5.03

2013 Yellowhead County mayoral election
Candidate	Vote	%
Gerald Soroka (X)	1,226	52.51
Roxanne Scherger	882	37.77
Dallas Haywood	227	9.72

2010 Yellowhead County mayoral election
Candidate	Vote	%
Gerald Soroka	Acclaimed	
