= Cliff Breitkreuz =

Canadian politician

Clifford N. Breitkreuz (born July 30, 1940 near Onoway, Alberta, Canada) is a former Canadian politician, who represented the electoral district of Yellowhead in the Canadian House of Commons from 1993 to 2000 as a member of the Reform Party of Canada.

He was raised on a farm and lived there until he left to earn his university degrees (a B.A. from the University of Alberta and a B.Ed. from the University of Lethbridge). In 1967 he returned to farming, and started teaching at Onoway Junior/Senior High School not long after that. He taught for seven years and later was elected as a member of parliament for Yellowhead for two terms (from 1993 to 2000).

He was a winning candidate in the 2004 Alberta Senatorial Election and as such was a senator-in-waiting pending a vacant Alberta Senate (and a prime minister willing to honor the non-binding election). Breitkruez term as a senator-in-waiting expired with the 2012 Alberta Senate nominee election in which he did not re-offer as a candidate. He still farms with his wife, Shirley.

Parliament of Canada
Preceded by Joe Clark	Member of Parliament Yellowhead; 1993–2000	Succeeded by Rob Merrifield
