= Robin Campbell (politician) =

Canadian politician

The Honourable Robin Campbell ECA

Member of the Legislative Assembly of Alberta for West Yellowhead
- In office March 3, 2008 – May 5, 2015
- Preceded by: Ivan Strang
- Succeeded by: Eric Rosendahl

Personal details
- Born: Robin Ian Campbell; September 9, 1955 (age 70)
- Party: Progressive Conservative

Robin Ian Campbell ECA (born September 9, 1955) is a former Canadian provincial-level politician. He was elected in 2008 to represent the electoral district of West Yellowhead in the Legislative Assembly of Alberta. He was a member of the former governing Progressive Conservative caucus. He was appointed Minister of Finance and President of the Treasury Board by Premier Jim Prentice on September 15, 2014. He lost his seat to Eric Rosendahl in the May 5, 2015 provincial election that also defeated the Progressive Conservative government after 44 years in office. On November 12, he was named president of the Coal Association of Canada.

== Political career ==
Campbell ran for a seat in the Alberta Legislature for the first time in the 2008 Alberta general election. He won his first term to represent the electoral district of West Yellowhead by a wide margin to hold it for the governing Progressive Conservative caucus.

== Electoral history ==
2008 Alberta general election: West Yellowhead
Party	Candidate	Votes	%	±%
Progressive Conservative	Robin Campbell	4,206	53.83%	8.10%
Liberal	Lisa Higgerty	1,932	24.72%	4.43%
New Democratic	Ken Kuzminski	1,054	13.49%	-8.09%
Wildrose Alliance	Earle Cunningham	326	4.17%	-4.05%
Green	Scott Pickett	296	3.79%	-0.39%
Total		7,814	–	–
Rejected, spoiled and declined		26	5	1
Eligible electors / turnout		20,770	37.75%	-8.76%
Progressive Conservative hold		Swing		2.48%
Source(s) Source: "81 - West Yellowhead, 2008 Alberta general election". officialresults.elections.ab.ca. Elections Alberta. Chief Electoral Officer (2008). The Report on the March 3, 2008 Provincial General Election of the Twenty-Seventh Legislative Assembly (Report). Edmonton, Alta.: Elections Alberta. pp. 558–563.

2012 Alberta general election: West Yellowhead
Party	Candidate	Votes	%	±%
Progressive Conservative	Robin Campbell	4,393	44.59%	-9.24%
Wildrose Alliance	Stuart Taylor	2,688	27.28%	23.11%
Alberta Party	Glenn Taylor	1,668	16.93%	–
New Democratic	Barry Madsen	797	8.09%	-5.40%
Liberal	Michael Martyna	307	3.12%	-21.61%
Total		9,853	–	–
Rejected, spoiled and declined		51	25	5
Eligible electors / turnout		20,919	47.37%	9.62%
Progressive Conservative hold		Swing		-5.90%
Source(s) Source: "85 - West Yellowhead, 2012 Alberta general election". officialresults.elections.ab.ca. Elections Alberta. Chief Electoral Officer (2012). The Report of the Chief Electoral Officer on the 2011 Provincial Enumeration and Monday, April 23, 2012 Provincial General Election of the Twenty-eighth Legislative Assembly (PDF) (Report). Edmonton, Alta.: Elections Alberta. Archived (PDF) from the original on 6 May 2021.

2015 Alberta general election: West Yellowhead
Party	Candidate	Votes	%	±%
New Democratic	Eric Rosendahl	4,135	38.92%	30.84%
Progressive Conservative	Robin Campbell	3,433	32.32%	-12.27%
Wildrose	Stuart Taylor	3,055	28.76%	1.48%
Total		10,623	–	–
Rejected, spoiled and declined		40	9	12
Eligible electors / turnout		23,063	46.29%	-1.08%
New Democratic gain from Progressive Conservative		Swing		-5.35%
Source(s) Source: "85 - West Yellowhead, 2015 Alberta general election". officialresults.elections.ab.ca. Elections Alberta. Chief Electoral Officer (2016). 2015 General Election. A Report of the Chief Electoral Officer (PDF) (Report). Edmonton, Alta.: Elections Alberta.
