= Division No. 14, Alberta =

Census division in Canada

Coordinates: 53°34′48″N 116°25′12″W

Division No. 14
- Census division in Alberta
- Country: Canada
- Province: Alberta

Area
  - Total: 26,965 km^{2} (10,411 sq mi)

Population (2021)
  - Total: 28,617
  - Density: 1.0613/km^{2} (2.7487/sq mi)

Division No. 14 is a census division in Alberta, Canada. The majority of the division is located in the western portion of central Alberta, while the westernmost portion of the division is located within Alberta's Rockies. The division's largest urban community is the Town of Hinton.

== Census subdivisions ==
Historical population
Year	Pop.	±%
1991	25,784	—
1996	27,452	+6.5%
2001	26,871	−2.1%
2006	27,881	+3.8%
2011	28,584	+2.5%
2016	29,291	+2.5%
2021	28,617	−2.3%

The following census subdivisions (municipalities or municipal equivalents) are located within Alberta's Division No. 14.

- Towns
  - Edson
  - Hinton
- Hamlets
  - Brulé
  - Cadomin
  - Entrance
  - Evansburg
  - Marlboro
  - Niton Junction
  - Obed
  - Peers
  - Pinedale
  - Robb
  - Wildwood
- Municipal districts
  - Yellowhead County
- Improvement districts
  - Improvement District No. 25 (Willmore Wilderness Park)

== Demographics ==
In the 2021 Census of Population conducted by Statistics Canada, Division No. 14 had a population of 28,617 living in 11,552 of its 13,032 total private dwellings, a change of −2.3% from its 2016 population of 29,291. With a land area of 26,902.83 km^{2} (10,387.24 sq mi), it had a population density of 1.1/km^{2} (2.8/sq mi) in 2021.

== See also ==
- List of census divisions of Alberta
- List of communities in Alberta
