= Rob Merrifield =

Canadian politician

The Honourable Robert Merrifield PC

Member of Parliament for Yellowhead
- In office November 27, 2000 – September 17, 2014
- Preceded by: Cliff Breitkreuz
- Succeeded by: Jim Eglinski

Chair of the Standing Committee on International Trade
- In office June 23, 2011 – September 29, 2014
- Minister: Ed Fast
- Preceded by: Lee Richardson
- Succeeded by: Randy Hoback

Chair of the Standing Committee on Finance
- In office November 13, 2007 – February 2, 2009
- Minister: Jim Flaherty
- Preceded by: Brian Pallister
- Succeeded by: James Rajotte

Chair of the Standing Committee on Health
- In office May 4, 2006 – November 12, 2007
- Minister: Tony Clement
- Preceded by: Bonnie Brown
- Succeeded by: Joy Smith

Personal details
- Born: December 19, 1953 (age 72) Mayerthorpe, Alberta, Canada
- Party: Canadian Alliance (2000-2003), Conservative (2003-2014)
- Spouse: Brenda Merrifield
- Profession: businessman, farmer

Robert Merrifield, PC, (born December 19, 1953) is a Canadian politician and diplomat. He is the former Member of Parliament for Yellowhead, and was the Minister of State for Transport from October 2008 to May 2011. In September 2014 he resigned as a Member of the Canadian House of Commons to accept an appointment from Alberta Premier Jim Prentice to be the province's envoy to the United States in Washington, D.C. where he will lobby for approval of the Keystone XL pipeline.

His accomplishments included revitalizing Marine Atlantic with two new ferries, initiating Canada Post's postal transformation, and overseeing the rollout of Transport Canada's Alberta and Saskatchewan infrastructure funds as a part of Canada's Economic Action Plan.

Merrifield was first elected to represent Yellowhead in 2000. He was re-elected in 2004, 2006, and 2008.

His past community involvement has included terms as chair and elected board member of the Whitecourt School District Board of Trustees, chair and vice-chair of the Whitecourt/Fox Creek Hospital Board, member of the Aspen Regional Health Authority, member of the Northern Gateway Regional Division No. 10 School Authority and elected member of the Woodland County Council.
