= Jim Eglinski =

Canadian politician (born 1948)

Member of Parliament for Yellowhead
- In office November 17, 2014 – October 21, 2019
- Preceded by: Rob Merrifield
- Succeeded by: Gerald Soroka

Mayor of Yellowhead County
- Incumbent
- Assumed office January 14, 2020

Mayor of Fort St. John, British Columbia
- In office 2005–2008
- Preceded by: Steve Thorlakson
- Succeeded by: Bruce Lantz

Personal details
- Born: William James Eglinski; December 15, 1948 (age 77) Two Hills, Alberta, Canada
- Party: Conservative
- Profession: RCMP then MP

William James Eglinski (born December 15, 1948) is a Canadian politician who served as the Member of Parliament for the federal electoral district of Yellowhead, in western Alberta, from 2014 to 2019. He is a member of the Conservative Party.

== Background ==
Eglinski was born in Two Hills, Alberta and raised in Chipman, Alberta on a farm. He worked for 40 years as a Royal Canadian Mounted Police officer, and served as a councillor and eventually mayor for the town of Fort St. John, British Columbia.

== Federal Politics ==
Eglinski was first elected to represent the riding Yellowhead in a 2014 by-election.

He was re-elected in the 2015 Canadian federal election with over 70 percent of the vote. In the 42nd Canadian Parliament, his Conservative Party formed the Official Opposition. While he was not assigned to a critic role, Eglinski did introduce one private member bill into the House of Commons, An Act to amend the Criminal Code (abuse of vulnerable persons) (Bill C-206), which sought to make physical, emotional, sexual or financial abuse of a senior or someone who depends on others due to a mental or physical disability to be an aggravating circumstance for sentencing purposes. The bill was introduced on December 10, 2015, but did not advance to second reading.

In 2016, Eglinski surprised many by participating in the flag-raising to kick off Pride Week in Jasper, Alberta, a rare move for a Conservative MP. Acknowledging that he once opposed condoning homosexuality and saw no need for LGBT pride celebration, Eglinski credited his change of heart to the coming-out of one of his grandchildren.

In the 2017 Conservative Party leadership contest, Eglinski initially endorsed eventual winner Andrew Scheer, but later switched his endorsement to Erin O'Toole.

On June 16, 2017 Eglinski asked the government for a plan to protect the park from the pine beetle, and the residents who were "concerned for their own safety.. and the security of their homes," and the security of the tourists in the park. Catherine McKenna who was then Minister of Environment and Climate Change offered to discuss this question in private. Eglinski continued to raise the issue throughout his tenure in Parliament but he never managed to convince the government that there was a danger. Eglinski continued to pepper and prod the government, for example: "In June this year, the minister said in the House that she looked forward to discussing it further, but I have continued to repeatedly bring up the pine beetle issue because there has been no talk and no action."

In late 2017, Eglinski faced nomination challenge for re-election from Ryan Ouderkirk, a parliamentary assistant to fellow MP David Yurdiga. "Surprised" by and "not happy" with the challenge, Eglinski announced in January 2018 that he would not seek re-election in 2019.

== Electoral record ==
2015 Canadian federal election: Yellowhead
Party	Candidate	Votes	%	±%	Expenditures
Conservative	Jim Eglinski	37,950	72.3	-5.77	–
Liberal	Ryan Maguhn	7,467	14.2	+11.31	–
New Democratic	Ken Kuzminski	4,753	9.0	-3.88	–
Green	Sandra Wolf Lange	1,538	2.9	-2.44	–
Libertarian	Cory Lystang	817	1.6	-1.4	–
Total valid votes/Expense limit		52,525	100.0		$257,007.56
Total rejected ballots		161	–	–	
Turnout		52,686	71.2%	–	
Eligible voters		73,996			
Conservative hold		Swing		-8.54	
Source: Elections Canada

Canadian federal by-election, November 17, 2014: Yellowhead By-election due to the resignation of Rob Merrifield
Party	Candidate	Votes	%	±%	Expenditures
Conservative	Jim Eglinski	7,884	62.57	−14.46	–
Liberal	Ryan Heinz Maguhn	2,518	19.98	+17.11	–
New Democratic	Eric Rosendahl	1,203	9.55	−3.51	–
Independent	Dean Williams	622	4.94		–
Libertarian	Cory Lystang	374	2.97		–
Total valid votes/expense limit			100.0		–
Total rejected ballots					
Turnout		12,601	16.06	−40.10	
Eligible voters		78,481		+6.00	
Conservative hold		Swing		−15.79	
Source(s) "By-election Results". Elections Canada. November 17, 2014.
