= Warner (provincial electoral district) =

Defunct provincial electoral district in Alberta, Canada

Alberta electoral district

Defunct provincial electoral district
- Legislature: Legislative Assembly of Alberta
- District created: 1913
- District abolished: 1963
- First contested: 1913
- Last contested: 1959

Warner was a provincial electoral district in Alberta, Canada, mandated to return a single member to the Legislative Assembly of Alberta from 1913 to 1963.

== History ==
The Warner electoral district was formed prior to the 1913 Alberta general election from the eastern portion of the Cardston electoral district and a small portion of the Lethbridge District.

The Warner electoral district would be abolished prior to the 1963 Alberta general election, and the territory would be split between the Taber-Warner and Cypress electoral districts.

=== Members of the Legislative Assembly (MLAs) ===
Members of the Legislative Assembly for Warner
Assembly	Years	Member	Party
See Lethbridge District from 1909-1913 and Cardston electoral district from 1905-1913
3rd	1913–1917	Frank S. Leffingwell	Liberal
4th	1917–1921	Frank S. Leffingwell	Liberal
5th	1921–1926	Maurice J. Conner	United Farmers
6th	1926–1930	Maurice J. Conner	United Farmers
7th	1930–1935	Maurice J. Conner	United Farmers
8th	1935–1940	Solon Earl Low	Social Credit
9th	1940–1944	James H. Walker	Independent Movement
10th	1944–1945	Solon Earl Low	Social Credit
10th	1945–1948	Leonard C. Halmrast	Social Credit
11th	1948–1952	Leonard C. Halmrast	Social Credit
12th	1952–1955	Leonard C. Halmrast	Social Credit
13th	1955–1959	Leonard C. Halmrast	Social Credit
14th	1959–1963	Leonard C. Halmrast	Social Credit
See Taber-Warner electoral district from 1963-1997 and Cypress electoral district from 1963-1986

== Election results ==
=== 1913 ===
1913 Alberta general election
Party	Candidate	Votes	%	±%
Liberal	Frank S. Leffingwell	314	43.67%	–
Independent	William T. Patton	268	37.27%	–
Conservative	W. H. Scott	137	19.05%	–
Total		719	–	–
Rejected, spoiled and declined		N/A	–	–
Eligible electors / turnout		1,055	68.15%	–
Liberal pickup new district.				
Source(s) Source: "Warner Official Results 1913 Alberta general election". Alberta Heritage Community Foundation.

=== 1917 ===
1917 Alberta general election
Party	Candidate	Votes	%	±%
Liberal	Frank S. Leffingwell	706	64.89%	21.22%
Conservative	Hy. Jas. Tennant	382	35.11%	16.06%
Total		1,088	–	–
Rejected, spoiled and declined		N/A	–	–
Eligible electors / turnout		1,820	59.78%	-8.37%
Liberal hold		Swing		11.69%
Source(s) Source: "Warner Official Results 1917 Alberta general election". Alberta Heritage Community Foundation.

=== 1921 ===
1921 Alberta general election
Party	Candidate	Votes	%	±%
United Farmers	Maurice J. Conner	755	60.64%	–
Liberal	Frank S. Leffingwell	490	39.36%	-25.53%
Total		1,245	–	–
Rejected, spoiled and declined		N/A	–	–
Eligible electors / turnout		1,665	74.77%	14.99%
United Farmers gain from Liberal		Swing		-4.25%
Source(s) Source: "Warner Official Results 1921 Alberta general election". Alberta Heritage Community Foundation.

=== 1926 ===
1926 Alberta general election
Party	Candidate	Votes	%	±%
United Farmers	Maurice J. Conner	741	64.10%	3.46%
Liberal	Frank S. Leffingwell	225	19.46%	-19.89%
Conservative	G. N. Giles	190	16.44%	–
Total		1,156	–	–
Rejected, spoiled and declined		77	–	–
Eligible electors / turnout		1,614	76.39%	1.62%
United Farmers hold		Swing		11.68%
Source(s) Source: "Warner Official Results 1926 Alberta general election". Alberta Heritage Community Foundation.

=== 1930 ===
1930 Alberta general election
Party	Candidate	Votes	%	±%
United Farmers	Maurice J. Conner	1,342	65.43%	1.33%
Liberal	R. W. Risinger	709	34.57%	15.10%
Total		2,051	–	–
Rejected, spoiled and declined		77	–	–
Eligible electors / turnout		3,010	70.70%	-5.70%
United Farmers hold		Swing		-6.89%
Source(s) Source: "Warner Official Results 1930 Alberta general election". Alberta Heritage Community Foundation.

=== 1935 ===
1935 Alberta general election
Party	Candidate	Votes	%	±%
Social Credit	Solon Earl Low	1,702	55.78%	–
United Farmers	James H. Walker	588	19.27%	-46.16%
Liberal	Frank S. Leffingwell	534	17.50%	-17.07%
Independent	H. C. Moir	227	7.44%	–
Total		3,051	–	–
Rejected, spoiled and declined		99	–	–
Eligible electors / turnout		3,809	82.70%	12.00%
Social Credit gain from United Farmers		Swing		2.82%
Source(s) Source: "Warner Official Results 1935 Alberta general election". Alberta Heritage Community Foundation.

=== 1940 ===
1940 Alberta general election
Party	Candidate	Votes	%	±%
Independent Movement	James H. Walker	1,937	55.42%	36.15%
Social Credit	Solon Earl Low	1,558	44.58%	-11.21%
Total		3,495	–	–
Rejected, spoiled and declined		98	–	–
Eligible electors / turnout		4,327	83.04%	0.34%
Independent Movement gain from Social Credit		Swing		-12.83%
Source(s) Source: "Warner Official Results 1940 Alberta general election". Alberta Heritage Community Foundation.

=== 1944 ===
1944 Alberta general election
Party	Candidate	Votes	%	±%
Social Credit	Solon Earl Low	1,621	51.54%	6.96%
Independent Movement	James H. Walker	629	20.00%	-35.42%
Single Tax	W. Martin Madge	480	15.26%	–
Co-operative Commonwealth	R. B. Eshorn	415	13.20%	–
Total		3,145	–	–
Rejected, spoiled and declined		64	–	–
Eligible electors / turnout		4,273	75.10%	-7.94%
Social Credit gain from Independent Movement		Swing		10.35%
Source(s) Source: "Warner Official Results 1944 Alberta general election". Alberta Heritage Community Foundation.

=== 1945 by-election ===
Alberta provincial by-election, August 6, 1945 Upon Solon Earl Low's resignation
Party	Candidate	Votes	%	±%
Social Credit	Leonard C. Halmrast	991	75.94%	24.40%
Single Tax	H.J. Hierath	314	24.06%	-8.80%
Total		1,305	–	–
Rejected, spoiled and declined		N/A	–	–
Eligible electors / turnout		N/A	N/A	–
Social Credit hold		Swing		–
Source(s) "By-elections". elections.ab.ca. Elections Alberta.

=== 1948 ===
1948 Alberta general election
Party	Candidate	Votes	%	±%
Social Credit	Leonard C. Halmrast	1,691	73.88%	22.33%
Liberal	William John Colliton	598	26.12%	–
Total		2,289	–	–
Rejected, spoiled and declined		346	–	–
Eligible electors / turnout		4,915	53.61%	-21.49%
Social Credit hold		Swing		8.10%
Source(s) Source: "Warner Official Results 1948 Alberta general election". Alberta Heritage Community Foundation.

=== 1952 ===
1952 Alberta general election
Party	Candidate	Votes	%	±%
Social Credit	Leonard C. Halmrast	1,904	75.05%	1.17%
Liberal	George S. Snow	633	24.95%	-1.17%
Total		2,537	–	–
Rejected, spoiled and declined		146	–	–
Eligible electors / turnout		5,443	49.29%	-4.32%
Social Credit hold		Swing		1.17%
Source(s) Source: "Warner Official Results 1952 Alberta general election". Alberta Heritage Community Foundation.

=== 1955 ===
1955 Alberta general election
Party	Candidate	Votes	%	±%
Social Credit	Leonard C. Halmrast	1,917	61.94%	-13.11%
Liberal	J. L. Evans	1,178	38.06%	13.11%
Total		3,095	–	–
Rejected, spoiled and declined		143	–	–
Eligible electors / turnout		5,808	55.75%	6.46%
Social Credit hold		Swing		-13.11%
Source(s) Source: "Warner Official Results 1955 Alberta general election". Alberta Heritage Community Foundation.

=== 1959 ===
1959 Alberta general election
Party	Candidate	Votes	%	±%
Social Credit	Leonard C. Halmrast	2,430	72.65%	10.71%
Liberal	Mark R. Stringam	915	27.35%	-10.71%
Total		3,345	–	–
Rejected, spoiled and declined		6	–	–
Eligible electors / turnout		5,335	62.81%	7.06%
Social Credit hold		Swing		10.71%
Source(s) Source: "Warner Official Results 1959 Alberta general election". Alberta Heritage Community Foundation.

== Plebiscite results ==
=== 1957 liquor plebiscite ===
1957 Alberta liquor plebiscite results: Warner
Question A: Do you approve additional types of outlets for the sale of beer, wine and spirituous liquor subject to a local vote?
Ballot choice	Votes	%
No	1,399	64.74%
Yes	762	35.26%
Total votes	2,161	100%
Rejected, spoiled and declined	21	
5,197 eligible electors, turnout 41.99%

On October 30, 1957, a stand-alone plebiscite was held province wide in all 50 of the then current provincial electoral districts in Alberta. The government decided to consult Alberta voters to decide on liquor sales and mixed drinking after a divisive debate in the legislature. The plebiscite was intended to deal with the growing demand for reforming antiquated liquor control laws.

The plebiscite was conducted in two parts. Question A, asked in all districts, asked the voters if the sale of liquor should be expanded in Alberta, while Question B, asked in a handful of districts within the corporate limits of Calgary and Edmonton, asked if men and women should be allowed to drink together in establishments.

Province wide Question A of the plebiscite passed in 33 of the 50 districts while Question B passed in all five districts. Warner voted against the proposal with a heavy majority. The voter turnout in the district was well below the province wide average of 46%.

Official district returns were released to the public on December 31, 1957. The Social Credit government in power at the time did not consider the results binding. However the results of the vote led the government to repeal all existing liquor legislation and introduce an entirely new Liquor Act.

Municipal districts lying inside electoral districts that voted against the plebiscite such as Warner were designated Local Option Zones by the Alberta Liquor Control Board and considered effective dry zones. Business owners who wanted a licence had to petition for a binding municipal plebiscite in order to be granted a licence.

== See also ==
- List of Alberta provincial electoral districts
- Canadian provincial electoral districts
- Warner, a town in southern Alberta
