= Labor-Progressive Party candidates in the 1945 Canadian federal election =

The Labor-Progressive Party ran 68 candidates in the 1945 federal election. One candidate, Fred Rose, was elected. Some of the party's candidates have their own biography pages; information about others may be found here.

== Alberta ==
=== Vegreville: William Halina ===
William Halina was a frequent candidate for the Labor-Progressive Party and its antecedents, running twice at the federal level and twice at the provincial level. He described himself as an accountant in the 1940 election, and as a manager in 1945.

Electoral record
Election	Division	Party	Votes	%	Place	Winner
1935 provincial	Vermilion	Communist	838		3/5	William Fallow, Social Credit
1940 federal	Vegreville	United Progressive	2,727	19.38	3/4	Anthony Hlynka, Social Credit
1944 provincial	Edmonton	Labor-Progressive	496		14/18	Ernest Charles Manning, Elmer Ernest Roper, John Percy Page, William F. Williams, Norman B. James
1945 federal	Vegreville	Labor-Progressive	3,272	19.37	3/4	Anthony Hlynka, Social Credit

Note: Provincial elections in Alberta were determined by a single transferable ballot in this period, and Edmonton elected five members. The results listed above refer only to the first round totals.

=== Wetaskiwin: Henry Lundgren ===
Henry Lundgren was a farmer. He received 546 votes (3.00%), finishing fifth against Social Credit incumbent Norman Jaques.
