= 1944 Alberta general election =

- August 8, 1944

60 seats in the Legislative Assembly of Alberta 31 seats were needed for a majority
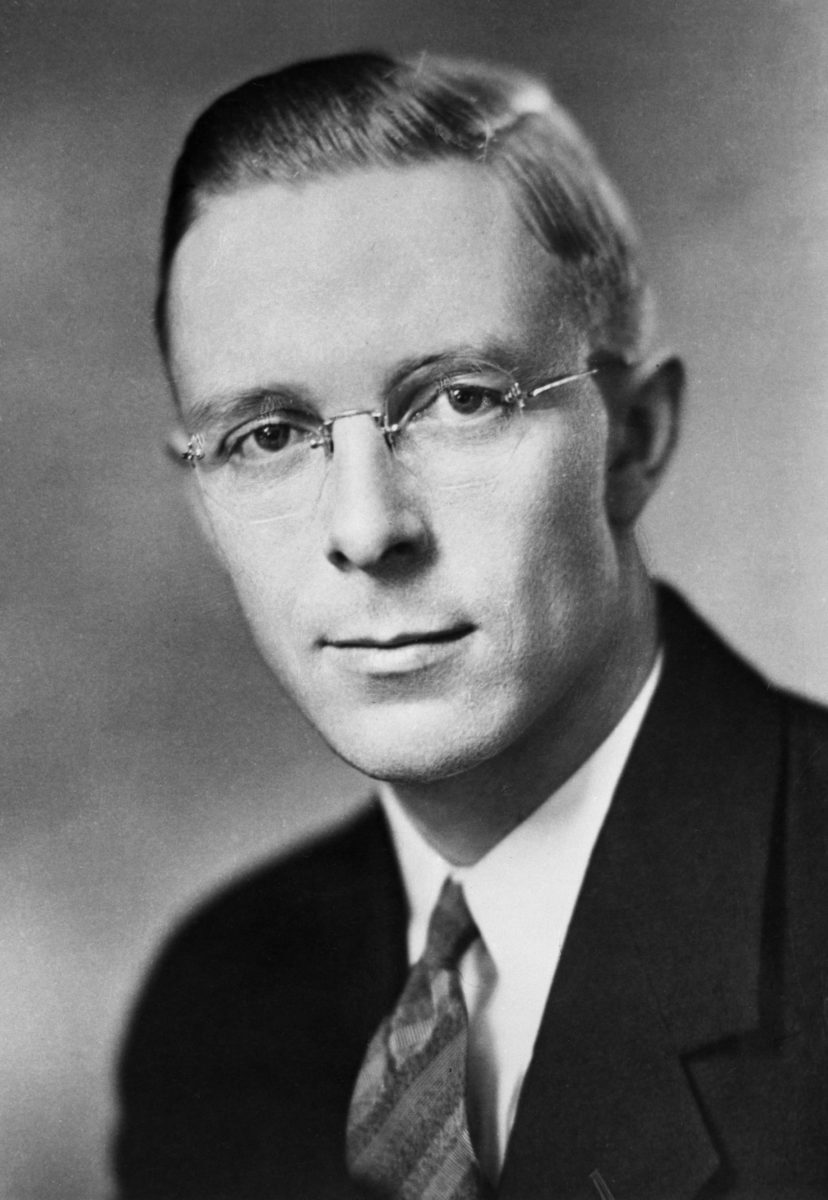

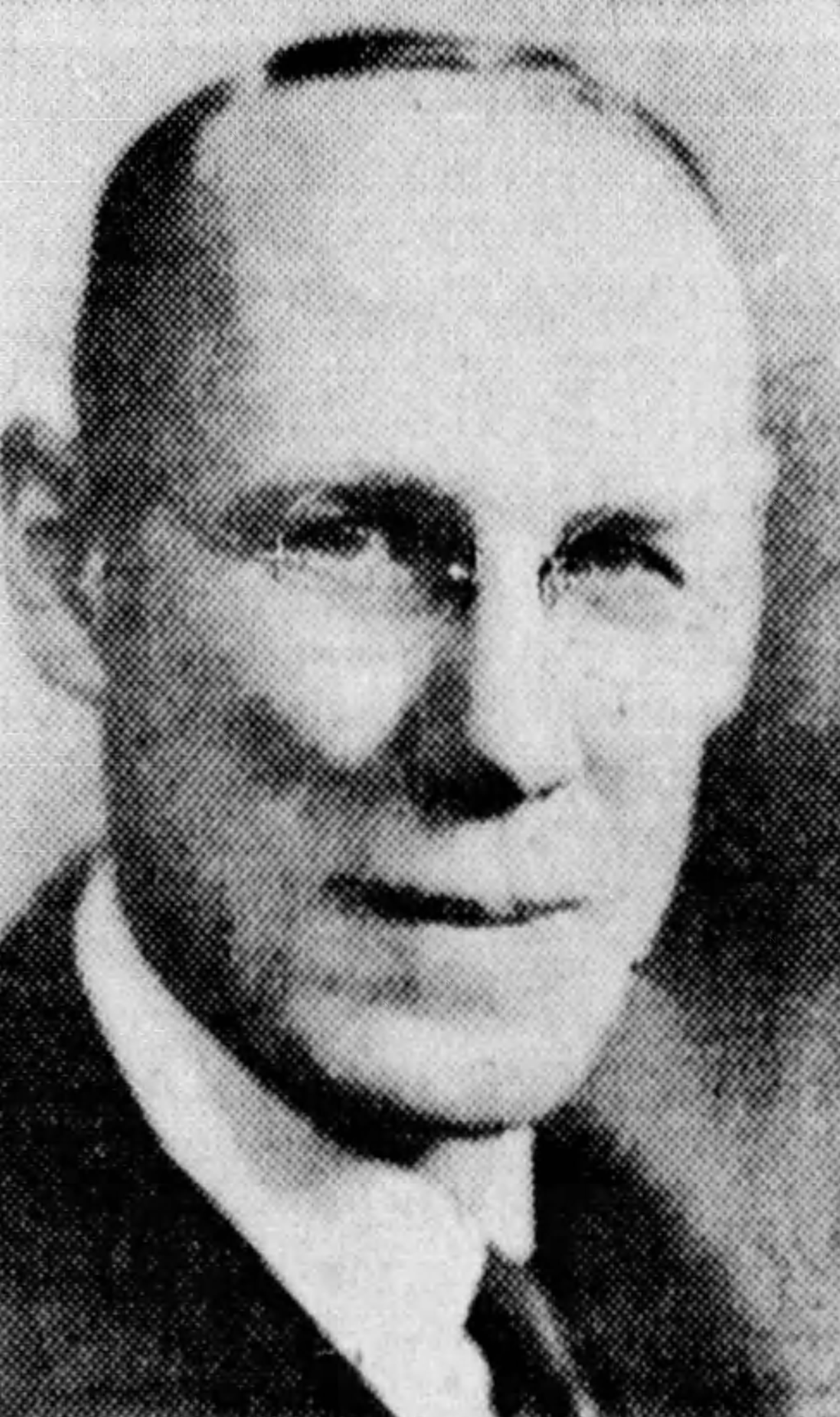
| | Majority party | Minority party |
|---|---|---|
| | | IM |
| Leader | Ernest Manning | James H. Walker |
| Party | Social Credit | Independent Movement |
| Leader since | May 31, 1943 | 1944 |
| Leader's seat | Edmonton | Warner (lost re-election) |
| Last election | 36 seats, 42.9% | 19 seats, 42.5% |
| Seats before | 35 | 15 |
| Seats won | 51 | 3 |
| Seat change | ▲16 | ▼12 |
| Popular vote | 146,367 | 47,239 |
| Percentage | 50.5% | 16.3% |
| Swing | ▲7.6% | ▼26.2% |
| | Third party | Fourth party |
| | | V&AF |
| Leader | Elmer E. Roper | William J. Williams |
| Party | Co-operative Commonwealth | Veterans' and Active Force |
| Leader since | 1942 | 1944 |
| Leader's seat | Edmonton | Edmonton |
| Last election | 0 seats, 11.1% | pre-creation |
| Seats before | 1 | 0 |
| Seats won | 2 | 1 |
| Seat change | ▲1 | ▲1 |
| Popular vote | 70,307 | 3,532 |
| Percentage | 24.2% | 1.2% |
| Swing | ▲13.1% | — |
Premier before election
Ernest Manning
Social Credit
Premier after election
Ernest Manning
Social Credit

The 1944 Alberta general election was held on August 8, 1944, to elect members of the Legislative Assembly of Alberta.

As well, in late 1944 and early 1945, Albertans serving in the military voted for separate representation - by electing an Army, an Air Force and a Navy representative (see "Soldiers' vote" below).

The election was the first contested by leader Ernest C. Manning. Previously Provincial Secretary, he became leader of the Social Credit Party and premier after party founder, Premier William Aberhart, died in 1943. Manning steered the party down a more moderate path, largely dispensing with the party's social credit policies of monetary reform that it had been mostly unable to implement. The provinces's improved economic position meanwhile made such reforms less pressing.

Manning led Social Credit to a third term in government with a resounding victory in the 1944 election, winning 85 per cent of the seats with just over 50 per cent of the popular vote on the first count of ballots. Preferential voting was used, under Single transferable voting in the cities and Instant-runoff voting elsewhere.

The Co-operative Commonwealth Federation entered the election with only one seat in the legislature belonging to party leader Elmer Roper who had won a 1942 by-election. Despite winning almost a quarter of the popular vote the party won only two seats in the general election.

The Conservative party and former United Farmers continued their strategy of running joint candidates as Independents. Not supported by the Liberals, who left the coalition, the anti-SC joint effort lost much of its previous share of the popular vote. The Liberal Party though did not run candidate under its own banner in this election.

Albertan servicemen and veterans from World War II were able to vote in the first phase of the election on August 4, 1944. There was also a second vote held to elect three Canadian Armed Forces representatives from amongst the Albertans who were in active service overseas, or those who missed the first vote.

This provincial election, like the previous four, saw district-level proportional representation (Single transferable voting) used to elect the MLAs of Edmonton and Calgary. City-wide districts were used to elect multiple MLAs in the cities. All the other MLAs were elected in single-member districts through Instant-runoff voting. All voters in the province had the opportunity to cast ranked ballots. The Army, Navy and Air Force members were elected through single-winner first-past-the-post voting.

== The campaign ==
The 1944 election, was the first general election contested by Premier Ernest Manning. Manning had taken over the Social Credit Party from William Aberhart who died unexpectedly a year earlier. Social Credit faced opposition from the Independents led by James Walker who had also just been elected leader and the Cooperative Commonwealth Federation who had just managed to win a seat in a by-election in Edmonton and win a majority in the 1944 Saskatchewan general election. Like Social Credit and the Independents they were also contesting their first general election with new leader Elmer Roper.

The stage for the general election was set when Social Credit won a critical by-election in Red Deer in December 1943. The by-election win gave momentum to Social Credit as they picked it up from the Independents. After the election they decided to speed up their plans and hold the election in the summer time.

Two major changes occurred this election with the way that votes were to be counted and who could vote. Ballots in single member electoral districts were now allowed to be marked with an "X" to indicate a first choice preference. Prior to this election high numbers of ballots had been declared as spoiled because they were not marked with a "1". Preferences beyond the first choice still had to be marked with a number indicating that preference. The 1944 election also marked the first time that Japanese Canadians resident in Alberta were eligible to vote in a provincial election. There were two thousand Japanese who had previously been moved from British Columbia to Alberta under wartime provisions. Although they had been here (involuntarily in some cases) more than a year and were not barred on racial grounds from voting, they were denied the right to vote because the status of their residency was of a temporary nature according to election officials.

After the writ was dropped, Manning pushed the election as a referendum on the future of the Cooperative Commonwealth Federation party. Independent candidates (pushed forward by the Conservative and Liberal parties who were absent from the election) and Social Credit asked their supporters to mark their first and second preferences for candidates of their parties to try to ensure the CCF was not elected.

=== Social Credit ===
The Social Credit government had been re-elected with a thin majority government in 1940 after failing to fulfill many of its promises of monetary reform whose popularity had allowed it to sweep to power in the 1935 election. The party was also rising in popularity since Ernest Manning became Premier in 1943 after the death of William Aberhart. Manning steered the party away from its previous policies that included Social Credit monetary theory and media control.

The centrepiece of Social Credit's policy in this election was a plan on refunding Alberta's large debt that had been built up under the Liberal and by the United Farmer and Social Credit governments during the Depression.

=== Independent Movement ===
The Independent Citizen's Association, led into the election by James Walker, had been organized as a coalition of Conservatives, Liberals and United Farmers who grouped together to try to defeat the Social Credit government in late 1930s and in the 1940 election. Despite being an organized party, its candidates are often identified as independents. The coalition weakened when the Alberta Liberal Party left just before the 4th Legislative Session opened in February 1944. Despite the split, the Liberal party did not run candidates under its own name in the 1944 election.

Walker was elected leader of the Independent Citizens Association at a convention held in Calgary on January 23, 1944. He defeated David Elton in a two-way contest. There was considerable interest in the convention as over 300 delegates from across Alberta showed up to vote. Walker was elected on the first ballot winning a decisive victory. This was the first time since the Association had been created that a permanent leader was selected.

In 1944, four ICA candidates ran in Edmonton; three in Calgary.

=== Cooperative Commonwealth Federation (CCF) ===
The left-leaning Cooperative Commonwealth Federation had enjoyed tremendous growth over the previous couple of years. In 1942 the provincial branch reorganized at a convention in Edmonton and merged the provincial branch of the Canadian Labor Party into the CCF. Prior to that date the two parties had been affiliated but had operated separately. After the merger the party won an Edmonton by-election on September 22, 1942, to elect their leader Elmer Roper to the Assembly. Shortly before the writs were dropped in this election the Saskatchewan CCF swept the 1944 Saskatchewan general election. Manning called the general election to defuse a possible surge in support for the CCF.

The CCF provincially had struck a deal with the Labor Progressive Party (the Communist Party) to run fusion candidates in some electoral districts. The first time this agreement was put to work was in the December 1943 Red Deer by-election where James MacPherson, LPP leader, endorsed CCF candidate E.P. Johns.

The 1944 election was the first provincial election where the CCF fielded a full slate of candidates. It was the only party in 1944 to do so other than Social Credit. (There was no need for fusion candidates or restriction on running too many candidates as transferable votes used at that time in all districts in Alberta avoided the harmful effects of vote splitting.) Newly elected Saskatchewan premier Tommy Douglas came to Calgary and Edmonton to speak during the campaign.

CCF leader Elmer Roper was quoted in Edmonton Bulletin that if elected, the first thing a CCF government would do is take over Calgary Power.

=== Labor-Progressive Party ===
The LPP had contested elections previously under the Communist banner, but had changed its name to be in line with the federal party, after they had all been outlawed.

The Labor-Progressive Party, led by James MacPherson, aimed to run candidates in the major cities and in mining communities. They did run 30 candidates.

In some electoral districts where LPP candidates did not run, the LPP and the CCF ran fusion candidates. A proposal by the Labor Progressive Party to run fusion candidates with the Cooperative Commonwealth Federation at the federal level was rejected by the national council.

=== Farmer-Labor ===
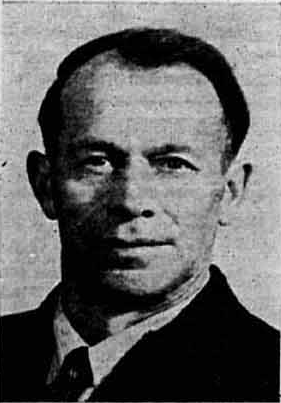
Victor Johanson Farmer-Labor Leader

The Farmer-Labor election committee was a minor political party created by Victor Johanson. He was a farmer residing near the small town of Bentley, Alberta. Johanson was originally selected as a fusion candidate for the Labor Progressive Party and Cooperative Commonwealth Federation to contest the Rocky Mountain House electoral district.

Shortly before the general election was called, the Rocky Mountain House CCF constituency association broke away and voted not to support Johanson and to nominate its own candidate instead.

Johanson then created his own Farmer-Labor banner that he and his supporters operated under.

Johanson's Farmer-Labor banner was the least successful of the four single-candidate parties that operated in the general election (the other three were the Veterans' and Active Force party; the Single Tax party; and Labour United). Johanson finished last in his district and in the provincial standings, winning just 0.13% of the total vote in the province. After the election Johanson did not contest another provincial election, effectively ending the party.

Farmer-Labor's 1944 election platform had seven policy planks. These planks covered primarily local issues to appeal to coal miners working and living at Nordegg, Alberta. Crop insurance and raised commodity prices was also promised to appeal to area farmers. Other policy planks promised help to veterans returning from the war and improvements for local transportation infrastructure.

Farmer-Labor Platform

- Adequate prices for all farm produce.
- Better system for providing for crop losses and improvement in the Prairie Farmers' Assistance Act.
- More liberal grants for roads in rural areas, based on funds collected from car and truck licenses and taxes collected from gasoline sales in each district.
- A hard-surfaced road to the company town of Nordegg. Labor Legislation and a Labor Code of Rights to be administered by the Minister of Labor.
- Old age pensions at a younger age, regardless of property owned. A more liberal monthly pay so that the pensioners can enjoy a better life then at present.
- Rehabilitation of the Armed Forces in Peacetime Production and a higher standard of living than in the past.
- Better opportunities for the youth in the post-war years.

=== Election night ===
On election night Manning's Social Credit party won a landslide victory with 52 per cent of the first preference vote.

Mixture of Social Credit and Opposition MLAs were elected in Calgary and Edmonton, where STV ensured proportional results, and Social Credit swept the rural districts. In almost all the rural districts, the SC candidate took a majority of votes in the First Count and that person was declared elected. But in others, where the SC candidate did not take a majority of the votes in the First Count, vote transfer(s) were conducted as per the Alternative Voting system and in each case the Social Credit candidate was elected. Except for Banff-Cochrane, the final winner in each single-member district was the same as would have won under first past the post. In Banff-Cochrane, the leader in the first count was an Independent Movement candidate but when votes were transferred from the eliminated CCF candidate, most of the votes went to the SC candidate.

The anti-SC coalition Independents did not run a candidate in every riding and were seen by the voters as lacking credibility. Most of their voters swung to Social Credit as a strategic vote to prevent the Cooperative Commonwealth Federation party from electing members.

The anti-SC coalition had lost its whipping boy, William Aberhart. The 1944 election was fought mostly as a two-party contest between the conservative Ernest Manning government and the leftist CCF, which was relatively popular due to wartime anti-fascist sentiment.

The opposition parties conceded defeat just twenty six minutes after the polls closed.

== Key races ==
=== Edmonton ===
The Edmonton electoral district elected five members by single transferable vote. Twenty candidates ran in the district including four party leaders. Social Credit leader Ernest Manning, who had been appointed premier in 1943, was easily the most recognizable candidate in the field. Elmer Roper, CCF leader, had won a seat in Edmonton almost two years earlier in a by-election and was running for re-election. The other party leaders were James MacPherson, of the Labor Progressive Party, and William J. Williams, of the Veterans' and Active Force group.

Manning won his seat in the First Count. It took 16 vote transfers to fill the last seat but in the end candidates of four different groups were elected to represent Edmonton - 2 SC (including leader Manning), 1 (anti-SC Independent of the Independent Citizens Aassociation), 1 CCF (leader Roper) and Williams, leader and sole candidate of the Veterans and Active Force group. The three opposition MLAs elected in Edmonton joined with three elected in Calgary. Those six were the only opposition MLAs elected to the Legislature in this election.

=== Red Deer ===
The results of the December 1943 by-election in Red Deer had led Social Credit government to speed up plans for the general election. Incumbent Social Credit MLA David Ure was running for his second term in office.He was elected, taking majority of votes on the first count.

=== Rocky Mountain House ===
Farmer-Labor candidate and leader Victor Johanson was nominated at a joint Cooperative Commonwealth Federation/Labor Progressive convention on February 17, 1944. Shortly before the election the CCF riding association broke off and nominated candidate George Morrison to run under their banner. Incumbent Social Credit MLA Alfred Hooke was running for re-election. He had been appointed by Premier Manning as Provincial Secretary, when he had formed his cabinet in 1943, after Aberhart's death. The Independents did not nominate a candidate in this riding. On election night Hooke was easily re-elected, winning a majority of the votes on the first count.

=== Warner ===
The Warner electoral district was hotly contested by Independent leader James Walker and Provincial Treasurer Solon Low. Low had been defeated by Walker in the 1940 general election and won a by-election held in the Vegreville electoral district on June 20, 1940. The field of candidates was rounded out by W.M. Madge who ran under the Single Tax banner and R.B. Eshorn of the CCF. On election night, Low won a stunning first count victory, taking a majority of the votes first off and defeating Walker, Madge and Eshorn.

== Results ==
Elections to the 10th Alberta Legislative Assembly (1944)
| Party | Leader | Candidates | First-preference votes | | | | Seats | | |
| Party | Leader | Candidates | Votes | ± | % Fpv | Change (pp) | 1940 | 1944 | ± |
|---|---|---|---|---|---|---|---|---|---|
| Canadian Armed Forces representatives (Note: One for each branch, elected under first past the post rules) | | | | | | | | | |
| █ Canadian Army | | 22 | 6,125 | | | | | | |
| █ Royal Canadian Air Force | | 7 | 1,207 | | | | | | |
| █ Royal Canadian Navy | | 3 | 653 | | | | | | |
| Military vote | | 32 | 7,985 | 7,985▲ | 2.75 | 2.75 | – | 3 / 60 | 3▲ |
| Social Credit | Ernest C. Manning | 57 | 146,367 | 13,860▲ | 50.46 | 7.56 | 36 | 51 / 60 | 15▲ |
| Independent Movement | James H. Walker | 36 | 47,239 | 83,364▼ | 16.28 | -26.00 | 19 | 3 / 60 | 16▼ |
| Co-operative Commonwealth | Elmer Roper | 57 | 70,307 | 35,991▲ | 24.24 | 13.13 | – | 2 / 60 | 2▲ |
| Veteran's & Active Force | William Williams | 1 | 3,532 | 3,532▲ | 1.22 | 1.22 | – | 1 / 60 | 1▲ |
| Labor-Progressive (Note: compared against 1940 Communist results) | James A. MacPherson | 30 | 12,003 | 10,936▲ | 4.14 | 3.79 | – | 0 / 60 | – |
| Liberal | | Did not campaign | | | | -0.89 | 1 | 0 / 60 | 1▼ |
| Labour | | Did not campaign | | | | -1.05 | 1 | 0 / 60 | 1▼ |
| Labor United | | 1 | 1,788 | 1,788▲ | 0.62 | | | | |
| Single Tax | | 1 | 480 | 480▲ | 0.16 | | | | |
| Farmer–Labour | | 1 | 390 | 390▲ | 0.13 | | | | |
| Total | | 216 | 290,091 | | 100.00% | | | | |
| Rejected ballots | | | 8,082 | 2,533▼ | | | | | |
| Turnout | | | 298,173 | 21,306▼ | 70.7% | 4.1▼ | | | |
| Registered voters | | | 421,501 | 5,834▼ | | | | | |

== MLAs elected ==
Acadia-Coronation: Clarence Gerhart
Alexandra: Selmer Berg
Athabasca: Gordon Lee
Banff-Cochrane: Arthur Wray
Beaver River: Lucien Maynard
Bow Valley-Empress: Wilson Cain
Bruce: James L. McPherson
Calgary: Fred Anderson
Calgary: Andrew Davison
Calgary: Aylmer Liesemer
Calgary: Howard MacDonald
Calgary: Rose Wilkinson
Camrose: Chester Sayers
Cardston: Nathan Eldon Tanner
Clover Bar: Floyd Baker
Cypress: Edith Thurston
Didsbury: Howard Hammell
Drumheller: Gordon Taylor
Edmonton: Norman James
Edmonton: Ernest Manning
Edmonton: John P. Page
Edmonton: Elmer Roper
Edmonton: William Williams (VAF)
Edson: Norman Willmore
Gleichen: George E. Bell
Grande Prairie: Ira McLaughlin
Grouard: William Fallow
Hand Hills: Wallace Warren Cross
Lac Ste. Anne: Albert Bourcier
Lacombe: Duncan MacMillan
Leduc: Ronald Ansley
Lethbridge: John Landeryou
Little Bow: Peter Dawson
Macleod: James Hartley
Medicine Hat: John Lyle Robinson
Okotoks-High River: Ivan Casey
Olds: Norman E. Cook
Peace River: William Gilliland
Pembina: Robin Jorgenson
Pincher Creek-Crowsnest: Ernest Duke
Ponoka: Ora B. Moore
Red Deer: David Ure
Redwater: James Popil
Rocky Mountain House: Alfred Hooke
St. Albert: Charles Holder
St. Paul: Joseph Beaudry
Sedgewick: Albert Fee
Spirit River: Henry DeBolt
Stettler: William S. Mackie
Stony Plain: Cornelia Wood
Taber: Roy S. Lee
Vegreville: Michael Ponich
Vermilion: William Cornish
Wainwright: William Masson
Warner: Solon Low
Wetaskiwin: John Wingblade
Willingdon: William Tomyn

Servicemember MLAs

Army: James Harper Prowse
Air Force: Frederick C. Colborne
Navy: Loftus Dudley Ward

=== Synopsis of results ===
Results by riding – 1944 Alberta general election (all except Calgary, Edmonton and servicemember MLAs)
| Riding | First-preference votes | | | | | | Turnout (Note: including spoilt ballots) | Final counts | | | | Winning party | |
| Name | SC | CCF | IndM | LPP | Oth | Total | Turnout | SC | CCF | IndM | Lab | 1940 | 1944 |
|---|---|---|---|---|---|---|---|---|---|---|---|---|---|
| Acadia-Coronation | 2,930 | 1,215 | 595 | – | – | 4,740 | 82.3% | Elected on 1st count | | | | SC | SC |
| Alexandra | 2,212 | 1,504 | – | 151 | – | 3,867 | 65.9% | Elected on 1st count | | | | SC | SC |
| Athabasca | 2,288 | 1,410 | – | 560 | – | 4,258 | 61.4% | Elected on 1st count | | | | SC | SC |
| Banff-Cochrane | 1,568 | 902 | 1,602 | – | – | 4,072 | 73.5% | 1,805 | – | 1,757 | – | IndM | SC |
| Beaver River | 2,747 | 1,403 | – | 385 | – | 4,535 | 69.5% | Elected on 1st count | | | | SC | SC |
| Bow Valley-Empress | 2,131 | 1,033 | 625 | – | – | 3,789 | 74.3% | Elected on 1st count | | | | SC | SC |
| Bruce | 2,024 | 1,274 | 467 | – | – | 3,765 | 67.2% | Elected on 1st count | | | | SC | SC |
| Camrose | 2,763 | 1,590 | 623 | – | – | 4,976 | 72.1% | Elected on 1st count | | | | SC | SC |
| Cardston | 2,104 | 569 | 592 | – | – | 3,265 | 72.2% | Elected on 1st count | | | | SC | SC |
| Clover Bar | 2,969 | 1,693 | – | – | – | 4,662 | 71.9% | Elected on 1st count | | | | SC | SC |
| Cypress | 1,747 | 705 | 973 | – | – | 3,425 | 74.8% | Elected on 1st count | | | | IndM | SC |
| Didsbury | 2,485 | 728 | 966 | – | – | 4,179 | 70.6% | Elected on 1st count | | | | IndM | SC |
| Drumheller | 2,243 | 671 | – | 713 | – | 3,627 | 78.2% | Elected on 1st count | | | | SC | SC |
| Edson | 2,536 | 1,280 | – | 587 | – | 4,403 | 66.9% | Elected on 1st count | | | | Lab | SC |
| Gleichen | 2,032 | 942 | 1,072 | – | – | 4,046 | 74.8% | Elected on 1st count | | | | IndM | SC |
| Grande Prairie | 2,366 | 1,128 | 736 | – | – | 4,230 | 97.7% | Elected on 1st count | | | | IndM | SC |
| Grouard | 2,612 | 1,560 | – | 387 | – | 4,559 | 67.3% | Elected on 1st count | | | | Lib | SC |
| Hand Hills | 3,125 | 873 | 532 | – | – | 4,530 | 80.5% | Elected on 1st count | | | | SC | SC |
| Lac Ste. Anne | 2,209 | 1,767 | – | – | – | 3,976 | 63.6% | Elected on 1st count | | | | SC | SC |
| Lacombe | 2,442 | 1,324 | 775 | – | – | 4,541 | 73.6% | Elected on 1st count | | | | SC | SC |
| Leduc | 2,764 | 1,186 | – | 155 | – | 4,105 | 67.2% | Elected on 1st count | | | | SC | SC |
| Lethbridge | 2,367 | 1,464 | 2,247 | 219 | – | 6,297 | 69.0% | 2,692 | – | 2,388 | – | IndM | SC |
| Little Bow | 1,958 | 767 | 826 | – | – | 3,551 | 76.3% | Elected on 1st count | | | | SC | SC |
| Macleod | 2,440 | 972 | 989 | 152 | – | 4,553 | 75.4% | Elected on 1st count | | | | SC | SC |
| Medicine Hat | 2,977 | 696 | 1,457 | 536 | – | 5,366 | 71.3% | Elected on 1st count | | | | SC | SC |
| Okotoks-High River | 2,932 | 1,444 | 2,196 | – | – | 6,572 | 67.8% | 3,425 | – | 2,347 | – | IndM | SC |
| Olds | 3,196 | 776 | 832 | – | – | 4,804 | 90.3% | Elected on 1st count | | | | SC | SC |
| Peace River | 2,503 | 940 | 806 | 385 | – | 4,634 | 62.7% | Elected on 1st count | | | | IndM | SC |
| Pembina | 2,400 | 1,498 | 820 | – | – | 4,718 | 71.2% | Elected on 1st count | | | | IndM | SC |
| Pincher Creek-Crowsnest | 2,109 | 962 | – | – | 1,788 | 4,859 | 73.2% | 2,228 | – | – | 1,870 | SC | SC |
| Ponoka | 2,208 | 1,016 | 778 | 237 | – | 4,239 | 72.9% | Elected on 1st count | | | | IndM | SC |
| Red Deer | 3,012 | 1,282 | 1,545 | – | – | 5,839 | 73.1% | Elected on 1st count | | | | IndM | SC |
| Redwater | 2,390 | 817 | – | 882 | – | 4,089 | 68.4% | Elected on 1st count | | | | SC | SC |
| Rocky Mountain House | 2,936 | 1,302 | – | – | 390 | 4,628 | 67.3% | Elected on 1st count | | | | SC | SC |
| St. Albert | 2,097 | 1,222 | 918 | – | – | 4,237 | 68.5% | 2,491 | 1,357 | – | – | IndM | SC |
| St. Paul | 1,851 | 1,503 | – | 771 | – | 4,125 | 63.7% | 1,949 | 1,588 | – | – | SC | SC |
| Sedgewick | 2,793 | 840 | 813 | – | – | 4,446 | 76.0% | Elected on 1st count | | | | SC | SC |
| Spirit River | 1,984 | 1,178 | – | 302 | – | 3,464 | 64.5% | Elected on 1st count | | | | SC | SC |
| Stettler | 2,811 | 1,103 | 760 | – | – | 4,674 | 77.2% | Elected on 1st count | | | | SC | SC |
| Stony Plain | 2,557 | 1,371 | – | – | – | 3,928 | 70.0% | Elected on 1st count | | | | SC | SC |
| Taber | 2,490 | 679 | 413 | – | – | 3,582 | 73.8% | Elected on 1st count | | | | SC | SC |
| Vegreville | 1,874 | 1,306 | – | 653 | – | 3,833 | 64.7% | 1,923 | 1,493 | – | – | SC | SC |
| Vermilion | 2,239 | 991 | – | 999 | – | 4,229 | 68.2% | Elected on 1st count | | | | SC | SC |
| Wainwright | 2,939 | 1,300 | – | 234 | – | 4,473 | 70.8% | Elected on 1st count | | | | SC | SC |
| Warner | 1,621 | 415 | 629 | – | 480 | 3,145 | 75.1% | Elected on 1st count | | | | IndM | SC |
| Wetaskiwin | 2,700 | 1,259 | 1,007 | 164 | – | 5,130 | 62.2% | Elected on 1st count | | | | SC | SC |
| Willingdon | 1,771 | 1,328 | – | 899 | – | 3,998 | 68.1% | 1,844 | 1,448 | – | – | SC | SC |

= Open seat
= turnout is above provincial average
= Candidate was in previous Legislature
= Incumbent had switched allegiance
= Previously incumbent in another riding
= Not incumbent; was previously elected to the Legislature
= Incumbency arose from by-election gain
= previously an MP in the House of Commons of Canada
= Multiple candidates

=== Multi-member districts ===
| District | Seats won (in order declared) |
|---|---|
| Calgary | |
| Edmonton | VAF |

| | Social Credit |
| | Independent Movement |
| VAF | Veteran's & Active Force |
| | CCF |

= Candidate was in previous Legislature
= First-time MLA

(Liesemer (CCF) was 5th candidate to be elected in Calgary, receiving the least number of votes of the successful candidates.)

== STV and instant-runoff voting analysis ==
=== Exhausted votes ===
Ten districts went beyond first-preference counts in order to determine winning candidates:

Exhausted votes (1944)
| District | Counts | | Exhausted | |
| District | 1st preference | Final | Votes | % of 1st pref |
|---|---|---|---|---|
| Calgary | 39,309 | 36,238 | 3,071 | 7.81 |
| Edmonton | 37,834 | 35,087 | 2,747 | 7.26 |
| Banff-Cochrane | 4,072 | 3,562 | 800 | 12.52 |
| Lethbridge | 6,297 | 5,080 | 1,217 | 19.33 |
| Okotoks-High River | 6,572 | 5,772 | 130 | 19.65 |
| Pincher Creek-Crowsnest | 4,859 | 4,108 | 751 | 15.46 |
| St. Albert | 4,237 | 3,848 | 389 | 9.18 |
| St. Paul | 4,125 | 3,537 | 588 | 14.25 |
| Vegreville | 3,833 | 3,416 | 417 | 10.88 |
| Willingdon | 3,998 | 3,292 | 706 | 17.66 |

In Edmonton and Calgary, a high proportion of the votes that were not exhausted were used to elect a member.

In Edmonton, only 5171 of the active votes (only 12 per cent of valid votes) were not used to elect the winners. These were the votes received by Kennedy, the only candidate not to be either elected or eliminated.

In Calgary, only 3608 of the active votes (only 9 per cent of valid votes) were not used to elect the winners. These were the votes received by Robert Alderman, the only candidate not to be either elected or eliminated.

=== Calgary ===
All parties other than the Independent Movement fielded full slates.

| Party | Candidates | | | MLAs elected | | |
| Party | 1944 | 1940 | ± | 1944 | 1940 | ± |
|---|---|---|---|---|---|---|
| Independent Movement | 4 | 6 | 2▼ | 2 | 3 | 3▼ |
| Social Credit | 5 | 4 | 1▲ | 2 | 2 | Steady |
| Co-operative Commonwealth | 5 | 2 | 3▲ | 1 | – | 1▲ |
| Independent Labour | – | 1 | 1▼ | – | – | – |
| Independent | – | 1 | 1▼ | – | – | – |
| Labor-Progressive | 5 | – | 5▲ | – | – | – |
| Total | 19 | 14 | 5▲ | 5 | 5 | Steady |

Calgary (1944 Alberta general election) (five members elected, candidates ranked in order of 1st preference)
| Party | Candidate | FPv% | Count | | | | | | | | | | | | | | | | |
| Party | Candidate | FPv% | 1 | 2 | 3 | 4 | 5 | 6 | 7 | 8 | 9 | 10 | 11 | 12 | 13 | 14 | 15 | 16 | 17 |
|---|---|---|---|---|---|---|---|---|---|---|---|---|---|---|---|---|---|---|---|
| Independent Movement | Andrew Davison | 19.73% | 7,754 | 6560 | | | | | | | | | | | | | | | |
| Social Credit | Fred Anderson | 16.93% | 6,655 | 6,655 | 6,558 | | | | | | | | | | | | | | |
| Social Credit | Rose Wilkinson | 12.83% | 5,042 | 5,071 | 5,115 | 5,121 | 5,130 | 5,136 | 5,146 | 5,162 | 5,511 | 5,605 | 5,970 | 6,028 | 6,069 | 6,107 | 8,338 | 8038 | |
| Co-operative Commonwealth | Alymer Liesemer | 9.06% | 3,560 | 3,572 | 3,572 | 3,574 | 3,579 | 3,580 | 3,597 | 3,654 | 3,662 | 3,754 | 3,769 | 4,556 | 4,567 | 5,850 | 5,926 | 5,926 | 6,077 |
| Independent Movement | Howard MacDonald | 6.02% | 2,365 | 2,638 | 2,638 | 2,639 | 2,639 | 2,643 | 2,647 | 2,649 | 2,650 | 2,665 | 2,676 | 2,687 | 3,682 | 3,696 | 3,724 | 3,796 | 6,897 |
| Independent Movement | John J. Bowlen | 5.58% | 2,192 | 2,597 | 2,597 | 2,599 | 2,605 | 2,609 | 2,611 | 2,613 | 2,633 | 2,649 | 2,655 | 2,658 | 3,439 | 3,445 | 3,464 | 3,541 | |
| Co-operative Commonwealth | Robert Alderman | 5.31% | 2,088 | 2,096 | 2,096 | 2,098 | 2,104 | 2,106 | 2,107 | 2,355 | 2,364 | 2,405 | 2,426 | 2,873 | 2,892 | 3,456 | 3,494 | 3,556 | 3,608 |
| Co-operative Commonwealth | C.W.J. Helmer | 4.22% | 1,659 | 1,663 | 1,663 | 1,663 | 1,663 | 1,666 | 1,678 | 1,728 | 1,732 | 1,779 | 1,815 | 2,063 | 2,070 | | | | |
| Co-operative Commonwealth | Ken Tory | 3.71% | 1,458 | 1,460 | 1,460 | 1,466 | 1,469 | 1,473 | 1,477 | 1,589 | 1,592 | 1,615 | 1,625 | | | | | | |
| Independent Movement | R.C. Carlile | 3.65% | 1,433 | 1,865 | 1,865 | 1,867 | 1,868 | 1,871 | 1,878 | 1,878 | 1,887 | 1,899 | 1,906 | 1,909 | | | | | |
| Social Credit | Art Larsen | 3.44% | 1,351 | 1,358 | 1,368 | 1,369 | 1,370 | 1,372 | 1,375 | 1,379 | 1,545 | 1,574 | 2,555 | 2,564 | 2,579 | 2,632 | | | |
| Social Credit | Edward Geehan | 2.96% | 1,162 | 1,168 | 1,183 | 1,184 | 1,184 | 1,190 | 1,210 | 1,211 | 1,494 | 1,526 | | | | | | | |
| Social Credit | C.M. Baker | 2.12% | 834 | 840 | 868 | 870 | 873 | 876 | 881 | 886 | | | | | | | | | |
| Co-operative Commonwealth | Herbert Wiertz | 1.28% | 504 | 504 | 504 | 505 | 506 | 510 | 512 | | | | | | | | | | |
| Labor-Progressive | Pat Lenihan | 1.25% | 491 | 493 | 493 | 505 | 547 | 640 | 1,012 | 1,014 | 1,016 | | | | | | | | |
| Labor-Progressive | Lionel Edwards | 0.77% | 304 | 309 | 309 | 317 | 339 | 487 | | | | | | | | | | | |
| Labor-Progressive | Mike Daniels | 0.66% | 258 | 261 | 261 | 262 | 308 | | | | | | | | | | | | |
| Labor-Progressive | Gordon Wray | 0.33% | 128 | 128 | 128 | 148 | | | | | | | | | | | | | |
| Labor-Progressive | Audrey Staples | 0.18% | 71 | 71 | 71 | | | | | | | | | | | | | | |
| Exhausted ballots | | — | — | 8 | 14 | 18 | 21 | 46 | 74 | 87 | 119 | 734 | 807 | 867 | 907 | 1,019 | 1,259 | 2,834 | 3,071 |
Electorate: 62,807 Valid: 39,309 Spoilt: 1,517 Quota: 6,552 Turnout: 40,826 (65.0%)

Calgary (1944 Alberta general election) (analysis of transferred votes, candidates ranked in order of 1st preference)
| Party | Candidate | Maximum round | Maximum votes | Share in maximum round | Maximum votes First round votes Transfer votes |
|---|---|---|---|---|---|
| Independent Movement | Andrew Davison | 1 | 7,754 | 19.73% | |
| Social Credit | Fred Anderson | 1 | 6,655 | 16.93% | |
| Social Credit | Rose Wilkinson | 15 | 8,338 | 21.69% | |
| CCF | Alymer Liesemer | 17 | 6,077 | 15.81% | |
| Independent Movement | Howard MacDonald | 17 | 6,897 | 17.94% | |
| Independent Movement | John J. Bowlen | 16 | 3,541 | 9.21% | |
| CCF | Robert Alderman | 17 | 3,608 | 9.39% | |
| CCF | C.W.J. Helmer | 13 | 2,070 | 5.38% | |
| CCF | Ken Tory | 11 | 1,625 | 4.22% | |
| Independent Movement | R.C. Carlile | 12 | 1,909 | 4.97% | |
| Social Credit | Art Larsen | 14 | 2,632 | 6.85% | |
| Social Credit | Edward Geehan | 10 | 1,526 | 3.96% | |
| Social Credit | C.M. Baker | 8 | 886 | 2.26% | |
| CCF | Herbert Wiertz | 7 | 512 | 1.30% | |
| LPP | Pat Lenihan | 9 | 1,016 | 2.59% | |
| LPP | Lionel Edwards | 6 | 487 | 3.49% | |
| LPP | Mike Daniels | 5 | 308 | 0.78% | |
| LPP | Gordon Wray | 4 | 148 | 0.38% | |
| LPP | Audrey Staples | 3 | 71 | 0.18% | |
| Exhausted votes | | | 3,071 | 7.81% | |

=== Edmonton ===
Three parties had full slates. The Independent Movement presented four candidates, and Williams (V&A.F.) campaigned under his own banner.

| Party | Candidates | | | MLAs elected | | |
| Party | 1944 | 1940 | ± | 1944 | 1940 | ± |
|---|---|---|---|---|---|---|
| Social Credit | 5 | 5 | Steady | 2 | 2 | Steady |
| Co-operative Commonwealth | 5 | 3 | 2▲ | 1 | – | 1▲ |
| Independent Movement | 4 | 7 | 3▼ | 1 | 3 | 2▼ |
| Veteran's & Active Force | 1 | – | 1▲ | 1 | – | 1▲ |
| Labor-Progressive | 5 | 1 | 4▲ | – | – | – |
| Independent Progressive | – | 2 | 2▼ | – | – | – |
| Independent | – | 1 | 1▼ | – | – | – |
| Total | 20 | 19 | 1▲ | 5 | 5 | Steady |

Edmonton (1944 Alberta general election) (five members elected, candidates ranked in order of 1st preference)
| Party | Candidate | FPv% | Count | | | | | | | | | | | | | | | |
| Party | Candidate | FPv% | 1 | 2 | 3 | 4 | 5 | 6 | 7 | 8 | 9 | 10 | 11 | 12 | 13 | 14 | 15 | 16 |
|---|---|---|---|---|---|---|---|---|---|---|---|---|---|---|---|---|---|---|
| Social Credit | Ernest Manning | 37.72% | 14,271 | 6306 | | | | | | | | | | | | | | |
| Co-operative Commonwealth | Elmer Roper | 13.88% | 5,253 | 5,429 | 5,441 | 5,457 | 5,471 | 5,557 | 5,566 | 5,595 | 5,773 | 6,345 | | | | | | |
| Independent Movement | John Percy Page | 12.17% | 4,603 | 4,998 | 5,032 | 5,039 | 5,261 | 5,267 | 5,602 | 5,611 | 5,621 | 5,647 | 5,705 | 5,794 | 5,828 | 7,171 | 6333 | |
| Veterans' and Active Force | William Williams | 9.34% | 3,532 | 3,996 | 4,012 | 4,030 | 4,051 | 4,060 | 4,077 | 4,088 | 4,120 | 4,142 | 4,298 | 4,508 | 4,554 | 4,805 | 5,366 | 5,535 |
| Independent Movement | Johnnie Caine | 3.70% | 1,400 | 1,545 | 1,548 | 1,548 | 1,646 | 1,653 | 1,826 | 1,837 | 1,860 | 1,869 | 1,891 | 1,954 | 1,977 | | | |
| Social Credit | Henry Carrigan | 3.14% | 1,188 | 2,443 | 2,449 | 2,451 | 2,458 | 2,462 | 2,469 | 2,477 | 2,494 | 2,500 | 2,515 | 2,687 | 3,090 | 3,174 | 3,307 | |
| Social Credit | Orvis A. Kennedy | 2.32% | 876 | 3,495 | 3,501 | 3,512 | 3,519 | 3,523 | 3,527 | 3,545 | 3,556 | 3,577 | 3,627 | 3,684 | 4,116 | 4,175 | 4,264 | 5,171 |
| Co-operative Commonwealth | Clifford Lee | 2.26% | 854 | 892 | 896 | 901 | 903 | 957 | 962 | 973 | 1,074 | | | | | | | |
| Social Credit | Norman B. James | 2.06% | 781 | 2,491 | 2,504 | 2,510 | 2,514 | 2,515 | 2,519 | 2,547 | 2,555 | 2,563 | 2,587 | 2,613 | 3,376 | 3,421 | 3,476 | 5,397 |
| Social Credit | John Gillies | 2.00% | 755 | 1,674 | 1,676 | 1,681 | 1,684 | 1,690 | 1,694 | 1,703 | 1,705 | 1,714 | 1,730 | 1,806 | | | | |
| Labor-Progressive | James A. MacPherson | 1.96% | 742 | 774 | 804 | 978 | 980 | 983 | 984 | 1,351 | 1,357 | 1,386 | | | | | | |
| Co-operative Commonwealth | James Enright | 1.72% | 649 | 684 | 688 | 689 | 690 | 989 | 999 | 1,006 | 1,233 | 1,531 | 1,624 | | | | | |
| Co-operative Commonwealth | M. E. Butterworth | 1.45% | 549 | 578 | 578 | 581 | 584 | 635 | 638 | 642 | | | | | | | | |
| Co-operative Commonwealth | Joseph Dowler | 1.44% | 545 | 557 | 560 | 562 | 565 | | | | | | | | | | | |
| Labor-Progressive | William Halina | 1.31% | 496 | 512 | 547 | 585 | 586 | 590 | 594 | | | | | | | | | |
| Independent Movement | Cecil Chapman | 1.26% | 476 | 509 | 510 | 510 | 580 | 584 | | | | | | | | | | |
| Independent Movement | Clarence Richards | 1.12% | 422 | 458 | 463 | 463 | | | | | | | | | | | | |
| Labor-Progressive | Jan Lakeman | 0.66% | 251 | 270 | 302 | | | | | | | | | | | | | |
| Labor-Progressive | Alex Herd | 0.31% | 119 | 125 | | | | | | | | | | | | | | |
| Labor-Progressive | G.V. Murdoch | 0.19% | 72 | 98 | | | | | | | | | | | | | | |
| Exhausted ballots | | — | — | 0 | 17 | 31 | 36 | 63 | 71 | 153 | 180 | 254 | 1,206 | 2,137 | 2,242 | 2,437 | 2,437 | 2,747 |
Electorate: 65,651 Valid: 37,834 Spoilt: 2,213 Quota: 6,306 Turnout: 40,047 (61.0%)

Edmonton (1944 Alberta general election) (analysis of transferred votes, candidates ranked in order of 1st preference)
| Party | Candidate | Maximum round | Maximum votes | Share in maximum round | Maximum votes First round votes Transfer votes |
|---|---|---|---|---|---|
| Social Credit | Ernest Manning | 1 | 14,271 | 37.72% | |
| CCF | Elmer Roper | 10 | 6,345 | 16.88% | |
| Independent Movement | John Percy Page | 14 | 7,171 | 20.26% | |
| Veterans' and Active Force | William Williams | 16 | 5,535 | 15.78% | |
| Independent Movement | Johnnie Caine | 13 | 1,977 | 5.55% | |
| Social Credit | Henry Carrigan | 15 | 3,307 | 9.34% | |
| Social Credit | Orvis A. Kennedy | 16 | 5,171 | 14.74% | |
| CCF | Clifford Lee | 9 | 1,074 | 2.85% | |
| Social Credit | Norman B. James | 16 | 5,397 | 15.38% | |
| Social Credit | John Gillies | 12 | 1,806 | 5.06% | |
| LPP | James A. MacPherson | 10 | 1,386 | 3.69% | |
| CCF | James Enright | 11 | 1,624 | 4.43% | |
| CCF | M. E. Butterworth | 8 | 642 | 1.70% | |
| CCF | Joseph Dowler | 5 | 565 | 1.49% | |
| LPP | William Halina | 7 | 594 | 1.57% | |
| Independent Movement | Cecil Chapman | 6 | 584 | 1.55% | |
| Independent Movement | Clarence Richards | 4 | 463 | 1.22% | |
| LPP | Jan Lakeman | 3 | 302 | 0.80% | |
| LPP | Alex Herd | 2 | 125 | 0.33% | |
| LPP | G.V. Murdoch | 2 | 98 | 0.26% | |
| Exhausted votes | | | 2,747 | 7.26% | |

== Soldiers' vote ==
The second phase of the general election took place beginning in November 1944 and ending January 1945. Three members of the armed forces commissioned in World War II were elected to represent Alberta service men and women fighting or stationed overseas. In addition those who were in veterans hospitals at the time of the vote and retired service personnel who already returned from duty but missed the August 4, 1944, vote.

The votes for the special seats set aside for Albertans serving in the armed forces were tallied from four geographic areas:

| Area | Description |
|---|---|
| 1 | Canada (outside Alberta), Newfoundland, Bermuda, the United States of America, and any other country not included in the other areas listed. |
| 2 | Italy and all other countries bordering on the Mediterranean Sea (excepting France. |
| 3 | Europe, excepting those countries in Areas 2 and 4. |
| 4 | Great Britain, Northern Ireland and Iceland |

The following votes were received:

| Branch | Area | | | | |
| Branch | 1 | 2 | 3 | 4 | Total |
|---|---|---|---|---|---|
| Army | 673 | 2,388 | 1,972 | 1,092 | 6,125 |
| Air Force | 689 | 18 | 121 | 379 | 1,207 |
| Navy | 419 | 5 | 8 | 221 | 653 |
| Total | 1,781 | 2,411 | 2,101 | 1,692 | 7,985 |

Servicemembers inside Alberta used special ballots for voting in their districts. Only Calgary provided a detailed breakdown.

| District | Party | | | | Total |
| District | SC | CCF | IndM | LPP | Total |
|---|---|---|---|---|---|
| Calgary | 331 | 244 | 192 | 43 | 810 |

Approximately 4,000 military votes were received in Edmonton, but no separate figures were reported in the final results. After 3,000 had been counted, some officials said that the vote was mainly for Social Credit.

This election was not run under the Elections Act and was instead run from an executive council order. This meant that the laws regarding eligibility by age and the Instant runoff voting system did not apply to the armed forces' vote. Saskatchewan was the only other province or state to implement an election for service men in World War II.

The service men vote had been pushed for by the Cooperative Commonwealth Federation (CCF) opposition. Elmer Roper harshly criticized the Social Credit government for having no plans to make voting options available for persons serving overseas.

The Social Credit government responded by announcing that there would be an election of the soldiers' representatives, but it had not decided the date of the vote prior to the first phase of general election being completed.

The soldiers' Members of the Legislative Assembly (MLAs) were meant to be non-partisan and sat on the opposition side of the Assembly. The order in council forebode any candidate running in the election from contesting it along party lines. The vote also temporarily increased the number of seats in the Assembly from 57 to 60. One member represented each branch of the service: Army, Navy and Air Force. This was the second soldiers' wartime vote held in the province's history, the first being the soldiers' and nurses vote held as the second part of the 1917 Alberta general election.

The writ period began in late November 1944. A total of 32 candidates registered to run in the election. The seat provided for the Army was hotly contested with 22 candidates, the Navy had three candidates and the Air Force had 7 candidates. The polls were open a record length of time as the voting was conducted from January 8, 1945, to January 20, 1945. Polling stations were set up on the front lines and at army bases where Albertans were stationed around the world. Four Chief Returning Officers were appointed to conduct the vote, a record that stands to this day. The vote was conducted under First Past the Post rules with no ballot transfers. Elsewhere in the Alberta 1944 election, Instant-runoff voting was used to elect single members, and votes were transferred if necessary because to be elected a successful candidate had to have a majority of votes.

The official results from the vote conducted in Alberta were released on January 31, 1945. The votes for the rest of the world were released on January 6, 1945.

An oddity of this vote is that the Government of Alberta did not print an official document detailing the election results or expenses of operating the election for the general public as it did with the rest of the general election that year. This was because the executive council order made by the Social Credit government did not require it.

Full printing of the official results did appear in both the Calgary Herald and the Calgary Albertan as they were announced by the Chief Electoral Officer at a press conference held in Edmonton on February 5, 1945. The Herald was the only newspaper to break down the results by counting station.

Turnout for this election was generally low; the election came during the closing months of World War II when Germany was on its heels and starting to collapse and the tables had turned for Japanese forces as well. In addition to the heavy fighting there were also large numbers of troops in transit during the voting period. Chief Returning Officer Robert Addison estimated that almost 3,300 Alberta soldiers eligible were unable to vote because of being in transit to various fronts.

The returns themselves were counted in four places, voting conducted in Alberta was counted and released in Edmonton first, while voting conducted overseas was counted in London and sent to Edmonton by telegraph.

The highest turnout came by Army soldiers fighting in Italy and the lowest turnout was in the Mediterranean with only five service-men voting. No statistics were released on how many service men and woman were eligible to vote in total.

Voters for this election were eligible to cast a ballot if they were residents of Alberta for one full calendar year prior to enlisting in the military. The only other eligibility requirement was that they missed casting a ballot in their home electoral district during the first phase of the election.

The Government of Alberta commissioned four Chief Electoral Officers to help run the election. The election proved to be a logistical challenge as no similar election had ever been conducted on a worldwide scale. Robert Addison was in charge of overseeing the election in Edmonton and coordination operations around the world. James Thompson was Chief Returning Office in charge of overseeing the vote in the Mediterranean and the Franco-Belgian Fighting Fronts. A.P. Van Buren was in charge of Canada, United States and Alaska, Newfoundland, Bermuda, Nassau and Jamaica. L.P. Danis was the Chief Returning Officer for France, Belgium and Holland. The jobs of the Chief Electoral Officers included finding out where Albertans were stationed, setting up polling stations, and overseeing collection of ballots. In some cases polling stations were set up directly in the trenches causing delays to the election as election staff came under hostile fire.

Not much is known about the election campaigns, as there was very little information published in the press about the election. The results showed there were no clear front runners in all three races. The Navy vote saw Loftus Dudley Ward hold a lead when the first votes for Alberta were released by the Chief Electoral Officer on January 31, 1945. Ward managed to hang on to win despite getting very few overseas votes. In the Air Force vote, Joseph Roy Burton was marginally leading the field after the Alberta votes were released. On the final total Frederick C. Colborne won with a surge of overseas votes. James Harper Prowse was the biggest surprise in the Army race as he had only 34 votes before surging to win with 1,050 (but just 17 per cent of the votes) by the time the final totals were released.

The result of these elections, conducted using the First past the post voting system, shows the uncertainty of that system. All three winners won with only a minority of the votes cast in their respective constituencies. Prowse won with only 17 per cent of the votes cast by army voters.

=== Results ===
Canadian Army vote official results
| Service rank | Name | Votes | % | Home |
| Captain | James Harper Prowse | 1,050 | 17.14% | Edmonton |
| Lieutenant Colonel | Eric Wyld Cormack | 1,020 | 16.65% | Alix |
| Colonel | E.B. Wilson | 514 | 8.39% | Edmonton |
| Sapper | Eric Joseph Poole | 472 | 7.71% | Red Deer |
| Brigadier M.C. | Gernard Renvoize Bradbrook | 384 | 6.27% | Calgary |
| Captain | James Blakley Corbet | 236 | 3.85% | Edmonton |
| Regimental Quartermaster Sergeant | A. Begg | 224 | 3.66% | Medicine Hat |
| Captain | William Thomas Sabine | 224 | 3.66% | Edmonton |
| Craftsman | Arthur Frank Balfour | 221 | 3.61% | Calgary |
| Sergeant | Clarence Alexander Mumford | 203 | 3.31% | Calgary |
| Corporal | Donald Hugh McLeod | 201 | 3.28% | Calgary |
| Captain | Robert Hugh Miller | 187 | 3.05% | Edmonton |
| Sergeant | Douglas Sterling McLaughlin | 170 | 2.78% | Kinuso |
| Sergeant | Alfred Sigman Brooks | 160 | 2.61% | Purple Springs |
| Major | Wilford Addinell | 157 | 2.56% | Edmonton |
| Lieutenant | James Reginald Dowdell | 120 | 1.96% | Edmonton |
| Squadron Quartermaster Sergeant | David Elliot Scott | 118 | 1.93% | Stony Plain |
| Major | William Graham Ledingham | 110 | 1.80% | Calgary |
| Corporal | Alex Brown Johnston | 106 | 1.73% | Picture Butte |
| Regimental Quartermaster Sergeant | H.A.L. Duffin | 102 | 1.67% | Calgary |
| Warrant Officer Class II | Robert Duncan McIlroy | 92 | 1.50% | Vulcan |
| Support | Bernard LaFleur | 54 | 0.88% | McLennan |
| Total Valid Ballots | | 6,125 | 100% | |

Royal Canadian Air Force vote official results
| Service rank | Name | Votes | % | Home |
| Wing Commander | Frederick C. Colborne | 252 | 20.88% | Calgary |
| Warrant Officer | Joseph Roy Burton | 244 | 20.22% | Edmonton |
| Sergeant | James Melville Bell | 181 | 14.99% | Edmonton |
| Flight Officer | Niel Allen Bell | 178 | 14.75% | Wayne |
| Sergeant | Frank Pierpoint Appleby | 149 | 12.34% | Athabasca |
| Flight Officer | Claude Andrew Cambell | 126 | 10.44% | Edmonton |
| Flight Officer | Harold E. Bronson | 77 | 6.38% | Cherhill |
| Total Valid Ballots | | 1,207 | 100% | |

Royal Canadian Navy vote official results
| Service rank | Name | Votes | % | Home |
| Chief Petty Officer | Loftus Dudley Ward | 293 | 44.87% | Calgary |
| Lieutenant | John P. Dewis | 191 | 29.25% | Canmore |
| Leading Writer | John Francis McVean | 169 | 25.88% | Edmonton |
| Total Valid Ballots | | 653 | 100% | |
