= Frank S. Leffingwell =

Canadian politician

Frank Seth Leffingwell
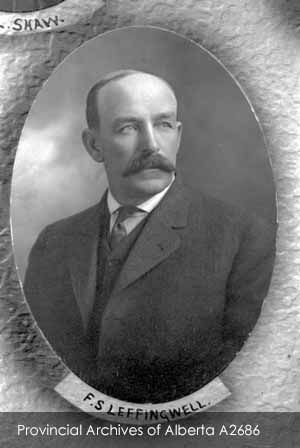

Member of the Legislative Assembly of Alberta
- In office April 17, 1913 – July 18, 1921
- Preceded by: District Established
- Succeeded by: Maurice Conner
- Constituency: Warner

Personal details
- Born: November 16, 1868 Whitewater, Wisconsin
- Died: August 6, 1945 (aged 76) Rochester, Minnesota
- Party: Liberal
- Spouse: Ida May Erdman (m. 1890)
- Occupation: Businessman; politician

Frank Seth Leffingwell (November 16, 1868 – August 6, 1945) was a businessman, stone cutter, horse trader, real estate agent, officer of the law, as well as a municipal and provincial politician who was elected to public office in both the United States and Canada.

== Early life ==
Leffingwell was born on November 16, 1868, in Whitewater, Wisconsin. He married his wife Ida May Erdman on December 24, 1890, and they moved to Benton County, Minnesota. In his early years Leffingwell traded horses and cut granite. Leffingwell joined the Benton County police force and became deputy sheriff in 1898. In 1900 he ran in a 3-way election for the position of sheriff as the Democratic candidate. He won the hotly contested race by 119 votes to become Benton County's new sheriff, defeating incumbent Democratic sheriff Andrew LaVoie. While he was sheriff Leffingwell got into the hotel business; he owned his first hotel The Hotel Foley in Foley, Minnesota, from 1902 to 1906. In November 1906 Leffingwell and his wife moved to Brunton, Alberta, Canada, known today as Warner, Alberta to take part in the great land rush.

== Alberta ==
Leffingwell arrived in Warner, Alberta, to take part in the great land rush; they procured 150,000 acres (610 km^{2}) of land, selling it all to arriving settlers. Leffingwell used his fortune to found the Warner Hotel in 1906. The hotel operated from 1906 to 1927 before it was destroyed by fire. He also helped fund the construction of the first church on the town site the Evangelical church in Warner, and established the Warner Cemetery. Leffingwell continued his active role in politics serving as the town's first mayor. He moved to provincial politics in 1913.

== Provincial politics ==
Leffingwell ran for the Alberta Legislature for the first time in the 1913 Alberta general election. In that election Warner had become big enough to have its own seat represented in the Legislative Assembly of Alberta. Leffingwell became the first member of the Warner, winning a hotly contested 3-way race. Leffingwell was re-elected to his second term in office in the 1917 Alberta general election with a comfortable plurality. He would suffer electoral defeat in the 1921 Alberta general election by Maurice Conner, a candidate from the United Farmers of Alberta.

Leffingwell would run against Conner again in the 1926 Alberta general election, losing half the votes he had during the previous election. After Conner retired in 1935 he attempted to run for office one more time in the 1935 Alberta general election. This time he placed a distant third behind Social Credit candidate Solon Earl Low and James Walker.

Legislative Assembly of Alberta
Preceded by New District	MLA Warner; 1913–1921	Succeeded by Maurice Conner
