= Robert Bogle =

Canadian politician (born 1943)

The Honourable Robert Bogle ECA

Member of the Legislative Assembly of Alberta for Taber-Warner
- In office March 26, 1975 – June 15, 1993
- Preceded by: Douglas Miller
- Succeeded by: Ron Hierath

Personal details
- Born: August 29, 1943 (age 83) Calgary, Alberta
- Party: Progressive Conservative Association of Alberta

Robert John "Bob" Bogle ECA (born August 29, 1943) is a former provincial level politician from Alberta, Canada. He served as a member of the Legislative Assembly of Alberta from 1975 to 1993.

== Political career ==
Bogle first ran for office in the electoral district of Taber-Warner in the 1971 Alberta general election. He was defeated in a hotly contested race by Incumbent Social Credit MLA Douglas Miller. He ran for a second time in the 1975 Alberta general election defeating Social Credit leader Werner Schmidt to win his first term in office. Premier Peter Lougheed appointed Bogle to the cabinet, becoming the youngest member of Lougheed's cabinet. His position was titled Minister without portfolio responsible for native affairs. Bogle ran for his second term in office in 1979 and was re-elected, increasing his majority to 65%, defeating three other candidates. He was then appointed as the Minister of Social Services and Community Health after the 1982 Alberta general election.

In the 1982 Alberta general election, Bogle won a supermajority, defeating three other candidates and winning 71% of the overall popular vote. Following the election he was appointed as the Minister of Utilities and Telecommunications. Prior to the 1986 Alberta general election Bogle announced that he would run again as a private member. He moved his young family from Edmonton to their home in Milk River. In that race he was re-elected comfortably, although his plurality was reduced to 67% Bogle ran for his fifth and final term in office in the 1989 Alberta general election. He was re-elected easily, with his popular vote increasing to 74%, the largest of his electoral career. With Ralph Klein's election as Premier in 1992, Bogle was made Caucus Chairman and Whip. He served the priorities committee of cabinet and participated fully in all cabinet meetings. Bogle retired at dissolution of the Legislative Assembly in 1993.

Legislative Assembly of Alberta
Preceded by Douglas Miller	MLA Taber-Warner; 1975-1993	Succeeded by Ron Hierath
