= Fay Jackson =

Canadian politician

Member of the Legislative Assembly of Alberta
- In office 1940–1944
- Preceded by: August Flamme
- Succeeded by: Edith Thurston
- Constituency: Cypress

Personal details
- Born: December 12, 1894 Mason City, Iowa, United States
- Died: January 31, 1959 (aged 70) Haney, British Columbia, Canada
- Party: None (Independent)

Fay Demont Jackson (February 2, 1888 – January 31, 1959) was a provincial politician from Alberta, Canada. He served as a member of the Legislative Assembly of Alberta from 1940 to 1944, sitting as an independent MLA.

Prior to his election to the legislature, Jackson was a hardware merchant in Etzikom, Alberta, and served on the local school board.
