= Cypress (former Alberta provincial electoral district) =

Defunct provincial electoral district in Alberta, Canada

Coordinates: 49.50°N 110.65°W

Alberta electoral district

Defunct provincial electoral district
- Legislature: Legislative Assembly of Alberta
- District created: 1926
- District abolished: 1986
- First contested: 1926
- Last contested: 1982

Cypress was a provincial electoral district in Alberta, Canada, mandated to return a single member to the Legislative Assembly of Alberta from 1926 to 1986.

== History ==
The Cypress electoral district was formed prior to the 1926 Alberta general election when the Medicine Hat electoral district was split, with the city of Medicine Hat and surrounding area being retained in the Medicine Hat district and the remaining territory from the city to the Canada–United States border forming a new Cypress district.

From 1924 to 1956, the district used instant-runoff voting to elect its MLA.

The Cypress electoral district was abolished prior to the 1986 Alberta general election, with a small portion in the south-east becoming part of Taber-Warner and the remaining portions becoming the Cypress-Redcliff electoral district.

=== Members of the Legislative Assembly (MLAs) ===
Members of the Legislative Assembly for Cypress
Assembly	Years	Member	Party
See Medicine Hat electoral district from 1905-1926
6th	1926–1930	Perren E. Baker	United Farmers
7th	1930–1935	Perren E. Baker	United Farmers
8th	1935–1940	August W. Flamme	Social Credit
9th	1940–1944	Fay D. Jackson	Independent
10th	1944–1948	Edith B. Thurston	Social Credit
11th	1948–1952	James M. Underdahl	Social Credit
12th	1952–1955	James M. Underdahl	Social Credit
13th	1955–1959	Harry E. Strom	Social Credit
14th	1959–1963	Harry E. Strom	Social Credit
15th	1963–1967	Harry E. Strom	Social Credit
16th	1967–1971	Harry E. Strom	Social Credit
17th	1971–1975	Harry E. Strom	Social Credit
18th	1975–1979	Alan W. Hyland	Progressive Conservative
19th	1979–1982	Alan W. Hyland	Progressive Conservative
20th	1982–1986	Alan W. Hyland	Progressive Conservative
See Cypress-Redcliff electoral district from 1986-1993 and Taber-Warner electoral district from 1986-1997

== Election results ==
=== 1926 ===
1926 Alberta general election
Party	Candidate	Votes	%	±%
United Farmers	Perren E. Baker	1,220	57.12%	–
Liberal	H. H. Foster	741	34.69%	–
Conservative	S. Ervine	175	8.19%	–
Total		2,136	–	–
Rejected, spoiled and declined		129	–	–
Eligible electors / turnout		3,072	73.73%	–
United Farmers pickup new district.				
Source(s) Source: "Cypress Official Results 1926 Alberta general election". Alberta Heritage Community Foundation.

=== 1930 ===
1930 Alberta general election
Party	Candidate	Votes	%	±%
United Farmers	Perren E. Baker	1,315	55.37%	-1.75%
Liberal	Robert C. Black	1,060	44.63%	9.94%
Total		2,375	–	–
Rejected, spoiled and declined		110	–	–
Eligible electors / turnout		3,238	76.74%	3.01%
United Farmers hold		Swing		-5.84%
Source(s) Source: "Cypress Official Results 1930 Alberta general election". Alberta Heritage Community Foundation.

=== 1935 ===
1935 Alberta general election
Party	Candidate	Votes	%	±%
Social Credit	August W. Flamme	1,689	54.05%	–
Liberal	Robert C. Black	798	25.54%	-19.10%
United Farmers	Perren E. Baker	587	18.78%	-36.58%
Independent	J. H. Duncan	51	1.63%	–
Total		3,125	–	–
Rejected, spoiled and declined		121	–	–
Eligible electors / turnout		3,909	83.04%	6.29%
Social Credit gain from United Farmers		Swing		8.89%
Source(s) Source: "Cypress Official Results 1935 Alberta general election". Alberta Heritage Community Foundation.

=== 1940 ===
1940 Alberta general election
Party	Candidate	Votes	%	±%
Independent	Fay D. Jackson	2,065	55.33%	–
Social Credit	August W. Flamme	1,667	44.67%	-9.38%
Total		3,732	–	–
Rejected, spoiled and declined		108	–	–
Eligible electors / turnout		5,102	75.26%	-7.77%
Independent gain from Social Credit		Swing		-8.92%
Source(s) Source: "Cypress Official Results 1940 Alberta general election". Alberta Heritage Community Foundation.

=== 1944 ===
1944 Alberta general election
Party	Candidate	Votes	%	±%
Social Credit	Edith B. Thurston	1,747	51.01%	6.34%
Independent	Charles M. Moore	973	28.41%	–
Co-operative Commonwealth	T. A. Reynar	705	20.58%	–
Total		3,425	–	–
Rejected, spoiled and declined		108	–	–
Eligible electors / turnout		4,723	74.80%	-0.46%
Social Credit gain from Independent		Swing		5.97%
Source(s) Source: "Cypress Official Results 1944 Alberta general election". Alberta Heritage Community Foundation.

=== 1948 ===
1948 Alberta general election
Party	Candidate	Votes	%	±%
Social Credit	James M. Underdahl	1,723	57.88%	6.87%
Liberal	Francis J. Halpin	844	28.35%	–
Co-operative Commonwealth	William George McFall	410	13.77%	-6.81%
Total		2,977	–	–
Rejected, spoiled and declined		123	–	–
Eligible electors / turnout		4,476	69.26%	-5.55%
Social Credit hold		Swing		3.46%
Source(s) Source: "Cypress Official Results 1948 Alberta general election". Alberta Heritage Community Foundation.

=== 1952 ===
1952 Alberta general election
Party	Candidate	Votes	%	±%
Social Credit	James M. Underdahl	2,240	68.13%	10.25%
Liberal	Bernhard J. Evenson	1,048	31.87%	3.52%
Total		3,288	–	–
Rejected, spoiled and declined		166	–	–
Eligible electors / turnout		5,645	61.19%	-8.07%
Social Credit hold		Swing		3.36%
Source(s) Source: "Cypress Official Results 1952 Alberta general election". Alberta Heritage Community Foundation.

=== 1955 ===
1955 Alberta general election
Party	Candidate	Votes	%	±%
Social Credit	Harry E. Strom	2,668	68.89%	0.76%
Liberal	John Flaig	1,205	31.11%	-0.76%
Total		3,873	–	–
Rejected, spoiled and declined		167	–	–
Eligible electors / turnout		5,632	71.73%	10.55%
Social Credit hold		Swing		0.76%
Source(s) Source: "Cypress Official Results 1955 Alberta general election". Alberta Heritage Community Foundation.

=== 1959 ===
1959 Alberta general election
Party	Candidate	Votes	%	±%
Social Credit	Harry E. Strom	3,199	79.38%	10.49%
Progressive Conservative	Wayne N. Anderson	831	20.62%	–
Total		4,030	–	–
Rejected, spoiled and declined		15	–	–
Eligible electors / turnout		5,711	70.83%	-0.90%
Social Credit hold		Swing		10.49%
Source(s) Source: "Cypress Official Results 1959 Alberta general election". Alberta Heritage Community Foundation.

=== 1963 ===
1963 Alberta general election
Party	Candidate	Votes	%	±%
Social Credit	Harry E. Strom	3,030	77.87%	-1.51%
Liberal	Alvin H. Reiman	861	22.13%	–
Total		3,891	–	–
Rejected, spoiled and declined		8	–	–
Eligible electors / turnout		5,912	65.95%	-4.88%
Social Credit hold		Swing		-1.51%
Source(s) Source: "Cypress Official Results 1963 Alberta general election". Alberta Heritage Community Foundation.

=== 1967 ===
1967 Alberta general election
Party	Candidate	Votes	%	±%
Social Credit	Harry E. Strom	2,577	77.02%	-0.85%
New Democratic	William G. McFall	769	22.98%	–
Total		3,346	–	–
Rejected, spoiled and declined		16	–	–
Eligible electors / turnout		5,558	60.49%	-5.46%
Social Credit hold		Swing		-0.85%
Source(s) Source: "Cypress Official Results 1967 Alberta general election". Alberta Heritage Community Foundation.

=== 1971 ===
1971 Alberta general election
Party	Candidate	Votes	%	±%
Social Credit	Harry E. Strom	2,777	60.26%	-16.75%
Progressive Conservative	Dave Berntson	1,635	35.48%	–
New Democratic	Tony de Souza	196	4.25%	-18.73%
Total		4,608	–	–
Rejected, spoiled and declined		9	–	–
Eligible electors / turnout		5,860	78.79%	18.30%
Social Credit hold		Swing		-14.63%
Source(s) Source: "Cypress Official Results 1971 Alberta general election". Alberta Heritage Community Foundation.

=== 1975 ===
1975 Alberta general election
Party	Candidate	Votes	%	±%
Progressive Conservative	Alan W. Hyland	2,065	53.32%	17.84%
Social Credit	Barry Berhart	1,447	37.36%	-22.90%
New Democratic	Allen Eng	202	5.22%	0.96%
Independent	Margaret Dragland	159	4.11%	–
Total		3,873	–	–
Rejected, spoiled and declined		8	–	–
Eligible electors / turnout		5,741	67.60%	-11.19%
Progressive Conservative gain from Social Credit		Swing		-4.41%
Source(s) Source: "Cypress Official Results 1975 Alberta general election". Alberta Heritage Community Foundation.

=== 1979 ===
1979 Alberta general election
Party	Candidate	Votes	%	±%
Progressive Conservative	Alan W. Hyland	3,353	57.00%	3.69%
Social Credit	Vern Beck	1,907	32.42%	-4.94%
New Democratic	Clarence Smith	499	8.48%	3.27%
Liberal	Carl Pattison	123	2.09%	–
Total		5,882	–	–
Rejected, spoiled and declined		11	–	–
Eligible electors / turnout		8,767	67.22%	-0.38%
Progressive Conservative hold		Swing		4.31%
Source(s) Source: "Cypress Official Results 1979 Alberta general election". Alberta Heritage Community Foundation.

=== 1982 ===
1982 Alberta general election
Party	Candidate	Votes	%	±%
Progressive Conservative	Alan W. Hyland	4,170	64.38%	7.38%
Independent	Orville Reber	1,080	16.67%	–
New Democratic	Rudolf Schempp	637	9.83%	1.35%
Western Canada Concept	Gifford Woodcock	590	9.11%	–
Total		6,477	–	–
Rejected, spoiled and declined		11	–	–
Eligible electors / turnout		9,278	69.93%	2.71%
Progressive Conservative hold		Swing		11.56%
Source(s) Source: "Cypress Official Results 1982 Alberta general election". Alberta Heritage Community Foundation.

== Plebiscite results ==
=== 1957 liquor plebiscite ===
1957 Alberta liquor plebiscite results: Cypress
Question A: Do you approve additional types of outlets for the sale of beer, wine and spirituous liquor subject to a local vote?
Ballot choice	Votes	%
No	1,339	55.13%
Yes	1,090	44.87%
Total votes	2,429	100%
Rejected, spoiled and declined	18	
5,361 eligible electors, turnout 46.64%

On October 30, 1957, a stand-alone plebiscite was held province wide in all 50 of the then current provincial electoral districts in Alberta. The government decided to consult Alberta voters to decide on liquor sales and mixed drinking after a divisive debate in the legislature. The plebiscite was intended to deal with the growing demand for reforming antiquated liquor control laws.

The plebiscite was conducted in two parts. Question A, asked in all districts, asked the voters if the sale of liquor should be expanded in Alberta, while Question B, asked in a handful of districts within the corporate limits of Calgary and Edmonton, asked if men and women should be allowed to drink together in establishments.

Province wide Question A of the plebiscite passed in 33 of the 50 districts while Question B passed in all five districts. Cypress voted against the proposal by a close margin. The voter turnout in the district was almost equal to the province wide average of 46%.

Official district returns were released to the public on December 31, 1957. The Social Credit government in power at the time did not consider the results binding. However the results of the vote led the government to repeal all existing liquor legislation and introduce an entirely new Liquor Act.

Municipal districts lying inside electoral districts that voted against the plebiscite such as Cypress were designated Local Option Zones by the Alberta Liquor Control Board and considered effective dry zones. Business owners who wanted a licence had to petition for a binding municipal plebiscite in order to be granted a licence.

== See also ==
- List of Alberta provincial electoral districts
- Canadian provincial electoral districts
