= Edith Thurston =

Canadian politician

Member of the Alberta Legislative Assembly for Cypress
- In office August 8, 1944 – August 16, 1948
- Preceded by: Fay Jackson
- Succeeded by: James Underdahl

Personal details
- Born: 1882
- Died: April 1, 1970 (aged 87–88)
- Party: Alberta

Edith Beatrice Belcher Thurston (1882–April 1, 1970) was a Canadian politician, who was elected to the Legislative Assembly of Alberta in the 1944 provincial election. She was a member of the Alberta Social Credit Party.
