= James Underdahl =

Canadian politician

Member of the Legislative Assembly of Alberta
- In office 1948–1955
- Preceded by: Edith Thurston
- Succeeded by: Harry Strom
- Constituency: Cypress

Personal details
- Born: February 4, 1894 Towner, North Dakota, U.S.
- Died: October 7, 1968 (aged 74) Lethbridge, Alberta, Canada
- Party: Social Credit

James Martin Underdahl (February 4, 1894 – October 7, 1968) was a provincial politician from Alberta, Canada. He served as a member of the Legislative Assembly of Alberta from 1948 to 1955, sitting with the Social Credit caucus in government.
