= James H. Walker =

Canadian politician

Leader of the Official Opposition in Alberta
- In office February 22, 1941 – April 8, 1941
- Preceded by: Vacant since John Robert Boyle (1926)
- Succeeded by: Alfred Speakman
- In office February 10, 1944 – March 24, 1944
- Preceded by: James Mahaffy
- Succeeded by: John Percy Page

Member of the Legislative Assembly of Alberta
- In office March 21, 1940 – August 7, 1944
- Preceded by: Solon Low
- Succeeded by: Solon Low
- Constituency: Warner

Personal details
- Born: May 31, 1885
- Died: December 1, 1954 (aged 69)
- Party: Independent Movement
- Other political affiliations: United Farmers of Alberta (until 1937)

James H. Walker (May 31, 1885 – December 1, 1954) was a farmer, provincial-level politician and World War I-era soldier. He served as a member of the Legislative Assembly of Alberta from 1940 to 1944. During that time he served as official opposition leader twice and was leader of the Independent Movement.

== Early life ==
Walker served in World War I. He attained the rank of Major and ran in the 1917 Alberta general election soldiers and nurses vote. In that vote he finished in eighth place out of 21 candidates.

He was involved in large scale farming in Raymond, Alberta. He specialized in growing sugar beets, and became chairman of the Beet Growing Industry. He also primarily raised sheep on his farm.

== Political career ==
Walker ran as a United Farmers of Alberta candidate in the 1935 Alberta general election. He was defeated by Social Credit candidate Solon Earl Low He finished a distant second place, but still ahead of incumbent Frank Leffingwell.

Walker ran a second time in the Warner electoral district against Low. He was an Independent candidate this time around and defeated Low.

Walker ran for leadership of the Independent Citizen's Association and defeated David Elton on a first ballot win at Calgary on January 23, 1944. His win made him the first permanent leader of the Independents.

Walker had trouble gaining traction as leader. Prior to the start of the 4th Legislative session, the Independents lost two caucus members who joined Joseph Trembley to sit in the Assembly as Liberals. The Independents, despite knowing about the timing of the 1944 Alberta general election well in advance, did not field a full slate of candidates. The party and Walker were criticized heavily as being unable to form government and unable to be a viable alternative. On elections night, Social Credit under Ernest Manning surged in popularity and the Independents were elected in just three seats.

Walker was personally defeated in his own electoral district by Low and did not run again in provincial elections.

Legislative Assembly of Alberta
Preceded by Solon Earl Low	MLA Warner; 1940–1944	Succeeded by Solon Earl Low
Preceded by John C. Bowen	Leader of the Official Opposition in Alberta; 1941	Succeeded by Alfred Speakman
Preceded by James Mahaffy	Leader of the Official Opposition in Alberta; 1944	Succeeded by John Percy Page
