= Leonard Halmrast =

Canadian politician

Leonard Christian Halmrast
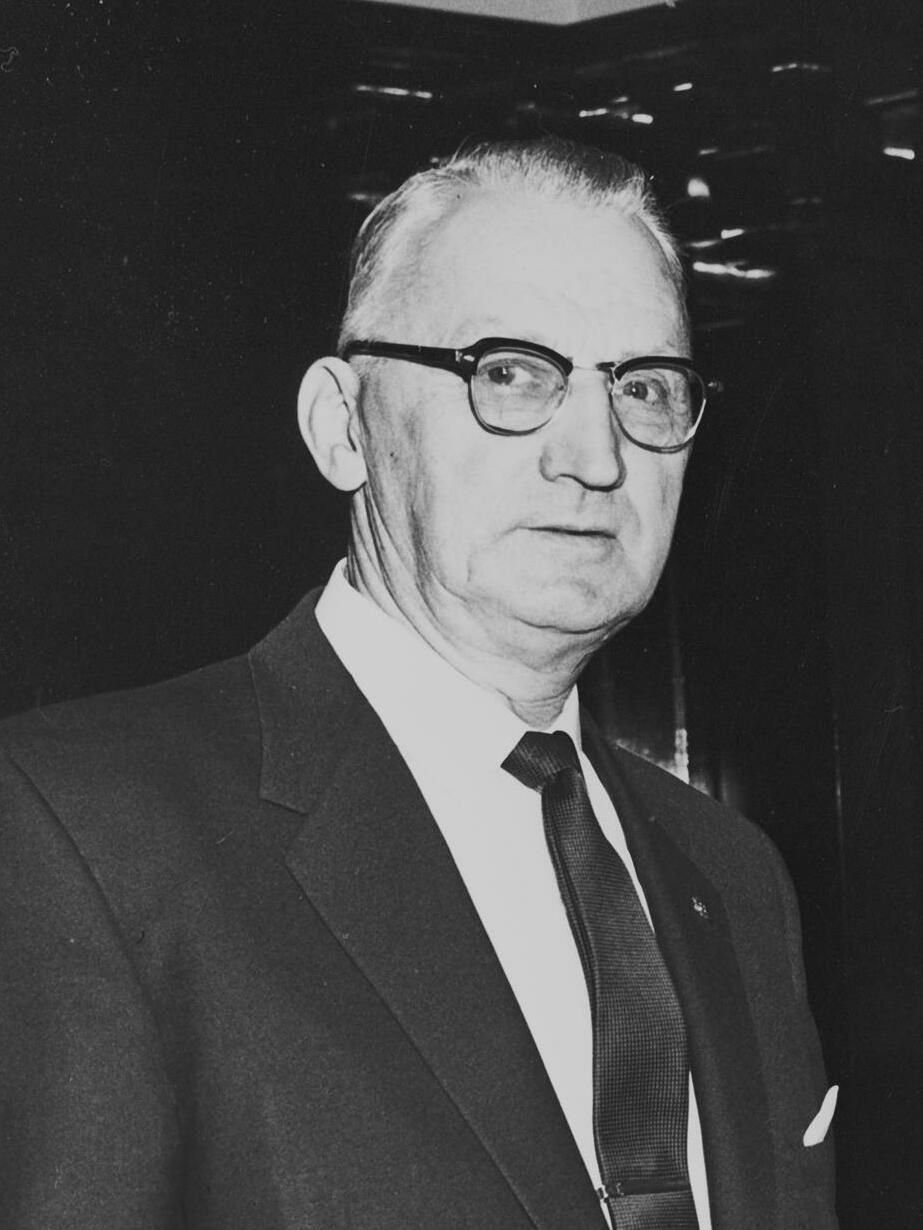
- Halmrast in 1962

Member of the Legislative Assembly of Alberta
- In office August 6, 1945 – June 17, 1963
- Preceded by: Solon Low
- Constituency: Warner
- In office June 17, 1963 – May 23, 1967
- Succeeded by: Douglas Miller
- Constituency: Taber-Warner

Minister of Public Welfare
- In office 1953 – January 5, 1954
- Premier: Ernest Manning
- Preceded by: Wallace Cross
- Succeeded by: Robin Jorgenson
- In office October 15, 1962 – June 29, 1967
- Premier: Ernest Manning
- Preceded by: Robin Jorgenson
- Succeeded by: Alfred Hooke

Minister of Agriculture
- In office January 5, 1954 – October 15, 1962
- Premier: Ernest Manning
- Preceded by: David Ure
- Succeeded by: Harry Strom

Personal details
- Born: October 10, 1899 La Crosse, Wisconsin
- Died: February 7, 1979 (aged 79)
- Party: Social Credit

Leonard Christian Halmrast (October 10, 1899 – February 7, 1979) was a politician from Alberta, Canada. He served in the Legislative Assembly of Alberta from 1945 to 1967 as a member of the Social Credit caucus in government. He held various portfolios in the cabinet of Premier Ernest Manning from 1953 to 1967.

== Political career ==
Halmrast first ran for a seat to the Alberta Legislature as a Social Credit candidate in a by-election held in the electoral district of Warner on August 6, 1945. He defeated H.J. Hierath, who ran as a Single Tax candidate, in a landslide to hold the seat for his party.

In the 1948 general election Halmrast defeated Liberal candidate William Colliton in a two-way race.

In the 1952 general election Halmrast defeated Liberal candidate George Snow by a landslide in his third two-way race in a row.

Premier Ernest Manning appointed Halmrast to his cabinet in 1953. Halmrast served as Minister of Public Welfare until January 5, 1954; he was then appointed Minister of Agriculture.

In the 1955 general election Halmrast defeated Liberal candidate J.L. Evans by a smaller margin than in earlier elections.

In the 1959 general election Halmrast defeated Liberal candidate Mark Stringam in his fifth consecutive straight fight.

On October 15, 1962, Premier Manning shuffled Halmrast back to the Public Welfare portfolio.

Redistribution in 1963 saw the electoral district of Warner merged with Taber to become Taber-Warner. In the election held that year Halmrast was returned to office by acclamation. This was the last time that a candidate was elected unopposed to the Alberta legislature.

Halmrast retired from the assembly at dissolution in 1967.
