= Ron Hierath =

Canadian politician

Member of the Legislative Assembly of Alberta
- In office 1993–2001
- Constituency: Taber-Warner (1993–1997); Cardston-Taber-Warner (1997–2001)

Personal details
- Born: August 17, 1944 (age 82) Milk River, Alberta
- Party: Progressive Conservative Association of Alberta
- Occupation: real estate agent

Ronald Hierath (born August 17, 1944) is a real estate agent and a former politician from Alberta, Canada. He served as a member of the Legislative Assembly of Alberta from 1993 until 2001.

== Early life ==
Ron Hierath was born in Milk River, Alberta. He became a wheat and pig farmer on his family farm and was employed in that line of work for twenty five years. He was also active if a number of farmer interest groups. He was member of the Alberta Grain Commission and the Western Barley Growers Association. He also served on the Board of Directors for the Western Canadian Wheat Growers Association.

== Political career ==
Hierath was elected to the Alberta Legislature for the first time in the 1993 Alberta general election. He held the electoral district of Taber-Warner for the Progressive Conservatives winning by a comfortable margin over three other candidates. His electoral district was abolished upon dissolution for the 1997 Alberta general election and he sought re-election in the new district of Cardston-Taber-Warner. He won re-election with a very large majority. In 2000, Hierath gave a $500,000.00 centennial grant to help restore the Coutts Railway Station at Stirling, Alberta. He retired from public office at the end of his second term when the legislature was dissolved in 2001.

== Late life ==
After retiring from politics, Hierath became a real estate agent in 2003. He founded his own real estate company under the Sutton group in 2005. In January 2007 he joined the board of directors for Farm Credit Canada.

Legislative Assembly of Alberta
Preceded by Robert Bogle	MLA Taber-Warner; 1993–1997	Succeeded by District Abolished
Preceded by New District	MLA Cardston-Taber-Warner; 1997–2001	Succeeded by Broyce Jacobs
