= Loftus Dudley Ward =

Canadian politician

Loftus Dudley Ward, (November 7, 1905 – May 24, 1980), of Calgary, Alberta, served as a Chief Petty Officer in the Royal Canadian Navy during the Second World War and also served as an Alberta MLA from 1944 to 1948.

Ward was elected to the Legislative Assembly of Alberta in the 1944/45 general election. He was one of three members elected to represent the armed forces. Seats in the Alberta Legislature were set aside for three members to represent members of the armed forces (army, navy, and air force). these three members did not represent a specific constituency but instead spoke for the men and women serving overseas in the Second World War, each of them representing a different branch of the service (army, navy, and air force). They had no political affiliation and sat on the opposition side of the House. Ward was elected by 45 percent of the Navy votes cast, to be the representative of Albertans serving in the Royal Canadian Navy.

After switching to the Liberal party, in 1948, he ran for re-election in his home town of Calgary but was not elected.

Legislative Assembly of Alberta
Preceded by New Position	MLA Royal Canadian Navy; 1945–1948	Succeeded by Position Abolished
