= Douglas Miller (Alberta politician) =

Canadian politician

Member of the Legislative Assembly of Alberta
- In office May 23, 1967 – March 25, 1975
- Preceded by: Leonard Halmrast
- Succeeded by: Robert Bogle
- Constituency: Taber-Warner

Personal details
- Born: November 3, 1904 Raymond, Alberta
- Died: July 22, 1982 (aged 77)
- Party: Social Credit

Douglas Miller (November 3, 1904 – July 22, 1982) was a provincial politician from Alberta, Canada. He served as a member of the Legislative Assembly of Alberta from 1967 to 1975 sitting with the Social Credit caucus in both government and opposition.

== Political career ==
Miller ran for a seat to the Alberta Legislature in the 1967 Alberta general election. He was the Social Credit candidate in the electoral district of Taber-Warner and won the seat easily defeating three other candidates.

Miller ran for a second term in office in the 1971 Alberta general election. He faced Progressive Conservative candidate Robert Bogle in a straight fight. The race was close with Miller winning by just over 700 votes.

Miller retired from provincial politics at dissolution of the legislature in 1975.
