= Maurice Conner =

Canadian politician

Maurice Joy Conner
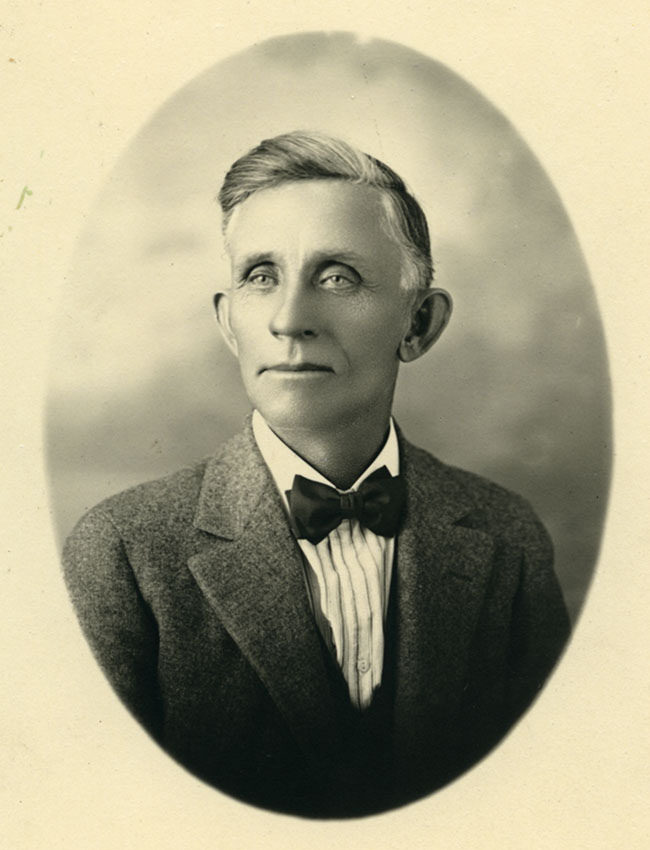

Member of the Legislative Assembly of Alberta
- In office July 19, 1921 – August 22, 1935
- Preceded by: Frank Leffingwell
- Succeeded by: Solon Earl Low
- Constituency: Warner

Personal details
- Born: November 30, 1868; Afton, Iowa
- Died: May 9, 1937 (aged 68); Lethbridge, Alberta
- Political party: United Farmers of Alberta

Maurice Joy Conner (November 30, 1868 – May 9, 1937), sometimes spelled Maurice Joy Connor, was a Canadian politician who served as the member of the Legislative Assembly of Alberta for Warner from 1921 until 1935. Before entering politics, he was a Methodist preacher in the United States. He first sought office in the 1921 Alberta provincial election as a candidate for the United Farmers of Alberta (UFA) in Warner. He defeated Liberal incumbent Frank Leffingwell and became one of 38 UFA candidates elected as the party, which was contesting its first election, won a surprise majority government. He was re-elected in the 1926 and 1930 elections, and did not seek re-election in the 1935 election, when the UFA lost every seat and the new Social Credit League won a majority.

In 1928, Conner abstained from voting on the Sexual Sterilization Act, introduced by Premier John Edward Brownlee's UFA government, and was the only UFA member present not to support the bill.

== Electoral record ==
| 1930 Alberta general election results (Warner) | | Turnout 70.7% | |
| Affiliation | Candidate | Votes | % |
| United Farmers | Maurice Conner | 1,342 | 65.43% |
| Liberal | R. W. Risinger | 709 | 34.57% |
| 1926 Alberta general election results (Warner) | | Turnout 76.4% | |
| Affiliation | Candidate | Votes | % |
| United Farmers | Maurice Conner | 741 | 64.10% |
| Liberal | Frank Leffingwell | 225 | 19.46% |
| Conservative | G. N. Giles | 190 | 16.44% |
| 1921 Alberta general election results (Warner) | | Turnout 74.8% | |
| Affiliation | Candidate | Votes | % |
| United Farmers | Maurice Conner | 755 | 60.64% |
| Liberal | Frank Leffingwell | 490 | 39.36% |
