= Perren Baker =

Canadian politician

Perren Earle Baker
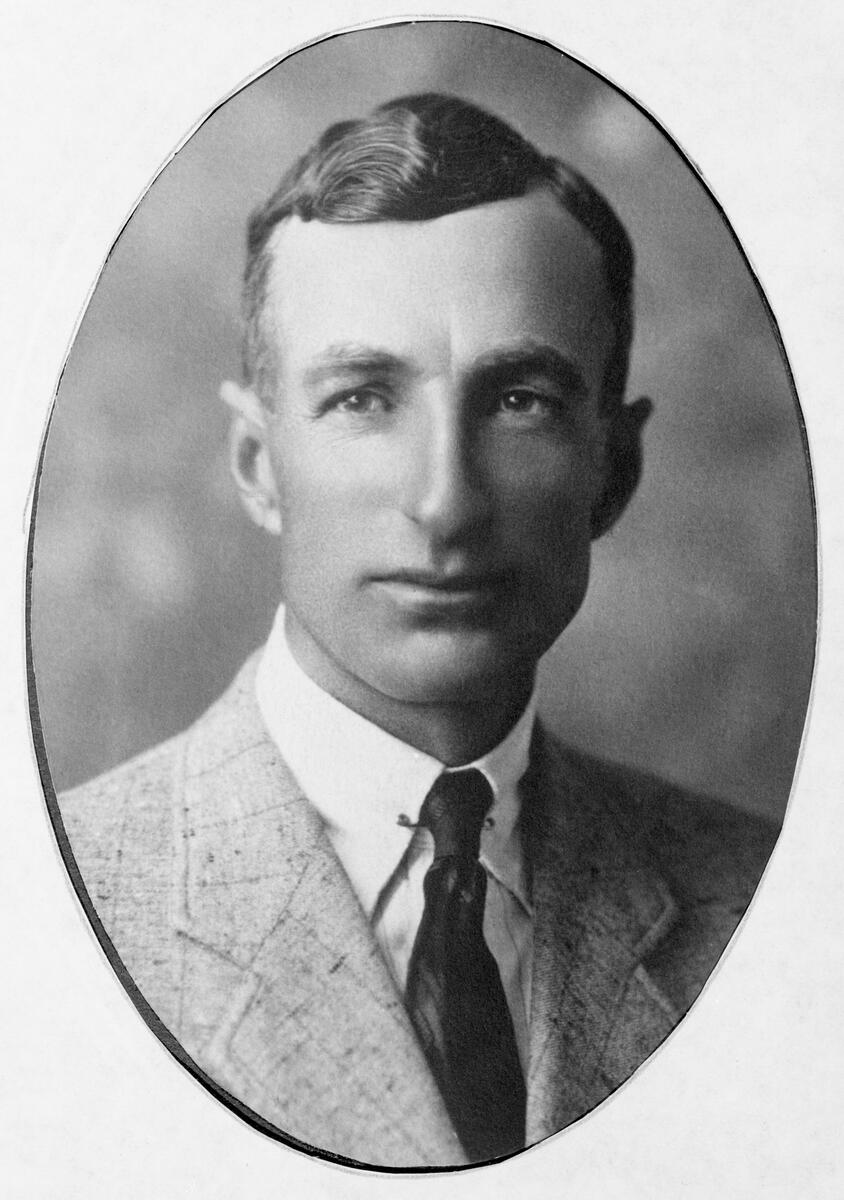
- Baker in 1924

Member of the Legislative Assembly of Alberta
- In office June 28, 1926 – August 22, 1935
- Preceded by: New district
- Succeeded by: August Flamme
- Constituency: Cypress
- In office July 18, 1921 – June 28, 1926 Serving with Charles Pingle (1925–1926); William Johnston (1921–1925)
- Preceded by: Nelson Spencer
- Succeeded by: Charles Pingle
- Constituency: Medicine Hat

Alberta Minister of Education
- In office August 31, 1921 – September 3, 1935
- Preceded by: George P. Smith
- Succeeded by: William Aberhart

Personal details
- Born: August 10, 1877 Blenheim, Ontario
- Died: February 13, 1974 (aged 96) Vancouver, British Columbia
- Party: United Farmers of Alberta
- Spouse(s): Blanche Randall (1905–1916); Edna A. Brown (1920 – c. 1974)
- Children: Albert T. Baker, Elizabeth Baker (Mather), Andrew Baker, Emerson Baker
- Education: McMaster University, University of Chicago
- Occupation: Farmer

Perren Earle Baker (August 10, 1877 – February 13, 1974) was a Canadian politician who served as Alberta's Minister of Education from 1921 until 1935.

== Electoral record ==
1921 Alberta general election: Medicine Hat
Party	Candidate	Votes	%	Elected
United Farmers	Perren E. Baker	4,165	65.52%	✓
Labour	William G. Johnston	3,602	56.66%	✓
Liberal	Oliver Boyd	2,278	35.83%	–
Liberal	H. H. Foster	2,013	31.67%	–
Total		6,357	–	–
Source(s) Source: "Medicine Hat Official Results 1921 Alberta general election". Alberta Heritage Community Foundation. Two members were elected to the Legislature, and electors had the option of voting for up to two candidates.

Alberta provincial by-election, December 9, 1921: Medicine Hat Ministerial by-election upon Perren E. Baker's appointment to Cabinet
Party	Candidate	Votes
United Farmers	Perren E. Baker	Acclaimed
Source(s) "By-elections". elections.ab.ca. Elections Alberta.

1926 Alberta general election: Cypress
Party	Candidate	Votes	%	±%
United Farmers	Perren E. Baker	1,220	57.12%	–
Liberal	H. H. Foster	741	34.69%	–
Conservative	S. Ervine	175	8.19%	–
Total		2,136	–	–
Rejected, spoiled and declined		129	–	–
Eligible electors / turnout		3,072	73.73%	–
United Farmers pickup new district.				
Source(s) Source: "Cypress Official Results 1926 Alberta general election". Alberta Heritage Community Foundation.

1930 Alberta general election: Cypress
Party	Candidate	Votes	%	±%
United Farmers	Perren E. Baker	1,315	55.37%	-1.75%
Liberal	Robert C. Black	1,060	44.63%	9.94%
Total		2,375	–	–
Rejected, spoiled and declined		110	–	–
Eligible electors / turnout		3,238	76.74%	3.01%
United Farmers hold		Swing		-5.84%
Source(s) Source: "Cypress Official Results 1930 Alberta general election". Alberta Heritage Community Foundation.

1935 Alberta general election: Cypress
Party	Candidate	Votes	%	±%
Social Credit	August W. Flamme	1,689	54.05%	–
Liberal	Robert C. Black	798	25.54%	-19.10%
United Farmers	Perren E. Baker	587	18.78%	-36.58%
Independent	J. H. Duncan	51	1.63%	–
Total		3,125	–	–
Rejected, spoiled and declined		121	–	–
Eligible electors / turnout		3,909	83.04%	6.29%
Social Credit gain from United Farmers		Swing		8.89%
Source(s) Source: "Cypress Official Results 1935 Alberta general election". Alberta Heritage Community Foundation.
