= August Flamme =

Canadian politician

August W. Flamme
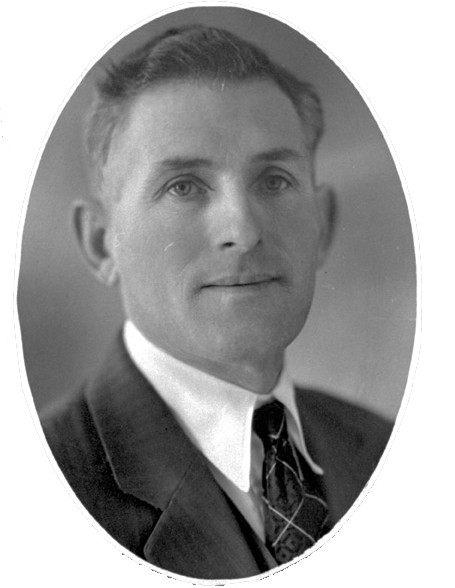

Member of the Legislative Assembly of Alberta
- In office August 22, 1935 – March 21, 1940
- Preceded by: Perren Baker
- Succeeded by: Fay Jackson
- Constituency: Cypress

Personal details
- Born: January 1, 1884 Newton, Iowa, U.S.
- Died: February 13, 1961 (aged 77) Bow Island, Alberta, Canada
- Party: Social Credit
- Occupation: politician

August W. Flamme (January 1, 1884 – February 13, 1961) was a provincial politician from Alberta, Canada. He served as a member of the Legislative Assembly of Alberta from 1935 to 1940 sitting with the Social Credit caucus in government.

== Political career ==
Flamme first ran for a seat to the Alberta Legislature as a Social Credit candidate in the 1935 general election in the electoral district of Cypress. He defeated incumbent Perren Baker and two other candidates in a landslide to pick up the district for his party. In the 1940 general election he was defeated by independent candidate Fay Jackson. He died in 1961 at Bow Island Hospital in Bow Island, Alberta.
