= Elmer Roper =

Canadian politician

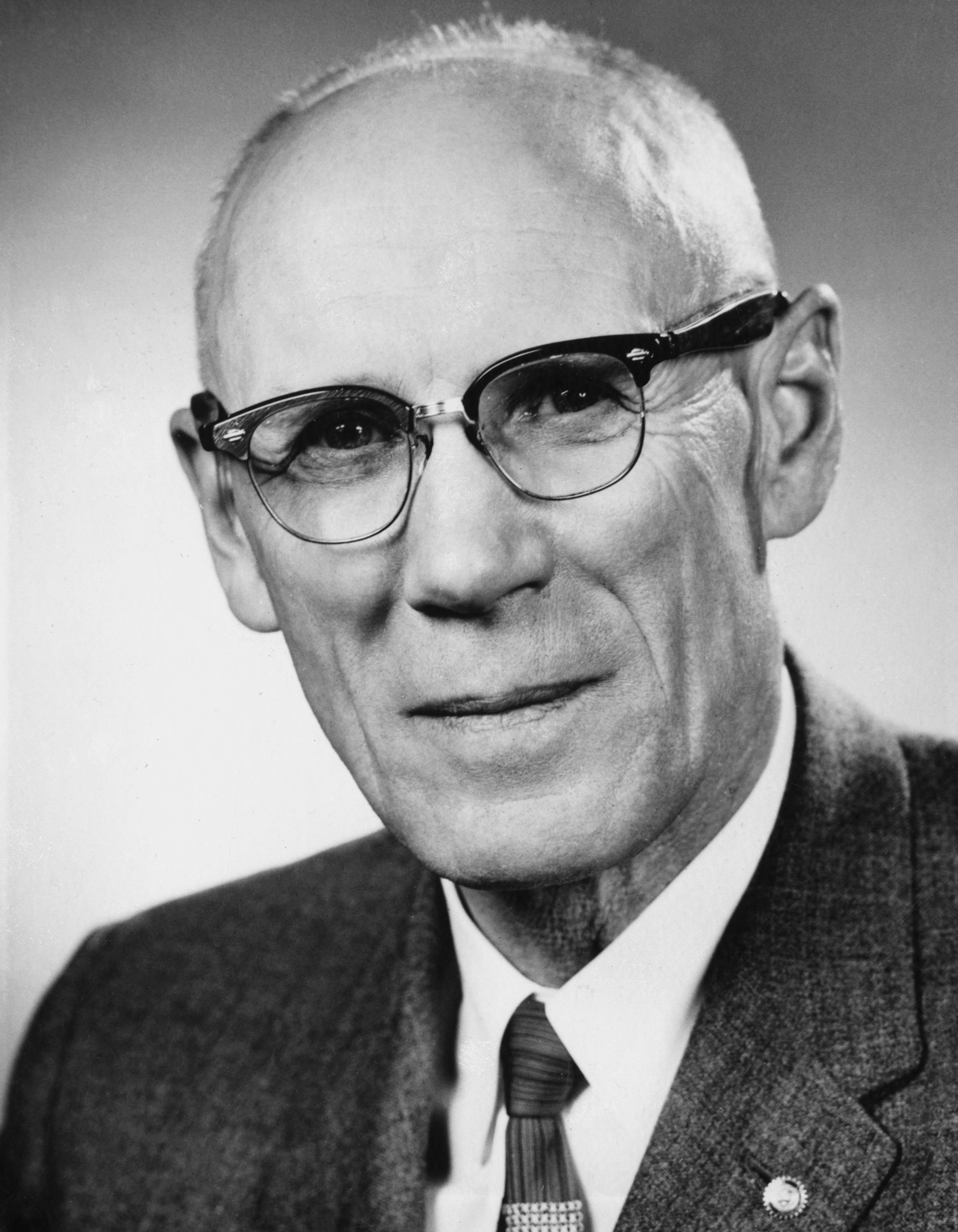
- Roper c. 1962

26th Mayor of Edmonton
- In office October 14, 1959 – October 16, 1963
- Preceded by: Frederick John Mitchell
- Succeeded by: William Hawrelak

Leader of the Alberta Co-operative Commonwealth Federation
- In office 1942–1955
- Preceded by: Chester Ronning
- Succeeded by: Floyd Albin Johnson

Member of the Legislative Assembly of Alberta for Edmonton
- In office September 22, 1942 – June 29, 1955

Personal details
- Born: Elmer Ernest Roper; June 4, 1893 Ingonish, Nova Scotia
- Died: November 12, 1994 (aged 101) Victoria, British Columbia
- Party: Alberta Co-operative Commonwealth Federation, Labour, Citizens Committee, Civic Reform Association
- Other political affiliations: Co-operative Commonwealth Federation
- Spouse: Goldie C. Bell
- Children: Three daughters and one son (G. Lyall Roper)
- Profession: Printer

Elmer Ernest Roper (June 4, 1893 – November 12, 1994) was a Canadian businessman, trade unionist and politician. He was an elected member of the Legislative Assembly of Alberta from 1942 to 1955 as a representative of the Alberta Co-operative Commonwealth Federation party in the city of Edmonton and also served as mayor of Edmonton from 1959 to 1963.

== Early life ==
Roper was born in Ingonish, Nova Scotia, the son of a sea captain. He was educated in Sydney, and moved west to Calgary, Alberta in 1907. There he apprenticed as a printer and found work in the Calgary Herald's press room. On June 15, 1914, he married Goldie C. Bell, with whom he had three daughters and one son and who predeceased him by weeks.

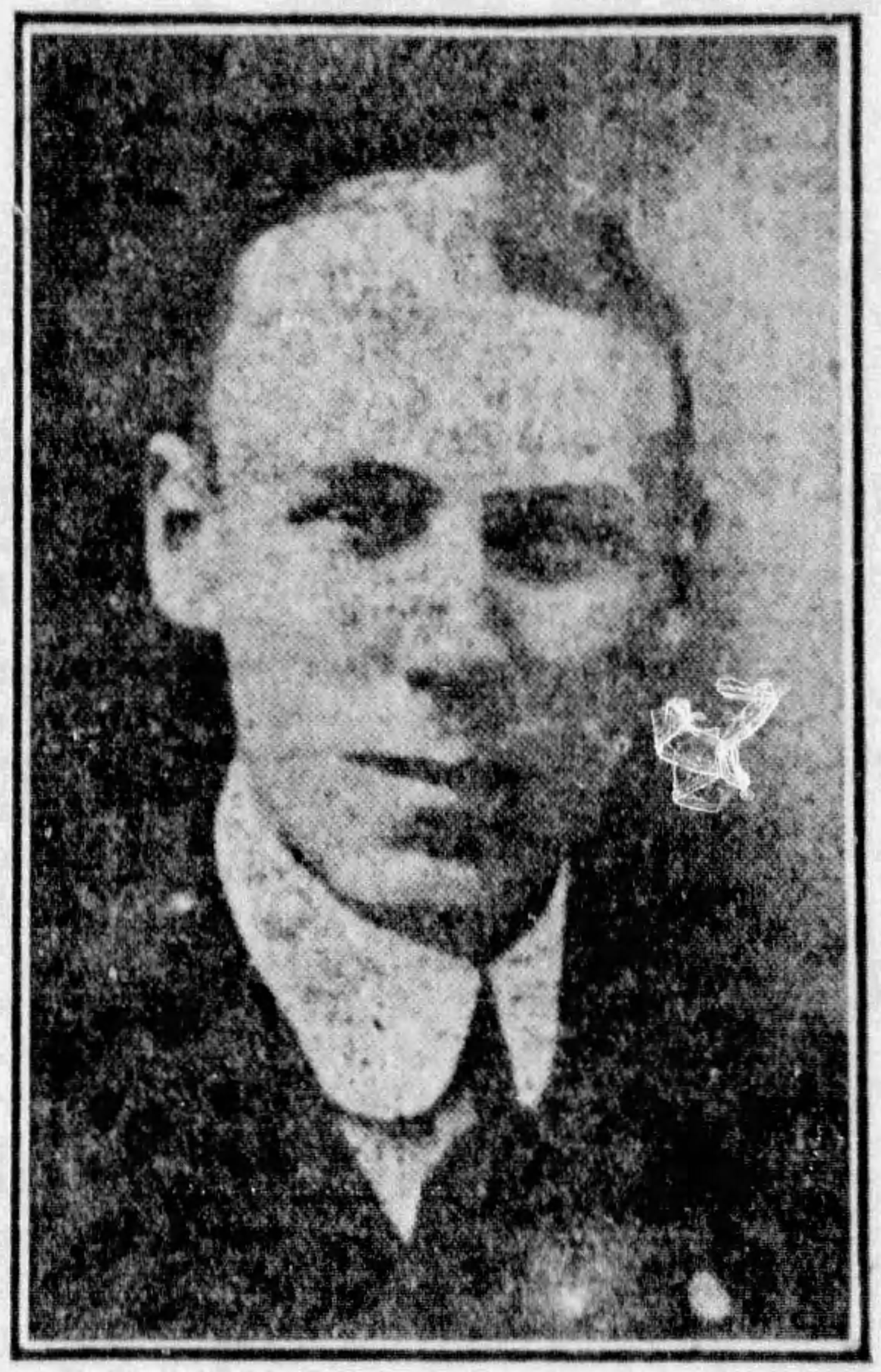
Roper c. 1920

He became involved in the labour movement as a young man. He joined the Pressman's Union. He was president of the Calgary Trades & Labour Council by 1916. His tenure in this position was short-lived, as he moved to Edmonton the following year to become the head of the Edmonton Bulletin's press room. There he took a position of leadership in running the Edmonton District Labour Council (later the Edmonton Trades & Labour Council). Although not a backer of the One Big Union, he was involved in Edmonton's 1919 general strike, a sympathy strike with the Winnipeg General Strike during the post-WWI Canadian Labour Revolt.

In 1921 he left the Bulletin to found his own printing business, which he operated until his retirement. The same year, he made his first bid for elected office.

== Early political career ==
In the 1921 provincial election, Roper ran as a Labour candidate in Edmonton. He was not elected. On the first count he came in thirteenth of twenty-six candidates. (Only five were elected in the Edmonton district.)

In 1922, Roper became secretary-treasurer of the Alberta Federation of Labour. He held the position for a decade. Roper edited the AF of L's official organ Alberta Labour News from 1921 to 1935 when he changed the newspaper's name to People's Weekly and made it the de facto house organ of the new Alberta Co-operative Commonwealth Federation with William Irvine as co-editor.

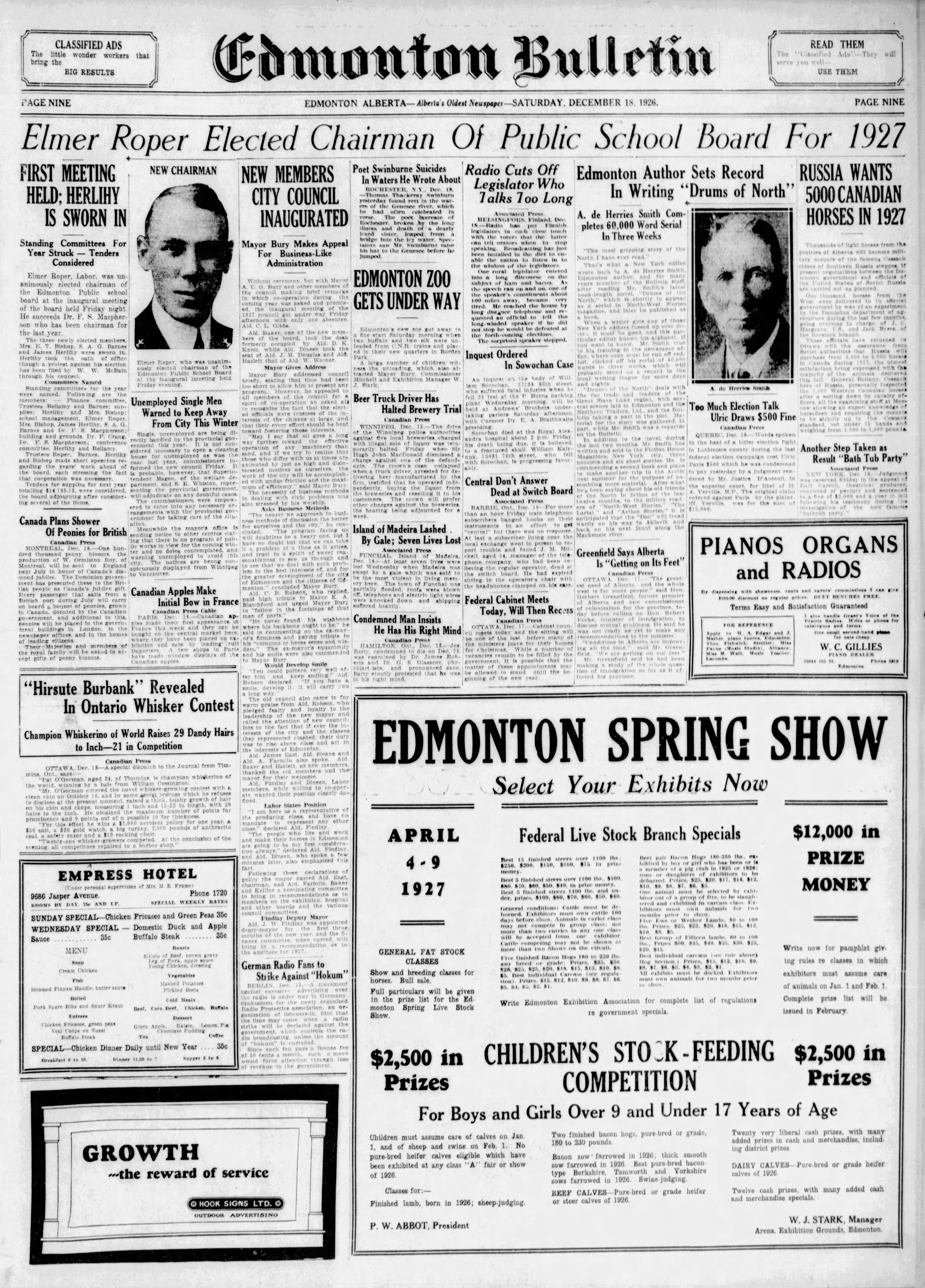
Roper on the front page of the Edmonton Bulletin, December 18, 1926

Roper ran for school trustee in Edmonton's 1924 municipal election. He finished fourth of seven candidates, in an election in which three members were elected using single transferable voting. He tried again in the 1925 Edmonton municipal election, and this time was elected. He again came in fourth of seven candidates on the first count and was elected because he held this position and this time four seats were being filled. He was re-elected in 1927 but did not seek re-election at the expiration of his second term in 1929.

Meanwhile he sought elected office at other levels. In the 1926 provincial election, he was again a Labour candidate in Edmonton. He was less successful on this occasion, finishing sixteenth of eighteen candidates on the first count - only five were being elected. He tried again in a 1931 by-election resulting from the death of Charles Weaver; he came in second of four candidates. Conservative Frederick C. Jamieson reclaimed the seat for Weaver's party.

Roper's lone attempt at federal office took place in the 1935 election, when he ran for the newly formed Co-operative Commonwealth Federation paty in Edmonton East; he finished fourth of six candidates as William Samuel Hall took the riding for the Social Credit Party of Canada.

Roper ran under the CCF banner in the 1940 election. He came in seventh of nineteen candidates on the first ballot and did not improve his position so was defeated once again. No CCF members were elected during that election but that was about to change.

== CCF leader and MLA ==
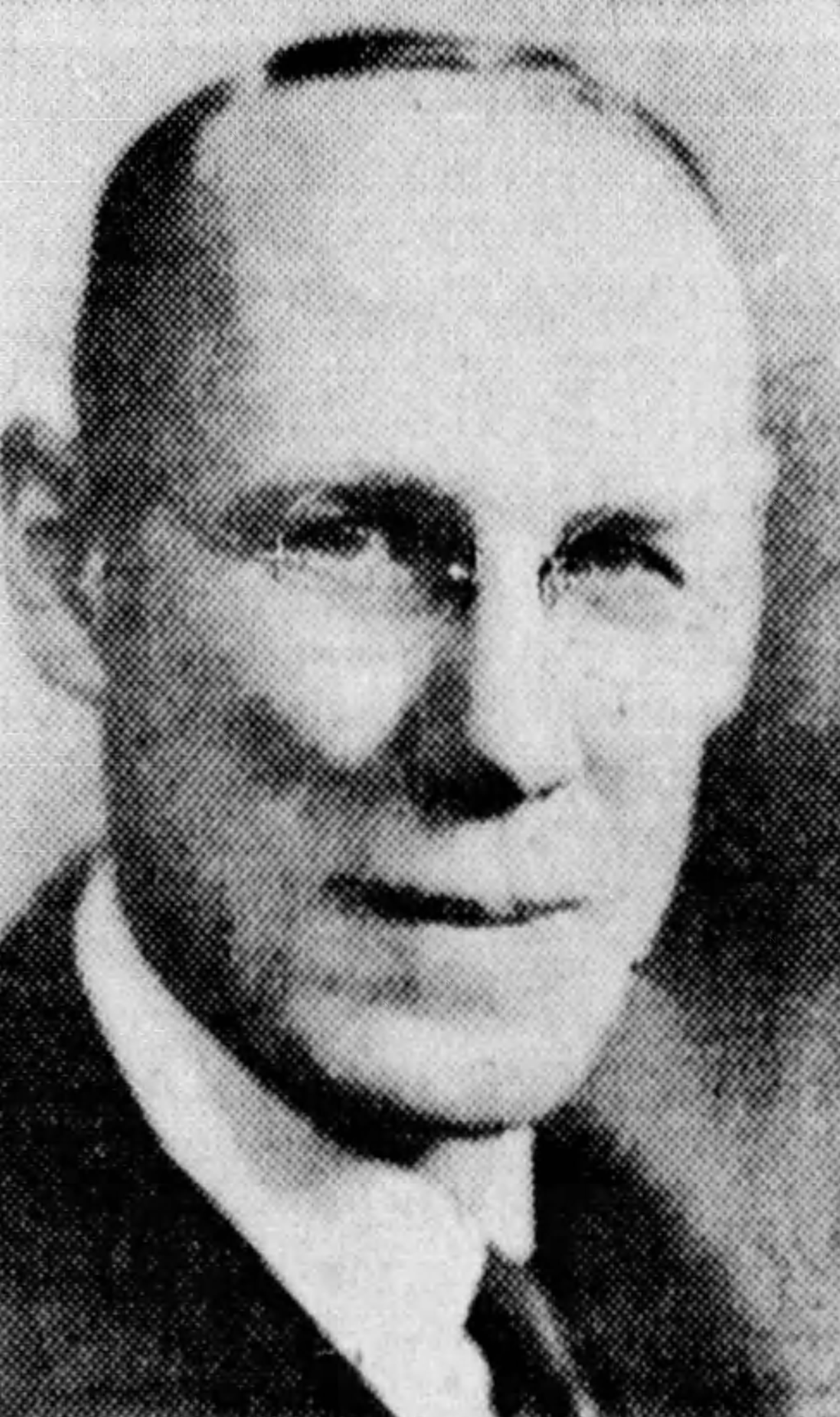
Roper c. 1942

On May 4, 1942 Conservative leader David Duggan died, and his Edmonton seat became vacant. Roper was nominated as the CCF's candidate in the ensuing by-election. The by-election was conducted using Alternative Voting and Roper, who was not the most-popular in the first round of counting, came out on top after vote transfers. CCF leader Chester Ronning, who had been elected in 1932, quickly stepped aside to hand the leadership to the party's sole MLA.

Roper was leader of the CCF for thirteen years, but he did not have to sit as its lone MLA that long: after the 1944 election, he was joined in the legislature by Aylmer Liesemer of Calgary. Two seats were the largest caucus the CCF had during Roper's tenure as its leader.

Both Liesemer and Roper were re-elected in the 1948 election. The party's share of the vote fell from 25% to 19%, but it was still due more than 10 MLAs. Roper did not add any new MLAs to his tiny caucus as Social Credit's stranglehold over the province remained intact. The CCF did elect a new MLA in the 1952 election - Willingdon's Nick Dushenski - but this gain was cancelled by Liesemer's defeat in the same election. Worse, the CCF's vote fell further, to 14%, and the Alberta Liberal Party doubled its seat count to four, making it the Official Opposition and leaving the CCF as the third party.

Things then got worse for the CCF. In the 1955 election, the CCF's share of the vote was only 8% and the previously dormant Conservatives passed it in the seat count. Moreover, Roper himself lost his seat in Edmonton (although two other CCF MLAs were elected - Dushenki in Whitford) and Stanley Ruzycki in Vegreville). Roper placed third of thirty candidates on the first ballot in the election held using Single transferable voting, but as Premier Ernest Manning's large number of surplus votes was redistributed to the city's other Social Credit candidates (and James Harper Prowse's only slightly smaller surplus was redistributed mostly to other Liberal candidates, Roper fell out of the top seven, where he needed to remain in order to be re-elected.

Following the election, Roper relinquished the CCF leadership. He never again sought provincial office. In part this was due to the Manning government switching to First Past the post from the combined STV/Alternative Voting system it had been using. Roper later said he thought that Manning had abolished the STV system in Edmonton to keep Roper from ever getting a seat again. Certainly it worked to the degree that no CCF or NDP again took an Edmonton seat until 1982 - and the change to First Past The Post was likely the main cause of that pattern.

== Municipal politics ==
Roper served as mayor of Edmonton, 1959-1963.

In advance of the 1959 municipal election, the city's mayoralty was up for grabs. William Hawrelak had resigned in scandal, and the man that the Edmonton City Council had chosen to replace him, Frederick John Mitchell, had decided to return to his aldermanic post rather than contest the mayoral election. Roper chose to contest it, and defeated three candidates (most notably his former legislature colleague James Prowse).

He was re-elected in the 1961 election, handily defeating alderman Ed Leger. He did not seek re-election at the conclusion of his second term. At the age of seventy, he was finished with politics.

== Later life, death, and legacy ==
Elmer Roper retired to Victoria, British Columbia in 1975, and died there November 12, 1994, aged 101. His wife had died in August, just after the couple's eightieth anniversary, and he was survived by two daughters and a son, former Edmonton alderman G Lyall Roper.

He had been made an honorary life member of the Rotary Club in 1928, and had received an honorary doctorate in laws from the University of Alberta in 1959. Additionally, Roper Road and Roper Industrial, an Edmonton road and neighbourhood respectively, are named in his honour.
