= Taber-Warner =

Provincial electoral district in Alberta, Canada

Coordinates: 49.44°N 111.79°W

Alberta electoral district
- Taber-Warner within Alberta (2017 boundaries).

Provincial electoral district
- Legislature: Legislative Assembly of Alberta
MLA
Grant Hunter
United Conservative
- District created: 1963
- District abolished: 1996
- District re-created: 2017
- First contested: 1963, 2019
- Last contested: 1993, 2023

Demographics
- Population (2016): 42,625
- Area (km²): 14,980
- Pop. density (per km²): 2.8

Taber-Warner is a provincial electoral district in Alberta, Canada. The district is mandated to return a single member to the Legislative Assembly of Alberta. The district has existed twice: the first iteration was represented in the Assembly from 1963 until 1997, and the district name was resurrected prior to the 2019 election.

== History ==
=== Boundary history ===
The district was created in 1963 from Taber and Warner, although not including the section of Taber to the north of the Old Man River. Its boundaries saw minor adjustments over the years, but always contained the communities of Taber, Warner, and Coaldale, stretching east from the City of Lethbridge and south to the Montana border.

The district became a flashpoint of controversy in 1994, when the Alberta Court of Appeal heavily criticized the new map of electoral boundaries drawn up by a committee of PC MLAs led by Bob Bogle. The Court noted that "one of the smallest divisions in the province...was that for which [Bogle] was then the sitting member". A new system for appointing boundaries commissions was introduced in 1995, and Taber-Warner was subsequently abolished. Most of its territory was transferred to Cardston-Taber-Warner in 1997, with the Coaldale area transferred to Little Bow.

The second iteration of the district took sections of Cardston-Taber-Warner, Little Bow and Cypress-Medicine Hat. It is significantly larger in area than the first, now stretching east to the border of Cypress County, but still entirely south of the Old Man and South Saskatchewan rivers.

=== Representation history ===
Members of the Legislative Assembly for Taber-Warner
Assembly	Years	Member	Party
See Taber and Warner 1913-1963
15th	1963–1967	Leonard Halmrast	Social Credit
16th	1967–1971	Douglas Miller	Social Credit
17th	1971–1975	Douglas Miller	Social Credit
18th	1975–1979	Robert Bogle	Progressive; Conservative
19th	1979–1982	Robert Bogle	Progressive; Conservative
20th	1982–1986	Robert Bogle	Progressive; Conservative
21st	1986–1989	Robert Bogle	Progressive; Conservative
22nd	1989–1993	Robert Bogle	Progressive; Conservative
23rd	1993–1997	Ron Hierath	Progressive; Conservative
See Cardston-Taber-Warner and Little Bow 1997-2019
30th	2019–2023	Grant Hunter	United Conservative
31st	2023–	Grant Hunter	United Conservative

Taber-Warner's first representative was the incumbent Warner MLA and Social Credit Minister for Public Welfare Leonard Halmrast, who had already served five terms in the Legislature. As no other candidates stood against him in the 1963 election, Taber-Warner holds the distinction of being the last district to elect an MLA by acclamation in Alberta. Halmrast retired at the end of that term.

Social Credit easily kept the seat in 1967, with Douglas Miller becoming MLA. In 1971, the party lost the general election to Peter Lougheed's Progressive Conservatives (PCs), but Miller was able to hang on to Taber-Warner by a small margin. He retired from politics in 1975.

The 1975 election in Taber-Warner was hotly contested, with second-time PC candidate Robert Bogle facing Social Credit leader and future Reform MP Werner Schmidt. Bogle defeated Schmidt by a wide margin, cementing the demise of Social Credit as a force in Alberta politics. He would go on to serve five terms as MLA, holding the position of Minister of Utilities and Telecommunications between 1982 and 1986, and briefly of PC caucus chair and Whip before his retirement from politics in 1993.

The district's last representative was Ron Hierath, who was elected comfortably in 1993 despite the Liberals' best showing in the otherwise conservative district. The riding was merged into Cardston-Taber-Warner in 1997, and Hierath would serve one more term as its first MLA.

== Election results ==
=== 2026 ===
2026 Independence Referendum
53.69%	46.31%
Remain	Referendum

=== 2023 ===
2023 Alberta general election
Party	Candidate	Votes	%	±%
United Conservative	Grant Hunter	12,379	75.29	-2.83
New Democratic	Jazminn Hintz	2,817	17.13	+4.24
Wildrose Loyalty Coalition	Paul Hinman	754	4.59	–
Green	Joel Hunt	239	1.45	–
Alberta Independence	Frank Kast	129	0.78	–
Solidarity Movement	Brent Ginther	124	0.75	–
Total		16,442	99.52	–
Rejected and declined		79	0.48	
Turnout		16,521	56.30	
Eligible voters		29,344		
United Conservative hold		Swing		-3.54
Source(s) Source: Elections Alberta

=== 2010s ===
2019 Alberta general election
Party	Candidate	Votes	%	±%
United Conservative	Grant R. Hunter	14,321	78.12%	1.22%
New Democratic	Laura Ross-Giroux	2,363	12.89%	-6.41%
Alberta Party	Jason Beekman	1,443	7.87%	–
Liberal	Amy Yates	205	1.12%	–
Total		18,332	–	–
Rejected, spoiled and declined		62	48	13
Eligible electors / turnout		28,269	65.11%	–
United Conservative pickup new district.				
Source(s) Source: "85 - Taber-Warner, 2019 Alberta general election". officialresults.elections.ab.ca. Elections Alberta. Alberta. Chief Electoral Officer (2019). 2019 General Election. A Report of the Chief Electoral Officer. Volume II (PDF) (Report). Vol. 2. Edmonton, Alta.: Elections Alberta. pp. 413–419. ISBN 978-1-988620-12-1.

Redistributed results, 2015 Alberta general election
Party	Votes	%
Wildrose	5,617	40.70
Progressive Conservative	4,998	36.20
New Democratic	2,669	19.30
Others	522	3.8

=== 1990s ===
1993 Alberta general election
Party	Candidate	Votes	%	±%
Progressive Conservative	Ron Hierath	5,544	59.84	-13.82
Liberal	Doug Blatter	2,723	29.39	+14.74
Social Credit	Ken Rose	564	6.09	
New Democratic	Charlie Bryant	433	4.67	-7.01
Total valid votes		9,264	100.00	
Rejected, spoiled and declined		20		
Eligible electors / Turnout		15,572	59.62	+10.49
Progressive Conservative hold		Swing		-14.28
Source(s) Alberta Heritage Foundation. "Election Results, Taber-Warner". Archived from the original on December 8, 2010.

=== 1980s ===
1989 Alberta general election
Party	Candidate	Votes	%	±%
Progressive Conservative	Robert Bogle	4,932	73.67	+6.57
Liberal	Patrick Flanagan	981	14.65	
New Democratic	Charlene Vickers	782	11.68	+0.36
Total valid votes		6,695	100.00	
Rejected, spoiled and declined		21		
Eligible electors / Turnout		13,670	49.13	-1.24
Progressive Conservative hold		Swing		-4.04
Source(s) Alberta Heritage Foundation. "Election Results, Taber-Warner". Archived from the original on December 8, 2010.

1986 Alberta general election
Party	Candidate	Votes	%	±%
Progressive Conservative	Robert Bogle	4,483	67.10	-4.04
Representative	John Voorhorst	1,442	21.58	
New Democratic	Jim Renfrow	756	11.32	+6.23
Total valid votes		6,681	100.00	
Rejected, spoiled and declined		35		
Eligible electors / Turnout		13,334	50.37	-22.08
Progressive Conservative hold		Swing		-12.81
Source(s) Alberta Heritage Foundation. "Election Results, Taber-Warner". Archived from the original on December 8, 2010.

1982 Alberta general election
Party	Candidate	Votes	%	±%
Progressive Conservative	Robert Bogle	6,800	71.14	+5.80
Western Canada Concept	Ronald Johnson	1,811	18.95	
New Democratic	Catherine R. McCreary	486	5.08	+2.29
Alberta Reform Movement	Emil D. Gundlock	461	4.82	
Total valid votes		9,558	100.00	
Rejected, spoiled and declined		24		
Eligible electors / Turnout		13,227	72.44	+9.91
Progressive Conservative hold		Swing		-6.57
Source(s) Alberta Heritage Foundation. "Election Results, Taber-Warner". Archived from the original on December 8, 2010.

=== 1970s ===
1979 Alberta general election
Party	Candidate	Votes	%	±%
Progressive Conservative	Robert Bogle	5,010	65.34	+1.56
Social Credit	Paul Primeau	2,108	27.49	-5.93
Liberal	Jessie Snow	335	4.37	
New Democratic	Larry Schowalter	214	2.79	0.00
Total valid votes		7,667	100.00	
Rejected, spoiled and declined		43		
Eligible electors / Turnout		12,330	62.53	-6.04
Progressive Conservative hold		Swing		+3.75
Source(s) Alberta Heritage Foundation. "Election Results, Taber-Warner". Archived from the original on December 8, 2010.

1975 Alberta general election
Party	Candidate	Votes	%	±%
Progressive Conservative	Robert Bogle	4,614	63.78	+18.55
Social Credit	Werner Schmidt	2,418	33.43	-21.34
New Democratic	Brian Aman	202	2.79	
Total valid votes		7,234	100.00	
Rejected, spoiled and declined		22		
Eligible electors / Turnout		10,582	68.57	-5.73
Progressive Conservative gain from Social Credit		Swing		+19.95
Source(s) Alberta Heritage Foundation. "Election Results, Taber-Warner". Archived from the original on December 8, 2010.

1971 Alberta general election
Party	Candidate	Votes	%	±%
Social Credit	Douglas Miller	4,077	54.77	-6.90
Progressive Conservative	Robert Bogle	3,367	45.23	+24.32
Total valid votes		7,444	100.00	
Rejected, spoiled and declined		39		
Eligible electors / Turnout		10,071	74.30	+14.37
Social Credit hold		Swing		-15.61
Source(s) Alberta Heritage Foundation. "Election Results, Taber-Warner". Archived from the original on December 8, 2010.

=== 1960s ===
1967 Alberta general election
Party	Candidate	Votes	%
Social Credit	Douglas Miller	3,451	61.67
Progressive Conservative	Emil D. Gundlock	1,170	20.91
Liberal	Theodore Rudd	683	12.21
New Democratic	Dick Verwoerd	292	5.22
Total valid votes		5,596	100.00
Rejected, spoiled and declined		39	
Eligible electors / Turnout		9,402	59.93
Social Credit hold			
Source(s) Alberta Heritage Foundation. "Election Results, Taber-Warner". Archived from the original on December 8, 2010.

1963 Alberta general election
Party	Candidate	Votes
Social Credit	Leonard Halmrast	Acclaimed
Total valid votes		0
Social Credit pickup new district.		
Source(s) Alberta Heritage Foundation. "Election Results, Taber-Warner". Archived from the original on December 8, 2010.

== See also ==
- List of Alberta provincial electoral districts
- Canadian provincial electoral districts
