= Solon Earl Low =

Canadian politician

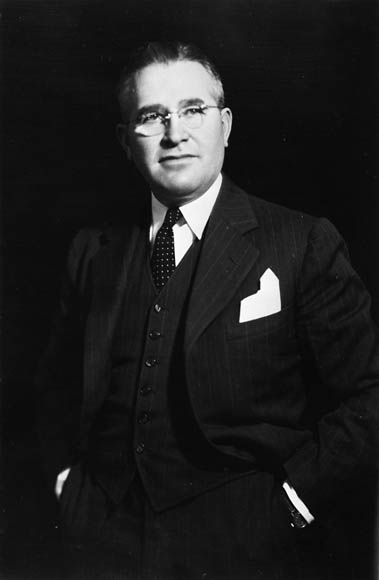
- Low in 1946

Leader of the Social Credit Association of Canada
- In office 6 April 1944 – 6 July 1961
- Preceded by: John Horne Blackmore (parliamentary leader)
- Succeeded by: Robert N. Thompson

Minister of Education of Alberta
- In office 1 June 1943 – 12 September 1944
- Premier: Ernest Manning
- Preceded by: William Aberhart
- Succeeded by: Ronald Ansley

Provincial Treasurer of Alberta
- In office 2 February 1937 – 12 September 1944
- Premier: William Aberhart; Ernest Manning
- Preceded by: Charles Cockroft
- Succeeded by: Ernest Manning

Member of Parliament for Peace River
- In office 11 June 1945 – 31 March 1958
- Preceded by: John Sissons
- Succeeded by: Ged Baldwin

Member of the Legislative Assembly of Alberta for Warner (Vegreville; 1940–1944)
- In office 22 August 1935 – 1 May 1945
- Preceded by: Maurice Conner
- Succeeded by: Leonard Halmrast

Personal details
- Born: 8 January 1900 Cardston, North West Territories, Canada
- Died: 22 December 1962 (aged 62) Shelby, Montana, U.S.
- Resting place: Cardston, Alberta, Canada
- Party: Social Credit
- Spouse(s): Unknown (1920–1922); Alice Fern Litchfield (1922–1958)
- Children: 8
- Occupation: Farmer; Teacher

Solon Earl Low (8 January 1900 – 22 December 1962) was a Canadian politician, farmer, teacher, and school principal in the 20th century.

== Early life ==
Low was born in Cardston, District of Alberta, Northwest Territories, on 8 January 1900, to Sarah Ida (Barber) and James Paton Low. His parents were American immigrants, and Mormon pioneer settlers. Low's father was a teacher, businessman, and participant in the Utah Constitutional Convention of 1895.

Low attended Cardston public schools and studied education at Calgary Normal College, the University of Alberta, and University of Southern California. At the University of Alberta, he took a lively interest in student activities including debate, basketball, and other sports. After his education he began teaching. He was married twice, the second time to Alice Fren Litchfield; together, they had five of his eight children.

== Political life ==
Low was elected to the Legislative Assembly of Alberta in the 1935 Alberta general election that swept the Social Credit Party of Alberta to power. Low became provincial treasurer under Premier William Aberhart in 1937. Low brokered an agreement during the 1937 Social Credit backbenchers' revolt to continue the government through a three-month budget and to try to bring Major C. H. Douglas to Alberta. As a Minister, Low introduced Accurate News and Information Act on 1 October 1937, and was passed by the legislature on 4 October 1937, during a marathon session which lasted until 12:30 the next morning. Lieutenant-Governor of Alberta John C. Bowen reserved royal assent until the Supreme Court of Canada evaluated the act's legality. In 1938's Reference re Alberta Statutes, the court found that it was unconstitutional, and it never became law. Low was defeated in 1940 but regained a seat in a by-election in which George Woytkiw resigned for him. Low also held the Minister of Education position in Premier Ernest Manning's government in 1943-1944.

In 1944, he was acclaimed the first national leader of the Social Credit Association of Canada at the party's founding convention. Though there had been a group of Social Credit MPs in parliament since 1935 under the leadership of John Horne Blackmore, the party did not have its first national convention until 1944, when the national party was formally founded. He was first elected to the House of Commons in the 1945 federal election. Low represented Peace River, Alberta until he lost his seat, along with every other Social Credit Member of Parliament (MP), in the 1958 federal election. Low retired as party leader in 1961 and became a judge of the juvenile and family court in Lethbridge in 1961. He would die later in 1962.

== Personal life ==
Low was a member of the Church of Jesus Christ of Latter-day Saints. His family moving to Edmonton in 1937 was a key event in the growth of the church in that city. His wife Alice was the first leader of the young women program in the Edmonton Branch.

Low contributed to Social Credit's reputation for anti-Semitism by numerous controversial comments. As Alberta treasurer, he once said:

"[A]nti-Semitism is spreading because people cannot fail to observe that a disproportionate number of Jews occupy positions of control in international finance, in revolutionary activities and in some propaganda institutions, the common policy of which is the centralization of power and the perversion of religious and cultural ideals."

Ending anti-Semitism, he said, would require Jews to denounce those "arch-criminals" in their midsts who are responsible for these initiatives.

In 1947, when Low was the federal leader of the Social Credit party, he used a national Canadian Broadcasting Corporation (CBC) broadcast to lambaste "the international power maniacs who aim to destroy Christianity" and the "international gangsters who are day-to-day scheming for world revolution." He also claimed there was a "close tie-up between international communism, international finance, and international political Zionism." Low repudiated anti-Semitism in 1957 after he had criticized Canada for not fully supporting Britain and France in the Suez Crisis and also visited Israel.

Legislative Assembly of Alberta
Preceded by Maurice Conner	MLA Warner; 1935–1940	Succeeded by James Walker
Preceded by George Woytkiw	MLA Vegreville; 1940–1944	Succeeded by Michael Ponich
Preceded by James Walker	MLA Warner; 1944–1945	Succeeded by Leonard Halmrast
Parliament of Canada
Preceded by John Sissons	Member of Parliament Peace River; 1945–1958	Succeeded by Ged Baldwin
