= 13th Alberta Legislature =

Canadian Legislative Assembly

- Majority parliament
- August 17, 1955 – May 9, 1959

Parliament leaders
- Premier: Ernest Charles Manning; May 31, 1943 – December 12, 1968
- Cabinet: Manning cabinet
- Leader of the Opposition: James Harper Prowse; February 21, 1952 – April 15, 1958
- Grant MacEwan; February 5, 1959 – April 17, 1959

Party caucuses
- Government: Social Credit Party
- Opposition: Alberta Liberal Party
- Crossbench: Progressive Conservative Association of Alberta
- Cooperative Commonwealth

Legislative Assembly
- Speaker of the Assembly: Peter Dawson; February 25, 1937 – March 24, 1963
- Members: 61 MLA seats

Sovereign
- Monarch: Elizabeth II; February 6, 1952 – September 8, 2022
- Lieutenant Governor: Hon. John James Bowlen; February 1, 1950 – December 16, 1959

Sessions
- 1st session August 17, 1955 – August 25, 1955
- 2nd session February 9, 1956 – March 29, 1956
- 3rd session February 14, 1957 – April 11, 1957
- 4th session February 28, 1958 – April 14, 1958
- 5th session February 5, 1959 – April 7, 1959
← 12th	→ 14th

The 13th Alberta Legislative Assembly was in session from August 17, 1955, to May 9, 1959, with the membership of the assembly determined by the results of the 1955 Alberta general election held on June 29, 1955. The Legislature officially resumed on August 17, 1955, and continued until the fifth session was prorogued on April 7, 1959, and dissolved on May 9, 1959, prior to the 1959 Alberta general election.

Alberta's thirteenth government was controlled by the majority Social Credit Party for the sixth time, led by Premier Ernest Manning who would go on to be the longest serving Premier in Alberta history. The Official Opposition was led by James Harper Prowse a member of the Alberta Liberal Party until the fifth session when Grant MacEwan became the leader of the Official Opposition. The Speaker was Peter Dawson who would serve until his death during the 15th legislature on March 24, 1963.

== Membership in the 13th Alberta Legislature ==
District	Member	Party	First elected/ previously elected	No.# of term(s)
Acadia-Coronation	James Sims	Liberal	1955	1st term
Alexandra	Anders Aalborg	Social Credit	1948	3rd term
Athabasca	Richard Hall	Liberal	1955	1st term
Banff-Cochrane	Frank Gainer	Coalition	1955	1st term
Bonnyville	Jake Josvanger	Liberal	1955	1st term
Bow Valley-Empress	Bryce Stringam	Independent	1955	1st term
Bruce	Earl Hardy	Social Credit	1948	3rd term
Calgary	Arthur Ryan Smith	Conservative	1955	1st term
Calgary	Hugh John MacDonald	Liberal	1948	3rd term
Calgary	Frederick C. Colborne	Social Credit	1945	4th term
Calgary	Rose Wilkinson	Social Credit	1944	4th term
Calgary	Grant MacEwan	Liberal	1955	1st term
Calgary	Arthur J. Dixon	Social Credit	1952	2nd term
Calgary	Ernest Watkins (1957)	Conservative	1957	1st term
Camrose	Chester Sayers	Social Credit	1941	5th term
Cardston	Edgar Hinman	Social Credit	1952	2nd term
Clover Bar	Floyd Baker	Social Credit	1935	6th term
Cypress	Harry Strom	Social Credit	1955	1st term
Didsbury	James Lawrence Owens	Social Credit	1955	1st term
Drumheller	Gordon Taylor	Social Credit	1940	5th term
Edmonton	Ernest Manning	Social Credit	1935	6th term
Edmonton	James Harper Prowse	Liberal	1945	4th term
Edmonton	Abe Miller	Liberal	1955	1st term
Edmonton	Harold Tanner	Liberal	1952	2nd term
Edmonton	Joseph Donovan Ross	Social Credit	1952	2nd term
Edmonton	John Page	Conservative	1940, 1952	4th term*
Edmonton	Edgar Gerhart	Social Credit	1952	2nd term
Edson	Norman Willmore	Social Credit	1944	4th term
Gleichen	George E. Bell	Social Credit	1944	4th term
Grande Prairie	Ira McLaughlin	Social Credit	1944	4th term
Grouard	Joseph Desfosses	Liberal	1951	3rd term
Hand Hills	Wallace Warren Cross	Social Credit	1935	6th term
Lac La Biche	Michael Maccagno	Liberal	1955	1st term
Lac Ste. Anne	John Mills	Liberal	1955	1st term
Lacombe	Allen Patrick	Social Credit	1952	2nd term
Leduc	Ronald Ansley	Independent Social Credit	1935	6th term
Lethbridge	John Landeryou	Social Credit	1944	4th term
Little Bow	Peter Dawson	Social Credit	1935	6th term
Macleod	James Hartley	Social Credit	1935	6th term
Medicine Hat	Elizabeth Robinson	Social Credit	1953	2nd term
Okotoks-High River	Ross Ellis	Liberal and Conservative Coalition	1955	1st term
Olds	Frederick Niddrie	Social Credit	1950	3rd term
Olds	Roderick Macleod (1959)	Social Credit	1959	1st term
Peace River	William Gilliland	Social Credit	1944	4th term
Pembina	Robin Jorgenson	Social Credit	1944	4th term
Pincher Creek-Crowsnest	William Kovach	Social Credit	1948	3rd term
Ponoka	Glen Johnston	Social Credit	1952	2nd term
Red Deer	Cam Kirby	Conservative	1954	2nd term
Redwater	Alfred Macyk	Liberal	1955	1st term
Rocky Mountain House	Alfred Hooke	Social Credit	1935	6th term
Sedgewick	Jack Hillman	Social Credit	1952	2nd term
Spirit River	Adolph Fimrite	Social Credit	1952	2nd term
St. Albert	Arthur Soetaert	Liberal	1955	1st term
St. Paul	Raymond Reierson	Social Credit	1952	2nd term
Stettler	John Clark	Social Credit	1952	2nd term
Stettler	Galen Norris (1956)	Social Credit	1956	1st term
Stony Plain	John McLaughlin	Liberal	1955	1st term
Taber	Roy Lee	Social Credit	1940	5th term
Vegreville	Stanley Ruzycki	Cooperative Commonwealth	1955	1st term
Vermilion	Russell Whitson	Liberal	1955	1st term
Wainwright	Henry Ruste	Social Credit	1955	1st term
Warner	Leonard Halmrast	Social Credit	1945	4th term
Wetaskiwin	John Wingblade	Social Credit	1935	6th term
Willingdon	Nick Dushenski	Cooperative Commonwealth	1952	2nd term

== Standings changes since the 13th general election ==
Affiliation	Members
Social Credit	37
Liberal	15
Progressive Conservative	3
Co-operative Commonwealth	2
Liberal + Progressive Conservative^{1}	1
Coalition	1
Independent Social Credit	1
Total	61

1. The candidate in Okotoks-High River was jointly nominated by the Progressive Conservative and Liberal parties.

Membership changes in the 13th Assembly
Date	Name	District	Party	Reason
June 29, 1955	See List of Members			Election day of the 13th Alberta general election
June 3, 1956	John Clark	Stettler	Social Credit	Committed suicide after murdering seven people
November 15, 1956	Galen Norris	Stettler	Social Credit	Elected in a by-election
1957	Arthur Smith	Calgary	Progressive Conservative	Vacated his seat to run in the 1957 federal election.
October 2, 1957	Ernest Watkins	Calgary	Progressive Conservative	Elected in a by-election
December 19, 1958	Frederick Niddrie	Olds	Social Credit	Died
February 9, 1959	Roderick Macleod	Olds	Social Credit	Elected in a by-election
