= Galen Norris =

Canadian politician

Galen Clark Norris MLA

Legislative Assembly of Alberta
- In office November 15, 1956 – August 20, 1971
- Preceded by: John Clark
- Succeeded by: Jack Robertson
- Constituency: Stettler

Personal details
- Born: November 7, 1915
- Died: August 10, 2001 (aged 85)
- Party: Social Credit

Galen Clark Norris (November 7, 1915 – August 10, 2001) was a provincial level politician from Alberta, Canada. He served as a member of the Legislative Assembly of Alberta from 1959 to 1971.

== Early life ==
Galen Clark Norris was born on November 7, 1915. He resided in the small town of Erskine, Alberta just west of Stettler.

November 16, 1956 by-election results		Turnout Unknown	
Affiliation	Candidate	Votes	%
Social Credit	Galen Norris	2,744	61.79%
Liberal	Murray Rairdan	1,677	38.21%
Total		4,421	100%
Rejected, Spoiled and Declined		Unknown	

== Political career ==
=== First term ===
Norris was first elected to serve in the Alberta Legislature in a by-election held in the Stettler provincial electoral district on November 16, 1956. The by-election was caused by the death of former Social Credit MLA John E. Clark. Norris ran against a single opponent, Murray Rairdan representing the provincial Liberals. On election night Norris won a healthy majority of 61.79 percent of the popular vote cast. He easily held the district for the governing Social Credit party.

Norris took his seat for the first time to sit with the Social Credit caucus on February 15, 1957 during the third session of the 13th Legislative Assembly. He was appointed to sit on a total of five standing committee's in his first term in office. Norris was appointed as the Chairman for the Standing Committee for Law Amendments. He also served as a regular member of the Standing Committee for Municipal Law; Public Accounts; Privileges and Elections; and Railways, Telephones and Irrigation. Norris did not move and bills or motions in the third session, but he did second the motion to move the speech from the throne.

Norris participated in recorded votes during his first term in office. He recorded his first vote on February 19, 1957 voting to defeat a Liberal motion introduced by Lac La Biche MLA Michael Maccagno, calling for the Social Credit government to study ways to give Alberta adequate Air Ambulance service in the province. A week later Norris voted in favor of an almost unanimous motion introduced by Olds MLA Frederick Niddrie to call on the Parliament of Canada to repeal section 12 of the Indian Act. A few days later Norris would vote against to defeat a motion introduced by Liberal MLA from Vermilion Russell Whitson to have the government cover the cost for farmers of halving calves vaccinated against Brucellosis.

The most contentious vote of Norris' first term in the Assembly came on March 12, 1957 in order to adopt a motion to create the 1957 Alberta liquor plebiscite. The vote was hotly contested with a number of Social Credit MLAs breaking the party line to vote in favor of it. Norris voted against holding the plebiscite, but the vote was won 28 to 27. Norris voted on the only bill during the session to have a recorded vote. Bill 95 introduced by Cardston MLA Edgar Hinman. The bill gave royalty payments to Alberta citizens from oil and gas revenues and was strongly opposed by the opposition parties. Norris voted in favor of this bill. He also voted against a motion to record Assembly proceedings by Hansard and voted to keep a prohibition on farmers using tax free purple gas to drive farm vehicles on roadways.

At the beginning of the 4th session, Norris was appointed to serve on a special committee to appoint members to regular committee's.

=== Second term ===
1959 Alberta general election results		Turnout Unknown	
Affiliation	Candidate	Votes	%
Social Credit	Galen Norris	3,150	61.06%
Progressive Conservative	Gordon Taylor	991	19.21%
Liberal	Henry Kroeger	721	13.98%
Cooperative Commonwealth	Alice Ness	297	5.75%
Total		5,159	100%
Rejected, Spoiled and Declined		Unknown	

Norris ran for a second term in office in the 1959 general election. He won his second term with a large majority this time against four other candidates. He defeated second place Gordon Taylor of the Progressive Conservatives. The Liberals which finished second in the by-election, dropped to third place under future MLA Henry Kroeger. Norris would see his popular vote increase with the higher voter turnout, but his overall percentage was almost unchanged.

Norris was re-appointed to all his previous committee postings in the 14th Legislative Assembly.

=== Third term ===
He won election to a third term in office in the 1963 Alberta general election.

=== Fourth term ===
On October 24, 1967, Norris was appointed as a Commissioner of Oaths for the Province of Alberta. Norris was defeated by Jack Robertson, while attempting to run for a fifth term in office. He made another attempt to win re-election by running in a by-election held on February 14, 1972. He was defeated by Graham Harle.

Norris died on August 10, 2001.

Table of Contents			Committee Summary Time Line																
Committee Chairman	Regular member	Committee not created	Committee Summary Time Line																
Committee Name			13th Assembly			14th Assembly					15th Assembly					16th Assembly			
Committee Name			3rd	4th	5th	1st	2nd	3rd	4th	5th	1st	2nd	3rd	4th	5th	1st	2nd	3rd	4th
Standing Committee on Agriculture, Colonization, Immigration and Education																			
Standing Committee on Public Affairs, Agriculture and Education																			
Standing Committee on Law Amendments																			
Standing Committee on Municipal Law																			
Standing Committee on Municipal Law and Law Amendments																			
Standing Committee on Law, Law Amendments and Regulation																			
Standing Committee on Public Accounts																			
Standing Committee on Privileges and Elections																			
Standing Committee on Railways, Telephones and Irrigation																			
Special Committee to Appoint Members to Compose Select Standing Committees of the Assembly																			
