= Sifton ministry =

Cabinet of Alberta, 1910–1917

Sifton Ministry
- 2nd ministry of Alberta

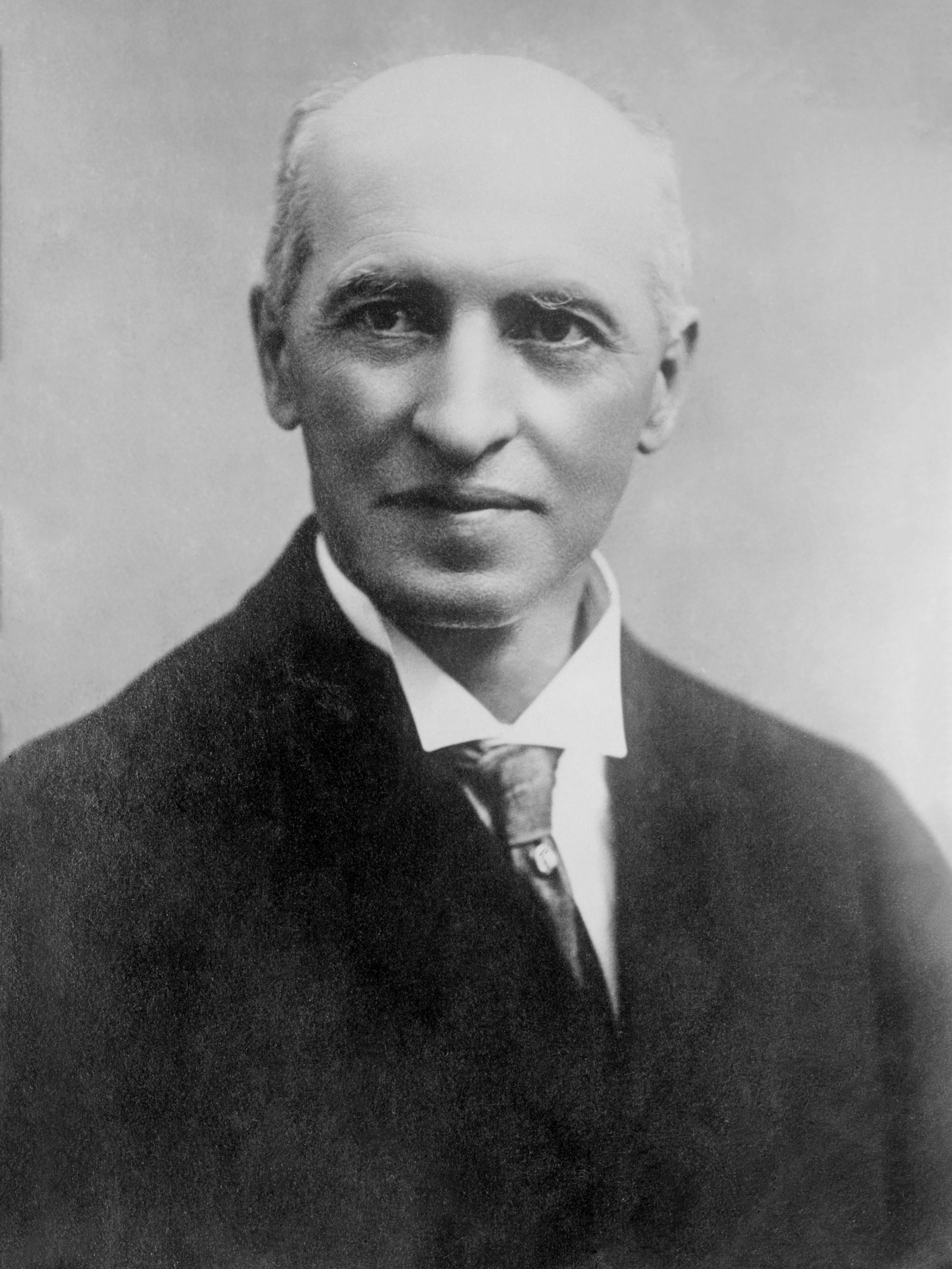
- Arthur Sifton
- Date formed: May 26, 1910
- Date dissolved: October 30, 1917

People and organisations
- Monarch: George V
- Lieutenant Governor: George H. V. Bulyea; Robert Brett
- Premier: Arthur Sifton
- Member party: Alberta Liberal Party
- Status in legislature: Majority

History
- Elections: 1913; 1917
- Legislature terms: 2nd Alberta Legislature; 3rd Alberta Legislature
- Predecessor: Rutherford Ministry
- Successor: Stewart Ministry

The Sifton Ministry was the combined Cabinet (called Executive Council of Alberta), chaired by Premier Arthur Sifton, and Ministers that governed Alberta party way through the 2nd Alberta Legislature beginning on May 26, 1910, through the 3rd Alberta Legislature to October 30, 1917.

The Executive Council (commonly known as the cabinet) was made up of members of the Alberta Liberal Party which held a majority of seats in the Legislative Assembly of Alberta. The cabinet was appointed by the Lieutenant Governor of Alberta on the advice of the Premier.

== Background ==
=== Rutherford ministry and resignation ===
In 1910, the Liberal government of Alexander Cameron Rutherford was embroiled in the Alberta and Great Waterways (A&GW) Railway scandal. Accusations of favouritism by the government towards the Alberta and Great Waterways Railway had split the Liberal Party, and Rutherford's ability to remain at its head was in doubt. Lieutenant-Governor George Bulyea, a Liberal who had reluctantly asked Rutherford to form a government in 1905, saw his doubts about the Premier's leadership skills validated and quietly began looking for candidates to replace him and save the Liberal Party. Several possibilities—including William Henry Cushing, Peter Talbot, and Frank Oliver—were considered and either rejected or found to be uninterested in the job. As early as March 14, Bulyea had concluded that Sifton might be "the only permanent solution", though it was not until May that the Lieutenant-Governor was able to secure Rutherford's agreement to resign and the agreement of both major factions in the Liberal caucus to accept Sifton as Premier. Even up until the last minute, Members of the Legislative Assembly (MLAs) loyal to Charles Wilson Cross—the province's Attorney-General and a staunch Rutherford ally—threatened to scuttle the arrangement unless Cross was kept on as attorney-general, to which Sifton refused to agree. On May 26, Rutherford resigned and Arthur Sifton became the second Premier of Alberta.

=== Cabinet selection ===
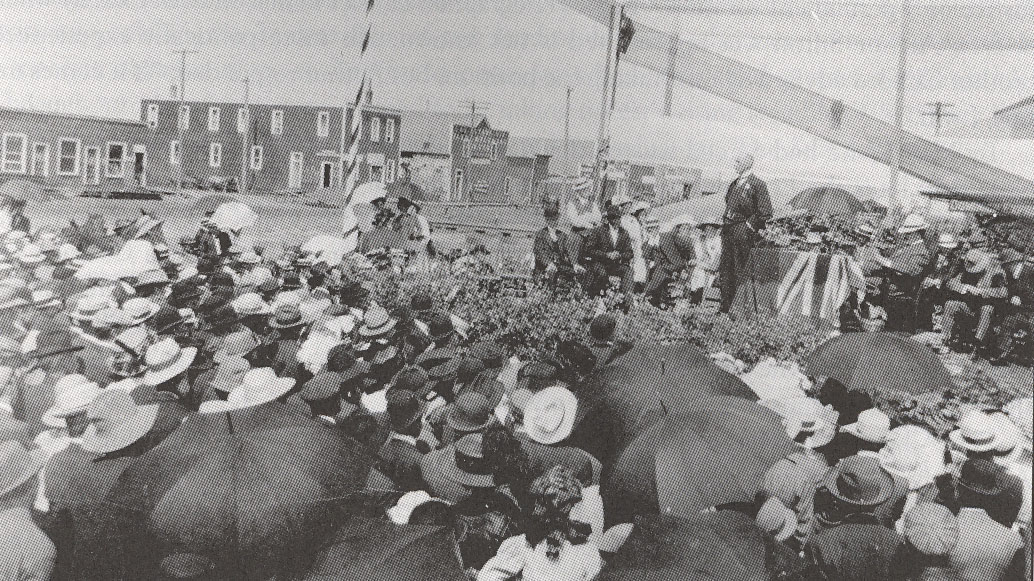
Sifton addressing a political meeting in Wetaskiwin, August 1910

One of his first challenges was to craft a cabinet satisfactory to all factions; this he did by excluding the leaders of all sides. He himself took the portfolios of Public Works and Provincial Treasurer. Charles R. Mitchell, who like Sifton had been a judge during the scandal and had accordingly played no part in it, became Minister of Education and Attorney-General. Archibald J. McLean was named Provincial Secretary. His support for the insurgents (though not as one of their leaders) was offset by the continuation of Rutherford's Agriculture Minister Duncan Marshall, who had played no particular role during the scandal but had remained loyal to Rutherford. To the consternation of the opposition Conservatives, Bulyea prorogued the legislation before this new government's strength could be tested by a vote of confidence. Still, its acceptance by the Liberal caucus can be measured by the fact that only one member, Ezra Riley, resigned in protest. Riley objected to the exclusion from cabinet of insurgency leader W. H. Cushing; after his resignation he ran as an independent Liberal in the ensuing by-election, but was defeated by Sifton supporter Archibald J. McArthur.

As time began to heal old wounds, Sifton expanded his cabinet to include several of the old adversaries: in February 1912 Cross was re-instated as Attorney-General and rebel leader John R. Boyle was made Minister of Education (Mitchell, who had previously held both of these posts, was transferred to the Public Works portfolio). The other new additions to cabinet—Malcolm McKenzie as Provincial Treasurer and Charles Stewart in the new position of Minister of Municipal Affairs—had voted with the Rutherford government during the scandal.

Another early challenge for the new Premier was to win a seat in the Legislative Assembly of Alberta. Although he lived and worked in Calgary, his first cabinet was composed mostly of southern members (McLean represented Lethbridge District, Marshall represented Olds, and Mitchell was soon elected in Medicine Hat), so Sifton had Archibald Campbell resign his Vermilion seat and sought election there. Despite accusations by the Conservatives that the Liberals bought "the foreign vote" with beer, whiskey, and tobacco, he won a comfortable majority.

== List of ministers ==
Name		Date Appointed	Date Departed
Arthur Sifton	President of the Executive Council (Premier)	May 26, 1910	October 12, 1917
Arthur Sifton	Provincial Treasurer	June 1, 1910	May 3, 1912
Malcolm McKenzie	Provincial Treasurer	May 4, 1912	March 15, 1913
Arthur Sifton	Provincial Treasurer	March 27, 1913	November 27, 1913
Charles Richmond Mitchell	Provincial Treasurer	November 28, 1913	August 12, 1921
Archibald J. McLean	Provincial Secretary	June 1, 1910	October 15, 1917
Charles Richmond Mitchell	Attorney General	June 1, 1910	May 4, 1912
Charles Wilson Cross	Attorney General	May 4, 1912	August 23, 1918
Duncan Marshall	Minister of Agriculture	November 1, 1909	August 12, 1921
Charles Richmond Mitchell	Minister of Education	June 1, 1910	May 4, 1912
John Robert Boyle	Minister of Education	May 4, 1912	August 25, 1918
Archibald J. McLean	Minister of Municipal Affairs	December 20, 1911	May 3, 1912
Charles Stewart	Minister of Municipal Affairs	May 4, 1912	November 27, 1913
Wilfrid Gariépy	Minister of Municipal Affairs	November 28, 1913	August 25, 1918
Arthur Sifton	Minister of Public Works	June 1, 1910	May 3, 1912
Charles Richmond Mitchell	Minister of Public Works	May 4, 1912	December 1, 1913
Charles Stewart	Minister of Public Works	December 2, 1913	October 15, 1917
Arthur Sifton	Minister of Railways and Telephones	December 20, 1911	October 15, 1917

== See also ==
- Executive Council of Alberta
- List of Alberta provincial ministers
