= Stewart ministry =

Cabinet of Alberta, 1917–1921

Stewart Ministry
- 3rd ministry of Alberta

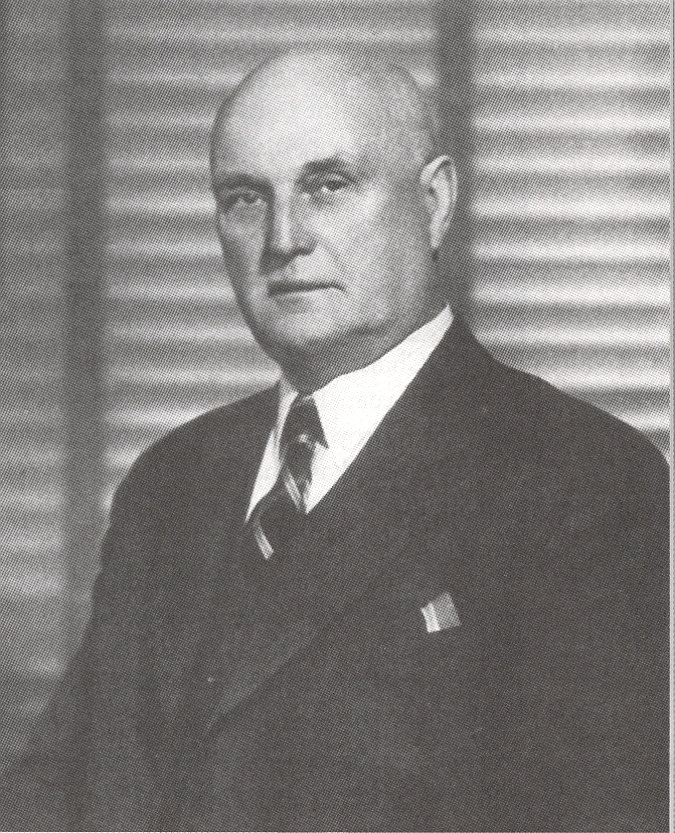
- Charles Stewart
- Date formed: October 30, 1917
- Date dissolved: August 13, 1921

People and organisations
- Monarch: George V
- Lieutenant Governor: Robert Brett
- Premier: Charles Stewart
- Member party: Alberta Liberal Party
- Status in legislature: Majority

History
- Legislature term: 4th Alberta Legislature
- Predecessor: Sifton Ministry
- Successor: Greenfield Ministry

The Stewart Ministry was the combined Cabinet (called Executive Council of Alberta), chaired by Premier Charles Stewart, and Ministers that governed Alberta during the 4th Alberta Legislature from October 30, 1917, to August 13, 1921.

The Executive Council (commonly known as the cabinet) was made up of members of the Alberta Liberal Party which held a majority of seats in the Legislative Assembly of Alberta. The cabinet was appointed by the Lieutenant Governor of Alberta on the advice of the Premier.

== List of ministers ==
Name		Date Appointed	Date Departed
Charles Stewart	President of the Executive Council (Premier)	October 13, 1917	August 12, 1921
Charles Richmond Mitchell	Provincial Treasurer	November 28, 1913	August 12, 1921
George P. Smith	Provincial Secretary	October 16, 1917	August 25, 1918
Wilfrid Gariépy	Provincial Secretary	August 26, 1918	September 24, 1918
Jean Côté	Provincial Secretary	September 25, 1918	August 12, 1921
Charles Wilson Cross	Attorney General	May 4, 1912	August 23, 1918
John Robert Boyle	Attorney General	August 24, 1918	August 12, 1921
Duncan Marshall	Minister of Agriculture	November 1, 1909	August 12, 1921
John Robert Boyle	Minister of Education	May 4, 1912	August 25, 1918
George P. Smith	Minister of Education	August 26, 1918	August 12, 1921
Wilfrid Gariépy	Minister of Municipal Affairs	November 28, 1913	August 25, 1918
Alexander Grant MacKay	Minister of Municipal Affairs	August 26, 1918	April 25, 1920
Charles Richmond Mitchell	Minister of Municipal Affairs	April 29, 1920	August 12, 1921
Alexander Grant MacKay	Minister of Public Health	July 22, 1919	April 25, 1920
Charles Richmond Mitchell	Minister of Public Health	April 29, 1920	August 12, 1921
Archibald J. McLean	Minister of Public Works	October 16, 1917	August 12, 1921
Charles Stewart	Minister of Railways and Telephones	October 16, 1917	August 12, 1921

== See also ==
- Executive Council of Alberta
- List of Alberta provincial ministers
