= James Hansen (politician) =

Canadian politician

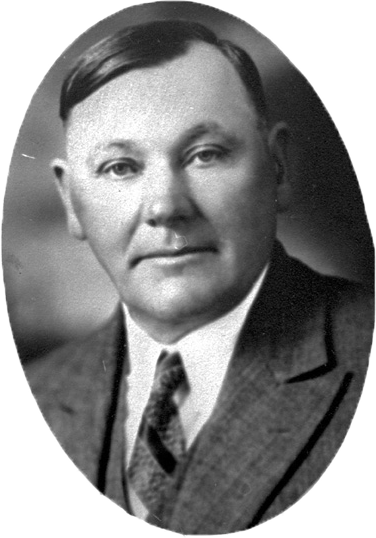

Member of the Legislative Assembly of Alberta
- In office 1935–1940
- Preceded by: John MacLellan
- Succeeded by: Roy S. Lee
- Constituency: Taber

Personal details
- Born: February 17, 1884 Højslev, Denmark
- Died: May 14, 1951 (aged 67) Taber, Alberta, Canada
- Party: Social Credit
- Children: Nine

James Hansen (February 17, 1884 – May 14, 1951) was a provincial politician from Alberta, Canada. He served as a member of the Legislative Assembly of Alberta from 1935 to 1940, sitting with the Social Credit caucus in government. He died of heart disease in 1951.
