= Frank Grisdale =

Canadian politician

Frank Sydney Grisdale BSc. CBE

Member of the Legislative Assembly of Alberta for Olds
- In office 1930–1935
- Preceded by: Nelson Smith
- Succeeded by: Herbert Ash

Personal details
- Born: July 8, 1887 Hudson, Quebec
- Died: December 29, 1976 (aged 89)
- Spouse: Amy Kline
- Children: Elizabeth, Margueritte, Lloyd Carl (1919), J.Hiram(1923),
- Education: BSc. Macdonald College, McGill University, 1911
- Occupation: Agriculture, Education

Frank Sydney Grisdale, BSc., CBE (July 8, 1887 – December 29, 1976) was a politician from Olds, Alberta, Canada. He served in the Legislative Assembly of Alberta from 1930 to 1935. He sat with the United Farmers caucus and served from 1934 to 1935 as a cabinet minister in the government of Premier Richard Gavin Reid. He was the first principal of the Olds Agricultural College, now Olds College. Frank Grisdale Hall at Olds College is named for him.

== Political career ==
Grisdale first ran for a seat in the Alberta Legislature in the 1930 general election, as the United Farmers candidate in the electoral district of Olds. He defeated Liberal candidate George Clark by a couple of hundred votes.

Grisdale was appointed Minister of Agriculture on June 2, 1934.

He ran for re-election in the 1935 general election and was defeated in a landslide by Social Credit candidate Herbert Ash.

Grisdale attempted to return to the Alberta Legislature as an independent candidate in the 1940 general election. He led the first vote count by 110 votes over the Social Credit candidate Norman Cook. Incumbent Herbert Ash, who was running as an independent, finished a distant third and was eliminated. Grisdale lost on the second count, as most of Ash's second preferences went to Cook, putting him ahead of Grisdale by less than 100 votes.
