= Graham Harle =

Canadian politician (1931–2022)

The Honourable Graham Harle ECA

Member of the Legislative Assembly of Alberta
- In office February 14, 1972 – May 7, 1986
- Preceded by: Jack Robertson
- Succeeded by: Brian Downey
- Constituency: Stettler

Minister of Consumer and Corporate Affairs
- In office April 3, 1975 – March 22, 1979
- Preceded by: Robert Dowling
- Succeeded by: Julian Koziak

Solicitor General
- In office March 23, 1979 – November 15, 1983
- Preceded by: Roy Farran
- Succeeded by: Ian Reid

Personal details
- Born: Graham Lisle Harle; December 9, 1931 Newcastle upon Tyne, Northumberland, England
- Died: February 9, 2022 (aged 90) Edmonton, Alberta, Canada
- Party: Progressive Conservative
- Education: University of Alberta
- Occupation: Lawyer

Graham Lisle Harle ECA (December 9, 1931 – February 9, 2022) was a British-born Canadian provincial level politician from Alberta. He served as a member of the Legislative Assembly of Alberta from February 14, 1972, to 1986 sitting with the governing Progressive Conservative caucus. During his time in the legislature Harle served in a couple of different portfolios in the cabinet of Premier Peter Lougheed.

== Early life ==
Harle was born on December 9, 1931, in Newcastle upon Tyne, Northumberland, England, to James Alfred Harle and wife Constance Balfour. Harle attended Denstone College before moving to Edmonton in 1947 at the age of 16 with his parents. He finished high school in Edmonton and attended the University of Alberta where he completed an agriculture degree and later law. Harle contracted polio in 1952 and was hospitalized for five months.

== Political career ==
Harle received a letter from Peter Lougheed in 1965 letting him know of his candidacy for leader of the Progressive Conservative Association. Harle worked as an organizer for the party, assisting with the organization of a candidate for the 1967 Alberta general election.

Harle ran for a seat to the Alberta Legislature for the first time in a by-election held on February 14, 1972, in the electoral district of Stettler. He defeated former Social Credit MLA Galen Norris in a hotly contested race to hold the seat for the governing Progressive Conservatives.

Harle ran for his second term in the 1975 Alberta general election. He won re-election easily defeating two other candidates. After winning his second term in office Harle was appointed to a position in the Executive Council of Alberta by Premier Peter Lougheed as Minister of Consumer and Corporate Affairs.

Harle ran for a third term in office in the 1979 general election. He won a larger share of the popular vote in his district and cruised to an easy victory. Harle was shuffled to the Soliticiter general portfolio by Lougheed immediately following the election. Harle ran for a fourth term in office in the 1982 general election. He won the best popular vote of his career.

On November 15, 1983 Harle resigned his cabinet post after he was caught by police in a Government of Alberta vehicle with a prostitute. Harle claimed that he was conducting a personal investigation of prostitution control and was seeking "firsthand information", but admitted he had not disclosed his plan with any police or government officials. Harle also claimed he invited the woman into the car he thought she was looking for a ride. He kept his seat sitting in the back benches and did not seek another term after the legislature dissolved in 1986.

== Personal life ==
Harle died in Edmonton on February 9, 2022, at the age of 90.
