= John MacLellan =

Canadian politician

Member of the Legislative Assembly of Alberta
- In office June 19, 1930 – August 22, 1935
- Preceded by: Lawrence Peterson
- Succeeded by: James Hansen
- Constituency: Taber

Minister of Public Works
- In office July 14, 1934 – September 3, 1935
- Premier: Richard Reid
- Preceded by: Richard Reid
- Succeeded by: William Fallow

Personal details
- Born: July 26, 1878 Westville, Nova Scotia
- Died: September 17, 1955 (aged 77)
- Party: United Farmers
- Occupation: politician

John James MacLellan (July 26, 1878 – September 17, 1955) was a provincial politician from Alberta, Canada. He served as a member of the Legislative Assembly of Alberta from 1930 to 1935 sitting with the United Farmers caucus in government. During his time in office he briefly served as a cabinet minister in the government of Premier Richard Reid from 1934 to 1935.

== Political career ==
MacLellan ran for a seat to the Alberta Legislature in the 1930 Alberta general election as a United Farmers candidate in the electoral district of Taber. He won a closely contested two-way race over an independent candidate to hold the district for his party.

MacLellan was promoted to the Executive Council of Alberta by Premier Richard Reid on July 14, 1934, to run the Public Works portfolio. He ran for re-election in the 1935 Alberta general election but was defeated finishing a distant second place out of three candidates losing to Social Credit candidate James Hansen.
