= Edward Prudden =

Canadian politician

Edward Hulburd Prudden

Member of the Legislative Assembly of Alberta
- In office June 7, 1917 – July 18, 1921
- Preceded by: Robert Shaw
- Succeeded by: Albert Sanders
- Constituency: Stettler

Personal details
- Born: September 28, 1859
- Died: July 14, 1932 (aged 72)
- Party: Liberal
- Occupation: politician

Edward Hulburd Prudden (1859-1932) was a provincial politician from Alberta, Canada. He served as a member of the Legislative Assembly of Alberta from 1917 to 1921 sitting with the Liberal caucus in government.

== Political career ==
Prudden ran for a seat to the Alberta Legislature in the 1917 Alberta general election as a candidate for the provincial Liberals. He won a close race over Conservative candidate George McMorris by 33 votes to hold the seat for his party.

Prudden ran for a second term in the 1921 Alberta general election. He was defeated in a landslide in the two-way race by United Farmers candidate Albert Sanders.
