= Nelson S. Smith =

Canadian politician

Nelson Stuart Smith
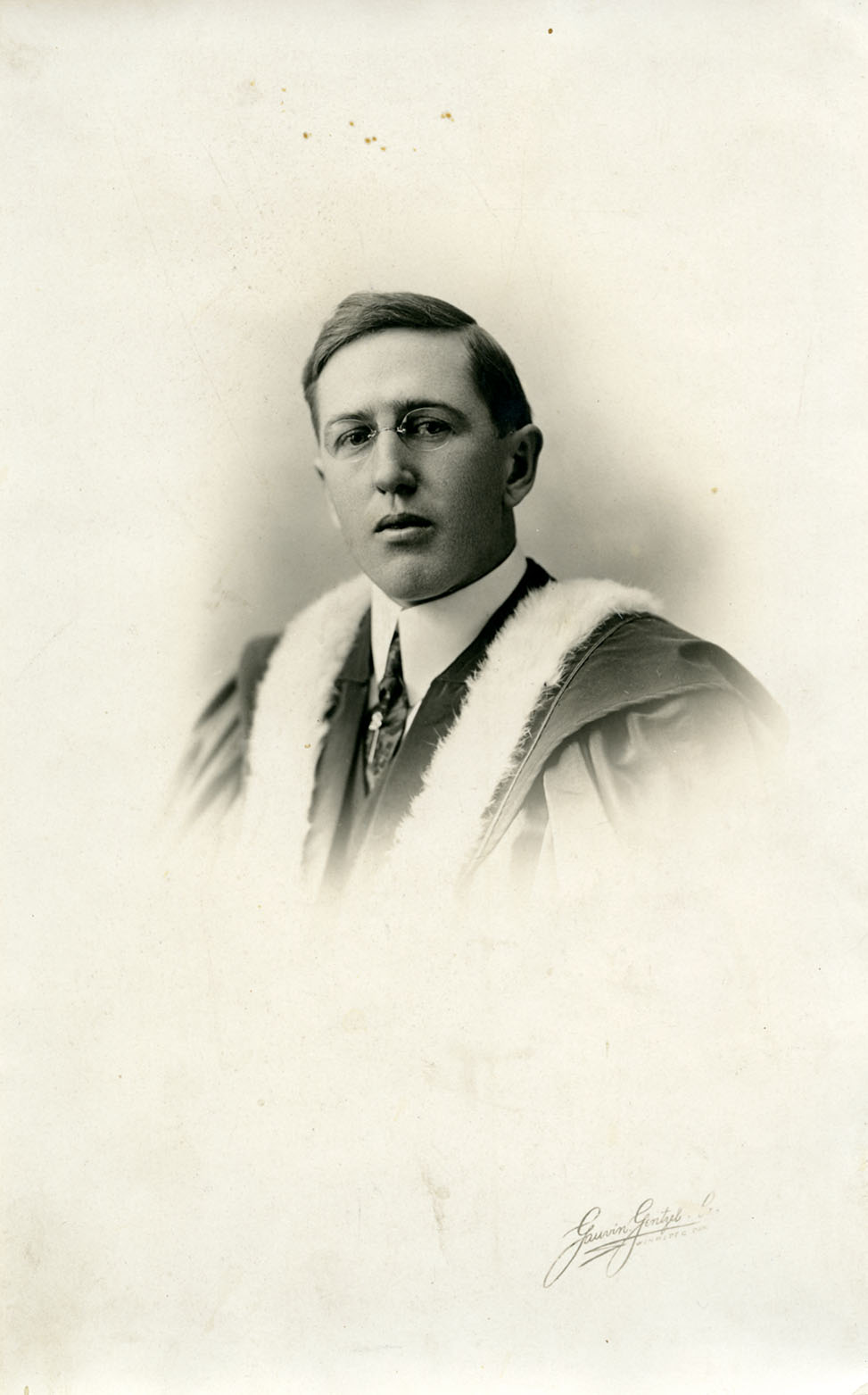

Member of the Legislative Assembly of Alberta for Olds
- In office 1921–1930
- Preceded by: Duncan Marshall
- Succeeded by: Frank Grisdale

Personal details
- Born: April 19, 1888 Minto, Manitoba
- Died: March 15, 1941 (aged 52) Claresholm, Alberta

Nelson Stuart Smith (1888-1941) was a provincial level politician from Alberta, Canada. He served as a member of the Legislative Assembly of Alberta representing the Olds electoral district from 1921 to 1930. He sat with the United Farmers of Alberta caucus.

== Political career ==
Smith ran for a seat in the Alberta Legislature in the 1921 Alberta general election. He defeated incumbent Liberal Agriculture Minister Duncan Marshall to win his first term in the Legislature. He won the district taking 60% of the popular vote. He sat in the backbenches for the governing United Farmers caucus.

Smith ran for re-election in the 1926 Alberta general election. He defeated Liberal candidate Norman Cook and Conservative L.H. Walkley in a three-way race, largely holding his percentage of vote from the previous election.

Smith retired from the Legislature in 1930.
