= Rutherford ministry =

Cabinet of Alberta, 1905–1910

Rutherford Ministry
- 1st ministry of Alberta

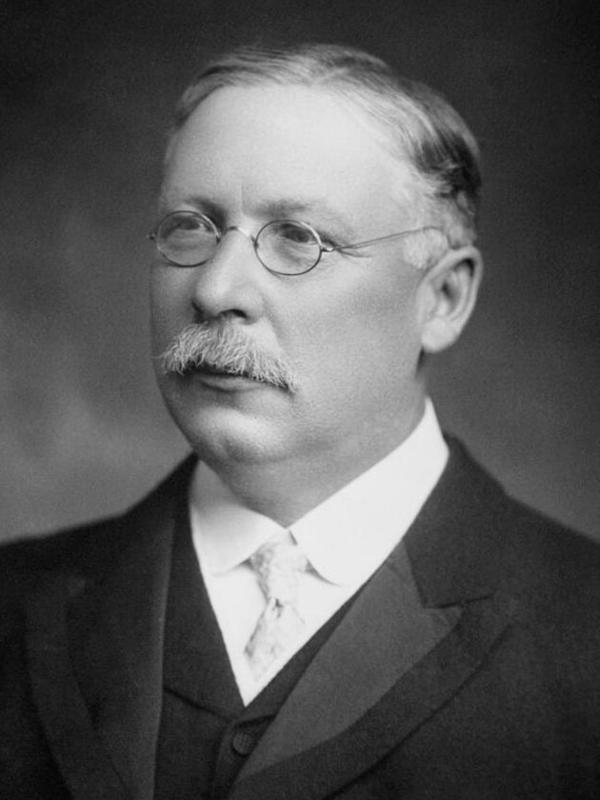
- Alexander Cameron Rutherford, c. 1908–1910
- Date formed: September 2, 1905
- Date dissolved: May 26, 1910

People and organisations
- Monarch: Edward VII; George V
- Lieutenant Governor: George H. V. Bulyea
- Premier: Alexander Cameron Rutherford
- Member party: Alberta Liberal Party
- Status in legislature: Majority

History
- Elections: 1905; 1909
- Legislature terms: 1st Alberta Legislature; 2nd Alberta Legislature
- Successor: Sifton Ministry

The Rutherford Ministry was the combined Cabinet (called Executive Council of Alberta), chaired by Premier Alexander Cameron Rutherford, and Ministers that governed Alberta from the day following the province's Confederation into Canada on September 2, 1905, to part way through the 2nd Alberta Legislature on May 26, 1910.

The Executive Council (commonly known as the cabinet) was made up of members of the Alberta Liberal Party which held a majority of seats in the Legislative Assembly of Alberta. The cabinet was appointed by the Lieutenant Governor of Alberta on the advice of the Premier.

Following the repercussions of the Alberta and Great Waterways Railway scandal, Rutherford resigned as Premier of Alberta on May 26, 1910, and was replaced by Arthur Sifton and the Sifton Ministry.

== History ==
=== Formation ===
In February 1905, the federal government of Prime Minister Sir Wilfrid Laurier introduced legislation to create two new provinces (Alberta and Saskatchewan) from the Northwest Territories. Though Haultain wanted the new provinces to be governed on the same nonpartisan basis as the Territories had been, the Liberal Laurier was expected to recommend a Liberal to serve as Lieutenant-Governor, and the Lieutenant-Governor was expected to call on a Liberal to form the new province's first government. Frank Oliver was the province's most prominent Liberal, but he had just been named federal Minister of the Interior and was not interested in leaving Ottawa. Peter Talbot was Laurier's preferred candidate, but he expected to be appointed to the Senate and found the latter prospect more congenial than serving as Premier of Alberta. Both men supported Rutherford, but neither was enthusiastic about doing so. In August, George H. V. Bulyea was appointed Alberta's first Lieutenant-Governor and later that month the Alberta Liberals selected Rutherford as their first leader.

A final barrier was removed a few days later, when Frederick W. A. G. Haultain, who was a Conservative federally but who was thought to be a potential leader of a coalition government, announced that he would stay in Regina to lead the Saskatchewan Conservatives. On September 2, Bulyea asked Rutherford to form the first government of Alberta.

=== Cabinet selection ===
After accepting the position of premier, Rutherford selected a geographically diverse cabinet on September 6: Edmonton's Charles Wilson Cross as Attorney-General, Calgary's William Henry Cushing as Minister of Public Works, Medicine Hat's William Finlay as Minister of Agriculture and Provincial Secretary, and Lethbridge's George DeVeber as Minister without Portfolio. Rutherford kept for himself the positions of Provincial Treasurer and Minister of Education.

=== 1909 shuffle ===
The Rutherford led Liberals gained a strong mandate in the March 1909 election and continued to form government. Provincial Secretary and Minister of Agriculture William Finlay was re-elected, but resigned from cabinet shortly after the election in November 1909 due to his poor health. Rutherford appointed Duncan Marshall to cabinet as the Provincial Secretary and Minister of Agriculture, and appointed William Ashbury Buchanan and Prosper-Edmond Lessard as Minister without portfolio.

== List of ministers ==
Name		Date Appointed	Date Departed
Alexander Cameron Rutherford	President of the Executive Council (Premier)	September 2, 1905	May 26, 1910
Alexander Cameron Rutherford	Provincial Treasurer	September 8, 1905	May 26, 1910
William Finlay	Provincial Secretary	September 8, 1905	November 1, 1909
Duncan Marshall	Provincial Secretary	November 1, 1909	May 31, 1910
Charles Wilson Cross	Attorney General	September 8, 1905	March 8, 1910
William Finlay	Minister of Agriculture	September 8, 1905	November 1, 1909
Duncan Marshall	Minister of Agriculture	November 1, 1909	August 12, 1921
Alexander Cameron Rutherford	Minister of Education	September 8, 1905	May 26, 1910
William Henry Cushing	Minister of Public Works	September 8, 1905	February 14, 1910
Leverett George DeVeber	Minister Without Portfolio	September 9, 1905	March 8, 1906
William Ashbury Buchanan	Minister Without Portfolio	November 1, 1909	March 8, 1910
Prosper-Edmond Lessard	Minister Without Portfolio	November 1, 1909	May 26, 1910

== See also ==
- Executive Council of Alberta
- List of Alberta provincial ministers
