= Brian C. Downey =

Canadian politician

MLA for Stettler
- In office 1986–1989
- Preceded by: Graham Harle
- Succeeded by: Don Getty

Personal details
- Born: November 5, 1950 Castor, Alberta
- Died: January 12, 2012 (aged 61) Red Deer, Alberta
- Party: Progressive Conservative Association of Alberta

Brian Clifford Downey (November 5, 1950 – January 12, 2012) was a politician from Alberta, Canada.

Born in Castor, Alberta to Clifford and Doreen Downey, Brian Downey was first elected to the Legislative Assembly of Alberta for the riding of Stettler as a Progressive Conservative member during the 1986 Alberta general election. He served his first term as a backbencher in Don Getty's government. He was re-elected for his second term in 1989.

However, during that election, Premier Getty was defeated in his own riding of Edmonton-Whitemud. Downey resigned as the member for Stettler so that Getty could run in a by-election. Under long-standing practice in Westminster systems, if the party leader has no seat, another legislator in their party resigns to give the leader a chance to get into the chamber via a by-election.

After Downey retired from politics he was appointed as enhancement co-ordinator of Alberta Hail and Crop Insurance Corporation. He was later appointed Chairman of the Alberta Grain Commission.

== Personal life ==
His father, Cliff, was also a politician, serving as the Progressive Conservative MP for Battle River for one term from 1968 until 1972.

On January 12, 1971, he married Trudy Fuller of Alliance, Alberta, and they returned to Castor to farm. They had two children, Allison and Dustin.

Brian Downey died in Red Deer in 2012, aged 61, after a brief illness.
