= Herbert Ash =

Canadian politician

Herbert Joseph Ash
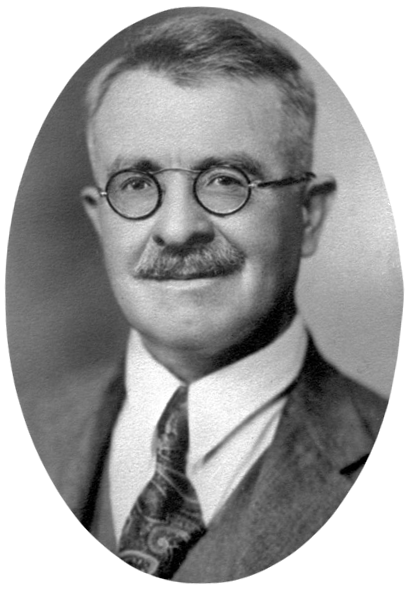

Member of the Legislative Assembly of Alberta
- In office 1935–1940
- Preceded by: Frank Grisdale
- Succeeded by: Norman Cook
- Constituency: Olds

Personal details
- Born: March 13, 1878 London, England
- Died: March 14, 1959 (aged 81)

Herbert Joseph Ash (1878–1959) was a provincial level politician from Alberta, Canada. He served as a member of the Legislative Assembly of Alberta from 1935 to 1940. Ash served as a member of the Governing Social Credit caucus, and later as an Independent Social Credit member while representing the electoral district of Olds.

== Political career ==
Ash ran for a seat to the Alberta Legislature in the 1935 Alberta general election. He won the electoral district of Olds as a candidate for the Social Credit party. Ash won a huge majority taking 66% of the vote defeating three other candidates including incumbent Agriculture Minister Frank Grisdale. In 1937, Ash was one of the insurgents in the Social Credit backbenchers' revolt.

Ash was removed from the Social Credit caucus citing a difference of opinion with Premier William Aberhart in 1940. The Social Credit Candidate Advisory Board refused to let him run for the party. He was dropped as a candidate by the Social Credit advisory board. Ash decided to stand for re-election anyway as an Independent Social Credit candidate.

Ash faced off in a three-way battle with Grisdale, who this time ran as an Independent and Social Credit candidate Norman Cook. The first vote showed Ash easily defeated running a distant third place. Grisdale was leading 110 votes ahead of Cook. Grisdale did not have a 50% majority so the Ash's second preferences were counted. Most of the second choices gave Cook just enough votes to win the district and defeat Grisdale.
