= Chester Reynolds =

Canadian politician (1902–1983)

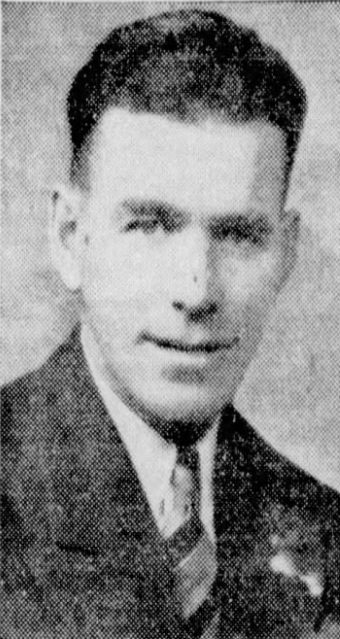
- Reynolds in 1942

Member of the Legislative Assembly of Alberta
- In office March 21, 1940 – August 7, 1944
- Preceded by: Charles Cockroft
- Succeeded by: William S. Mackie
- Constituency: Stettler

Personal details
- Born: Chester Ambrose Reynolds; September 24, 1902 Chicago, Illinois, U.S.
- Died: May 1, 1983 (aged 80) Vancouver, British Columbia, Canada
- Party: Social Credit Party of Alberta
- Spouse: Helen Mary Long (m. 1938)
- Children: 4
- Relatives: Ryan Reynolds (grandson)
- Occupation: Farmer

Chester Ambrose Reynolds (September 24, 1902 – May 1, 1983) was a Canadian provincial politician from Alberta. He served as a member of the Legislative Assembly of Alberta from 1940 to 1944, sitting as a Social Credit member from the constituency of Stettler.

== Early life and education ==
Reynolds was born September 24, 1902, in Chicago, Illinois to William Francis Reynolds (1863–1949) and Elizabeth Frances Reynolds (née Crowe; 1872–1949). The family immigrated from Ireland to Canada in 1906; he was educated in Gadsby, Alberta.

Reynolds farmed in the Gadsby area until around 1934. He then worked for the Provincial Government, specializing in promoting the welfare of horses. He held this position until he resigned in the spring of 1940 to run for the Stettler riding as the Social Credit candidate.

== Political career ==
Reynolds was elected in the 1940 Alberta general election to the 9th Alberta Legislature for the constituency of Stettler as a member of the Social Credit Party. Reynolds received slightly over 50 percent of the vote, defeating his Independent opponent L. V. Lohr by 817 votes, and the Co-operative Commonwealth candidate H. H. Turner by 1,884 votes. Reynolds did not contest the 1944 Alberta general election.

== Personal life ==
On June 29, 1938, Reynolds married Helen Long of Lacombe, Alberta. He was the paternal grandfather of actor Ryan Reynolds.
