= Robert L. Shaw =

Canadian politician

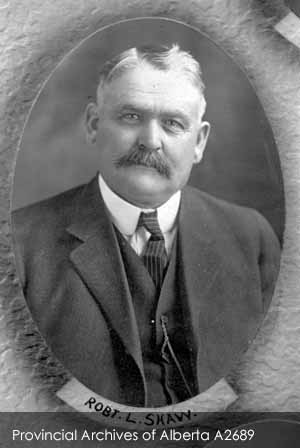

Member of the Legislative Assembly of Alberta
- In office March 22, 1909 – June 6, 1917
- Preceded by: District Established
- Succeeded by: Edward Prudden
- Constituency: Stettler

Personal details
- Born: November 27, 1865 Roseburg, Oregon
- Died: January 22, 1930 (aged 64) Vancouver, British Columbia
- Party: Liberal
- Spouse: Nettie Sloan (m. 1894)
- Occupation: Farmer; businessman; politician

Robert L. Shaw (November 27, 1865 – January 22, 1930) was a politician from Alberta, Canada.

Shaw was first elected to the Alberta Legislature in the 1909 Alberta general election. He defeated Conservative candidate J.K. Creighton in a landslide to become the first MLA for the new Stettler electoral district. As a Member of the Legislative Assembly, Shaw campaigned for a court house in Stettler, which was approved in 1913.

Shaw would be re-elected to a second term in the 1913 Alberta general election. He won that election with a plurality of just 21 votes over Conservative challenger George McMorris. Shaw would serve the remainder of his second term before retiring from provincial politics in 1917.

Shaw moved to Vancouver following the death of his spouse in 1924. Shaw died in Vancouver on January 22, 1930, at the age of 64.

Legislative Assembly of Alberta
Preceded by New District	MLA Stettler; 1909–1917	Succeeded by Edward Prudden
