= Lawrence Peterson =

Canadian politician

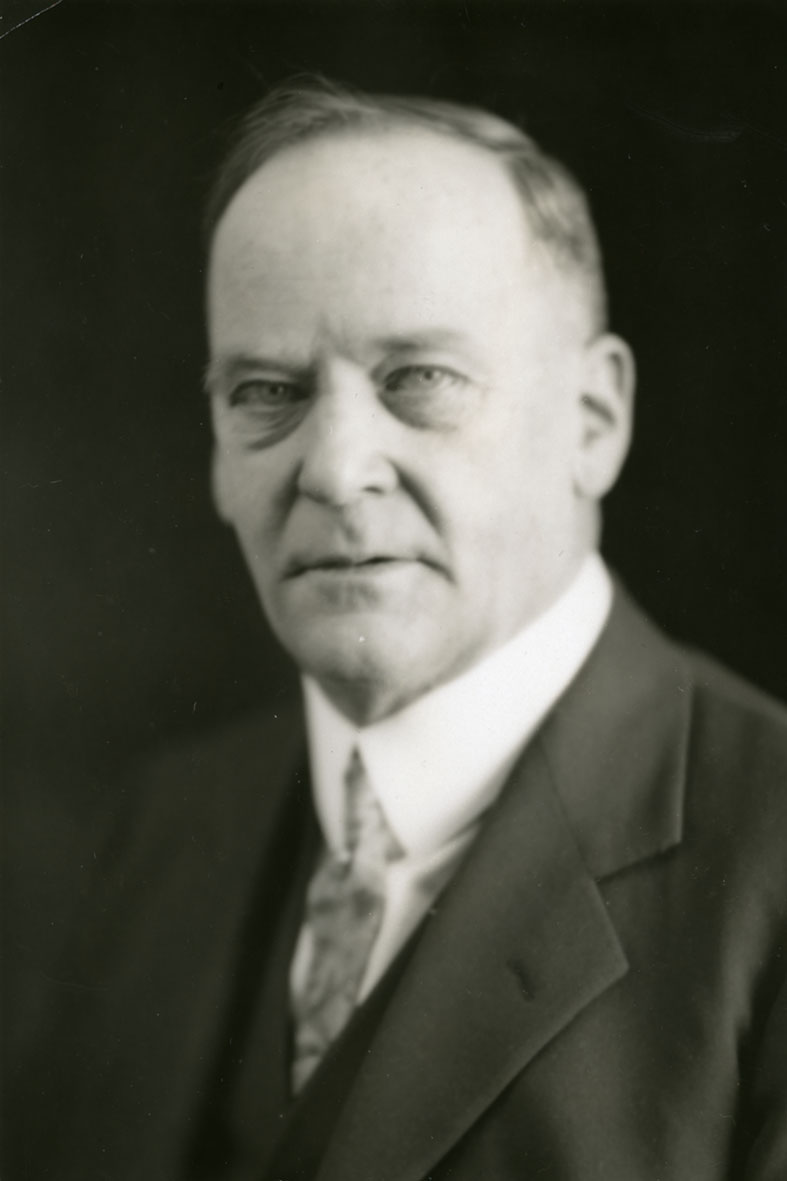

Member of the Legislative Assembly of Alberta
- In office July 18, 1921 – June 19, 1930
- Preceded by: Archibald McLean
- Succeeded by: John MacLellan
- Constituency: Taber

Personal details
- Born: April 12, 1873 Provo, Utah, U.S.
- Died: September 7, 1951 (aged 78) Kathryn, Alberta, Canada
- Party: United Farmers
- Occupation: politician

Lawrence Peter Peterson (April 12, 1873 – September 7, 1951) was a provincial politician from Alberta, Canada. He served as a member of the Legislative Assembly of Alberta from 1921 to 1930 sitting with the United Farmers caucus in government.

== Political career ==
Peterson ran for a seat to the Alberta Legislature for the first time in the 1921 Alberta general election. He stood as a United Farmers candidate in the electoral district of Taber and won a close race over incumbent Archibald McLean to pick up the seat for his party.

Peterson ran for a second term in office in the 1926 Alberta general election. He lost some of his popular vote from the last election but defeated two other candidates with a large majority.

Peterson did not run for a third term in office and retired at dissolution of the assembly in 1930.
