= William S. Mackie =

Canadian politician

Member of the Legislative Assembly of Alberta
- In office August 8, 1944 – August 4, 1952
- Preceded by: Chester Reynolds
- Succeeded by: John Etter Clark
- Constituency: Stettler

Personal details
- Born: April 21, 1879 Athens, Ontario
- Died: April 12, 1961 (aged 81)
- Party: Social Credit Party of Alberta
- Spouse: Martha Stauffer (m. 1909)
- Children: four
- Occupation: insurance agent; politician

William S. Mackie (April 21, 1879 – April 12, 1961) was a provincial politician from Alberta, Canada. He served as a member of the Legislative Assembly of Alberta from 1944 to 1952, sitting as a Social Credit member from the constituency of Stettler.

== Early life ==
William S. Mackie was born April 21, 1879, in Athens, Ontario, to John Mackie and Vina L. Root. Mackie moved to Alberta with his family to the Lacombe area in 1902. Mackie married Martha Stauffer on December 8, 1909. Mackie moved to the Stettler area in 1906 following the railway.

== Political career ==
Mackie was elected in the 1944 Alberta general election to the 10th Alberta Legislature for the constituency of Stettler as a member of the Social Credit Party. Mackie received 60.1 per cent of the vote, defeating Co-operative Commonwealth candidate Arthur H. Rowe and Independent Cornelius F. Pals.

Mackie was re-elected in the 1948 Alberta general election, receiving 77.3 per cent of the vote, defeating Co-operative Commonwealth candidate Joe J. Tipman.

== Later life ==
Mackie moved to Calgary in 1957, and died at the age of 82 in April 1961.
