= Albert Sanders =

Canadian politician

Albert Leroy Sanders
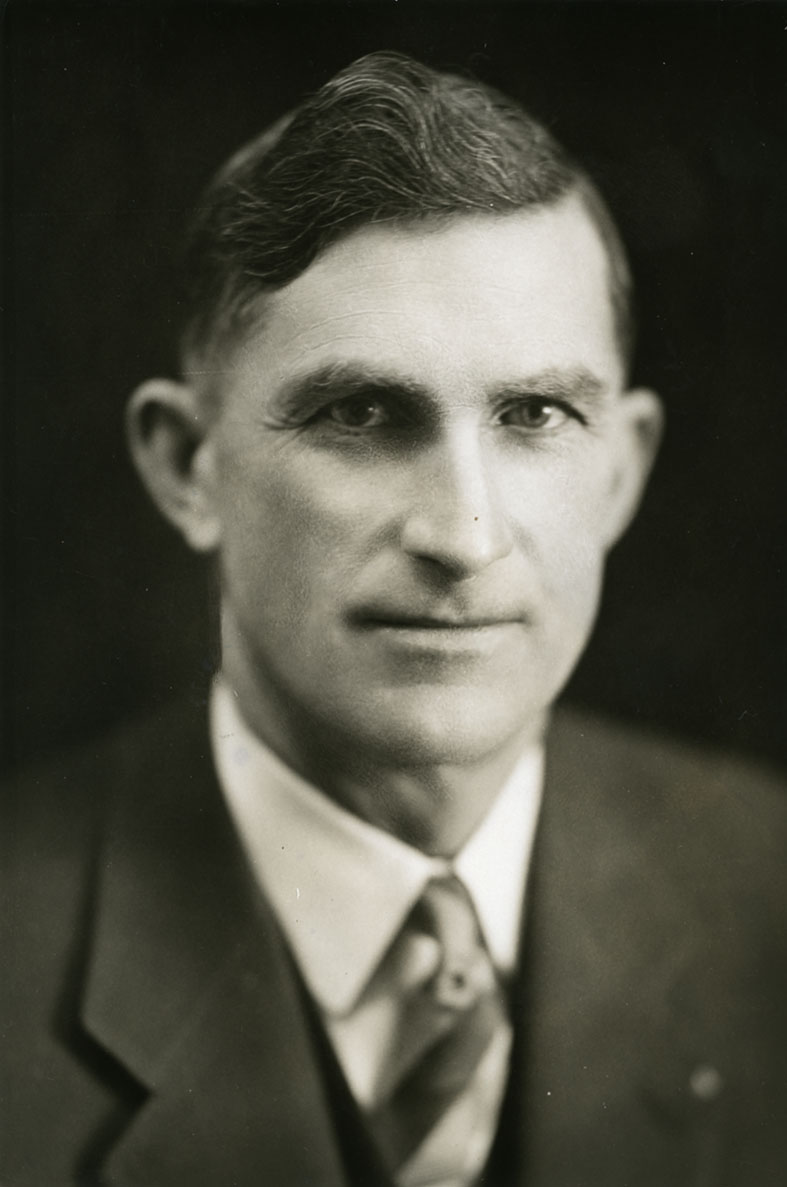

Member of the Legislative Assembly of Alberta
- In office July 18, 1921 – August 22, 1935
- Preceded by: Edward Prudden
- Succeeded by: Charles Cockroft
- Constituency: Stettler

Personal details
- Born: May 22, 1889 Glenwood, Minnesota
- Died: March 29, 1957 (aged 67)
- Party: United Farmers
- Occupation: politician

Albert Leroy Sanders (May 22, 1889 – March 29, 1957) was a provincial politician from Alberta, Canada. He served as a member of the Legislative Assembly of Alberta from 1921 to 1935 sitting with the United Farmers caucus in government.

== Political career ==
Sanders ran for a seat to the Alberta Legislature as a candidate for the United Farmers in the electoral district of Stettler for the 1921 Alberta general election. He defeated incumbent MLA Edward Prudden with a landslide majority to pick up the seat for his party.

Sanders ran for a second term in the 1926 Alberta general election. He faced a three way battle, and lost a significant portion of his popular vote from the previous election but still took the district with a sizable majority over the other candidates.

Sanders ran for a third term in the 1930 Alberta general election. He continued to lose his vote share and faced a strong challenge from Conservative candidate H.A. Blair who also ran in the previous election. Sanders managed to hang on and win his seat taking just over half the popular vote.

The 1935 Alberta general election would see Sanders run for his fourth term. He would be defeated in a landslide by Social Credit candidate Charles Cockroft finishing a distant third in the four way race.

Sanders died on March 29, 1957. He was buried at Gilbert Cemetery in Clearwater County, Idaho.
