= Jack Robertson (politician) =

Canadian politician

Jack George Robertson

Member of the Legislative Assembly of Alberta
- In office August 30, 1971 – December 7, 1971
- Preceded by: Galen Norris
- Succeeded by: Graham Harle
- Constituency: Stettler

Personal details
- Born: November 11, 1928
- Died: December 7, 1971 (aged 43)
- Party: Progressive Conservative

Jack George Robertson (November 11, 1928 – December 7, 1971) was a provincial politician from Alberta, Canada. He served as a member of the Legislative Assembly of Alberta in 1971, sitting with the governing Progressive Conservative caucus, until his death on December 7, 1971.

== Political career ==
Robertson ran for a seat to the Alberta Legislature in the 1971 Alberta general election. He defeated Social Credit incumbent Galen Norris in a hotly contested straight fight to pick up the Stettler electoral district for the Progressive Conservatives.

Robertson died on December 7, 1971.
