= Charles Cockroft =

Canadian politician (1887–1970)

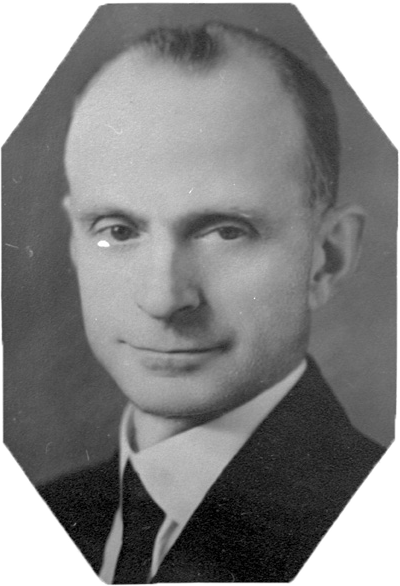

Member of the Legislative Assembly of Alberta
- In office 1935–1940
- Preceded by: Albert Sanders
- Succeeded by: Chester Reynolds
- Constituency: Stettler

Personal details
- Born: March 20, 1887 Leeds, England, United Kingdom
- Died: October 16, 1970 (aged 83) White Rock, British Columbia, Canada
- Party: Social Credit

Charles C. Cockroft (March 20, 1887 – October 16, 1970) was a provincial politician from Alberta, Canada. He served as a member of the Legislative Assembly of Alberta from 1935 to 1940, sitting with the Social Credit caucus in government. He was Provincial Treasurer of Alberta from September 3, 1935 to February 2, 1937.
