= Erskine, Alberta =

Erskine
- Hamlet
- Location of Erskine Erskine (Canada)
- Coordinates: 52°19′16″N 112°52′47″W
- Country: Canada
- Province: Alberta
- Region: Central Alberta
- Census division: 7
- Municipal district: County of Stettler No. 6

Government
  - Type: Unincorporated
  - Governing body: County of Stettler No. 6 Council

Area (2021)
  - Land: 0.86 km^{2} (0.33 sq mi)

Population (2021)
  - Total: 319
  - Density: 371.3/km^{2} (962/sq mi)
- Time zone: UTC−06:00 (Alberta Time)
- Area codes: 403, 587, 825

Erskine (/ˈɜːrskən/) is a hamlet in Alberta, Canada, within County of Stettler No. 6. Previously an incorporated municipality, Erskine dissolved from village status on May 10, 1946, to become part of the Municipal District of Waverly No. 367.

Erskine is located approximately 12 kilometres (7.5 mi) west of Stettler, 15 kilometres (9.3 mi) south of Rochon Sands and 64 kilometres (40 mi) east of Red Deer. It was established in 1905 and named after British jurist Thomas Erskine, 1st Baron Erskine (1750–1823).

== History ==
Erskine was home to one of the worst mass slayings in Alberta when Social Credit Stettler representative John Clark murdered seven people before committing suicide on June 3, 1956.

== Demographics ==
In the 2021 Census of Population conducted by Statistics Canada, Erskine had a population of 319 living in 136 of its 140 total private dwellings, a change of 13.1% from its 2016 population of 282. With a land area of 0.86 km^{2} (0.33 sq mi), it had a population density of 370.9/km^{2} (960.7/sq mi) in 2021.

As a designated place in the 2016 Census of Population conducted by Statistics Canada, Erskine had a population of 282 living in 122 of its 134 total private dwellings, a change of −2.8% from its 2011 population of 290. With a land area of 0.86 km^{2} (0.33 sq mi), it had a population density of 327.9/km^{2} (849.3/sq mi) in 2016.

== See also ==
- List of communities in Alberta
- List of designated places in Alberta
- List of former urban municipalities in Alberta
- List of hamlets in Alberta
