= Norman E. Cook =

Canadian politician

Member of the Legislative Assembly of Alberta for Olds
- In office 1940–1950
- Preceded by: Herbert Ash
- Succeeded by: Frederick Niddrie

Personal details
- Born: December 9, 1888 Woodstock, Ontario
- Died: August 5, 1950 (aged 61) Olds, Alberta
- Party: Social Credit

Norman E. Cook (December 9, 1888 – August 5, 1950) was a provincial level politician from Alberta, Canada. He served as a member of the Legislative Assembly of Alberta from 1940 until his death in 1950. He served in the governing Social Credit caucus during his time in the Legislature representing the electoral district of Olds.

== Political career ==
Cook first ran for a seat in the Alberta Legislature in the 1926 Alberta general election. He contested the Olds provincial electoral district as a Liberal candidate. He was handily defeated finishing a distant second to Incumbent United Farmers of Alberta MLA Nelson Smith.

Cook ran for Social Credit nomination for Olds in the 1935 Alberta general election but lost to Herbert Ash who would end up becoming the new MLA. Just prior to the 1940 Alberta general election, Ash was removed from the Social Credit caucus and Cook was picked as the new candidate by the Social Credit Advisory Board.

Ash decided to run anyway under the Independent Social Credit banner. The race was joined by Independent candidate Frank Grisdale, the former Minister of Agriculture whom Ash defeated in 1935. On election night, Grisdale was leading Cook by 110 votes on the first count, while Ash was trailing a distant third. Grisdale did not gain a 50% majority, and was defeated by less than 100 votes after Ash second choice preferences were cast.

Cook ran for his second term in office in the 1944 Alberta general election. Despite running against two other candidates, he swept the district with nearly 67% of the popular vote. Cook continued to gain in popularity, winning a super majority of 74% in his re-election bid for the 1948 Alberta general election.

Cook died in 1950, causing his position to become vacant.
