= Taber (provincial electoral district) =

Defunct provincial electoral district in Alberta, Canada

Coordinates: 49.77°N 112.15°W

Alberta electoral district

Defunct provincial electoral district
- Legislature: Legislative Assembly of Alberta
- District created: 1913
- District abolished: 1963
- First contested: 1913
- Last contested: 1959

Taber was a provincial electoral district in Alberta, Canada, mandated to return a single member to the Legislative Assembly of Alberta from 1913 to 1963.

== History ==
The Taber electoral district was formed prior to the 1913 Alberta general election from the south-eastern portion of the Lethbridge District. It would be abolished prior to the 1963 Alberta general election, and the territory would be split between the Taber-Warner and Little Bow electoral districts.

=== Members of the Legislative Assembly (MLAs) ===
Members of the Legislative Assembly for Taber
Assembly	Years	Member	Party
See Lethbridge District from 1909-1913
3rd	1913–1917	Archibald J. McLean	Liberal
4th	1917–1921	Archibald J. McLean	Liberal
5th	1921–1926	Lawrence Peterson	United Farmers
6th	1926–1930	Lawrence Peterson	United Farmers
7th	1930–1935	James Hanson	Social Credit
8th	1935–1940	Roy S. Lee	Social Credit
9th	1940–1944	Roy S. Lee	Social Credit
10th	1944–1948	Roy S. Lee	Social Credit
11th	1948–1952	Roy S. Lee	Social Credit
12th	1952–1955	Roy S. Lee	Social Credit
13th	1955–1959	Roy S. Lee	Social Credit
14th	1959–1963	Roy S. Lee	Social Credit
See Taber-Warner electoral district from 1963-1997 and Little Bow electoral district from 1963-2019

== Election results ==
=== 1913 ===
1913 Alberta general election
Party	Candidate	Votes	%	±%
Liberal	Archibald J. McLean	1,231	68.16%	–
Conservative	William Carlos Ives	341	18.88%	–
Socialist	Thomas E. Smith	234	12.96%	–
Total		1,806	–	–
Rejected, spoiled and declined		N/A	–	–
Eligible electors / turnout		3,341	54.06%	–
Liberal pickup new district.				
Source(s) Source: "Taber Official Results 1913 Alberta general election". Alberta Heritage Community Foundation.

=== 1917 ===
1917 Alberta general election
Party	Candidate	Votes	%	±%
Liberal	Archibald J. McLean	1,804	63.75%	-4.42%
Conservative	Thomas O. King	1,026	36.25%	17.37%
Total		2,830	–	–
Rejected, spoiled and declined		N/A	–	–
Eligible electors / turnout		4,965	57.00%	2.94%
Liberal hold		Swing		-10.89%
Source(s) Source: "Taber Official Results 1917 Alberta general election". Alberta Heritage Community Foundation.

=== 1921 ===
1921 Alberta general election
Party	Candidate	Votes	%	±%
United Farmers	Lawrence Peterson	2,309	53.70%	–
Liberal	Archibald J. McLean	1,991	46.30%	-17.44%
Total		4,300	–	–
Rejected, spoiled and declined		N/A	–	–
Eligible electors / turnout		5,638	76.27%	19.27%
United Farmers gain from Liberal		Swing		-10.05%
Source(s) Source: "Taber Official Results 1921 Alberta general election". Alberta Heritage Community Foundation.

=== 1926 ===
1926 Alberta general election
Party	Candidate	Votes	%	±%
United Farmers	Lawrence Peterson	1,929	60.49%	6.79%
Liberal	J. J. Horrigan	709	22.23%	-24.07%
Conservative	J. H. Prowse	551	17.28%	–
Total		3,189	–	–
Rejected, spoiled and declined		173	–	–
Eligible electors / turnout		5,138	65.43%	-10.83%
United Farmers hold		Swing		15.43%
Source(s) Source: "Taber Official Results 1926 Alberta general election". Alberta Heritage Community Foundation.

=== 1930 ===
1930 Alberta general election
Party	Candidate	Votes	%	±%
United Farmers	John J. MacLellan	1,848	54.93%	-5.55%
Independent	J. E. Evanson	1,516	45.07%	–
Total		3,364	–	–
Rejected, spoiled and declined		122	–	–
Eligible electors / turnout		4,829	72.19%	6.75%
United Farmers hold		Swing		-14.19%
Source(s) Source: "Taber Official Results 1930 Alberta general election". Alberta Heritage Community Foundation.

=== 1935 ===
1935 Alberta general election
Party	Candidate	Votes	%	±%
Social Credit	James Hanson	2,879	67.30%	–
United Farmers	John J. MacLellan	757	17.70%	-37.24%
Liberal	B. L. Cooke	642	15.01%	–
Total		4,278	–	–
Rejected, spoiled and declined		176	–	–
Eligible electors / turnout		5,589	79.69%	7.50%
Social Credit gain from United Farmers		Swing		19.87%
Source(s) Source: "Taber Official Results 1935 Alberta general election". Alberta Heritage Community Foundation.

=== 1940 ===
1940 Alberta general election
Party	Candidate	Votes 1st count	%	Votes final count	±%
Social Credit	Roy S. Lee	1,879	48.96%	1,998	-18.34%
Independent	J. L. Nelson	1,383	36.03%	1,618	–
Co-operative Commonwealth	W. W. Scott	576	15.01%	–	–
Total		3,838	–	–	–
Rejected, spoiled and declined		204	–	–	–
Eligible electors / turnout		5,050	80.04%	0.35%	–
Social Credit hold		Swing		-18.34%	
Source(s) Source: "Taber Official Results 1940 Alberta general election". Alberta Heritage Community Foundation. Instant-runoff voting requires a candidate to receive a plurality (greater than 50%) of the votes. As no candidate received a plurality of votes, the bottom candidate was eliminated and their 2nd place votes were applied to both other candidates until one received a plurality.

=== 1944 ===
1944 Alberta general election
Party	Candidate	Votes	%	±%
Social Credit	Roy S. Lee	2,490	69.51%	20.56%
Co-operative Commonwealth	Leo Hinds	679	18.96%	3.95%
Liberal	E. N. Davidson	413	11.53%	–
Total		3,582	–	–
Rejected, spoiled and declined		130	–	–
Eligible electors / turnout		5,028	73.83%	-6.21%
Social Credit hold		Swing		18.82%
Source(s) Source: "Taber Official Results 1944 Alberta general election". Alberta Heritage Community Foundation.

=== 1948 ===
1948 Alberta general election
Party	Candidate	Votes	%	±%
Social Credit	Roy S. Lee	2,559	72.64%	3.12%
Co-operative Commonwealth	Guy F. Harris	501	14.22%	-4.74%
Liberal	Richard L. Higgins	463	13.14%	1.61%
Total		3,523	–	–
Rejected, spoiled and declined		442	–	–
Eligible electors / turnout		6,333	62.61%	-11.22%
Social Credit hold		Swing		3.93%
Source(s) Source: "Taber Official Results 1948 Alberta general election". Alberta Heritage Community Foundation.

=== 1952 ===
1952 Alberta general election
Party	Candidate	Votes	%	±%
Social Credit	Roy S. Lee	2,809	79.67%	7.03%
Liberal	Harold Wood	717	20.33%	7.19%
Total		3,526	–	–
Rejected, spoiled and declined		279	–	–
Eligible electors / turnout		6,566	57.95%	-4.66%
Social Credit hold		Swing		0.46%
Source(s) Source: "Taber Official Results 1952 Alberta general election". Alberta Heritage Community Foundation.

=== 1955 ===
1955 Alberta general election
Party	Candidate	Votes	%	±%
Social Credit	Roy S. Lee	2,788	61.02%	-18.65%
Liberal	Fred M. Pritchard	1,186	25.96%	5.62%
Independent Social Credit	Ben Platt	595	13.02%	–
Total		4,569	–	–
Rejected, spoiled and declined		238	–	–
Eligible electors / turnout		7,070	67.99%	10.04%
Social Credit hold		Swing		-12.13%
Source(s) Source: "Taber Official Results 1955 Alberta general election". Alberta Heritage Community Foundation.

=== 1959 ===
1959 Alberta general election
Party	Candidate	Votes	%	±%
Social Credit	Roy S. Lee	3,678	78.01%	16.99%
Progressive Conservative	Leslie P. Cluff	1,037	21.99%	–
Total		4,715	–	–
Rejected, spoiled and declined		22	–	–
Eligible electors / turnout		7,518	63.01%	-4.98%
Social Credit hold		Swing		10.48%
Source(s) Source: "Taber Official Results 1959 Alberta general election". Alberta Heritage Community Foundation.

== Plebiscite results ==
=== 1957 liquor plebiscite ===
1957 Alberta liquor plebiscite results: Taber
Question A: Do you approve additional types of outlets for the sale of beer, wine and spirituous liquor subject to a local vote?
Ballot choice	Votes	%
No	1,923	67.14%
Yes	941	32.86%
Total votes	2,864	100%
Rejected, spoiled and declined	35	
6,627 eligible electors, turnout 43.75%

On October 30, 1957, a stand-alone plebiscite was held province wide in all 50 of the then current provincial electoral districts in Alberta. The government decided to consult Alberta voters to decide on liquor sales and mixed drinking after a divisive debate in the legislature. The plebiscite was intended to deal with the growing demand for reforming antiquated liquor control laws.

The plebiscite was conducted in two parts. Question A, asked in all districts, asked the voters if the sale of liquor should be expanded in Alberta, while Question B, asked in a handful of districts within the corporate limits of Calgary and Edmonton, asked if men and women should be allowed to drink together in establishments.

Province wide Question A of the plebiscite passed in 33 of the 50 districts while Question B passed in all five districts. Taber strongly voted against the proposal. The voter turnout in the district was light, and fell below the province wide average of 46%.

Official district returns were released to the public on December 31, 1957. The Social Credit government in power at the time did not consider the results binding. However the results of the vote led the government to repeal all existing liquor legislation and introduce an entirely new Liquor Act.

Municipal districts lying inside electoral districts that voted against the plebiscite such as Taber were designated Local Option Zones by the Alberta Liquor Control Board and considered effective dry zones. Business owners who wanted a licence had to petition for a binding municipal plebiscite in order to be granted a licence.

== See also ==
- List of Alberta provincial electoral districts
- Canadian provincial electoral districts
- Taber, a town in southern Alberta
