= Roy S. Lee =

Canadian politician (1887–1972)

Roy Smith Lee

Member of the Legislative Assembly of Alberta
- In office March 21, 1940 – June 17, 1963
- Preceded by: James Hansen
- Succeeded by: District abolished
- Constituency: Taber

Personal details
- Born: October 16, 1887
- Died: June 9, 1972 (aged 84)
- Party: Social Credit
- Occupation: politician

Roy Smith Lee (October 16, 1887 – June 9, 1972) was a provincial politician from Alberta, Canada. He served as a member of the Legislative Assembly of Alberta from 1940 to 1963 sitting with the Social Credit caucus in government.

== Political career ==
Lee ran for a seat to the Alberta Legislature in the 1940 Alberta general election as a Social Credit candidate in the electoral district of Taber. Lee faced a tough fight in the election as did not secure a clear majority on the first vote count. Despite getting few second choice preferences he earned enough to finish first.

While serving in his first term in the Legislature Lee introduced a motion to have all Japanese Settlers Removed from Alberta at the end of World War II. The motion received unanimous support. He also opposed Japanese working in the agriculture sector.

Lee ran for a second term in 1944 Alberta general election. He held his seat defeating two other candidates with a substantial majority on the first ballot.

The 1948 Alberta general election would see Lee run for his third term in office. For the third election in a row he increased his popular support. Lee was easily returned to office defeating two candidates.

Lee ran for a fourth term in office in the 1952 Alberta general election. He faced a two way race against Liberal candidate Harold Wood. Lee won the election easily with a landslide majority.

Lee ran for a fifth term in the 1955 Alberta general election. He defeated two other candidates with a smaller popular vote then 1952. Lee faced a potential split in the Social Credit ranks as Ben Platt ran as an Independent Social Credit candidate but finished a distant third place.

The 1959 Alberta general election would see Lee run for his sixth term in office. He ran in another two way race against Progressive Conservative candidate Leslie Cluff. Lee won the largest popular vote of his career to return to office with a landslide.

Lee retired from provincial politics at dissolution of the assembly in 1963.
