= John Etter Clark =

Canadian politician

Member of the Legislative Assembly of Alberta
- In office August 5, 1952 – June 3, 1956
- Preceded by: William Mackie
- Succeeded by: Galen Norris
- Constituency: Stettler

Personal details
- Born: March 29, 1915 Stettler, Alberta
- Died: June 3, 1956 (aged 41) near Erskine, Alberta
- Party: Social Credit
- Spouse: Margaret Clark
- Children: Jenena, Ross, Ann and Linda
- Occupation: Politician, teacher, farmer

John Etter Clark (March 29, 1915 – June 3, 1956) was a provincial politician, teacher and farmer from Alberta, Canada. He was a member of the Legislative Assembly of Alberta from 1952 until committing one of the deadliest mass murders in Alberta history and killing himself.

== Early life ==
John Etter Clark was born in Stettler, Alberta, in 1915. He became a part-time school teacher and a farmer. Clark inherited the 4.0 km^{2} (1,000-acre) farm founded by his father. He married Margaret Dinwoodie in 1947 and they had four children.

== Political career ==
Clark ran for a seat in the Alberta Legislature, representing the Stettler district, in the 1952 Alberta general election as a Social Credit candidate. The four-way race was hotly contested, and Clark won on the second vote count (under the instant-runoff voting system used at the time) to hold the district for his party.

Clark ran for a second term in the 1955 Alberta general election. He won a sizable majority to defeat two other candidates and hold his seat.

== Mass murder and subsequent suicide ==
On June 3, 1956, Pete Parrott, a neighbour residing on a farm leased from Clark next to his farm in Erskine, Alberta, stopped over for a social visit. He found six bodies and one wounded person, each shot at least once through the head with .22 caliber bullets, and one shot multiple times. The wounded victim was taken to a local hospital and died shortly after.

The Royal Canadian Mounted Police descended on the scene with 14 special field agents. Clark had fled and was not among the dead, who included his wife, son, three daughters, a hired farmhand and a visitor. The murder weapon was a single-shot .22 calibre rifle that Clark had borrowed from his uncle. He was expected to travel to Saskatchewan on June 1, 1956, to help manage the Social Credit campaign in the 1956 Saskatchewan general election, but failed to show up without explanation. The victims were identified as Margaret Clark, 36, Jenena Clark, 10, Ross Clark, 7, Ann Clark, 5, Linda Clark, 4, George Anderson, 20 and William Olah, 30.

Police found Clark's body lying on the edge of a dugout approximately 550 metres (600 yd) from the farmhouse where the murders took place. It had wounds from a single self-inflicted bullet through the head and the murder weapon lying at its feet. It was found adorned in night attire as if Clark had been preparing to go to bed. Thirty-two RCMP officers who travelled the range on horseback with a team of tracking dogs conducted the search. A team of three Mounties on a Royal Canadian Air Force Otter conducted an aerial search. The Mounties spotted Clark's body from the air a few hours after the search began.

Clark had previously been hospitalized for a month and a half after a nervous breakdown in 1954, and another during the legislature's 1956 spring session.

It, along with the Cook Family murders in 1959, were the deadliest mass murders in Alberta history, until Phu Lam killed nine in Edmonton in December 2014.
