= Roderick Macleod (Alberta politician) =

Canadian politician (1908–2004)

Roderick Angus Macleod

Member of the Legislative Assembly of Alberta
- In office 1959–1963
- Preceded by: Frederick Niddrie
- Succeeded by: District Abolished
- Constituency: Olds

Personal details
- Born: August 3, 1908
- Died: June 8, 2004 (aged 95)
- Party: Social Credit

Roderick Angus Macleod (August 3, 1908 – June 8, 2004) was a provincial level politician from Alberta, Canada. He served as a member of the Legislative Assembly of Alberta from 1959 to 1963. He served in the governing Social Credit caucus representing the electoral district of Olds.

== Political career ==
Macleod ran for a seat in the Alberta Legislature in a by-election held on February 9, 1959. He easily defeated W. Anderson to hold the electoral district for Social Credit. Macleod was forced to run for re-election that same year in the 1959 Alberta general election. He was returned to his seat after defeating Progressive Conservative candidate Bruce Hanson by similar margin as the by-election.

Olds electoral district was abolished in 1963, Macleod did not re-offer in a new district.
