= Duncan Marshall =

Canadian politician (1872–1946)

The Honourable Duncan Marshall
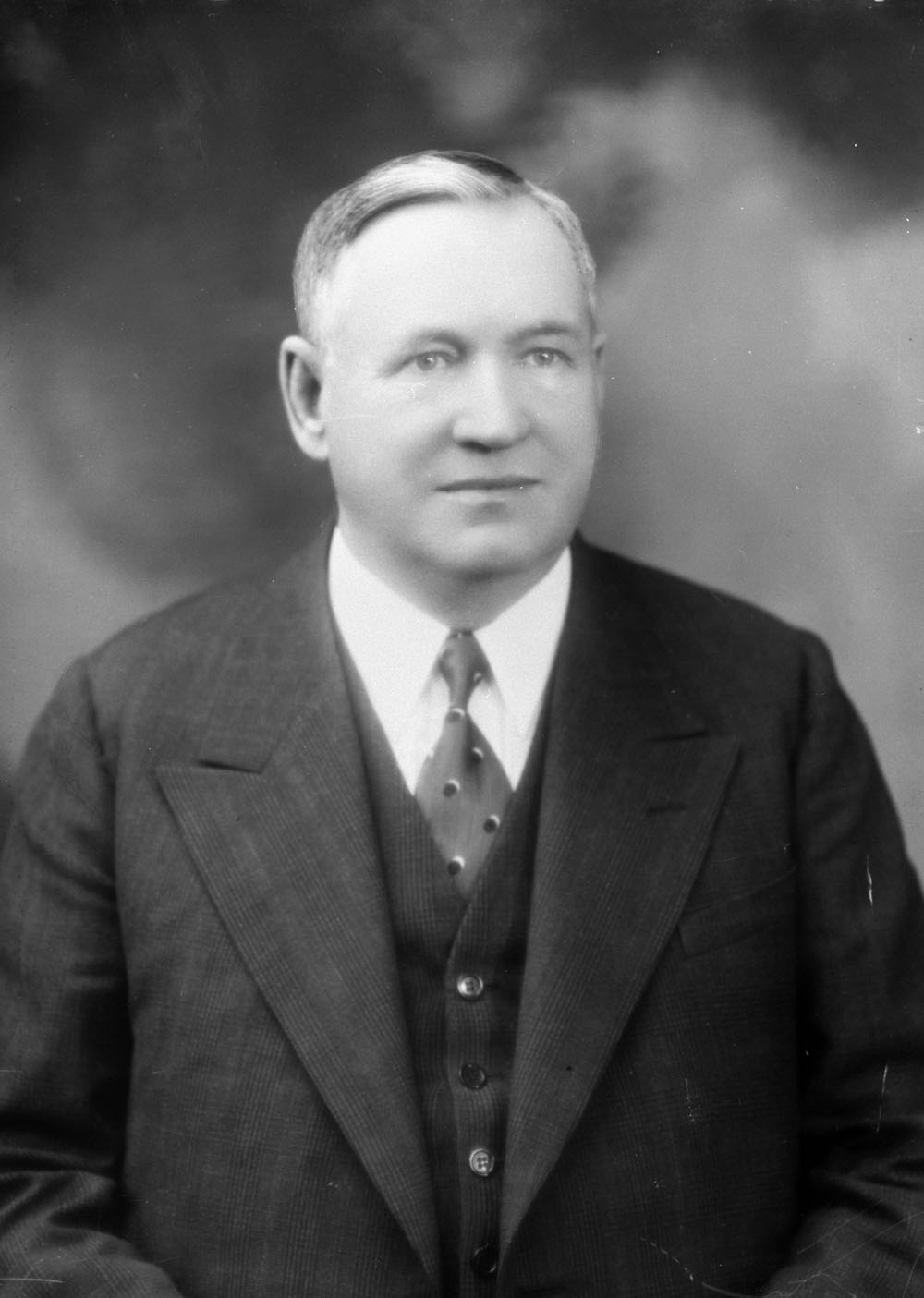
- The Hon. Duncan McLean Marshall

Canadian Senator from Ontario
- In office January 20, 1938 – January 16, 1946

Member of the Legislative Assembly of Alberta
- In office March 22, 1909 – July 17, 1921
- Preceded by: District established
- Succeeded by: Nelson S. Smith
- Constituency: Olds

Ontario Member of Provincial Parliament
- In office June 19, 1934 – August 25, 1937
- Preceded by: Thomas Laird Kennedy
- Succeeded by: Thomas Laird Kennedy
- Constituency: Peel

Personal details
- Born: Duncan McLean Marshall; September 24, 1872 Elderslie Township, Ontario
- Died: January 16, 1946 (aged 73)
- Party: Liberal (federal)
- Other political affiliations: Liberal (provincial)

Duncan McLean Marshall (September 24, 1872 – January 16, 1946) was a Canadian journalist, publisher, rancher and politician in the provinces of Ontario and Alberta.

Marshall represented the electoral district of Olds in the Legislative Assembly of Alberta, and served in the Cabinets of Premiers Alexander Cameron Rutherford, Arthur Sifton, and Charles Stuart as Alberta's second Minister of Agriculture from 1909 to 1921. Marshall later served as an Ontario Member of Provincial Parliament in Ontario for the electoral district of Peel, and was appointed to the Cabinet of Premier Mitchell Hepburn, serving as the Ontario's Minister of Agriculture from 1934 to 1937. Marshall was then appointed to the Senate of Canada in 1938, serving as a Senator from Ontario until his death in 1946.

== Early life ==
Marshall was born on September 24, 1872, in Elderslie Township, Ontario, to John Marshall and Margaret McMurchy. Marshall attended Walkerton High School and the Owen Sound Collegiate and Vocational Institute.

Marshall's first employment was as a teacher at Gillies Hill, Ontario, Canada.

By 1891 he was involved in the Patrons of Industry movement, working as an organizer for the farmers' lobby group and fraternal organization. In 1895 he was sent to Prince Edward Island and did organizing work there. He also worked in Nova Scotia and New Brunswick. Early success led to the creation of a weekly newspaper under the banner The Patron of Industry in January 1896, but it was closed in November of the same year. During the period Marshall attempted to turn to organization into a political party but did not succeed and he returned to Ontario. The Patrons of Industry was disbanded in 1898.

Marshall moved on to become the Grand Secretary and editor and publisher of the official organ of the Order of Good Templars, a temperance organization. Next he moved to Toronto where he helped publish a newspaper and eventually acquired several farm interest weeklies.

As a Liberal candidate, Marshall ran in the Muskoka riding in the 1904 Canadian federal election. He was defeated by Conservative candidate William Wright.

== Move to Alberta ==
In 1905 Marshall moved to Alberta and was for three years managing editor of the Edmonton Bulletin. He subsequently purchased a farm near Olds, Alberta and was successful as a cattle and horse breeder. He owned The Olds Gazette, a weekly newspaper in Olds, Alberta.

== Alberta politics ==
Marshall was an organizer for the Liberal Party of Alberta during Alberta's first provincial election in 1905. The Conservative leaning Calgary Herald wrote a scathing article on his political history during the run-up to the election, describing Marshall as a carpet-bagger. Marshall was elected to the Legislative Assembly of Alberta for the first time in the 1909 Alberta general election to the new Olds electoral district. He won the new district easily over Conservative candidate George McDonald.

Marshall was appointed to cabinet by Premier Alexander Cameron Rutherford to serve as the new Minister of Agriculture and Provincial Secretary November 1, 1909, following the resignation of William Finlay due to his poor health. Marshall survived a ministerial by-election held on November 23, 1909.

Shortly after the 1909 election, Rutherford's government came under intense scrutiny when it was accused of giving loan guarantees to private interests for the construction of the Alberta and Great Waterways (A&GW) Railway that substantially exceeded the cost of construction and which paid interest considerably above the market rate. It was also accused of exercising insufficient oversight over the railway's operations. The Alberta and Great Waterways Railway scandal became a crisis when Attorney General Charles Wilson Cross suddenly resigned from cabinet on March 9, 1910. The next day unsubstantiated rumors circulated that Marshall and Minister without Portfolio Prosper-Edmond Lessard had also resigned, though these proved false. Rutherford held his silence until March 11, when he told the Legislature that he had not accepted any resignations. He said that the only vacant cabinet post was the ministry of Public Works previously held by Cushing, and that he hoped to fill it soon. A commission of inquiry was called, and Premier Rutherford stepped down on May 26, 1909.

Marshall was re-appointed Minister of Agriculture under the new government of Arthur Lewis Sifton on June 1, 1910, but his provincial secretary position was given to Archibald J. McLean. Marshall was the only member of Rutherford's cabinet to carry on in the new Sifton cabinet.

One of his most notable achievements as Minister of Agriculture was the creation and setup of Demonstration Farms around the province in 1911. These farms later evolved into Agriculture training schools. The most notable of these schools are still in operation today as Lakeland College and Olds College. Duncan Marshall Place, the main administrative building at Olds College, is named after him.

Marshall ran for re-election in the 1913 Alberta general election. In that election he defeated Conservative challenger George Cloakey by just 54 votes.

Marshall ran against Cloakley again in the 1917 Alberta general election and again triumphed, substantially widening his plurality and winning comfortably.

The 1921 Alberta general election proved to be the end of the Liberal government and Marshall's political career in Alberta. Many candidates of the Charles Stewart led Liberals were defeated by United Farmers of Alberta candidates, and Liberals lost control of the legislature. Marshall lost his seat to United Farmers candidate Nelson S. Smith, who received a clear majority of votes (61 per cent of the vote). Historian Lewis Thomas credits the collapse of the Liberal Party and rise of the United Farmers to the sudden collapse of agricultural prices, the post-war economy and the organizational superiority of the United Farmers.

After Marshall's defeat in the provincial election, he ran for the Liberal Party of Canada in the 1921 Canadian federal election in East Calgary. He was defeated by Labour candidate William Irvine and finished the race a distant third, behind the Conservative candidate.

== Ontario legislature ==
Marshall was elected to the Legislative Assembly of Ontario for the Ontario Liberal Party in the 1934 Ontario general election for the Peel electoral district. In that election, he defeated longtime incumbent Conservative Thomas Kennedy. He was appointed Minister of Agriculture from July 10, 1934, to October 12, 1937, serving one term in the legislature. Upon his appointment to the cabinet, he became one of the few in Canadian history to hold the same ministerial portfolio in two different provinces.

Marshall and Kennedy would face each other again in the 1937 Ontario general election; this time, the results would be reversed, with Kennedy defeating Marshall.

== Senate appointment ==
Marshall was appointed to the Senate of Canada on January 20, 1938, by William Lyon Mackenzie King. He served in the Senate representing the Liberal Party of Canada until his death on January 16, 1946.

Public offices, Province of Alberta
Alberta provincial government of Charles Stewart
Alberta provincial government of Arthur Sifton
Alberta provincial government of Alexander Cameron Rutherford
Cabinet posts (2)
Predecessor	Office	Successor
William Finlay	Provincial Secretary; November 1, 1909–May 26, 1910	Archibald J. McLean
William Finlay	Minister of Agriculture; November 1, 1909–May 26, 1910; June 1, 1910–August 12, 1921; Reappointment following cabinet resignation	George Hoadley
Legislative Assembly of Alberta
Preceded by New District	MLA Olds; 1909–1921	Succeeded by Nelson S. Smith
Public offices, Province of Ontario
Hepburn ministry, Province of Ontario (1934–1942)
Preceded by Thomas Laird Kennedy	Minister of Agriculture; 1934–1937	Succeeded by Patrick Michael Dewan
Legislative Assembly of Ontario
Preceded by Thomas Laird Kennedy	Member for Peel; 1934–1937	Succeeded by Thomas Laird Kennedy
Public offices, Canada
Parliament of Canada
	Senator for Peel, Ontario; 1938–1946	
