= Stettler (provincial electoral district) =

Defunct provincial electoral district in Alberta, Canada

Coordinates: 52.34°N 112.72°W

Alberta electoral district

Defunct provincial electoral district
- Legislature: Legislative Assembly of Alberta
- District created: 1909
- District abolished: 1993
- First contested: 1909
- Last contested: 1989

Stettler was a provincial electoral district in Alberta, Canada, mandated to return a single member to the Legislative Assembly of Alberta from 1909 to 1993.

== History ==
The Stettler electoral district was formed in 1909 from the eastern portions of the Gleichen, Rosebud, Innisfail, Red Deer, and Lacombe electoral districts. The district is named after the town of Stettler.

The district elected its MLA using first past the post from 1909 to 1924, then switched to instant-runoff voting until 1956, when again it returned to first past the post.

MLA John Etter Clark died in mass murder/suicide in 1956, occasioning a by-election.

The Stettler electoral district was abolished in 1993 and combined with portions of the Lacombe electoral district to form Lacombe-Stettler electoral district.

=== Members of the Legislative Assembly (MLAs) ===
Members of the Legislative Assembly for Stettler
Assembly	Years	Member	Party
2nd	1909–1913	Robert L. Shaw	Liberal
3rd	1913–1917	Robert L. Shaw	Liberal
4th	1917–1921	Edward H. Prudden	Liberal
5th	1921–1926	Albert L. Sanders	United Farmers
6th	1926–1930	Albert L. Sanders	United Farmers
7th	1930–1935	Albert L. Sanders	United Farmers
8th	1935–1940	Charles Cockroft	Social Credit
9th	1940–1944	Chester A. Reynolds	Social Credit
10th	1944–1948	William S. Mackie	Social Credit
11th	1948–1952	William S. Mackie	Social Credit
12th	1952–1955	John Etter Clark	Social Credit
13th	1955–1959	John Etter Clark	Social Credit
14th	1959–1963	Galen C. Norris	Social Credit
15th	1963–1967	Galen C. Norris	Social Credit
16th	1967–1971	Galen C. Norris	Social Credit
17th	1971–1975	Jack G. Robertson	Progressive Conservative
18th	1975–1979	Graham L. Harle	Progressive Conservative
19th	1979–1982	Graham L. Harle	Progressive Conservative
20th	1982–1986	Graham L. Harle	Progressive Conservative
21st	1986–1989	Brian C. Downey	Progressive Conservative
22nd	1989–1989	Brian C. Downey	Progressive Conservative
22nd	1989–1993	Don Getty	Progressive Conservative
See Lacombe-Stettler electoral district from 1993-2004

== Election results ==
=== 1909 ===
1909 Alberta general election
Party	Candidate	Votes	%	±%
Liberal	Robert L. Shaw	873	71.27%	–
Conservative	J.K. Creighton	352	28.73%	–
Total		1,225	–	–
Rejected, spoiled and declined		N/A	–	–
Eligible electors / turnout		N/A	N/A	–
Liberal pickup new district.				
Source(s) Source: "Stettler Official Results 1909 Alberta general election". Alberta Heritage Community Foundation.

=== 1913 ===
1913 Alberta general election
Party	Candidate	Votes	%	±%
Liberal	Robert L. Shaw	928	45.65%	-25.62%
Conservative	George W. Morris	907	44.61%	15.88%
Independent	Malcolm McNeil	198	9.74%	–
Total		2,033	–	–
Rejected, spoiled and declined		N/A	–	–
Eligible electors / turnout		N/A	N/A	–
Liberal hold		Swing		-20.75%
Source(s) Source: "Stettler Official Results 1913 Alberta general election". Alberta Heritage Community Foundation.

=== 1917 ===
1917 Alberta general election
Party	Candidate	Votes	%	±%
Liberal	Edward H. Prudden	1,408	39.45%	-6.20%
Conservative	George W. Morris	1,375	38.53%	-6.09%
Independent	J. R. Knight	786	22.02%	12.28%
Total		3,569	–	–
Rejected, spoiled and declined		N/A	–	–
Eligible electors / turnout		N/A	N/A	–
Liberal hold		Swing		-0.05%
Source(s) Source: "Stettler Official Results 1917 Alberta general election". Alberta Heritage Community Foundation.

=== 1921 ===
1921 Alberta general election
Party	Candidate	Votes	%	±%
United Farmers	Albert L. Sanders	3,106	65.89%	–
Liberal	Edward H. Prudden	1,608	34.11%	-5.34%
Total		4,714	–	–
Rejected, spoiled and declined		N/A	–	–
Eligible electors / turnout		N/A	N/A	–
United Farmers gain from Liberal		Swing		15.43%
Source(s) Source: "Stettler Official Results 1921 Alberta general election". Alberta Heritage Community Foundation.

=== 1926 ===
1926 Alberta general election
Party	Candidate	Votes	%	±%
United Farmers	Albert L. Sanders	2,122	54.69%	-11.20%
Conservative	H. A. Blair	921	23.74%	–
Liberal	George Auxier	837	21.57%	-12.54%
Total		3,880	–	–
Rejected, spoiled and declined		192	–	–
Eligible electors / turnout		5,644	72.15%	–
United Farmers hold		Swing		-0.41%
Source(s) Source: "Stettler Official Results 1926 Alberta general election". Alberta Heritage Community Foundation.

=== 1930 ===
1930 Alberta general election
Party	Candidate	Votes	%	±%
United Farmers	Albert L. Sanders	1,934	50.34%	-4.35%
Conservative	H. A. Blair	1,147	29.85%	6.12%
Liberal	A. B. Clark	761	19.81%	-1.76%
Total		3,842	–	–
Rejected, spoiled and declined		220	–	–
Eligible electors / turnout		5,743	70.73%	-1.42%
United Farmers hold		Swing		-5.23%
Source(s) Source: "Stettler Official Results 1930 Alberta general election". Alberta Heritage Community Foundation.

=== 1935 ===
1935 Alberta general election
Party	Candidate	Votes	%	±%
Social Credit	Charles Cockroft	3,603	68.26%	–
Liberal	M. J. Brennan	882	16.71%	-3.10%
United Farmers	Albert L. Sanders	522	9.89%	-40.45%
Conservative	H. A. Blair	271	5.13%	-24.72%
Total		5,278	–	–
Rejected, spoiled and declined		114	–	–
Eligible electors / turnout		6,000	89.87%	19.14%
Social Credit gain from United Farmers		Swing		15.53%
Source(s) Source: "Stettler Official Results 1935 Alberta general election". Alberta Heritage Community Foundation.

=== 1940 ===
1940 Alberta general election
Party	Candidate	Votes	%	±%
Social Credit	Chester A. Reynolds	2,668	50.31%	-17.95%
Independent	L. V. Lohr	1,851	34.90%	–
Co-operative Commonwealth	H. H. Turner	784	14.78%	–
Total		5,303	–	–
Rejected, spoiled and declined		187	–	–
Eligible electors / turnout		6,994	78.50%	-11.37%
Social Credit hold		Swing		-18.07%
Source(s) Source: "Stettler Official Results 1940 Alberta general election". Alberta Heritage Community Foundation.

=== 1944 ===
1944 Alberta general election
Party	Candidate	Votes	%	±%
Social Credit	William S. Mackie	2,811	60.14%	9.83%
Co-operative Commonwealth	Arthur H. Rowe	1,103	23.60%	8.81%
Independent	Cornelius F. Pals	760	16.26%	-18.64%
Total		4,674	–	–
Rejected, spoiled and declined		92	–	–
Eligible electors / turnout		6,174	77.19%	-1.30%
Social Credit hold		Swing		10.57%
Source(s) Source: "Stettler Official Results 1944 Alberta general election". Alberta Heritage Community Foundation.

=== 1948 ===
1948 Alberta general election
Party	Candidate	Votes	%	±%
Social Credit	William S. Mackie	3,248	77.31%	17.17%
Co-operative Commonwealth	Joe J. Tipman	953	22.69%	-0.91%
Total		4,201	–	–
Rejected, spoiled and declined		330	–	–
Eligible electors / turnout		6,676	67.87%	-9.32%
Social Credit hold		Swing		9.04%
Source(s) Source: "Stettler Official Results 1948 Alberta general election". Alberta Heritage Community Foundation.

=== 1952 ===
1952 Alberta general election
Party	Candidate	Votes	%	±%.
First count
Social Credit	John Etter Clark	2,275	48.47%	-28.85%
Liberal	William V. McTaggart	1,225	26.10%	–
Co-operative Commonwealth	Morton H. Neilson	752	16.02%	-6.66%
Independent Social Credit	Norman E. Uttley	442	9.42%	–
Total		4,694	–	–
Ballot transfer results
Social Credit	John Etter Clark	2,397	53.03%	–
Liberal	William V. McTaggart	1,339	29.62%	–
Co-operative Commonwealth	Morton H. Neilson	784	17.35%	–
Total		4,520	–	–
Rejected, spoiled and declined		251	–	–
Eligible electors / turnout		7,100	69.65%	1.78%
Social Credit hold		Swing		-16.13%
Source(s) Source: "Stettler Official Results 1952 Alberta general election". Alberta Heritage Community Foundation.

=== 1955 ===
1955 Alberta general election
Party	Candidate	Votes	%	±%
Social Credit	John Etter Clark	2,892	56.25%	7.79%
Conservative	V. Richardson	1,523	29.62%	–
Co-operative Commonwealth	Morton H. Neilson	726	14.12%	-1.90%
Total		5,141	–	–
Rejected, spoiled and declined		252	–	–
Eligible electors / turnout		7,228	74.61%	4.96%
Social Credit hold		Swing		2.13%
Source(s) Source: "Stettler Official Results 1955 Alberta general election". Alberta Heritage Community Foundation.

=== 1959 ===
1959 Alberta general election
Party	Candidate	Votes	%	±%
Social Credit	Galen C. Norris	3,150	61.06%	4.80%
Progressive Conservative	Gordon Taylor	991	19.21%	–
Liberal	Henry Kroeger	721	13.98%	–
Co-operative Commonwealth	Alice Ness	297	5.76%	-8.36%
Total		5,159	–	–
Rejected, spoiled and declined		30	–	–
Eligible electors / turnout		7,297	71.11%	-3.50%
Social Credit hold		Swing		7.61%
Source(s) Source: "Stettler Official Results 1959 Alberta general election". Alberta Heritage Community Foundation.

=== 1963 ===
1963 Alberta general election
Party	Candidate	Votes	%	±%
Social Credit	Galen C. Norris	3,076	68.20%	7.15%
Liberal	Clark K. Burlingham	1,065	23.61%	9.64%
New Democratic	Joseph (Joe) Tipman	369	8.18%	–
Total		4,510	–	–
Rejected, spoiled and declined		12	–	–
Eligible electors / turnout		7,186	62.93%	-8.18%
Social Credit hold		Swing		1.37%
Source(s) Source: "Stettler Official Results 1963 Alberta general election". Alberta Heritage Community Foundation.

=== 1967 ===
1967 Alberta general election
Party	Candidate	Votes	%	±%
Social Credit	Galen C. Norris	2,659	55.92%	-12.28%
Progressive Conservative	Bob McKnight	1,461	30.73%	–
New Democratic	Morton H. Neilson	635	13.35%	5.17%
Total		4,755	–	–
Rejected, spoiled and declined		90	–	–
Eligible electors / turnout		6,881	70.41%	7.48%
Social Credit hold		Swing		-9.70%
Source(s) Source: "Stettler Official Results 1967 Alberta general election". Alberta Heritage Community Foundation.

=== 1971 ===
1971 Alberta general election
Party	Candidate	Votes	%	±%
Progressive Conservative	Jack G. Robertson	2,925	52.65%	21.92%
Social Credit	Galen C. Norris	2,631	47.35%	-8.57%
Total		5,556	–	–
Rejected, spoiled and declined		30	–	–
Eligible electors / turnout		7,172	77.89%	7.47%
Progressive Conservative gain from Social Credit		Swing		-9.95%
Source(s) Source: "Stettler Official Results 1971 Alberta general election". Alberta Heritage Community Foundation.

=== 1975 ===
1975 Alberta general election
Party	Candidate	Votes	%	±%
Progressive Conservative	Graham L. Harle	3,773	75.48%	22.83%
Social Credit	James Mah	866	17.32%	-30.03%
New Democratic	William Cook	360	7.20%	–
Total		4,999	–	–
Rejected, spoiled and declined		35	–	–
Eligible electors / turnout		7,357	68.42%	-9.46%
Progressive Conservative hold		Swing		26.43%
Source(s) Source: "Stettler Official Results 1975 Alberta general election". Alberta Heritage Community Foundation.

=== 1979 ===
1979 Alberta general election
Party	Candidate	Votes	%	±%
Progressive Conservative	Graham L. Harle	4,262	70.26%	-5.21%
Social Credit	David Thomas	1,191	19.63%	2.31%
New Democratic	Fred J. Rappel	503	8.29%	1.09%
Liberal	Douglas Cramer	110	1.81%	–
Total		6,066	–	–
Rejected, spoiled and declined		N/A	–	–
Eligible electors / turnout		8,738	69.42%	1.00%
Progressive Conservative hold		Swing		-3.76%
Source(s) Source: "Stettler Official Results 1979 Alberta general election". Alberta Heritage Community Foundation.

=== 1982 ===
1982 Alberta general election
Party	Candidate	Votes	%	±%
Progressive Conservative	Graham L. Harle	4,915	71.58%	1.32%
Western Canada Concept	Doug Carmichael	1,334	19.43%	–
New Democratic	Fred J. Rappel	617	8.99%	0.69%
Total		6,866	–	–
Rejected, spoiled and declined		18	–	–
Eligible electors / turnout		9,304	73.99%	4.57%
Progressive Conservative hold		Swing		0.76%
Source(s) Source: "Stettler Official Results 1982 Alberta general election". Alberta Heritage Community Foundation.

=== 1986 ===
1986 Alberta general election
Party	Candidate	Votes	%	±%
Progressive Conservative	Brian C. Downey	3,938	57.81%	-13.77%
Liberal	Red Peeples	1,508	22.14%	–
New Democratic	Fred J. Rappel	1,058	15.53%	6.55%
Western Canada Concept	Iris Bourne	308	4.52%	-14.91%
Total		6,812	–	–
Rejected, spoiled and declined		15	–	–
Eligible electors / turnout		11,888	57.43%	-16.56%
Progressive Conservative hold		Swing		-8.24%
Source(s) Source: "Stettler Official Results 1986 Alberta general election". Alberta Heritage Community Foundation.

=== 1989 ===
March 20, 1989

1989 Alberta general election
Party	Candidate	Votes	%	±%
Progressive Conservative	Brian C. Downey	3,875	57.88%	0.07%
Liberal	Frank Pickering	1,731	25.86%	3.72%
New Democratic	Fred J. Rappel	1,089	16.27%	0.73%
Total		6,695	–	–
Rejected, spoiled and declined		15	–	–
Eligible electors / turnout		11,345	59.14%	1.72%
Progressive Conservative hold		Swing		-1.82%
Source(s) Source: "Stettler Official Results 1989 Alberta general election". Alberta Heritage Community Foundation.

=== 1989 by-election ===
Alberta provincial by-election, May 9, 1989 following the resignation of Brian C. Downey on April 8, 1989
Party	Candidate	Votes	%
Progressive Conservative	Don Getty	5,558	71.36
Liberal	Frank Pickering	1,598	20.52
New Democratic	Grant Bergman	633	8.13
Total		7,789	–
Rejected, spoiled and declined		15	–
Eligible electors / turnout		11,618	67.17
Source(s) Source: "Stettler Official By-election Results". Elections Alberta. May 9, 1989.

== Plebiscite results ==
=== 1957 liquor plebiscite ===
1957 Alberta liquor plebiscite results: Stettler
Question A: Do you approve additional types of outlets for the sale of beer, wine and spirituous liquor subject to a local vote?
Ballot choice	Votes	%
No	1,785	50.28%
Yes	1,765	49.82%
Total votes	3,550	100%
Rejected, spoiled and declined	9	
6,743 eligible electors, turnout 52.78%

On October 30, 1957, a stand-alone plebiscite was held province wide in all 50 of the then current provincial electoral districts in Alberta. The government decided to consult Alberta voters to decide on liquor sales and mixed drinking after a divisive debate in the legislature. The plebiscite was intended to deal with the growing demand for reforming antiquated liquor control laws.

The plebiscite was conducted in two parts. Question A, asked in all districts, asked the voters if the sale of liquor should be expanded in Alberta, while Question B, asked in a handful of districts within the corporate limits of Calgary and Edmonton, asked if men and women should be allowed to drink together in establishments.

Province wide, Question A of the plebiscite passed in 33 of the 50 districts, while Question B passed in all five districts. Stettler barely voted against the proposal; the results were almost a tie. The voter turnout in the district was well above the province wide average of 46%.

Official district returns were released to the public on December 31, 1957. The Social Credit government in power at the time did not consider the results binding. However the results of the vote led the government to repeal all existing liquor legislation and introduce an entirely new Liquor Act.

Municipal districts lying inside electoral districts that voted against the plebiscite, such as Stettler, were designated Local Option Zones by the Alberta Liquor Control Board and considered effective dry zones. Business owners who wanted a licence had to petition for a binding municipal plebiscite in order for a licence to be granted.

== See also ==
- List of Alberta provincial electoral districts
- Canadian provincial electoral districts
