= Frederick Niddrie =

Canadian politician

Frederick James Niddrie

Member of the Legislative Assembly of Alberta
- In office November 16, 1950 – December 19, 1958
- Preceded by: Norman Cook
- Succeeded by: Roderick Macleod
- Constituency: Olds

Personal details
- Born: March 27, 1890 Winnipeg, Manitoba
- Died: December 19, 1958 (aged 68)
- Party: Social Credit
- Occupation: farmer and politician

Frederick James Arthur Niddrie (March 27, 1890 – December 19, 1958) was a farmer provincial level politician from Alberta, Canada. He served as a member of the Legislative Assembly of Alberta and sat with the governing Social Credit caucus representing the electoral district of Olds from 1950 until his death in 1958.

== Early life ==
Niddrie was born in Winnipeg, Manitoba, in 1889. His family moved to [Eagle Valley on the Big Red Deer River west of Olds, Alberta] when he was very young. He took his early schooling in Eagle Valley country school and later attended post secondary education at Alberta College in Edmonton.

== Political career ==
Niddrie ran for a seat to the Alberta Legislature in the by-election held on November 16, 1950. He defeated Liberal candidate M. Winther to hold the Olds electoral district for Social Credit.

Less than two years later, Niddrie ran for re-election in the 1952 Alberta general election. He faced a straight fight against Liberal candidate Edward Miller and won his second term easily. Niddrie was re-elected for his third and final term in the 1955 Alberta general election. His margin of victory dropped against Liberal candidate A. Boyce, but he still won easily.

Niddrie died on December 19, 1958, as a result of complications from a ruptured appendix that he had been hospitalized with approximately two weeks prior. He was buried in Olds, Alberta.
