= Archibald J. McLean =

Canadian cattleman & politician (1860–1933)

The Honourable Archibald J. McLean MLA
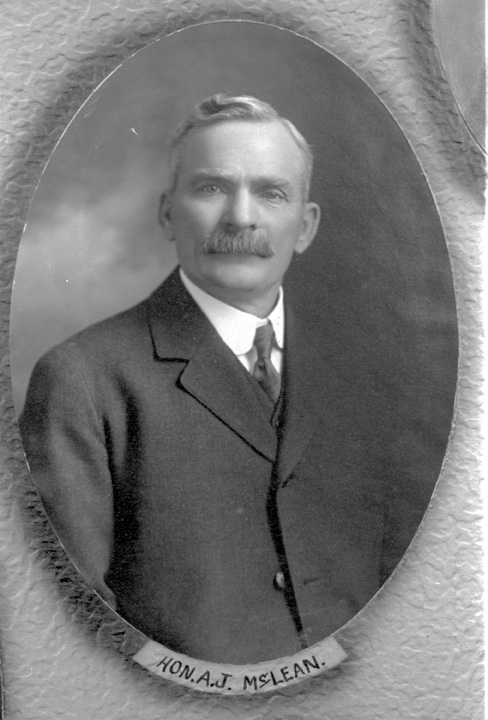
- McLean c. 1909 – c. 1913

5th Minister of Public Works of Alberta
- In office October 16, 1917 – August 21, 1921
- Preceded by: Charles Stewart
- Succeeded by: Alexander Ross

Minister of Municipal Affairs of Alberta
- In office December 20, 1911 – May 3, 1912
- Succeeded by: Charles Stewart

3rd Provincial Secretary of Alberta
- In office June 1, 1910 – October 15, 1917
- Preceded by: Duncan Marshall
- Succeeded by: Wilfrid Gariépy

Member of the Legislative Assembly of Alberta
- In office March 22, 1909 – July 17, 1921
- Preceded by: Riding created
- Succeeded by: Lawrence Peterson
- Constituency: Lethbridge District (1909–1913); Taber (1913–1921)

Personal details
- Born: Archibald James McLean; September 25, 1860 Aldborough, Canada West
- Died: October 13, 1933 (aged 73) Macleod, Alberta
- Resting place: Union Cemetery; 49.73103°N 113.3875°W
- Party: Liberal (1910-1921)
- Other political affiliations: Independent (1909-1910)

Archibald James McLean (September 25, 1860 – October 13, 1933) was a cattleman and politician from Ontario, Canada. He was one of the Big Four who helped found the Calgary Stampede in 1912.

== Biography ==
Archibald McLean was born September 25, 1860, in Aldborough, Canada West, to James McLean and Clementine McMurchy. His parents were both farmers. In 1881, McLean moved west to Virden, Manitoba (aged 21). While working, he learnt how to raise and handle livestock. About 5 years later, McLean moved further west to the District of Alberta (now a province) from to work as a ranch hand and foreman. His experience led him to a management position a year later at the CY Ranch of the Cypress Cattle Company, located near present-day Taber, Alberta. With his help, it turned into one of the largest growers of cattle for export. McLean later became the ranch's owner.

He married Margaret E. Duncan on December 15, 1904, in Hamilton, Ontario. Margaret died two years after giving birth to their only son.

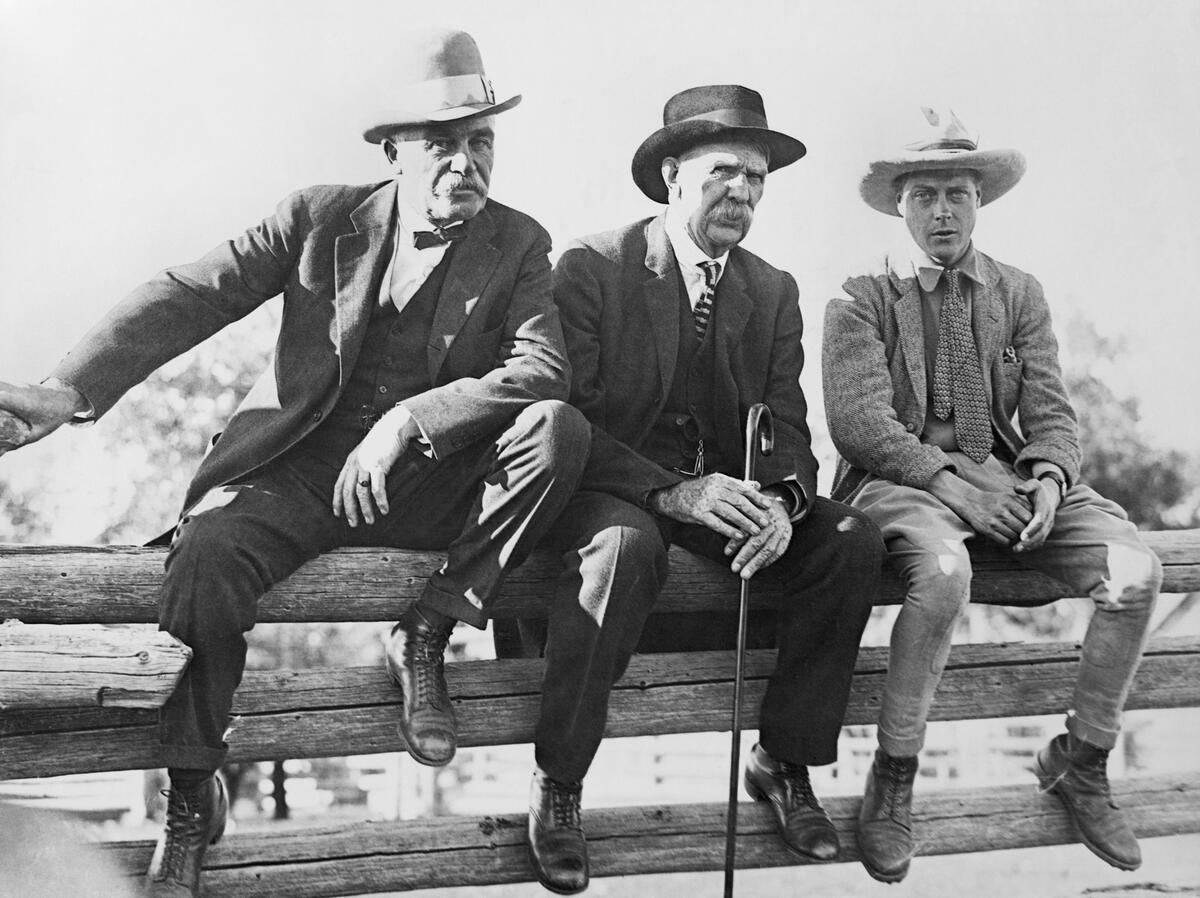
Edward, Prince of Wales, sitting on a corral fence with McLean and George Lane at the EP Ranch in October 1924.

McLean then established his own cattle company in London to facilitate the sale and export of cattle throughout the British Isles. He sold the company in 1905.

McLean was first elected as an Independent Liberal MLA for the Lethbridge constituency in the 1909 Alberta general election. His election to the legislature made him one of the first two independents elected in Alberta history, the other being Edward Michener. On June 1, 1910, he accepted an appointment by Premier Arthur Lewis Sifton to cross the floor to the government and join the cabinet to become the new Provincial Secretary. He was acclaimed in a ministerial by-election on June 22, 1910, and officially took over the position. He served as minister of municipal affairs, and as minister of public works.

McLean was re-elected to a second term, this time in the new Taber provincial electoral district in the 1913 Alberta general election. He defeated two other candidates in a landslide victory. McLean would be re-elected to his third and final term in the 1917 Alberta general election. The election was hotly contested but with Conservative candidate Thomas King providing a strong showing, but McLean still won with an 800-vote plurality. In the 1921 Alberta general election, he would run again attempting to win a fourth term in office and a fifth straight election but was defeated by candidate Lawrence Peterson from the United Farmers of Alberta in a tight race. After his loss, McLean left politics to return to ranching on the Piikani reserve.

Archibald McLean died October 13, 1933, in Macleod, Alberta. He was buried at the Union Cemetery in Macleod. McLean lived to the age of 73. His funeral had over 500 people in attendance, and the Fort Macleod Gazette described his memorial service as being "probably the largest funeral ever held in southern Alberta".

== Legacy ==
- The Big Four Building at the Stampede Grounds in Calgary, Alberta (opened 1959).
- A member of the Canadian Agricultural Hall of Fame located in Toronto, Ontario.
- McLean Bridge located north of Taber, Alberta.
- One of McLean's saddles is on display at the Fort Museum of the North-West Mounted Police as of January 2008.
