= Olds (provincial electoral district) =

Defunct provincial electoral district in Alberta, Canada

Coordinates: 51.79278°N 114.10667°W

Alberta electoral district

Defunct provincial electoral district
- Legislature: Legislative Assembly of Alberta
- District created: 1909
- District abolished: 1963
- First contested: 1909
- Last contested: 1959

Olds was a provincial electoral district in Alberta, Canada, mandated to return a single member to the Legislative Assembly of Alberta from 1909 to 1963. It was named after the town of Olds, Alberta.

In 1963, the district was combined with the Didsbury electoral district to form Olds-Didsbury.

== Olds history ==
Members of the Legislative Assembly for Olds
| Assembly | Years | Member | Party |
|---|---|---|---|
See Rosebud electoral districts from 1905-1909
| 2nd | 1909–1913 | Duncan Marshall | Liberal |
| 3rd | 1913–1917 | Duncan Marshall | Liberal |
| 4th | 1917–1921 | Duncan Marshall | Liberal |
| 5th | 1921–1926 | Nelson Smith | United Farmers |
| 6th | 1926–1930 | Nelson Smith | United Farmers |
| 7th | 1930–1935 | Frank Grisdale | United Farmers |
| 8th | 1935–1940 | Herbert Ash | Social Credit |
| 8th | 1940-1940 | Herbert Ash | Independent Social Credit |
| 9th | 1940–1944 | Norman Cook | Social Credit |
| 10th | 1944–1948 | Norman Cook | Social Credit |
| 11th | 1948–1950 | Norman Cook | Social Credit |
| 11th | 1950–1952 | Frederick Niddrie | Social Credit |
| 12th | 1952–1955 | Frederick Niddrie | Social Credit |
| 13th | 1955–1958 | Frederick Niddrie | Social Credit |
| 13th | 1959-1959 | Roderick Macleod | Social Credit |
| 14th | 1959–1963 | Roderick Macleod | Social Credit |
See Olds-Didsbury electoral district from 1963-1997

The electoral district of Olds was created and first contested for the 1909 Alberta general election. The electoral district included much of the area of the Rosebud electoral district contested in the 1905 election. The 1909 contest in Olds was a two-way fight, which was won by Liberal candidate Duncan Marshall. Marshall was appointed to the cabinet as Minister of Agriculture and Provincial Secretary shortly after the election.

Marshall was confirmed in a Ministerial by-election romping to an easy win over Socialist Candidate Samuel Welsh later that year. He lost his portfolios as the Alexander Rutherford government fell in 1910 due to the Alberta and Great Waterways Railway scandal. Premier Arthur Sifton re-appointed him to that post.

Marshall ran for re-election in the 1913 general election and nearly lost his seat but was successful. He won by a bigger majority in 1917. In the 1921 general election he was defeated by Nelson Smith, a candidate for the United Farmers of Alberta in a hotly contested race. The 1921 saw the United Farmers elected to a majority government.

From 1924 to 1956, the district used instant-runoff voting to elect its MLA.

Smith was re-elected in 1926. He did not run for re-election in 1930. He was replaced by Frank Grisdale, who held the seat for the United Farmers. Grisdale was appointed Minister of Agriculture in 1934 and served in that portfolio for one year. Social Credit swept to power in the 1935 general election. Most voters in Olds went to the SC. Social Credit candidate Herbert Ash easily defeated Grisdale.

Ash served a single term in office. He was removed from caucus by the Aberhart controlled Social Credit Advisory Board that nominated candidates and not allowed to run under the Social Credit banner for the 1940 Alberta general election. He became an Independent Social Credit candidate and ran anyway. In the 1940 general election, both Ash and Grisdale ran as independents. They were defeated by Social Credit candidate Norman Cook.

Cook held the district for three terms before dying in 1950. The Social Credit party fielded candidate Frederick Niddrie in a 1950 by-election who retained the seat for the SC party. Niddrie was re-elected in the 1952 and 1955 general elections before dying and vacating the seat in 1959.

In the third by-election held in the district, Social Credit fielded Roderick Macleod who retained the district for the SC party. He was elected for the second time in a year in the 1959 Alberta general election and kept the seat until the district was abolished in 1963, being rolled into the Olds-Didsbury district.

== Election results ==
=== 1909 ===
1909 Alberta general election
| Party | Candidate | Votes | % | ±% |
|---|---|---|---|---|
| Liberal | Duncan Marshall | 760 | 64.63% | – |
| Conservative | George McDonald | 416 | 35.37% | – |
| Total | | 1,176 | – | – |
| Rejected, spoiled and declined | | N/A | – | – |
| Eligible electors / turnout | | 1,668 | 70.50% | – |
| Liberal pickup new district. | | | | |
Source(s) Source: "Olds Official Results 1909 Alberta general election". Alberta Heritage Community Foundation.

=== 1909 by-election ===
Alberta provincial by-election, November 23, 1909 Upon Duncan Marshall's appointment as Minister of Agriculture
| Party | Candidate | Votes | % | ±% |
|---|---|---|---|---|
| Liberal | Duncan Marshall | 733 | 86.75% | 22.12% |
| Socialist | Samuel W. Welch | 112 | 13.25% | – |
| Total | | 845 | – | – |
| Rejected, spoiled and declined | | N/A | – | – |
| Eligible electors / turnout | | 1,668 | 50.96 | – |
| Liberal hold | | Swing | | 22.12% |
Source(s) "By-elections". Elections Alberta.

Duncan Marshall having just been elected to the Legislature was appointed to the cabinet as Minister of Agriculture and Provincial Secretary by Premier Alexander Rutherford. Under election laws in force at the time, a ministerial confirmation by-election had to be called. Marshall was the only new appointment to the Rutherford cabinet after the 1909 general election.

Marshall was unanimously confirmed as the Liberal candidate for the by-election and his portfolio endorsed by the membership at a nomination meeting attended by over 100 delegates on November 3, 1909. Speakers at the meeting included federal MP Michael Clark and Senator Peter Talbot.

The Conservatives decided not to oppose Duncan Marshall, but the Socialist Party led by Charles O'Brien, who had just won their first seat in the 1909 general election decided to run a candidate in Olds to oppose Marshall. O'Brien personally managed and ran the campaign of candidate Samuel Welsh.

The Socialists campaigned primarily a platform of nationalizing all farms to be controlled by the state. They also promoted abolishing wages and private property. The Socialists termed their campaign and supporters as "The Red Revolutionaries".

On election day, the riding saw a significant reduction in voter turnout with a light vote being polled compared to the 1909 general election. Marshall was re-elected with a landslide super majority taking almost 87% of the vote to keep his seat and ministerial post.

=== 1913 ===
1913 Alberta general election
| Party | Candidate | Votes | % | ±% |
|---|---|---|---|---|
| Liberal | Duncan Marshall | 709 | 51.94% | -12.68% |
| Conservative | George H. Cloakey | 656 | 48.06% | 12.68% |
| Total | | 1,365 | – | – |
| Rejected, spoiled and declined | | N/A | – | – |
| Eligible electors / turnout | | N/A | N/A | N/A |
| Liberal hold | | Swing | | -8.28% |
Source(s) Source: "Olds Official Results 1913 Alberta general election". Alberta Heritage Community Foundation. 1,695 eligible electors however 2 pollings districts were not counted.

=== 1917 ===
1917 Alberta general election
| Party | Candidate | Votes | % | ±% |
|---|---|---|---|---|
| Liberal | Duncan Marshall | 1,283 | 56.35% | 4.40% |
| Conservative | George H. Cloakey | 994 | 43.65% | -4.40% |
| Total | | 2,277 | – | – |
| Rejected, spoiled and declined | | N/A | – | – |
| Eligible electors / turnout | | N/A | N/A | N/A |
| Liberal hold | | Swing | | 4.40% |
Source(s) Source: "Olds Official Results 1917 Alberta general election". Alberta Heritage Community Foundation. There were 2,667 eligible electors, however 6 polling districts were not counted.

=== 1921 ===
1921 Alberta general election
| Party | Candidate | Votes | % | ±% |
|---|---|---|---|---|
| United Farmers | Nelson S. Smith | 1,896 | 60.50% | – |
| Liberal | Duncan Marshall | 1,238 | 39.50% | -16.84% |
| Total | | 3,134 | – | – |
| Rejected, spoiled and declined | | N/A | – | – |
| Eligible electors / turnout | | N/A | N/A | N/A |
| United Farmers gain from Liberal | | Swing | | 4.15% |
Source(s) Source: "Olds Official Results 1921 Alberta general election". Alberta Heritage Community Foundation.

=== 1926 ===
1926 Alberta general election
| Party | Candidate | Votes | % | ±% |
|---|---|---|---|---|
| United Farmers | Nelson S. Smith | 1,613 | 59.96% | -0.53% |
| Liberal | Norman E. Cook | 708 | 26.32% | -13.18% |
| Conservative | L. H. Walkey | 369 | 13.72% | – |
| Total | | 2,690 | – | – |
| Rejected, spoiled and declined | | 152 | – | – |
| Eligible electors / turnout | | 4,044 | 70.28% | N/A |
| United Farmers hold | | Swing | | 6.32% |
Source(s) Source: "Olds Official Results 1926 Alberta general election". Alberta Heritage Community Foundation.

=== 1930 ===
1930 Alberta general election
| Party | Candidate | Votes | % | ±% |
|---|---|---|---|---|
| United Farmers | Frank S. Grisdale | 1,790 | 53.16% | -6.80% |
| Liberal | George Clark | 1,577 | 46.84% | 20.52% |
| Total | | 3,367 | – | – |
| Rejected, spoiled and declined | | 106 | – | – |
| Eligible electors / turnout | | 4,678 | 74.24% | 3.96% |
| United Farmers hold | | Swing | | -13.66% |
Source(s) Source: "Olds Official Results 1930 Alberta general election". Alberta Heritage Community Foundation.

=== 1935 ===
1935 Alberta general election
| Party | Candidate | Votes | % | ±% |
|---|---|---|---|---|
| Social Credit | Herbert J. Ash | 3,538 | 66.08% | – |
| Liberal | A. H. Mann | 955 | 17.84% | -29.00% |
| United Farmers | Frank S. Grisdale | 694 | 12.96% | -40.20% |
| Conservative | Wm. H. A. Thomas | 167 | 3.12% | – |
| Total | | 5,354 | – | – |
| Rejected, spoiled and declined | | 138 | – | – |
| Eligible electors / turnout | | 5,993 | 91.64% | 17.40% |
| Social Credit gain from United Farmers | | Swing | | 20.96% |
Source(s) Source: "Olds Official Results 1935 Alberta general election". Alberta Heritage Community Foundation.

=== 1940 ===
1940 Alberta general election
| Party | Candidate | Votes | % | ±% |
|---|---|---|---|---|
First count
| Social Credit | Norman E. Cook | 2,345 | 45.43% | -18.65% |
| Independent | Frank S. Grisdale | 2,455 | 47.56% | – |
| Independent Social Credit | Herbert J. Ash | 362 | 7.01% | – |
| Total | | 5,162 | – | – |
Ballot transfer results
| Independent | Frank S. Grisdale | 2,549 | 50.66% | – |
| Social Credit | Norman E. Cook | 2,483 | 40.34% | – |
| Total | | 5,032 | – | – |
| Rejected, spoiled and declined | | 186 | – | – |
| Eligible electors / turnout | | 7,002 | 76.38% | -15.26% |
| Social Credit hold | | Swing | | N/A |
Source(s) Source: "Olds Official Results 1940 Alberta general election". Alberta Heritage Community Foundation.

=== 1944 ===
1944 Alberta general election
| Party | Candidate | Votes | % | ±% |
|---|---|---|---|---|
| Social Credit | Norman E. Cook | 3,196 | 66.53% | 21.10% |
| Independent | Mrs. Ruple Ferguson | 832 | 17.32% | – |
| Co-operative Commonwealth | Grand P. Field | 776 | 16.15% | – |
| Total | | 4,804 | – | – |
| Rejected, spoiled and declined | | 51 | – | – |
| Eligible electors / turnout | | 5,377 | 90.29% | 13.91% |
| Social Credit hold | | Swing | | 24.82% |
Source(s) Source: "Olds Official Results 1944 Alberta general election". Alberta Heritage Community Foundation.

=== 1948 ===
1948 Alberta general election
| Party | Candidate | Votes | % | ±% |
|---|---|---|---|---|
| Social Credit | Norman E. Cook | 3,260 | 74.53% | 8.00% |
| Liberal | Robert A. Brownell | 690 | 15.78% | – |
| Co-operative Commonwealth | Charles A. Coutts | 424 | 9.69% | -6.46% |
| Total | | 4,374 | – | – |
| Rejected, spoiled and declined | | 421 | – | – |
| Eligible electors / turnout | | 7,175 | 66.83% | -23.46% |
| Social Credit hold | | Swing | | 4.77% |
Source(s) Source: "Olds Official Results 1948 Alberta general election". Alberta Heritage Community Foundation.

=== 1950 by-election ===
Alberta provincial by-election, November 16, 1950 following the death of Norman E. Cook on August 5, 1950
| Party | Candidate | Votes | % | ±% |
|---|---|---|---|---|
| Social Credit | Frederick J. Niddrie | 2,132 | 59.19% | -16.34% |
| Liberal | M. Winther | 1,470 | 40.81% | 25.03% |
| Total | | 3,602 | – | – |
| Rejected, spoiled and declined | | N/A | – | – |
| Eligible electors / turnout | | 7,175 | 50.20% | -16.63 |
| Social Credit hold | | Swing | | -20.69% |
Source(s) Source: "Olds Official By-election Results". Elections Alberta. November 16, 1950.

=== 1952 ===
1952 Alberta general election
| Party | Candidate | Votes | % | ±% |
|---|---|---|---|---|
| Social Credit | Frederick J. Niddrie | 3,064 | 65.54% | -8.99% |
| Liberal | Edward G. Miller | 1,611 | 34.46% | 18.68% |
| Total | | 4,675 | – | – |
| Rejected, spoiled and declined | | 195 | – | – |
| Eligible electors / turnout | | 7,316 | 66.57% | -0.26% |
| Social Credit hold | | Swing | | -13.84% |
Source(s) Source: "Olds Official Results 1952 Alberta general election". Alberta Heritage Community Foundation.

=== 1955 ===
1955 Alberta general election
| Party | Candidate | Votes | % | ±% |
|---|---|---|---|---|
| Social Credit | Frederick J. Niddrie | 3,161 | 58.55% | -6.99% |
| Liberal | A. Boyce | 2,238 | 41.45% | 6.99% |
| Total | | 5,399 | – | – |
| Rejected, spoiled and declined | | 211 | – | – |
| Eligible electors / turnout | | 7,515 | 74.65% | 8.08% |
| Social Credit hold | | Swing | | -6.99% |
Source(s) Source: "Olds Official Results 1955 Alberta general election". Alberta Heritage Community Foundation.

=== 1959 by-election ===
Alberta provincial by-election, February 9, 1959 following the death of Frederick J. Niddrie on December 19, 1958
| Party | Candidate | Votes | % | ±% |
|---|---|---|---|---|
| Social Credit | Roderick Angus Macleod | 3,183 | 67.35% | 8.80% |
| Liberal | W. Anderson | 1,543 | 32.65% | -8.80% |
| Total | | 4,726 | – | – |
| Rejected, spoiled and declined | | N/A | – | – |
| Eligible electors / turnout | | 7,515 | 62.89% | – |
| Social Credit hold | | Swing | | 8.80% |
Source(s) Source: "Olds Official By-election Results". Elections Alberta. February 9, 1959.

=== 1959 ===
1959 Alberta general election
| Party | Candidate | Votes | % | ±% |
|---|---|---|---|---|
| Social Credit | Roderick Angus Macleod | 3,424 | 66.46% | 7.91% |
| Progressive Conservative | Bruce Hanson | 1,728 | 33.54% | – |
| Total | | 5,152 | – | – |
| Rejected, spoiled and declined | | 13 | – | – |
| Eligible electors / turnout | | 6,939 | 74.43% | -0.22% |
| Social Credit hold | | Swing | | 7.91% |
Source(s) Source: "Olds Official Results 1959 Alberta general election". Alberta Heritage Community Foundation.

== Plebiscite results ==
=== 1957 liquor plebiscite ===
1957 Alberta liquor plebiscite results: Olds
Question A: Do you approve additional types of outlets for the sale of beer, wine and spirituous liquor subject to a local vote?
| Ballot choice | Votes | % |
| No | 3,044 | 61.76% |
| Yes | 1,164 | 38.24% |
| Total votes | 3,044 | 100% |
| Rejected, spoiled and declined | 32 | |
7,332 eligible electors, turnout 41.95%

On October 30, 1957, a stand-alone plebiscite was held province wide in all 50 of the then current provincial electoral districts in Alberta. The government decided to consult Alberta voters to decide on liquor sales and mixed drinking after a divisive debate in the Legislature. The plebiscite was intended to deal with the growing demand for reforming antiquated liquor control laws.

The plebiscite was conducted in two parts. Question A asked in all districts, asked the voters if the sale of liquor should be expanded in Alberta, while Question B asked in a handful of districts within the corporate limits of Calgary and Edmonton asked if men and women were allowed to drink together in establishments.

Province wide Question A of the plebiscite passed in 33 of the 50 districts while Question B passed in all five districts. Olds voted against the proposal by a wide margin. The voter turnout in the district was well below the province wide average of 46%.

Official district returns were released to the public on December 31, 1957. The Social Credit government in power at the time did not considered the results binding. However the results of the vote led the government to repeal all existing liquor legislation and introduce an entirely new Liquor Act.

Municipal districts lying inside electoral districts that voted against the Plebiscite such as Olds were designated Local Option Zones by the Alberta Liquor Control Board and considered effective dry zones, business owners that wanted a licence had to petition for a binding municipal plebiscite in order to be granted a licence.

== Historical boundaries and maps ==
Olds 1909 boundaries
Bordering districts
| North | East | West | South |
|---|---|---|---|
| Innisfail | Stettler | None | Cochrane, Didsbury, Rocky Mountain |
Legal description from the Statutes of Alberta 1909, An Act respecting the Legislative Assembly of Alberta.
| riding map goes here | | map in relation to other districts in rural Alberta goes here | |
Olds.—Commencing at the intersection of the Red Deer River with the northerly limit of township 34, range 21, west of the 4th meridian; thence west along the northerly limit of the 34th townships to the western boundary of the Province of Alberta; thence in a southerly direction along the said west boundary of the Province of Alberta to the northerly boundary of the 31st township; thence east along the northerly boundary of the said 31st townships to the intersection with the Red Deer River in the 6th range, west of the 5th meridian; thence following the Red Deer River down stream to the north boundary of township 32, range 5, west of the 5th meridian; thence east along the north boundary of the 32nd townships to the north-east corner of township 32, range 3m west of the 5th meridian; thence south along the east boundary of township 32, range 3, west of the 5th meridian to the north-east corner of township 31, range 3, west of the 5th meridian; thence east along the north boundary of the 31st townships to the Red Deer River in the 21st range, west of the 4th meridian; thence northerly up stream along the said Red Deer River to the point of commencement.
Note: Boundaries came into force in 1909.

Olds 1913 boundaries
Bordering districts
| North | East | West | South |
|---|---|---|---|
| Innisfail | Hand Hills, Stettler | Edson, Rocky Mountain | Cochrane, Didsbury, |
Legal description from the Statutes of Alberta 1913, An Act to Amend the Act respecting the Legislative Assembly of Alberta.
| riding map goes here | | map in relation to other districts in rural Alberta goes here | |
Olds.—Commencing at the intersection of the Red Deer River with the north limit of township 34, range 21, west of the 4th meridian; thence west along the north boundary of the 34th townships to the north-east corner of township 34, range 8 west of the 5th meridian; thence south along the meridian line between ranges 7 and 8, west of the 5th meridian to the north-east corner of township 31, range 8, west of the 5th meridian; thence east along the north boundary of the 31st townships to the intersection with the Red Deer River in range 6, west of the 5th meridian; thence following the Red Deer River downstream to the north boundary of township 32, range 5, west of the 5th meridian; thence east along the north boundary of the 32nd townships to the north-east corner of township 32, range 3, west of the 5th meridian; thence south along the east boundary of township 32, range 3, west of the 5th meridian to the north-east corner of township 31, range 3, west of the 5th meridian; thence east along the north boundary of the 31st townships to the Red Deer River in range 21, west of the 4th meridian; thence north up stream along said Red Deer River to the point of commencement.
Note: Boundaries came into force in 1913 and remained unchanged until 1930.

Olds 1930 boundaries
Bordering districts
| North | East | West | South |
|---|---|---|---|
| Innisfail | Hand Hills, Stettler | Edson, Rocky Mountain | Cochrane, Didsbury, |
Legal description from the Statutes of Alberta 1930, An Act to Amend the Act respecting the Legislative Assembly of Alberta.
| riding map goes here | | map in relation to other districts in rural Alberta goes here | |
Olds.—Commencing at the intersection of the Red Deer River with the north boundary of township 34, in range 21, west of the 4th meridian; thence west along the said north boundary of township 34, in range 31, west of the 4th meridian, to the meridian line between ranges 7 and 8, west of the 5th meridian to the north boundary of township 31; thence east along the said north boundary of townships 31 to the intersection with the Red Deer River in range 21, west of the 4th meridian; thence northerly up stream along the said Red Deer River to the point of commencement.
Note: Boundaries came into force in 1930.

Olds 1939 boundaries
Bordering districts
| North | East | West | South |
|---|---|---|---|
| Red Deer, Rocky Mountain House | Hand Hills, Stettler | Banff-Cochrane, Rocky Mountain House | Didsbury, |
Legal description from the Statutes of Alberta 1939, An Act to Amend The Legislative Assembly of Alberta.
| riding map goes here | | map in relation to other districts in rural Alberta goes here | |
"Electoral Division of Olds, the boundary whereof is as follows: Commencing at the north-east corner of township 34, range 9, west of the 5th meridian; thence east along the north boundary of township 34, ranges 8 to 1 inclusive, west of the 5th meridian and ranges 29 to 21 inclusive, west of the 4th meridian to the intersection with Red Deer River; thence in a generally southerly direction downstream along the Red Deer River to the intersection with the north boundary of township 31, range 21, west of the 4th meridian; thence west along the north boundary of township 31, ranges 21 to 29, west of the 4th meridian and ranges 1 to 8, inclusive, west of the 5th meridian to the north-east corner of township 31, range 9, west of the 5th meridian; thence north along the meridian between ranges 8 and 9, west of the 5th meridian, to the point of commencement.
Note: Boundaries came into force in 1940.

Olds 1950 boundaries
Bordering districts
| North | East | West | South |
|---|---|---|---|
| Red Deer, Rocky Mountain House | Hand Hills, Stettler | Rocky Mountain House | Didsbury, Drumheller |
Legal description from the Statutes of Alberta 1950, An Act to amend The Legislative Assembly Act.
| riding map goes here | | map in relation to other districts in rural Alberta goes here | |
"Electoral Division of Olds, the boundary whereof is as follows: Commencing at the north-east corner of township 34, range 9, west of the 5th meridian; thence southerly along the meridian between ranges 8 and 9 to the north-east corner of township 31, range 9, west of the 5th meridian; thence easterly along the north boundary of township 31, ranges 8 to 1 inclusive, west of the 5th meridian to an intersection with the left bank of the Red Deer River; thence in a generally northerly direction along the said left bank to its intersection with the north boundary of township 34, range 21, west of the 4th meridian; thence westerly along the north boundary of township 34, ranges 21 to 29 inclusive, west of the 4th meridian and ranges 1 to 8 inclusive, west of the 5th meridian to the point of commencement.
Note: Boundaries came into force in 1952.

Olds 1955 boundaries
Bordering districts
| North | East | West | South |
|---|---|---|---|
| Red Deer, Rocky Mountain House | Hand Hills, Stettler | Rocky Mountain House | Didsbury, Drumheller |
Legal description from the Statutes of Alberta 1955, An Act to amend The Legislative Assembly Act.
| riding map goes here | | map in relation to other districts in rural Alberta goes here | |
Note: Boundaries description remained unchanged from 1950.

== See also ==
- List of Alberta provincial electoral districts
- Canadian provincial electoral districts
