= 6th Alberta Legislature =

Canadian Legislative Assembly

- Majority parliament
- Feb. 10, 1927 – May. 10, 1930

Parliament leaders
- Premier: John Edward Brownlee; November 23, 1925 – July 10, 1934
- Cabinet: Brownlee cabinet

Party caucuses
- Government: United Farmers of Alberta
- Opposition: Liberal Party
- Crossbench: Dominion Labor Party
- Conservative Party

Legislative Assembly
- Speaker of the Assembly: George Norman Johnston; February 10, 1927 – July 22, 1935
- Members: 60 MLA seats

Sovereign
- Monarch: George V May 6, 1910 – January 20, 1936
- Lieutenant governor: Hon. William Egbert; October 29, 1925 – May 5, 1931

Sessions
- 1st session February 10, 1927 – April 2, 1927
- 2nd session February 2, 1928 – March 21, 1928
- 3rd session January 31, 1929 – March 20, 1929
- 4th session January 30, 1930 – April 3, 1930
← 5th	→ 7th

The 6th Alberta Legislative Assembly was in session from February 10, 1927, to May 10, 1930, with the membership of the assembly determined by the results of the 1926 Alberta general election held on June 28, 1926. The Legislature officially resumed on February 10, 1927, and continued until the fourth session was prorogued on April 3, 1930, and dissolved on May 10, 1930, prior to the 1930 Alberta general election.

Alberta's sixth government was controlled by the majority United Farmers of Alberta for the second time, led by Premier John Edward Brownlee. There was no Official Opposition in Alberta between 1926 and 1941 due to the Independent Movement which saw a majority of non-UFA candidates elected as independents. The Speaker was George Norman Johnston.

The 1926 Alberta general election formed the first legislature that was elected under Single Transferable Vote.

== Bills ==
=== Sexual Sterilization Act ===
The Sexual Sterilization Act was an act passed by the Alberta Legislature in 1928. The Act, ostensibly drafted to "protect the gene pool", allowed for sterilization of mentally disabled persons in order to prevent the transmission of traits to offspring deemed undesirable, the act also created the Alberta Eugenics Board.

At that time, eugenicists argued that mental illness, mental retardation, epilepsy, alcoholism, pauperism, certain criminal behaviours, and social defects, such as prostitution and sexual perversion, were genetically determined and inherited. Further, it was widely believed that persons with these disorders had a higher reproduction rate than the normal population. As a result, it was feared the gene pool in the general population was weakening.

During the time the Sexual Sterilization Act was in effect, 4,800 cases were proposed for sterilization in the province of Alberta, of which 99% received approval. Examination of sterilization records demonstrates that legislation did not apply equally to all members of society. Specifically, the Act was disproportionately applied to those in socially vulnerable positions, including females, children, unemployed persons, domestics, rural citizens, unmarried, institutionalized persons, Roman and Greek Catholics, and persons of Ukrainian, Native and Métis ethnicity.

The Act was repealed in 1972.

=== Alberta Natural Resources Act ===
The Alberta Natural Resources Act was an act passed by the Alberta Legislature in the fifth session in 1930. The Act facilitated the transfer from the Parliament of Canada and to the province of Alberta control over crown lands and natural resources within these provinces from the federal government to the provincial governments. Alberta through the Alberta Act had not been given control over their natural resources when they entered Confederation, unlike the other Canadian provinces.

The Alberta Natural Resource Transfer Agreement restricts the inherent hunting and fishing rights for indigenous peoples. “The Natural Resource Transfer Agreements with the three Western Provinces provide that laws respecting game in the province shall apply to Indians within the boundaries of the province”.

== Membership in the 6th Alberta Legislature ==
District	Member	Party	First elected/ previously elected	No.# of term(s)
Acadia	Lorne Proudfoot	United Farmers	1921	2nd term
Alexandra	Peter Enzenauer	United Farmers	1921	2nd term
Athabasca	John Frame	Liberal	1926	1st term
Athabasca	John Frame	United Farmers	1926	1st term
Beaver River	John Delisle	United Farmers	1926	1st term
Bow Valley	Joseph Shaw	Liberal	1926	1st term
Calgary	Alexander McGillivray	Conservative	1926	1st term
Calgary	George Harry Webster	Liberal	1926	1st term
Calgary	John Irwin	Conservative	1926	1st term
Calgary	Fred J. White	Dominion Labor	1921	2nd term
Calgary	Robert Parkyn	Independent Labor	1926	1st term
Camrose	Vernor Smith	United Farmers	1921	2nd term
Cardston	George Stringam	United Farmers	1921	2nd term
Claresholm	Gordon Walker	United Farmers	1926	1st term
Cochrane	Robert McCool	United Farmers	1926	1st term
Coronation	George Johnston	United Farmers	1921	2nd term
Cypress	Perren Baker	United Farmers	1921	2nd term
Didsbury	Austin Claypool	United Farmers	1921	2nd term
Edmonton	John Lymburn	United Farmers	1926	1st term
Edmonton	Charles Weaver	Conservative	1926	1st term
Edmonton	Charles Gibbs	Dominion Labor	1926	1st term
Edmonton	Warren Prevey	Liberal	1926	1st term
Edmonton	David Milwyn Duggan	Conservative	1926	1st term
Edson	Christopher Pattinson	Dominion Labor	1926	1st term
Empress	William Smith	United Farmers	1921	2nd term
Gleichen	John Buckley	United Farmers	1921	2nd term
Grouard	Leonidas Giroux	Liberal	1924	2nd term
Hand Hills	Gordon Forster	United Farmers	1921	2nd term
High River	Samuel Brown	United Farmers	1921	2nd term
Innisfail	Donald Cameron	United Farmers	1921	2nd term
Lac Ste. Anne	Charles McKeen	United Farmers	1921	2nd term
Lacombe	Irene Parlby	United Farmers	1921	2nd term
Leduc	Douglas Breton	United Farmers	1926	1st term
Lethbridge	Andrew Smeaton	Dominion Labor	1926	1st term
Little Bow	Oran McPherson	United Farmers	1921	2nd term
Macleod	William Shield	United Farmers	1921	2nd term
Medicine Hat	Charles Pingle	Liberal	1913, (Note: Redcliff) 1925	4th term*
Medicine Hat	Hector Lang (1928)	United Farmers	1928	1st term
Nanton	Daniel Harcourt Galbraith	United Farmers	1921	2nd term
Okotoks	George Hoadley	United Farmers	1909 (Note: First elected as Conservative)	5th term
Olds	Nelson Smith	United Farmers	1921	2nd term
Peace River	Hugh Allen	United Farmers	1926	1st term
Pembina	George MacLachlan	United Farmers	1921	2nd term
Pincher Creek	Earle Cook	United Farmers	1921	2nd term
Ponoka	John Brownlee	United Farmers	1921	2nd term
Red Deer	George Wilbert Smith	United Farmers	1921	2nd term
Ribstone	William Farquharson	United Farmers	1922	2nd term
Rocky Mountain	Philip Christophers	Dominion Labor	1921	2nd term
Sedgewick	Albert Andrews	United Farmers	1922	2nd term
St. Albert	Lucien Boudreau	Liberal	1913, 1926	4th term
St. Paul	Laudas Joly	United Farmers	1921	2nd term
Stettler	Albert Sanders	United Farmers	1921	2nd term
Stony Plain	Willard Washburn	United Farmers	1921	2nd term
Sturgeon	Samuel Carson	United Farmers	1921	2nd term
Taber	Lawrence Peterson	United Farmers	1921	2nd term
Vegreville	Archie Matheson	United Farmers	1921	2nd term
Vermilion	Richard Reid	United Farmers	1921	2nd term
Victoria	Rudolph Hennig	United Farmers	1926	1st term
Wainwright	John Russell Love	United Farmers	1921	2nd term
Warner	Maurice Conner	United Farmers	1921	2nd term
Wetaskiwin	Evert Sparks	United Farmers	1921	2nd term
Whitford	George Mihalcheon	United Farmers	1922	2nd term

=== Composition changes during the 6th Assembly ===
Number of members per party by date	1926	1928		1930
Number of members per party by date	Jun 28	Jan 10	May 1	?
United Farmers	43			44
Liberal	7	6	7	6
Dominion Labor	5			
Conservative	4			
Independent Labor	1			
Total members	60	59	60	
Vacant	0	1	0	
Government Majority	26	27	26	28

Membership changes during the 6th Assembly
Date	Name	District	Party	Reason
June 28, 1926	See List of Members			Election day of the sixth Alberta general election
January 10, 1928	Charles Pingle	Medicine Hat	Liberal	Died of a stroke
May 1, 1928	Hector Lang	Medicine Hat	Liberal	Elected in a by-election
1930	John Frame	Athabasca	United Farmers	Crossed the floor from the Liberals to the United Farmers caucus
