= 3rd Alberta Legislature =

Canadian Legislative Assembly

- Majority parliament
- Sep. 16, 1913 – Apr. 5, 1917

Parliament leaders
- Premier: Arthur Sifton; May 26, 1910 – October 30, 1917
- Cabinet: Sifton cabinet
- Leader of the Opposition: Edward Michener; November 10, 1910 – April 5, 1917

Party caucuses
- Government: Liberal Party
- Opposition: Conservative Party

Legislative Assembly
- Speaker of the Assembly: Charles W. Fisher; March 15, 1906 – May 15, 1919
- Members: 56 MLA seats

Sovereign
- Monarch: George V May 6, 1910 – January 20, 1936
- Lieutenant Governor: Hon. George Hedley Vicars Bulyea; September 1, 1905 – October 20, 1915
- Hon. Robert George Brett; October 20, 1915 – October 29, 1925

Sessions
- 1st session September 16, 1913 – October 25, 1913
- 2nd session October 7, 1914 – October 22, 1914
- 3rd session February 25, 1915 – April 17, 1915
- 4th session February 24, 1916 – April 19, 1916
- 5th session February 6, 1917 – April 5, 1917
← 2nd	→ 4th

The 3rd Alberta Legislative Assembly was in session from September 16, 1913, to April 5, 1917, with the membership of the assembly determined by the results of the 1913 Alberta general election held on April 17, 1913. The Legislature officially resumed on September 16, 1913, and continued until the fifth session was prorogued on April 17, 1917 and dissolved on May 14, 1917, prior to the 1917 Alberta general election.

Alberta's second government was controlled by the majority Liberal Party led by Premier Arthur Sifton. The Official Opposition was the Conservative Party led by Edward Michener. The Speaker was Charles W. Fisher who continued in the role from the 1st and 2nd assembly, and would serve in the role until his death from the 1918 flu pandemic in 1919.

The total number of seats in the assembly was increased from 41 contested in the 1913 election to 56.

The standings changed little during the 3rd legislature only 4 by-elections 3 of which resulted in the return of new members and no floor crossings occurred.

== Bills ==
During the fifth sitting of the 3rd Legislature, the Assembly would pass An Act amending The Election Act respecting Members of the Legislative Assembly on Active Service (Bill 58) which acclaimed members of the assembly in the 1917 election who were serving in armed forces during the First World War. The Act listed eleven members of the assembly and provided those members were deemed nominated and elected as a member of the 4th Alberta Legislature. The bill was assented to on April 5, 1917.

== Sitting dates ==
- 1st session September 16, 1913 - October 25, 1913
- 2nd session October 7, 1914 - October 22, 1914
- 3rd session February 25, 1915 - April 17, 1915
- 4th session February 24, 1916 - April 19, 1916
- 5th session February 6, 1917 - April 5, 1917

== Members election in the 1913 general election ==
=== Members ===
District	Member	Party	First elected / previously elected	No.# of term(s)	Portfolio	Notes
Acadia	John McColl	Liberal	1913	1st term		
Alexandra	James R. Lowery	Conservative	1913	1st term		
Athabasca	Alexander Grant MacKay	Liberal	1913	1st term		
Beaver River	Wilfrid Gariépy	Liberal	1913	1st term	Minister of Municipal Affairs	Elected in a by-election December 15, 1913; Appointed Minister of Municipal Affairs November 28, 1913
Bow Valley	George Lane	Liberal	1913	1st term		
Bow Valley	Charles R. Mitchell	Liberal	1910, (Note: Medicine Hat) 1913	2nd term*	Minister of Public Works; Provincial Treasurer	Elected in a by-election June 12, 1913; Appointed Provincial Treasurer November 28, 1913
Camrose	George P. Smith	Liberal	1909	2nd term		
Cardston	Martin Woolf	Liberal	1912	2nd term		
Centre Calgary	Thomas Tweedie	Conservative	1911	2nd term		
Claresholm	William Moffat	Liberal	1913	1st term		
Clearwater	Henry William McKenney	Liberal	1913	1st term		
Cochrane	Charles W. Fisher	Liberal	1905	3rd term		
Coronation	Frank H. Whiteside	Liberal	1913	1st term		
Didsbury	Joseph Stauffer	Liberal	1909	2nd term		
Edmonton	Albert Ewing	Conservative	1913	1st term		
Edmonton	Charles Wilson Cross	Liberal	1905	3rd term	Attorney General	
Edmonton South	Herbert Crawford	Conservative	1913	1st term		
Gleichen	John Peter McArthur	Liberal	1913	1st term		
Edson	Charles Wilson Cross	Liberal	1905	3rd term	Attorney General	
Grouard	Jean Côté	Liberal	1909	2nd term		
Hand Hills	Robert Eaton	Liberal	1913	1st term		
High River	George Douglas Stanley	Conservative	1913	1st term		
Innisfail	Fred W. Archer	Conservative	1913	1st term		
Lac Ste. Anne	Peter Gunn	Liberal	1909	2nd term		
Lacombe	William Puffer	Liberal	1905	3rd term		
Leduc	Stanley Tobin	Liberal	1913	1st term		
Lethbridge City	John Smith Stewart	Conservative	1911	2nd term		
Little Bow	James McNaughton	Liberal	1913	1st term		
Macleod	Robert Patterson	Conservative	1910 (Note: First elected as a Farmer)	2nd term		
Medicine Hat	Nelson Spencer	Conservative	1913	1st term		
Nanton	John M. Glendenning	Liberal	1909	2nd term		
North Calgary	Samuel Bacon Hillocks	Conservative	1913	1st term		
Okotoks	George Hoadley	Conservative	1909	2nd term		
Olds	Duncan Marshall	Liberal	1909	2nd term	Minister of Agriculture	
Peace River	Alphaeus Patterson	Conservative	1913	1st term		
Pembina	Gordon MacDonald	Liberal	1913	1st term		
Pincher Creek	John Kemmis	Conservative	1911	2nd term		
Ponoka	William A. Campbell	Liberal	1909	2nd term		
Red Deer	Edward Michener	Conservative	1909	2nd term		
Redcliff	Charles Pingle	Liberal	1913	1st term		
Ribstone	James Gray Turgeon	Liberal	1913	1st term		
Rocky Mountain	Robert Campbell	Conservative	1913	1st term		
Sedgewick	Charles Stewart	Liberal	1909	2nd term	Minister of Municipal Affairs; Minister of Public Works	Appointed Minister of Public Works November 28, 1913
South Calgary	Thomas Blow	Conservative	1913	1st term		
St. Albert	Lucien Boudreau	Liberal	1909	2nd term		
Stettler	Robert L. Shaw	Liberal	1909	2nd term		
St. Paul	Prosper-Edmond Lessard	Liberal	1913	1st term		
Stony Plain	Conrad Weidenhammer	Conservative	1913	1st term		
Sturgeon	John R. Boyle	Liberal	1905	3rd term	Minister of Education	
Taber	Archibald J. McLean	Liberal	1909	2nd term	Provincial Secretary	
Vegreville	Joseph S. McCallum	Liberal	1913	1st term		
Vermilion	Arthur Lewis Sifton	Liberal	1910	2nd term	Premier of Alberta; Provincial Treasurer	
Victoria	Francis A. Walker	Liberal	1905	3rd term		
Wainwright	George LeRoy Hudson	Conservative	1913	1st term		
Warner	Frank Leffingwell	Liberal	1913	1st term		
Wetaskiwin	Charles H. Olin	Liberal	1909	2nd term		
Wetaskiwin	Hugh John Montgomery (1914)	Liberal	1914	1st term		
Whitford	Andrew Shandro	Liberal	1913	1st term		

=== By-elections ===
District	Member	Party	Reason for By-Election
Bow Valley	Charles R. Mitchell	Liberal	June 12, 1913—Resignation of George Lane
Beaver River	Wilfrid Gariépy	Liberal	December 15, 1913— Wilfrid Gariepy appointed to cabinet.
Wetaskiwin	Hugh John Montgomery	Liberal	November 17, 1914— Death of Charles H. Olin.
Whitford	Andrew Shandro	Liberal	March 15, 1915— Election of Andrew Shandro declared void

=== Other membership changes ===
- September 29, 1916 – The Coronation constituency was left vacant after Liberal Frank H. Whiteside was shot and killed.
- June 14, 1916 – The Lac Ste. Anne constituency was left vacant after Liberal Peter Gunn resigned from the Legislature and appointed as the sheriff of the judicial district of Athabasca.
