= Coronation (provincial electoral district) =

Defunct provincial electoral district in Alberta, Canada

Alberta electoral district

Defunct provincial electoral district
- Legislature: Legislative Assembly of Alberta
- District created: 1913
- District abolished: 1940
- First contested: 1913
- Last contested: 1935

Coronation was a provincial electoral district in Alberta mandated to return a single member to the Legislative Assembly of Alberta from 1913 to 1926 using the First Past the Post voting system and using instant-runoff voting from 1926 to 1940.

== Electoral district history ==
The Coronation electoral district was created prior to the 1913 Alberta general election from a portion of the Sedgewick electoral district. The Coronation electoral district was re-distributed prior to the 1940 Alberta general election, the area the district covered was merged with Acadia to form the riding of Acadia-Coronation.

=== Members of the Legislative Assembly (MLAs) ===
The first representative for the district, Liberal Frank H. Whiteside was killed in September 1916, no by-election was held to fill the seat.

Members of the Legislative Assembly for Coronation
Assembly	Years	Member	Party
See Sedgewick electoral district from 1909-1913
3rd	1913–1916	Frank H. Whiteside	Liberal
4th	1917–1921	William Wallace Wilson	Conservative
5th	1921–1926	George Norman Johnston	United Farmers
6th	1926–1930	George Norman Johnston	United Farmers
7th	1930–1935	George Norman Johnston	United Farmers
8th	1935–1940	Glenville L. MacLachlan	United Farmers
See Acadia-Coronation electoral district from 1940-1963

== Election results ==
=== 1913 ===
1913 Alberta general election
Party	Candidate	Votes	%	±%
Liberal	Frank H. Whiteside	739	51.61%	–
Conservative	William Wallace Wilson	693	48.39%	–
Total		1,432	–	–
Rejected, spoiled and declined		N/A	–	–
Eligible electors / turnout		2,592	55.25%	–
Liberal pickup new district.				
Source(s) Source: "Coronation Official Results 1913 Alberta general election". Alberta Heritage Community Foundation.

=== 1917 ===
1917 Alberta general election
Party	Candidate	Votes	%	±%
Conservative	William Wallace Wilson	1,782	53.08%	4.69%
Liberal	Harry S. Northwood	1,575	46.92%	-4.69%
Total		3,357	–	–
Rejected, spoiled and declined		N/A	–	–
Eligible electors / turnout		5,531	N/A	–
Conservative gain from Liberal		Swing		1.48%
Source(s) Source: "Coronation Official Results 1917 Alberta general election". Alberta Heritage Community Foundation.

=== 1921 ===
1921 Alberta general election
Party	Candidate	Votes	%	±%
United Farmers	George Norman Johnston	3736	79.56%	–
Liberal	Arthur M. Day	945	20.12%	-16.80%
Total		4,696	–	–
Rejected, spoiled and declined		N/A	–	–
Eligible electors / turnout		6,256	75.06%	–
United Farmers gain from Conservative		Swing		16.80%
Source(s) Source: "Coronation Official Results 1921 Alberta general election". Alberta Heritage Community Foundation.

=== 1926 ===
1926 Alberta general election
Party	Candidate	Votes	%	±%
United Farmers	George Norman Johnston	2,387	62.32%	-17.24%
Liberal	Arthur M. Day	945	24.67%	4.55%
Conservative	A. O. Thomas	498	13.00%	–
Total		3,830	–	–
Rejected, spoiled and declined		238	–	–
Eligible electors / turnout		5,130	79.30%	–
United Farmers hold		Swing		-10.90%
Source(s) Source: "Coronation Official Results 1926 Alberta general election". Alberta Heritage Community Foundation.

=== 1930 ===
1930 Alberta general election
Party	Candidate	Votes	%	±%
United Farmers	George Norman Johnston	2,084	51.24%	-11.08%
Independent	Arthur M. Day	1,983	48.76%	–
Total		4,067	–	–
Rejected, spoiled and declined		156	–	–
Eligible electors / turnout		5,248	80.47%	–
United Farmers hold		Swing		-17.58%
Source(s) Source: "Coronation Official Results 1930 Alberta general election". Alberta Heritage Community Foundation.

=== 1935 ===
1935 Alberta general election
Party	Candidate	Votes	%	±%
Social Credit	Glenville L. MacLachlan	2,674	64.54%	–
United Farmers	C. C. Wager	844	20.37%	-30.87%
Liberal	Robert Densmore	625	15.09%	–
Total		4,143	–	–
Rejected, spoiled and declined		120	–	–
Eligible electors / turnout		4,876	87.43%	–
Social Credit gain from United Farmers		Swing		20.84%
Source(s) Source: "Coronation Official Results 1935 Alberta general election". Alberta Heritage Community Foundation.

== See also ==
- List of Alberta provincial electoral districts
- Coronation, Alberta, a town in east-central Alberta, Canada, within the County of Paintearth No. 18
