= James Gray Turgeon =

Canadian politician (1879–1964)

The Honourable James Gray Turgeon
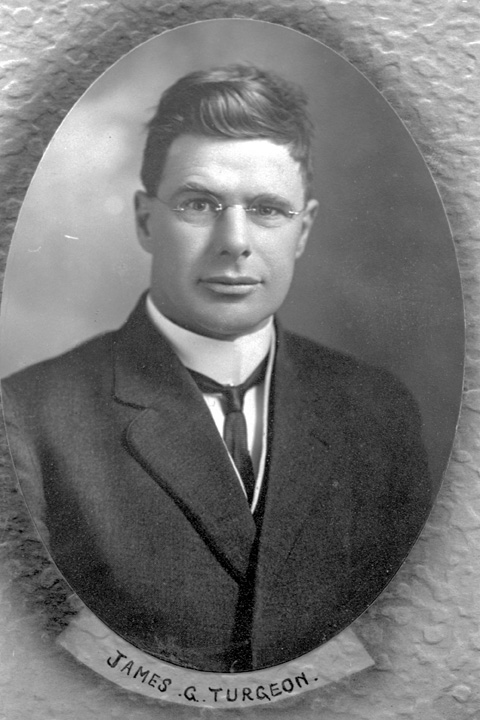

Member of the Legislative Assembly of Alberta for Ribstone
- In office March 25, 1913 – July 18, 1921
- Preceded by: James Lowery
- Succeeded by: Charles Wright

Member of Parliament for Cariboo
- In office October 14, 1935 – June 11, 1945
- Preceded by: John Fraser
- Succeeded by: William Irvine

Canadian Senator from British Columbia
- In office January 27, 1947 – February 14, 1964

Personal details
- Born: October 7, 1879 Bathurst, New Brunswick, Canada
- Died: February 14, 1964 (aged 84)
- Party: Liberal
- Parent: Onésiphore Turgeon

Military service
- Allegiance: Canada
- Branch/service: Canadian Expeditionary Force
- Years of service: 1914–1918
- Rank: Lieutenant
- Battles/wars: World War I

James Gray Turgeon (October 7, 1879 – February 14, 1964) was a broker, soldier, and provincial and federal level politician from Canada. He served as a member of the Legislative Assembly of Alberta from 1913 to 1921 sitting with the Alberta Liberal caucus in government. During that time he also served in World War I.

Turgeon had a long career in federal politics. He served as a Member of the House of Commons of Canada from 1935 to 1947 and he also served as a Canadian Senator from 1947 to his death in 1964 sitting with the federal Liberal caucus in both houses.

== Early life ==
Turgeon was born on October 7, 1879, in Bathurst, New Brunswick. His father was Onésiphore Turgeon a prominent federal politician. He had one brother William who also became a prominent politician.

== Political career ==
=== Alberta politics ===
Turgeon ran for a seat to the Alberta Legislature for the first time in the 1913 Alberta general election as a Liberal candidate. He defeated Conservative candidate William Blair to pick up the new Ribstone electoral district for his party.

During the 3rd Legislature, the Assembly passed An Act amending The Election Act respecting Members of the Legislative Assembly on Active Service (Bill 58) which acclaimed members of the assembly in the 1917 election who were serving in armed forces during the First World War. The Act listed eleven members of the assembly and provided those members were deemed nominated and elected as a member of the 4th Alberta Legislature, effectively being acclaimed in the 1917 election, including James Turgeon, who served as a lieutenant in the Canadian Army 233rd Battalion and later 258th Battalion during the war.

Turgeon ran for a third term in the 1921 Alberta general election. He was defeated in a landslide by United Farmers of Alberta candidate Charles Wright.

=== World War I ===
Turgeon enlisted in the Canadian Expeditionary Force while he was still a member of the Alberta Legislature in 1914. He served as a lieutenant in the army until 1918. Turgeon spent two months overseas in England and accompanied Pierre-Édouard Blondin on a ten-day visit to France before returning to Canada. Turgeon was struck from the strength of the Canadian Expeditionary Force on January 21, 1918, for reason of being "Surplus to Requirements".

=== British Columbia politics ===
Turgeon moved to British Columbia, he ran for a seat to the Legislative Assembly of British Columbia in the 1933 British Columbia general election as a candidate for the British Columbia Liberals in the riding of Vancouver East he was defeated only obtaining 16% of the vote and finishing in fourth place out of thirteen candidates.

Two years later, Turgeon would run for a seat in the House of Commons of Canada in the 1935 Canadian federal election as a federal Liberal candidate. He defeated Incumbent John Fraser and three other candidates.

Turgeon ran for a second term in the 1940 Canadian federal election. He won a hotly contested three-way race over Co-operative Commonwealth candidate William Irvine to hold his seat.

The 1945 federal election would see Turgeon and Irvine face each other for the second time. This time Turgeon went down to defeat finishing a close second in the four-way race.

After his defeat, Turgeon was appointed to the Canadian Senate on the advice of Prime Minister Mackenzie King on January 27, 1947. He designated his senate division as Cariboo, British Columbia. He would serve in the Senate until his death on February 14, 1964.
