= George R. Barker =

Canadian politician (1881-1958)

George Russel Barker

Member of the Legislative Assembly of Alberta
- In office June 7, 1917 – July 18, 1921
- Preceded by: Peter Gunn
- Succeeded by: Charles McKeen
- Constituency: Lac Ste. Anne

Personal details
- Born: 26 October 1881 Melbourne, Australia
- Died: 16 November 1958 (aged 77)
- Party: Conservative
- Occupation: politician

George Russell Barker was a provincial politician from Alberta, Canada. He served as a member of the Legislative Assembly of Alberta from 1917 to 1921 sitting with the Conservative caucus in opposition.

== Political career ==
Barker ran for a seat to the Alberta Legislature for the first time in the 1913 general election at the Conservative candidate in the Lac Ste. Anne electoral district. He was defeated by Liberal incumbent Peter Gunn in a hotly contested straight fight, losing by only 43 votes.

He attempted another run for a seat in the Legislature in the 1917 Alberta general election, again running in Lac Ste Anne. The election was hotly contested as Barker won by 34 votes over Liberal candidate Ralph Barker. The unofficial returns had Liberal candidate winning with a majority of one vote. Early in the counting Ralph Barker had conceded the race to George Barker. This was later reversed on a recount with George Barker picking up the district for his party.

Barker did not run for another term at dissolution of the Legislature at dissolution in 1921, but tried to win his seat back in the 1926 Alberta general election; he was defeated, however, finishing a distant second in the three-way race to Charles McKeen.
