= David Lush =

Canadian politician

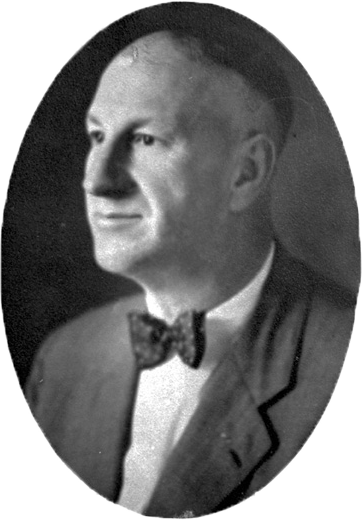

Member of the Legislative Assembly of Alberta
- In office August 22, 1935 – March 21, 1940
- Preceded by: William Smith
- Succeeded by: District Abolished
- Constituency: Empress

Personal details
- Born: December 31, 1887 Guelph, Ontario
- Died: November 8, 1960 (aged 72) Empress, Alberta
- Party: Social Credit

David Lush (December 31, 1887 – November 8, 1960) was a provincial politician from Alberta, Canada. He served as a member of the Legislative Assembly of Alberta from 1935 to 1940 sitting with the Social Credit caucus in government.

== Political career ==
Lush ran for a seat to the Alberta Legislature as a Social Credit candidate in the electoral district of Empress for the 1935 Alberta general election. He defeated incumbent William Smith and other candidate with a landslide majority to pick up the seat for his party.

Empress merged with Bow Valley in the 1939 boundary redistribution to form Bow Valley-Empress. Lush retired from provincial politics at dissolution of the assembly in 1940.
