= Bryce Stringam =

Canadian politician (1920–2000)

Bryce Coleman Stringam

Member of the Legislative Assembly of Alberta
- In office June 29, 1955 – June 18, 1959
- Preceded by: Wilson Cain
- Succeeded by: William Delday
- Constituency: Bow Valley-Empress

Personal details
- Born: February 8, 1920 Cardston, Alberta
- Died: June 2, 2000 (aged 80) Calgary, Alberta
- Party: Independent
- Spouse: Mary Morgan
- Occupation: cattle rancher, author and politician

Bryce Coleman Stringam (February 8, 1920 – June 2, 2000) was a politician and author from Alberta, Canada. He served in the Legislative Assembly of Alberta from 1955 to 1959 as an independent.

== Early life ==
Stringam's father, George Stringam, was a member of the Alberta legislature. Stringam graduated from Olds College with a degree in agronomy in 1937 and became a cattle rancher. He married Mary Morgan and fathered seven children.

== Political career ==
Stringam first ran for a seat in the Alberta Legislature in the 1955 general election. Running as an independent in the electoral district of Bow Valley-Empress, he defeated incumbent Wilson Cain.

Stringam ran for a second term in office in the 1959 general election and was defeated by Social Credit candidate William Delday in a two-way race.

== Late life ==
After his defeat, Stringam published a book titled The History of the Eastern Irrigation District: 25th Anniversary in 1960.
