= Ribstone (provincial electoral district) =

Defunct provincial electoral district in Alberta, Canada

Coordinates: 52.7101992°N 111.3855325°W

Alberta electoral district

Defunct provincial electoral district
- Legislature: Legislative Assembly of Alberta
- District created: 1913
- District abolished: 1940
- First contested: 1913
- Last contested: 1935

Ribstone was a provincial electoral district in Alberta, Canada, mandated to return a single member to the Legislative Assembly of Alberta using the first past the post method of voting from 1913 to 1940.

Ribstone is named for the Hamlet of Ribstone, Alberta.

== Members of the Legislative Assembly (MLAs) ==
Members of the Legislative Assembly for Ribstone
Assembly	Years	Member	Party
See Sedgewick electoral district from 1909-1913
3rd	1913–1917	James Gray Turgeon	Liberal
4th	1917–1921	James Gray Turgeon	Liberal
5th	1921–1926	Charles O. Wright	United Farmers
6th	1926–1930	William George Farquharson	United Farmers
7th	1930–1935	William George Farquharson	United Farmers
8th	1935–1940	Albert Lester Blue	Social Credit
See Wainwright electoral district from 1940-2004 and Acadia-Coronation electoral district from 1940-1963

== Electoral history ==
=== 1913 ===
1913 Alberta general election
Party	Candidate	Votes	%	±%
Liberal	James Gray Turgeon	669	55.56%	0.00%
Conservative	William John Blair	535	44.44%	0.00%
Total		1,204	–	–
Rejected, spoiled and declined		N/A	–	–
Eligible electors / turnout		N/A	N/A	–
Liberal pickup new district.				
Source(s) Source: "Ribstone Official Results 1913 Alberta general election". Alberta Heritage Community Foundation.

=== 1917 ===
1917 Alberta general election
Party	Candidate	Votes	%	±%
Liberal	James Gray Turgeon	Acclaimed	–	–
Total		N/A	–	–
Rejected, spoiled and declined		N/A	–	–
Eligible electors / turnout		N/A	N/A	–
Liberal hold		Swing		N/A
Source(s) Source: "Ribstone Official Results 1917 Alberta general election". Alberta Heritage Community Foundation. One of eleven Members of the Legislative Assembly of Alberta acclaimed under The Elections Act Section 38, which stipulated that any member of the 3rd Alberta Legislative Assembly would be guaranteed re-election, with no contest held, if the member joined for wartime service in the First World War. An Act amending The Election Act respecting Members of the Legislative Assembly on Active Service., SA 1917, c. 38

=== 1921 ===
1921 Alberta general election
Party	Candidate	Votes	%	±%
United Farmers	Charles O. Wright	2,192	70.69%	–
Liberal	James Gray Turgeon	909	29.31%	–
Total		3,101	–	–
Rejected, spoiled and declined		N/A	–	–
Eligible electors / turnout		N/A	N/A	–
United Farmers gain from Liberal		Swing		N/A
Source(s) Source: "Ribstone Official Results 1921 Alberta general election". Alberta Heritage Community Foundation.

From 1924 to 1940, the district used instant-runoff voting to elect its MLA.

=== 1926 ===
1926 Alberta general election
Party	Candidate	Votes	%	±%
United Farmers	William George Farquharson	1,524	62.72%	-7.97%
Liberal	Allen Johnstone	622	25.60%	-3.72%
Conservative	E.C. Tregale	284	11.69%	–
Total		2,430	–	–
Rejected, spoiled and declined		215	–	–
Eligible electors / turnout		3,767	70.22%	–
United Farmers hold		Swing		-2.13%
Source(s) Source: "Ribstone Official Results 1926 Alberta general election". Alberta Heritage Community Foundation.

=== 1930 ===
1930 Alberta general election
Party	Candidate	Votes	%	±%
United Farmers	William George Farquharson	1,672	60.14%	-2.57%
Liberal	James Lees	837	30.11%	4.51%
Conservative	Daniel Glockzin	271	9.75%	-1.94%
Total		2,780	–	–
Rejected, spoiled and declined		157	–	–
Eligible electors / turnout		4,093	71.76%	–
United Farmers hold		Swing		-3.54%
Source(s) Source: "Ribstone Official Results 1930 Alberta general election". Alberta Heritage Community Foundation.

=== 1935 ===
1935 Alberta general election
Party	Candidate	Votes	%	±%
Social Credit	Albert Lester Blue	2,684	71.16%	–
Liberal	R.M. Lee	589	15.62%	-14.49%
United Farmers	William George Farquharson	499	13.23%	-46.91%
Total		3,772	–	–
Rejected, spoiled and declined		117	–	–
Eligible electors / turnout		4,455	87.30%	–
Social Credit gain from United Farmers		Swing		12.75%
Source(s) Source: "Ribstone Official Results 1935 Alberta general election". Alberta Heritage Community Foundation.

== See also ==
- List of Alberta provincial electoral districts
- Canadian provincial electoral districts
