= William Wallace Wilson =

Canadian politician (1876–1967)

Member of the Legislative Assembly of Alberta
- In office June 7, 1917 – July 18, 1921
- Preceded by: Frank H. Whiteside
- Succeeded by: George Johnston
- Constituency: Coronation

Personal details
- Born: October 26, 1876 Fergus, Ontario
- Died: August 20, 1967 (aged 90)
- Party: Conservative
- Spouse: Janie M. Armstrong (m. 1903)
- Children: four
- Occupation: rancher; politician

William Wallace Wilson (October 26, 1876 – August 20, 1967) was a provincial level politician from Alberta, Canada.

== Early life ==
Wilson was born October 26, 1876, in Fergus, Ontario, to James Wilson and Jacqueline Gartshore.

== Political career ==
Wilson was an unsuccessful candidate in the 1913 Alberta general election for the Coronation district, losing to Liberal Frank H. Whiteside. Wilson was elected to the Legislative Assembly of Alberta in the 1917 Alberta general election. He defeated Harry S. Northwood to pick up the vacant Coronation district for the Conservative Party. Wilson only served a single term in office and did not run again when the legislature was dissolved in 1921.

Legislative Assembly of Alberta
Preceded by Frank H. Whiteside	MLA Coronation; 1917–1921	Succeeded by George Johnston
