= John Archibald Mills =

Canadian politician (1910–1986)

Member of the Legislative Assembly of Alberta
- In office June 29, 1955 – June 18, 1959
- Preceded by: Angelo Montemurro
- Succeeded by: William Patterson
- Constituency: Lac Ste. Anne

Personal details
- Born: August 19, 1910 Onoway, Alberta, Canada
- Died: April 15, 1986 (aged 75) Edmonton, Alberta, Canada
- Party: Liberal
- Spouse: Miriam Mills
- Children: Raymond Sidney Mills
- Occupation: politician

John Archibald Mills (August 19, 1910 – April 15, 1986) was a provincial politician from Alberta, Canada. He served as a member of the Legislative Assembly of Alberta from 1955 to 1959 sitting with the Liberal caucus in opposition.

== Political career ==
Mills ran for a seat to the Alberta Legislature in the 1955 Alberta general election. He stood as the Liberal candidate in the electoral district of Lac Ste. Anne for the Liberal party. The race was hotly contested by all three candidates. Mills finished second behind incumbent Angelo Montemurro on the first vote count. He surged into first place on significant second preference votes from Co-operative Commonwealth candidate Harold Bronson to pick up the seat.

Mills ran for a second term in the 1959 Alberta general election. He was easily defeated by Social Credit candidate William Patterson finishing a distant third place out of four candidates.
