= Albert Bourcier =

Canadian politician (1901-1982)

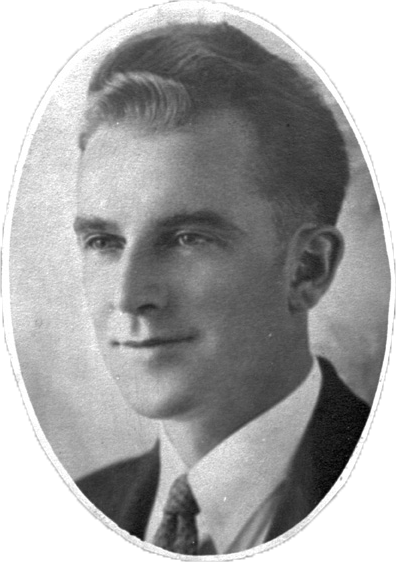

Member of the Legislative Assembly of Alberta
- In office 1935–1952
- Preceded by: Charles McKeen
- Succeeded by: Angelo Montemurro
- Constituency: Lac Ste. Anne

Personal details
- Born: August 25, 1901 Northbridge, Massachusetts, United States
- Died: February 8, 1982 (aged 80) Edmonton, Alberta, Canada
- Party: Social Credit

Albert Vital Bourcier (August 25, 1901 – February 8, 1982) was a provincial politician from Alberta, Canada. He served as a member of the Legislative Assembly of Alberta from 1935 to 1952, sitting with the Social Credit caucus in government.

Bourcier was born August 25, 1901, in Northbridge, Massachusetts, to Alfred F. Bourcier an American, and Margaret LaCase a Canadian. They immigrated to Canada in 1912, where Albert was educated in Edmonton.

An internal controversy occurred when Bourcier filed papers to contest the 1967 Alberta general election in the Edmonton-Jasper Place constituency against incumbent Social Credit MLA John Horan. Bourcier was still an active member of the Social Credit Party, but was ejected from the party prior to the election. It was the second time Bourcier was ejected from the party, the first being in 1949 as a sitting MLA. Horan was re-elected with 36.3 per cent of the vote, while Bourcier received 1.5 per cent of the vote.
