= Angelo Montemurro =

Canadian politician

Member of the Legislative Assembly of Alberta
- In office 1952–1955
- Preceded by: Albert Bourcier
- Succeeded by: John Archibald Mills
- Constituency: Lac Ste. Anne

Personal details
- Born: April 6, 1893 Mangone, Cosenza, Italy
- Died: April 3, 1983 (aged 89) Alberta, Canada
- Party: Social Credit

Angelo Mario Montemurro (April 6, 1893 – April 3, 1983) was a provincial politician from Alberta, Canada. He served as a member of the Legislative Assembly of Alberta from 1952 to 1955, sitting with the Social Credit caucus in government.
