= Albert Blue =

Canadian politician

Albert L. Blue
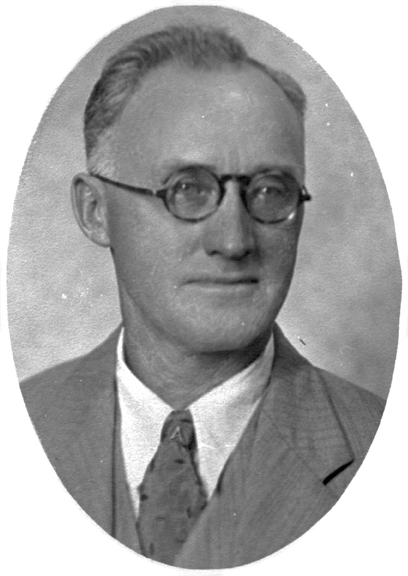

Member of the Legislative Assembly of Alberta
- In office 1935–1940
- Preceded by: William Farquharson
- Succeeded by: District abolished
- Constituency: Ribstone

Personal details
- Born: October 19, 1881 Gibbon, Nebraska, United States
- Died: September 16, 1967 (aged 85) Cypress River, Manitoba, Canada
- Party: Social Credit; Independent Progressive

Albert Lester Blue (October 19, 1881 – September 16, 1967) was a provincial politician from Alberta, Canada. He served as a member of the Legislative Assembly of Alberta from 1935 to 1940, sitting with the Social Credit caucus in government.
