= Lorne Proudfoot =

Canadian politician

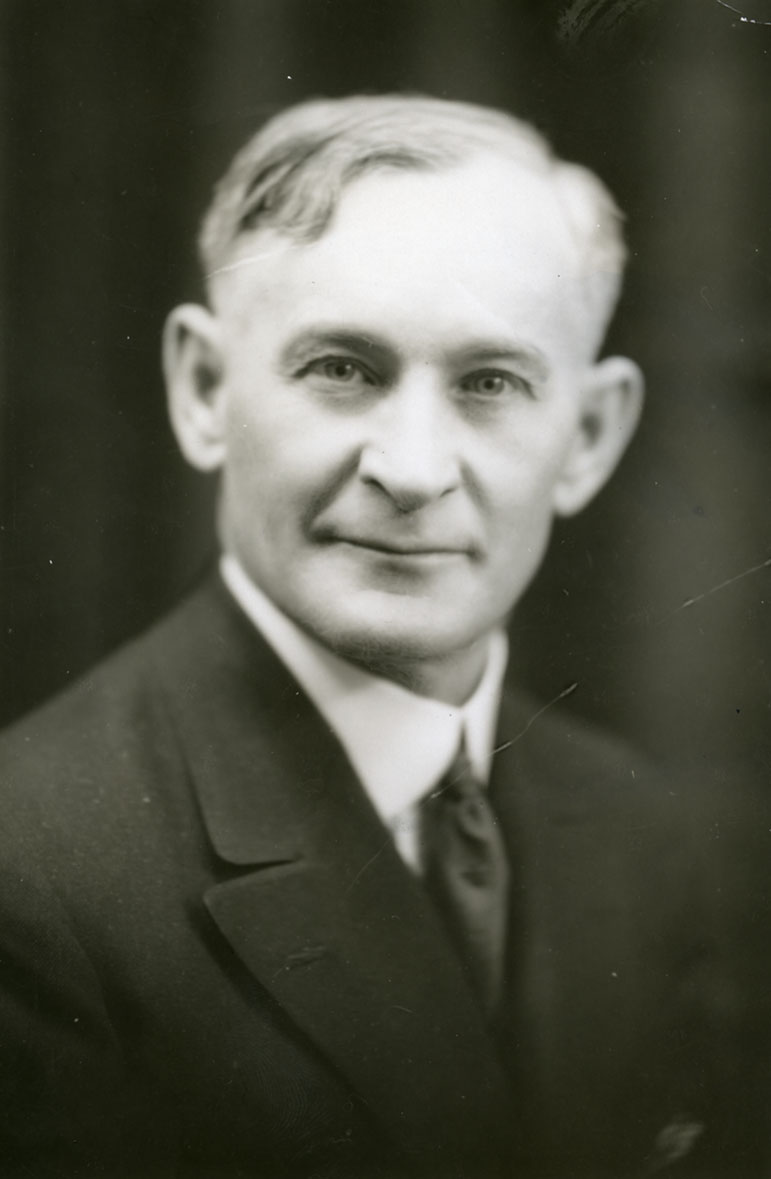

Member of the Legislative Assembly of Alberta
- In office July 18, 1921 – August 22, 1935
- Preceded by: John McColl
- Succeeded by: Norman James
- Constituency: Acadia

Personal details
- Born: October 8, 1880 Vankleek Hill, Ontario
- Died: January 10, 1977 (aged 96) Alberta
- Party: United Farmers
- Spouse: Hilda Mary Roberts
- Children: Kathleen, James, Eileen, Robert and William
- Occupation: teacher, farmer and politician

Lorne Proudfoot (October 8, 1880 – January 10, 1977) was a farmer, teacher and a provincial politician from Alberta, Canada. He served as a member of the Legislative Assembly of Alberta from 1921 to 1935 sitting with the United Farmers caucus in government.

== Early life ==
Lorne Proudfoot was born in 1880 on a farm outside of Vankleek Hill, Ontario. He came out west in 1903, and attended normal school in Regina, Saskatchewan. He later moved to Alberta and began his teaching career at a rural school near the towns of Carstairs and Didsbury. He moved to Chinook, Alberta in 1909 and began farming. He married his wife Hilda Mary Roberts in 1917.

== Political career ==
Proudfoot ran for a seat to the Alberta Legislature as an Independent candidate in the 1917 Alberta general election in the electoral district of Acadia. The group Proudfoot was a part of what was known formally as the Independent Political Association, Constituency of Acadia was affiliated with the Alberta Non-Partisan League. He finished a distant third place losing to incumbent John McColl.

Proudfoot ran for his second time in the 1921 Alberta general election as a candidate for the United Farmers of Alberta. He won the two-person race with a landslide majority to pick up the district for his party.

Proudfoot ran for a second term in office in the 1926 Alberta general election. He faced two other candidates. Despite losing a large portion of his popular vote from 1921 he still won the district with a solid majority.

Proudfoot ran for his third term in office in the 1930 Alberta general election. He won the two way race easily over an Independent candidate.

Proudfoot ran for his fourth term in office in the 1935 Alberta general election. He was defeated in the three way race finishing a distant second losing to Social Credit candidate Norman James.

== Late life ==
After his defeat from office Proudfoot continued to farm, specializing in raising sheep. Like many of his neighbors in the arid southeastern Alberta region, he came close to bankruptcy during the 1930s. He eventually expanded his farming operation to 18,000 acres by the time of his retirement in 1962.

He also continued to have active political involvement. He continued to work in organizations to elect independent candidates in 1940, 1944, and 1963. Though no candidates were successful, the Independent Electors of the Acadia-Coronation Constituency almost managed to get former Speaker of the Legislature George Johnston re-elected in the 1940 general election.

Proudfoot served on numerous local municipal boards, usually related to education and agriculture. He was always an advocate of the "principles of cooperation" and worked hard to maintain the economic viability of the small village of Chinook. His experiences in politics gave him greater knowledge of legal and financial matters than most of his neighbors. He served as secretary-treasurer of the Chinook Consolidated School District during the entire period of its existence, 1916-1961. He was secretary-treasurer of the Village of Chinook from 1943 to 1968. He died in 1977.
