= Lac Ste. Anne (electoral district) =

Defunct provincial electoral district in Alberta, Canada

Alberta electoral district

Defunct provincial electoral district
- Legislature: Legislative Assembly of Alberta
- District created: 1909
- District abolished: 1971
- First contested: 1909
- Last contested: 1967

Lac Ste. Anne was a provincial electoral district in Alberta, Canada, mandated to return a single member to the Legislative Assembly of Alberta from 1909 to 1971.

== History ==
Lac Ste. Anne electoral district was created out of Stony Plain electoral district in 1909.

From 1924 to 1956, the district used instant-runoff voting to elect its MLA.

Lac Ste. Anne electoral district was abolished in 1970 and distributed into Stony Plain, Barrhead, and Whitecourt electoral districts.

=== Members of the Legislative Assembly (MLAs) ===
Members of the Legislative Assembly for Lac Ste. Anne
Assembly	Years	Member	Party
See Stony Plain electoral district from 1905-1909
2nd	1909–1913	Peter Gunn	Liberal
3rd	1913–1917	Peter Gunn	Liberal
4th	1917–1921	George R. Barker	Conservative
5th	1921–1926	Charles M. McKeen	United Farmers
6th	1926–1930	Charles M. McKeen	United Farmers
7th	1930–1935	Charles M. McKeen	United Farmers
8th	1935–1940	Albert V. Bourcier	Social Credit
9th	1940–1944	Albert V. Bourcier	Social Credit
10th	1944–1948	Albert V. Bourcier	Social Credit
11th	1948–1952	Albert V. Bourcier	Social Credit
12th	1952–1955	Angelo M. Montemurro	Social Credit
13th	1955–1959	Angelo M. Montemurro	Social Credit
14th	1959–1963	William Patterson	Social Credit
15th	1963–1967	William Patterson	Social Credit
16th	1967–1971	Hugh Horner	Progressive Conservative
See Stony Plain electoral district from 1971-2019, Barrhead electoral district from 1971-1993 and Whitecourt electoral district from 1971-1993

== Election results ==
=== 1909 ===
1909 Alberta general election
Party	Candidate	Votes	%	±%
Liberal	Peter Gunn	Acclaimed	–	–
Total		N/A	–	–
Rejected, spoiled and declined		N/A	–	–
Eligible electors / turnout		N/A	N/A	–
Liberal pickup new district.				
Source(s) Source: "Lac Ste. Anne Official Results 1909 Alberta general election". Alberta Heritage Community Foundation.

=== 1913 ===
1913 Alberta general election
Party	Candidate	Votes	%	±%
Liberal	Peter Gunn	517	52.17%	–
Conservative	George R. Barker	474	47.83%	–
Total		991	–	–
Rejected, spoiled and declined		N/A	–	–
Eligible electors / turnout		1,101	90.00%	–
Liberal hold		Swing		N/A
Source(s) Source: "Lac Ste. Anne Official Results 1913 Alberta general election". Alberta Heritage Community Foundation.

=== 1917 ===
1917 Alberta general election
Party	Candidate	Votes	%	±%
Conservative	George R. Barker	800	51.09%	3.26%
Liberal	Ralph E. Barker	766	48.91%	-3.26%
Total		1,566	–	–
Rejected, spoiled and declined		N/A	–	–
Eligible electors / turnout		1,961	79.86%	-10.14%
Conservative gain from Liberal		Swing		-1.08%
Source(s) Source: "Lac Ste. Anne Official Results 1917 Alberta general election". Alberta Heritage Community Foundation.

=== 1921 ===
1921 Alberta general election
Party	Candidate	Votes	%	±%
United Farmers	Charles M. McKeen	1,574	62.02%	–
Liberal	C. J. Stiles	837	32.98%	-15.94%
Independent	J. H. Mackay	127	5.00%	–
Total		2,538	–	–
Rejected, spoiled and declined		N/A	–	–
Eligible electors / turnout		2,784	91.16%	11.30%
United Farmers gain from Conservative		Swing		13.43%
Source(s) Source: "Lac Ste. Anne Official Results 1921 Alberta general election". Alberta Heritage Community Foundation.

=== 1926 ===
1926 Alberta general election
Party	Candidate	Votes	%	±%
United Farmers	Charles M. McKeen	1,757	70.62%	8.60%
Conservative	George R. Barker	492	19.77%	–
Liberal	Henry White	239	9.61%	-23.37%
Total		2,488	–	–
Rejected, spoiled and declined		144	–	–
Eligible electors / turnout		3,927	67.02%	-24.14%
United Farmers hold		Swing		10.90%
Source(s) Source: "Lac Ste. Anne Official Results 1926 Alberta general election". Alberta Heritage Community Foundation.

=== 1930 ===
1930 Alberta general election
Party	Candidate	Votes	%	±%
United Farmers	Charles M. McKeen	Acclaimed	–	–
Total		N/A	–	–
Rejected, spoiled and declined		N/A	–	–
Eligible electors / turnout		N/A	N/A	–
United Farmers hold		Swing		N/A
Source(s) Source: "Lac Ste. Anne Official Results 1930 Alberta general election". Alberta Heritage Community Foundation.

=== 1935 ===
1935 Alberta general election
Party	Candidate	Votes	%	±%
First count
Social Credit	Albert V. Bourcier	1,668	44.15%	–
United Farmers	Charles M. McKeen	1,080	28.59%	–
Liberal	N. V. Buchannan	897	23.74%	–
Conservative	Ernest Jolly	133	3.52%	–
Total		3,778	–	–
Ballot transfer results
Social Credit	Albert V. Bourcier	1,791	54.13%	–
United Farmers	Charles M. McKeen	1,518	45.87%	–
Total		3,309	–	–
Rejected, spoiled and declined		153	–	–
Eligible electors / turnout		5,201	75.58%	–
Social Credit gain from United Farmers		Swing		N/A
Source(s) Source: "Lac Ste. Anne Official Results 1935 Alberta general election". Alberta Heritage Community Foundation.

=== 1940 ===
1940 Alberta general election
Party	Candidate	Votes	%	±%
First count
Social Credit	Albert V. Bourcier	1,612	40.70%	-3.45%
Independent	Philip Keeley	1,239	31.28%	–
Co-operative Commonwealth	Mrs. Nellie H. Peterson	1,110	28.02%	–
Total		3,961	–	–
Ballot transfer results
Social Credit	Albert V. Bourcier	1,839	51.91%	–
Independent	Philip Keeley	1,704	48.09%	–
Total		3,543	–	–
Rejected, spoiled and declined		246	–	–
Eligible electors / turnout		6,380	65.94%	-9.64%
Social Credit hold		Swing		N/A
Source(s) Source: "Lac Ste. Anne Official Results 1940 Alberta general election". Alberta Heritage Community Foundation.

=== 1944 ===
1944 Alberta general election
Party	Candidate	Votes	%	±%
Social Credit	Albert V. Bourcier	2,209	55.56%	14.86%
Co-operative Commonwealth	Nellie Peterson	1,767	44.44%	14.16%
Total		3,976	–	–
Rejected, spoiled and declined		26	–	–
Eligible electors / turnout		6,293	63.59%	-2.35%
Social Credit hold		Swing		N/A
Source(s) Source: "Lac Ste. Anne Official Results 1944 Alberta general election". Alberta Heritage Community Foundation.

=== 1948 ===
1948 Alberta general election
Party	Candidate	Votes	%	±%
First count
Social Credit	Albert V. Bourcier	1,899	42.02%	-13.54%
Co-operative Commonwealth	Nellie Peterson	1,558	34.48%	-9.96%
Liberal	Leo O. Crockett, Jr.	1,023	22.64%	–
Independent	George W. Thompson	39	0.86%	–
Total		4,519	–	–
Ballot transfer results
Social Credit	Albert V. Bourcier	2,401	57.95%	–
Co-operative Commonwealth	Nellie Peterson	1,742	42.05%	–
Total		4,143	–	–
Rejected, spoiled and declined		290	–	–
Eligible electors / turnout		6,899	69.71%	6.12%
Social Credit hold		Swing		N/A
Source(s) Source: "Lac Ste. Anne Official Results 1948 Alberta general election". Alberta Heritage Community Foundation.

=== 1952 ===
1952 Alberta general election
Party	Candidate	Votes	%	±%
First count
Social Credit	Angelo M. Montemurro	1,639	34.89%	-7.13%
Co-operative Commonwealth	Harold E. Bronson	1,520	32.36%	-2.12%
Liberal	Douglas P. McKeen	1,069	22.76%	0.12%
Independent Social Credit	Albert V. Bourcier	469	9.99%	–
Total		4,697	–	–
Ballot transfer results
Social Credit	Angelo M. Montemurro	2,034	51.99%	–
Co-operative Commonwealth	Harold E. Bronson	1,878	48.01%	–
Total		3,912	–	–
Rejected, spoiled and declined		404	–	–
Eligible electors / turnout		7,094	71.91%	2.20%
Social Credit hold		Swing		N/A
Source(s) Source: "Lac Ste. Anne Official Results 1952 Alberta general election". Alberta Heritage Community Foundation.

=== 1955 ===
1955 Alberta general election
Party	Candidate	Votes	%	±%
First count
Social Credit	Angelo M. Montemurro	1,965	39.12%	4.23%
Liberal	John Archibald Mills	1,684	33.53%	10.77%
Co-operative Commonwealth	Harold Bronson	1,374	27.35%	-5.01%
Total		5,023	–	–
Ballot transfer results
Liberal	John Archibald Mills	2,592	55.01%	–
Social Credit	Angelo M. Montemurro	2,120	44.99%	–
Total		4,712	–	–
Rejected, spoiled and declined		377	–	–
Eligible electors / turnout		7,052	76.57%	4.66%
Liberal gain from Social Credit		Swing		N/A%
Source(s) Source: "Lac Ste. Anne Official Results 1955 Alberta general election". Alberta Heritage Community Foundation.

=== 1959 ===
1959 Alberta general election
Party	Candidate	Votes	%	±%
Social Credit	William Patterson	2,286	46.62%	7.50%
Progressive Conservative	L. D. Gould	1,129	23.02%	–
Liberal	John Liss	907	18.50%	-15.03%
Co-operative Commonwealth	Charley Keeley	582	11.87%	-15.48%
Total		4,904	–	–
Rejected, spoiled and declined		9	–	–
Eligible electors / turnout		7,008	70.11%	-6.46%
Social Credit gain from Liberal		Swing		N/A%
Source(s) Source: "Lac Ste. Anne Official Results 1959 Alberta general election". Alberta Heritage Community Foundation.

=== 1963 ===
1963 Alberta general election
Party	Candidate	Votes	%	±%
Social Credit	William Patterson	2,777	52.27%	5.65%
Liberal	Douglas McKeen	1,794	33.77%	15.27%
New Democratic	John Liss	742	13.97%	2.10%
Total		5,313	–	–
Rejected, spoiled and declined		34	–	–
Eligible electors / turnout		8,179	65.37%	-4.74%
Social Credit hold		Swing		-7.92%
Source(s) Source: "Lac Ste. Anne Official Results 1963 Alberta general election". Alberta Heritage Community Foundation.

=== 1967 ===
1967 Alberta general election
Party	Candidate	Votes	%	±%
Progressive Conservative	Hugh Horner	2,573	45.13%	–
Social Credit	William Patterson	1,731	30.36%	-21.90%
Liberal	Raymond Mills	723	12.68%	-21.08%
New Democratic	Swen Symington	674	11.82%	-2.14%
Total		5,701	–	–
Rejected, spoiled and declined		42	–	–
Eligible electors / turnout		8,179	70.22%	4.84%
Progressive Conservative gain from Social Credit		Swing		-1.87%
Source(s) Source: "Lac Ste. Anne Official Results 1967 Alberta general election". Alberta Heritage Community Foundation.

== Plebiscite results ==
=== 1957 liquor plebiscite ===
1957 Alberta liquor plebiscite results: Lac Ste. Anne
Question A: Do you approve additional types of outlets for the sale of beer, wine and spirituous liquor subject to a local vote?
Ballot choice	Votes	%
Yes	1,507	70.16%
No	641	29.84%
Total votes	1,601	100%
Rejected, spoiled and declined	54	
6,482 eligible electors, turnout 33.97%

On October 30, 1957, a stand-alone plebiscite was held province wide in all 50 of the then current provincial electoral districts in Alberta. The government decided to consult Alberta voters to decide on liquor sales and mixed drinking after a divisive debate in the legislature. The plebiscite was intended to deal with the growing demand for reforming antiquated liquor control laws.

The plebiscite was conducted in two parts. Question A, asked in all districts, asked the voters if the sale of liquor should be expanded in Alberta, while Question B, asked in a handful of districts within the corporate limits of Calgary and Edmonton, asked if men and women should be allowed to drink together in establishments.

Province wide Question A of the plebiscite passed in 33 of the 50 districts while Question B passed in all five districts. Lac Ste. Anne voted in favour of the proposal with a landslide majority. Voter turnout in the district was poor, as it fell significantly below the province wide average of 46%.

Official district returns were released to the public on December 31, 1957. The Social Credit government in power at the time did not consider the results binding. However the results of the vote led the government to repeal all existing liquor legislation and introduce an entirely new Liquor Act.

Municipal districts lying inside electoral districts that voted against the plebiscite were designated Local Option Zones by the Alberta Liquor Control Board and considered effective dry zones. Business owners who wanted a licence had to petition for a binding municipal plebiscite in order to be granted a licence.

== See also ==
- List of Alberta provincial electoral districts
- Canadian provincial electoral districts
- Lac Ste. Anne, a settlement in central Alberta
