= 1926 Alberta general election =

- June 28, 1926

60 seats in the Legislative Assembly of Alberta 31 seats were needed for a majority
- Turnout: 67%
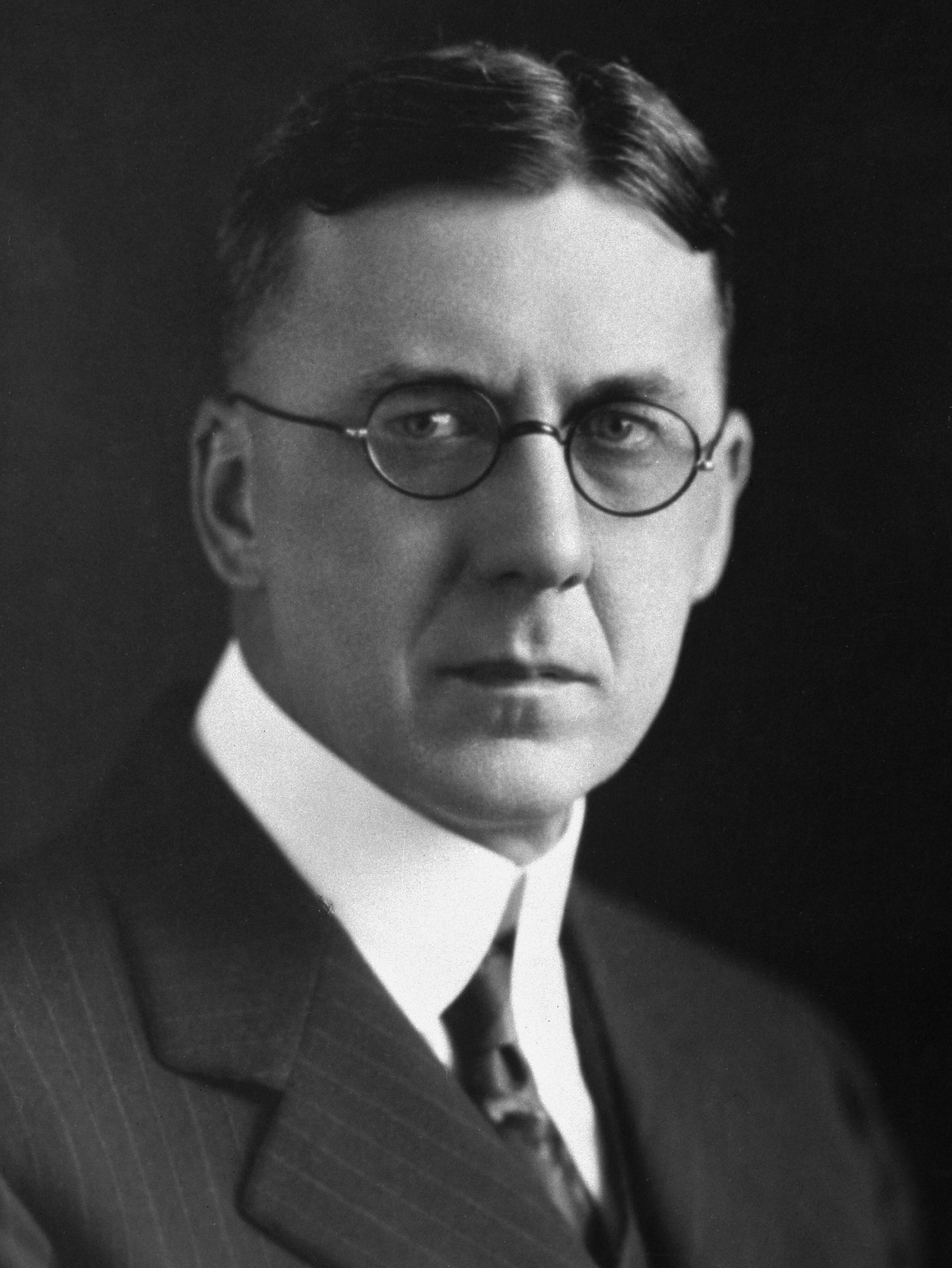

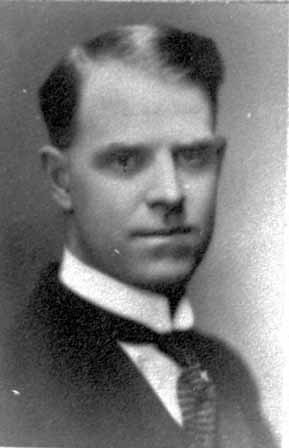

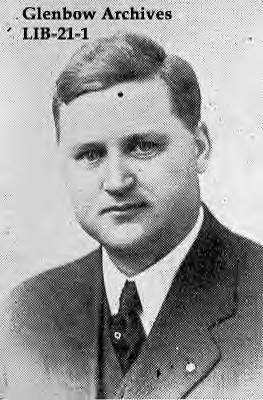

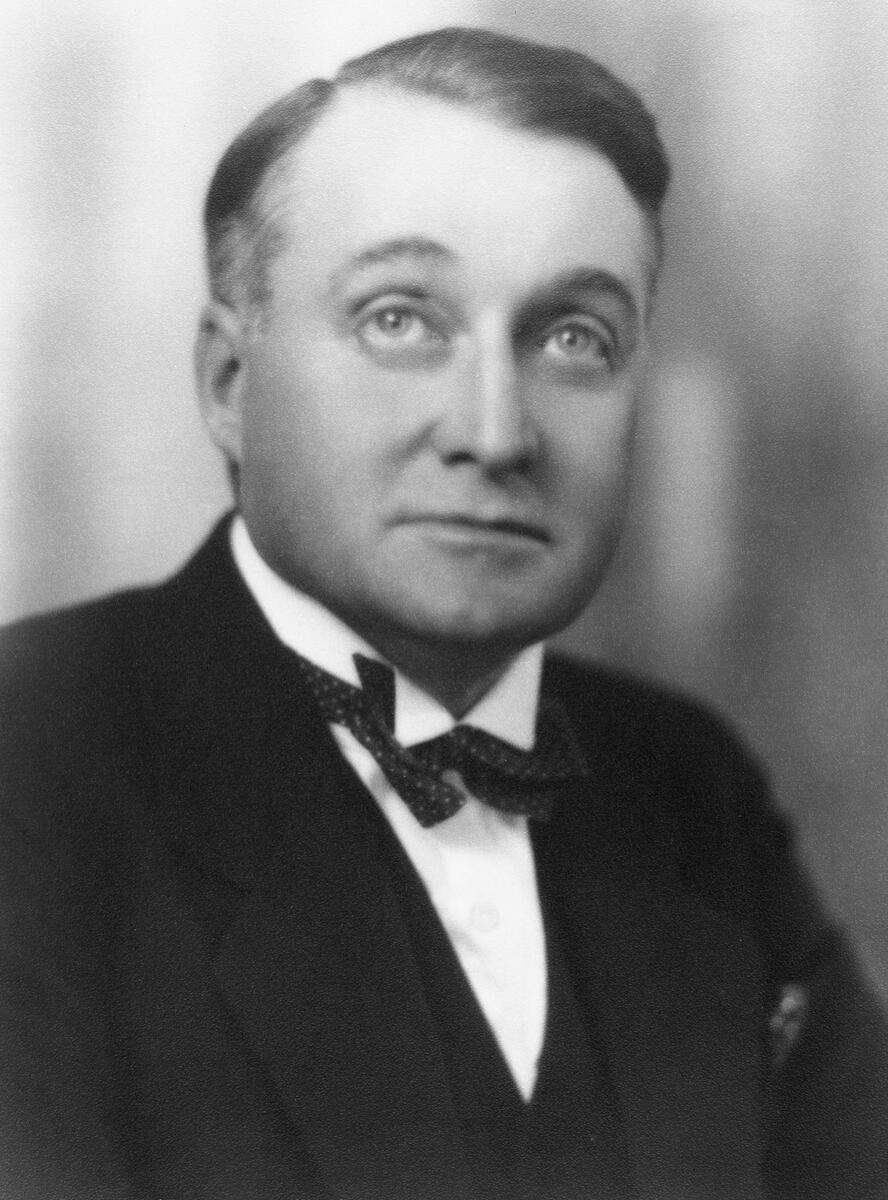
	Majority party	Minority party
Leader	John E. Brownlee	Joseph Tweed Shaw
Party	United Farmers	Liberal
Leader since	November 23, 1925	April 21, 1926
Leader's seat	Ponoka	Bow Valley
Last election	38 seats, 28.9%	15 seats, 34.1%
Seats before	40	9
Seats won	43	7
Seat change	▲3	▼2
Popular vote	71,967	47,450
Percentage	39.7%	26.2%
Swing	▲10.8%	▼7.9%
	Third party	Fourth party
Leader	Fred J. White	Alexander McGillivray
Party	Dominion Labor	Conservative
Leader since	between 1921 & 1926	1925
Leader's seat	Calgary	Calgary
Last election	4 seats, 11.4%	0 seats, 11.0%
Seats before	3	0
Seats won	5	5
Seat change	▲2	▲5
Popular vote	14,123	40,091
Percentage	7.8%	22.1%
Swing	▼3.6%	▲11.1%
Premier before election
John E. Brownlee
United Farmers
Premier after election
John E. Brownlee
United Farmers

The 1926 Alberta general election was held on June 28, 1926, to elect members of the Legislative Assembly of Alberta. The United Farmers of Alberta government that had first been elected in 1921 was re-elected, taking a majority of the seats in the Alberta Legislature. Herbert Greenfield had resigned as United Farmers leader and premier, and John E. Brownlee led the UFA to this second election victory, increasing the UFA's number of seats.

The writs of election were issued on May 10, 1926, allowing an election period of 40 days.

Alberta's first general election where Single transferable voting (STV) was used in 1926. STV was utilized in the three largest cities and Instant-runoff voting was used everywhere else.

Calgary, Edmonton and Medicine Hat continued to be multi member districts. Edmonton elected five members; Calgary elected five members; Medicine Hat elected two. Previously they had elected members by Plurality block voting. Now they elected members using STV-PR, which at the time was called the Hare Proportional representation system. The seats in each city were filled by candidates who received quota or plurality of the votes whether through first-choice votes or a combination of first-choice votes and votes transferred from less-popular candidates and from successful candidates elected with surplus votes. Each voter cast just one vote so no one group could take all the seats in a city.

Outside the large cities, districts were single member districts and MLAs were elected under the Alternative Voting system. Rural voters, like their city counterparts, cast preferential ballots and had the ability to rank the candidates. The seat was filled by the candidate who received a majority of the votes whether through first-choice votes or a combination of first-choice votes and votes transferred from less-popular candidates. This was the first election in Canada (and in North America) where all the members were elected through something other than X voting.

This dual system of voting would last until 1956. In 1926, Medicine Hat changed to a single-member constituency.

Under STV in Edmonton, the UFA captured one seat in Edmonton where it had taken no seats in 1921 under the Liberal government's Block Voting system. The Labour party also for the first time elected an MLA in Edmonton. As well, Edmonton voters elected a Liberal and two Conservatives. This mixed crop of representatives was much better balanced than the single-party sweeps that Edmonton had previously elected through other electoral systems.

The UFA also took a great share of the rural seats, taking 42 of the province's 49 rural seats. It took four rural seats that had been captured by Liberal candidates in 1921 (Beaver River, Leduc, Sedgewick and Whitford), and one that had been won by an independent in 1921 (Claresholm). The UFA also won the district of Empress, formerly known as Redcliffe, which had been won by the UFA in 1921. No UFA candidate ran for re-election to its seat in Medicine Hat. It gained a seat in the newly created next-door Cypress district. It also lost its St. Albert seat.

The UFA derived no benefit from Alternative Voting - it would have won all but one of the seats it won under Alternative Voting if the contest had been conducted using First-past-the-post voting. And it lost one seat that it would have won if the contest had been held using First-past-the-post voting, (in Bow Valley).

Conservatives, being a less popular party, had been badly treated under FPTP and Block Voting in 1921 but now did better. It won two seats each in Edmonton and Calgary, where Block Voting had been replaced by STV.

At the time of the election call, six seats were sitting vacant. They had been vacated by MLAs who had run in the 1925 federal election. MLA C.W. Cross was elected in the federal election. William McCartney Davidson, Calgary Independent MLA, was another one of those who had left.

The UFA vote share (as measured by First Preference votes) went up 10 per cent in this election compared to 1921, even if the UFA received 15,000 fewer votes in 1926 than in 1921. This shows effect of the change in voting system. Due to block voting being dropped, the overall number of votes cast decreased by 118,000 even though five thousand more voters voted in this election compared to 1921. But without each city voter being able to cast multiple votes, the number of votes cast was much fewer. For example, Liberal candidates received 54,000 fewer votes. The change in percentage of UFA support resulted from urban voters not being allowed to cast multiple voters as they had done in 1921. That had artificially raised the Liberal vote count and percentage and had lowered the UFA percentage recorded for the 1921 election.

In 1926, the UFA vote count outside the cities was 69,000, having gone down from the 81,000 the party's candidates had received outside the cities in 1921. The UFA's received about half of the first-preference votes cast outside the cities, and was the secondary choice of many voters who cast their first preference a candidate of another party. In each of the 42 districts where the UFA candidate won, he or she received either a majority of first preference votes or a majority that was composed of both first preference votes and transferred votes.

Under STV, Edmonton elected a mixed bag of representatives. UFA, Liberal, Conservative, and Labour MLAs were all elected, which compared well with the Liberals' total sweep of Edmonton seats in 1921 under Block Voting.

In Calgary, Conservative supporters found representation under STV, while they had been shut out under block voting in 1921.

Under Alternative Voting outside the cities, if no candidate took a majority of votes in the first count, votes were transferred until a candidate acceptable to a majority of the voters was determined. In Bow Valley the UFA candidate leading in the first count did not have as much support from Conservative supporters as the Liberal candidate so when the Conservative votes were transferred, a Liberal took the seat.

In four districts, only two candidates ran so vote transfers were not needed. But elsewhere three-way contests were the rule. three-cornered contests would be a feature of most elections from here on in, as Canada had passed the point when only two parties dominated politics. Labour and farmer parties were here to stay to fight it out against the two old-line parties.

In 15 of the province's 49 rural districts, three or more candidates ran and vote-splitting meant no one candidate took a majority of the votes on the first count. A UFA candidate was in the top spot in most of these contests. Liberal and Conservative party supporters were split on whether to support the other old-line party or the UFA, if their candidate was eliminated and their ballots able to be transferred to another. In many cases many Conservative and Liberal back-up preferences were marked for the UFA candidate, and in eight of those 15 districts the UFA candidate who had been leading in the first count won the seat, in three the Liberal leading was elected in the end, and in two the Labour candidate was leading and elected in the end.

The only turn-overs where the candidate leading in the first count was not elected happened in Bow Valley and Pincher Creek. In Pincher Creek, back-up preferences on votes at first placed on the Conservative candidate favoured the UFA candidate, who took the seat over the previously leading Liberal candidate. In Bow Valley, vote transfers from the Conservative candidate went mostly to the Liberal, who passed the UFA candidate in popularity. Overall party-wise the two turn-overs cancelled each other but two different individuals were elected due to the Alternative Voting system than would have been elected under FPTP.

The UFA's seat majority was due to its victories in the rural areas. Its moral right to power rested on the fact that to be elected in a rural district a candidate had to have support from a majority of a district's voters. The UFA was elected through majority support in 42 of the province's 52 districts, and its candidate in Edmonton was the most popular of all the candidates who ran there as well.

== Redistribution of districts ==
Upon the death of Joseph State, Clearwater was abolished in 1924, with parts of it distributed to Pembina, Lac Ste. Anne, Edson and Peace River.

An Act passed in 1926, after the election, made changes to the following ridings:

- Cypress was carved out from Medicine Hat, and the latter was reduced to returning one MLA.
- Redcliff was renamed as Empress.

The net effect was to reduce the size of the Assembly from 61 to 60 MLAs.

== Results ==
Elections to the 6th Alberta Legislative Assembly (1926)
Party	Leader	Candidates	First-preference votes (Note: Vote comparisons not given with 1921, as previous voting system had skewed results from multiple votes recorded in Calgary, Edmonton and Medicine Hat.)			Seats		
Party	Leader	Candidates	Votes	±	% Fpv	1921	1926	±
United Farmers	John E. Brownlee	46	71,967	39.68	10.76▲	38	43 / 60	5▲
Liberal	Joseph Tweed Shaw	54	47,450	26.17	7.90▼	15	7 / 60	8▼
Dominion Labor	Fred J. White	12	14,123	7.79	3.25▼	4	5 / 60	1▲
Conservative	Alexander McGillivray	56	40,091	22.10	11.12▲	–	4 / 60	4▲
Independent Labour		1	2,467	1.37	1.69▼	–	1 / 60	1▲
Independent		3	1,254	0.70	8.96▼	4	0 / 60	4▼
Independent Liberal		5	2,728	1.51	1.02▲			
Independent Farmer		5	999	0.55	New			
Liberal–Progressive		1	252	0.13	New			
Total		183	175,137	100.00				
Rejected ballots			8,855					
Turnout			183,992	67.2%				
Registered voters			273,750					

== MLAs elected ==
Acadia: Lorne Proudfoot
Alexandra: Peter Enzenauer
Athabasca: John Frame
Beaver River: John Delisle
Bow Valley: Joseph Shaw
Calgary: John Irwin
Calgary: Alexander McGillivray
Calgary: Robert Parkyn (I-Lab)
Calgary: George Harry Webster
Calgary:Fred J. White
Camrose: Vernor Smith
Cardston: George Stringam
Claresholm: Gordon Walker
Cochrane: Robert McCool
Coronation: George Johnston
Cypress: Perren Baker
Didsbury: Austin Claypool
Edmonton: David Milwyn Duggan
Edmonton: Charles Gibbs
Edmonton: John Lymburn
Edmonton: Warren Prevey
Edmonton: Charles Weaver
Edson: Christopher Pattinson
Empress: William Smith
Gleichen: John Buckley
Grouard: Leonidas Giroux
Hand Hills: Gordon Forster
High River: Samuel Brown
Innisfail: Donald Cameron
Lac Ste. Anne: Charles McKeen
Lacombe: Irene Parlby
Leduc: Douglas Breton
Lethbridge: Andrew Smeaton
Little Bow: Oran McPherson
Macleod: William Shield
Medicine Hat: Charles Pingle
Nanton: Daniel Harcourt Galbraith
Okotoks: George Hoadley
Olds: Nelson Smith
Peace River: Hugh Allen
Pembina: George MacLachlan
Pincher Creek: Earle Cook (Note: The only instance in this election where a candidate who led in the first count was not elected in a second round count.)
Ponoka: John Brownlee
Red Deer: George Wilbert Smith
Ribstone: William Farquharson
Rocky Mountain: Philip Christophers
St. Albert: Lucien Boudreau
St. Paul: Laudas Joly
Sedgewick: Albert Andrews
Stettler: Albert Sanders
Stony Plain: Willard Washburn
Sturgeon: Samuel Carson
Taber: Lawrence Peterson
Vegreville: Archie Matheson
Vermilion: Richard Reid
Victoria: Rudolph Hennig
Wainwright: John Russell Love
Warner: Maurice Conner
Wetaskiwin: Evert Sparks
Whitford: George Mihalcheon

=== Synopsis of results ===
Results by riding – 1926 Alberta general election (all except Calgary and Edmonton)
Riding	First-preference votes								Turnout (Note: including spoilt ballots)	Final counts					Winning party	
Name	UFA	Lib	Con	Lab	I-Lib	I-Farm	L-P	Total	Turnout	UFA	Lib	Con	Lab	I-Lib	1921	1926
Acadia	2,056	402	627	–	–	–	–	3,085	76.5%	Elected on 1st count					UFA	UFA
Alexandra	1,653	253	421	–	–	–	–	2,327	66.0%	Elected on 1st count					UFA	UFA
Athabasca	295	373	245	–	221	–	–	1,134	68.3%	363	451	–	–	–	Lib	Lib
Beaver River	1,168	989	–	–	–	–	–	2,157	64.0%	Elected on 1st count					Lib	UFA
Bow Valley	869	847	641	–	–	–	–	2,357	67.9%	1,047	1,048	–	–	–	Lib	Lib
Camrose	2,872	567	300	–	–	–	252	3,991	58.3%	Elected on 1st count					UFA	UFA
Cardston	1,328	598	480	–	–	–	–	2,406	77.4%	Elected on 1st count					UFA	UFA
Claresholm	939	–	422	–	–	–	–	1,361	75.1%	Elected on 1st count					Ind	UFA
Cochrane	883	597	385	–	–	–	–	1,865	75.6%	1,013	673	–	–	–	UFA	UFA
Coronation	2,387	945	498	–	–	–	–	3,830	79.3%	Elected on 1st count					UFA	UFA
Cypress	1,220	741	175	–	–	–	–	2,136	73.7%	Elected on 1st count					New	UFA
Didsbury	2,292	895	819	–	–	–	–	4,006	61.3%	Elected on 1st count					UFA	UFA
Edson	–	702	963	1,116	–	–	–	2,781	58.5%	–	–	1,139	1,219	–	Lib	Lab
Empress	922	464	189	–	–	–	–	1,575	77.7%	Elected on 1st count					UFA	UFA
Gleichen	1,584	478	722	–	–	–	–	2,784	66.6%	Elected on 1st count					UFA	UFA
Grouard	–	1,224	407	–	–	–	–	1,631	67.5%	Elected on 1st count					Lib	Lib
Hand Hills	2,665	778	590	–	–	–	–	4,033	69.0%	Elected on 1st count					UFA	UFA
High River	1,137	271	541	–	–	–	–	1,949	71.6%	Elected on 1st count					UFA	UFA
Innisfail	1,187	844	534	–	–	–	–	2,565	71.8%	1,327	1,063	–	–	–	UFA	UFA
Lac Ste. Anne	1,757	239	492	–	–	–	–	2,488	67.0%	Elected on 1st count					UFA	UFA
Lacombe	1,891	1,162	476	–	–	–	–	3,529	74.6%	Elected on 1st count					UFA	UFA
Leduc	1,961	1,561	823	–	–	–	–	4,345	72.2%	2,334	1,669	–	–	–	Lib	UFA
Lethbridge	–	1,225	1,459	1,584	–	–	–	4,268	71.5%	–	–	1,713	1,962	–	Ind	Lab
Little Bow	1,367	556	475	–	–	–	–	2,398	77.9%	Elected on 1st count					UFA	UFA
Macleod	656	567	125	–	–	–	–	1,348	79.4%	709	600	–	–	–	UFA	UFA
Medicine Hat	–	1,574	1,279	718	–	–	–	3,571	72.3%	–	1,701	1,487	–	–		Lib + C
Nanton	745	204	341	–	–	–	–	1,290	75.1%	Elected on 1st count					UFA	UFA
Okotoks	920	–	850	–	–	–	–	1,770	80.1%	Elected on 1st count					UFA	UFA
Olds	1,613	708	369	–	–	–	–	2,690	70.3%	Elected on 1st count					UFA	UFA
Peace River	2,548	1,131	965	–	–	–	–	4,644	70.9%	Elected on 1st count					UFA	UFA
Pembina	1,930	886	427	–	–	–	–	3,243	75.1%	Elected on 1st count					UFA	UFA
Pincher Creek	542	592	471	–	–	–	–	1,605	87.9%	720	688	–	–	–	UFA	UFA
Ponoka	1,357	453	347	–	–	–	–	2,157	67.3%	Elected on 1st count					UFA	UFA
Red Deer	1,450	621	1,329	–	–	–	–	3,400	70.5%	1,641	–	1,524	–	–	UFA	UFA
Ribstone	1,524	622	284	–	–	–	–	2,430	70.2%	Elected on 1st count					UFA	UFA
Rocky Mountain	–	786	801	1,765	–	–	–	3,352	64.7%	Elected on 1st count					Lab	Lab
St. Albert	628	1,058	85	–	683	–	–	2,454	84.4%	–	1,174	–	–	883	UFA	Lib
St. Paul	1,453	603	–	–	–	105	–	2,161	72.0%	Elected on 1st count					UFA	UFA
Sedgewick	2,264	694	468	–	–	–	–	3,426	70.6%	Elected on 1st count					Lib	UFA
Stettler	2,122	837	921	–	–	–	–	3,880	72.1%	Elected on 1st count					UFA	UFA
Stony Plain	759	368	414	–	323	–	–	1,864	69.0%	938	–	485	–	–	UFA	UFA
Sturgeon	2,605	1,154	348	–	–	–	–	4,107	70.0%	Elected on 1st count					UFA	UFA
Taber	1,929	709	551	–	–	–	–	3,189	65.4%	Elected on 1st count					UFA	UFA
Vegreville	1,986	1,395	687	–	–	337	–	4,405	71.1%	2,217	1,702	–	–	–	UFA	UFA
Vermilion	1,981	492	592	–	–	–	–	3,065	67.5%	Elected on 1st count					UFA	UFA
Victoria	1,404	1,185	90	–	322	96	–	3,097	70.0%	1,476	1,243	–	–	–	UFA	UFA
Wainwright	1,609	–	1,017	–	–	–	–	2,626	71.0%	Elected on 1st count					UFA	UFA
Warner	741	225	190	–	–	–	–	1,156	76.4%	Elected on 1st count					UFA	UFA
Wetaskiwin	1,274	1,198	288	–	–	–	–	2,760	80.1%	1,418	1,266	–	–	–	UFA	UFA
Whitford	1,449	371	274	–	–	461 (Note: Andrew Shandro had won as the Liberal candidate in 1921, but the election was subsequently voided by the court. He would lose the subsequent 1922 byelection to the UFA candidate Mike Chornohus. In 1926, he received 373 votes.)	–	2,555	63.7%	Elected on 1st count					Lib	UFA

= Open seat
= turnout is above provincial average
= Candidate was in previous Legislature
= Incumbent had switched allegiance
= Previously incumbent in another riding
= Not incumbent; was previously elected to the Legislature
= Incumbency arose from by-election gain
= previously an MP in the House of Commons of Canada
= Multiple candidates

=== Multi-member districts ===
District	Seats won (L to R in order declared)	
Calgary	DLP	Ind
Edmonton		

UFA
Liberal
Conservative
Labour (Dominion Labour Party)

= Candidate was in previous Legislature
= First-time MLA
= Previously incumbent in another district.

Also Medicine Hat elected two MLAs - Liberal Pingle (incumbent) and Conservative Hendricks

== STV vote analysis ==
=== Calgary ===
Five to be elected, Quota 3290 (Droop quota)

Calgary (1926 Alberta general election)
Party	Candidate	FPv%	Count								
Party	Candidate	FPv%	1	2	3	4	5	6	7	8	9
Conservative	Alexander McGillivray	30.04%	5,928	3,290							
Liberal	George Webster	14.90%	2,941	3,144	3,158	3,191	3,523	3,523	3,290		
Independent Labour	Robert Parkyn	12.50%	2,467	2,506	2,514	2,554	2,582	2,583	2,595	2,664	2,852
Liberal	Nellie McClung	9.77%	1,928	1,971	1,975	1,980	2,191	2,193	2,363	2,433	2,622
Conservative	John Irwin	8.42%	1,662	3,334	3,334	3,334	3,334	3,290			
Dominion Labour	Alex Ross	6.41%	1,265	1,282	1,298	1,419	1,444	1,445	1,454		
Dominion Labour	Fred J. White	6.19%	1,222	1,247	1,248	1,467	1,478	1,479	1,500	2,676	2,923
Conservative	Michael Costello	6.19%	1,221	1,817	1,827	1,838	1,864	1,903	1,924	1,946	
Liberal	Robert Marshall	3.17%	626	651	651	654					
Dominion Labour	John Russell	2.14%	423	435	438						
Independent	Frederick Potts	0.27%	54	60							
Electorate: 34,287 Valid: 19,737 Spoilt: 644 Quota: 3,290 Turnout: 53.82

Calgary (1926 Alberta general election) (analysis of transferred votes, candidates ranked in order of 1st preference)
Party	Candidate	Maximum round	Maximum votes	Share in maximum round	Maximum votes First round votes Transfer votes
Conservative	Alexander McGillivray	1	5,928	30.03%	
Liberal	George Webster	6	3,523	17.88%	
Independent Labor	Robert Parkyn	9	2,852	15.61%	
Liberal	Nellie McClung	9	2,622	14.35%	
Conservative	John Irwin	2	3,334	16.92%	
Dominion Labor	Alex Ross	7	1,454	7.38%	
Dominion Labor	Fred J. White	9	2,923	16.00%	
Conservative	Michael Costello	8	1,946	9.93%	
Liberal	Robert Marshall	4	654	3.32%	
Dominion Labor	John Russell	3	438	2.22%	
Independent	Frederick Potts	2	60	0.30%	
Exhausted votes			1,470	7.45%	

Initial terminal transfer rates for votes (1926)
Transferred from	Non-transferrable	% transferred to					Total
Transferred from	Non-transferrable	Conservative	Liberal	Ind-Lab	Dom-Lab	Ind	Total
█ Conservative (McGillivray)	–	2,268	271	39	54	6	2,638
█ Conservative (McGillivray)	–	85.97%	10.27%	1.48%	2.05%	0.23%	100.00%
█ Dominion Labor (Ross)	117	22	70	69	1,176	–	1,454
█ Dominion Labor (Ross)	8.05%	1.51%	4.81%	4.75%	80.88%	–	100.00%

=== Edmonton ===
1 UFA, 1 Liberal, 2 Conservatives and 1 Labour MLA were elected. Lymburn, Weaver, Gibbs, Prevey and Duggan were elected.

18,154 valid votes Five to be elected Quota: 3026

First Count tallies

Lymburn (UFA) 3046 declared elected in 1st Count

Weaver (Conservative) 2202 declared elected in 11th Count

Prevey (Liberal) 1517 declared elected after 16th Count

Clarke (Ind-Liberal) 1179

Bowen (Liberal) 1147

Barnes (Independent) 1060

Farmilo (Labour) 973

Follinsbee (Conservative) 881

Gibbs (Labour) 879 declared elected in 15th Count

Henry (Liberal) 858

Duggan (Conservative) 857 declared elected after 16th Count

Crawford (Conservative) 782

Findlay (Labour) 628

Lakeman (Labour) 605

Rea (Liberal) 561

Roper (Labour) 478

Robertson (Conservative) 361

Leedy (Independent) 140

The vote count went like this:

1st Count Lymburn achieved quota and was declared elected. His surplus was so small it was not immediately transferred.

Leedy, Roper, Rea, Lakeman, Crawford, Findlay. Henry, Follinsbee, Barnes were eliminated, in turn. Transfer of Barnes' votes put Weaver over quota, and he was declared elected on the 11th Count. Lakeman's transfers went more to Gibbs than to Farmilo and Gibbs overtook Farmilo. That is why later Farmilo was eliminated and not Gibbs, even though Gibbs had started out with fewer votes than Farmilo.

Lymburn's surplus was transferred at this point, then Weaver's was also.

Clarke and Farmilo were eliminated. Farmilo's transfers put Gibbs over quota, and he was declared elected. This left just Bowen, Prevey and Duggan still standing, with two open seats remaining. Of the three, Prevey and Duggan were more popular than Bowen.

Gibbs' surplus was transferred. It did not change the relative standing of the three remaining candidates.

Bowen was declared defeated. Prevey and Duggan were declared elected despite not having quota.

Lymburn, Weaver, Gibbs, Prevey and Duggan were elected in the end.

Reports on the Edmonton count concentrate on the activity from the 11th count onwards.

Edmonton (1926 Alberta general election) (analysis of transferred votes, candidates listed in order of 11th Count vote tallies, listing only those remaining from the 11th count onwards)
Party	Candidate	Maximum round	Maximum votes	Share in maximum round	Maximum votes First round votes Transfer votes
United Farmers	John Lymburn	1 (elected)	3,044	16.77%	
Conservative	Charles Yardley Weaver	11 (elected)	3,065	17.32%	
Liberal	Warren Prevey	16 (elected)	2,940	17.81%	
Labour	Lionel Gibbs	15 (elected)	3,543	21.06%	
Conservative	David Duggan	16 (elected)	2,265	13.72%	
Liberal	John C. Bowen	16	2,212	13.46%	
Labour	Alfred Farmilo	14	1,891	10.94%	
Independent Liberal	Joseph Clarke	13	1,596	9.03%	
Exhausted votes			1,659	9.08%	

Initial terminal transfer rates for votes (1926)
Transferred from	Non-transferrable	% transferred to			Total
Transferred from	Non-transferrable	Conservative	Liberal	Labour	Total
█ Independent Liberal (Clarke)	392	185	449	570	1,596
█ Independent Liberal (Clarke)	24.56%	11.59%	28.13%	35.71%	100.00%
█ Labour (Farmilo)	461	74	166	1,190	1,891
█ Labour (Farmilo)	24.38%	3.91%	8.78%	62.93%	100.00%

== See also ==
- List of Alberta political parties
