= John Mackintosh (Canadian politician) =

Canadian politician

Member of the Legislative Assembly of Alberta
- In office June 19, 1930 – August 22, 1935
- Preceded by: Joseph Shaw
- Succeeded by: Wilson Cain
- Constituency: Bow Valley

Personal details
- Born: January 6, 1890 Partick, Scotland
- Died: May 8, 1963 (aged 73) Calgary, Alberta
- Party: Independent
- Occupation: politician

John Mackintosh (1890–1963) was a Canadian provincial politician from Alberta. He served as a member of the Legislative Assembly of Alberta as an independent from 1930 to 1935. Previously he was mayor of Brooks, and from 1952 to 1958 was the first mayor of the newly established town of Bowness.

== Early life ==
Mackintosh was born in Partick, Scotland in 1892 to James MacKintosh and Margaret Ross, and came to Canada in 1910, settling first in Lethbridge. Mackintosh served in the First World War with the Canadian Expeditionary Force 113th Battalion. In 1919 he moved to Brooks, where he served as mayor for two years. He had a daughter, Hazel, and a son, Alex.

== Political career ==
Mackintosh ran for a seat to the Alberta Legislature in the 1930 Alberta general election as an Independent candidate, running in the electoral district of Bow Valley. He defeated United Farmers candidate L.P. Schooling in a two-way race by a wide margin to win the district.

Mackintosh ran for a second term in office in the 1935 Alberta general election. He was defeated by Social Credit candidate Wilson Cain finishing a distant fourth place in the four-way race.

== Later life ==
In 1940, Mackintosh moved to Bowness, and bought 24 acres of land west of the Shouldice Bridge in the area then known as Critchley. He relocated his business, Western Nurseries, from Brooks to Bowness but had difficulty at first because of the lack of water, electricity or gas. He supported the establishment of Bowness as a town and was elected mayor of the first Bowness Town Council in 1952, serving until 1958. As mayor, Mackintosh lobbied the provincial government for a catchbasin to prevent flooding (there was a bad flood in Bowness on New Year's Eve 1951), and for a school, which was named Bowcroft School.

Mackintosh died on May 8, 1963, at Calgary General Hospital at the age of 73.

In 2011, a park at 37 Avenue and 76 Street in Bowness was named Mackintosh Park in his honour.
