= William Delday =

Canadian politician (1913–1979)

Member of the Legislative Assembly of Alberta
- In office June 18, 1959 – May 23, 1967
- Preceded by: Bryce Stringam
- Succeeded by: Fred Mandeville
- Constituency: Bow Valley-Empress

Personal details
- Born: July 25, 1913 Foxwarren, Manitoba
- Died: December 11, 1979 (aged 66)
- Party: Social Credit
- Occupation: politician

William Delday (July 25, 1913 – December 11, 1979) was a politician from Alberta, Canada. He served in the Legislative Assembly of Alberta from 1959 to 1967 as a member of the Social Credit caucus in government.

== Political career ==
Delday first ran for a seat in the Alberta Legislature in the 1959 general election. He stood as the Social Credit candidate in the electoral district of Bow Valley-Empress. He defeated incumbent MLA Bryce Stringam by a comfortable majority to pick up the seat for his party.

In the 1963 general election Delday won a three-way race with a large majority.

Delday retired from the Assembly at dissolution in 1967.
