= Wilson Cain =

Canadian politician

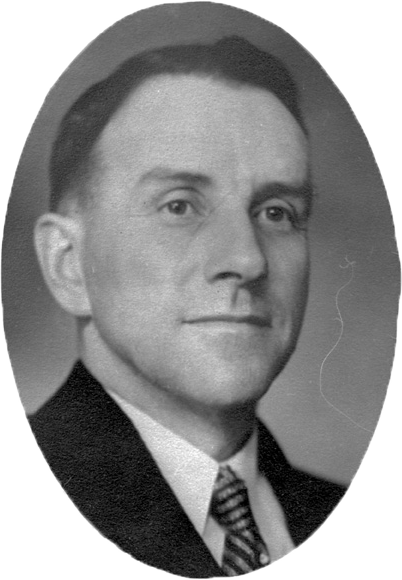

Member of the Legislative Assembly of Alberta
- In office 1935–1955
- Preceded by: John Mackintosh
- Succeeded by: Bryce Stringam
- Constituency: Bow Valley (1935–40); Bow Valley-Empress (1940–55)

Personal details
- Born: April 12, 1887 Perth, Ontario
- Died: June 26, 1969 (aged 82) Armstrong, British Columbia
- Party: Social Credit

Wilson Edwin Cain (April 12, 1887 – June 26, 1969) was a provincial politician from Alberta, Canada. He served as a member of the Legislative Assembly of Alberta from 1935 to 1955, sitting with the Social Credit caucus in government.
