= Empress (provincial electoral district) =

Defunct provincial electoral district in Alberta, Canada

Alberta electoral district

Defunct provincial electoral district
- Legislature: Legislative Assembly of Alberta
- District created: 1926
- District abolished: 1939
- First contested: 1926
- Last contested: 1935

Empress was a provincial electoral district in Alberta, Canada, mandated to return a single member to the Legislative Assembly of Alberta from 1926 to 1940.

== History ==
The Empress electoral district was created prior to the 1926 Alberta general election, constituting the boundaries of the former Redcliff electoral district.

The electoral district was named for the village of Empress, Alberta.

From 1924 to 1939, the district used instant-runoff voting to elect its MLA.

The Empress electoral district merged with Bow Valley in the 1939 boundary redistribution to form Bow Valley-Empress.

=== Members of the Legislative Assembly (MLAs) ===
Members of the Legislative Assembly for Empress
Assembly	Years	Member	Party
See Redcliff electoral district from 1913-1926
6th	1926–1930	William C. Smith	United Farmers
7th	1930–1935	William C. Smith	United Farmers
8th	1935–1940	David Lush	Social Credit
See Bow Valley-Empress electoral district from 1940-1971

== Election results ==
=== 1926 ===
1926 Alberta general election
Party	Candidate	Votes	%	±%
United Farmers	William C. Smith	922	58.54%	–
Liberal	D. McEachern	464	29.46%	–
Conservative	D. MacCrimmon	189	12.00%	–
Total		1,575	–	–
Rejected, spoiled and declined		110	–	–
Eligible electors / turnout		2,169	77.69%	–
Source(s) Source: "Empress Official Results 1926 Alberta general election". Alberta Heritage Community Foundation.

=== 1930 ===
1930 Alberta general election
Party	Candidate	Votes	%	±%
United Farmers	William C. Smith	941	60.40%	1.86%
Independent	E. A. Mantz	617	39.60%	–
Total		1,558	–	–
Rejected, spoiled and declined		54	–	–
Eligible electors / turnout		2,260	71.33%	–
United Farmers hold		Swing		-4.14%
Source(s) Source: "Empress Official Results 1930 Alberta general election". Alberta Heritage Community Foundation.

=== 1935 ===
1935 Alberta general election
Party	Candidate	Votes	%	±%
Social Credit	David Lush	1,453	72.07%	–
United Farmers	William C. Smith	324	16.07%	-44.33%
Liberal	K. A. Pollock	239	11.86%	–
Total		2,016	–	–
Rejected, spoiled and declined		45	–	–
Eligible electors / turnout		2,440	84.47%	–
Social Credit gain from United Farmers		Swing		17.60%
Source(s) Source: "Empress Official Results 1935 Alberta general election". Alberta Heritage Community Foundation.

== See also ==
- List of Alberta provincial electoral districts
- Canadian provincial electoral districts
