= Charles O. Wright =

Canadian politician

Charles O. F. Wright

Member of the Legislative Assembly of Alberta
- In office July 18, 1921 – March 28, 1922
- Preceded by: James Turgeon
- Succeeded by: William Farquharson
- Constituency: Ribstone

Personal details
- Born: April 13, 1873
- Died: March 28, 1922 (aged 48) Edmonton, Alberta
- Party: United Farmers
- Occupation: Politician

Charles Orson F. Wright (April 13, 1873 – March 28, 1922) was a Canadian provincial politician from Alberta. He served as a member of the Legislative Assembly of Alberta from 1921 to his death in 1922 sitting with the United Farmers caucus in government.

== Political career ==
Wright ran for a seat to the Albert Legislature in the 1921 Alberta general election as a United Farmers candidate. He defeated incumbent James Turgeon to pick up the Ribstone electoral district for his party.

Wright died on March 28, 1922, after suffering from pneumonia at Royal Alexandra Hospital in Edmonton, Alberta. He was Charles Stewart's brother in law.
