= Peter Gunn (politician) =

Canadian politician (1864–1927)

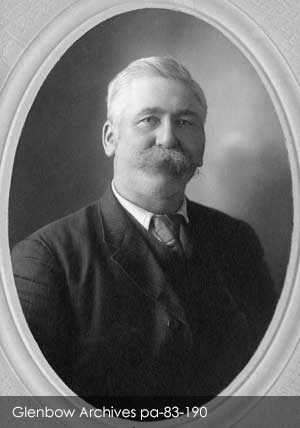

Member of the Legislative Assembly of Alberta
- In office March 22, 1909 – June 14, 1916
- Preceded by: New district
- Succeeded by: George R. Barker
- Constituency: Lac Ste. Anne

Personal details
- Born: February 9, 1864 Thurso, Caithness, Scotland
- Died: June 22, 1927 (aged 63) Alberta
- Party: Liberal

Peter Gunn (9 February 1864 – 22 June 1927) was a politician from Alberta, Canada.

== Biography ==
Gunn was born in Thurso, Caithness, Scotland in 1862. He arrived in Canada on February 26, 1883 at the age of 21 under the employment of the Hudson's Bay Company and went first to Fort St. John. The next five years of his life were spent between Fort St. John and Dunvegan. In 1888 he was moved to Grouard, Alberta. From there in 1900 Peter went to Lac Ste. Anne, his last post as a Hudson Bay Factor. He remained there for 9 years. He ran for election as a Liberal to the Legislative Assembly of Alberta in the 1909 Alberta general election. With no other opposition candidates he was acclaimed to his first term in office and attended some of the first sittings of Parliament after the province was formed. He ran for his second term in the 1913 Alberta general election, this time defeating Conservative candidate George R. Barker in a hotly contested race. Gunn won the election by a 43-vote margin. He did not run again in the next provincial election. He was later appointed fisheries inspector to the Dominion Government. As he had mastered the Cree Language he was frequently called into court as an interpreter. He was appointed Sheriff of Edmonton in 1916. Gunn died in Alberta in 1927.

== Legacy ==
The hamlet of Gunn, Alberta on Lac Ste. Anne is named in his honor.

Peter Gunn's fonds are held by the Provincial Archive of Alberta.

Legislative Assembly of Alberta
Preceded by New District	MLA Lac Ste. Anne; 1909–1917	Succeeded by George R. Barker
