= Charles McKeen =

Canadian politician (1885–1972)

Charles Milton McKeen
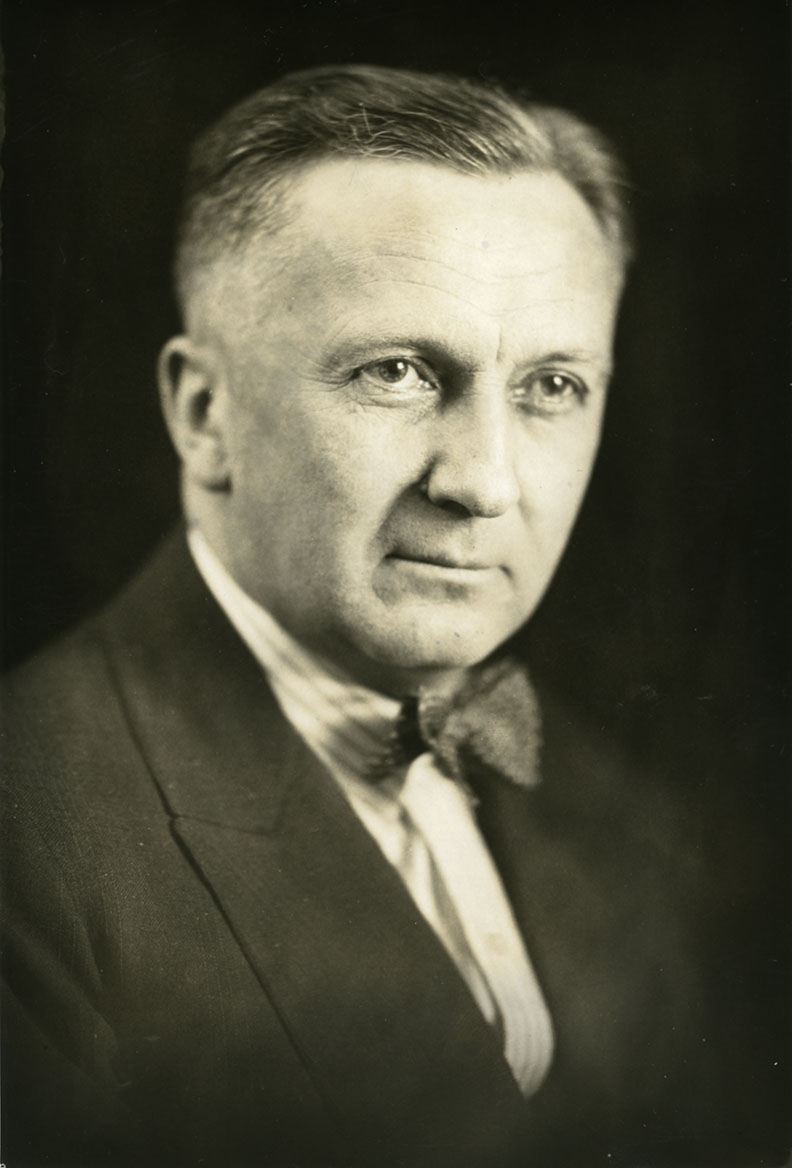

Member of the Legislative Assembly of Alberta
- In office July 18, 1921 – August 22, 1935
- Preceded by: George Barker
- Succeeded by: Albert Bourcier
- Constituency: Lac Ste. Anne

Personal details
- Born: May 10, 1885 Fredericton, New Brunswick
- Died: November 7, 1972 (aged 87) Mayerthorpe, Alberta
- Party: United Farmers
- Occupation: politician

Charles Milton McKeen (May 10, 1885 – November 7, 1972) was a provincial politician from Alberta, Canada. He served as a member of the Legislative Assembly of Alberta from 1921 to 1935 sitting with the United Farmers caucus in government.

== Political career ==
McKeen ran for a seat to the Alberta Legislature in the Lac Ste. Anne electoral district as a United Farmers of Alberta candidate in the 1921 Alberta general election. He defeated two other candidates with a landslide majority (62 percent of the vote), to pick up the seat for his party on the First Count. The Alternative Voting system was in use to ensure majority representation.

McKeen ran for a second term in the 1926 Alberta general election. He faced two other candidates including former MLA George Barker. McKeen held his seat with another landslide majority, winning the seat again on the First Count. The Alternative Voting system was in use to ensure majority representation.

In the 1930 Alberta general election, McKeen was returned to office for his third term by acclamation.

McKeen ran for a fourth term in the 1935 Alberta general election, but was defeated. He came in second to Social Credit candidate Albert Bourcier. The Alternative Voting system was in use to ensure majority representation - or at least by successful candidate receiving a majority of the votes still in play. The four way race was decided on the third count, after elimination of two candidates. However, many voters did not mark enough back-up preferences and SC candidate Bourcier won without receiving a majority of cast votes but only having the majority of votes still in play by that time.

== Family life ==
Married to Bessie (nee Gunn), for whom Mount Bess is named in 1910. She was in the group that named the mountain.
