= William Farquharson (politician) =

Canadian politician

William George Farquharson
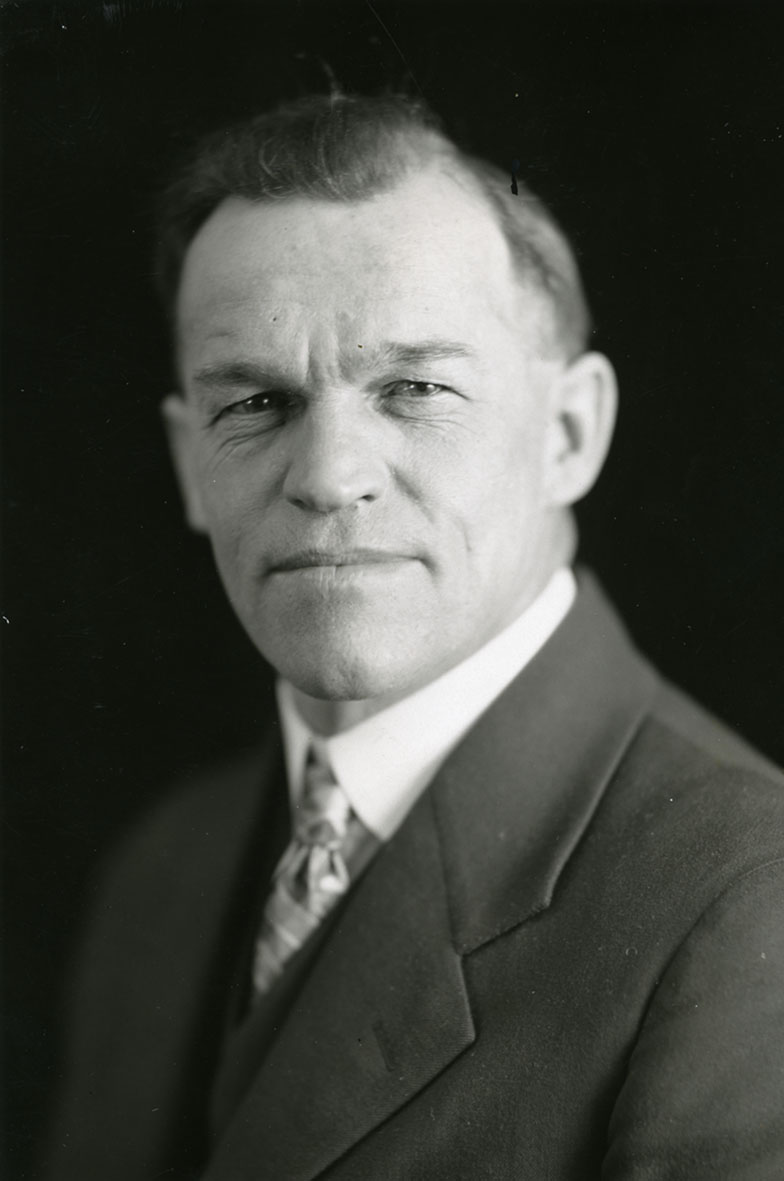

Member of the Legislative Assembly of Alberta
- In office July 10, 1922 – August 22, 1935
- Preceded by: Charles Wright
- Succeeded by: Albert Blue
- Constituency: Ribstone

Personal details
- Born: April 23, 1888 Walton, Ontario
- Died: April 13, 1950 (aged 61) Provost, Alberta
- Party: United Farmers
- Occupation: politician

William George Farquharson was a provincial politician from Alberta, Canada. He served as a member of the Legislative Assembly of Alberta from 1922 to 1935 sitting with the United Farmers caucus in government.

== Political career ==
Farquharson ran for nomination to stand as the United Farmers candidate in a by-election held in the electoral district of Ribstone. He won the nomination race which proved to be controversial because delegates at the time felt that the nomination should go to the deceased Member Charles Wright's wife who was sister to former Premier Charles Stewart.

The delegates who disagreed with the outcome of the race were dismayed because they felt that the nomination of Mrs. Wright had been railroaded to prevent her from contesting the nomination. Pundits predicted Wright might run against Farquharson as an Independent, but this never materialized.

Farquharson ran in the July 10, 1922 by-election against Liberal candidate J.J. McKenna in a straight fight. He held the district for the United Farmers with a significantly reduced popular vote, but still winning a landslide majority. Farquharson ran for a second term in the 1926 Alberta general election. He faced two other candidates and was re-elected easily despite losing some of his popular vote from the by-election. Farquharson ran for a third term in the 1930 Alberta general election. He won the largest popular vote of his career winning the three-way race easily.

The 1935 Alberta general election would see Farquharson go down to defeat. He finished a distant third place in the three-way race losing to Social Credit candidate Albert Blue.
