= Frank H. Whiteside =

Canadian politician

Frank Henry Whiteside
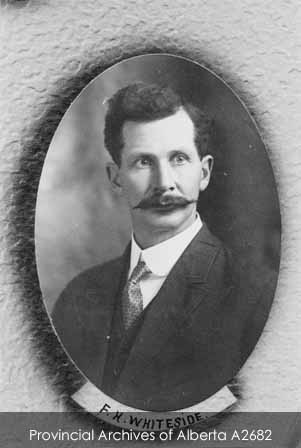

Member of the Legislative Assembly of Alberta
- In office March 25, 1913 – September 29, 1916
- Preceded by: District established
- Succeeded by: William Wallace Wilson
- Constituency: Coronation

Personal details
- Born: July 15, 1873 Ottawa, Ontario
- Died: September 29, 1916 (aged 43) Coronation, Alberta
- Party: Liberal

Frank Henry Whiteside (July 15, 1873 – September 29, 1916) was a Canadian politician and journalist from Alberta. Whiteside was killed while serving in the Legislative Assembly of Alberta in 1916.

== Early life ==
Frank Henry Whiteside was born in Ottawa, Ontario on July 15, 1873, to Henry Whiteside and Hannah L. Stone, but grew up in Sussex, New Brunswick. Whiteside earned a commercial diploma, and moved west in 1892, to British Columbia and then to the Innisfail area of Alberta in 1894.

Whiteside married his first wife Christina M. McGillivray on October 24, 1899, and together had four children together. Christina later died on August 11, 1906. Whiteside married Christina's sister Daisy B. McGillivray on January 29, 1911.

Whiteside became the president of the Central Alberta Stock Growers Association in 1906, an influential farming organization that boosted his public profile, so much that he was appointed by the provincial government to commission a report to investigate the prospects of a meat packing industry in Alberta.

Whiteside was a staunch opponent of cattle rustlers and advocated for better brands and enforcement. His advocacy was often printed in the Stettler Independent, which introduced him to the world of journalism. Whiteside founded two newspapers, Castor Advance in November 1908, and Coronation Review in September 1911. Whiteside moved to the Castor area where he published the Advance and took a role in areas throughout the community, including being elected to town council in 1911.

== Political life ==
Whiteside won the Liberal nomination in the newly formed Coronation district, despite not living in the district. Whiteside promised to move to the Town of Coronation if he won the election. Whiteside's campaign was run by his friend and future killer Thomas Helmbolt.

He was elected to the Legislative Assembly of Alberta in the 1913 Alberta general election in the Coronation defeating Conservative candidate and future MLA William Wallace Wilson. He served one term as a back bencher in the Liberal government.

Whiteside's political beliefs included active government development of roads, railways and telephones into the province's rural areas. Whiteside also supported the province gaining control of natural resources and recall.

Through his newspapers, Whiteside promoted British patriotism in the lead-up to the First World War. Whiteside promoted recruitment, Red Cross fund raising and other efforts, going so far as to publicly criticize local residents who expressed contradictory views. Whiteside volunteered for the 187th Battalion of the Canadian Expeditionary Force in 1916 along with his friend Thomas Helmbolt.

== Death ==
In September 1916, Thomas Helmbolt became aware of an affair between his wife and Frank Whiteside while training with the Canadian Expeditionary Force through letters between the two. Helmbolt returned to Coronation on September 24 and fashioned a sawed-off shotgun. At 10:30 p.m. Helmbolt called Whiteside to the telephone office and after an altercation Helmbolt shot Whiteside with the modified shotgun. Helmbolt telephoned for help and was arrested as Whiteside was taken to the hospital. Whiteside died in Coronation, Alberta on September 29, 1916, as a result of gunshot wounds.

Helmbolt was charged with murder, and tried before Justice William Carlos Ives, but was acquitted on grounds of self-defence on November 4, 1916. Before he died, Whiteside claimed that Helmbolt drew a revolver first, while Helmbolt and his wife testified that Whiteside brought the revolver and drew first.

Legislative Assembly of Alberta
Preceded by New District	MLA Coronation; 1913–1916	Succeeded by William Wallace Wilson
