= Bow Valley-Empress =

Defunct provincial electoral district in Alberta, Canada

Alberta electoral district

Defunct provincial electoral district
- Legislature: Legislative Assembly of Alberta
- District created: 1940
- District abolished: 1971
- First contested: 1940
- Last contested: 1967

Bow Valley-Empress was a provincial electoral district in Alberta, Canada, mandated to return a single member to the Legislative Assembly of Alberta from 1940 to 1971.

== History ==
Bow Valley-Empress was formed in the 1939 redistribution from Empress and Bow Valley.

The Bow Valley-Empress electoral district was dissolved in the 1970 electoral district re-distribution, and renamed Bow Valley.

Members of the Legislative Assembly for Bow Valley-Empress
Assembly	Years	Member	Party
See Bow Valley electoral district from 1913-1940 and Empress electoral district from 1926-1940
9th	1940–1944	Wilson E. Cain	Social Credit
10th	1944–1948	Wilson E. Cain	Social Credit
11th	1948–1952	Wilson E. Cain	Social Credit
12th	1952–1955	Wilson E. Cain	Social Credit
13th	1955–1959	Bryce C. Stringam	Independent
14th	1959–1963	William Delday	Social Credit
15th	1963–1967	William Delday	Social Credit
16th	1967–1971	Fred T. Mandeville	Social Credit
See Bow Valley electoral district from 1971-1997

== Election results ==
=== 1940 ===
1940 Alberta general election
Party	Candidate	Votes	%	±%
Social Credit	Wilson E. Cain	2,035	53.59%	–
Independent	E. L. Gray	1,762	46.41%	–
Total		3,797	–	–
Rejected, spoiled and declined		146	–	–
Eligible electors / turnout		5,596	70.46%	–
Social Credit pickup new district.				
Source(s) Source: "Bow Valley-Empress Official Results 1940 Alberta general election". Alberta Heritage Community Foundation.

=== 1944 ===
1944 Alberta general election
Party	Candidate	Votes	%	±%
Social Credit	Wilson E. Cain	2,131	56.24%	2.65%
Co-operative Commonwealth	John Fowlie	1,033	27.26%	–
Independent	T. S. Montgomerie	625	16.50%	-29.91%
Total		3,789	–	–
Rejected, spoiled and declined		144	–	–
Eligible electors / turnout		5,290	74.35%	3.89%
Social Credit hold		Swing		10.89%
Source(s) Source: "Bow Valley-Empress Official Results 1944 Alberta general election". Alberta Heritage Community Foundation.

=== 1948 ===
1948 Alberta general election
Party	Candidate	Votes	%	±%
Social Credit	Wilson E. Cain	2,178	55.50%	-0.74%
Liberal	Herbert G. Claxton	1,063	27.09%	–
Co-operative Commonwealth	John William McLachlan	683	17.41%	-9.86%
Total		3,924	–	–
Rejected, spoiled and declined		312	–	–
Eligible electors / turnout		6,150	68.88%	-5.47%
Social Credit hold		Swing		-0.28%
Source(s) Source: "Bow Valley-Empress Official Results 1948 Alberta general election". Alberta Heritage Community Foundation.

=== 1952 ===
1952 Alberta general election
Party	Candidate	Votes	%	±%
Social Credit	Wilson E. Cain	2,475	61.34%	5.83%
Liberal	Albert T. Johnson	1,560	38.66%	11.57%
Total		4,035	–	–
Rejected, spoiled and declined		352	–	–
Eligible electors / turnout		6,463	67.88%	-1.00%
Social Credit hold		Swing		-2.87%
Source(s) Source: "Bow Valley-Empress Official Results 1952 Alberta general election". Alberta Heritage Community Foundation.

=== 1955 ===
1955 Alberta general election
Party	Candidate	Votes	%	±%
Independent	Bryce C. Stringam	2,569	52.44%	–
Social Credit	William Delday	2,330	47.56%	-13.78%
Total		4,899	–	–
Rejected, spoiled and declined		234	–	–
Eligible electors / turnout		6,887	74.53%	6.65%
Independent gain from Social Credit		Swing		-8.90%
Source(s) Source: "Bow Valley-Empress Official Results 1955 Alberta general election". Alberta Heritage Community Foundation.

=== 1959 ===
1959 Alberta general election
Party	Candidate	Votes	%	±%
Social Credit	William Delday	2,863	56.40%	8.84%
Independent	Bryce C. Stringam	2,213	43.60%	-8.84%
Total		5,076	–	–
Rejected, spoiled and declined		4	–	–
Eligible electors / turnout		6,908	73.78%	-0.75%
Social Credit gain from Independent		Swing		3.96%
Source(s) Source: "Bow Valley-Empress Official Results 1959 Alberta general election". Alberta Heritage Community Foundation.

=== 1963 ===
1963 Alberta general election
Party	Candidate	Votes	%	±%
Social Credit	William Delday	2,871	60.24%	3.84%
Progressive Conservative	George A. Simpson	972	20.39%	–
Liberal	George Timko	923	19.37%	–
Total		4,766	–	–
Rejected, spoiled and declined		4	–	–
Eligible electors / turnout		7,088	67.30%	-6.49%
Social Credit hold		Swing		13.52%
Source(s) Source: "Bow Valley-Empress Official Results 1963 Alberta general election". Alberta Heritage Community Foundation.

=== 1967 ===
1967 Alberta general election
Party	Candidate	Votes	%	±%
Social Credit	Fred T. Mandeville	2,525	49.59%	-10.65%
Coalition	Ben M. MacLeod	2,018	39.63%	–
New Democratic	Calvin Steinley	549	10.78%	–
Total		5,092	–	–
Rejected, spoiled and declined		44	–	–
Eligible electors / turnout		6,922	74.20%	6.90%
Social Credit hold		Swing		-14.94%
Source(s) Source: "Bow Valley-Empress Official Results 1967 Alberta general election". Alberta Heritage Community Foundation.

== Plebiscite results ==
=== 1957 liquor plebiscite ===
1957 Alberta liquor plebiscite results: Bow Valley-Empress
Question A: Do you approve additional types of outlets for the sale of beer, wine and spirituous liquor subject to a local vote?
Ballot choice	Votes	%
Yes	1,818	54.86%
No	1,496	45.14%
Total votes	3,314	100%
Rejected, spoiled and declined	11	
6,341 eligible electors, turnout 52.44%

On October 30, 1957, a stand-alone plebiscite was held province wide in all 50 of the then current provincial electoral districts in Alberta. The government decided to consult Alberta voters to decide on liquor sales and mixed drinking after a divisive debate in the legislature. The plebiscite was intended to deal with the growing demand for reforming antiquated liquor control laws.

The plebiscite was conducted in two parts. Question A, asked in all districts, asked the voters if the sale of liquor should be expanded in Alberta, while Question B, asked in a handful of districts within the corporate limits of Calgary and Edmonton, asked if men and women should be allowed to drink together in establishments.

Province wide Question A of the plebiscite passed in 33 of the 50 districts while Question B passed in all five districts. Bow Valley-Empress voted in favour of the proposal by a solid margin. The district recorded one of the higher turnouts in the province, well above the province wide average of 46%.

Official district returns were released to the public on December 31, 1957. The Social Credit government in power at the time did not consider the results binding. However the results of the vote led the government to repeal all existing liquor legislation and introduce an entirely new Liquor Act.

Municipal districts lying inside electoral districts that voted against the plebiscite were designated Local Option Zones by the Alberta Liquor Control Board and considered effective dry zones. Business owners who wanted a licence had to petition for a binding municipal plebiscite in order to be granted a licence.

== See also ==
- List of Alberta provincial electoral districts
- Canadian provincial electoral districts
