= Redcliff (provincial electoral district) =

Defunct provincial electoral district in Alberta, Canada

Alberta electoral district

Defunct provincial electoral district
- Legislature: Legislative Assembly of Alberta
- District created: 1913
- District abolished: 1926
- First contested: 1913
- Last contested: 1921

Redcliff was a provincial electoral district in Alberta, Canada, mandated to return a single member to the Legislative Assembly of Alberta from 1913 to 1926.

== History ==
The Redcliff electoral district was formed before the 1913 Alberta general election from parts of the Medicine Hat, Lethbridge District, and Gleichen electoral districts. It was named after the town of Redcliff, Alberta.

The district was dissolved before the 1926 Alberta general election and became part of the new Empress electoral district.

=== Members of the Legislative Assembly (MLAs) ===
Members of the Legislative Assembly for Redcliff
Assembly	Years	Member	Party
See Medicine Hat electoral district from 1905-1913, Lethbridge District from 1909-1913 and Gleichen electoral district from 1905-1913
3rd	1913–1917	Charles S. Pingle	Liberal
4th	1917–1921	Charles S. Pingle	Liberal
5th	1921–1926	William C. Smith	United Farmers
See Empress electoral district from 1926-1940

== Electoral history ==
=== 1913 ===
1913 Alberta general election
Party	Candidate	Votes	%	±%
Liberal	Charles Pingle	645	60.11%	–
Conservative	H. S. Gerow	428	39.89%	–
Total		1,073	–	–
Rejected, spoiled and declined		N/A	–	–
Eligible electors / turnout		N/A	N/A	–
Source(s) Source: "Redcliff Official Results 1913 Alberta general election". Alberta Heritage Community Foundation.

=== 1917 ===
1917 Alberta general election
Party	Candidate	Votes	%	±%
Liberal	Charles Pingle	Acclaimed	–	–
Liberal hold		Swing		N/A
Source(s) Source: "Redcliff Official Results 1917 Alberta general election". Alberta Heritage Community Foundation. One of eleven Members of the Legislative Assembly of Alberta acclaimed under The Elections Act Section 38, which stipulated that any member of the 3rd Alberta Legislative Assembly would be guaranteed re-election, with no contest held, if the member joined for wartime service in the First World War. An Act amending The Election Act respecting Members of the Legislative Assembly on Active Service., SA 1917, c. 38

=== 1921 ===
1921 Alberta general election
Party	Candidate	Votes	%	±%
United Farmers	William C. Smith	1,950	58.44%	–
Liberal	Charles S. Pingle	1,387	41.56%	–
Total		3,337	–	–
Rejected, spoiled and declined		N/A	–	–
Eligible electors / turnout		4,385	76.10%	–
United Farmers gain from Liberal		Swing		N/A
Source(s) Source: "Redcliff Official Results 1921 Alberta general election". Alberta Heritage Community Foundation.

== See also ==
- List of Alberta provincial electoral districts
- Canadian provincial electoral districts
