= 258th (Canadien-Français) Battalion, CEF =

The 258th Battalion, CEF was a unit in the Canadian Expeditionary Force during the First World War. Based in Montreal, Quebec, the unit began recruiting in the spring of 1917 throughout the province of Quebec. After sailing to England in October 1917, the battalion was absorbed into the 10th Reserve Battalion, CEF upon arrival. The 258th Battalion, CEF had one Officer Commanding: Lieut-Col. P. E. Blondin.
