= John McColl (politician) =

Canadian politician

John Arthur McColl
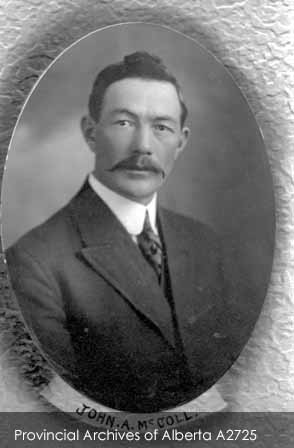

Member of the Legislative Assembly of Alberta
- In office March 25, 1913 – July 18, 1921
- Preceded by: New District
- Succeeded by: Lorne Proudfoot
- Constituency: Acadia

Personal details
- Born: February 21, 1875 Maxville, Ontario
- Died: April 19, 1933 (aged 58)
- Party: Alberta Liberal Party
- Spouse: Ethel Alguire
- Occupation: farmer

John Arthur McColl (February 21, 1875 – April 19, 1933) was a Canadian politician and Member of the Legislative Assembly from Alberta.

He was born at Maxville, Glengarry County, Ontario to Neil McColl and Annie McDougall. He was educated at Maxville Public School and married to Ethel Alguire on February 6, 1901. He had six children and worked as a farmer near Youngstown, Alberta.

McColl, running as a Liberal, was elected to the Alberta legislature for the first time in the 1913 Alberta general election. He defeated Conservative candidate W.D. Bentley by a comfortable margin to win the new Acadia district.

McColl ran for re-election in the 1917 Alberta general election, he retained his seat in a 3-way race that saw the voter turn out in Acadia 4 times higher than the previous election. In that election he defeated future MLA Lorne Proudfoot, running as an independent candidate, who came in a distant 3rd place.

McColl did not run in the 1921 provincial election, and Proudfoot was elected to represent the constituency.

Legislative Assembly of Alberta
Preceded by New District	MLA Acadia; 1913–1921	Succeeded by Lorne Proudfoot
