= Joseph Tweed Shaw =

Canadian politician (1883–1944)

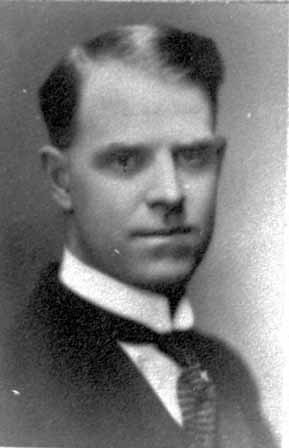

Member of the Canadian House of Commons
- In office 1921–1925
- Preceded by: Thomas Tweedie
- Succeeded by: Richard Bennett
- Constituency: Calgary West

Member of the Legislative Assembly of Alberta
- In office June 28, 1926 – June 19, 1930
- Preceded by: Charles Mitchell
- Succeeded by: John Mackintosh
- Constituency: Bow Valley

Leader of the Alberta Liberal Party
- In office 1926–1930
- Preceded by: John Bowen
- Succeeded by: John McDonald

Personal details
- Born: August 30, 1883 Port Arthur, Ontario, Canada
- Died: July 12, 1944 (aged 60) Calgary, Alberta, Canada
- Party: Independent Labour, Liberal
- Occupation: politician

Joseph Tweed Shaw (August 30, 1883 – July 12, 1944) was a Canadian politician. He served in the House of Commons of Canada from 1921 to 1925 as an independent Labour Member of Parliament (MP), and later became an MLA and leader of the Alberta Liberal Party.

== Early life ==
Shaw was born at Port Arthur, Ontario (later Thunder Bay), and received his early education in Calgary, Alberta. He later received a Bachelor of Laws degree from the University of Michigan, and returned to Alberta to work as a barrister. He served in the Canadian Expeditionary Force during World War I from 1916 to 1918. In religion, he was a Presbyterian.

== Political career ==
He was elected to the Canadian House of Commons in the 1921 federal election, defeating future Conservative Prime Minister Richard Bennett by twelve votes in Calgary West. Shaw is usually considered to have been a Labour candidate but he actually ran as an independent, supported by both the United Farmers of Alberta (UFA) and the Alberta branch of the Dominion Labor Party (DLP). He attended a Progressive Party convention in 1922 and may have been a candidate for that party's leadership. But he stated his independence from all parties in 1923. During his time in parliament, Shaw was associated with the Ginger Group of radical Labour and Progressive representatives.

Shaw sought re-election in 1925 as an independent candidate, and this time received unofficial support from the Liberal Party of Canada. He lost to Bennett in a rematch of 1921, and subsequently became affiliated with the Alberta Liberal Party. On April 21, 1926, he was chosen without opposition as leader of the provincial party. From his new position, he attacked Alberta's UFA ministry as the government of a class rather than of all the people.

In the provincial election June 1926, Shaw led his party to a disappointing 7 seats out of 61. He was personally elected in Bow Valley. In those days, Alternative Voting was used to elect the MLAs in Alberta rural districts. In the first count, he came in second. In the second count, he picked up enough second choice votes from the eliminated Conservative candidate to pass the UFA candidate by one vote, amass a majority of the votes in the district and win the seat.

He served as an opposition member for the next four years. Although leader of the Liberal party, he never served as Leader of the Opposition in the legislature, after a Speaker's ruling divided the Official Opposition funding between all the opposition party leaders. In part due to the Single Transferable Voting system in use in Edmonton and Calgary, there were four opposition groups in the Alberta legislature.

He did not seek re-election in 1930. He attempted a return to the House of Commons in the 1935 federal election, but was unsuccessful in taking the Calgary East seat. He ran for the "Independent Movement" (an anti-Social Credit fusion of Liberals and Progressive Conservatives) in the 1940 provincial election in Calgary where Single Transferable Voting was in use. He came in sixth in the First Count (Calgary had five open seats in this election) and did not receive enough vote transfers to achieve the quota required to win a seat. He again failed to win a seat.

He died four years later.
