= William C. Smith (politician) =

Canadian politician

William Cunningham Smith
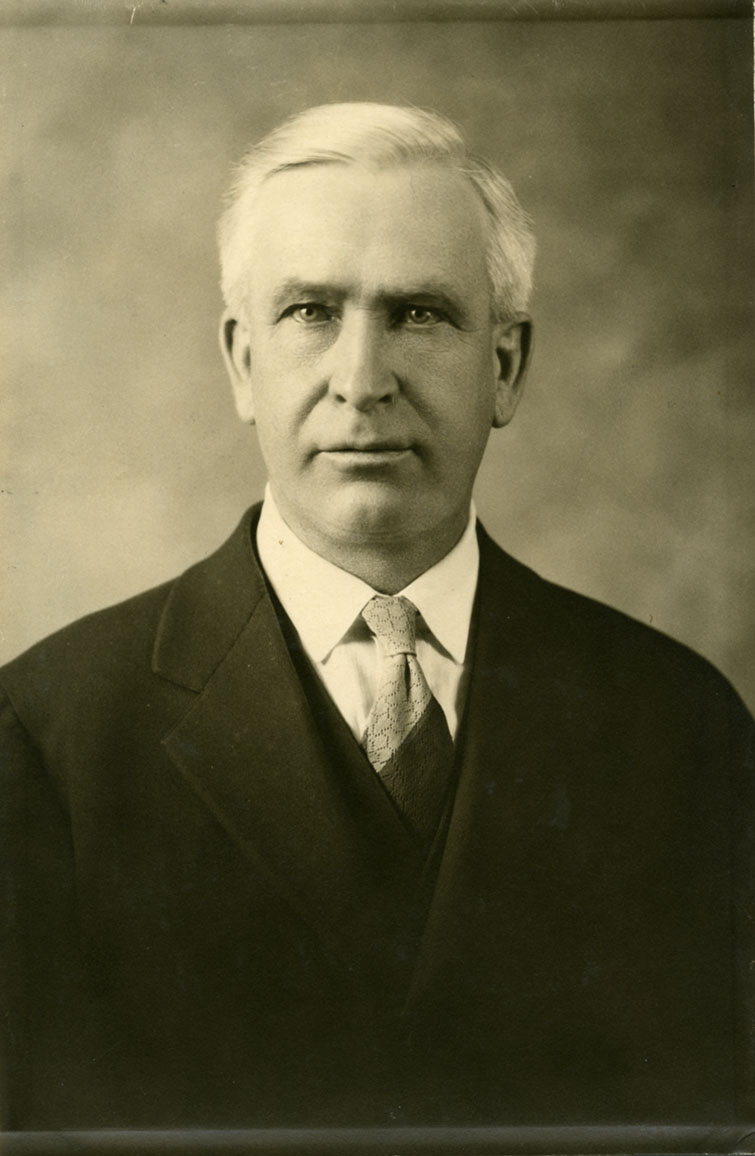

Member of the Legislative Assembly of Alberta
- In office July 18, 1921 – June 28, 1926
- Preceded by: Charles Pingle
- Succeeded by: District abolished
- Constituency: Redcliff
- In office June 28, 1926 – August 22, 1935
- Preceded by: New district
- Succeeded by: David Lush
- Constituency: Empress

Personal details
- Born: July 12, 1875 Glenallen, Ontario
- Died: May 24, 1968 (aged 92) Medicine Hat, Alberta
- Party: United Farmers
- Spouse(s): Susan Evelyn Rutherford m 20 Jan 1907
- Occupation: politician

William Cunningham Smith (July 12, 1875 – May 24, 1968) was a politician from Alberta, Canada. He served in the Legislative Assembly of Alberta from 1921 to 1935 as a member of the United Farmers caucus in government.

== Early life ==
William Cunningham Smith was born July 12, 1875, at Glenallen, Ontario to Abram Smith a public school teacher and his wife Eliza Cunningham, both of Irish descent. He attended Stratford Collegiate Institute and practiced dentistry. He was married January 30, 1907 to Evelyn Rutherford and had two children. Smith served in the 1st Battalion, Canadian Mounted Rifles of the Canadian Expeditionary Force during the Second Boer War.

== Political career ==
Smith first ran for a seat to the Alberta Legislature in the 1921 Alberta general election, as a United Farmers candidate in the electoral district of Redcliff. He defeated Charles Pingle, the Speaker of the Assembly, to pick up the seat for his party.

The electoral district of Redcliff was abolished in redistribution by 1926. Smith ran for re-election in the new seat of Empress in the election held that year and defeated two other candidates.

In the 1930 Alberta general election Smith won a tight two-way race over independent candidate E. A. Mantz.

In the 1935 Alberta general election he was defeated by Social Credit candidate David Lush. He finished a distant second in the three-way race.

Smith died in 1968 at the age of 92.
