= Acadia (provincial electoral district) =

Defunct provincial electoral district in Alberta, Canada

Alberta electoral district

Defunct provincial electoral district
- Legislature: Legislative Assembly of Alberta
- District created: 1913
- District abolished: 1940
- First contested: 1913
- Last contested: 1935

Acadia was a provincial electoral district in Alberta, Canada, mandated to return a single member to the Legislative Assembly of Alberta from 1913 to 1940.

== History ==
The Acadia electoral district was formed from the Sedgewick electoral district prior to the 1913 Alberta general election. The Acadia electoral district would be abolished and the Acadia-Coronation electoral district would be formed in its place prior to the 1940 Alberta general election.

From 1924 to 1940, the district used instant-runoff voting to elect its MLA.

=== Members of the Legislative Assembly (MLAs) ===
Members of the Legislative Assembly for Acadia
| Assembly | Years | Member | Party |
|---|---|---|---|
See Sedgewick electoral district from 1909-1913
| 3rd | 1913–1917 | John McColl | Liberal |
| 4th | 1917–1921 | John McColl | Liberal |
| 5th | 1921–1926 | Lorne Proudfoot | United Farmers |
| 6th | 1926–1930 | Lorne Proudfoot | United Farmers |
| 7th | 1930–1935 | Lorne Proudfoot | United Farmers |
| 8th | 1935–1940 | Norman B. James | Social Credit |
See Acadia-Coronation electoral district from 1940-1963

== Election results ==
=== 1910s ===
1913 Alberta general election
| Party | Candidate | Votes | % |
|---|---|---|---|
| Liberal | John McColl | 637 | 56.27% |
| Conservative | W. D. Bentley | 495 | 43.73% |
| Total | | 1,132 | – |
Source(s) Source: "Acadia Official Results 1913 Alberta general election". Alberta Heritage Community Foundation.

1917 Alberta general election
| Party | Candidate | Votes | % | ±% |
|---|---|---|---|---|
| Liberal | John McColl | 1,842 | 48.22% | -8.05% |
| Conservative | E. Gordon Jonah | 1,229 | 32.17% | -11.56% |
| Independent | Lorne Proudfoot | 749 | 19.61% | – |
| Total | | 3,820 | – | – |
| Rejected, spoiled and declined | | N/A | – | – |
| Eligible electors / turnout | | N/A | N/A | – |
| Liberal hold | | Swing | | 1.75% |
Source(s) Source: "Acadia Official Results 1917 Alberta general election". Alberta Heritage Community Foundation.

=== 1920s ===
1921 Alberta general election
| Party | Candidate | Votes | % | ±% |
|---|---|---|---|---|
| United Farmers | Lorne Proudfoot | 3,106 | 77.42% | – |
| Liberal | James C. Cottrell | 906 | 22.58% | -25.64% |
| Total | | 4,012 | – | – |
| Rejected, spoiled and declined | | N/A | – | – |
| Eligible electors / turnout | | 5,800 | 69.17% | – |
| United Farmers gain from Liberal | | Swing | | 19.39% |
Source(s) Source: "Acadia Official Results 1921 Alberta general election". Alberta Heritage Community Foundation.

1926 Alberta general election
| Party | Candidate | Votes | % | ±% |
|---|---|---|---|---|
| United Farmers | Lorne Proudfoot | 2,056 | 66.65% | -10.77% |
| Conservative | J. P. Kerr | 627 | 20.32% | – |
| Liberal | Geo. Campbell | 402 | 13.03% | -9.55% |
| Total | | 3,085 | – | – |
| Rejected, spoiled and declined | | N/A | – | – |
| Eligible electors / turnout | | 4,253 | 72.54% | – |
| United Farmers hold | | Swing | | -4.26% |
Source(s) Source: "Acadia Official Results 1926 Alberta general election". Alberta Heritage Community Foundation.

=== 1930s ===
1930 Alberta general election
| Party | Candidate | Votes | % | ±% |
|---|---|---|---|---|
| United Farmers | Lorne Proudfoot | 2,103 | 71.87% | 5.23% |
| Independent | J. W. Robinson | 823 | 28.13% | – |
| Total | | 2,926 | – | – |
| Rejected, spoiled and declined | | 75 | – | – |
| Eligible electors / turnout | | 4,041 | 74.26% | – |
| United Farmers hold | | Swing | | -1.29% |
Source(s) Source: "Acadia Official Results 1930 Alberta general election". Alberta Heritage Community Foundation.

1935 Alberta general election
| Party | Candidate | Votes | % | ±% |
|---|---|---|---|---|
| Social Credit | Norman B. James | 1,834 | 66.67% | – |
| United Farmers | Lorne Proudfoot | 628 | 22.83% | -49.04% |
| Liberal | F. W. Beynon | 289 | 10.51% | – |
| Total | | 2,751 | – | – |
| Rejected, spoiled and declined | | 85 | – | – |
| Eligible electors / turnout | | 3,142 | 90.26% | – |
| Social Credit gain from United Farmers | | Swing | | 0.05% |
Source(s) Source: "Acadia Official Results 1935 Alberta general election". Alberta Heritage Community Foundation.

== See also ==
- List of Alberta provincial electoral districts
- Canadian provincial electoral districts
- Acadia (federal electoral district)
- Acadia-Coronation
