= George Johnston (Canadian politician) =

Canadian politician (1884–1977)

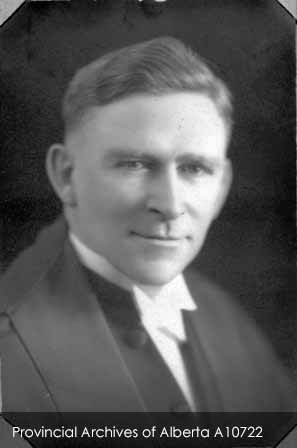

Speaker of the Legislative Assembly of Alberta
- In office February 10, 1927 – July 22, 1935
- Preceded by: Oran McPherson
- Succeeded by: Nathan Eldon Tanner

Member of the Legislative Assembly of Alberta
- In office July 18, 1921 – August 22, 1935
- Preceded by: William Wallace Wilson
- Succeeded by: George MacLachlan
- Constituency: Coronation

Personal details
- Born: September 13, 1884 Wingham, Ontario
- Died: September 28, 1977 (aged 93) Edmonton, Alberta
- Party: United Farmers

George Norman Johnston (September 13, 1884 – September 28, 1977) was a politician elected to the Legislative Assembly of Alberta for the first time in 1921. He served as Speaker of the Alberta Legislature from February 10, 1927, to July 22, 1935. He was defeated in 1935 when Social Credit swept to power. It was the second time in Alberta's history that a Speaker suffered electoral defeat.

== Bibliography ==
- Perry, Sandra E.; Footz, Valerie L. (2006). A Higher Duty: Speakers of the Legislative Assemblies of the North-West Territories and Alberta, 1888-2005. Edmonton, Alberta: Legislative Assembly of Alberta. ISBN 0-9689217-3-6.

Legislative Assembly of Alberta
Preceded by William Wallace Wilson	MLA Coronation; 1921-1935	Succeeded by George MacLachlan
Preceded by Oran McPherson	Speaker of the Alberta Legislative Assembly; 1927-1936	Succeeded by Nathan Eldon Tanner
