= Louis Robert =

Louis Robert may refer to:

- Louis Robert (historian) (1904–1985), historian
- Louis Léopold Robert (1794–1835), Swiss painter
- Louis Eugène Robert (1806–1882), French naturalist, geologist and entomologist
- Louis-Nicolas Robert (1761–1828), French soldier and mechanical engineer
- Louis-Valentin Robert, French sculptor

== See also ==
- Louis Roberts, Canadian politician
- Lewis Roberts (disambiguation)
