= 1913 Alberta general election =

Election to determine the members of the Legislature in Alberta, Canada

- 25 March 1913

56 seats in the Legislative Assembly of Alberta 29 seats were needed for a majority
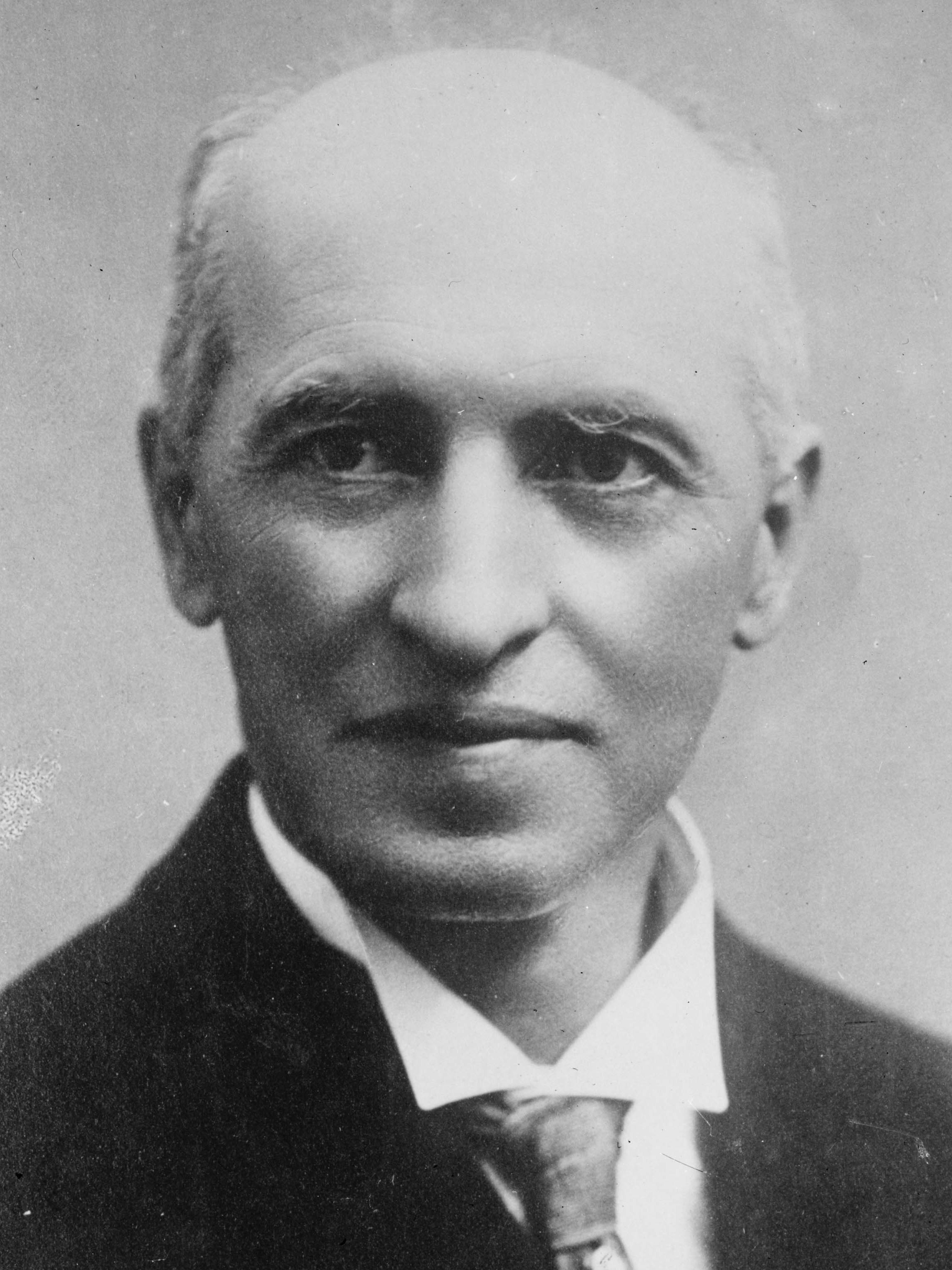

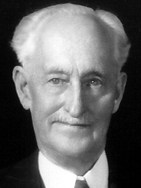

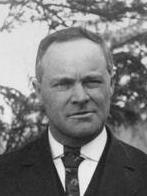
| | Majority party | Minority party | Third party |
|---|---|---|---|
| Leader | Arthur Sifton | Edward Michener | Charles M. O'Brien |
| Party | Liberal | Conservative | Socialist |
| Leader since | 1910 | 1910 | 1909 |
| Leader's seat | Vermilion | Red Deer | ran in Rocky Mountain (lost) |
| Last election | 36 seats, 59.3% | 2 seats, 31.7% | 1 seat, 2.6% |
| Seats before | 33 | 6 | 1 |
| Seats won | 39 | 17 | 0 |
| Seat change | ▲6 | ▲11 | ▼1 |
| Popular vote | 47,748 | 43,737 | 1,814 |
| Percentage | 49.23% | 45.10% | 1.87% |
| Swing | ▼10.1 | ▲13.4% | ▼0.7% |
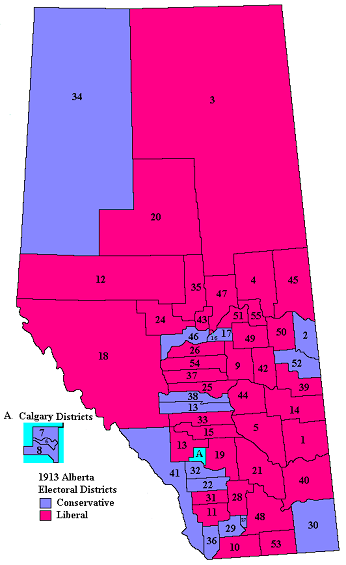
- Map of 1913 Provincial electoral districts
Premier before election
Arthur Sifton
Liberal
Premier after election
Arthur Sifton
Liberal

The 1913 Alberta general election was held in March 1913. The writ was dropped on 25 March 1913 and election day was held 17 April 1913 to elect 56 members to the 3rd Alberta Legislature. Elections in two northern districts took place on 30 July 1913 to compensate for the remote location of the riding. The method to elect members was under the First Past the Post voting system with the exception of the Edmonton district which returned two members under a plurality block vote. The election was unusual with the writ period for the general election being a very short period of 23 days.

Premier Arthur Sifton led the Alberta Liberal Party into his first election as leader, after taking over from Alexander Rutherford. Premier Rutherford had resigned for his government's involvement in the Alberta and Great Waterways Railway Scandal but remained a sitting member. Sifton faced great criticism for calling the snap election, after ramming gerrymandered electoral boundaries through the legislature, running up the provincial debt and neglecting on promised railways. The Socialist Party carried the banner for labour- and farmer-minded voters in five constituencies; in others, Independent candidates were of distinctively leftist sentiment.

Edward Michener, the official opposition leader of the Conservative Party, ended up capitalizing on anger toward the Sifton government. He would lead the largest opposition to date in Alberta history. The Liberals would win a comfortable majority of seats despite being almost even in the popular vote. The Socialist Party vote would collapse and lose their only seat as Charles M. O'Brien went down to defeat at the hands of a Conservative.

== Events leading to the election ==
=== The campaign ===
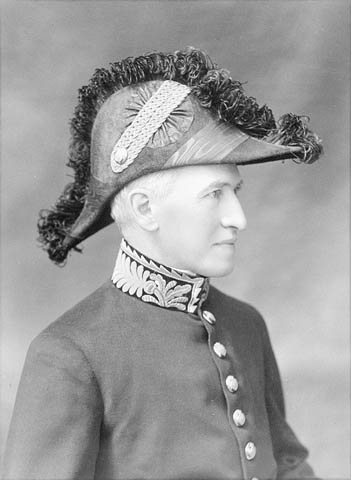
Premier Arthur L. Sifton

The writ of election was issued after a sitting of the house on the night of 25 March 1913. The premier dropped the election writ and dissolved the house after he ensured that the governments legislation on new electoral boundaries had been given Royal Assent. The new boundaries gave the Liberals an advantage, not only were they blatantly gerrymandered to their favour, but the opposition and even private citizens had a tough time figuring out what district they were in.

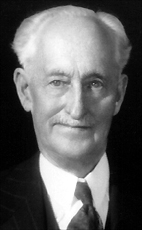
Edward Michener Leader of the official opposition.

Day one of the campaign brought controversy as it was reported that Hotel organizers and Liquor establishments were being expected to donate generously to the Liberal campaign in order to get licence renewals for their establishments.

Arthur Sifton, his lieutenant Charles Cross and Liberal candidate Alexander Grant MacKay each won nominations in two electoral districts. The Calgary Herald (a Conservative newspaper) surmised that Sifton and Cross were so scared of the electorate they felt they might not win if they ran in just one district. It accused Premier Sifton of having little confidence in his ability to return his government to power.

The Liberal government in order to prevent possible vote splitting made promises of concessions to trade unions and labour organizations so that they would not publicly support leftist candidates. John McDougall, a member of the Methodist missionary family that founded Victoria settlement, ran in Calgary as a Liberal on a progressive platform.

The Conservative Party protested the snap election by filing a legal injunction in the Supreme Court, to prevent the election from being held on 17 April 1913. The grounds for the injunction were based on the date of nomination closure being in violation of statue. The writs were issued with nomination day being 10 April 1913. The Conservatives argued that this was 10 hours short of the 16 full days prescribed in the Elections Ordinance, and the election should be ruled invalid.

=== Election issues ===
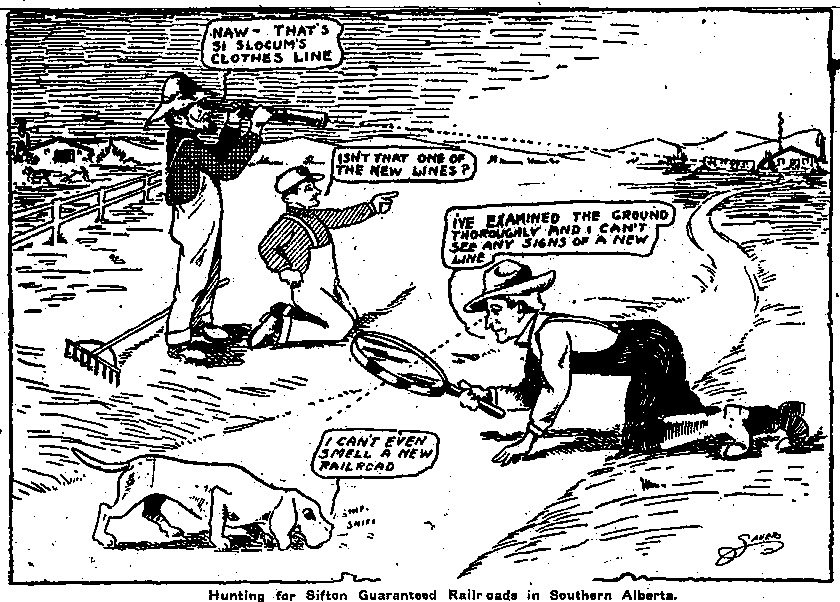
Calgary Herald cartoon satirizing Premier Arthur Sifton's promised railroads.

The big issues of the election centred on the Sifton government's lack of infrastructure building in Southern Alberta.

The ballooning Alberta debt which in a few years had gone from C$2 million to C$27 million was talked about often.

=== Gerrymandered boundaries ===
Prior to the dropping of the writ the Sifton government forced a bill through the Legislative Assembly of Alberta. The bill was entitled Bill 90: An Act to Amend an Act concerning members elected to the Legislative assembly of Alberta It was introduced in the assembly on 20 March 1913 and given Royal Assent on 25 March 1913.

The bill increased the number of MLAs in the province by 15. Calgary was divided into two single-member districts; Edmonton continued as two-member district. The single-member districts did not contain equal population, with one riding Clearwater, north of Edmonton, only containing 74 people enumerated. Calgary Centre was the largest population wise with 20,000 people enumerated. The bill drew districts so that a line at the centre of the province's population (about in line with Red Deer), gave 30 seats to the people of the north half with 26 seats to the southern half. (The bill drew districts so that a line at the centre of the province (about in line with Edmonton), gave 19 seats to the north half of the province, up from the previous 13, with 37 seats in the south half, nine more than previously.)

The Conservative and Socialist opposition vigorously opposed the bill, but failed to pass any amendments. The bill was jammed through third reading in the 25 March legislative sitting and given Royal Assent that evening, just shy of the writ of elections being dropped.

=== Siftonism ===
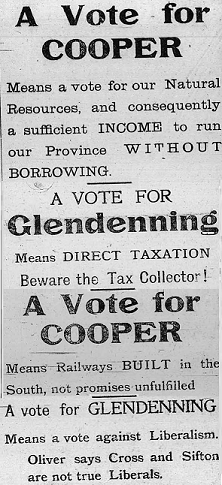
A ad that appeared in the Nanton News 10 April 1913 effectively highlights campaign issues, the ad was run by Conservative J.T. Cooper to attack his opponent Liberal John Glendenning

The Liberal campaign was dubbed "Siftonism" inferring that Sifton was a disease that needed to be cleaned from Alberta. The media at the time picked up on that, and roasted the Liberal party. The Conservative party attacked the Liberals on the Railway Scandal and Lack of provincial infrastructure.

== Electoral system ==
First-past-the-post voting was used in the single-member districts.

In Edmonton the seats were filled through Plurality block voting, where each voter could cast two votes. (Unusually for block voting, in Edmonton, candidates of two different parties were elected. Usually block voting produces a one-party sweep of a district's seats, as had been done in Edmonton in 1909 and was the case in Edmonton in 1921.)

== Results ==
The final result was the Liberal Party, under its new leader, Arthur L. Sifton, won a third term in office, defeating the Conservative Party, which was once again led by Edward Michener. Liberal party candidates took 49 per cent of the vote and with the election of 38 members, the party took 68 per cent of the seats in the Legislature.

The votes were split almost evenly between the Conservatives and Liberals with a difference of 4 per cent separating the two parties. The opposition Conservatives received a larger proportion of the votes than it had done in 1909 (45 per cent versus 32 in 1909) and increased its seat count to 17 from 2, while the Liberals again got more votes than any other party and won many of the new seats, allowing them to hang onto a majority of seats in the legislative assembly.

In the Rocky Mountain constituency, the Socialist vote doubled but the vote for the Conservative candidate went up even more, to make that candidate the winner, and the Socialist Party lost its only seat in the Assembly.

Oddly, the Assembly elected in 1913 never had its full complement of MLAs, as C.W. Cross was elected to two seats (one in Edmonton and the Edson seat). When this happened elsewhere, such as in 1896, when Laurier was elected as MP in both the riding of Saskatchewan, North-West Territories (including part of what would be Alberta) (the provisional district of Saskatchewan) and a seat in Quebec, the double winner resigned one of the seats. But in Alberta from 1913 to 1917, Cross held both seats.

=== Summary ===
| Party | Party Leader | # of candidates | Seats | | | Popular Vote | | |
|---|---|---|---|---|---|---|---|---|
| Party | Party Leader | # of candidates | 1909 | Elected | % Change | # | % | % Change |
| Liberal | Arthur L. Sifton | 51/54^{1} ^{2} | 36 | 38/39^{1} | +8.3% | 47,748 | 49.23% | -10.03% |
| Conservative | Edward Michener | 56 | 2 | 17 | +750% | 43,737 | 45.10% | +13.4% |
| Independent | | 14 | 1 | - | -100% | 3,639 | 3.75% | +0.36% |
| Socialist | Charles M. O'Brien | 5 | 1 | - | -100% | 1,814 | 1.87% | -0.73% |
| Liberal-Labor | Arthur L. Sifton | 2^{3} | * | - | * | ^{4} | ^{4} | * |
| Independent Liberal | | 1 | 1 | - | -100% | 47 | 0.05% | -2.57% |
| Total | | 129/132 | 41 | 55/56 | +36.6% | 96,985 | 100% | |
Source: Elections Alberta

Note

1. Charles Cross ran in and won in two ridings.
2. Arthur Sifton and Alexander G. MacKay ran for the Liberals in two districts but only won in 1 district.
3. Liberal-Labor candidates were a result of the Liberal Labour coalition struck by Premier Sifton prior to the election, these candidates ran in place of Liberals. See also Liberal-Labour (Canada).
4. Liberal-Labor popular vote is included in Liberal vote.

Popular vote
| Liberal | 49.23% |
| Conservative | 45.10% |
| Others | 5.67% |

Seats summary
| Liberal | 69.64% |
| Conservative | 30.36% |

| Party name | | Calgary | Edmonton^{1} | North | Central | South | Total |
|---|---|---|---|---|---|---|---|
| Liberal | Seats: | 0 | 1 | 11 | 15 | 11 | 38 |
| Liberal | Popular vote: | 32.1% | 40.3% | 37.9% | 32.5% | 19.8% | |
| Conservative | Seats: | 3 | 2 | 1 | 5 | 7 | 18 |
| Conservative | Popular vote: | 50.5% | 31.5% | 38.3% | 44.1% | 55.5% | |
| Total seats: | | 3 | 3 | 12 | 20 | 18 | 56 |
Parties that won no seats:
| Socialist | Popular vote: | 5.5% | 1.0% | 3.1% | 1.2% | 2.8% | |
| Independent | Popular vote: | 0.1% | 0.2% | - | - | 0.1% | |
| Independent Liberal | Popular vote: | 0.1% | 0.2% | - | - | 0.1% | |

== Members elected ==
For complete electoral history, see individual districts

| Electoral district | Candidates | | | Incumbent |
| Electoral district | Liberal | Conservative | Other | Incumbent |
|---|---|---|---|---|
| Acadia | John A. McColl; 637; 56.27% | W.D. Bentley; 495; 43.73% | | New District |
| Alexandra | N.C. Lyster; 470; 40.69% | James R. Lowery; 478; 41.39% | W.H. Anderson; 207; 17.92% | Alwyn Bramley-Moore |
| Athabasca | Alexander Grant MacKay; 5,327; 838.90% | J.H. Wood; 221; 34.80% | | Jean Léon Côté |
| Beaver River | Wilfrid Gariepy; 457; 61.67% | A. Grey; 284; 38.33% | | New District |
| Bow Valley | George Lane; 396; 61.78% | Harold William Hounsfield Riley; 245; 38.22% | | New District |
| Centre Calgary | John Chantler McDougall; 728; 31.76% | Thomas M.M. Tweedie; 1,564; 68.24% | | New District from Calgary; Thomas M.M. Tweedie |
| North Calgary | George Henry Ross; 822; 32.11% | Samuel Bacon Hillocks; 1,482; 57.89% | Harry Roderick Burge (Socialist); 256; 10.00% | New District from Calgary |
| South Calgary | Clifford Teasdale Jones; 1,423; 28.03% | Thomas H. Blow; 3,654; 71.97% | | New District from Calgary |
| Camrose | George P. Smith; 1,651; 86.89% | R.L. Rushton; 249; 13.11% | | George P. Smith |
| Cardston | Martin Woolf; 518; 51.96% | C. Jensen; 479; 48.04% | | John William Woolf |
| Claresholm | William Moffat; 496; 51.08% | D.S. McMillan; 348; 35.84% | G. Malshow; 127; 13.08% | Malcolm McKenzie |
| Clearwater | Henry William McKenney; 40; 38.83% | A. Williamson Taylor; 39; 37.86% | Joseph Andrew Clarke (Socialist); 24; 23.30% | New District |
| Cochrane | Charles Wellington Fisher; 475; 55.56% | H.F. Jarrett; 380; 44.44% | | Charles Wellington Fisher |
| Coronation | Frank H. Whiteside; 739; 51.61% | William Wallace Wilson; 693; 48.39% | | New District |
| Didsbury | Joseph E. Stauffer; 948; 59.32% | G.B. Sexsmith; 650; 40.68% | | Joseph E. Stauffer |
| Edmonton | Charles Wilson Cross; 5,407; 26.29% | William Antrobus Griesbach; 4,499; 21.87% | J.D. Blayney (Temperance); 643; 3.13% | Charles Wilson Cross |
| Edmonton | Alexander Grant MacKay; 4,913; 23.89% | Albert Freeman Ewing; 5,107; 24.83% | | John Alexander McDougall |
| Edmonton-South | Alexander Cameron Rutherford; 1,275; 45.57% | Herbert Howard Crawford; 1,523; 54.43% | | Renamed from Strathcona; Alexander Cameron Rutherford |
| Edson | Charles Wilson Cross; 6,078; 462.21% | H.H. Verge; 644; 48.97% | | New District |
| Gleichen | John P. McArthur; 641; 52.67% | George McElroy; 576; 47.33% | | Ezra H. Riley |
| Grouard | Jean Léon Côté; 347; 63.32% | O. Travers; 201; 36.68% | | New District |
| Hand Hills | Robert Berry Eaton; 962; 53.36% | Albert J. Robertson; 841; 46.64% | | New District |
| High River | R.L. McMillan; 558; 47.53% | George Douglas Stanley; 616; 52.47% | | Louis Melville Roberts |
| Innisfail | John A. Simpson; 526; 49.58% | Frederick William Archer; 535; 50.42% | | John A. Simpson |
| Lac Ste. Anne | Peter Gunn; 517; 52.17% | George R. Barker; 474; 47.83% | | Peter Gunn |
| Lacombe | William Franklin Puffer; 878; 58.46% | Angus MacDonald; 624; 41.54% | | William Franklin Puffer |
| Leduc | Stanley G. Tobin; 582; 57.17% | George Curry; 436; 42.83% | | Robert T. Telford |
| Lethbridge City | J.O. Jones; 1,033; 38.46% | John S. Stewart; 1,371; 51.04% | Joseph R. Knight (Socialist); 282; 10.50% | John S. Stewart |
| Little Bow | James McNaughton; 721; 52.02% | John T. MacDonald; 339; 24.46% | F.A. Bryant (Ind.); 202; 14.57% Alfred Buddon (Socialist); 124; 8.95% | New District |
| Macleod | Arthur L. Sifton; 560; 49.17% | Robert Patterson; 579; 50.83% | | Robert Patterson |
| Medicine Hat | Charles Richmond Mitchell; 1,823; 49.73% | Nelson C. Spencer; 1,843; 50.27% | | William Thomas Finlay |
| Nanton | John M. Glendenning; 463; 59.51% | J.T. Cooper; 315; 40.49% | | John M. Glendenning |
| Okotoks | John A. Turner; 380; 39.01% | George Hoadley; 594; 60.99% | | George Hoadley |
| Olds | Duncan Marshall; 709; 51.94% | George H. Cloakey; 656; 48.06% | | Duncan Marshall |
| Peace River | William A. Rae; 437; 45.57% | Alphaeus Patterson; 475; 49.53% | William Bredin (Ind. Liberal); 47; 4.90% | James K. Cornwall |
| Pembina | Gordon MacDonald; 432; 50.64% | F.D. Armitage; 421; 49.36% | | Henry William McKenney |
| Pincher Creek | A.N. Mount; 426; 46.66% | John H.W.S. Kemmis; 487; 53.34% | | David Warnock |
| Ponoka | William A. Campbell; 485; 51.65% | George Gordon; 257; 27.37% | P. Baker; 197; 20.98% | William A. Campbell |
| Red Deer | Robert B. Welliver; 786; 42.44% | Edward Michener; 869; 46.92% | George Patton; 197; 10.64% | Edward Michener |
| Redcliff | Charles S. Pingle; 645; 60.11% | H.S. Gerow; 428; 39.89% | | New District |
| Ribstone | James Gray Turgeon; 669; 55.56% | William John Blair; 535; 44.44% | | New District |
| Rocky Mountain | William B. Powell; 516; 19.60% | Robert E. Campbell; 1,099; 41.74% | Charles M. O'Brien (Socialist); 1,018; 38.66% | Charles M. O'Brien |
| Sedgewick | Charles Stewart; 889; 70.56% | W. Watson; 371; 29.44% | | Charles Stewart |
| St. Albert | Lucien Boudreau; 620; 60.55% | Hector L. Landry; 404; 39.45% | | Lucien Boudreau |
| St. Paul | Prosper-Edmond Lessard; 441; 55.75% | L. Garneau; 350; 44.25% | | New District |
| Stettler | Robert L. Shaw; 928; 45.65% | George W. Morris; 907; 44.61% | Malcolm McNeil; 198; 9.74% | Robert L. Shaw |
| Stony Plain | John A. McPherson; 368; 38.94% | Conrad Weidenhammer; 577; 61.06% | | John A. McPherson |
| Sturgeon | John Robert Boyle; 936; 62.73% | James Duncan Hyndman; 556; 37.27% | | John Robert Boyle |
| Taber | Archibald J. McLean; 1,231; 68.16% | William C. Ives; 341; 18.88% | Thomas E. Smith (Socialist); 234; 12.96% | New District |
| Vegreville | Joseph S. McCallum; 812; 45.72% | F.A. Morrison; 420; 23.65% | Peter Savarich; 544; 30.63% | James Bismark Holden |
| Vermilion | Arthur L. Sifton; 772; 47.68% | J. George Clark; 571; 35.27% | Gregory Krikevsky; 276; 17.05% | Archibald Campbell |
| Victoria | Francis A. Walker; 773; 62.49% | R.A. Bennett; 268; 21.67% | M. Gowda; 196; 15.84% | Francis A. Walker |
| Wainwright | H.Y. Pawling; 615; 46.38% | George LeRoy Hudson; 711; 53.62% | | New District |
| Warner | Frank S. Leffingwell; 314; 43.67% | W.H. Scott; 137; 19.05% | William T. Patton; 268; 37.27% | New District |
| Wetaskiwin | Charles H. Olin; 780; 57.35% | George B. Campbell; 580; 42.65% | | Charles H. Olin |
| Whitford | Andrew S. Shandro; 499; 45.70% | R.L. Hughson; 133; 12.18% | Paul Rudyk (Ind.); 312; 28.57% C. F. Connolly (Ind.); 148; 13.55% | New District |

== See also ==
- List of Alberta political parties
