= Innisfail (provincial electoral district) =

Defunct provincial electoral district in Alberta, Canada

Alberta electoral district

Defunct provincial electoral district
- Legislature: Legislative Assembly of Alberta
- District created: 1905
- District abolished: 1940
- District re-created: 1971
- District re-abolished: 1993
- First contested: 1905
- Last contested: 1989

Innisfail was a provincial electoral district in Alberta, Canada, mandated to return a single member to the Legislative Assembly of Alberta from 1905 to 1940 and again from 1971 to 1993.

== History ==
Innisfail was one of the original 25 electoral districts contested in the 1905 Alberta general election after Alberta became a province in September 1905. The electoral district was a continuation of the Innisfail North-West Territories electoral district, which was formed in 1902. The electoral district was named for the town of Innisfail in central Alberta.

The first Member of the Legislative Assembly for Innisfail was John A. Simpson who had been elected in the 1902 North-West Territories general election to the Innisfail seat in the 5th North-West Legislative Assembly.

From 1924 to 1940, the district used instant-runoff voting to elect its MLA.

Prior to the 1940 Alberta general election Innisfail was split between Rocky Mountain House and Red Deer electoral districts. However Innisfail would be re-formed in the 1970 electoral district re-distribution.

Innisfail was dissolved again in the 1993 electoral district redistribution to form the Innisfail-Sylvan Lake electoral district.

=== Members of the Legislative Assembly (MLAs) ===
Members of the Legislative Assembly for Athabasca
Assembly	Years	Member	Party
1st	1905–1909	John A. Simpson	Liberal
2nd	1909–1913	John A. Simpson	Liberal
3rd	1913–1917	Fred W. Archer	Conservative
4th	1917–1921	Daniel Morkeberg	Liberal
5th	1921–1926	Donald Cameron	United Farmers
6th	1926–1930	Donald Cameron	United Farmers
7th	1930–1935	Donald Cameron	United Farmers
8th	1935–1940	Alban E. MacLellan	Social Credit
See Rocky Mountain House electoral district from 1940-1971 and Red Deer electoral district from 1940-1971
17th	1971–1975	Clifford L. Doan	Progressive Conservative
18th	1975–1979	Clifford L. Doan	Progressive Conservative
19th	1979–1982	Nigel I. Pengelly	Progressive Conservative
20th	1982–1986	Nigel I. Pengelly	Progressive Conservative
21st	1986–1989	Nigel I. Pengelly	Progressive Conservative
22nd	1989–1993	Gary Severtson	Progressive Conservative
See Innisfail-Sylvan Lake electoral district from 1993-present

== Election results ==
=== 1905 ===
1905 Alberta general election
Party	Candidate	Votes	%	±%
Liberal	John A. Simpson	408	50.06%	–
Conservative	Sam J. Curry	407	49.94%	–
Total		815	–	–
Rejected, spoiled and declined		N/A	–	–
Eligible electors / turnout		815	N/A	–
Liberal pickup new district.				
Source(s) Source: "Innisfail Official Results 1905 Alberta general election". Alberta Heritage Community Foundation.

When votes were counted, it was found that the two candidates were tied, 407 to 407. The returning officer, appointed by Rutherford, broke the tie by giving his vote to the Liberal candidate.

=== 1909 ===
1909 Alberta general election
Party	Candidate	Votes	%	±%
Liberal	John A. Simpson	519	53.45%	3.39%
Conservative	G. W. West	452	46.55%	-3.39%
Total		971	–	–
Rejected, spoiled and declined		N/A	–	–
Eligible electors / turnout		1,340	72.46%	–
Liberal hold		Swing		3.39%
Source(s) Source: "Innisfail Official Results 1909 Alberta general election". Alberta Heritage Community Foundation.

=== 1913 ===
1913 Alberta general election
Party	Candidate	Votes	%	±%
Conservative	Fred W. Archer	535	50.42%	3.87%
Liberal	John A. Simpson	526	49.58%	-3.87%
Total		1,061	–	–
Rejected, spoiled and declined		N/A	–	–
Eligible electors / turnout		1,387	76.50%	4.04%
Conservative gain from Liberal		Swing		1.94%
Source(s) Source: "Innisfail Official Results 1913 Alberta general election". Alberta Heritage Community Foundation.

=== 1917 ===
1917 Alberta general election
Party	Candidate	Votes	%	±%
Liberal	Daniel Morkeberg	905	51.33%	5.49%
Conservative	T. W. Archer	766	43.45%	-10.71%
Independent	J. K. Wilson	92	5.22%	–
Total		1,763	–	–
Rejected, spoiled and declined		N/A	–	–
Eligible electors / turnout		2,425	72.70%	-4.30%
Liberal gain from Conservative		Swing		-0.22%
Source(s) Source: "Innisfail Official Results 1917 Alberta general election". Alberta Heritage Community Foundation.

=== 1921 ===
1921 Alberta general election
Party	Candidate	Votes	%	±%
United Farmers	Donald Cameron	1,661	69.15%	–
Liberal	Daniel Morkeberg	741	30.85%	-20.48%
Total		2,402	–	–
Rejected, spoiled and declined		N/A	–	–
Eligible electors / turnout		3,283	73.16%	0.46%
United Farmers gain from Liberal		Swing		15.21%
Source(s) Source: "Innisfail Official Results 1921 Alberta general election". Alberta Heritage Community Foundation.

=== 1926 ===
1926 Alberta general election
Party	Candidate	Votes	%	±%
First count
United Farmers	Donald Cameron	1,187	46.27%	-22.82%
Liberal	Daniel Morkeberg	844	32.90%	2.05%
Conservative	L. M. McLean	534	20.82%	–
Total		2,565	–	–
Ballot transfer results
United Farmers	Donald Cameron	1,327	55.52%	–
Liberal	Daniel Morkeberg	1,063	44.48%	–
Total		2,390	–	–
Rejected, spoiled and declined		N/A	–	–
Eligible electors / turnout		3,574	71.77%	-1.49%%
United Farmers hold		Swing		N/A%
Source(s) Source: "Innisfail Official Results 1926 Alberta general election". Alberta Heritage Community Foundation.

=== 1930 ===
1930 Alberta general election
Party	Candidate	Votes	%	±%
First count
United Farmers	Donald Cameron	1,243	45.61%	-0.66%
Liberal	Daniel Morkeberg	878	32.22%	-0.58%
Conservative	George C. Wagner	604	22.17%	1.35%
Total		2,725	–	–
Ballot transfer results
United Farmers	Donald Cameron	1,362	54.28%	–
Liberal	Daniel Morkeberg	1,147	45.72%	–
Total		2,509	–	–
Rejected, spoiled and declined		117	–	–
Eligible electors / turnout		3,674	77.35%	5.58%
United Farmers hold		Swing		N/A%
Source(s) Source: "Innisfail Official Results 1930 Alberta general election". Alberta Heritage Community Foundation.

=== 1935 ===
1935 Alberta general election
Party	Candidate	Votes	%	±%
Social Credit	Alban E. MacLellan	2,805	68.55%	–
Liberal	W. H. Stringer	583	14.25%	-17.97%
United Farmers	Ronald Pye	386	9.43%	-36.18%
Conservative	A. A. Stonehouse	318	7.77%	-14.40%
Total		4,092	–	–
Rejected, spoiled and declined		115	–	–
Eligible electors / turnout		4,805	87.55%	10.20%
Social Credit gain from United Farmers		Swing		27.15%
Source(s) Source: "Innisfail Official Results 1935 Alberta general election". Alberta Heritage Community Foundation.

=== 1971 ===
1971 Alberta general election
Party	Candidate	Votes	%	±%
Progressive Conservative	Clifford L. Doan	3,235	52.60%	–
Social Credit	William Ure	2,915	47.40%	–
Total		6,150	–	–
Rejected, spoiled and declined		59	–	–
Eligible electors / turnout		8,205	75.67%	–
Progressive Conservative pickup new district.				
Source(s) Source: "Innisfail Official Results 1971 Alberta general election". Alberta Heritage Community Foundation.

=== 1975 ===
1975 Alberta general election
Party	Candidate	Votes	%	±%
Progressive Conservative	Clifford L. Doan	4,029	66.44%	13.84%
Social Credit	Ray Reckseidler	1,512	24.93%	-22.46%
New Democratic	Pat Loughlin	376	6.20%	–
Liberal	Fred Monk	147	2.42%	–
Total		6,064	–	–
Rejected, spoiled and declined		16	–	–
Eligible electors / turnout		8,620	70.53%	-5.14%
Progressive Conservative hold		Swing		18.15%
Source(s) Source: "Innisfail Official Results 1975 Alberta general election". Alberta Heritage Community Foundation.

=== 1979 ===
1979 Alberta general election
Party	Candidate	Votes	%	±%
Progressive Conservative	Nigel I. Pengelly	4,263	55.68%	-10.76%
Social Credit	Stuart Little	2,921	38.15%	13.22%
New Democratic	Tim Guilbault	371	4.85%	-1.35%
Liberal	Janet Gratton	101	1.32%	-1.10%
Total		7,656	–	–
Rejected, spoiled and declined		42	–	–
Eligible electors / turnout		11,069	69.17%	-1.37%
Progressive Conservative hold		Swing		-11.99%
Source(s) Source: "Innisfail Official Results 1979 Alberta general election". Alberta Heritage Community Foundation.

=== 1982 ===
1982 Alberta general election
Party	Candidate	Votes	%	±%
Progressive Conservative	Nigel I. Pengelly	6,684	70.93%	15.25%
Western Canada Concept	George Conway-Brown	2,001	21.24%	–
New Democratic	Lyle B. Bleich	738	7.83%	2.99%
Total		9,423	–	–
Rejected, spoiled and declined		37	–	–
Eligible electors / turnout		12,952	73.04%	3.87%
Progressive Conservative hold		Swing		16.08%
Source(s) Source: "Innisfail Official Results 1982 Alberta general election". Alberta Heritage Community Foundation.

=== 1986 ===
1986 Alberta general election
Party	Candidate	Votes	%	±%
Progressive Conservative	Nigel I. Pengelly	4,309	66.01%	-4.92%
New Democratic	Tony Mazurkewich	1,033	15.82%	7.99%
Western Canada Concept	George Conway-Brown	472	7.23%	-14.00%
Representative	Raymond C. Reckseidler	411	6.30%	–
Confederation of Regions	Jack Lynass	303	4.64%	–
Total		6,528	–	–
Rejected, spoiled and declined		18	–	–
Eligible electors / turnout		12,097	54.11%	-18.93%
Progressive Conservative hold		Swing		0.24%
Source(s) Source: "Innisfail Official Results 1986 Alberta general election". Alberta Heritage Community Foundation.

=== 1989 ===
1989 Alberta general election
Party	Candidate	Votes	%	±%
Progressive Conservative	Gary Severtson	4,169	57.71%	-8.30%
Liberal	Bruce Jackson	1,761	24.38%	–
New Democratic	Larry Whaley	1,294	17.91%	2.09%
Total		7,224	–	–
Rejected, spoiled and declined		41	–	–
Eligible electors / turnout		12,230	59.40%	5.29%
Progressive Conservative hold		Swing		-8.43%
Source(s) Source: "Innisfail Official Results 1989 Alberta general election". Alberta Heritage Community Foundation.

== See also ==
- List of Alberta provincial electoral districts
- Canadian provincial electoral districts
