= Rocky Mountain (provincial electoral district) =

Defunct provincial electoral district in Alberta, Canada

Coordinates: 51.2°N 114.9°W

Alberta electoral district

Defunct provincial electoral district
- Legislature: Legislative Assembly of Alberta
- District created: 1909
- District abolished: 1935
- First contested: 1909
- Last contested: 1935

Rocky Mountain was a provincial electoral district in Alberta, Canada, mandated to return a single member to the Legislative Assembly of Alberta from 1909 to 1940.

The Rocky Mountain district is not to be confused with the Rocky Mountain House district, which was formed in 1940, north of the former Rocky Mountain district.

== History ==
=== Members of the Legislative Assembly (MLAs) ===
Members of the Legislative Assembly for Rocky Mountain
Assembly	Years	Member	Party
See Rosebud electoral district from 1905-1909
2nd	1909–1913	Charles M. O'Brien	Socialist Party of Canada
3rd	1913–1917	Robert E. Campbell	Conservative
4th	1917–1921	Robert E. Campbell	Conservative
5th	1921–1926	Philip Martin Christophers	Dominion Labor
6th	1926–1930	Philip Martin Christophers	Dominion Labor
7th	1930–1935	George Edward Cruickshank	Independent
8th	1935–1940	Ernest O. Duke	Social Credit
See Banff-Cochrane electoral district from 1940-1975, Okotoks-High River electoral district from 1940-1971 and Pincher Creek-Crowsnest electoral district from 1940-1993

In 1909 Rocky Mountain was formed from the western edge of Rosebud in the north part of the riding, the entire riding of Banff, the western half of High River and Macleod. As well as the north part of Pincher Creek. In 1940, the north part of the riding merged with Cochrane to form Banff-Cochrane. Okotoks-High River expanded to fill the central portion of the riding and Pincher Creek expanded to fill the south end of the riding and became Pincher Creek-Crowsnest. The riding took in part of the length of the Rocky Mountains along the Alberta–British Columbia border.

After the Alberta Legislature passed an Act in 1909 increasing the number of seats from 25 to 41 and setting the boundaries of the Rocky Mountain district the Frank Paper described the Rocky Mountain constituency as a "monstrous gerrymander" that benefited labour interests. For the 1909 election, an effort was made to have one candidate represent both the Liberal and Conservative parties, but eventually each party nominated a separate candidate. Henry Edward Lyon was nominated for the Conservatives, while John Angus McDonald was nominated for the Liberals.

O'Brien won in 1909 with less than half the votes. He was more popular when he ran for re-election in 1913, but in that election he faced only one candidate and lost.

From 1924 to 1940, the district used instant-runoff voting to elect its MLA.

== Election results ==
=== 1909 ===
1909 Alberta general election
Party	Candidate	Votes	%	±%
Socialist	Charles M. O'Brien	555	37.83%	–
Independent Liberal	John Angus Macdonald	520	35.45%	–
Conservative	Henry Edward Lyon	392	26.72%	–
Total		1,467	–	–
Rejected, spoiled and declined		N/A	–	–
Eligible electors / Turnout		N/A	–	–
Socialist pickup new district.				
Source(s) Source: "Rocky Mountain Official Results 1909 Alberta general election". Alberta Heritage Community Foundation.

=== 1913 ===
1913 Alberta general election
Party	Candidate	Votes	%	±%
Conservative	Robert E. Campbell	1,099	41.74%	15.02%
Socialist	Charles M. O'Brien	1,018	38.66%	0.83%
Liberal	William B. Powell	516	19.60%	–
Total		2,633	–	–
Rejected, spoiled and declined		N/A	–	–
Eligible electors / Turnout		N/A	–	–
Conservative gain from Socialist		Swing		0.35%
Source(s) Source: "Rocky Mountain Official Results 1913 Alberta general election". Alberta Heritage Community Foundation.

=== 1917 ===
1917 Alberta general election
Party	Candidate	Votes	%	±%
Conservative	Robert E. Campbell	Acclaimed	–	–
Total		N/A	–	–
Rejected, spoiled and declined		N/A	–	–
Eligible electors / turnout		N/A	N/A	–
Conservative hold		Swing		N/A
Source(s) Source: "Rocky Mountain Official Results 1917 Alberta general election". Alberta Heritage Community Foundation. One of eleven Members of the Legislative Assembly of Alberta acclaimed under The Elections Act Section 38, which stipulated that any member of the 3rd Alberta Legislative Assembly would be guaranteed re-election, with no contest held, if the member joined for wartime service in the First World War. An Act amending The Election Act respecting Members of the Legislative Assembly on Active Service., SA 1917, c. 38

=== 1921 ===
1921 Alberta general election
Party	Candidate	Votes	%	±%
Dominion Labor	Philip Martin Christophers	1,304	40.02%	–
Liberal	A. Morrison	1,143	35.08%	–
United Farmers	W. Sharpe	811	24.89%	–
Total		3,258	–	–
Rejected, spoiled and declined		N/A	–	–
Eligible electors / Turnout		N/A	–	–
Dominion Labor gain from Conservative		Swing		N/A
Source(s) Source: "Rocky Mountain Official Results 1921 Alberta general election". Alberta Heritage Community Foundation.

From 1924 to 1940, the district used instant-runoff voting to elect its MLA.

=== 1926 ===
1926 Alberta general election
Party	Candidate	Votes	%	±%
Dominion Labor	Philip Martin Christophers	1,765	52.66%	12.63%
Conservative	John Kerr	801	23.90%	–
Liberal	A.M. Densmore	786	23.45%	-11.63%
Total		3,352	–	–
Rejected, spoiled and declined		349	–	–
Eligible electors / Turnout		N/A	–	–
Dominion Labor hold		Swing		11.91%
Source(s) Source: "Rocky Mountain Official Results 1926 Alberta general election". Alberta Heritage Community Foundation.

=== 1930 ===
1930 Alberta general election
Party	Candidate	Votes	%	±%
Independent	George Edward Cruickshank	1,604	50.02%	–
Dominion Labor	Joseph Stobbs	820	25.57%	-27.09%
Independent	R. Sudworth	783	24.42%	–
Total		3,207	–	–
Rejected, spoiled and declined		280	–	–
Eligible electors / Turnout		5,242	66.52%	1.79%
Independent gain from Dominion Labor		Swing		-2.16%
Source(s) Source: "Rocky Mountain Official Results 1930 Alberta general election". Alberta Heritage Community Foundation.

=== 1935 ===
1935 Alberta general election
Party	Candidate	Votes	%	±%
Social Credit	Ernest O. Duke	2,996	54.49%	–
Communist	H. Murphy	1,080	19.64%	–
Liberal	D.J. MacNeil	1,033	18.79%	–
Independent	George Edward Cruickshank	389	7.08%	-42.60%
Total		5,498	–	–
Rejected, spoiled and declined		148	–	–
Eligible electors / Turnout		6,888	81.97%	15.45%
Social Credit gain from Independent		Swing		5.20%
Source(s) Source: "Rocky Mountain Official Results 1935 Alberta general election". Alberta Heritage Community Foundation.

== See also ==
- List of Alberta provincial electoral districts
- Canadian provincial electoral districts
