= Philip Christophers =

Canadian labour and communist politician (1871–1946)

Philip Martin Christophers
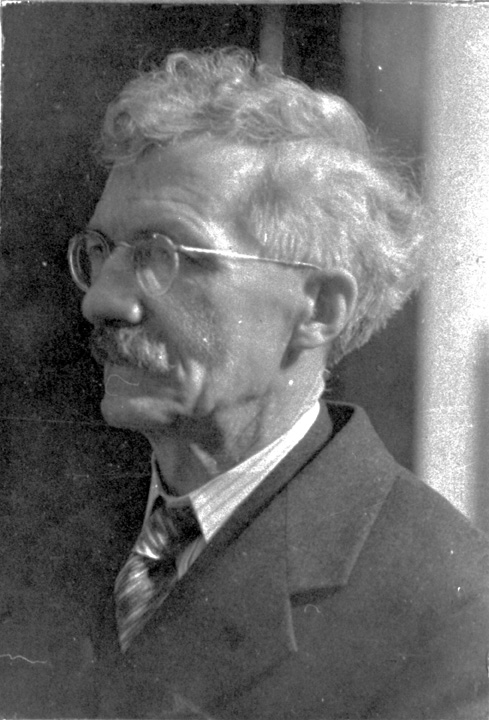

Member of the Legislative Assembly of Alberta
- In office July 18, 1921 – June 19, 1930
- Preceded by: Robert Campbell
- Succeeded by: George Cruickshank
- Constituency: Rocky Mountain

Personal details
- Born: December 21, 1871 Lelant, Cornwall, England
- Died: September 9, 1946 (aged 74) Edmonton, Alberta
- Party: Dominion Labor
- Other political affiliations: Workers' Party of Canada
- Occupation: Miner, politician

Philip Martin Christophers (December 21, 1871 – September 9, 1946) was a Canadian miner, labour activist and provincial politician from Alberta. He served as a member of the Legislative Assembly of Alberta from 1921 to 1930, sitting with the Dominion Labor caucus in opposition. Christophers was also involved in the early Canadian communist movement and became a member of the Workers' Party of Canada, the legal organization established by the underground Communist Party of Canada.

== Labour activism ==
Christophers worked as a coal miner and became active in the labour movement in Alberta's mining districts. He served as president of District 18 of the United Mine Workers of America and supported the movement to affiliate western Canadian miners with the One Big Union.

Christophers was associated with the radical labour movement in the Crowsnest Pass and became provincial spokesperson for the Rocky Mountain Labor Party. That organization subsequently entered the Workers' Party of Canada, the legal public organization associated with the Communist Party of Canada. Christophers later publicly expressed support for the Communist International at the 1923 convention of the Alberta Federation of Labour.

== Political career ==
Christophers ran for a seat to the Alberta Legislature in the 1921 Alberta general election. He stood as a Dominion Labor candidate in the Rocky Mountain electoral district. The race was hotly contested, and Christophers defeated two other candidates to pick up the seat for his party.

Christophers' election occurred during the formative period of the Communist Party of Canada. He became a founding member of the Workers' Party of Canada shortly after his election. A later account published by the Communist Party's newspaper described him as having attended the Workers' Party's founding convention and serving as its Alberta provincial spokesperson while sitting in the legislature.

Christophers ran for a second term in the 1926 Alberta general election. He rolled up a very large majority over two other candidates to hold his seat.

Christophers retired from provincial politics at dissolution of the Assembly in 1930.
