= Donald Cameron Sr. =

Canadian politician (1869–1936)

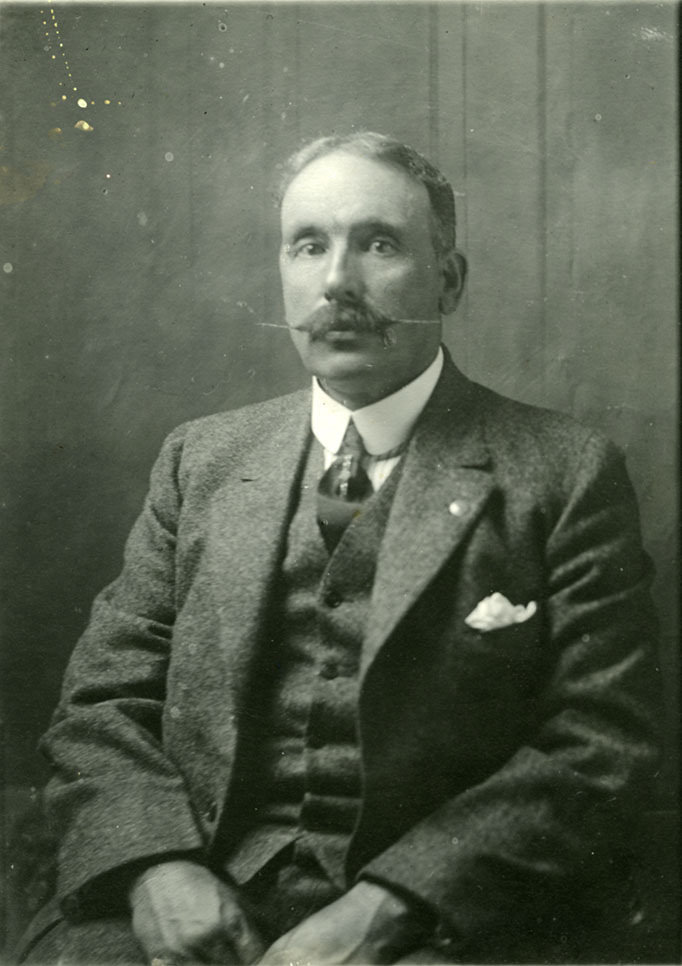

Member of the Legislative Assembly of Alberta
- In office July 18, 1921 – August 22, 1935
- Preceded by: Daniel Morkeberg
- Succeeded by: Alban MacLellan
- Constituency: Innisfail

Personal details
- Born: September 16, 1869 Wood End, Scotland
- Died: January 29, 1936 (aged 66) Calgary, Alberta
- Party: United Farmers
- Children: Donald
- Occupation: engineer, farmer and politician

Donald Cameron Sr. (September 16, 1869 – January 29, 1936) was a farmer, engineer and a provincial politician from Alberta, Canada. He served as a member of the Legislative Assembly of Alberta from 1921 to 1935 sitting with the United Farmers caucus in government.

== Early life ==
Donald Cameron was born in Scotland. He became an engineer and lived in Hong Kong for a time. He moved back to England and had a son Donald Cameron Jr. on March 6, 1901. He moved to Elnora, Alberta in 1906 and began farming.

== Political career ==
Cameron ran for a seat to the Alberta Legislature in the 1921 Alberta general election as a United Farmers candidate in the electoral district of Innisfail. He won the seat for his party by sweeping over the incumbent Liberal, Daniel Morkeberg.

Cameron ran for a second term in the 1926 Alberta general election. He faced a hotly contested three way race facing Morkeburg for the second time. Cameron hung on to win the election with second choice vote preferences.

Morkeburg and Cameron would face each other one last time in the 1930 Alberta general election. The three-way race was very close with Cameron edging Morkeburg out on second preference votes.

Morkeburg did not run for a fourth term in office and retired at dissolution of the assembly in 1935.
