= Donald Cameron (Alberta politician) =

Canadian politician (1901–1989)

The Honourable Donald Cameron Jr.

Canadian Senator from Alberta
- In office July 28, 1955 – September 19, 1987
- Appointed by: Louis St. Laurent

Personal details
- Born: March 6, 1901 Devonport, England
- Died: February 13, 1989 (aged 87) Calgary, Alberta, Canada
- Party: Independent Liberal
- Occupation: Politician; author; teacher; academic

Donald Cameron Jr. (March 6, 1901 – February 13, 1989) was a Canadian academic, author, teacher and politician. He served as a member of the Canadian Senate sitting as an Independent Liberal from 1955 to 1987.

== Early life ==
Donald Cameron, Jr. was born in Devonport, Devon, England, he emigrated to Canada with his family when he was 5 years of age and settled in Elnora, Alberta. His father Donald Cameron, Sr. was a member of the Alberta Legislature from 1921 to 1935.

Cameron received a Master of Science degree in agriculture from the University of Alberta in 1934 and also was a member of the Zeta Psi Fraternity. From 1936 to 1956, he was a professor at the University of Alberta and was head of the Banff School of Fine Arts. He help found the Banff School of Advanced Management in 1952.

== Political career ==
Cameron was politically involved early in his life when he was part of the youth wing of the United Farmers while his dad was a Member of the Legislative Assembly.

Cameron was summoned to the Senate of Canada on July 28, 1955, on the advice of Prime Minister Louis St. Laurent. He designated his senatorial division Banff, Alberta. He sat as an Independent Liberal and resigned on September 19, 1987.
