= Clifford Doan =

Canadian politician (1905–1990)

Clifford Lawrence Doan

Member of the Legislative Assembly of Alberta
- In office 1971–1979
- Preceded by: Alban MacLellan (old district)
- Succeeded by: Nigel Pengelly
- Constituency: Innisfail

Personal details
- Born: April 27, 1905 Halkirk, Alberta
- Died: November 25, 1990 (aged 85) Red Deer, Alberta
- Party: Progressive Conservative

Clifford Lawrence Doan (April 27, 1905 – November 25, 1990) was a provincial level politician from Alberta, Canada. He served as a member of the Legislative Assembly of Alberta from 1971 to 1979 sitting with the governing Progressive Conservative caucus.

== Political career ==
Doan ran for a seat to the Alberta Legislature in the 1971 Alberta general election. He ran against Social Credit incumbent William Ure in the new electoral district of Innisfail. Doan won the straight fight defeating Ure by less than 300 votes.

Doan ran for re-election in the 1975 Alberta general election. He faced three other opposing candidates and increased his popular support. The opposition vote collapsed and he won the district with a near landslide. Doan retired from provincial politics at dissolution of the assembly in 1979.
