= Daniel Edward Riley =

Canadian politician

The Honourable Daniel Edward Riley
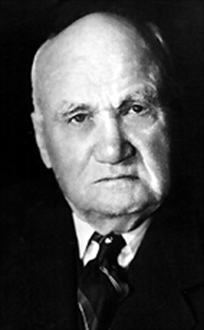

Canadian Senator from Alberta
- In office June 25, 1926 – April 27, 1948
- Appointed by: Wilfrid Laurier

Personal details
- Born: November 28, 1860 Baltic, Prince Edward Island, Canada
- Died: April 27, 1948 (aged 87) Calgary, Alberta, Canada
- Party: Liberal
- Occupation: politician, insurance agent, rancher and real estate agent

Daniel Edward Riley (November 28, 1860 – April 27, 1948) was a Canadian politician, insurance agent, rancher and real estate agent from Alberta, Canada.

== Early life ==
Daniel Edward Riley was born on November 28, 1860, in Baltic, Prince Edward Island, to Neil Riley and Grace McEacheran. He was educated at Fanning Grammar School in Malpecque and Charlottetown Normal School. He married Edith Kate Thompson on April 2, 1890, and have five sons together. In 1882 he moved west, first to Winnipeg to work in the Canadian Pacific Railway shops, and later settling in High River, Alberta. He became a ranch hand and manager for William Roper Hull and volunteered as a dispatch rider during the North-West Rebellion.

== Political life ==
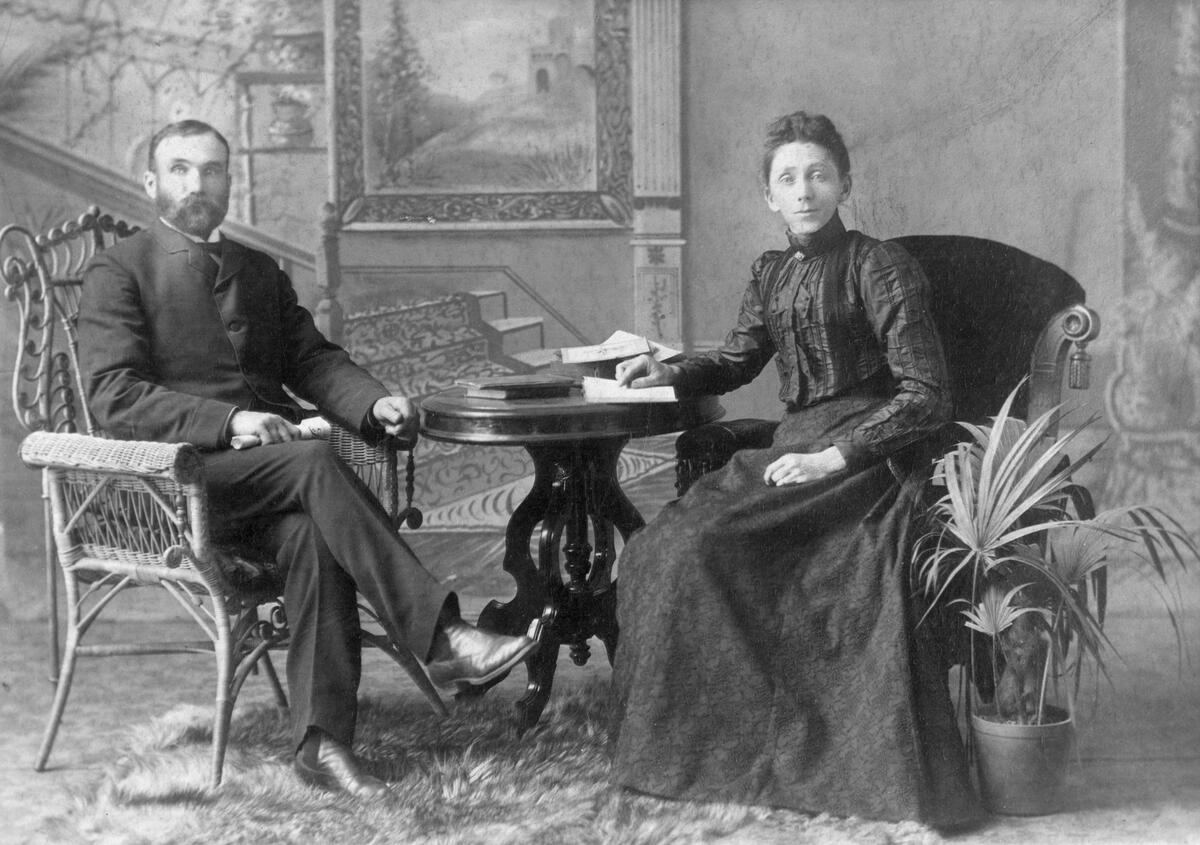
Daniel E. Riley was elected first mayor of High River, in 1906.

Riley served as the first Mayor of High River when the village became a town in 1906. He also served as the founding President of the United Farmers of Alberta High River Local in 1909.

Riley first contested the 1917 Alberta general election in the High River electoral district as a member of the Alberta Liberal Party. He was defeated by incumbent Conservative candidate George Douglas Stanley by 38 votes.

Riley helped to found the Western Stock Growers’ Association and served various positions in the organization from 1921 to 1937.

Riley was appointed to the Senate of Canada on the advice of Mackenzie King on June 26, 1926, and served until his death at Holy Cross Hospital in Calgary, on April 27, 1948.

== Legacy ==
He was inducted into the Canadian Agricultural Hall of Fame posthumously in 1965. The Senator Riley Junior High School in High River is named in his honour.

Parliament of Canada
| Preceded by James Alexander Lougheed | Senator Alberta; 1926–1948 | Succeeded by George Henry Ross |
