= Charles Drain (politician) =

Canadian politician (1913–1991)

Member of the Legislative Assembly of Alberta
- In office 1967–1975
- Preceded by: Garth Turcott
- Succeeded by: Frederick Bradley
- Constituency: Pincher Creek-Crowsnest

Personal details
- Born: January 24, 1913 San Francisco, California, US
- Died: January 27, 1991 (aged 78)
- Political party: Social Credit

Charles Duncan Drain (January 24, 1913 – January 27, 1991) was a Canadian politician. He served in the Legislative Assembly of Alberta from 1967 to 1975 as a member of the Social Credit caucus in both government and opposition.

== Political career ==
Drain first ran for a seat to the Alberta Legislature in the 1967 general election. He defeated incumbent MLA Garth Turcott to pick up the Pincher Creek-Crowsnest electoral district for the governing Social Credit party. In the 1971 general election, he defeated two other candidates. In the 1975 general election, his share of the popular vote fell sharply and he was defeated by Progressive Conservative candidate Fred Bradley.

== Personal life ==
Charles married Mary Michalski and together they had four children, Douglas, Clair, Edmund, and James. Edmund died in 2021.
