= Pincher Creek-Crowsnest =

Defunct provincial electoral district in Alberta, Canada

Coordinates: 49.45°N 114.57°W

Alberta electoral district

Defunct provincial electoral district
- Legislature: Legislative Assembly of Alberta
- District created: 1940
- District abolished: 1993
- First contested: 1940
- Last contested: 1989

Pincher Creek-Crowsnest was a provincial electoral district in Alberta, Canada, mandated to return a single member to the Legislative Assembly of Alberta from 1940 to 1993.

== History ==
Members of the Legislative Assembly for Pincher Creek-Crowsnest
Assembly	Years	Member	Party
See Pincher Creek electoral district from 1905–1940 and Cardston electoral district from 1905-1940
9th	1940–1944	Ernest O. Duke	Social Credit
10th	1944–1948	Ernest O. Duke	Social Credit
11th	1948–1952	William A. Kovach	Social Credit
12th	1952–1955	William A. Kovach	Social Credit
13th	1955–1959	William A. Kovach	Social Credit
14th	1959–1963	William A. Kovach	Social Credit
15th	1963–1966	William A. Kovach	Social Credit
15th	1966–1967	Garth A. Turcott	New Democratic
16th	1967–1971	Charles Duncan Drain	Social Credit
17th	1971–1975	Charles Duncan Drain	Social Credit
18th	1975–1979	Frederick Deryl Bradley	Progressive Conservative
19th	1979–1982	Frederick Deryl Bradley	Progressive Conservative
20th	1982–1986	Frederick Deryl Bradley	Progressive Conservative
21st	1986–1989	Frederick Deryl Bradley	Progressive Conservative
22nd	1989–1993	Frederick Deryl Bradley	Progressive Conservative
See Pincher Creek-Macleod electoral district from 1993-1997

The Pincher Creek-Crowsnest electoral district was formed prior to the 1940 Alberta general election from the Pincher Creek and Rocky Mountain electoral districts.

From 1940 to 1956, the district used instant-runoff voting to elect its MLA.

The Pincher Creek-Crowsnest electoral district was abolished in the 1993 electoral district re-distribution, and merged with portions of Macleod and Highwood electoral districts to form Pincher Creek-Macleod.

== Election results ==
=== 1940 ===
1940 Alberta general election
Party	Candidate	Votes 1st count	%	Votes final count	±%
Social Credit	Ernest O. Duke	2,356	42.59%	2,443	–
Independent	C.J. Tompkins	2,129	38.49%	2,210	–
Dominion Labor	Enoch Williams	1,047	18.93%	–	–
Total		5,532	–	–	–
Rejected, spoiled and declined		195	–	–	–
Eligible electors / turnout		6,650	86.12%	–	–
Social Credit pickup new district.					
Source(s) Source: "Pincher Creek-Crowsnest Official Results 1940 Alberta general election". Alberta Heritage Community Foundation. Instant-runoff voting requires a candidate to receive a plurality (greater than 50%) of the votes. As no candidate received a plurality of votes, the bottom candidate was eliminated and their 2nd place votes were applied to both other candidates until one received a plurality.

=== 1944 ===
1944 Alberta general election
Party	Candidate	Votes 1st count	%	Votes final count	±%
Social Credit	Ernest O. Duke	2,109	43.40%	2,228	0.82%
Labour United	Enoch Williams	1,788	36.80%	1,870	–
Co-operative Commonwealth	W.H. Irwin	962	19.80%	–	–
Total		4,859	–	–	–
Rejected, spoiled and declined		50	–	–	–
Eligible electors / turnout		6,703	73.24%	-12.88%	–
Social Credit hold		Swing		1.25%	
Source(s) Source: "Pincher Creek-Crowsnest Official Results 1944 Alberta general election". Alberta Heritage Community Foundation. Instant-runoff voting requires a candidate to receive a plurality (greater than 50%) of the votes. As no candidate received a plurality of votes, the bottom candidate was eliminated and their 2nd place votes were applied to both other candidates until one received a plurality.

=== 1948 ===
1948 Alberta general election
Party	Candidate	Votes 1st count	%	Votes final count	±%
Social Credit	William A. Kovach	2,210	45.30%	2,292	1.89%
Liberal	J. W. Rutherford	998	20.46%	1,045	–
Labor-Progressive	B. R. Swankey	856	17.54%	–	–
Co-operative Commonwealth	John Lloyd	815	16.70%	–	-3.09%
Total		4,879	–	–	–
Rejected, spoiled and declined		498	–	–	–
Eligible electors / turnout		7,465	72.03%	-1.21%	–
Social Credit hold		Swing		9.12%	
Source(s) Source: "Pincher Creek-Crowsnest Official Results 1948 Alberta general election". Alberta Heritage Community Foundation. Instant-runoff voting requires a candidate to receive a plurality (greater than 50%) of the votes. As no candidate received a plurality of votes, the bottom candidate was eliminated and their 2nd place votes were applied to both other candidates until one received a plurality.

=== 1952 ===
1952 Alberta general election
Party	Candidate	Votes	%	±%
Social Credit	William A. Kovach	3,207	76.09%	30.79%
Liberal	Thomas J. Costigan	1,008	23.91%	3.46%
Total		4,215	–	–
Rejected, spoiled and declined		429	–	–
Eligible electors / turnout		7,446	62.37%	-9.66%
Social Credit hold		Swing		13.66%
Source(s) Source: "Pincher Creek-Crowsnest Official Results 1952 Alberta general election". Alberta Heritage Community Foundation.

=== 1955 ===
1955 Alberta general election
Party	Candidate	Votes	%	±%
Social Credit	William A. Kovach	2,799	61.44%	-14.65%
Liberal–Conservative	H. Ferguson	1,394	30.60%	–
Labor-Progressive	B. R. Swankey	363	7.97%	–
Total		4,556	–	–
Rejected, spoiled and declined		288	–	–
Eligible electors / turnout		6,614	73.24%	10.87%
Social Credit hold		Swing		-10.67%
Source(s) Source: "Pincher Creek-Crowsnest Official Results 1955 Alberta general election". Alberta Heritage Community Foundation.

=== 1959 ===
1959 Alberta general election
Party	Candidate	Votes	%	±%
Social Credit	William A. Kovach	3,145	67.09%	5.65%
Progressive Conservative	Alex Grant	1,133	24.17%	–
Liberal	C. Boyden	410	8.75%	–
Total		4,688	–	–
Rejected, spoiled and declined		14	–	–
Eligible electors / turnout		6,280	74.87%	1.63%
Social Credit hold		Swing		6.04%
Source(s) Source: "Pincher Creek-Crowsnest Official Results 1959 Alberta general election". Alberta Heritage Community Foundation.

=== 1963 ===
1963 Alberta general election
Party	Candidate	Votes	%	±%
Social Credit	William A. Kovach	2,524	54.43%	-12.65%
Progressive Conservative	Frank Lynch-Staunton	953	20.55%	-3.62%
New Democratic	Arthur Lees	621	13.39%	–
Liberal	Thomas J. Costigan	539	11.62%	2.88%
Total		4,637	–	–
Rejected, spoiled and declined		11	–	–
Eligible electors / turnout		6,847	67.88%	-6.99%
Social Credit hold		Swing		-4.52%
Source(s) Source: "Pincher Creek-Crowsnest Official Results 1963 Alberta general election". Alberta Heritage Community Foundation.

=== 1966 by-election ===
Alberta provincial by-election, October 6, 1966 Upon the death of William A. Kovach
Party	Candidate	Votes	%	±%
New Democratic	Garth A. Turcott	1,767	34.53%	21.14%
Social Credit	J. H. Hanrahan	1,631	31.87%	-22.56%
Progressive Conservative	Alexander B. Wells	951	18.59%	-1.96%
Liberal	F. Benton Murphy	768	15.01%	3.39%
Total valid votes		5,117	–	–
Rejected, spoiled, and declined		–	–	–
Electors / turnout		–	–	–
New Democratic gain from Social Credit		Swing		N/A
Source(s) "By-elections". Elections Alberta.

=== 1967 ===
1967 Alberta general election
Party	Candidate	Votes	%	±%
Social Credit	Charles Duncan Drain	2,345	46.03%	15.16%
New Democratic	Garth A. Turcott	1,772	34.79%	0.26%
Progressive Conservative	Alexander B. Wells	722	14.17%	-4.42%
Liberal	F. Benton Murphy	255	5.01%	-10.00%
Total		5,094	–	–
Rejected, spoiled and declined		28	–	–
Eligible electors / turnout		6,574	77.91%	10.03%
Social Credit gain from New Democratic		Swing		N/A
Source(s) Source: "Pincher Creek-Crowsnest Official Results 1967 Alberta general election". Alberta Heritage Community Foundation.

=== 1971 ===
1971 Alberta general election
Party	Candidate	Votes	%	±%
Social Credit	Charles Duncan Drain	2,379	43.06%	-2.98%
Progressive Conservative	Morgan Johnson	1,791	32.42%	18.24%
New Democratic	Clarence W. Smith	1,355	24.52%	-10.26%
Total		5,525	–	–
Rejected, spoiled and declined		31	–	–
Eligible electors / turnout		7,284	76.28%	-1.64%
Social Credit hold		Swing		-0.30%
Source(s) Source: "Pincher Creek-Crowsnest Official Results 1971 Alberta general election". Alberta Heritage Community Foundation.

=== 1975 ===
1975 Alberta general election
Party	Candidate	Votes	%	±%
Progressive Conservative	Frederick Deryl Bradley	3,209	60.21%	27.79%
Social Credit	Charles Drain	1,837	34.47%	-8.59%
New Democratic	David Elliot	235	4.41%	-20.12%
Independent	Gwen Gyulai	49	0.92%	–
Total		5,330	–	–
Rejected, spoiled and declined		35	–	–
Eligible electors / turnout		7,488	71.65%	-4.63%
Progressive Conservative gain from Social Credit		Swing		7.55%
Source(s) Source: "Pincher Creek-Crowsnest Official Results 1975 Alberta general election". Alberta Heritage Community Foundation.

=== 1979 ===
1979 Alberta general election
Party	Candidate	Votes	%	±%
Progressive Conservative	Frederick Deryl Bradley	3,567	60.67%	0.47%
Social Credit	Robert (Bob) Westrop	1,503	25.57%	-8.90%
New Democratic	Ian Downie	628	10.68%	6.27%
Liberal	Ann Gill	181	3.08%	–
Total		5,879	–	–
Rejected, spoiled and declined		24	–	–
Eligible electors / turnout		8,788	67.17%	-4.48%
Progressive Conservative hold		Swing		4.68%
Source(s) Source: "Pincher Creek-Crowsnest Official Results 1979 Alberta general election". Alberta Heritage Community Foundation.

=== 1982 ===
1982 Alberta general election
Party	Candidate	Votes	%	±%
Progressive Conservative	Frederick Deryl Bradley	4,388	64.69%	4.02%
New Democratic	Mike Cooper	1,636	24.12%	13.44%
Western Canada Concept	Dennis Olson	650	9.58%	–
Liberal	Jerry Potts	109	1.61%	-1.47%
Total		6,783	–	–
Rejected, spoiled and declined		18	–	–
Eligible electors / turnout		9,188	74.02%	6.85%
Progressive Conservative hold		Swing		2.73%
Source(s) Source: "Pincher Creek-Crowsnest Official Results 1982 Alberta general election". Alberta Heritage Community Foundation.

=== 1986 ===
1986 Alberta general election
Party	Candidate	Votes	%	±%
Progressive Conservative	Frederick Deryl Bradley	3,134	51.53%	-13.16%
New Democratic	Mike Cooper	2,948	48.47%	24.35%
Total		6,082	–	–
Rejected, spoiled and declined		21	–	–
Eligible electors / turnout		9,251	65.97%	-8.05%
Progressive Conservative hold		Swing		-18.76%
Source(s) Source: "Pincher Creek-Crowsnest Official Results 1986 Alberta general election". Alberta Heritage Community Foundation.

=== 1989 ===
1989 Alberta general election
Party	Candidate	Votes	%	±%
Progressive Conservative	Frederick Deryl Bradley	3,262	52.68%	1.15%
New Democratic	Mike Cooper	2,119	34.22%	-14.25%
Liberal	Stan Stoklosa	811	13.10%	–
Total		6,192	–	–
Rejected, spoiled and declined		14	–	–
Eligible electors / turnout		9,044	68.62%	2.65%
Progressive Conservative hold		Swing		7.70%
Source(s) Source: "Pincher Creek-Crowsnest Official Results 1989 Alberta general election". Alberta Heritage Community Foundation.

== Plebiscite results ==
=== 1957 liquor plebiscite ===
1957 Alberta liquor plebiscite results: Pincher Creek-Crowsnest
Question A: Do you approve additional types of outlets for the sale of beer, wine and spirituous liquor subject to a local vote?
Ballot choice	Votes	%
Yes	1,656	65.87%
No	858	34.13%
Total votes	2,514	100%
Rejected, spoiled and declined	9	
6,009 eligible electors, turnout 41.99%

On October 30, 1957, a stand-alone plebiscite was held province wide in all 50 of the then current provincial electoral districts in Alberta. The government decided to consult Alberta voters to decide on liquor sales and mixed drinking after a divisive debate in the legislature. The plebiscite was intended to deal with the growing demand for reforming antiquated liquor control laws.

The plebiscite was conducted in two parts. Question A, asked in all districts, asked the voters if the sale of liquor should be expanded in Alberta, while Question B, asked in a handful of districts within the corporate limits of Calgary and Edmonton, asked if men and women should be allowed to drink together in establishments.

Province wide Question A of the plebiscite passed in 33 of the 50 districts while Question B passed in all five districts. Pincher Creek-Crowsnest voted in favour of the proposal with a near landslide majority. Voter turnout in the district was poor, as it fell significantly below the province wide average of 46%.

Official district returns were released to the public on December 31, 1957. The Social Credit government in power at the time did not consider the results binding. However the results of the vote led the government to repeal all existing liquor legislation and introduce an entirely new Liquor Act.

Municipal districts lying inside electoral districts that voted against the plebiscite were designated Local Option Zones by the Alberta Liquor Control Board and considered effective dry zones. Business owners who wanted a licence had to petition for a binding municipal plebiscite in order to be granted a licence.

== See also ==
- List of Alberta provincial electoral districts
- Canadian provincial electoral districts
- Pincher Creek, a town in southern Alberta
