= Ernest Duke =

Canadian politician (1880–1947)

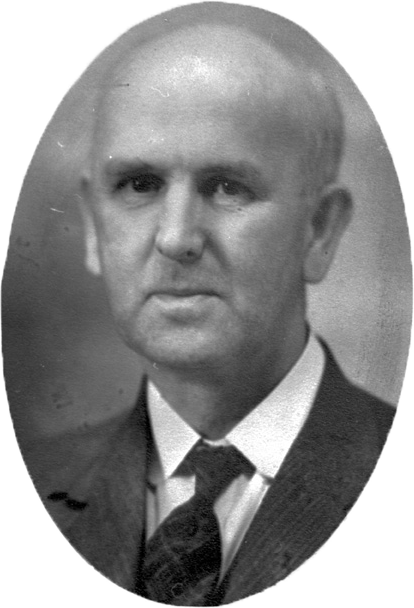

Member of the Legislative Assembly of Alberta
- In office 1935–1940
- Preceded by: George Edward Cruickshank
- Succeeded by: District abolished
- Constituency: Rocky Mountain
- In office 1940–1948
- Preceded by: District established
- Succeeded by: William Kovach
- Constituency: Pincher Creek-Crowsnest

Personal details
- Born: December 21, 1880 Mono Mills, Albion Township, Peel County, Ontario
- Died: January 19, 1954 (aged 73) Victoria, British Columbia
- Party: Social Credit

Lawrence Ernest Oscar Duke (December 21, 1880 – January 19, 1954) was a provincial politician from Alberta, Canada. He served as a member of the Legislative Assembly of Alberta from 1935 to 1948, sitting with the Social Credit caucus in government.
