= George Edward Cruickshank =

Canadian politician (1877–1962)

Member of the Legislative Assembly of Alberta
- In office June 19, 1930 – August 22, 1935
- Preceded by: Philip Christophers
- Succeeded by: Ernest Duke
- Constituency: Rocky Mountain

Personal details
- Born: March 13, 1877 near Fara, Ontario
- Died: August 30, 1962 (aged 85) Blairmore, Alberta
- Party: Independent
- Occupation: politician

George Edward Cruickshank (March 13, 1877 – August 30, 1962) was a provincial politician from Alberta, Canada. He served as a member of the Legislative Assembly of Alberta from 1930 to 1935 sitting as an Independent.

== Political career ==
Cruickshank ran for a seat to the Alberta Legislature in the 1930 Alberta general election as an independent candidate. He defeated two other candidates with a solid majority to win the seat.

Cruickshank ran for a second term in office in the 1935 Alberta general election. He was defeated by Social Credit candidate Ernest Duke finishing a distant fourth place in the field of four candidates.
