= Daniel Morkeberg =

Canadian politician (1870–1963)

Daniel Joakim Morkeberg

Member of the Legislative Assembly of Alberta
- In office June 7, 1917 – July 18, 1921
- Preceded by: Fred Archer
- Succeeded by: Donald Cameron
- Constituency: Innisfail

Personal details
- Born: August 2, 1870 Kjoge, Denmark
- Died: January 28, 1963 (aged 92) Markerville, Alberta
- Party: Liberal
- Occupation: farmer and politician

Daniel Joakim Morkeberg (August 2, 1870 – January 28, 1963) was a politician and dairy farmer from Alberta, Canada. He served in the Legislative Assembly of Alberta from 1917 to 1921 as a member of the Liberal Party.

== Early life ==
Born Mørkeberg in Denmark, he was one of eight children by Carl Vilhelm Mørkeberg (1824-1890), tenant farmer of Christiansminde, parish of Beldringe, municipality of Vordingborg, and Caroline Christine Seidenfaden (1833-1914). He was a soldier in the Royal Life Guards (Den Kongelige Livgarde) 1888-1890, and emigrated to western Canada in 1898. In Alberta he became a pioneer in the development of the dairy industry in the province. He was a leader in the movement to unionize dairymen and served as the first president of the Alberta Dairyman's Association in 1919. His brother, Adam Wilhelm Mørkeberg (1863-1933), was Chairman of the Danish veterinary association (Den Danske Dyrlægeforening) and was awarded a number of knighthoods, in Denmark (order of Dannebrog), Finland (White Rose), Norway (St. Olav's order), Sweden (Vasa order) as well as the French Merit Agricole.

== Political career ==
Morkeberg ran for a seat to the Legislative Assembly of Alberta in the 1917 general election as the Liberal candidate in Innisfail. He defeated incumbent Fred Archer and an independent candidate to pick up the seat for his party.

Morkeberg was defeated in the 1921 general election by United Farmers candidate Donald Cameron in a landslide. He ran again in the 1926 general election and lost in the second count. He faced Cameron once more in the 1930 general election and once again lost in the second count.

== Late life ==
In 1959 Morkeberg was elected to the Alberta Agriculture Hall of Fame.
