= Robert Campbell (Alberta politician) =

Canadian politician (1871–1965)

Robert Eldon Campbell
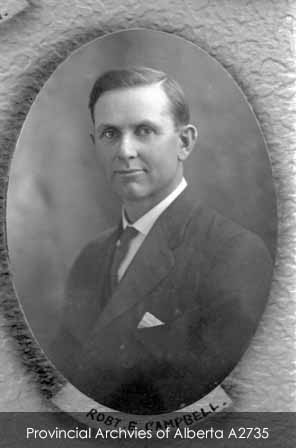

Member of the Legislative Assembly of Alberta
- In office April 17, 1913 – July 18, 1921
- Preceded by: Charles O'Brien
- Succeeded by: Philip Christophers
- Constituency: Rocky Mountain

Personal details
- Born: August 15, 1871 Montague, Ontario
- Died: May 5, 1965 (aged 93)
- Party: Conservative
- Occupation: politician

Military service
- Allegiance: Canada
- Rank: Captain
- Unit: 192nd Battalion
- Battles/wars: World War I

Robert Eldon Campbell (August 15, 1871 – May 5, 1965) was a provincial politician from Alberta, Canada. He served as a member of the Legislative Assembly of Alberta from 1917 to 1921 sitting with the Conservative caucus in opposition.

== Political career ==
Campbell ran for the Alberta Legislature for the first time in the 1913 Alberta general election. He ran as a Conservative candidate and defeated High-profile MLA Charles M. O'Brien in an upset victory. O'Brien at the time was leader of the Socialists. The 1913 election was a three-cornered affair. Campbell beat out O'Brien by a very close margin of 81 votes, the Liberal candidate taking 516 votes.

As MLA, he is said to have assisted suffragists to take over the Legislature when they staged a sit-in to get attention in February 1915.

Campbell was acclaimed to a second term in office in the 1917 Alberta general election. He was acclaimed under Section 38 of the Elections Act that stipulates that a member of the Legislative Assembly may not face a contested election and be automatically returned to his district while he is fighting overseas in World War I.

Campbell left provincial politics at the end of his second term in 1921, and attempted to run for Federal politics in the 1921 Canadian federal election as the Conservative Candidate in the federal electoral district of Edmonton West. He finished a very distant 3rd place behind Progressive candidate Donald Kennedy and Liberal Frank Oliver.

He authored his memoirs I Would Do It Again (Ryerson Press, 1959).
