= Charles M. O'Brien =

Canadian politician (1875–1952)

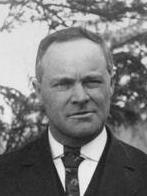

Member of the Legislative Assembly of Alberta
- In office March 1909 – March 1913
- Succeeded by: Robert E. Campbell
- Constituency: Rocky Mountain

Personal details
- Born: March 2, 1875 Bell Rapids, Ontario, Canada
- Died: February 23, 1952 (aged 76) Los Angeles County, California
- Party: Socialist Party of Canada (Alberta)
- Occupation: Activist, politician, former railway worker, miner, logger

Charles Macnamara (Charlie) O'Brien (March 2, 1875 – February 23, 1952) was a Canadian socialist activist and politician in Alberta, Canada. Sitting under the label of the Socialist Party of Canada, he served in the Legislative Assembly of Alberta from 1909 to 1913.

== His years in Canada ==
O'Brien was born at Bell Rapids, near Bangor, Hastings County, Ontario, to John Patrick and Matilda (née Price) O'Brien; his father perished in the sinking of the boat, the Mayflower, on the Madawaska River in 1912. Charles O'Brien worked in the logging and mining industries and in railroad camps. In 1899, he came west to Alberta while working as a laborer on the Crowsnest Pass line of the Canadian Pacific Railway.

A dedicated socialist, he joined the Socialist Party of Canada and became a national organizer for the party, and leader of its Alberta branch.

O'Brien was a skilled orator and author, drawing comparisons to prominent activists such as Bill Haywood, Jack London and Eugene V. Debs.

In 1909, O'Brien ran for a seat in the Legislative Assembly of Alberta in the new Rocky Mountain constituency. Despite not garnering official union support, he attracted wide support among the district's coal-miners. He was elected to the Legislative Assembly as a member of the Socialist Party of Alberta, narrowly defeating Liberal John Angus Macdonald by 32 votes. The first Socialist elected to the legislature, the vote "reflected a growing radicalization" among Alberta coal miners, O'Brien's core constituency.

The local newspaper, Coleman Miner, claimed O'Brien's election was engineered by his supporters through their manipulation of the immigrant vote:

The election just past goes to show just what little interest was taken in the affairs of the province by the thinking people, especially the votes of the Rocky riding. The Socialists deserve great credit for the way every man of them got out and hustled; also the supporters of the Independent who were made up of, principally, the working classes—including Dagos and Slavs who neither read, write, or speak, our language. These people are herded to the polls like so many cattle and voted according to instructions from their leaders who are paid well for the service rendered. The services of these men are always at the disposal of the highest bidder. Surely this is a disgraceful state of affairs, never-the-less true.

— The Coleman Miner, March 26, 1909

During his term in office, he worked to improve the working conditions of miners. In December 1910, he introduced an amendment to the existing Coal Mines Act, proposing many additional safety measures in the industry. O'Brien also initiated a bill permitting the Alberta government to protect an apparent Russian fugitive (charged with murder for assassination of a Russian governor and arson) by refusing to extradite him back to Russia if investigation showed that he faced political persecution back in Russia.

He was a colourful member of the legislative assembly. He also participated in the Alberta and Great Waterways Railway debate and set a provincial legislative record for filibustering with a speech to the house on February 13, 1912, that lasted five hours and fifty minutes; he still had not finished when the session was adjourned late at night. That issue forced the resignation of Premier Rutherford. That same week, the legislature marked the death of King Edward VII. When other members of the legislature made speeches of condolence to the royal family, O'Brien stood up and said, "Why all this empty hypocrisy? The king was a man who worked little and ate well." He moved an amendment that would have had the legislature also memorialize the victims of a recent coal mine disaster. The other members indecorously pelted him with papers and other objects.

While in office, he continued his socialist activities. In 1909, he was arrested while giving a speech near a highway in Regina. A crowd of 500 had gathered, which resulted in O'Brien's arrest for obstructing traffic. In 1911, he made a Canada-wide tour to promote socialist ideals.

The Trades and Labour Congress of Canada endorsed O'Brien when he ran for re-election in 1913.

In the 1913 general election, he doubled his vote as compared to 1909, but was nevertheless defeated by Conservative Robert E. Campbell by just over 80 votes.

== His years in the U.S. ==
In 1915, O'Brien moved to Los Angeles, California, In 1917, he addressed large gatherings of socialists in Detroit.

He was active in socialist politics in Rochester, New York in 1919. He and five other activists were arrested in December 1919 and faced charges of "criminal anarchy".

He died in Los Angeles in 1952.

== Electoral history ==
| 1909 Alberta general election results (Rocky Mountain) | | Turnout N.A. | |
| Socialist | Charles M. O'Brien | 555 | 37.83% |
| Liberal | John Angus Macdonald | 520 | 35.45% |
| Progressive Conservative | H.E. Lyon | 392 | 26.72% |

| 1913 Alberta general election results (Rocky Mountain) | | Turnout N.A. | |
| Progressive Conservative | Robert E. Campbell | 1099 | 43.56% |
| Socialist | Charles M. O'Brien | 1018 | 40.34% |
| Liberal | William B. Powell | 516 | 20.45% |

== Footnotes ==
Legislative Assembly of Alberta
| Preceded by New District | MLA Rocky Mountain; 1909–1913 | Succeeded by Robert Campbell |
