= Samuel Brown (Alberta politician) =

Canadian politician (1872–1962)

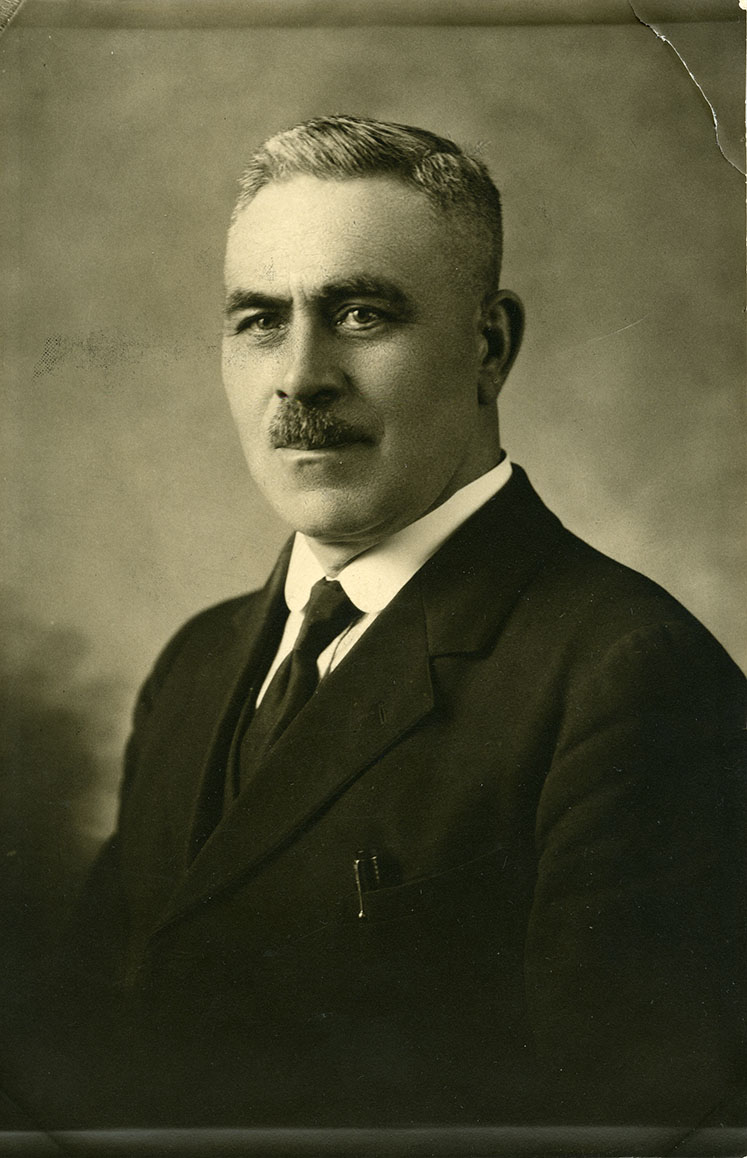

Member of the Legislative Assembly of Alberta
- In office July 18, 1921 – June 19, 1930
- Preceded by: George Stanley
- Succeeded by: District Abolished
- Constituency: High River

Personal details
- Born: 11 November 1872 Ballymoney, County Antrim, Northern Ireland
- Died: 6 May 1962 (aged 89) High River, Alberta
- Party: United Farmers
- Occupation: politician

Samuel Brown (11 November 1872 – 6 May 1962) was a provincial politician from Alberta, Canada. He served as a member of the Legislative Assembly of Alberta from 1921 to 1930 sitting with the United Farmers caucus in government.

== Political career ==
Brown ran for a seat to the Alberta Legislature in the 1921 Alberta general election. He contested the electoral district of High River as a United Farmers candidate and won a tight two-way race over Liberal candidate J.V. Drumheller to pick up the seat for his party.

Brown ran for a second term in the 1926 Alberta general election. He won the three-way race with a landslide majority.

The 1930 boundary redistribution would see High River abolished, Brown did not seek re-election and retired at dissolution in 1930.
