= John A. Simpson =

Canadian politician and businessman

John Adrian Simpson
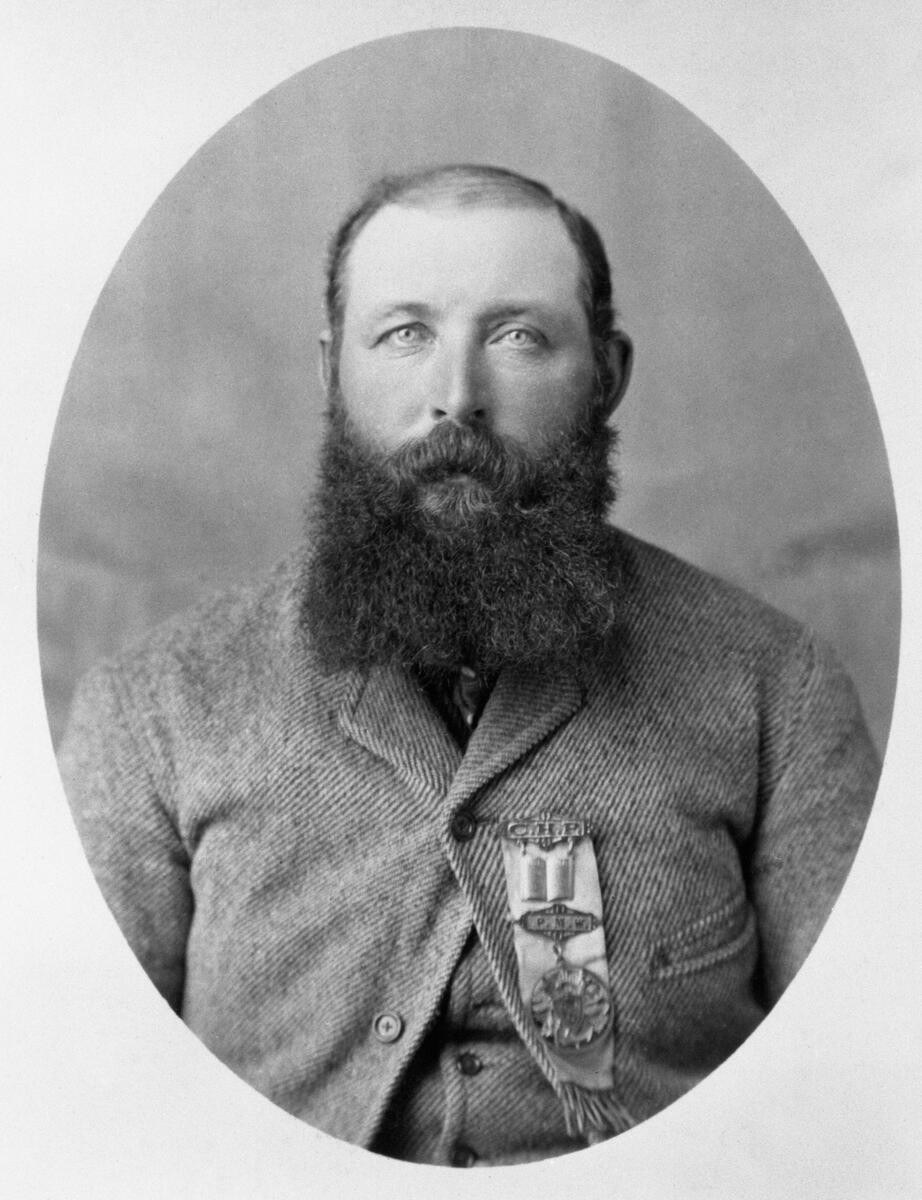

Member of the Legislative Assembly of Alberta
- In office November 2, 1905 – April 17, 1913
- Preceded by: New district
- Succeeded by: Fred W. Archer
- Constituency: Innisfail

Member of the Legislative Assembly of the Northwest Territories
- In office May 21, 1902 – September 1, 1905
- Preceded by: New district
- Succeeded by: District abolished
- Constituency: Innisfail
- In office October 31, 1894 – May 21, 1902
- Preceded by: Francis Wilkins
- Succeeded by: District abolished
- Constituency: Red Deer

Personal details
- Born: August 20, 1854 Peel County, Canada West
- Died: September 11, 1916 (aged 62) Innisfail, Alberta
- Party: Liberal
- Spouse: Anna Proudfoot
- Children: Five
- Occupation: Lumberman

John Adrian Simpson (August 20, 1854 – September 11, 1916) was a Canadian politician and businessman. Born in Peel County, Canada West, he came west in 1890 and eventually settled in Innisfail, where he opened a lumberyard. He served on Innisfail's first town council, and also in the legislative assemblies of the Northwest Territories and later Alberta; in the last, he acted as deputy speaker.

== Early life ==
John Simpson was born in 1854 in Peel County, Ontario. He married Anna Proudfoot in 1879, before coming west to Calgary in 1890. Shortly after, he moved to the Olds area, and in 1891 he settled in Innisfail where he started a lumberyard the next year.

== Political career ==
Besides being a member of Innisfail's first town council, Simpson sought election to the Legislative Assembly of the Northwest Territories in the 1894 election in the district of Red Deer. He defeated two candidates, including incumbent Francis Wilkins, and was subsequently re-elected in the 1898 and 1902 elections, on the latter occasion in the new district of Innisfail. He continued to serve in the legislature until his riding became part of the new province of Alberta in 1905.

Simpson ran in Alberta's first provincial election in Innisfail as the Liberal candidate, and was elected over Conservative Sam Curry by a single vote—the narrowest margin of any race in the election. In the Legislative Assembly of Alberta, Simpson served as deputy speaker. During the Alberta and Great Waterways Railway scandal, he remained loyal to the government of Premier Alexander Cameron Rutherford in the face of a rebellion from Liberal insurgents. There was some concern on the government side that the speaker, Charles W. Fisher, would resign to support the insurgents; Simpson's elevation to speaker, a position which was expected to remain impartial, would rob the government of a crucial vote. After Rutherford's government fell, Simpson supported the successor government of Liberal Arthur Sifton, though its stance on the issue that had toppled Rutherford's government—the construction of the Alberta and Great Waterways Railway—was in many respects diametrically opposed to Rutherford's.

Though he was re-elected in the 1909 election, in 1913 Simpson was defeated by Conservative Fred W. Archer. He did not re-enter political life. He died suddenly at his Innisfail home on September 11, 1916, and was buried at the Innisfail Cemetery.

== Electoral record ==
1913 Alberta general election results (Innisfail)		Turnout N.A.	
Conservative	Fred W. Archer	535	50.42%
Liberal	John A. Simpson	526	49.58%
1909 Alberta general election results (Innisfail)		Turnout N.A.	
Liberal	John A. Simpson	519	53.45%
Conservative	G. W. West	452	46.55%
1905 Alberta general election results (Innisfail)		Turnout N.A.	
Liberal	John A. Simpson	408	50.06%
Conservative	Sam J. Curry	407	49.94%
1902 Northwest Territories general election results (Innisfail)		Turnout N.A.	
	John A. Simpson	227	52.42%
	John D. Lauder	206	47.58%
1898 Northwest Territories general election results (Red Deer)		Turnout N.A.	
	John A. Simpson	349	46.10%
	George Wellington Greene	253	33.42%
	J. Speakman	155	20.48%
1894 Northwest Territories general election results (Red Deer)		Turnout N.A.	
	John A. Simpson	282	37.55%
	Leonard Gaetz	257	34.22%
	Francis Wilkins	212	28.23%
