= Socialist Party of Alberta =

Defunct socialist party in Alberta, Canada

The Socialist Party of Alberta was a provincial branch of the Socialist Party of Canada. The party formed out of a socialist movement that began with miners in the District of Alberta, Northwest Territories.

== 1908 Federal Election ==
F.H. Sherman of the Socialist Party was put forward as a candidate in this election.

As well, J. George Anderson ran on a strongly-socialist platform when he ran in this election as an Independent (farmers) candidate in the riding of Strathcona. His platform included this statement: "railroads, mines, forests, factories and such other public utilities and necessities that cannot be operated individually [by one person] must be taken over and operated by the state in the best interests of the people. We would have this but for the fact that the corporate interests control the big papers and thus queer public opinion."

== 1909 election ==
Socialist Party of Canada activists in Alberta came together with various Labor groups in the province of Alberta and ran two candidates for the first time under the Socialist banner in the 1909 Alberta general election.

George Howell ran as a Socialist in the city of Calgary; however, his run was unsuccessful.

Despite the two candidates being up against candidates belonging to the popular Liberal government led by Alexander Rutherford, the SPC made a breakthrough by electing its leader, Charles M. O'Brien, to the Legislative Assembly of Alberta in the electoral district of Rocky Mountain, which was heavily dominated by radical coalminers.

O'Brien won a tight race due to high voter turnout in the mining camps.

== Defeat and decline ==
The party was not very well organized or funded but did run six candidates in the 1913 Alberta general election, electing none of them. Sitting MLA Charles O'Brien was defeated by Conservative candidate Robert Campbell. O'Brien doubled his vote from the previous election, but the collapse of the Liberal vote in the constituency allowed the Conservative to win. The other candidates barely made a showing.

The party also ran candidates in 1917, but made little impact.

Many of them went on to join the Dominion Labour Party (founded in 1919) and the Canadian Labour Party (founded in 1921).

Some became members of the Communist parties being established around 1920. Charles O'Brien helped found the Communist Party of the USA.
