= Francis Wilkins =

Canadian politician

Francis Edward Wilkins

Member of the Legislative Assembly of the Northwest Territories
- In office 1891–1894
- Preceded by: Robert Brett
- Succeeded by: John A. Simpson
- Constituency: Red Deer

Personal details
- Born: 1864 St. Louis, Missouri
- Died: 1908 (aged 43–44) Lacombe, Alberta, Canada

Francis Edward Wilkins (1864 in St. Louis, Missouri – March 10, 1908 in Lacombe, Alberta) was a politician in Northwest Territories, Canada.

Francis moved with his family to a homestead near Red Deer in 1890.

Francis was acclaimed to the Legislative Assembly of Northwest Territories in the 1891 Northwest Territories general election after the incumbent, Robert Brett, decided to run in the new Banff riding.

After serving one term, Francis was defeated in the 1894 Northwest Territories general election, finishing last in a three-way contest.

Francis ran for mayor in the 1905 mayoral race for the city of Red Deer, Alberta Francis was defeated by incumbent Mayor Edward Michener by 8 votes.

He died in 1908.

Preceded by Robert Brett	MLA Red Deer; 1891–1894	Succeeded by John A. Simpson
