= Innisfail (territorial electoral district) =

Former territorial electoral district in the North-West Territories, Canada

Northwest Territories electoral district

Defunct territorial electoral district
- Legislature: Legislative Assembly of the Northwest Territories
- District created: 1902
- District abolished: 1905
- First contested: 1902
- Last contested: 1902

Innisfail was a territorial electoral district in the North-West Territories, Canada, mandated to return a single member to the Legislative Assembly of the Northwest Territories from 1902 to 1905.

== History ==
The district was named after the town of Innisfail.

Innisfail would continue as the Innisfail electoral district, one of the 25 original electoral districts contested in the 1905 Alberta general election upon Alberta joining Confederation in September, 1905.

== Election results 1902 ==
1902 North-West Territories general election
Party	Candidate	Votes	%
Liberal–Conservative	John A. Simpson	227	52.42
Liberal	John D. Lauder	206	47.58
Total valid votes		433	100.00

== See also ==
- List of Northwest Territories territorial electoral districts
- Canadian provincial electoral districts
