= Alban MacLellan =

Canadian politician (1902–1968)

Alban Erskine MacLellan
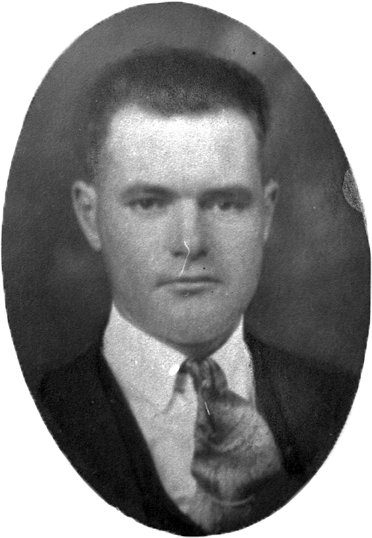

Member of the Legislative Assembly of Alberta
- In office August 22, 1935 – March 21, 1940
- Preceded by: Donald Cameron
- Succeeded by: District Abolished
- Constituency: Innisfail

Personal details
- Born: February 9, 1902 Indian River, Prince Edward Island, Canada
- Died: December 20, 1968 (aged 66) Elnora, Alberta, Canada
- Party: Social Credit
- Occupation: railway foreman and politician

Alban Erskine MacLellan (February 9, 1902 – December 20, 1968) was a railway foreman and a provincial politician from Alberta, Canada. He served as a member of the Legislative Assembly of Alberta from 1935 to 1940 sitting, with the Social Credit caucus in government.

== Political career ==
MacLellan ran for a seat in the Alberta Legislature as a Social Credit candidate in the electoral district of Innisfail for the 1935 Alberta general election. The election used instant-runoff voting and he won a majority on the first round of counting, defeating three other candidates to pick up the seat for his party.

In 1939, he moved to sit as an Independent-Progressive. MacLellan ran for nomination as an Independent Progressive candidate and was nominated as a candidate at a convention on July 19, 1939. The 1940 boundary redistribution abolished the Innisfail electoral district, along with other districts whose representatives had gone against the Social Credit party line.

He ran for a second term in the Legislature, in the 1940 Alberta general election in the Red Deer provincial electoral district. He was unsuccessful, placing last on the first count and being eliminated in the second count. He lost to a former UFA member of Parliament, Independent candidate Alfred Speakman.

MacLellan ran for a seat in the House of Commons of Canada in the federal electoral district of Red Deer in the 1945 Canadian federal election as a Co-operative Commonwealth Federation candidate. He placed third in the field of five candidates and was defeated by incumbent Frederick Shaw .
