= William Kovach =

Canadian politician (1909–1966)

Member of the Legislative Assembly of Alberta
- In office August 17, 1948 – August 4, 1966
- Preceded by: Ernest Duke
- Succeeded by: Garth Turcott
- Constituency: Pincher Creek-Crowsnest

Personal details
- Born: William August Kovach; January 30, 1909 Crowsnest Pass, Alberta, Canada
- Died: August 4, 1966 (aged 57) Lost Creek, Alberta, Canada
- Party: Social Credit
- Occupation: Politician, miner, construction worker, trapper, rancher, trucker, salesman, taxi driver

William August Kovach (January 30, 1909 – August 4, 1966) was a politician from Alberta, Canada. He served in the Legislative Assembly of Alberta from 1948 until his death in 1966 as a member of the Social Credit caucus in government.

== Early life ==
William August Kovach was born on January 30, 1909, in Passburg, Alberta, which became part of the Crowsnest Pass municipality. After completing grade school in Passburg he worked on various construction crews, grading for railways and highways in southern Alberta and Saskatchewan.

In 1926, Kovach started working in a coal mine in Bellevue, Alberta. He left the mines to become a prospector. He supplemented his income by driving a taxi and trapping animals for fur. Kovach began working at the Hillcrest-Mowhawk Mines in Hillcrest, Alberta. He became a part time recording secretary for the United Mine Workers. Kovach continued working as a prospector, ending up with West Canadian Collieries. He left the mining business in 1947 to found a trucking company, raise live stock on his ranch and sell insurance.

== Political career ==
Kovach first ran for a seat in the Alberta Legislature in the 1948 general election, as the Social Credit candidate in the electoral district of Pincher Creek-Crowsnest. He won on the third vote count to hold the seat for his party.

In the 1952 general election, he defeated Liberal candidate Thomas Costigan in a landslide.

In the 1955 general election, Kovach defeated two other candidates, including H. Ferguson, who was nominated jointly by the Liberals and Progressive Conservatives.

In the 1959 general election, Kovach defeated two other candidates in a landslide.

In the 1963 general election, Kovach lost a significant portion of his share of the vote in the last election, but held on to the district with a clear majority over three other candidates.

Kovach died on August 4, 1966, from a heart seizure while on a fishing trip at Lost Creek.
