= Albert Robertson =

Canadian politician (1864–1952)

Albert John Robertson
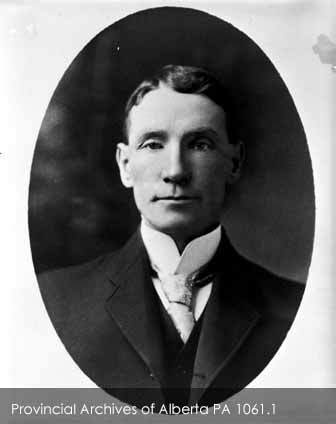

Leader of the Official Opposition in Alberta
- In office March 15, 1906 – February 25, 1909
- Preceded by: position established
- Succeeded by: R. B. Bennett

Member of the Legislative Assembly of Alberta
- In office November 9, 1905 – March 22, 1909
- Preceded by: New district
- Succeeded by: Louis Roberts
- Constituency: High River

Personal details
- Born: September 17, 1864 Markam, Canada West
- Died: January 3, 1952 (aged 87) Three Hills, Alberta
- Party: Conservative
- Occupation: Farmer, businessman, later lawyer

Albert John Robertson (September 17, 1864 – January 3, 1952) was a Canadian politician from Alberta and the first Leader of the Opposition in the province's history. He led the Conservatives in the Legislative Assembly of Alberta from 1905 to 1909, before being defeated in the 1909 election.

== Political career ==
Though he had lived in Nanton, Alberta for several years, he was still regarded as a newcomer when he was selected as the Conservative candidate in the district of High River for the 1905 Alberta provincial election. He had what the Calgary Herald described as "extensive farming operations near Nanton" and was the general manager of Nanton Grain & Lumber.

Robertson won a close race against Liberal candidate Richard Alfred Wallace; final results took more than a month to come in, and until they did the candidates traded the unofficial lead. He was one of only two Conservatives elected to the Legislative Assembly of Alberta, along with Cornelius Hiebert. As Conservative leader R. B. Bennett was defeated in the election, Robertson led the two person opposition against Alexander Cameron Rutherford's Liberal government, which controlled the rest of the 25-seat assembly.

As opposition leader, Robertson was vocal in his criticisms of Rutherford and his government. He objected to the Liberal-imposed terms under which Alberta had entered Confederation, which included a requirement that Alberta's provincial government provide public funding to Roman Catholic separate schools and control over Alberta's natural resources being left with the federal government. He called for public ownership of the telephone system and railways at a time when the government's policy was to leave both under the control of the private sector. He also demanded that the government reveal its position on a permanent capital for the province—Edmonton had been fixed as interim capital, with the choice of final capital to take place after the first provincial election, and the government was trying to avoid taking a position that might offend many Albertans' regional sensibilities. When the legislature established new electoral boundaries, Robertson objected to provisions giving Edmonton and Calgary two seats each, and argued that the maximum time between elections—five years—was too long.

Robertson was handicapped in his efforts by several factors. First, the Liberal majority was such that it was difficult for a two-member opposition to make itself heard, and more difficult still to have any tangible effect. Second, much of the government's legislation was of an uncontroversial variety, establishing the government institutions necessary for any new province. Third, Hiebert had little interest in partisan politics, and sided increasingly with the government; he eventually left the Conservative Party and unsuccessfully sought re-election as an independent. Despite Robertson's best efforts, the Conservatives declined to make his leadership permanent, opting instead to go into the 1909 election effectively leaderless.

Robertson himself sought re-election in the new district of Nanton, where he was defeated by Liberal John M. Glendenning.

== After leaving office ==
For a time, Robertson was a partner in the Hanna Realty Company—Robertson, Trenaman and Stirling in Hanna, but it dissolved in 1913 when, more than fifty years old, he went to study the law. He completed his studies in 1917, and was admitted to the bar the next year, after which he practiced law in Three Hills.

In the 1913 provincial election, Robertson ran again, in the district of Hand Hills. He was once again defeated, this time by Liberal candidate Robert Eaton.

== Electoral record ==
1905 Alberta general election: High River
Party	Candidate	Votes	%	±%
Conservative	Albert J. Robertson	578	43.95%	–
Liberal	Richard Alfred Wallace	555	42.21%	–
Independent	Wilford B. Thorne	182	13.84%	–
Total		1,315	–	–
Rejected, spoiled and declined		N/A	–	–
Eligible electors / turnout		N/A	N/A	–
Conservative pickup new district.				
Source(s) Source: "High River Official Results 1905 Alberta general election". Alberta Heritage Community Foundation.

1909 Alberta general election: Nanton
Party	Candidate	Votes	%	±%
Liberal	John M. Glendenning	439	54.88%	–
Conservative	Albert J. Robertson	361	45.13%	–
Total		800	–	–
Rejected, spoiled and declined		N/A	–	–
Eligible electors / turnout		1,042	N/A	–
Liberal pickup new district.				
Source(s) Source: "Nanton Official Results 1909 Alberta general election". Alberta Heritage Community Foundation.

1913 Alberta general election: Hand Hills
Party	Candidate	Votes	%	±%
Liberal	Robert Eaton	962	53.36%	–
Conservative	Albert J. Robertson	841	46.64%	–
Total		1,803	–	–
Rejected, spoiled and declined		N/A	–	–
Eligible electors / turnout		2,936	N/A	–
Liberal pickup new district.				
Source(s) Source: "Hand Hills Official Results 1913 Alberta general election". Alberta Heritage Community Foundation.
