= Nigel Pengelly =

Canadian politician (1925–2010)

Member of the Legislative Assembly of Alberta
- In office 1979–1989
- Preceded by: Clifford Doan
- Succeeded by: Gary Severtson
- Constituency: Innisfail

Personal details
- Born: May 29, 1925 Red Deer, Alberta
- Died: July 3, 2010 (aged 85) Ponoka, Alberta
- Party: Progressive Conservative

Nigel Ian Pengelly (May 29, 1925 – July 3, 2010) was a provincial level politician from Alberta, Canada. He served as a member of the Legislative Assembly of Alberta from 1979 to 1989. He sat in the back benches of the governing Progressive Conservative caucus.

== Political career ==
Pengelly ran for a seat to the Alberta Legislative Assembly in the 1979 Alberta general election. He won the Innisfail electoral district by a wide margin defeating three other candidates to hold it for the governing Progressive Conservative caucus. He would be re-elected to a second term with his largest plurality in the 1982 Alberta general election. The general election of 1986 Alberta general election would see Pengelly re-elected to his third and final term. His popular vote dropped significantly but he still won with a landslide margin. Pengelly would not run for another term and retired from provincial politics at the dissolution of the Assembly in 1989.

The Pengelly family originates in Cornwall, United Kingdom, the name meaning "head of the grove" in the Cornish language.
