= Garth Turcott =

Canadian politician (1930–2018)

Garth A. Turcott

Member of the Legislative Assembly of Alberta
- In office October 6, 1966 – May 23, 1967
- Preceded by: William Kovach
- Succeeded by: Charles Drain
- Constituency: Pincher Creek-Crowsnest

Personal details
- Born: July 30, 1930 Hudson Bay Junction, Saskatchewan, Canada
- Died: January 11, 2018 (aged 87) High River, Alberta, Canada
- Party: Alberta NDP
- Occupation: lawyer, politician

Garth-Alphonse Turcott (July 30, 1930 – January 11, 2018) was a lawyer and a former provincial politician from Alberta, Canada. He served as a member of the Legislative Assembly of Alberta from 1966 to 1967 sitting as the first member of the New Democratic Party to be elected in Alberta and the only member of its caucus at that time.

== Early life ==
Turcott went to the University of Saskatchewan and graduated in 1956.

== Political career ==
Turcott ran for a seat to the Alberta legislature in a by-election held on October 6, 1966, in the electoral district of Pincher Creek-Crowsnest. The by-election was hotly contested by four candidates. Turcott ended up winning by just over 100 voters over Social Credit candidate J.H. Hanrahan. This was the first election won by a candidate running under the Alberta NDP banner, although members of the NDP's predecessor, the Co-operative Commonwealth Federation sat in the legislature continuously from 1942 to 1959.

During the by-election and continuing after he took his seat Turcott along with NDP Leader Neil Reimer leveled accusations of corruption against the Social Credit government, specifically that Edgar Hinman and Alfred Hooke used their offices for personal gain.

The 1967 Alberta general election was called less than a year after Turcott was elected. He ran for a second term but was defeated, placing second to Social Credit candidate Charles Drain.

== Late life ==
Turcott ran a legal practice in Pincher Creek, Alberta. He was also on the board of directors for the Pincher Creek Co-op Association. He died on January 11, 2018, at the age of 87.
