= Frederick Deryl Bradley =

Canadian politician (born 1949)

The Honourable Frederick Deryl Bradley ECA

Member of the Legislative Assembly of Alberta for Pincher Creek-Crowsnest
- In office March 26, 1975 – June 15, 1993
- Preceded by: Charles Drain
- Succeeded by: district abolished

Personal details
- Born: September 17, 1949 (age 76) Blairmore, Alberta
- Party: Progressive Conservative Association of Alberta

Frederick Deryl "Fred" Bradley ECA (born September 17, 1949) is a former politician. He served in the Legislative Assembly of Alberta from 1975 to 1993. He also served as Minister of the Environment from 1982 to 1986 under Premiers Peter Lougheed and Don Getty.

== Political career ==
Bradley ran as a Progressive Conservative candidate in the 1975 Alberta general election and defeated incumbent Social Credit MLA Charles Drain. In the 1979 general election he was re-elected with a slightly larger plurality than in 1975. He was re-elected in the 1982 general election with the largest plurality of his career. After the election Premier Peter Lougheed appointed Bradley the new Minister of Environment. He remained with this portfolio when Don Getty became Premier in 1985.

In the 1986 general election Bradley defeated New Democrat candidate Mike Cooper by 186 votes and with 51.5% of the popular vote. After the election he was appointed Chairman of the Alberta Research Council. He faced Cooper again in the 1989 general election and won by a larger margin. He retired at dissolution of the Assembly in 1993.

Bradley was appointed to the first board of directors of the Alberta Association of Former MLAs by Speaker Ken Kowalski.
