= Lewis Roberts =

Lewis Roberts may refer to:

- Lewis Roberts (snooker player) (born 1985), English snooker player
- Lewis Roberts (naturalist) (born 1950), naturalist and botanical illustrator
- Lewis Roberts, British electronic musician known by the stage name Koreless

== See also ==
- Louis Roberts, Canadian politician
- Lewis Roberts-Thomson (born 1983), Australian football player
