= Fred W. Archer =

Canadian politician (1859–1936)

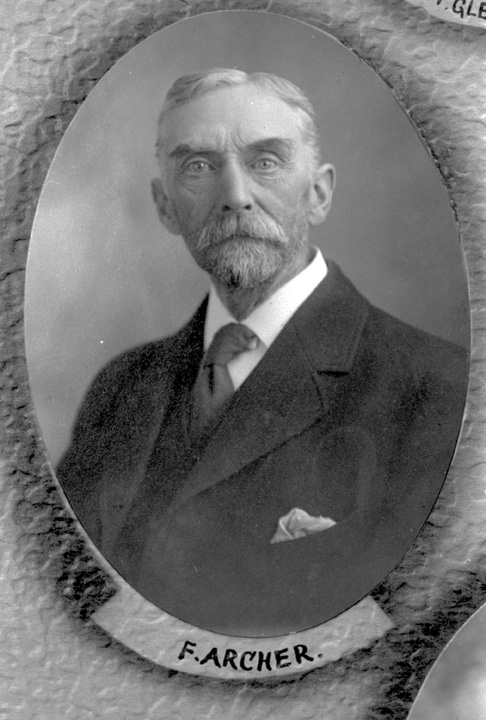

Member of the Legislative Assembly of Alberta
- In office 1913–1917
- Preceded by: John A. Simpson
- Succeeded by: Daniel Morkeberg
- Constituency: Wetaskiwin

Personal details
- Born: August 17, 1859 County Galway, Ireland
- Died: October 19, 1936 (aged 77) Innisfail, Alberta, Canada
- Party: Conservative
- Children: three
- Occupation: farmer

Frederick William Archer (August 17, 1859 – October 19, 1936) was a provincial level politician from Alberta, Canada. He was a native of Ireland and came to Canada in 1883. He served in Boulton's Mounted Infantry in the North-West Rebellion.

Archer first ran for a seat in the Alberta Legislature in the 1913 Alberta general election. He defeated Liberal incumbent John Simpson by 10 votes to pick up the riding for the Conservatives. Archer would hold 1 full term in office as a member of the official opposition.

He would be defeated by Liberal candidate Daniel Morkberg while trying to be re-elected in the 1917 Alberta general election.
