= Workers' Party of Canada =

The Workers' Party of Canada refers to:

- The Workers' Party of Canada, the legal face of the then-banned Communist Party of Canada from 1922 until 1925
- The Workers' Party of Canada, a Trotskyist party in Canada from 1934 to 1939.
