= George Douglas Stanley =

Canadian politician (1876–1954)

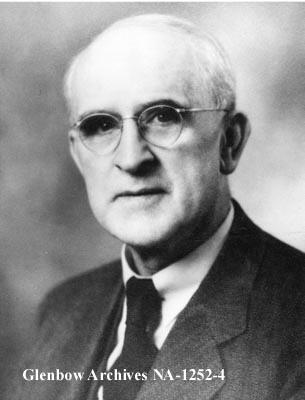
- Stanley in 1940

Member of the Legislative Assembly of Alberta
- In office March 25, 1913 – July 18, 1921
- Preceded by: Louis Roberts
- Succeeded by: Samuel Brown
- Constituency: High River

Member of the Canadian House of Commons
- In office July 28, 1930 – October 14, 1935
- Preceded by: Herbert Bealey Adshead
- Succeeded by: John Landeryou
- Constituency: Calgary East

Personal details
- Born: March 19, 1876 Exeter, Ontario, Canada
- Died: February 22, 1954 (aged 77)
- Party: Alberta Conservative federal Conservative
- Occupation: physician, politician

George Douglas Stanley (March 19, 1876 – February 22, 1954) was a Canadian politician and physician. Born in Exeter, Ontario, he began as a pioneer medical doctor in Alberta in 1901. He served in the Legislative Assembly of Alberta from 1913 to 1921 as a member of the Conservative Party, and he served in the Canadian House of Commons from 1930 to 1935 sitting with the federal Conservatives.

== Provincial politics ==
Stanley ran for a seat to the Alberta legislature in the 1909 general election. He lost by only eight votes to Liberal candidate Louis Roberts. That election result was the closest in the province that year.

Stanley ran again in the 1913 general election. Roberts decided not to defend his seat, and Stanley won by only 58 votes to pick up the seat for the Conservatives.

Stanley ran for a second term in the 1917 general election. He defeated Liberal candidate D.F. Riley by 38 votes.

Stanley retired from the Assembly at dissolution in 1921.

== Federal politics ==
In 1930, he became the Conservative candidate in the federal riding of Calgary East. Stanley defeated incumbent Herbert Adshead in the 1930 federal election. He was defeated by John Landeryou of the Social Credit Party in the 1935 federal election.
