= High River (provincial electoral district) =

Defunct provincial electoral district in Alberta, Canada

Alberta electoral district

Defunct provincial electoral district
- Legislature: Legislative Assembly of Alberta
- District created: 1905
- District abolished: 1930
- First contested: 1905
- Last contested: 1926

High River was a provincial electoral district in Alberta, Canada, mandated to return a single member to the Legislative Assembly of Alberta from 1905 to 1930.

== High River history ==
The High River electoral district was founded as one of the original 25 electoral districts contested in the 1905 Alberta general election upon Alberta becoming a province in September 1905. The electoral district was a continuation of the High River electoral district that was used to elect a single member to the Legislative Assembly of the North-West Territories from 1894 to 1905.

Richard Alfred Wallace held the High River seat in the North-West Territories Legislature from 1898 to 1905, but running a Liberal, was defeated in the 1905 election by Albert Robertson. Robertson, a Conservative won a close race against the Liberal. Final results took more than a month to come in, and until they did, the candidates traded the unofficial lead.

In the 1926 provincial election, the district used instant-runoff voting to elect its MLA.

High River electoral district was abolished prior to the 1930 Alberta general election when the Okotoks-High River electoral district was formed.

=== Members of the Legislative Assembly (MLAs) ===
Members of the Legislative Assembly for High River
Assembly	Years	Member	Party
1st	1905–1909	Albert Robertson	Conservative
2nd	1909–1913	Louis Melville Roberts	Liberal
3rd	1913–1917	George Douglas Stanley	Conservative
4th	1917–1921	George Douglas Stanley	Conservative
5th	1921–1926	Samuel Brown	United Farmers
6th	1926–1930	Samuel Brown	United Farmers
See Okotoks-High River electoral district from 1930-1971

== Election results ==
=== 1900s ===
1905 Alberta general election
Party	Candidate	Votes	%	±%
Conservative	Albert J. Robertson	578	43.95%	–
Liberal	Richard Alfred Wallace	555	42.21%	–
Independent	Wilford B. Thorne	182	13.84%	–
Total		1,315	–	–
Rejected, spoiled and declined		N/A	–	–
Eligible electors / turnout		N/A	N/A	–
Conservative pickup new district.				
Source(s) Source: "High River Official Results 1905 Alberta general election". Alberta Heritage Community Foundation.

1909 Alberta general election
Party	Candidate	Votes	%	±%
Liberal	Louis Melville Roberts	604	50.33%	8.13%
Conservative	George Douglas Stanley	596	49.67%	5.71%
Total		1,200	–	–
Rejected, spoiled and declined		N/A	–	–
Eligible electors / turnout		N/A	N/A	–
Liberal gain from Conservative		Swing		-0.54%
Source(s) Source: "High River Official Results 1909 Alberta general election". Alberta Heritage Community Foundation.

=== 1910s ===
1913 Alberta general election
Party	Candidate	Votes	%	±%
Conservative	George Douglas Stanley	616	52.47%	2.80%
Liberal	R. L. McMillan	558	47.53%	-2.80%
Total		1,174	–	–
Rejected, spoiled and declined		N/A	–	–
Eligible electors / turnout		1,475	79.59%	–
Conservative gain from Liberal		Swing		2.14%
Source(s) Source: "High River Official Results 1913 Alberta general election". Alberta Heritage Community Foundation.

1917 Alberta general election
Party	Candidate	Votes	%	±%
Conservative	George Douglas Stanley	923	51.05%	-1.42%
Liberal	Daniel Edward Riley	885	48.95%	1.42%
Total		1,808	–	–
Rejected, spoiled and declined		N/A	–	–
Eligible electors / turnout		N/A	N/A	–
Conservative hold		Swing		-1.42%
Source(s) Source: "High River Official Results 1917 Alberta general election". Alberta Heritage Community Foundation.

=== 1920s ===
1921 Alberta general election
Party	Candidate	Votes	%	±%
United Farmers	Samuel Brown	1,014	53.91%	–
Liberal	John V. Drumheller	867	46.09%	-2.86%
Total		1,881	–	–
Rejected, spoiled and declined		N/A	–	–
Eligible electors / turnout		2,488	75.60%	–
United Farmers gain from Conservative		Swing		2.86%
Source(s) Source: "High River Official Results 1921 Alberta general election". Alberta Heritage Community Foundation.

1926 Alberta general election
Party	Candidate	Votes	%	±%
United Farmers	Samuel Brown	1,137	58.34%	+4.43%
Conservative	William Levi Carlyle	541	27.76%	–
Liberal	M. R. Morrison	271	13.90%	-32.19%
Total		1,949	–	–
Rejected, spoiled and declined		93	–	–
Eligible electors / turnout		2,853	71.57%	–
United Farmers hold		Swing		7.45%
Source(s) Source: "High River Official Results 1926 Alberta general election". Alberta Heritage Community Foundation.

== See also ==
- List of Alberta provincial electoral districts
- Canadian provincial electoral districts
- High River, a town in Alberta
