= Louis Roberts =

American-Canadian politician

Louis Melville Roberts

Member of the Legislative Assembly of Alberta
- In office March 22, 1909 – April 16, 1913
- Preceded by: Albert Robertson
- Succeeded by: George Douglas Stanley
- Constituency: High River

Personal details
- Born: December 15, 1879 Cedar County, Iowa
- Died: February 11, 1958 (aged 78) Stettler, Alberta
- Party: Liberal
- Education: University of Iowa

Louis Melville Roberts (December 15, 1879 – February 11, 1958) was an American-Canadian politician from Alberta.

== Early life ==
Louis Melville Roberts was born December 15, 1879, to Scottish parents in Cedar County, Iowa. He attended the University of Iowa completing a Bachelor of Laws. He married Helen Atkinson on July 12, 1906, and had two children together.

Roberts constructed "Roberts Block", a three-storey brick warehouse on 11th Avenue in Calgary in 1909, which remains standing to this day.

== Political life ==
Roberts was elected to the Legislative Assembly of Alberta in the 1909 Alberta general election, for the Alberta Liberal Party. During his campaign, he was accused of winning the High River nomination under suspect circumstances. He would win a hotly contested election knocking off future High River Conservative MLA George Douglas Stanley by 8 votes.

Roberts served only one term in the Assembly.

Legislative Assembly of Alberta
Preceded by Albert Robertson	MLA High River; 1909–1913	Succeeded by George Douglas Stanley
