= Elnora, Alberta =

Elnora
- Village
- Village of Elnora
- Location of Elnora in Alberta
- Coordinates: 51.99264°N 113.19958°W
- Country: Canada
- Province: Alberta
- Region: Central Alberta
- Census division: 8
- Municipal district: Red Deer County
- Incorporated
  - Village: July 22, 1929

Government
  - Mayor: Leah Nelson
  - Governing body: Elnora Village Council

Area (2021)
  - Land: 1.5 km^{2} (0.58 sq mi)
- Elevation: 935 m (3,068 ft)

Population (2021)
  - Total: 288
  - Density: 191.4/km^{2} (496/sq mi)
- Time zone: UTC−06:00 (Alberta Time)
- Postal code: T0M 0Y0
- Area code: 403
- Highways: Highway 21
- Website: Official website

Elnora /ɛlˈnɔːrə/ is a village in central Alberta, Canada that is north of Three Hills. It was first organized as a village on January 2, 1908 as "Stewartville" but was renamed to Elnora (for Elinor & Nora, the wives of the postmasters) when the opening of a post office the next year required a unique name.

== Demographics ==
In the 2021 Census of Population conducted by Statistics Canada, the Village of Elnora had a population of 288 living in 147 of its 156 total private dwellings, a change of −3.4% from its 2016 population of 298. With a land area of 1.5 km^{2} (0.58 sq mi), it had a population density of 192.0/km^{2} (497.3/sq mi) in 2021.

In the 2016 Census of Population conducted by Statistics Canada, the Village of Elnora recorded a population of 298 living in 144 of its 160 total private dwellings, a −4.8% change from its 2011 population of 313. With a land area of 1.47 km^{2} (0.57 sq mi), it had a population density of 202.7/km^{2} (525.0/sq mi) in 2016.

== See also ==
- List of communities in Alberta
- List of villages in Alberta
