= 10th Alberta Legislature =

Canadian Legislative Assembly

- Majority parliament
- Feb. 22, 1945 – Jul. 16, 1948

Parliament leaders
- Premier: Ernest Charles Manning; May. 31, 1943 – Dec. 12, 1968
- Cabinet: Manning cabinet
- Leader of the Opposition: John Percy Page; Feb. 22, 1945 – Aug. 17, 1948

Party caucuses
- Government: Social Credit Party
- Opposition: Independent Citizen's Association
- Crossbench: Canadian Armed Forces
- Cooperative Commonwealth

Legislative Assembly
- Speaker of the Assembly: Peter Dawson; Feb. 25, 1937 – Mar. 24, 1963
- Members: 60 MLA seats

Sovereign
- Monarch: George VI; Dec. 11, 1936 – Feb. 6, 1952
- Lieutenant Governor: Hon. John Campbell Bowen; Mar. 23, 1937 – Feb. 1, 1950

Sessions
- 1st session February 22, 1945 – April 6, 1945
- 2nd session July 24, 1945 – July 26, 1945
- 3rd session February 14, 1946 – March 27, 1946
- 4th session February 20, 1947 – March 31, 1947
- 5th session February 19, 1948 – March 31, 1948
← 9th	→ 11th

The 10th Alberta Legislative Assembly was in session from February 22, 1945, to July 16, 1948, with the membership of the assembly determined by the results of the 1944 Alberta general election held on August 8, 1944. The Legislature officially resumed on February 22, 1945, and continued until the fifth session was prorogued on March 31, 1948 and dissolved on July 16, 1948, prior to the 1948 Alberta general election.

Alberta's tenth government was controlled by the majority Social Credit Party for the third time, led by Premier Ernest Manning who would go on to be the longest serving Premier in Alberta history. The Official Opposition was led by John Percy Page a member of the Independent Citizen's Association. The Speaker was Peter Dawson who would serve until his death during the 15th legislature on March 24, 1963.

Premier Ernest Manning called a snap election in 1944 to gain a new mandate. He won a big majority, wiping out most of the Independents. Three members of Canadian Armed Forces entered the Legislature in a delayed vote held in 1945, filling seats especially reserved for overseas military personnel.

== Membership in the 10th Alberta Legislature ==
District	Member	Party	First elected/ previously elected	No.# of term(s)
Acadia-Coronation	Clarence Gerhart	Social Credit	1940	2nd term
Alexandra	Selmer Berg	Social Credit	1935	3rd term
Athabasca	Gordon Lee	Social Credit	1940	2nd term
Banff-Cochrane	Arthur Wray	Social Credit	1944	1st term
Banff-Cochrane	Arthur Wray	Independent Social Credit	1944	1st term
Beaver River	Lucien Maynard	Social Credit	1935	3rd term
Bow Valley-Empress	Wilson Cain	Social Credit	1935	3rd term
Bruce	James L. McPherson	Social Credit	1935	3rd term
Calgary	Fred Anderson	Social Credit	1935	3rd term
Calgary	Andrew Davison	Independent	1940	2nd term
Calgary	Howard MacDonald	Independent	1944	1st term
Calgary	Rose Wilkinson	Social Credit	1944	1st term
Calgary	Aylmer Liesemer	CCF	1944	1st term
Camrose	Chester Sayers	Social Credit	1941	2nd term
Cardston	Nathan Eldon Tanner	Social Credit	1935	3rd term
Clover Bar	Floyd Baker	Social Credit	1935	3rd term
Cypress	Edith Thurston	Social Credit	1944	1st term
Didsbury	Howard Hammell	Social Credit	1944	1st term
Drumheller	Gordon Taylor	Social Credit	1940	2nd term
Edmonton	Ernest Manning	Social Credit	1935	3rd term
Edmonton	John P. Page	Independent	1940	2nd term
Edmonton	Elmer Roper	CCF	1942	2nd term
Edmonton	Norman James	Social Credit	1935	3rd term
Edmonton	William J. Williams	Veteran's & Active Force	1944	1st term
Edson	Norman Willmore	Social Credit	1944	1st term
Gleichen	George E. Bell	Social Credit	1944	1st term
Grande Prairie	Ira McLaughlin	Social Credit	1944	1st term
Grouard	William Fallow	Social Credit	1935	3rd term
Hand Hills	Wallace Cross	Social Credit	1935	3rd term
Lac Ste. Anne	Albert Bourcier	Social Credit	1935	3rd term
Lacombe	Duncan MacMillan	Social Credit	1935	3rd term
Leduc	Ronald Ansley	Social Credit	1935	3rd term
Lethbridge	John Landeryou	Social Credit	1944	1st term
Little Bow	Peter Dawson	Social Credit	1935	3rd term
Macleod	James Hartley	Social Credit	1935	3rd term
Medicine Hat	John Lyle Robinson	Social Credit	1935	3rd term
Okotoks-High River	Ivan Casey	Social Credit	1944	1st term
Olds	Norman E. Cook	Social Credit	1940	2nd term
Peace River	William Gilliland	Social Credit	1944	1st term
Pembina	Robin Jorgenson	Social Credit	1944	1st term
Pincher Creek-Crowsnest	Ernest Duke	Social Credit	1935	3rd term
Ponoka	Ora B. Moore	Social Credit	1944	1st term
Red Deer	David A. Ure	Social Credit	1943	2nd term
Redwater	James Popil	Social Credit	1935	3rd term
Rocky Mountain House	Alfred Hooke	Social Credit	1935	3rd term
Sedgewick	Albert Fee	Social Credit	1935	3rd term
Spirit River	Henry DeBolt	Social Credit	1940	2nd term
St. Albert	Charles Holder	Social Credit	1935, 1944	2nd term*
St. Paul	Joseph Beaudry	Social Credit	1935	3rd term
Stettler	William Mackie	Social Credit	1944	1st term
Stony Plain	Cornelia Wood	Social Credit	1940	2nd term
Taber	Roy S. Lee	Social Credit	1940	2nd term
Vegreville	Michael Ponich	Social Credit	1944	1st term
Vermilion	William R. Cornish	Social Credit	1944	1st term
Wainwright	William Masson	Social Credit	1935	3rd term
Warner	Solon Low	Social Credit	1935, 1940	3rd term*
Warner	Leonard Halmrast (1945)	Social Credit	1945	1st term
Wetaskiwin	John Wingblade	Social Credit	1935	3rd term
Willingdon	William Tomyn	Social Credit	1935	3rd term
Active Service Voters
Province at Large/Armed Forces	James Harper Prowse	Independent	1945	1st term
Province at Large/Armed Forces	James Harper Prowse	Liberal	1945	1st term
Province at Large/Royal Canadian Air Force	Frederick C. Colborne	Independent	1945	1st term
Province at Large/Royal Canadian Navy	Loftus Dudley Ward	Independent	1945	1st term

== Standings changes in the 10th Assembly ==
Number of members per party by date	1944	1945			1947	
Number of members per party by date	Jul 8	Feb 5	?	Aug 6	Feb ?	Apr 10
Social Credit	51		50	51	50	
Independent	3					
Canadian Forces	0	3				2
Co-operative Commonwealth	2					
Veteran's & Active Force	1					
Independent Social Credit	0				1	
Liberal	0					1
Total members	57	60	59	60		
Vacant	0		1	0		
Government Majority	45	42	41	42	40	

Membership changes in the 10th Assembly
Date	Member Name	District	Party	Reason
1945	Solon Earl Low	Warner	Social Credit	Resigned to run in the 1945 Canadian federal election
August 6, 1945	Leonard Halmrast	Warner	Social Credit	Elected in a by-election
February 1947	Arthur Wray	Banff-Cochrane	Independent Social Credit	Forced to sit as an Independent after a motion was passed by the Assembly
April 10, 1947	James Prowse	Province at Large/Armed Forces	Liberal	Joined the Liberal Caucus
