= 11th Alberta Legislature =

Canadian Legislative Assembly

- Majority parliament
- Feb. 17, 1949 – Jul. 3, 1952

Parliament leaders
- Premier: Ernest Charles Manning; May 31, 1943 – December 12, 1968
- Cabinet: Manning cabinet
- Leader of the Opposition: James Harper Prowse; February 21, 1952 – April 15, 1958

Party caucuses
- Government: Social Credit Party
- Opposition: Cooperative Commonwealth
- Crossbench: Alberta Liberal Party

Legislative Assembly
- Speaker of the Assembly: Peter Dawson; February 25, 1937 – March 24, 1963
- Members: 57 MLA seats

Sovereign
- Monarch: George VI; December 11, 1936 – February 6, 1952
- Elizabeth II; February 6, 1952 – September 8, 2022
- Lieutenant governor: Hon. John Campbell Bowen; March 23, 1937 – February 1, 1950
- Hon. John James Bowlen; February 1, 1950 – December 16, 1959

Sessions
- 1st session February 17, 1949 – March 29, 1949
- 2nd session July 4, 1949 – July 7, 1949
- 3rd session February 23, 1950 – April 5, 1950
- 4th session February 22, 1951 – April 7, 1951
- 5th session February 21, 1952 – April 10, 1952
← 10th	→ 12th

The 11th Alberta Legislative Assembly was in session from February 17, 1949, to July 3, 1952, with the membership of the assembly determined by the results of the 1948 Alberta general election held on August 17, 1948. The Legislature officially resumed on February 17, 1949, and continued until the fifth session was prorogued on April 10, 1952 and dissolved on July 3, 1952, prior to the 1952 Alberta general election.

Alberta's eleventh government was controlled by the majority Social Credit Party for the fourth time, led by Premier Ernest Manning who would go on to be the longest serving Premier in Alberta history. The Official Opposition was led by James Harper Prowse a member of the Alberta Liberal Party. The Speaker was Peter Dawson who would serve until his death during the 15th legislature on March 24, 1963.

The opposition was divided between the Liberal and Co-operative Commonwealth and 2 Independents.

== Membership in the 11th Alberta Legislature ==
District	Member	Party	First elected/ previously elected	No.# of term(s)
Acadia-Coronation	Clarence Gerhart	Social Credit	1940	3rd term
Alexandra	Anders Aalborg	Social Credit	1948	1st term
Athabasca	Gordon Lee	Social Credit	1940	3rd term
Banff-Cochrane	Arthur Wray	Independent Social Credit	1944	2nd term
Beaver River	Harry Lobay	Social Credit	1948	1st term
Bow Valley-Empress	Wilson Cain	Social Credit	1935	4th term
Bruce	Earl Hardy	Social Credit	1948	1st term
Calgary	Rose Wilkinson	Social Credit	1944	2nd term
Calgary	Frederick C. Colborne	Social Credit	1945	2nd term
Calgary	Howard MacDonald	Independent	1944	2nd term
Calgary	Hugh John MacDonald	Liberal	1948	1st term
Calgary	Aylmer Liesemer	Co-operative Commonwealth	1944	2nd term
Camrose	Chester Sayers	Social Credit	1941	3rd term
Cardston	Nathan Eldon Tanner	Social Credit	1935	4th term
Clover Bar	Floyd Baker	Social Credit	1935	4th term
Cypress	James Underdahl	Social Credit	1948	1st term
Didsbury	Howard Hammell	Social Credit	1944	2nd term
Drumheller	Gordon Taylor	Social Credit	1940	3rd term
Edmonton	Elmer Roper	Co-operative Commonwealth	1942	3rd term
Edmonton	Lou Heard	Social Credit	1948	1st term
Edmonton	Ernest Manning	Social Credit	1935	4th term
Edmonton	James Harper Prowse	Liberal	1945	2nd term
Edmonton	Clayton Adams	Social Credit	1948	1st term
Edson	Norman Willmore	Social Credit	1944	2nd term
Gleichen	George Bell	Social Credit	1944	2nd term
Grande Prairie	Ira McLaughlin	Social Credit	1944	2nd term
Grouard	John Wood	Social Credit	1948	1st term
Grouard	Joseph Desfosses (1951)	Liberal	1951	1st term
Hand Hills	Wallace Cross	Social Credit	1935	4th term
Lac Ste. Anne	Albert Bourcier	Social Credit	1935	4th term
Lac Ste. Anne	Albert Bourcier	Independent	1935	4th term
Lacombe	Duncan MacMillan	Social Credit	1935	4th term
Leduc	Ronald Ansley	Social Credit	1935	4th term
Leduc	Ronald Ansley	Independent Social Credit	1935	4th term
Lethbridge	John Landeryou	Social Credit	1944	2nd term
Little Bow	Peter Dawson	Social Credit	1935	4th term
Macleod	James Hartley	Social Credit	1935	4th term
Medicine Hat	John Lyle Robinson	Social Credit	1935	4th term
Okotoks-High River	Ivan Casey	Social Credit	1944	2nd term
Olds	Norman E. Cook	Social Credit	1940	3rd term
Olds	Frederick Niddrie (1950)	Social Credit	1950	1st term
Peace River	William Gilliland	Social Credit	1944	2nd term
Pembina	Robin Jorgenson	Social Credit	1944	2nd term
Pincher Creek-Crowsnest	William Kovach	Social Credit	1948	1st term
Ponoka	Ora Moore	Social Credit	1944	2nd term
Red Deer	David A. Ure	Social Credit	1943	3rd term
Redwater	Peter Chaba	Social Credit	1948	1st term
Rocky Mountain House	Alfred Hooke	Social Credit	1935	4th term
Sedgewick	Albert Fee	Social Credit	1935	4th term
Spirit River	Henry DeBolt	Social Credit	1935	4th term
St. Albert	Lucien Maynard	Social Credit	1935	4th term
St. Paul	Joseph Beaudry	Social Credit	1935	4th term
Stettler	William Mackie	Social Credit	1944	2nd term
Stony Plain	Cornelia Wood	Social Credit	1940	3rd term
Taber	Roy S. Lee	Social Credit	1940	3rd term
Vegreville	Michael Ponich	Social Credit	1944	2nd term
Vermilion	William Cornish	Social Credit	1944	2nd term
Wainwright	William Masson	Social Credit	1935	4th term
Warner	Leonard Halmrast	Social Credit	1945	2nd term
Wetaskiwin	John Wingblade	Social Credit	1935	4th term
Willingdon	William Tomyn	Social Credit	1935	4th term

== Composition at election ==
Affiliation	Members
Social Credit	51
Liberal	2
Co-operative Commonwealth	2
Independent	1
Independent Social Credit	1
Total	57

== Standings changes ==
Membership changes in the 11th Assembly
Date	Name	District	Party	Reason
November 26, 1948	Albert Bourcier	Lac Ste. Anne	Independent	Excluded from the Social Credit caucus by a resolution at the 1948 Social Credit AGM.
June 16, 1952	Ronald Ansley	Leduc	Independent Social Credit	Expelled from caucus for attend Alberta Boucier's nomination convention.
