= 12th Alberta Legislature =

Canadian Legislative Assembly

- Majority parliament
- February 19, 1953 – May 12, 1955

Parliament leaders
- Premier: Ernest Charles Manning; May 31, 1943 – December 12, 1968
- Cabinet: Manning cabinet
- Leader of the Opposition: James Harper Prowse; February 21, 1952 – April 15, 1958

Party caucuses
- Government: Social Credit Party
- Opposition: Alberta Liberal Party
- Crossbench: Cooperative Commonwealth
- Progressive Conservative Association of Alberta

Legislative Assembly
- Speaker of the Assembly: Peter Dawson; February 25, 1937 – March 24, 1963
- Members: 60 MLA seats

Sovereign
- Monarch: Elizabeth II; February 6, 1952 – September 8, 2022
- Lieutenant Governor: Hon. John James Bowlen; February 1, 1950 – December 16, 1959

Sessions
- 1st session February 19, 1953 – April 2, 1953
- 2nd session February 18, 1954 – April 8, 1954
- 3rd session February 17, 1955 – May 12, 1955
| ← 11th | → 13th |

The 12th Alberta Legislative Assembly was in session from February 19, 1953, to May 12, 1955, with the membership of the assembly determined by the results of the 1952 Alberta general election held on August 5, 1952. The Legislature officially resumed on February 19, 1953, and continued until the third session was prorogued and dissolved on May 12, 1955, prior to the 1955 Alberta general election.

Alberta's twelfth government was controlled by the majority Social Credit Party for the fifth time, led by Premier Ernest Manning who would go on to be the longest serving Premier in Alberta history. The Official Opposition was led by James Harper Prowse a member of the Alberta Liberal Party. The Speaker was Peter Dawson who would serve until his death during the 15th legislature on March 24, 1963.

== Membership in the 12th Alberta Legislature ==
| District | Member | Party | First elected/ previously elected | No.# of term(s) |
|---|---|---|---|---|
| Acadia-Coronation | Clarence Gerhart | Social Credit | 1940 | 4th term |
| Alexandra | Anders Aalborg | Social Credit | 1948 | 2nd term |
| Athabasca | Antonio Aloisio | Social Credit | 1952 | 1st term |
| Banff-Cochrane | Lee Leavitt | Social Credit | 1952 | 1st term |
| Bonnyville | Laudas Joly | Social Credit | 1921, (Note: St. Paul (First elected as a United Farmer)) 1952 | 3rd term* |
| Bow Valley-Empress | Wilson Cain | Social Credit | 1935 | 5th term |
| Bruce | Earl Hardy | Social Credit | 1948 | 2nd term |
| Calgary | Paul Brecken | Progressive Conservative | 1952 | 1st term |
| Calgary | Rose Wilkinson | Social Credit | 1944 | 3rd term |
| Calgary | Frederick C. Colborne | Social Credit | 1945 | 3rd term |
| Calgary | Howard MacDonald | Social Credit | 1944 | 3rd term |
| Calgary | Arthur Dixon | Social Credit | 1952 | 1st term |
| Calgary | Hugh John MacDonald | Liberal | 1948 | 2nd term |
| Camrose | Chester Sayers | Social Credit | 1941 | 4th term |
| Cardston | Edgar Hinman | Social Credit | 1952 | 1st term |
| Clover Bar | Floyd Baker | Social Credit | 1935 | 5th term |
| Cypress | James Underdahl | Social Credit | 1948 | 2nd term |
| Didsbury | Howard Hammell | Social Credit | 1944 | 3rd term |
| Drumheller | Gordon Taylor | Social Credit | 1940 | 4th term |
| Edmonton | Ernest Manning | Social Credit | 1935 | 5th term |
| Edmonton | James Harper Prowse | Liberal | 1945 | 3rd term |
| Edmonton | Elmer Roper | Co-operative Commonwealth | 1942 | 4th term |
| Edmonton | Joseph Donovan Ross | Social Credit | 1952 | 1st term |
| Edmonton | Edgar Gerhart | Social Credit | 1952 | 1st term |
| Edmonton | John Page | Conservative | 1940, 1952 | 3rd term* |
| Edmonton | Harold Tanner | Liberal | 1952 | 1st term |
| Edson | Norman Willmore | Social Credit | 1944 | 3rd term |
| Gleichen | George E. Bell | Social Credit | 1944 | 3rd term |
| Grand Prairie | Ira McLaughlin | Social Credit | 1944 | 3rd term |
| Grouard | Joseph Desfosses | Liberal | 1951 | 2nd term |
| Hand Hills | Wallace Warren Cross | Social Credit | 1935 | 5th term |
| Lac La Biche | Harry Lobay | Social Credit | 1948 | 2nd term |
| Lac Ste. Anne | Angelo Montemurro | Social Credit | 1952 | 1st term |
| Lacombe | Allen Patrick | Social Credit | 1952 | 1st term |
| Leduc | Ronald Ansley | Independent Social Credit | 1935 | 5th term |
| Lethbridge | John Landeryou | Social Credit | 1944 | 3rd term |
| Little Bow | Peter Dawson | Social Credit | 1935 | 5th term |
| Macleod | James Hartley | Social Credit | 1935 | 5th term |
| Medicine Hat | John Lyle Robinson | Social Credit | 1935 | 5th term |
| Medicine Hat | Elizabeth G. Robinson (1953) | Social Credit | 1953 | 1st term |
| Okotoks-High River | Ivan Casey | Social Credit | 1944 | 3rd term |
| Olds | Frederick Niddrie | Social Credit | 1950 | 2nd term |
| Peace River | William Gilliland | Social Credit | 1944 | 3rd term |
| Pembina | Robin Jorgenson | Social Credit | 1944 | 3rd term |
| Pincher Creek-Crowsnest | William Kovach | Social Credit | 1948 | 2nd term |
| Ponoka | Glen Johnston | Social Credit | 1952 | 1st term |
| Red Deer | David A. Ure | Social Credit | 1943 | 4th term |
| Red Deer | Cam Kirby (1954) | Progressive Conservative | 1954 | 1st term |
| Redwater | Peter Chaba | Social Credit | 1948 | 2nd term |
| Rocky Mountain House | Alfred Hooke | Social Credit | 1935 | 5th term |
| Sedgewick | Jack Hillman | Social Credit | 1952 | 1st term |
| Spirit River | Adolph Fimrite | Social Credit | 1952 | 1st term |
| St. Albert | Lucien Maynard | Social Credit | 1935 | 5th term |
| St. Paul | Raymond Reierson | Social Credit | 1952 | 1st term |
| Stettler | John Clark | Social Credit | 1952 | 1st term |
| Stony Plain | Cornelia Wood | Social Credit | 1940 | 4th term |
| Taber | Roy S. Lee | Social Credit | 1940 | 4th term |
| Vegreville | Michael Ponich | Social Credit | 1944 | 3rd term |
| Vermilion | William Cornish | Social Credit | 1944 | 3rd term |
| Wainwright | William Masson | Social Credit | 1935 | 5th term |
| Warner | Leonard Halmrast | Social Credit | 1945 | 3rd term |
| Wetaskiwin | John Wingblade | Social Credit | 1935 | 5th term |
| Willingdon | Nick Dushenski | Co-operative Commonwealth | 1952 | 1st term |

== Composition at election ==
| Affiliation | Members |
|---|---|
| Social Credit | 53 |
| Liberal | 3 |
| Co-operative Commonwealth | 1 |
| Progressive Conservative | 1 |
| Conservative | 1 |
| Independent Social Credit | 1 |
| Total | 60 |
