= 9th Alberta Legislature =

Canadian Legislative Assembly

- Majority parliament
- Feb. 20, 1941 – Jul. 7, 1944

Parliament leaders
- Premier: William Aberhart; September 3, 1935 – May 23, 1943
- Ernest Charles Manning; May 31, 1943 – December 12, 1968
- Cabinets: Aberhart cabinet Manning cabinet
- Leader of the Opposition: James H. Walker; February 22 – April 8, 1941
- Alfred Speakman; January 29 – March 19, 1942
- James Mahaffy; February 18 – March 30, 1943
- James H. Walker; February 10 – March 24, 1944

Party caucuses
- Government: Social Credit Party
- Opposition: Independent Citizen's Association
- Crossbench: Liberal Party
- Labour Party

Legislative Assembly
- Speaker of the Assembly: Peter Dawson; February 25, 1937 – March 24, 1963
- Members: 57 MLA seats

Sovereign
- Monarch: George VI; December 11, 1936 – February 6, 1952
- Lieutenant Governor: Hon. John Campbell Bowen; March 23, 1937 – February 1, 1950

Sessions
- 1st session February 20 – April 8, 1941
- 2nd session January 29 – March 19, 1942
- 3rd session February 18 – March 30, 1943
- 4th session February 10 – March 24, 1944
← 8th	→ 10th

The 9th Alberta Legislature was in session from February 20, 1941, to July 7, 1944, with the membership of the Legislative Assembly determined by the results of the 1940 Alberta general election held on March 21, 1940. The Legislature officially resumed on February 20, 1941, and continued until the fourth session was prorogued on March 24, 1944, and dissolved on July 7, prior to the 1944 Alberta general election.

Alberta's government was controlled by the majority Social Credit Party for the second time, led by Premier William Aberhart until his death on May 23, 1943; he was succeeded by Ernest Manning, who went on to be the longest-serving premier in Alberta history. Manning abandoned the monetary policies of Aberhart during his term for more traditional conservatism. The Official Opposition was led by James H. Walker, a member of the Independent Citizen's Association, from February 22 to April 8, 1941, and again from February 10 to March 24, 1944. In between, the Opposition Leader was Alfred Speakman from January 29 to March 19, 1942, and James Mahaffy from February 18 to March 30, 1943. The Speaker was Peter Dawson, who served until his death during the 15th legislature on March 24, 1963.

The Independent Citizen's Association, started by the Conservatives and including most Liberals and some former United Farmer supporters, won 19 seats. The remaining Liberal Party that did not endorse the independent movement won one seat, and a labour candidate won one seat. Two independents later re-joined the Liberal Party, and the Co-operative Commonwealth entered the Legislature in its first by-election.

== Bills ==
During the second session the government introduced An Act to prohibit the Sale of Lands to any Enemy Aliens and Hutterites for the Duration of the War (Bill 60), which prohibited the purchase or registration of lands by an enemy alien or Hutterite. It was the intention to prevent these people from buying land or from becoming registered as the owners of land at least until after the Second World War ended. The government later introduced An Act to amend The Land Sales Prohibition Act (Bill 48) in the third session, which amended The Land Sales Prohibition Act for the purpose of extending this prohibition to leases and agreements for leases. The federal government under Prime Minister William Lyon Mackenzie King's Cabinet disallowed the legislation on the recommendation of the Federal Minister of Justice Louis St. Laurent. This was the last use of the federal disallowance authority (not to be confused with reservation authority, which was last used in Saskatchewan in 1961). The King government's rationale for the disallowance was that the federal government had regulated all matters related to enemy aliens and the statute conflicted with federal policy.

== Party standings after 9th General Elections ==
Affiliation	Members
Social Credit	36
Independent	19
Liberal	1
Labor	1
Total	57

District	Member	Party	First elected/ previously elected	No.# of term(s)
Acadia-Coronation	Clarence Gerhart	Social Credit	1940	1st term
Alexandra	Selmer Berg	Social Credit	1935	2nd term
Athabasca	Gordon Lee	Social Credit	1940	1st term
Banff-Cochrane	Frank Laut	Independent	1940	1st term
Beaver River	Lucien Maynard	Social Credit	1935	2nd term
Bow Valley-Empress	Wilson Cain	Social Credit	1935	2nd term
Bruce	James L. McPherson	Social Credit	1935	2nd term
Calgary	James Mahaffy	Independent	1940	1st term
Calgary	Fred Anderson	Social Credit	1935	2nd term
Calgary	Andrew Davison	Independent	1940	1st term
Calgary	William Aberhart	Social Credit	1935	2nd term
Calgary	John J. Bowlen	Independent	1930	3rd term
Camrose	David B. Mullen	Social Credit	1935	2nd term
Camrose	Chester Sayers (1941)	Social Credit	1941	1st term
Cardston	Nathan Eldon Tanner	Social Credit	1935	2nd term
Clover Bar	Floyd Baker	Social Credit	1935	2nd term
Cypress	Fay Jackson	Independent	1940	1st term
Didsbury	Ernest M. Brown	Independent	1940	1st term
Drumheller	Gordon Taylor	Social Credit	1940	1st term
Edmonton	Ernest Manning	Social Credit	1935	2nd term
Edmonton	John P. Page	Independent	1940	1st term
Edmonton	Norman James	Social Credit	1935	2nd term
Edmonton	David Milwyn Duggan	Independent	1926	4th term
Edmonton	Hugh John Macdonald	Independent	1940	1st term
Edmonton	Elmer Roper (1942)	CCF	1942	1st term
Edson	Angus James Morrison	Labour	1940	1st term
Gleichen	Donald McKinnon	Independent	1940	1st term
Grande Prairie	Lewis O'Brien	Independent	1940	1st term
Grouard	Joseph Tremblay	Liberal	1936	2nd term
Hand Hills	Wallace Cross	Social Credit	1935	2nd term
Lac Ste. Anne	Albert Bourcier	Social Credit	1935	2nd term
Lacombe	Duncan MacMillan	Social Credit	1935	2nd term
Leduc	Ronald Ansley	Social Credit	1935	2nd term
Lethbridge	Peter M. Campbell	Independent	1937	2nd term
Little Bow	Peter Dawson	Social Credit	1935	2nd term
Macleod	James Hartley	Social Credit	1935	2nd term
Medicine Hat	John Lyle Robinson	Social Credit	1935	2nd term
Okotoks-High River	John Broomfield	Independent	1940	1st term
Olds	Norman E. Cook	Social Credit	1940	1st term
Peace River	Eld J. Martin	Independent	1940	1st term
Pembina	George MacLachlan	Independent	1921, (Note: First elected as a United Farmer) 1940	4th term*
Pincher Creek-Crowsnest	Ernest Duke	Social Credit	1935	2nd term
Ponoka	Percy McKelvey	Independent	1940	1st term
Red Deer	Alfred Speakman	Independent	1940	1st term
Red Deer	David A. Ure (1943)	Social Credit	1943	1st term
Redwater	James Popil	Social Credit	1935	2nd term
Rocky Mountain House	Alfred Hooke	Social Credit	1935	2nd term
Sedgewick	Albert Fee	Social Credit	1935	2nd term
Spirit River	Henry DeBolt	Social Credit	1940	1st term
St. Albert	Lionel Tellier	Independent	1940	1st term
St. Paul	Joseph Beaudry	Social Credit	1935	2nd term
Stettler	Chester Reynolds	Social Credit	1940	1st term
Stony Plain	Cornelia Wood	Social Credit	1940	1st term
Taber	Roy S. Lee	Social Credit	1940	1st term
Vegreville	George Woytkiw	Social Credit	1940	1st term
Vegreville	Solon Low (1940)	Social Credit	1935, (Note: Warner) 1940	2nd term*
Vermilion	William Fallow	Social Credit	1935	2nd term
Wainwright	William Masson	Social Credit	1935	2nd term
Warner	James H. Walker	Independent	1940	1st term
Wetaskiwin	John Wingblade	Social Credit	1935	2nd term
Willingdon	William Tomyn	Social Credit	1935	2nd term
