= John Hugill =

Attorney General of Alberta, 1935–1937

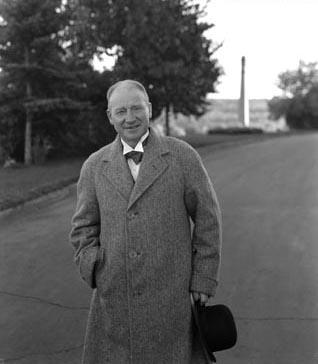

Attorney General of Alberta
- In office September 3, 1935 – August 6, 1937
- Preceded by: John Lymburn
- Succeeded by: William Aberhart

Member of the Legislative Assembly of Alberta
- In office August 22, 1935 – March 21, 1940 Serving with Fred Anderson; John J. Bowlen; Edith Gostick; John Irwin; Ernest Manning
- Preceded by: John J. Bowlen; Hugh Farthing; Norman Hindsley; John Irwin; William Henry Ross; Fred J. White
- Succeeded by: William Aberhart; Fred Anderson; John J. Bowlen; Andrew Davison; James Mahaffy
- Constituency: Calgary

Personal details
- Born: John William Hugill; October 3, 1881 West Hartlepool, England
- Died: January 13, 1971 (aged 89) Vancouver, British Columbia, Canada
- Party: Social Credit; Independent
- Spouse: Eelen Cameron Templeton
- Children: John, Eelen, and Jean
- Education: University of King's College; University of Manitoba
- Profession: Lawyer

John William Hugill (October 3, 1881 – January 13, 1971) was a Canadian lawyer and politician who served as Attorney General of Alberta from 1935 until 1937. Born in England, he came to Canada and studied law before setting up a practice in Calgary. He became a prominent resident of that city, and served two years on its city council. In the early 1930s, he was one of the few prominent Calgarians with mainstream respectability to support William Aberhart's Social Credit League. He was elected as a candidate for it in the 1935 provincial election and, when it formed government, was named Attorney General by Aberhart.

Hugill's time as Member of the Legislative Assembly (MLA) was dominated by differences of opinion with Aberhart. Hugill did not believe that social credit could be legally implemented by a provincial government and did not support Aberhart's attempts to do so. When asked by Lieutenant Governor John Campbell Bowen whether he considered three of the government's acts to be constitutional, he replied honestly that he did not; this prompted Aberhart to demand his resignation as Attorney General. Thereafter Hugill was an outspoken opponent of the Aberhart government, though he did not seek re-election in the 1940 election. He retired from the practice of law in 1949, and died in 1971.

== Early life ==
John Hugill was born in West Hartlepool, County Durham, October 3, 1881. He studied at the City of London School before immigrating to Canada in 1896. Settling in Nova Scotia, he attended King's Collegiate School to complete his matriculation, after which he attended King's College, from which he earned a Bachelor of Civil Law and later a Doctor of Civil Law. Beginning in 1898, he worked for Furness-Withy & Company, Limited, a steamship operator, in Canada and England. From 1904 until 1907 he was a political agent in London, after which he returned to Canada to read law in the Calgary office of future Prime Minister of Canada R. B. Bennett. He was called to the bars of Alberta and Saskatchewan in 1910, and subsequently earned a Bachelor of Laws from the University of Manitoba. (Note: Hugill's City of Calgary biography reports that he earned this last degree from "the University of Alberta and the University of Manitoba", but this is not corroborated by other sources. Nor is the claim by David Elliott and Iris Miller, in their biography of William Aberhart, that Hugill studied at Dalhousie Law School.) On July 10, 1913, he married Eelen Cameron Templeton, with whom he had three children.

After being called to the bar, Hugill worked for several years as a lawyer for the Canadian Pacific Railway. In 1920, he opened his own practice in Calgary, and was made King's Counsel in July 1921. Hugill was active in Calgary society, and specifically with the Anglican Church of Canada, the Masons, the Calgary Board of Trade, the Ranchmen's Club, the Calgary Polo Club, the Calgary Golf & Country Club, and the Calgary branch of Canadian Authors. He was also a major in the Calgary Highlanders. Outside of Calgary, he was a member of the Edmonton Club and London's British Empire Club. His hobbies included golf, polo, and big game hunting. He also held a lifetime membership in the Alpine Club, which he was awarded for reaching the summit of Mount Stephen. Hugill was consul to Sweden and vice consul to the Netherlands for fifteen years.

== Political career ==
Hugill served as Calgary alderman from 1921 until 1923. During this term, he was twice acting Mayor of Calgary. One of these occasions included a visit to Calgary by Julian Byng, 1st Viscount Byng of Vimy, the Governor General.

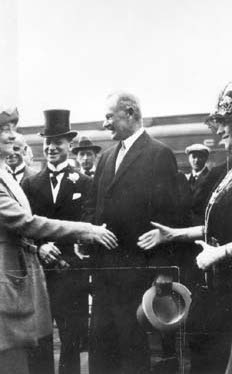
Hugill (in top hat) as acting mayor of Calgary during the visit of Julian Byng, 1st Viscount Byng of Vimy and Lady Byng to that city, 1922

In the early 1930s, Hugill was one of the few members of Calgary's social and business elite to support William Aberhart's burgeoning Social Credit League. He was not an adherent of its social credit monetary theories, but joined Social Credit because he viewed it as a vehicle of reform. Concerned about the constitutionality of a provincial government legislating on banking and monetary issues, as was advocated by many Social Crediters, Hugill sought (and, by his account, received) assurances from Aberhart that no such legislation would be forthcoming from a Social Credit government. Athabasca University historian Alvin Finkel suggests that Hugill's initial support of Social Credit was opportunistic, and not born of any belief in its rightness.

If Hugill's allegiance to Social Credit was incongruous, his allegiance to Aberhart was even more so. Aberhart, a radio evangelist, did not share Hugill's taste for fine wines, cigars, or flippant humour. Hugill, for his part, objected to Aberhart's belief in the occult, and in particular to his practice of numerology. (Note: Aberhart named a seven-member cabinet because he considered seven to be the "perfect" number, numerologically speaking.) About his eventual presence in cabinet, McGill University's J. R. Mallory said "one can imagine the discomfort of an experienced barrister...moderate in his political views and absorbed principally in his departmental duties, confronted by a cabinet of hot gospellers, presided over by the Messianic Mr. Aberhart."

=== Election as MLA ===
Whatever the surface incompatibilities between Hugill and the Social Credit movement, in the runup to the 1935 provincial election Aberhart found his team lacking mainstream respectability and legal expertise. Hugill provided both, and Aberhart recruited him to run as a Social Credit candidate in Calgary. During the campaign, Hugill attracted attention by refusing (on Aberhart's instructions, and like other Social Credit candidates) to accept questions from the floor at political meetings. The Calgary Albertan commented that "it must be rather irritating for a gentleman like J. W. Hugill, a practitioner at the bar and a King's Counsel withal, skilled and experienced in the art of debate, not to be free to make use of it".

On August 22, Hugill was elected one of Calgary's six Members of the Legislative Assembly (MLAs). On the initial ballot count he was in fifth place of twenty candidates, but after the redistribution of votes in accordance with the single transferable vote system in use in Calgary at the time, he fell to sixth place, and was not elected until the eighteenth and final count. Aberhart named him Attorney General several days later, and he was sworn in with the rest of Aberhart's cabinet on September 3, 1935.

=== Attorney General ===
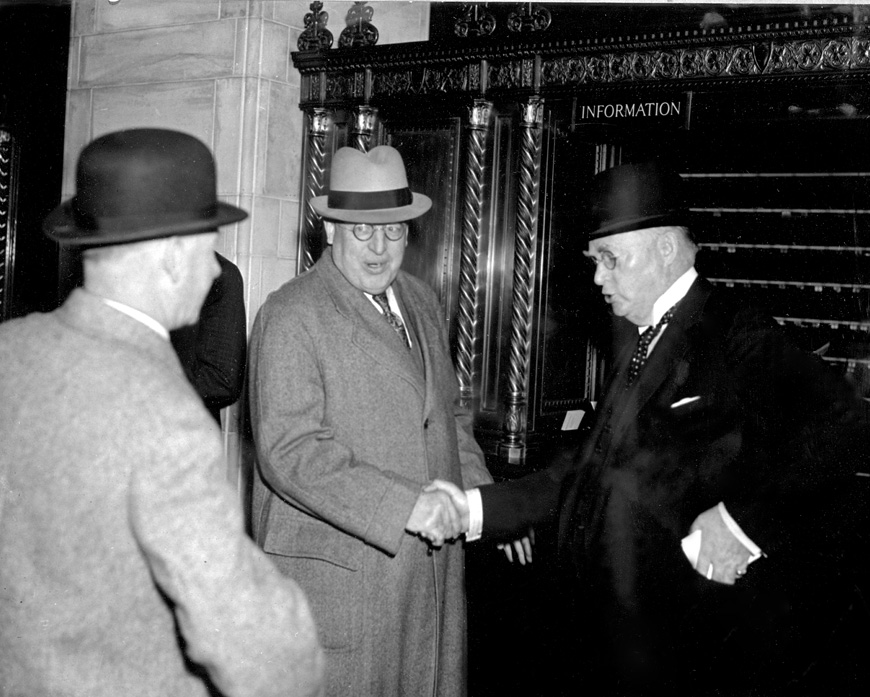
Hugill (in the foreground) looks on as William Aberhart (centre) and Prime Minister R.B. Bennett shake hands.

Hugill's service as Attorney General was brief and eventful. Three days after their swearing-in, he and Aberhart embarked for Ottawa to meet with Bennett, now prime minister, and seek a federal loan to prevent Alberta from defaulting on its bond and payroll obligations. Despite needing Can$18 million, they secured only $2.25 million from Bennett. They then set out for Detroit to meet with Henry Ford—who had financed many of his projects without involving banks, Social Credit's sworn enemies—but, on their arrival, discovered that he was away at his summer home. Returning home still in need of funding, Aberhart authorized Hugill to negotiate for the services of Robert J. Magor, a Montreal financier who had successfully assisted the government of Newfoundland in emerging from dire financial straits. Magor's acceptance of a $600 per month appointment raised the ire of Social Crediters loyal to C. H. Douglas, the originator of social credit, and of Douglas himself, who saw Magor as a tool of eastern financial interests and Hugill as their man inside the government.

Magor's financial advice led to the government tabling a very conservative 1936 budget that was decidedly not in keeping with social credit ideals. Partly in response to the situation, British social crediter John Hargrave visited Alberta to advise the government on how it might implement social credit. At a cabinet meeting with Hargrave present, Hugill expressed that the Canadian Constitution did not give to the provinces sufficient powers to implement social credit, and that doing so would necessitate the use of the federal power over banking and currency. Hargrave, referring to Social Credit's election promises to implement social credit, responded, "surely the public ought to be told". After the meeting, Hargrave—by his account, at Aberhart's request—prepared an eleven-point plan to implement social credit in Alberta; Aberhart rejected it, but the Social Credit caucus invited Hargrave to explain it. The resulting meeting featured the following exchange between Hugill and Hargrave:

Hugill: You realise, Mr. Hargrave, that this scheme you are putting forward would not be legal?

Hargrave: I am not interested in legal arguments.
Hugill: What would you do if your legislation was disallowed and your parliament dissolved?

Hargrave: There is only one way in which such a government could be "dissolved", and that is by sending in troops to throw it out, physically, neck and crop, down the steps of this parliament house. Does the Attorney-General suggest that any authority anywhere in Ottawa or elsewhere would, in those circumstances, march troops into Alberta?

Much of the caucus, frustrated by the government's failure to implement social credit or even take tangible steps towards doing so, sided with Hargrave, and Hugill's cabinet colleagues did not come to his defense. Hargrave's presentation to Social Credit MLAs precipitated the 1937 Social Credit backbenchers' revolt, in which much of the Social Credit caucus threatened to bring down the government over its failure to introduce social credit. The revolt was muted with the creation of the Social Credit Board, which was to oversee the introduction of social credit.

The first legislation recommended by the Social Credit Board included the Credit of Alberta Regulation Act, which provided for provincial licensing and supervision of banks, the Bank Employees Civil Rights Act, which prohibited unlicensed banks and their employees from instigating legal proceedings, and the Judicature Act, which prohibited challenges to the constitutionality of Alberta legislation. Hugill did not believe that the acts were within the province's legislative competence, but avoided saying so publicly. In response to a question posed in the legislature on the province's authority over banking, he said that he could not conclusively answer such an academic question, but referred the questioner to the British North America Act, 1867. In a caucus meeting, in response to a request from Aberhart that he "[assure] us that he feels in a position on every count to recommend that the Lieutenant-Governor gives his assent to every Social Credit Measure", Hugill was more open in his beliefs.

On August 6, 1937, after the three acts were approved by the legislature, John Campbell Bowen, Lieutenant Governor of Alberta requested a meeting with Aberhart and Hugill before he granted royal assent to the legislation. He asked Hugill whether he considered the bills constitutional, and Hugill replied in the negative. Aberhart immediately said that he would take personal responsibility for the legislation's constitutionality, and Bowen granted assent. (Note: All three acts were later disallowed by the federal government.) In journalist John Barr's telling, as Aberhart and Hugill left the meeting the premier said "your resignation is accepted, Hugill", while according to Elliott and Miller he said only "you know what this means, don't you?" Whatever the words used, Hugill resigned later that afternoon.

Historians have debated the propriety of Hugill's actions in undercutting his own government's legislation to Bowen. Elliott and Miller believe that he could have refused to answer Bowen's question, but that by not doing so he "obeyed the letter of the Alberta law that set out his duties". They see his cabinet duties conflicting with his responsibility as a legal adviser, and argue that by giving Bowen his honest opinion he was upholding the oath he took as a barrister. Mallory disagrees, citing a rule dating from 1882 that the Lieutenant Governor should use—or consider using—his powers of reservation only as a Dominion officer, and never on the advice of his ministers, including the Attorney General. He speculates that neither Bowen nor Hugill was aware of this rule, and criticizes the federal government for not monitoring the situation and advising Bowen as to the proper use of his powers.

=== Post-resignation ===
Having left the government, Hugill also left the Social Credit caucus, and served the rest of his term as MLA as an independent. He joined the People's League, a collection of mainstream elements opposed to Aberhart which ran nominally independent candidates in the 1940 and 1944 elections, and denounced Aberhart's government as a "tyrannical dictatorship" and the premier as the most sadistic man he had ever met. Hugill himself did not seek re-election in the 1940 election.

One of Hugill's last acts as Attorney General had been attending a Toronto meeting of the Canadian Bar Association. In response to Hugill's comments about his government, Aberhart refused reimbursement of Hugill's expenses from that trip. Later, when Aberhart received word that Ryerson Press was going to publish an exposé of his government authored by Hugill, he threatened to cancel Ryerson's contracts to print Alberta's school textbooks unless the company reconsidered. The exposé was not published.

== Later life ==
At the expiration of his term as MLA in 1940, Hugill returned to practicing law in Edmonton and Calgary. During the Second World War, he served on the mobilization board. He retired to Victoria in 1949, the year after the death of his wife, and died in Vancouver on January 13, 1971.

== Works cited ==
- Barr, John J. (1974). The Dynasty: The Rise and Fall of Social Credit in Alberta. Toronto: McClelland and Stewart Limited. ISBN 0-7710-1015-X.
- Blue, John (1924). Alberta, past and present : historical and biographical (PDF). Vol. 2. Chicago, Illinois: Pioneer Historical.
- Elliott, David R.; Miller, Iris (1987). Bible Bill: A Biography of William Aberhart. Edmonton: Reidmore Books. ISBN 0-919091-44-X.
- Finkel, Alvin (1989). The Social Credit Phenomenon in Alberta. Toronto: University of Toronto Press. ISBN 0-8020-6731-X.
- Irving, John A. (1959). The Social Credit Movement in Alberta. Toronto: University of Toronto Press.
- Mallory, J. R. (1954). Social Credit and the Federal Power in Canada. Toronto: University of Toronto Press. ISBN 0-8020-6301-2.
