= Grant MacEwan =

Canadian politician

The Honourable Grant MacEwan OC AOE
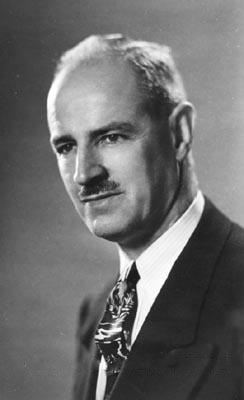

9th Lieutenant Governor of Alberta
- In office January 26, 1966 – July 2, 1974
- Monarch: Elizabeth II
- Governors General: Georges Vanier; Roland Michener; Jules Léger
- Premier: Ernest Manning; Harry Strom; Peter Lougheed
- Preceded by: John Percy Page
- Succeeded by: Ralph Steinhauer

Leader of the Opposition
- In office February 5, 1959 – April 17, 1959
- Preceded by: James Harper Prowse
- Succeeded by: 5-year vacancy (then Michael Maccagno)

Member of the Legislative Assembly of Alberta
- In office June 29, 1955 – June 18, 1959 Serving with Arthur Ryan Smith, Hugh John MacDonald, Frederick C. Colborne, Rose Wilkinson, Arthur J. Dixon
- Preceded by: Howard MacDonald; Paul Brecken
- Succeeded by: District Abolished
- Constituency: Calgary

28th Mayor of Calgary
- In office July 4, 1963 – October 18, 1965
- Preceded by: Harry Hays
- Succeeded by: John "Jack" Clifford Leslie

Personal details
- Born: John Walter Grant MacEwan; August 12, 1902 Brandon, Manitoba, Canada
- Died: June 15, 2000 (aged 97) Calgary, Alberta, Canada
- Party: Liberal
- Children: 2
- Education: Ontario Agricultural College; University of Toronto; Iowa State University; University of Saskatchewan; University of Manitoba
- Occupation: Farmer, agriculturalist, academic, author, and historian
- Profession: Politician

John Walter Grant MacEwan OC AOE (August 12, 1902 – June 15, 2000) was a Canadian farmer, professor at the University of Saskatchewan, Dean of Agriculture at the University of Manitoba, the 28th Mayor of Calgary and both a Member of the Legislative Assembly (MLA) and the ninth Lieutenant Governor of Alberta, Canada. MacEwan University in Edmonton, Alberta, and the MacEwan Student Centre at the University of Calgary as well as the neighbourhoods of MacEwan Glen in Calgary and MacEwan in Edmonton are named after him.

== Roots ==
MacEwan's grandparents were Highland Scottish. George MacEwen (Grant MacEwan changed his name to "MacEwan" with an "a" sometime in the 1920s), his paternal grandfather, came from Stirling, Scotland, to farm in Guelph, Ontario, and married Annie Cowan, another Scot. These two had a son, Alexander MacEwen. After leaving home, Alexander went to Brandon, Manitoba to begin a farm of his own, and was introduced to Bertha Grant (his neighbour James Grant's sister) and soon got married. Bertha and Alexander were MacEwan's parents. Bertha was a devout Presbyterian. This strong Scottish, Presbyterian, and agriculture-driven heritage was influential in MacEwan's life.

== Early life (1902–1921) ==
MacEwan was born in Brandon, Manitoba, and lived there until the age of thirteen. Because of problems with his father's fire-extinguisher business, the family moved to Melfort, Saskatchewan, to begin a life of farming. As a boy, MacEwan was entrepreneurial, entering into many different businesses, especially cattle. Most of his first big investments were in cows, either for entering into shows or for producing calves and milk. MacEwan also delivered newspapers and sold vegetables and various other items. At the age of twelve, he began working at a grocery store. He went to school and spent most of his time helping out on the family farm.

== Student years (1921–1928) ==
In 1921, at the age of nineteen, MacEwan went to Guelph, Ontario to attend the Ontario Agricultural College (then, an associate agricultural college of the University of Toronto). He attended the OAC for five years before going back to Melfort. MacEwan was often placed among the top of his class. He lived in College, and took part in a multitude of campus activities, including the football and basketball teams. In his first two years he completed a preliminary agricultural education. This then allowed him to attend the school for another three years to get a full degree.

During his time at school his brother George fell ill with spinal meningitis and died on March 27, 1924. This event was hard on both MacEwan and his parents. His family was very tightly knit, and George had been very close to his parents.

On May 28, 1926, MacEwan graduated from the OAC along with 33 other boys with a BSc degree. After receiving the degree he returned home.

In 1927, he received an invitation to study at the Iowa State College of Agriculture, now Iowa State University. He once again left home to complete a one-year program. In 1928, he received an MSc degree from the university.

== Academic years (1928–1951) ==
MacEwan held a position first as a professor, then Head of Animal Husbandry at the University of Saskatchewan from 1928 to 1946. It was here that he developed as an agriculturalist. He researched and published manuscripts on many farming and ranching techniques. During this period, MacEwan traveled away from the university to many farms across Saskatchewan to lecture, judge animals and give meat-cutting lessons.

In 1932, MacEwan took a trip to Great Britain with a load of cattle, to observe ranching practices in the British Isles. He visited Scotland and recorded in his journal that, "it is but little wonder that such a unique country has produced the best horses, the best cattle, and the best men in the world." (see Foran, Max reference) He also visited Wales, England and Jersey. He returned to Canada via the Hudson Bay ship route north along the coasts of Iceland and Greenland, then entering Hudson Bay and landing at Churchill, Manitoba. He was the first person to go through customs at the new port in Churchill.

MacEwan married Phyllis Cline, a school teacher from Saskatchewan, in 1935. Two stories from his wedding cast light on what kind of a person MacEwan was. First, whereas traditionally the bride and groom remain out of public view until the ceremony calls for them to enter, Grant stood at the front entrance to greet guests as they arrived. Second, when it came time for the new couple to leave, MacEwan could not be found until someone looked out at the parking lot, where Grant was fixing a flat tire. Grant and Phyllis had a daughter, Heather MacEwan, in 1939.

In 1946 MacEwan moved to the University of Manitoba to be the Dean of Agriculture. He served in this position until 1951. In 1948, he published his first historical book, The Sodbusters. It was the first of thirty-seven historical documents he wrote. His style was characterized by plain speech, to convey ideas easily to the reader – specifically students.

== Politician years (1951–1965) ==
MacEwan spent his entire career affiliated with the Liberals. On June 25, 1951, he took his first run at electoral politics by running for a seat in the House of Commons of Canada in the electoral district of Brandon. He was defeated by Progressive Conservative Walter Dinsdale by a wide margin finishing second in the two candidate race. The riding voted for Dinsdale despite being a Liberal stronghold. MacEwan had been parachuted in the district while he was still living in Winnipeg, Manitoba. Dinsdale on the other hand was local to Brandon and came from a prominent family in the district, thus appealing to the voters more than MacEwan.

He won a seat in the Legislative Assembly of Alberta in 1955, and from November 1958 MacEwan led the Alberta Liberal Party through a provincial election. His party won only one seat in the 1959 election, with MacEwan suffering personal defeat in a new single-member Calgary district, Calgary-North. Alberta had switched to first past the post after the 1955 election, moving from its long-standing use of multi-winner single transferable vote in Calgary. Under the new system the Social Credit government received more than 90 percent of the seats in the legislature, far more than its share of the vote.

He remained the leader of the party until 1960. During the 1959 election, his reputation was his main asset in the campaign against his Social Credit Party opponent, but the strong anti-Liberal sentiment in the new district foiled his run for re-election.

During the 1950s, MacEwan became a vegetarian out of respect for the lives of animals.

MacEwan also served as Calgary alderman from 1953 to 1963 and then as mayor from 1963 to 1965. Calgary at the time was using single transferable voting and instant run-off voting, and MacEwan had more success under that system than under the FPTP system used in provincial elections.

== Lieutenant-Governor of Alberta (1966–1974) ==
I believe that the God of Nature must be without prejudice, with exactly the same concern for all of His children, and that the human invokes no more, no less of fatherly love than the beaver or the sparrow.

— Excerpt from The MacEwan Creed, 1969

MacEwan served as Lieutenant-Governor of Alberta from 1966 to 1974. During this time, he was a staunch environmentalist, and voiced environmental concerns in a number of his publications, primarily in the 1966 book Entrusted to My Care. However, MacEwan primarily advocated for wildlife conservation rather than focusing on the negative ecological impacts of oil sands development. To MacEwan, the greater concern with Alberta's oil industry at the time was that it provided a non-sustainable source of income for the province, which was at risk of disappearing.

== Later life ==
MacEwan produced almost all of his historical books after his 'retirement'. His books, mostly biographical, were based on history but often left out references, a bibliography, or even analysis of historical events. That made critics continually attack his unprofessional approach to history. The only response that he gave was that in 1984, "I don't know what the scholars will think of it. Nor do I care. I'm not writing for them, I'm writing for Canadians" (Lee Shedden reference). He also taught numerous courses at the University of Calgary and Olds College. He became an Officer of the Order of Canada in 1974.

MacEwan continued to be physically active and was not known to waste any time. He believed that anyone awake should be doing something. In his eighties, he still rode horses, hiked and walked, outpaced reporters on morning jogs, built a log cabin, and chopped logs with an axe.

In 1990, his wife died, and afterwards, he began to slow down but remained very active in comparison to other 90-year-olds. He continued to give speeches, and published two more books in the 1990s. Another book was released two months after his death. On May 6, 2000, MacEwan received Golden Pen Lifetime Achievement Award for lifetime literary achievements by the Writers' Guild of Alberta that has been given to only one other person, W.O. Mitchell. He died a month later in Calgary, aged 97, and was given a state funeral, the first one in Alberta since 1963 (for Peter Dawson), at Robertson-Wesley United Church in Edmonton.

== Legacy ==
MacEwan is often seen as an iconic historic figurehead in Alberta, and many places, institutions, and organizations have been named after him.

=== 'Grant MacEwan' used as place or building name ===
- Elementary School in Calgary
- MacEwan Student Centre at University of Calgary
- MacEwan University in Edmonton
- Grant MacEwan Literary Awards
- Grant MacEwan Peak in Bow Valley Wildland Provincial Park
- Grant MacEwan Boulevard in Leduc
- Grant MacEwan Bridge in Fort McMurray
- Community of "MacEwan" and MacEwan Glen in Calgary
- Neighbourhood of "MacEwan" in Edmonton MacEwan, Edmonton

=== 'Grant MacEwan' used as organization name ===
- Grant MacEwan College
- Grant MacEwan Mountain Club

== Published works ==
- —; Ewan, A.H. (1936). The Science and Practice of Canadian Animal Husbandry (1945 ed.). Toronto: Thomas Nelson & Sons.
- —; Ewan, A.H. (1939). General Agriculture. Toronto: Thomas Nelson & Sons.
- — (1941). Breeds of Farm Live-Stock in Canada. Toronto: Thomas Nelson & Sons.
- — (1945). The Feeding of Farm Animals. Toronto: Thomas Nelson & Sons.
- — (1948). The Sodbusters. Toronto: Thomas Nelson & Sons. Second edition, Calgary: Fifth House, 2000. ISBN 1894004620
- — (1950). Agriculture on Parade: The Story of the Fairs and Exhibitions of Western Canada. Toronto: Thomas Nelson & Sons.
- — (1952). Between the Red and the Rockies. Toronto: University of Toronto Press. 1979 edition, ISBN 9780802060129
- — (1957). Eye Opener Bob: The Story of Bob Edwards. Edmonton: Institute of Applied Art. Second Edition, Saskatoon: Western Producer Prairie Books, 1974. Third, annotated edition, James Martin, ed. Calgary: Brindle & Glass, 2004. ISBN 9781459330269 - Biography of Bob Edwards
- — (1958). Fifty Mighty Men (1975 ed.). Saskatoon: Western Producer Prairie Books. ISBN 0919306632. Second edition, 1985. Third edition, Vancouver: Greystone Books, 1995.
- — (1958). Calgary Cavalcade: From Fort to Fortune. Edmonton: Institute of Applied Art. edition, Saskatoon: Western Producer Prairie Books, 1975. ISBN 0919306500
- — (1960). John Ware's Cow Country (1973 ed.). Edmonton: Institute of Applied Art. ISBN 0919306438.. Second edition, Saskatoon: Western Producer Prairie Books, 1973. Third edition, Vancouver: Greystone Books, 1995. - Biography of John Ware.
- — (1962). Blazing the Old Cattle Trail (1969 ed.). Saskatoon: Western Producer Prairie Books. ISBN 091930656X. Second edition, Calgary: Fifth House, 2000.
- — (1964). Hoofprints and Hitching Posts. Saskatoon: Western Producer Prairie Books. Second edition, as Our Equine Friends: Stories of Horses in History. Calgary: Fifth House, 2002.
- — (1966). Poking Into Politics. Edmonton: Institute of Applied Art.
- — (1966). Entrusted to My Care. Saskatoon: Western Producer Prairie Books. Revised edition, 1986.
- —; Foran, Max (1968). West to the Sea. Toronto: McGraw-Hill Ryerson. Simultaneously released in paperback as A Short History of Western Canada.
- — (1969). Tatanga Mani: Walking Buffalo of the Stonies. Edmonton: Hurtig. - Biography of Tatanka Mani aka Walking Buffalo.
- — (1969). Harvest of Bread. Saskatoon: Western Producer Prairie Books.
- — (1971). Power for Prairie Plows. Saskatoon: Western Producer Prairie Books.
- — (1971). Portraits from the Plains. Toronto: McGraw-Hill Ryerson. ISBN 0070929092.
- — (1973). Sitting Bull: The Years in Canada. Edmonton: Hurtig. ISBN 0888300735. - Biography of Sitting Bull.
- — (1973). This is Calgary. photographs by Toby Rankin. Calgary: Calgary Real Estate Board Co-operative.
- — (1975). The Battle for the Bay: The Story of the Hudson Bay Railroad. Saskatoon: Western Producer Prairie Books. ISBN 0919306519.
- — (1975). ...And Mighty Women Too: Stories of Notable Western Canadian Women. Saskatoon: Western Producer Prairie Books. ISBN 9780919306653. Second edition, as Mighty Women, Vancouver: Greystone Books, 1995.
- — (1977). Memory Meadows: Horse Stories from Canada's Past. Saskatoon: Western Producer Prairie Books. ISBN 0919306705. Revised edition, 1985. Third edition, Vancouver: Greystone Books, 1997.
- — (1977). Cornerstone Colony: Selkirk's Contribution to the Canadian West. Saskatoon: Western Producer Prairie Books. ISBN 0919306802.
- — (1978). The Rhyming Horseman of the Qu'Appelle: Captain Stanley Harrison. Saskatoon: Western Producer Prairie Books.
- — (1979). Pat Burns: Cattle King. Saskatoon: Western Producer Prairie Books. ISBN 0888330103. – Biography of Pat Burns
- — (1980). Grant MacEwan's Illustrated History of Western Canadian Agriculture. Saskatoon: Western Producer Prairie Books. ISBN 0888330596.
- — (1981). Métis Makers of History. Saskatoon: Western Producer Prairie Books.
- — (1982). Alberta Landscapes. photographs by Rusty MacDonald. Saskatoon: Western Producer Prairie Books. ISBN 0888330944.
- — (1982). MacDonald, Rusty (ed.). The Best of Grant MacEwan. Saskatoon: Western Producer Prairie Books. ISBN 088833091X.
- — (1982). Highlights of Shorthorn History. Calgary: Alberta Shorthorn Association.
- — (1983). Charles Noble: Guardian of the Soil. Saskatoon: Western Producer Prairie Books. ISBN 0888330928. – Biography of Charles Noble
- — (1983). Wildhorse Jack: The Legend of Jack Morton. Saskatoon: Western Producer Prairie Books. ISBN 0888331061.
- — (1984). Marie Anne: The Frontier Adventures of Marie Anne Lagimodière. Saskatoon: Western Producer Prairie Books. ISBN 9780888331380. – Biography of Marie Anne Lagimodière
- — (1984). 100 Years of Smoke, Sweat and Tears. Calgary: Calgary Firefighters' Association. ISBN 9780889255623.
- — (1984). French in the West/Les Franco-Canadiens dans l'Ouest. Saint-Boniface: Les Editions des Plaines. ISBN 0920944450.
- — (1985). Frederick Haultain: Frontier Statesman of the Canadian West. Saskatoon: Western Producer Prairie Books. – Biography of Frederick Haultain
- — (1986). Foran, Max (ed.). Grant MacEwan's Journals. Edmonton: Lone Pine. ISBN 9780919433076.
- — (1986). Heavy Horses: Highlights of Their History. Saskatoon: Western Producer Prairie Books. Second edition, Whitewater, WI: Heart Prairie Press, 1991. Third edition, as Heavy Horses: an Illustrated History of the Draft Horse, Calgary: Fifth House, 2001.
- — (1987). He Left Them Laughing When He Said Good-bye: The Life and Times of Frontier Lawyer Paddy Nolan. Saskatoon: Western Producer Prairie Books. ISBN 0888332416. – Biography of Paddy Nolan
- — (1989). Colonel James Walker: Man of the Western Frontier. Saskatoon: Western Producer Prairie Books. ISBN 0888333048.
- — (1990). Grant MacEwan's West: Sketches from the Past. Saskatoon: Western Producer Prairie Books. ISBN 9780888333209.
- — (1991). Highlights of Sheep History in the Canadian West. Calgary: Alberta Sheep and Wool Commission.
- — (1993). Coyote Music and Other Humorous Tales of the Early West. Calgary: Rocky Mountain Books. ISBN 9780921102250.
- — (1995). Buffalo: Sacred and Sacrificed. Edmonton: Alberta Sport, Recreation, Parks and Wildlife Foundation. ISBN 0969935501.
- — (2000). Watershed: Reflections on Water. Edmonton: NeWest. ISBN 9781896300351.
- — (2002). A Century of Grant MacEwan: Selected Writings. Calgary: Brindle & Glass. ISBN 9781926972008.

Party political offices
Preceded by James Harper Prowse	Leader of the Alberta Liberal Party; 1958–1960	Succeeded by Dave Hunter
