= John J. Bowlen =

Canadian politician

The Honourable John J. Bowlen
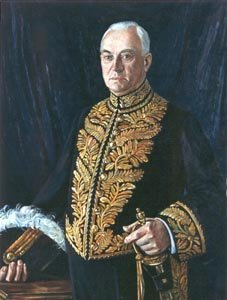

7th Lieutenant Governor of Alberta
- In office February 1, 1950 – December 16, 1959
- Monarchs: George VI; Elizabeth II
- Governors General: The Viscount Alexander of Tunis; Vincent Massey; Georges Vanier
- Premier: Ernest Manning
- Preceded by: John C. Bowen
- Succeeded by: John Percy Page

Member of the Legislative Assembly of Alberta
- In office June 19, 1930 – August 8, 1944 Serving with Hugh Farthing, John Irwin, George Harry Webster, Fred J. White, Harold McGill, Edith Gostick, Ernest Manning, Fred Anderson, John Hugill, James Mahaffy, Andrew Davison, William Aberhart
- Preceded by: Alexander McGillivray; Robert Parkyn
- Succeeded by: Howard MacDonald; Aylmer Liesemer
- Constituency: Calgary

Personal details
- Born: John James Bowlen; July 21, 1876 Cardigan, Prince Edward Island
- Died: December 16, 1959 (aged 83) Edmonton, Alberta, Canada
- Party: Liberal
- Spouse: Caroline Suive (m. 1900)
- Children: 3
- Occupation: Rancher, farmer
- Profession: politician

John James Bowlen (July 21, 1876 – December 16, 1959) was a Canadian rancher, farmer, provincial politician and the seventh Lieutenant Governor of Alberta. Upon the death of his wife, his eldest daughter, Mary Bowlen Mooney became official hostess as "Lady to His Honour the Lieutenant Governor."
