= Calgary (provincial electoral district) =

Defunct provincial electoral district in Alberta, Canada

Coordinates: 51°02′42″N 114°03′26″W

Alberta electoral district

Defunct provincial electoral district
- Legislature: Legislative Assembly of Alberta
- District created: 1905
- District abolished: 1913
- District re-created: 1921
- District re-abolished: 1959
- First contested: 1905
- Last contested: 1957

Calgary was a provincial electoral district in Alberta, Canada, mandated to return one to six members to the Legislative Assembly of Alberta from 1905 to 1913, and again from 1921 to 1959. The district largely encompassed the boundaries of the city of Calgary, and was revised accordingly as the city grew.

== Calgary history ==
=== Boundary history ===
Calgary 1909 boundaries
Bordering districts
North	East	West	South
Gleichen	Gleichen	Okotoks	Okotoks
Legal description from the Statutes of Alberta 1909, An Act respecting the Legislative Assembly of Alberta.
riding map goes here		map in relation to other districts in rural Alberta goes here	
Calgary.—All that portion of the City of Calgary as incorporated lying south of the Bow River.
Note: Boundaries came into force in 1909 and lasted until the district was abolished in 1913.

Calgary 1921 boundaries
Bordering districts
North	East	West	South
Cochrane	Gleichen	Cochrane	Okotoks
Legal description from the Statutes of Alberta 1921, An Act to Amend The Motor Vehicle Act, The Unearned Increment Tax Act, and Certain other Acts and Ordinances.
riding map goes here		map in relation to other districts in rural Alberta goes here	
2. Section 2, as amended by section 1 of chapter 37 of the Statutes of Alberta, 1917: By adding thereto the following: "except the electoral districts of East Edmonton, West Edmonton and South Edmonton which shall hereafter constitute one electoral district to be called 'Edmonton' which shall return five members, and except the electoral districts of North Calgary, South Calgary and Centre Calgary which shall hereafter constitute one electoral district to be called 'Calgary' and which shall return five members, and except the electoral district of Medicine Hat which shall hereafter return two members."
Note: The electoral district was created by amalgamation of Centre Calgary, North Calgary and South Calgary in 1921. No original boundary description was created.

Calgary 1926 boundaries
Bordering districts
North	East	West	South
Cochrane	Gleichen	Cochrane	Okotoks
Legal description from the Statutes of Alberta 1926, An Act to amend The Legislative Assembly Act.
riding map goes here		map in relation to other districts in rural Alberta goes here	
Calgary.—Commencing at the north-east corner of section 10, township 25, range 29, west of the 4th meridian; thence west along the north boundary of sections 10 and 9, township 25, range 29 west of the 4th meridian, and of sections 12, 11, 10, 9, 8 and 7, in township 25, range 1, west of the 5th meridian, and of sections 12, 11, 10, 9, 8, and 7, in township 25, range 2, west of the 5th meridian; thence south along the meridian line between ranges 2, and 3, west of the 5th meridian to its intersection with the Elbow River; thence south-easterly down stream along the Elbow River to the point of its intersection with the north boundary of section 20, township 23, range 1, west of the 5th meridian; thence east along the north boundary of sections 20, 21, 22, and 23, to the point of intersection of the north boundary of section 23, township 23, range 1, west of the 5th meridian with the Bow River; thence southerly and down stream along the Bow River to the point of its intersection with the north boundary of sections 9 and 10, township 23, range 29, west of the 4th meridian to the north-east corner of section 10, township 23, range 29 west of the 4th meridian; thence north along the east boundary of sections 15, 22, 27 and 34, township 23 range 29, west of the 4th meridian and of sections 3, 10, 15, 22, 27, and 34, in township 24, range 29, west of the 4th meridian, and of sections 3 and 10 in township 25, range 29, west of the 4th meridian to the point of commencement.
Note: The boundaries came into force in 1926.

Calgary 1930 boundaries
Bordering districts
North	East	West	South
Cochrane	Gleichen	Cochrane	Okotoks-High River
Legal description from the Statutes of Alberta 1930, An Act to amend The Legislative Assembly Act.
		map in relation to other districts in rural Alberta goes here	
Calgary.—Commencing at the north-east corner of section 10, township 25, range 29, west of the 4th meridian; thence west along the north boundary of sections 10 and 9, township 25, range 29, west of the 4th meridian, and of sections 12, 11, 10, 9, 8 and 7, in township 25, range 1, west of the 5th meridian, and of sections 12, 11, 10, 9, 8, and 7, in township 25, range 2, west of the 5th meridian; thence south along the meridian line between ranges 2, and 3, west of the 5th meridian to its intersection with the Elbow River; thence south-easterly down stream along the Elbow River to the point of its intersection with the meridian line between ranges 1 and 2, west of the 5th meridian; thence south along the said meridian line between ranges 1 and 2, west of the 5th meridian, to the north-west corner of section 7, township 23, range 1, west of the 5th meridian; thence east along the north boundary of sections 7, 8, 9, 10, 11 and 12, township 23, range 1, west of the 5th meridian, and along the north boundary of sections 9 and 10, township 23, range 29, west of the 4th meridian; thence north along the east boundary of sections 15, 22, 27, and 35, township 23, range 29, west of the 4th meridian, and of sections 3, 10, 15, 22, 27, and 34, in township 24, range 29, west of the 4th meridian, and of sections 3 and 10 in township 25, range 29, west of the 4th meridian, to the point of commencement.
Note: The boundaries came into force in 1930.

Calgary 1939 boundaries
Bordering districts
North	East	West	South
Banff-Cochrane	Gleichen	Banff-Cochrane	Okotoks-High River
Legal description from the Statutes of Alberta 1939, An Act to Amend The Legislative Assembly Act.
riding map goes here		map in relation to other districts in rural Alberta goes here	
"Electoral Division of Calgary, the boundary whereof is as follows: Commencing at the north-east corner of section 10, in township 25, range 29, west of the 4th meridian; thence west along the north boundary of sections 10 and 9, township 25, range 29, west of the 4th meridian, and of sections 12, 11, 10, 9, 8 and 7, in township 25, range 1, west of the 5th meridian, and of sections 12, 11, 10, 9, 8, and 7 in township 25, range 2, west of the 5th meridian; thence south along the meridian line between ranges 2, and 3, west of the 5th meridian to its intersection with the Elbow River; thence south-easterly downstream along the Elbow River to the point of its intersection with the meridian line between ranges 1 and 2, west of the 5th meridian, thence south along the said meridian line between ranges 1 and 2, west of the 5th meridian, to the north-west corner of section 7, township 23, range 1, west of the 5th meridian; thence east along the north boundary of sections 7, 8, 9, 10, 11 and 12, township 23, range 1, west of the 5th meridian, and along the north boundary of sections 9 and 10, township 23, range 29, west of the 4th meridian, to the north-east corner of section 10, township 23, range 29, west of the 4th meridian, and of sections 3, 10, 15, 22, 27 and 34 in township 24, range 29, west of the 4th meridian, and of sections 3 and 10, in township 25, range 29, west of the 4th meridian, to the point of commencement.
Note: The boundaries came into force in 1940.

Calgary 1950 boundaries
Bordering districts
North	East	West	South
Banff-Cochrane	Gleichen	Banff-Cochrane	Banff-Cochrane
Legal description from the Statutes of Alberta 1950, An Act to Amend The Legislative Assembly Act.
riding map goes here		map in relation to other districts in rural Alberta goes here	
"Electoral Division of Calgary, the boundary whereof is as follows: Commencing at the north-east corner of section 10, township 25, range 29, west of the 4th meridian; thence westerly along the north boundary of sections 10 and 9, township 25, range 29, west of the 4th meridian and of sections 12, 11, 10, 9, 8 and 7, in township 25, range 1, west of the 5th meridian, and of sections 12, 11, 10, 9, 8 and 7, in township 25, range 2, west of the 5th meridian; thence southerly along the meridian line lying between ranges 2 and 3, west of the 5th meridian, to its intersection with the left bank of the Elbow River; thence south-easterly downstream along the said left bank to its intersection with the north boundary of the north-east quarter of section 19, township 23, range 1, west of the 5th meridian; thence easterly along the north boundary of sections 19 to 24. township 23, range 1, west of the 5th meridian and sections 21 and 22, township 23, range 29, west of the 4th meridian and the east boundary of sections 3, 10, 15, 22, 27 and 35, township 24, range 29, west of the 4th meridian and the east boundary of sections 3 and 10, township 25, range 29, west of the 4th meridian to the point of commencement.
Note: The boundaries came into force in 1952.

=== Electoral history ===
The first iteration of the Calgary provincial electoral district in Alberta was created in the 1905 provincial boundary distribution. The district was known in that first election as Calgary City. Prior to 1905, when Calgary was still part of the North-West Territories, there were two districts East Calgary and West Calgary, which were split from the original Calgary North-West Territories district in 1894. Calgary district first came into existence when Calgary had a sufficiently large population to meet the requirements to elect members in the North-West Territories in 1884.

The first election in the district was held with the provincial general election of 1905. The election saw Liberal Minister of Public Works William Cushing win election against Conservative leader Richard Bennett. Cushing was named to the Rutherford prior to the election.

The number of seats in Calgary was increased to two in 1909. In that election Bennett and Cushing both won election, each elector in Calgary had two votes to vote for each seat. Bennett resigned to run for federal office and a by-election was held in 1911 to replace him.

The district was abolished and broken up into three electoral districts in 1913. The ridings were South Calgary, Centre Calgary, and North Calgary. In 1921 the Liberal government promised to bring in proportion representation. They did not and instead decided to combine the three Calgary districts and add two more seats. Voters had the option of casting up to five votes and the top five candidates were elected by plurality Block Voting). As previously under Block Voting, Calgary voters did not vote the straight party line and two Independent, two Labour and a Liberal MLA were elected.

The United Farmers of Alberta passed legislation in 1924 that changed both Edmonton and Calgary to Single Transferable Vote multi-member districts. The rest of the province had single member constituencies and used Alternative Vote, where vote transfers were conducted if the leading candidate did not have a clear majority of 50% on the first count.

The 1926 and 1930 elections saw Calgary elect all opposition candidates because the United Farmers government decided not to field any candidates there. Under Single Transferable Voting the number of spoiled ballots jumped sharply as a sizable number of electors continued marking ballots with an "X". Calgary's first STV election produced mixed representation with no party taking all the seats. The 1935 election saw Social Credit candidates sweep to power But Calgary again elected a mixture of SC and non-SC MLAs.

By the 1950s, Calgary and Edmonton had gone through significant growth. arriving at the final results in both cities would take days and was complicated in terms of counting the vote transfers. The length in terms of names on the ballots was causing long line-ups at polling stations, with electors taking as long as 15 minutes to mark their preferences. However, Calgary's ballot in 1955 held only 23 names and the voter was under no dictate to rank all the candidates on the list.

In 1957 the Social Credit government passed legislation standardizing the electoral system to First Past the Post across the province. The government passed a separate redistribution bill that divided Calgary and Edmonton into single member districts. In Calgary those districts were Calgary West, Calgary Glenmore, Calgary Bowness, Calgary North East, Calgary South East, Calgary Centre, and Calgary North. The last election held in the district, a by-election in 1957, was conducted under the first past the post method.

=== Party composition by date ===
==== 1905–1913 ====
Affiliation	1905	1909	1911	
Affiliation	Nov 9	Mar 22	Sep 21	Oct 31
Liberal	1			
Conservative	0	1	0	1
Vacant	0		1	0
Total	1	2		

==== 1921–1959 ====
Affiliation	1921	1922	1923	1926	1930	1932	1933		1934	1935	1937	1940	1943	1944	1948	1952		1955	1957	
Affiliation	Jul 18	Nov 14	Jan 15	Jun 28	Jun 19	Oct 14	Jan 19	Nov 10	Jan 15	Aug 22	Aug 9	Mar 21	May 23	Jul 8	Aug 17	Mar 1	Aug 5	Jun 29	?	Oct 2
Liberal	1				2			1	2	1		0			1			2		
Conservative	0			2	3	2				1										
Progressive Conservative																	1		0	1
Social Credit										4	3	2	1	2		3	4	3		
Co-operative Commonwealth							0							1			0			
Dominion Labor	2			1																
Canadian Labor					1					0										
Independent Labor	0			1	0															
Independent	2	1	2	0			1			0	1	3		2	1	0				
Vacant	0	1	0			1	0	1	0				1	0					1	0
Total	5				6							5					6			

=== Members of the Legislative Assembly (MLAs) ===
Members of the Legislative Assembly for Calgary
Assembly		Seat 1		Seat 2		Seat 3		Seat 4		Seat 5		Seat 6	
Assembly		Name	Party	Name	Party	Name	Party	Name	Party	Name	Party	Name	Party
1st	1905	William Cushing	Lib.										
2nd	1909	William Cushing	Lib.	Richard Bennett	Con.								
2nd	1911	William Cushing	Lib.	Thomas Tweedie	Con.								
See Centre Calgary, North Calgary and South Calgary 1913-1921
5th	1921	Alex Ross	Dom. Lab.	Robert Edwards	Ind.	Fred White	Dom. Lab.	Robert Marshall	Lib.	Robert Pearson	Ind.		
5th	1923	Alex Ross	Dom. Lab.	William Davidson	Ind.	Fred White	Dom. Lab.	Robert Marshall	Lib.	Robert Pearson	Ind.		
6th	1926	Alexander McGillivray	Con.	George Webster	Lib.	Fred White	Dom. Lab.	John Irwin	Con.	Robert Parkyn	IL		
7th	1930	Hugh Farthing	Con.	George Webster	Lib.	Fred White	Can. Lab.	John Irwin	Con.	John Bowlen	Lib.	Harold McGill	Con.
7th	1933	Hugh Farthing	Con.	George Webster	Lib.	Fred White	Can. Lab.	John Irwin	Con.	John Bowlen	Lib.	Norman Hindsley	Ind.
7th	1934	Hugh Farthing	Con.	William Ross	Lib.	Fred White	Can. Lab.	John Irwin	Con.	John Bowlen	Lib.	Norman Hindsley	Ind.
8th	1935	Edith Gostick	SC	Ernest Manning	SC	Fred Anderson	SC	John Irwin	Con.	John Bowlen	Lib.	John Hugill	SC
8th	1937	Edith Gostick	SC	Ernest Manning	SC	Fred Anderson	SC	John Irwin	Con.	John Bowlen	Lib.	John Hugill	Ind.
8th	1940	Edith Gostick	SC	Ernest Manning	SC	Fred Anderson	SC	John Irwin	Con.	John Bowlen	Ind.	John Hugill	Ind.
9th	1940	James Mahaffy	Ind.	William Aberhart	SC	Fred Anderson	SC	Andrew Davison	Ind.	John Bowlen	Ind.		
9th	1943	James Mahaffy	Ind.	Vacant		Fred Anderson	SC	Andrew Davison	Ind.	John Bowlen	Ind.		
10th	1944	Rose Wilkinson	SC	Howard MacDonald	Ind.	Fred Anderson	SC	Andrew Davison	Ind.	Aylmer Liesemer	CCF		
11th	1948	Rose Wilkinson	SC	Howard MacDonald	Ind.	Fred Colborne	SC	Hugh MacDonald	Lib.	Aylmer Liesemer	CCF		
11th	1952	Rose Wilkinson	SC	Howard MacDonald	SC	Fred Colborne	SC	Hugh MacDonald	Lib.	Aylmer Liesemer	CCF		
12th	1952	Rose Wilkinson	SC	Howard MacDonald	SC	Fred Colborne	SC	Hugh MacDonald	Lib.	Paul Brecken	PC	Arthur Dixon	SC
13th	1955–1957	Rose Wilkinson	SC	Arthur Smith	PC	Fred Colborne	SC	Hugh MacDonald	Lib.	Grant MacEwan	Lib.	Arthur Dixon	SC
13th	1957	Rose Wilkinson	SC	Vacant		Fred Colborne	SC	Hugh MacDonald	Lib.	Grant MacEwan	Lib.	Arthur Dixon	SC
13th	1957–1959	Rose Wilkinson	SC	Ernest Watkins	PC	Fred Colborne	SC	Hugh MacDonald	Lib.	Grant MacEwan	Lib.	Arthur Dixon	SC
See Calgary North East, Calgary South East 1959-1963, Calgary Bowness, Calgary Centre, Calgary North 1959-1971, Calgary Glenmore, Calgary West 1959-present

== Election results ==
=== 1905 ===
The Calgary electoral district was created when Alberta became a province independent of the North-West Territories in 1905. Calgary had previously had two seats when it was represented in the Legislative Assembly of the North-West Territories. This change created controversy because Conservatives accused the Liberals of creating more seats in northern Alberta where their support and organization was stronger. The two riding's previously represented in the city were West Calgary and East Calgary.

1905 Alberta general election results		Turnout unknown		Swing	
Affiliation	Candidate	Votes	%	Party	Personal
Liberal	William Cushing	1,030	42.39%	*	
Conservative	Richard Bennett	993	40.86%	*	
Labor	Alex D. Macdonald	407	16.75%	*	
Total		2,430	100%		
Rejected, spoiled and declined		Records not kept			
Unknown eligible electors
Liberal pickup new district				Swing N/A	
Returning Officer Ruben Askin Janes

The election was a three-way contest but was primarily a two-way race. Richard Bennett the Conservative candidate and party leader was a well known lawyer and former North-West Territories MLA. William Henry Cushing the Liberal candidate had previously been a prominent Calgary municipal politician including serving as mayor. He also had a number of private enterprises in the building materials industry. Rounding out the field was labor activist and independent candidate Alex Macdonald.

The 1905 election was mired in controversy as election results see-sawed back and forth, claims of Conservative supporters being denied access to polling stations were made with supporters of Cushing having been found to run the polling stations. After the official results were released Cushing was declared the winner by 47 votes. Macdonald placed well behind in third place but still with a respectable showing taking close to 20% of the popular vote. The result in Calgary had been seen by the Conservatives as an embarrassing personal defeat for Bennett as the party got nearly shut out of office province wide. Bennett quickly resigned as leader and was replaced by Albert Robertson.

=== 1909 ===
About 6,000 voters cast votes in this election.

1909 Alberta general election results		Turnout N/A%		
Affiliation	Candidate	Votes	%	
Liberal	William Cushing	2,579	26.90%	
Conservative	Richard Bennett	2,423	25.27%	
Liberal	William Egbert	1,933	20.16%	*
Conservative	Thomas Blow	1,907	19.88%	*
Socialist	George Howell	747	7.79%	*
Total		9,589	100%	
Rejected, spoiled and declined		Records not kept		
Unknown eligible electors
Returns, percentages and swing by party: Affiliation / Votes / Percent / Seats / Swing; Liberal / 4,512 / 47.06% / 1 / 4.50%; Conservative / 4,330 / 45.15% / 1 / 6.72%; Socialist / 747 / 7.79% / 0 / *; Liberal hold / / / / Swing 5.61%; Conservative pickup new seat / / / / Swing 5.61%

The 1909 Alberta general election saw a second seat added to the Calgary electoral district. The riding was not split however. Instead the members were elected by Block Voting with electors having the right to select up to two candidates on the ballots. Voters did not cast their votes solidly for the two candidates of their preferred party so members of two different parties were elected.

The Conservatives and Liberals ran a slate of two candidates each, while the Socialists fielded one. William Cushing Minister of Public Works decided to run for a second term in office. The other Liberal candidate was prominent medical doctor William Egbert.

The Conservatives ran former party leader Richard Bennett who had previously contested the district in 1905. Thomas Blow who was also a medical doctor rounded out the slate. Bennett was unanimously acclaimed at the party nominating convention held on March 1, 1909, despite not attending. The second spot on the slate was contested between Blow and J.A. Carson. The two candidates were left over from ten nominees who either had their nomination withdrawn for various reasons or the candidates themselves or refused to let their name stand.

The Socialist Party selected George Howell to be its candidate. Howell worked as the secretary for the Calgary Trades and Labor council. Howell was a surprise choice by the Socialist nominating convention as he had not been running for the party nomination.

The results of the election showed a roughly even split between the Liberals and Conservatives, although with each voter casting up to two votes, the picture is far from clear. Each major candidate received approximately a quarter of the votes cast. But it seems voters did not vote solidly for a slate. The leading candidate of the Liberals and Conservatives took more votes than their running mates, so in the end one of each party took the seats. The Conservatives picked up one seat and the Liberal incumbent held his.

SPC candidate Howell took more votes than the Calgary Labour candidate had taken in 1905. He received support from about 12 percent of the voters. Howell's candidacy was not much of a factor, but Howell kept either of the main parties from gaining a clear majority in the popular vote.

=== 1911 by-election ===
October 31, 1911 by-election results		Turnout unknown		Swing	
Affiliation	Candidate	Votes	%	Party	Personal
Conservative	Thomas Tweedie	2,931	63.65%	18.50%	*
Liberal	Thomas Skinner	1,674	36.35%	-8.80%	*
Total		4,605	100%		
Rejected, spoiled and declined		Records not kept			
Unknown eligible electors
Conservative hold				Swing N/A	

=== 1921 ===
This election was conducted using plurality block voting. Each voter had up to five votes. If all the voters who voted for the leader in the polls, Alex Ross, the most-popular Dominion Labour man, had voted consistently for the whole DLP slate and if the DLP had run five candidates, DLP would have taken all the seats. But as voters did not place all their votes along party lines, mixed representation was produced.

The five seats offered only limited flexibility. The Liberals received just shy of enough votes to win two seats; the Conservatives far more than needed to win two. But the results, rough as they were, were relatively fair.

1921 Alberta general election results		Turnout 53.82%		Swing
Affiliation	Candidate	Votes	%	Personal
Dominion Labor	Alex Ross	7,294	9.64%	*
Independent	Robert Edwards	6,400	8.46%	*
Dominion Labor	Fred White	6,190	8.18%	*
Liberal	Robert Marshall	5,246	6.93%	*
Independent	Robert Pearson	5,141	6.79%	*
Liberal	George Webster	4,391	5.80%	*
Liberal	Clinton Ford	4,230	5.59%	*
Dominion Labor	Robert Parkyn	4,082	5.39%	*
Conservative	Michael Costello	3,808	5.03%	*
Conservative	C.F. Adams	3,332	4.40%	*
Liberal	F. Langford	3,282	4.34%	*
Conservative	Thomas Blow	3,090	4.08%	*
Liberal	F.S. Selwood	2,969	3.92%	*
Independent	Herbert Adshead	2,878	3.80%	*
Independent Labor	Frederick Potts	2,864	3.78%	*
Conservative	Edward Crandell	2,663	3.52%	*
Independent Labor	Hannah Gale	2,386	3.15%	*
Conservative	Samuel Hillocks	2,282	3.02%	*
Socialist	Frank Williams	1,745	2.31%	*
Independent	Alex Davidson	1,423	1.87%	*
Total votes		75,696	100%	
Total ballots		17,187	4.40 votes per ballot	
Rejected, spoiled and declined		90		
32,103 eligible electors
Returns, percentages and swing by party: Affiliation / Votes / Percent / Seats / Swing; Liberal / 20,118 / 26.58% / 1 / *; Dominion Labor / 17,566 / 23.21% / 2 / *; Independent / 15,842 / 20.92% / 2 / *; Conservative / 15,175 / 20.05% / 0 / *; Independent Labor / 5,250 / 6.93% / 0 / *; Socialist / 1,745 / 2.31% / 0 / *; Liberal pickup new seat / / / / Swing N/A%; Dominion Labor pickup two new seats / / / / Swing N/A%; Independent Robert Pearson pick up new seat / / / / Swing N/A%; Independent Robert Edwards pick up new seat / / / / Swing N/A%

Note:

- Voters could cast votes for as many as five candidates.

=== 1921 by-election ===
December 9, 1921 by-election results		Turnout N/A%		Swing	
Affiliation	Candidate	Votes	%	Party	Personal
Dominion Labor	Alex Ross	Acclaimed		*	
Total		N/A	100%		
Rejected, spoiled and declined		N/A			
32,103 eligible electors
Dominion Labor hold				Swing N/A%	

=== 1923 by-election ===
Shortly after the 1923 by-election, a deputy returning officer Alexander Davidson was convicted for voting more than once during the by-election and sentenced to a year in prison and a $400 fine.

January 15, 1923 by-election results		Turnout 57.95%		Swing	
Affiliation	Candidate	Votes	%	Party	Personal
Independent	William Davidson	9,930	54.40%	*	
Citizens' Candidate	Clinton Ford	8,325	45.60%	*	40.01%
Total		18,255	100%		
Rejected, spoiled and declined		Unknown			
31,500 eligible electors
Independent William Davidson pickup vacant seat				Swing 36.75%	

=== 1926 ===
In this election for the first time Calgary elected MLAs through single transferable voting. In the First Count, the five top spots were held by two Conservatives, two Liberals and Parkyn. Vote transfers elevated a DLP candidate to the top positions, while Liberal McClung did not receive many vote transfers and fell out of the top runners.

In the end, Calgary elected a balanced and mixed crop of MLAs — two Conservatives, a Liberal, a DLP-er, and an Independent-Labour man. About 80 percent of the voters saw their vote used to actually elect someone. About half the voters saw their first choice elected; the other 30 percent saw their vote used to elect someone they preferred over others, as well as seeing their first choice elected without the help of their vote.

34,287 eligible electors

1926 Alberta general election results										Turnout 53.82%	
Affiliation	Candidate	Quota (the vote threshold guaranteed to win a seat) 3,290									
Affiliation	Candidate	1st	%	2nd*	3rd*	4th	5th	6th	7th	8th*	9th
Conservative	Alexander McGillivray	5,928	30.04%	3,290							
Conservative	John Irwin	1,662	8.42%	3,334	3,334	3,334	3,334	3,290			
Liberal	George Webster	2,941	14.90%	3,144	3,158	3,191	3,523	3,523	3,290		
Dominion Labor	Fred J. White	1,222	6.19%	1,247	1,248	1,467	1,478	1,479	1,500	2,676	2,923**
Independent Labor	Robert Parkyn	2,467	12.50%	2,506	2,514	2,554	2,582	2,583	2,595	2,664	2,852**
Liberal	Nellie McClung	1,928	9.77%	1,971	1,975	1,980	2,191	2,193	2,363	2,432	2,621
Conservative	Michael Costello	1,221	6.19%	1,817	1,827	1,838	1,864	1,903	1,924	1,946	0
Dominion Labor	Alex Ross	1,265	6.41%	1,282	1,298	1,419	1,444	1,445	1,454	0	
Liberal	Robert Marshall	626	3.17%	651	651	654	0				
Dominion Labor	John Russell	423	2.14%	435	438	0					
Independent	Frederick Potts	54	0.27%	60	0						
Total		19,737	100%	19,737	19,733	19,727	19,716	19,716	19,716	19,598	18,276
Rejected, spoiled and declined 644		Distributed		2,638	56	432	643	44	233	1,336	624
		Exhausted		0	4	6	21	0	0	118	1,322
Returns, percentages and swing by party: Affiliation / 1st count votes / 1st count percent / Seats / 1st count swing; Conservative / 8,811 / 44.65% / 2 / 24.60%; Liberal / 5,496 / 27.84% / 1 / 1.26%; Dominion Labor / 2,910 / 14.74% / 1 / -8.47%; Independent Labor / 2.467 / 12.50% / 1 / 5.57%; Independent / 54 / 0.27% / 0 / -54.13%; Conservative pickup two seats / / / / Swing 18.81%; Liberal hold 1 seat / / / / Swing 18.81%; Dominion Labor hold 1 seat / / / / Swing 18.81%; Independent Labor pickup 1 seat / / / / Swing 18.81%

- *2nd, 3rd, and 8th counts — transfer of surplus votes, because they were not needed by successful candidates elected in previous count.

- **White and Parkyn elected without quota as they were last two candidates in the running with two seats remaining to be filled.

=== 1930 ===
Five MLAs elected through STV

Eligible voters 43,217 Turnout 56.70%

Votes cast: 24,981

Rejected, spoiled and declined 253 votes

Valid votes 24,417

1930 Alberta general election results												
Affiliation	Candidate	Quota (vote threshold guaranteed to take a seat) 3489*										
Affiliation	Candidate	1st	%	2nd	3rd	4th	5th	6th	7th	8th	9th	10th
Conservative	John Irwin	5,520	22.61%	3,495								
Liberal	George Webster	3,651	14.95%	3,651	3,494							
Canadian Labor	Fred J. White	2,585	10.59%	2,659	2,673	2,874	2,916	3,335	3,515	3,492		
Conservative	Hugh Farthing	2,279	9.33%	2,957	2,966	2,979	2,994	3,001	3,132	3,133	3,731	3,731**
Liberal	John Bowlen	2,598	10.64%	2,667	2,700	2,711	2,721	2,727	2,821	2,823	2,869	3,588
Conservative	Harold McGill	1,634	6.69%	2,226	2,238	2,252	2,260	2,266	2,446	2,449	3,089	3,293
Independent	Robert Parkyn	1,544	6.32%	1,608	1,616	1,699	1,856	1,933	2,056	2,067	2,106	2,296
Liberal	Robert Weir	1,191	4.88%	1,260	1,328	1,339	1,344	1,359	1,502	1,508	1,579	0
Conservative	H.S. Patterson	1,007	4.12%	1,368	1,374	1,382	1,395	1,405	1,480	1,480	0	
Citizens' Candidate	A.C. MacKay	992	4.06%	1,078	1,083	1,092	1,097	1,107	0			
Canadian Labor	W.E. Turner	575	2.36%	589	590	590	590	0				
Communist	John O'Sullivan	460	1.88%	469	469	469	0					
Canadian Labor	Thomas Vickers	381	1.57%	390	391	0						
Exhausted (cumulated)				NA	NA	41	235	275	456	456	592	1008
Total		24,417	100%	24,417	24,417	24,417	24,417	24,417	24,417	24,417	24,417	24,417
Distributed				2,025	157	350	255	550	926	23	1,344	1163
		Returns, percentages and swing by party: Affiliation / 1st count votes / 1st count percent / Seats / 1st count swing; Conservative / 10,440 / 42.75% / 3 / -1.90%; Liberal / 7,440 / 30.47% / 2 / 2.63%; Canadian Labor / 3,541 / 14.52% / 1 / -0.22%; Independent / 1,544 / 6.32% / 0 / 6.05%; Citizens' Candidate / 992 / 4.06% / 0 / *; Communist / 460 / 1.88% / 0 / *; Conservative pickup 1 new seat, hold 2 seats / / / / Swing -2.70%; Liberal pick 1 seat, hold 1 seat / / / / Swing -2.70%; Canadian Labor hold 1 seat / / / / Swing -2.70%										

- * Due to miscalculation perhaps, the quota held by winners in 1930 varied from Irwin's 3495 to White's 3492, with none actually being left with the proper quota of 3489.

- ** in Ninth Count, Farthing held a surplus votes, which could have been transferred but election official saw that the transfer of his approx. 240 surplus votes could not make any different in the order of Parkyn or Weir so proceeded to eliminate Weir.

=== 1933 by-election ===
January 19, 1933 by-election results						Turnout 69.40%		1st count swing
Affiliation	Candidate	13,919 vote threshold						1st count swing
Affiliation	Candidate	1st	%	2nd	3rd	4th	5th	1st count swing
Independent	Norman Hindsley	12,532	45.03%	?	?	?	14,128	%
Canadian Labor	Amelia Turner	10,504	37.74%	?	?	?	12,307	%
Independent Labor	Robert Parkyn	2,003	7.20%	?	?	?		%
Independent	A.C. McKay	1,775	6.37%	?	?			%
United Front	John O'Sullivan	539	1.94%	?				%
Independent	D.R. Crighton	478	1.72%					%
Total		27,831	100%				26,435	
Rejected, spoiled and declined 202		Distributed						
? eligible electors		Exhausted					1396	

The Canadian Labor Party Alberta branch nominated candidate Amelia Turner under their banner. The Co-operative Commonwealth executive decided to support and endorse her election campaign but did not nominate her as a candidate for the organization. Norman Hindsley ran as an independent but was endorsed and supported by the Conservative party.

=== 1934 by-election ===
January 15, 1934 by-election results				Turnout 50.88%		1st count swing
Affiliation	Candidate	10,994 vote threshold				1st count swing
Affiliation	Candidate	1st	%	2nd	3rd	1st count swing
Liberal	William Ross	8,665	39.41%	8,955	10,801	
Canadian Labor + Co-operative Commonwealth	Amelia Turner	8,058	36.65%	8,277	8,326	
People's Candidate	Charles Jamieson	4,168	18.96%	?		
Progressive Labor	Ernest Starr	1,096	4.98%			
Total		21,987	100%		19,127	
Rejected, spoiled and declined 202		Distributed				
? eligible electors		Exhausted			0	

Charles Jamieson was originally nominated as a Conservative candidate but left the party and changed to the People's Candidate banner midway through the election.

=== 1935 ===
1935 ballot transfer results		Turnout 80.39%			
Affiliation	Candidate	5,885 quota			
Affiliation	Candidate	1st	%	Votes	Count
Social Credit	Ernest Manning	6,087	14.78%	6,087	1st
Conservative	John Irwin	2,529	6.14%	6,092	13th
Social Credit	Fred Anderson	5,058	12.28%	6,638	15th
Liberal	John J. Bowlen	3,874	9.41%	8,478	17th
Social Credit	Edith Gostick	3,787	9.19%	5,886	18th
Social Credit	John Hugill	3,152	7.65%	4,399	18th
Social Credit	Walter Little	2,963	7.19%	Eliminated 18th	
Liberal	Robert Wier	1,774	4.31%	Eliminated 16th	
Social Credit	Oscar Devenish	3,032	7.36%	Eliminated 14th	
Conservative	Hugh Farthing	2,090	5.07%	Eliminated 13th	
Labor	Fred J. White	1,024	2.49%	Eliminated 12th	
Liberal	George Millican	1,566	3.80%	Eliminated 11th	
Conservative	Joseph Follett	886	2.15%	Eliminated 10th	
Communist	Pat Lenihan	820	1.99%	Eliminated 9th	
Liberal	Richard Watson	786	1.91%	Eliminated 8th	
Labor	Aylmer Liesemer	449	1.09%	Eliminated 7th	
Independent	Charles Jamieson	469	1.14%	Eliminated 6th	
Conservative	James Milvain	451	1.10%	Eliminated 5th	
Independent Labor	Robert Parkyn	224	0.54%	Eliminated 4th	
Labor	William Southern	172	0.41%	Eliminated 3rd	
Total		41,193	100%	18 counts	

=== 1940 ===
Five members elected Quota 7,653

1940 Alberta general election
Party	Candidate	Votes 1st count	%	Votes final count	Elected
Independent Movement	Andrew Davison	12,465	27.15%	7,653	✓
Social Credit	William Aberhart	12,122	26.40%	7,653	✓
Independent	James Mahaffy	3,645	7.49%	9,449	✓
Independent	John J. Bowlen	3,447	7.51%	7,247	✓
Social Credit	Fred Anderson	1,939	4.22%	8,020	✓
Co-operative Commonwealth	Fred J. White	2,846	6.20%		
Independent	Joseph Tweed Shaw	2,685	5.85%		
Social Credit	Edith Gostick	1,605	3.50%		
Independent	Norman Dingle	1,480	3.22%		
Social Credit	H.D. Tarves	1,386	3.02%		
Co-operative Commonwealth	Robert Alderman	1,298	2.83%		
Independent	Harry Pryde	576	1.26%		
Independent Labor	D. V. Mitchell	251	0.55%		
Independent	J.F.M. Moodie	169	0.35%		
Votes cast		46,619			
Eligible electors / turnout		59,338	78.6%		
Source(s) Note: Five seats were awarded in the Calgary Electoral District through single transferable vote. The Hare Quota, the number of votes needed to win a seat, was 7,653. There were a total of 10 ballot counts with Andrew Davison and William Aberhart elected on the first count.

=== 1944 ===
Five members elected

6,562 quota

(Armed Forces voters are identified separately in the First Count but are included in the un-bracketed total.)

1944 ballot transfer results		Turnout 80.39%			
Affiliation	Candidate	6,562 quota			
Affiliation	Candidate	1st (Forces*)	%	Peak Votes	Count
Independent	Andrew Davison	7,754 (137)		7,754	1st
Social Credit	Fred Anderson	6,655 (123)		6,655	1st
Social Credit	Rose Wilkinson	5,042 (103)		8,338	15th
Independent	Howard MacDonald	2,365 (20)		6,897	17th
CCF	Alymer Liesemer	3,560 (76)		6,077	17th
CCF	Robert Alderman	2,088 (43)		Eliminated 17th	
Independent	John J. Bowlen	2,192 (25)		Eliminated 16th	
Social Credit	Art Larsen	1,351 (33)		Eliminated 15th	
CCF	C.W.J. Helmer	1,655 (72)		Eliminated 14th	
Independent	R.C. Carlile	1,433 (10)		Eliminated 13th	
CCF	Ken Tory	1,462 (49)		Eliminated 12th	
Social Credit	Edward Geehan	1,162 (42)		Eliminated 11th	
Labor-Progressive	Pat Lenihan	491 (25)			Eliminated 10th
Social Credit	C.M. Baker	834 (30)		Eliminated 9th	
CCF	Herbert Wiertz	504 (4)		Eliminated 8th	
Labor-Progressive	Lionel Edwards	304 (3)			Eliminated 7th
Labor-Progressive	Mike Daniels	258 (9)			Eliminated 6th
Labor-Progressive	Gordon Wray	128 (5)			Eliminated 5th
Labor-Progressive	Audrey Staples	71 (1)			Eliminated 4th
Total		39,309 (810)	100%	17 counts	

Note:

- In the 1944 election, some Canadian Forces personnel voted in the Calgary district. They were given special ballots intended to track how they voted. Service vote results are only available for the 1st count. They were included in the 39,309 valid vote total for the district. Later in this election, other Armed Forces voters, who had not already voted, voted for separate representation — by electing an Army, an Air Force and a Navy representative.

=== 1948 ===
Five members elected 39,101 valid votes Quota 6517

1948 Alberta general election
Party	Candidate	Votes 1st count	%	Votes final count
Social Credit	Rose Wilkinson	7,153	18.29%	6,528
Social Credit	Frederick C. Colborne	3,923	10.03%	6,520
Independent	Howard B. Macdonald	3,840	9.82%	6,339
Labour	Peter Newton Russel Morrison	3,579	9.15%	–
Co-operative Commonwealth	Alymer J. E. Liesemer	2,475	6.33%	5,742
Social Credit	James Leslie Hill	2,464	6.30%	–
Liberal	Hugh John MacDonald	1,977	5.06%	6,215
Social Credit	R.B. Estabrook	1,751	4.48%	–
Liberal	J. Roger Flumerfelt	1,691	4.32%	–
Liberal	Mrs. Mary Dover	1,602	4.10%	–
Liberal	Michael J. McCormick	1,237	3.16%	–
Independent	M.V. Anderson	1,233	3.15%	–
Social Credit	George M. Whicher	1,091	2.79%	–
Liberal	Loftus Dudley Ward	949	2.43%	–
Independent Social Credit	A.P. van Buren	737	1.88%	–
Independent	Mrs. Edwina Milvain	578	1.48%	–
Independent Social Credit	Art Larsen	563	1.44%	–
Co-operative Commonwealth	George Ellinson	539	1.38%	–
Co-operative Commonwealth	George R. Austin	518	1.32%	–
Labour Progressive	Terry Levis	516	1.32%	–
Co-operative Commonwealth	W. Orr	442	1.13%	–
Co-operative Commonwealth	Mrs. Mary A. Hart	243	0.62%	–
Total		39,101	–	–
Rejected, spoiled and declined		2,359	–	–
Eligible electors / turnout		76,939	53.98%	-11.02%
Source(s) Source: "Calgary Official Results 1948 Alberta general election". Alberta Heritage Community Foundation. Note: Five seats were awarded in the Calgary Electoral District through single transferable vote. The Hare Quota, the number of votes needed to win a seat, was 6,520.

=== 1952 ===
1952 Alberta general election
Party	Candidate	Votes 1st count	%	Votes final count
Social Credit	Rose Wilkinson	6,796	16.31%	5,967
Social Credit	Howard B. Macdonald	4,214	10.11%	5,957
Social Credit	Frederick C. Colborne	3,974	9.54%	5,959
Conservative	Paul Brecken	3,126	7.50%	6,269
Independent Labour	Donald Fraser McIntosh	2,927	7.02%	–
Social Credit	Thomas Glen	2,820	6.77%	–
Liberal	Hugh John MacDonald	2,711	6.51%	5,216
Social Credit	Arthur J. Dixon	2,677	6.42%	5,966
Social Credit	Clifford Norman Clark	2,390	5.74%	–
Co-operative Commonwealth	Aylmer J. E. Liesemer	1,991	4.78%	–
Conservative	Philip P. C. Haigh	905	2.17%	–
Liberal	Melvin E. Shannon	857	2.06%	–
Conservative	John James Zubick	806	1.93%	–
Conservative	W. R. Irwin	764	1.83%	–
Conservative	Ronald M. Helmer	670	1.61%	–
Co-operative Commonwealth	Robert T. Alderman	633	1.52%	–
Liberal	Alberta Clark	563	1.35%	–
Liberal	Collier Maberley	555	1.33%	–
Labour	W. Longridge	527	1.26%	–
Co-operative Commonwealth	George E. Ellinson	378	0.91%	–
Co-operative Commonwealth	H. J. Ryan	333	0.80%	–
Liberal	Richard Thomson	313	0.75%	–
Liberal	J. A. Murray Green	287	0.69%	–
Co-operative Commonwealth	Harold L. Livegant	243	0.58%	–
Co-operative Commonwealth	Ronald W. Stirling	213	0.51%	–
Total		41,673	–	–
Rejected, spoiled and declined		1,694	–	–
Eligible electors / turnout		91,289	47.51%	-7.47%
Source(s) Source: "Calgary Official Results 1952 Alberta general election". Alberta Heritage Community Foundation. Note: Six seats were awarded in the Calgary Electoral District through single transferable vote. The Hare Quota, the number of votes needed to win a seat, was 5,953. A total of 18 counts occurred.

=== 1955 ===
1955 Alberta general election
Party	Candidate	Votes 1st count	%	Votes final count
Conservative	Arthur Ryan Smith	9,745	15.59%	8,940
Liberal	Hugh John MacDonald	7,501	12.00%	8,932
Social Credit	Frederick C. Colborne	5,470	8.75%	8,931
Conservative	Paul Brecken	5,034	8.06%	–
Social Credit	Rose Wilkinson	4,973	7.96%	8,930
Social Credit	Arthur J. Dixon	4,566	7.31%	7,698
Social Credit	Howard B. MacDonald	4,423	7.08%	–
Liberal	Grant MacEwan	4,019	6.43%	8,338
Liberal	V. A. Cooney	2,536	4.06%	–
Social Credit	Ian F. Smith	2,290	3.66%	–
Social Credit	C. M. Willmott	1,745	2.79%	–
Social Credit	E. R. A. Temple	1,715	2.74%	–
Co-operative Commonwealth	G. E. Ellinson	1,277	2.04%	–
Liberal	Mary Dover	1,201	1.92%	–
Liberal	Harold Cush	1,065	1.70%	–
Liberal	Collier Maberley	1,025	1.64%	–
Conservative	Roy V. Devell	927	1.48%	–
Co-operative Commonwealth	Herbert J. Ryan	648	1.04%	–
Labour Progressive	A.L. Roberts	579	0.93%	–
Conservative	P. P. C. Haigh	577	0.92%	–
Independent	Arthur H. Wray	471	0.75%	–
Co-operative Commonwealth	K. A. Halliday	462	0.74%	–
Co-operative Commonwealth	Paul J. Katzalay	245	0.39%	–
Total		62,494	–	–
Rejected, spoiled and declined		2,166	–	–
Eligible electors / turnout		106,609	60.65%	+13.15%
Source(s) Source: "Calgary Official Results 1955 Alberta general election". Alberta Heritage Community Foundation. Note: Six seats were awarded in the Calgary Electoral District through single transferable vote. The Hare Quota, the number of votes needed to win a seat, was 8,890. A total of 10 counts occurred.

=== 1957 by-election ===
October 2, 1957 by-election results		Turnout 34.37%		Swing	
Affiliation	Candidate	Votes	%	Party	Personal
Progressive Conservative	Ernest Watkins	17,565	43.69%		*
Social Credit	Samuel Helman	15,010	37.33%		*
Labor	Frank Bodie	3,916	9.74%	*	
Liberal	Reginald McCollough	3,023	7.52%		*
Independent	Cliff Harris	693	1.72%	*	
Total		40,207	100%		
Rejected, spoiled and declined		Unknown			
117,000 eligible electors
Progressive Conservative hold				Swing ?%	

The October 1957 by-election held on October 2, 1957, was the last election held in the Calgary electoral district before it was officially split in 1959. This was the first election province wide since Single Transferable Vote was implemented in 1924 that First Past the Post was put to use. The changes were implemented in 1956 in An Act Representing Members of the Legislative Assembly.

The election was called after Progressive Conservative incumbent, Arthur Ryan Smith resigned to run in the 1957 Canadian federal election.

Five candidates offered themselves in the election. Social Credit ran high-profile lawyer Samuel Helman. During the campaign Premier Ernest Manning promised to promote Helman to Attorney General as soon as he was elected to the district. The Progressive Conservatives ran lawyer Ernest Watkins, who had arrived from England in 1952. Rounding out the field was Frank Bodie who ran on a Labor banner. Liberal candidate Reginald McCollough and Independent Cliff Harris who was running in the election to protest Alberta's liquor laws in force at the time.

The election proved to be low turnout with 35% of 117,000 eligible voters casting ballots in the election. Advanced turnout was very quiet with just 148 votes being cast. Ernest Watkins won with 43% of the vote and held the seat for his party. The race turned out to be a primarily two-way race, with the other three candidates finishing well back.

== Plebiscite district results ==
=== 1948 electrification plebiscite ===
District results from the province wide plebiscite on electricity regulation:

Option A	Option B
Are you in favour of the generation and distribution of electricity being continued by the Power Companies?	Are you in favour of the generation and distribution of electricity being made a publicly owned utility administered by the Alberta Government Power Commission?
26,325 69.63%	11,478 30.37%
Province wide result: Option A passed.

=== 1957 liquor plebiscite ===
1957 Alberta liquor plebiscite results: Calgary
Question A: Do you approve additional types of outlets for the sale of beer, wine and spirituous liquor subject to a local vote?
Ballot choice	Votes	%
Yes	47,382	77.41%
No	13,830	22.59%
Total votes	61,212	100%
Rejected, spoiled and declined	391	
114,986 eligible electors, turnout 53.57%
Question B1: Should mixed drinking be allowed in beer parlours in Calgary and the surrounding areas?
Ballot choice	Votes	%
Yes	49,669	81.12%
No	11,561	18.88%
Total votes	61,230	100%
Rejected, spoiled and declined	379	
114,986 eligible electors, turnout 53.58%

On October 30, 1957, a stand-alone plebiscite was held province wide in all 50 of the then current provincial electoral districts in Alberta. The government decided to consult Alberta voters to decide on liquor sales and mixed drinking after a divisive debate in the legislature. The plebiscite was intended to deal with the growing demand for reforming antiquated liquor control laws.

The plebiscite was conducted in two parts. Question A, asked in all districts, asked the voters if the sale of liquor should be expanded in Alberta, while Question B, asked in a handful of districts within the corporate limits of Calgary and Edmonton, asked if men and women should be allowed to drink together in establishments. Question B was slightly modified depending on which city the voters were in.

Province wide Question A of the plebiscite passed in 33 of the 50 districts while Question B passed in all five districts. Calgary voted overwhelmingly in favour of the plebiscite posting a super majority for the yes side. The district recorded a strong voter turnout, well above the province wide average of 46%.

Calgary also voted on question B1 to decide the issue of allowing men and women to drink together within the corporate limits of Calgary. Like question A, city residents also voted for mixed drinking with a super majority. Oddly question B1 experienced a slightly higher voter turnout than question A.

Official district returns were released to the public on December 31, 1957. The Social Credit government in power at the time did not consider the results binding. However the results of the vote led the government to repeal all existing liquor legislation and introduce an entirely new Liquor Act.

Municipal districts lying inside electoral districts that voted against the plebiscite were designated Local Option Zones by the Alberta Liquor Control Board and considered effective dry zones. Business owners who wanted a license had to petition for a binding municipal plebiscite in order to be granted a license.

== See also ==
- List of Alberta provincial electoral districts
- Canadian provincial electoral districts
