= Norman Hindsley =

Canadian politician

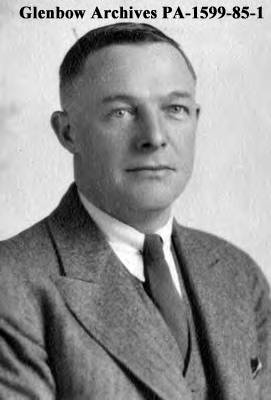

Member of the Legislative Assembly of Alberta for Calgary
- In office 1933–1935
- Preceded by: Harold McGill
- Succeeded by: Edith Gostick; Ernest Manning; Fred Anderson; John Hugill

Personal details
- Born: February 11, 1886 Walsall, Staffordshire, England
- Died: January 30, 1966 (aged 79)
- Party: Independent
- Occupation: accountant

Norman Hindsley (February 11, 1886 – January 30, 1966) was a Canadian politician, accountant and published author from Alberta.

Hindsley was born in Walsall, Staffordshire, England, to Thomas and Lucy Hindsley. He emigrated, arriving in Alberta in 1910.

In 1927, Norman wrote a report Into the Advisability of the Establishment of a Forty-Eight Hour Working Week in Alberta the title was published by the University of Alberta.

Norman Hindsley was elected to the Legislative Assembly of Alberta in a hotly contested 1933 Calgary by-election after the resignation of Harold McGill. The by-election shaped up to be a tight race between Norman and Amelia Turner who ran under a combined Labor/Cooperative Commonwealth banner. Norman edged out Amelia to take the seat.

He served in the legislature until the 1935 Alberta general election as an Independent but did not run for re-election.

Legislative Assembly of Alberta
Preceded by Harold McGill	MLA Calgary #6; 1933–1935	Succeeded by Ernest Manning; Fred Anderson; Edith Gostick; John Hugill
