= Aylmer Liesemer =

Canadian politician

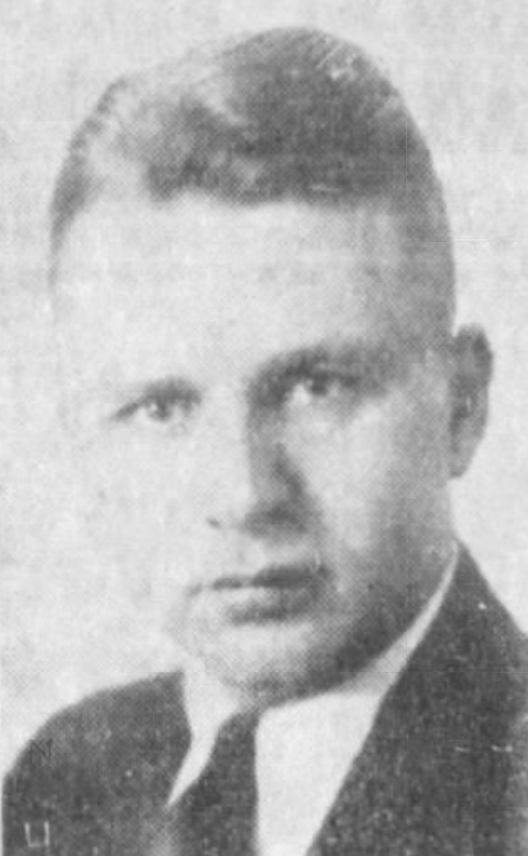
- Pictured as a City of Calgary Alderman, ca. 1936

Member of the Legislative Assembly of Alberta for Calgary
- In office 1944–1952
- Preceded by: William Aberhart; James Mahaffey; John J. Bowlen
- Succeeded by: Paul Brecken; Arthur J. Dixon

Personal details
- Born: November 27, 1905 Didsbury, Alberta, Canada
- Died: January 4, 1995 (aged 89) Toronto, Ontario, Canada
- Party: Co-operative Commonwealth

Aylmer John Eggert Liesemer (November 27, 1905 – January 4, 1995) was a Canadian politician and teacher.

== Early life ==
Liesemer was born in Didsbury, Alberta in 1905. He received all of his early public grade school in Didsbury with the exception of 1 year in Calgary.

In 1921 and 1922, Liesemer attended Normal School in Calgary at what became the Administration Building for the Southern Alberta Institute of Technology. He was one of the first class of graduates from that school.

Liesemer became a teacher and taught in Didsbury and Calgary. He started teaching High School students in 1930 through to his retirement in 1970. He was an instructor in history, geography and social studies at Crescent Heights High School in Calgary. He kept teaching while still performing his duties in the public offices he held.

== Politics ==
=== Calgary city council ===
Liesemer served as a Labour alderman for the city of Calgary from 1934 to 1937. In 1937 he challenged incumbent Mayor Andrew Davison but failed in his bid to defeat the mayor.

=== Provincial and federal elections ===
Aylmer Liesemer first ran as a Labor politician in the 1935 Alberta general election and was badly defeated finishing 15th out of 20 candidates.

Liesemer ran for a federal seat in the 1940 Canadian federal election in the Bow River electoral district. He ran as a Cooperative Commonwealth Federation candidate, placing 4th out of 5 candidates. Incumbent MP Charles Edward Johnston was re-elected.

Liesemer ran in the 1944 Alberta general election, this time as a candidate for the provincial Cooperative Commonwealth. He won a Calgary seat in the city-wide vote conducted using single transferable voting. Aylmer was reelected in the 1948 Alberta general election but was defeated in the 1952 Alberta general election.

He ran in Calgary North in the 1959 Alberta general election but was badly defeated by sitting MLA Rose Wilkinson of the Social Credit party.

== Later life ==
He died in Toronto in 1995 at the age of 89.

Legislative Assembly of Alberta
Preceded by William Aberhart; James Mahaffey; John J. Bowlen	MLA Calgary; 1944–1952	Succeeded by Paul Brecken; Arthur J. Dixon
