= Fred J. White =

Canadian politician

Frederic James White
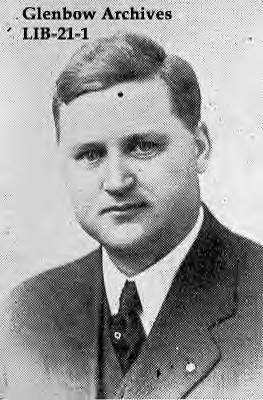
- Fred J. White in 1929

Member of the Legislative Assembly for Calgary
- In office 1921–1935
- Preceded by: William Henry Cushing; Thomas Tweedie
- Succeeded by: Edith Gostick; Ernest Manning; Fred Anderson; John Hugill

Alderman on Calgary City Council
- In office January 1, 1940 – September 30, 1941
- In office January 29, 1929 – December 31, 1935
- In office January 2, 1919 – January 3, 1927

Personal details
- Born: October 27, 1886 Port Credit, Ontario, Canada
- Died: October 10, 1967 (aged 80) Guelph, Ontario, Canada
- Party: Dominion Labor; Co-operative Commonwealth
- Spouse: Edith Louise White

Frederic James White (October 27, 1886 – October 10, 1967) was a provincial level politician and labour activist in Canada. He was a Labour Party Calgary city councillor from 1918 to 1926 and in two more periods as well. He served as Labour Party MLA (member of the Legislative Assembly of Alberta) from 1921 to 1935 as one of the members representing Calgary.

== Early life ==
Frederick James White was born in September 1886, at Port Credit, Ontario. He resided in Hamilton, Ontario until 1898. He moved to Guelph with his family and got his first job at the age of 15 working at the Guelph Mercury.

In 1905, he went to work for the Harley Watkins Printing Co. in Brantford as a printer. In 1907 he decided to travel, visiting Montreal and the United Kingdom. In 1910, White decided to travel to western Canada. He found work as a printer in Calgary.

== Municipal political career ==
White became involved in the Calgary Labor movement. In 1918 he ran for municipal council and was elected. He served from January 2, 1919 to January 3, 1927.

He served again on city council from January 29, 1929 to December 31, 1935.

His third stint on council was from January 1, 1940 to September 30, 1941.

== Provincial political career ==
White was elected to a Calgary seat in the Alberta Legislature in the 1921 Alberta general election. Calgary elected its MLAs in a single multi-member district through block voting in 1921. It elected five MLAs. Ross took a seat with the support of 6000 of the city's 17,000 voters that voted this time. He ran under the Dominion Labor Party banner in the election. White continued to hold his seat on Calgary city council.

White became leader of the Dominion Labor Party and led the group into the 1926 Alberta general election. This time Calgary elected its MLAs in a single multi-member district through Single transferable voting. Again it elected five MLAs. In the first count, White placed seventh out of 11 candidates, just after fellow Labour candidate Alexander Ross. White gradually accumulated more votes than Ross through vote transfers under STV rules as others were eliminated or elected. Ross was eliminated in the 8th Count, while White went on to be elected.

When one more candidate was eliminated as part of the STV process, White survived and then he was among the last three remaining unelected uneliminated candidates, with two open seats remaining. MLA Nellie McClung, being the least popular of the three, was eliminated, and White and Robert Parkyn took the two seats on the tenth vote count.

Overall in the province 5 out of 12 Labor candidates were elected to the legislature. (White was of the Dominion Labour Party while in Edmonton Lionel Gibbs was a Canadian Labour Party MLA.) White continued on as leader of the Labour group in the legislature.

White led the party into the 1930 Alberta general election. The Dominion Labor Party lost a seat but White was re-elected to his Calgary seat.

Again Calgary elected its MLAs in a single multi-member district through Single transferable vote. It elected six MLAs. White was in fourth place in the First Count and achieved the quota to take a seat on the 7th count. STV produces mixed representation in each STV district. Calgary in 1930 was no exception. Besides White (Labour), Calgary elected three Conservatives and two Liberal MLAs in 1930.

In 1932 White was a delegate to the founding meeting of the Co-operative Commonwealth Federation. He became a founding member of the party when its first convention was held in Regina in 1933.

Despite being part of the Co-operative Commonwealth Federation (CCF), the Dominion Labor Party ran in the 1935 Alberta general election. White continued on as leader. He was defeated on the 12th count, finishing 11th place in the standings. Province-wide, Dominion Labor was wiped out, losing all seats as William Aberhart's Social Credit party made great advances.

White ran as a candidate for the CCF in the 1940 Alberta general election. He placed fifth in the first count and never achieved the quota in the subsequent rounds of counting as per STV rules. He was eventually declared defeated.

== Later life ==
White decided to move back to Guelph in 1942. He became Treasurer of the Guelph Labor Council upon his return. He lived the rest of his life in Guelph, dying on October 10, 1967.
