= William Henry Ross =

Canadian politician

MLA for Calgary
- In office 1934–1935
- Preceded by: George Webster
- Succeeded by: Edith Gostick; Ernest Manning; Fred Anderson; John Hugill

Personal details
- Party: Liberal

William Henry Ross (January 13, 1886 – October 29, 1943) was a provincial level politician from Alberta, Canada. He served as a member of the Calgary city council from 1924 to 1926 and in the Legislative Assembly of Alberta from 1934 to 1935.

Ross ran for a Calgary seat in the Alberta Legislature in a by-election held on January 15, 1934 after the death of George Harry Webster. He won a third count victory to hold the seat for the Liberals. (The by-election was held using instant-runoff voting).

Ross did not run for re-election in the 1935 Alberta general election.
