= Paul Brecken =

Canadian politician

MLA for Calgary
- In office August 5, 1952 – June 28, 1955

Calgary City Council Alderman
- In office January 1, 1948 – December 31, 1949
- In office January 2, 1952 – September 4, 1960

Personal details
- Born: September 28, 1886 Halifax, Nova Scotia
- Died: September 4, 1960 (aged 73) Calgary, Alberta
- Party: Progressive Conservative

Paul Ralph Brecken (September 28, 1886, in Halifax, Nova Scotia – September 4, 1960, in Calgary, Alberta) was a municipal and provincial level politician and World War I veteran and teacher from Alberta, Canada.

== Early life ==
Brecken completed high school in 1908 and went on to the University of Toronto in 1909 where he earned a Bachelor of Arts degree in Science. He married Jessie Copeland from Winnipeg, Manitoba in 1910 and they moved to Calgary before the outbreak of World War I, where he became general secretary of the YMCA.

== Military career ==
Brecken left to fight overseas as an officer for the Canadian Expeditionary Force 4th Brigade in 1914. He returned home after being wounded in action in 1918; he became a longtime member of the Royal Canadian Legion after his military career.

== Teaching career ==
After Brecken returned home from the war, he went back to school attending Normal School in Edmonton, Alberta, graduating in 1921.

He then became a teacher at Crescent Heights High School in Calgary where he taught from 1921 to 1951. He got involved in city politics near the end of his teaching career, winning a seat as an alderman. During his teaching years, he became a member and later General Secretary of the Kiwanis Capital District, and was also involved with the Canadian Club.

== Municipal politics ==
Brecken served two stints as an alderman for the City of Calgary. The first was for one year from January 1, 1948, to December 31, 1949. He then served as alderman from January 1, 1952, until his death on September 4, 1960. He simultaneously served as a provincial representative from 1952 to 1955.

== Provincial politics ==
Brecken was elected to the Legislative Assembly of Alberta as a member of the Conservative party in the 1952 Alberta general election and served one term before being defeated in the 1955 Alberta general election.

Legislative Assembly of Alberta
Preceded by Aylmer Liesemer	MLA Calgary; 1952–1955	Succeeded by Arthur Ryan Smith; Grant MacEwan
