= James Mahaffy =

Canadian politician

James Caven Mahaffy

Leader of the Official Opposition in Alberta
- In office February 18, 1943 – March 30, 1943
- Preceded by: Alfred Speakman
- Succeeded by: James H. Walker

MLA for Calgary
- In office 1940–1944
- Preceded by: Edith Gostick; Ernest Manning; John Irwin; John Hugill
- Succeeded by: Rose Wilkinson; Howard MacDonald; Aylmer Liesemer

Personal details
- Born: August 29, 1905 Port Elgin, Ontario
- Died: November 29, 1986 (aged 81)
- Party: Independent Movement

James Caven Mahaffy (August 29, 1905 – November 29, 1986) was a provincial level politician from Alberta, Canada. He served as a member of the Legislative Assembly of Alberta from 1940 to 1944. Mahaffy held a seat in the electoral district of Calgary as an Independent. Mahaffy briefly served as Leader of the Opposition.

== Political career ==
Mahaffy ran for a seat in the 1940 Alberta general election. He was elected to the third seat in the Calgary electoral district as an Independent under the Alberta Unity Movement.

He briefly served as Leader of the Opposition during the 3rd Session of the 9th Alberta Legislative Assembly.

Mahaffy did not run for a second term in 1944.
