= John Irwin (politician) =

Canadian politician

John Irwin Sr.
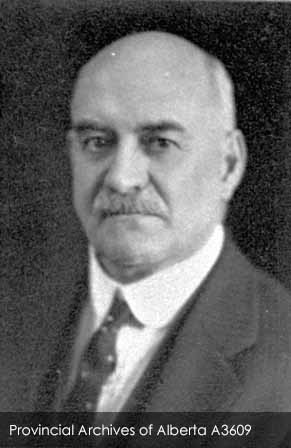

Member of the Legislative Assembly of Alberta
- In office June 28, 1926 – March 21, 1940
- Preceded by: William Davidson, Robert Marshall, Robert Pearson and Alex Ross
- Succeeded by: William Aberhart, Andrew Davison and James Mahaffy
- Constituency: Calgary

Personal details
- Born: October 10, 1869 Picton, Ontario
- Died: May 7, 1948 (aged 78) Victoria, British Columbia
- Party: Conservative
- Children: Leslie H., Ruth A., Fred P., Bessie, Hugh John
- Parents: Henry Irwin (father); Mary Charlton Iriwn (mother)
- Occupation: politician

John Irwin Sr. (October 10, 1869 – May 7, 1948) was a Canadian provincial politician from Alberta. He served as a member of the Legislative Assembly of Alberta from 1926 to 1940 sitting with the Conservative caucus in opposition.

== Early life ==
Irwin was born October 10, 1869, at Picton, Ontario, to Henry (Irish) and Mary Charlton Irwin (English). He was educated in Picton and later moved to Calgary where he married Annetta Brown and together had five children. Irwin was a businessman in Calgary, purchasing the 1903 Calgary Milling Company building on Stephen Avenue in 1912 and turning it into a grocery store specializing in fancy and imported foods. The Calgary Milling Company building has subsequently been designated a Provincial and Municipal Historic Resource under the Historical Resources Act.

== Political career ==
Irwin ran for a seat to the Legislative Assembly of Alberta as a Conservative candidate in the electoral district of Calgary in the 1926 Alberta general election. He won the third place seat out of five in the eleven way race to earn his first term in office.

Irwin ran for a second term in office in the 1930 Alberta general election. He was re-elected finishing in the third place seat once again.

Irwin ran for a third term in office in the 1935 Alberta general election. He withstood the Social Credit landslide becoming one of the few incumbents to retain a seat. He took second place out of six seats available.

Irwin retired from provincial politics at dissolution of the assembly in 1940.

John Irwin's grandson, also named John Irwin, served as Mayor of the Municipality of Crowsnest Pass, Alberta.
