= Andrew Davison (politician) =

Canadian politician

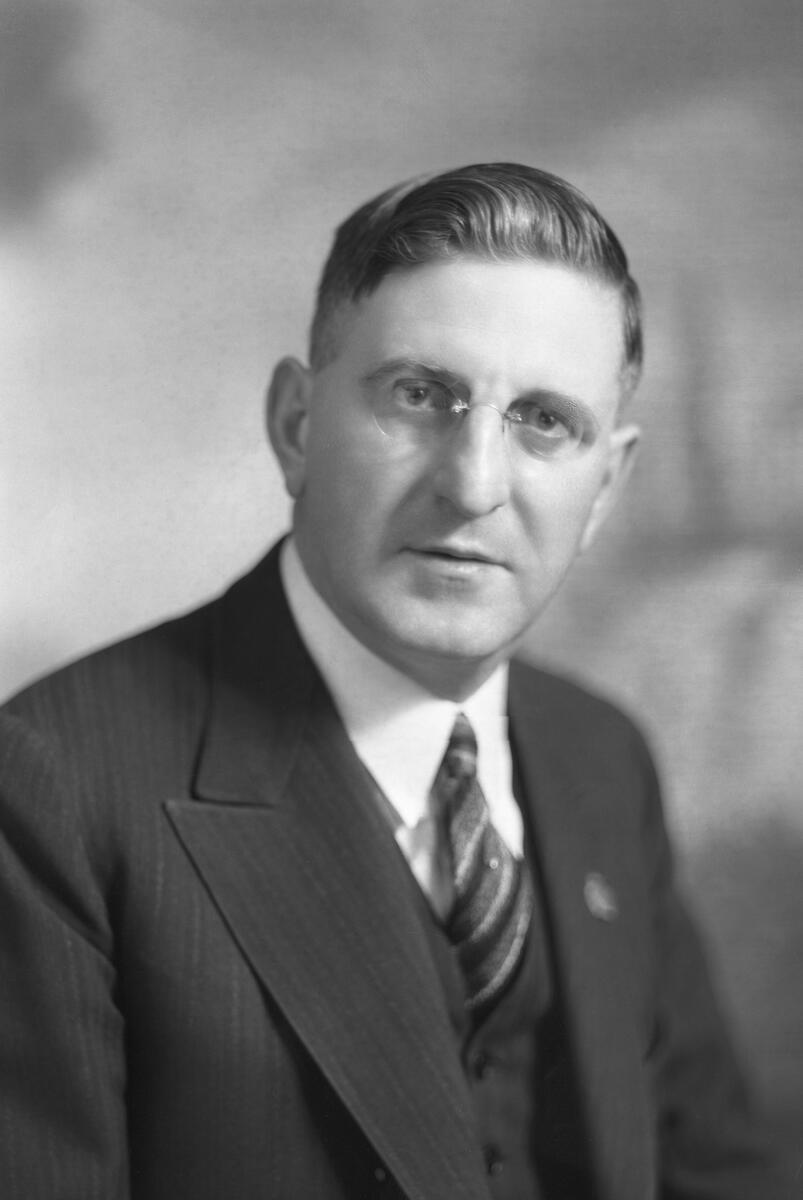

24th Mayor of Calgary
- In office January 1, 1930 – December 31, 1945
- Preceded by: Frederick Ernest Osborne
- Succeeded by: James Cameron Watson

Alderman for The City of Calgary
- In office January 1929 – December 31, 1929
- In office January 3, 1922 – December 31, 1926

Member of the Legislative Assembly of Alberta
- In office March 21, 1940 – August 17, 1948
- Constituency: Calgary

Personal details
- Born: December 18, 1886 Moneymore, County Londonderry, Ireland
- Died: April 6, 1963 (aged 76) Vancouver, British Columbia, Canada
- Spouse: Effie Huggins
- Occupation: Politician; printer

Andrew Davison (December 18, 1886 – April 6, 1963) was a Canadian politician, printer and 24th Mayor of Calgary. He served as alderman from 1922 to 1926 and mayor from 1929 to 1945 - his 15 year term as mayor is the longest in the city's history. He also served as a member of the Alberta Legislature 1940 to 1948.

== Early life ==
Andrew Davison was born on December 18, 1886, in Moneymore, County Londonderry, Ireland to Andrew Davison and Clara Williamson. He arrived in Alberta in 1895 and received his education in both Edmonton and Calgary, and attended Business College in Winnipeg. He married Effie Huggins on December 3, 1912.

Prior to entering politics, Davison worked as a printer, a linotype operator and publisher and was associated with the Calgary Albertan, the News Telegram, and Calgary Herald from after the war to 1929. During the First World War from 1914 to 1918, he served overseas in the London War Office as a Pay Sergeant with the Canadian Army Pay Corps, he was unable to enlist for active combat due to an "eyesight handicap". He served as Pay Master of the Second Battalion, Calgary Highlanders, with the rank of captain, during the Second World War.

== Political career ==
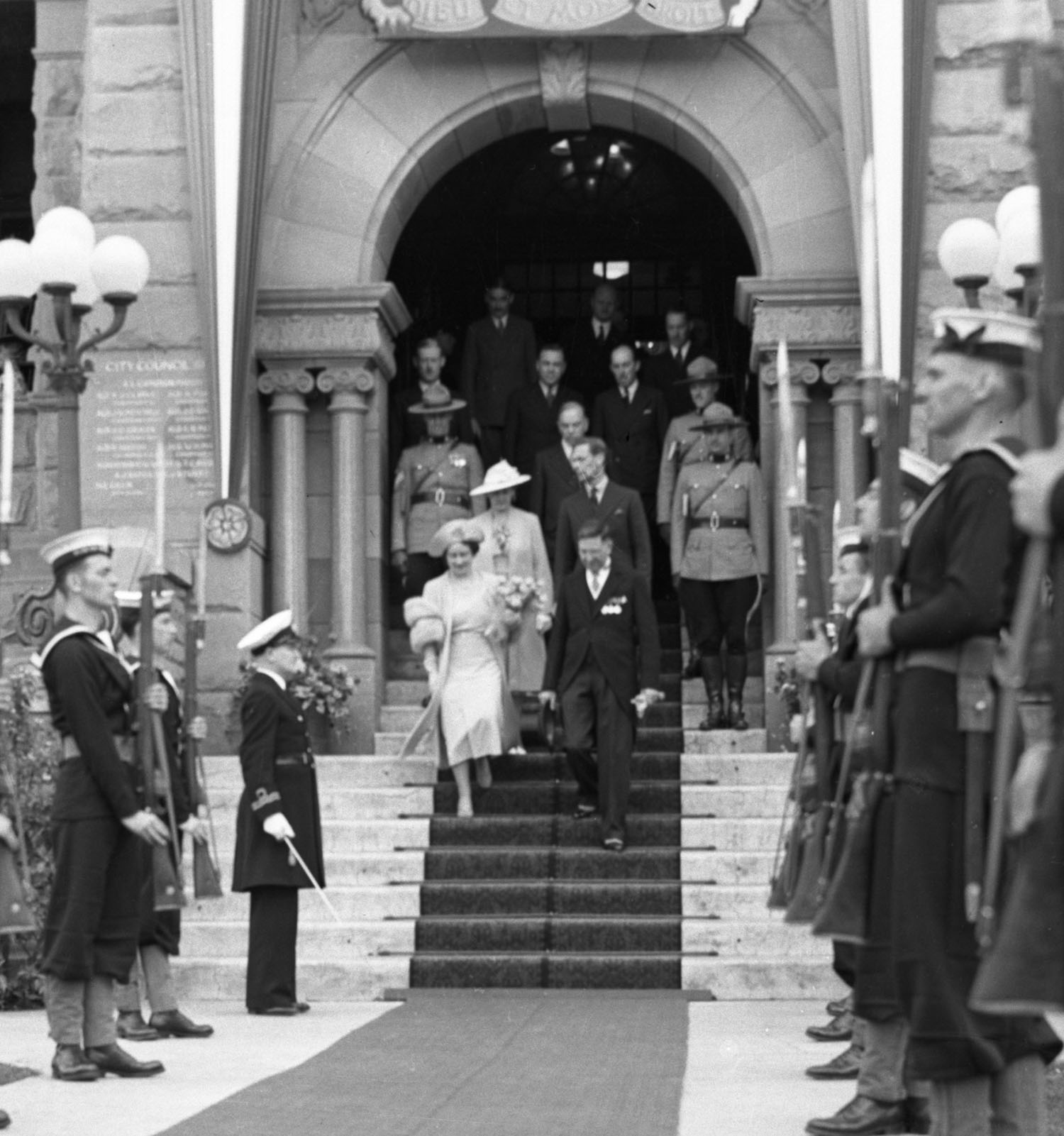
Queen Elizabeth The Queen Mother is escorted down the stairs of Calgary City Hall by Mayor Andrew Davison. Prime Minister William Lyon Mackenzie King is following behind King George VI

Andrew Davison was first elected to Calgary City Council in the 1921 Calgary municipal election as a Labour candidate, his election occurred while he was working at the Calgary Herald as a printer. He served four terms as Alderman from 1922 to 1926.

Then in 1929 he was acclaimed as mayor of Calgary on November 12, 1929. He was re-elected Mayor another seven times, serving a total of sixteen years as the City's Chief Magistrate, a record unequalled before or since.

During Davison's term as mayor, the ambitious and controversial Glenmore Dam waterworks system was completed. The Glenmore Dam and other capital projects placed the City of Calgary heavily into debt, and in 1937 Davison along with Jules Fortain and former mayor Frederick Ernest Osborne proposed the "Fortain Plan" which consolidated the municipality's debt, and shifted the financial burden to future years. This financial adjustment enabled Calgary to afford upgrades to power and transportation services.

Under Davison the City of Calgary began paying Aldermen for their services, with $50 per standing committee meeting attended with a yearly cap of $250. In 1945, due to ill health, Davison resigned his position as Mayor of Calgary but kept his seat in the Legislature until his term was over.

Davison attempted to enter federal politics in 1935, contesting the Bow River district for the House of Commons of Canada in the 1935 Canadian federal election as the Conservative candidate. He was defeated by Social Credit candidate Charles Edward Johnston.

Davison ran for the Legislative Assembly of Alberta in the 1940 Alberta general election in the Calgary district as the leader of the Independent Movement, which sought to unite the opposition to Social Credit. He was elected and then re-elected in 1944 Alberta general election. He continued to serve as both mayor and a member in the Legislature. He did not run again in 1948.

Following his resignation from the Alberta Legislature, Davison retired to Vancouver, where he died several years later on April 6, 1963, at the age of 76.

== Honours ==
The Andrew Davison Building, a 13-floor building at 133 6 Avenue SE and the former home of the Calgary Police Service headquarters, is named in his honour. There is also a Calgary Board of Education school named after him: Andrew Davison School.

Political offices
| Preceded by Frederick Ernest Osborne | Mayor of Calgary; 1930–1945 | Succeeded by James Cameron Watson |
Legislative Assembly of Alberta
| Preceded by Ernest Manning; John Irwin; Edith Gostick; John Hugill | MLA Calgary; 1940–1948 | Succeeded by Frederick Colborne; Hugh John MacDonald; James Mahaffy |
