= Fred Anderson (Canadian politician) =

Canadian politician (1878–1951)

Frederic Anderson
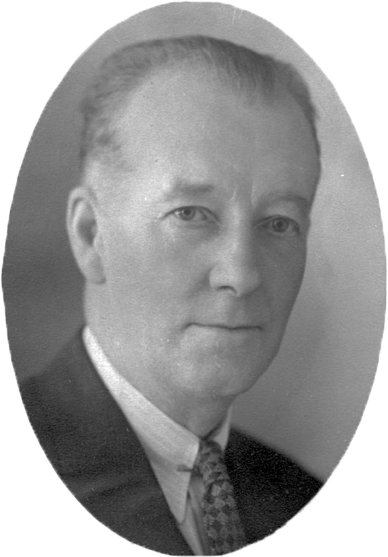

Member of the Legislative Assembly of Alberta
- In office August 22, 1935 – August 16, 1948
- Preceded by: Hugh Farthing; William Ross; Fred White; Norman Hindsley
- Succeeded by: Fred Colborne; Hugh John MacDonald
- Constituency: Calgary

Personal details
- Born: September 9, 1878 Adyar, South India
- Died: June 13, 1951 (aged 72) Calgary, Alberta
- Party: Social Credit
- Education: Haileybury College

Frederic Anderson (September 9, 1878 – June 13, 1951) was a provincial level politician from Alberta, Canada. He was elected to the Legislative Assembly of Alberta holding a seat in the Calgary electoral district from 1935 to 1948 as a member of the Social Credit caucus.

== Early life ==
Frederic Anderson was born on September 9, 1879, to Frederic Anderson and Rosamund Piers at Adyar, South India. Anderson was educated at Haileybury College in England, and was employed by the Bank of England for three years. Anderson would move to Canada in 1907 and homesteaded northwest of Medicine Hat. In 1914, he would enlist in the 28th battalion and served overseas in the First World War, ending his service as a major.

== Political career ==
Anderson ran for a seat in the Alberta Legislature in the 1935 Alberta general election. He ran as a Social Credit candidate in the electoral district of Calgary. He took the third seat on the 15th count to win his first term in office. Anderson ran for a second term in the 1940 Alberta general election. He won the 5th seat just barely hanging on to win re-election. Anderson was re-elected to his third and final term in the 1944 Alberta general election. He improved his showing by winning second place in the district. Anderson's health began to deteriorate in 1947, and he did not attend any sittings of the Legislature in 1948. Anderson did not seek re-election in 1948 and retired from politics at the dissolution of the legislature.

== Later life ==
Anderson died on June 13, 1951, in Colonel Belcher Hospital in Calgary after a long illness.
