= Rose Wilkinson =

Canadian politician

MLA for Calgary
- In office 1944–1959
- Preceded by: William Aberhart, John Bowlen, James Mahaffy
- Succeeded by: District abolished

MLA for Calgary North
- In office 1959–1963
- Preceded by: New District
- Succeeded by: Robert Simpson

Personal details
- Born: Rosamond Owens; March 19, 1885 County Cavan, Ireland
- Died: December 18, 1968 (aged 83) Edmonton, Alberta, Canada
- Party: Social Credit Party of Alberta
- Spouse: Frederick Wilkinson
- Children: 1

Rosamond Wilkinson (née Owens; March 19, 1885 – December 18, 1968) was a provincial and municipal level politician from Alberta, Canada. She served as Calgary city councillor 1936-1955 and as a member of the Legislative Assembly of Alberta from 1944 to 1963. She was born in County Cavan, Ireland.

== Political career ==
Wilkinson was first elected to public office as a Calgary city councillor in 1935. She would serve on council until 1955.

For some of this time, she also was a MLA.

Wilkinson ran as a Social Credit candidate in the Calgary provincial electoral district in the 1944 Alberta general election. She was the third most popular candidate in the city-wide district used at the time to elect Calgary's five MLAs. Although she did not get quota on the first count, she was elected on the 15th count, after votes were transferred as per the Single Transferable Vote system in use at the time.

Wilkinson ran in the 1948 Alberta general election and was elected on the First Count. She won a third term in office in the 1952 Alberta general election.

The 1955 Alberta general election saw Wilkinson lose significant support. She was the fifth most popular candidate in the first count, but did not take quota until the end. She eventually won the fourth of the six seats in Calgary. Her surplus votes were transferred to help fellow SC candidate Arthur Dixon win a seat as well. Liberal Grant MacEwan won the 5th seat. (In all, Calgary elected three SC MLAs, two Liberals and one Conservative in this PR-based election.) After this election, Calgary's city-wide electoral district was abolished in favor of single member districts, Single transferable voting was replaced by First Past The Post/single-member Plurality voting.

Wilkinson ran in the new electoral district of Calgary North in 1959. She received a majority of the votes and defeated two experienced opponents, former Members of the Legislative Assembly A.J.E. Liesemer and Grant MacEwan, (and Conservative candidate James Macdonald) to win another term in office.

She did not run for re-election in 1963 - she was 78 years old at the time.

Wilkinson died in Edmonton on December 18, 1968, after a stroke and was buried in the Holy Cross Cemetery in that same city.
