= Hugh John MacDonald (Calgary MLA) =

Canadian politician

Member of the Legislative Assembly of Alberta for Calgary
- In office August 17, 1948 – June 17, 1959
- Preceded by: Andrew Davison; Fred Anderson
- Succeeded by: District Abolished

Justice of the Court of Queen's Bench of Alberta
- In office March 25, 1968 – April 11, 1986

Personal details
- Born: April 11, 1911 Strathmore, Alberta
- Died: June 24, 1998 (aged 87)
- Party: Liberal
- Occupation: lawyer, jurist

Hugh John MacDonald (April 11, 1911 – June 24, 1998) was a provincial level politician and judge from Alberta, Canada. He served as a member of the Legislative Assembly of Alberta in the Liberal opposition from 1948 to 1959. He was later appointed to Court of Queen's Bench of Alberta, serving as a judge from 1968 to 1986.

== Early life ==
MacDonald was born on April 11, 1911, in Strathmore, Alberta. He attended Mount Royal College, and the Calgary Normal School, where he was qualified as a teacher. After teaching for four years, he attended the University of Alberta Faculty of Law, graduating with an LLB in 1938. He articled under J. Fred Scott and was called to the bar in 1939. MacDonald enlisted in the Royal Canadian Navy during the Second World War.

== Political career ==
MacDonald ran for a seat to the Legislative Assembly of Alberta for the first time in the 1948 Alberta general election. He ran as a Liberal candidate in the Calgary electoral district and won the fourth seat.

MacDonald ran for a second term in the 1952 Alberta general election. He won his second term in office taking the fifth seat in the vote. MacDonald ran for his third term and final term in office in the 1955 Alberta general election. He was re-elected improving his popularity to win the second seat. He would retire from the Legislature in 1959.

== Judicial career ==
After his political career, MacDonald practiced as a named partner at MacDonald, Cheesman, Moore, McMahon, and Tingle. He was appointed to the Supreme Court of Alberta, Trial Division on March 25, 1968. MacDonald took supernumerary status on April 11, 1982, and retired from the bench on April 11, 1986.
