= Howard MacDonald =

Canadian politician

Howard Burton MacDonald

MLA for Calgary
- In office 1944–1955
- Preceded by: James Mahaffy; William Aberhart; John Bowlen
- Succeeded by: Arthur Smith; Grant MacEwan

Personal details
- Born: July 18, 1885 Green Hill, Pictou County, Nova Scotia
- Died: October 29, 1960 (aged 75)
- Party: Independent; Social Credit

Howard Burton MacDonald was a provincial level politician from Alberta, Canada. He served as a member of the Legislative Assembly of Alberta from 1944 to 1955. He held a seat in the electoral district of Calgary as an Independent and later a member of Social Credit.

== Political career ==
MacDonald ran for a seat in the Alberta Legislature in the 1944 Alberta general election. He ran as an Independent candidate under the unity movement of opposition parties opposed to the Social Credit government. He placed fifth in the first count but when vote transfers under the Single Transferable Voting system in use he finished fourth, winning a seat in the 17th vote count.

MacDonald ran for re-election in the 1948 Alberta general election. He came in third in the first count, but without quota of votes needed to be elected under the Single Transferable Voting system in use, but eventually won enough votes to be elected. He was the only Unity Movement Independent MLA left.

He crossed the floor and joined the Social Credit government on March 1, 1952. His reason for crossing was due to his belief that the Social Credit Party formed the best private enterprise government in Canada. His departure marked the official end to the unity movement.

MacDonald ran for re-election in the 1952 Alberta general election as a Social Credit candidate. He was re-elected taking the second seat of Calgary's six seats in that election.

MacDonald ran for a fourth term in the 1955 Alberta general election but was defeated. He finished seventh place just short of the last seat.

He died five years later at the age of 75.
