= Frederick C. Colborne =

Canadian politician

Frederick Charles Colborne DFC

Member of the Legislative Assembly of Alberta
- In office August 8, 1944 – August 17, 1948
- Preceded by: New district
- Succeeded by: District abolished
- Constituency: Royal Canadian Air Force
- In office August 17, 1948 – June 18, 1959
- Preceded by: Fred Anderson; Andrew Davison
- Succeeded by: District abolished
- Constituency: Calgary
- In office June 18, 1959 – August 29, 1971
- Preceded by: New district
- Succeeded by: District abolished
- Constituency: Calgary Centre

Personal details
- Born: November 14, 1916
- Died: April 19, 2006 (aged 89)
- Party: Alberta Social Credit Party
- Military career
- Allegiance: Canada
- Branch: Royal Canadian Air Force
- Service years: 1940–Unknown
- Rank: Wing Commander
- Unit: No. 5 Squadron RCAF

Frederick C. Colborne (November 14, 1916 – April 19, 2006) D.F.C., of Calgary, Alberta, Canada, was soldier and a Canadian politician at municipal and provincial levels. He was elected to the Legislative Assembly of Alberta in 1944 and served until 1971. He first sat as a non-partisan MLA, then switched to the Social Credit party, for which he held a seat from 1948 to 1971. He also served on Calgary city council 1947–1948.

== Early life ==
Colborne served in the Royal Canadian Air Force in Newfoundland during the Second World War, though primarily stationed in Halifax. He flew convoy patrols over the North Atlantic in a 2 engine PBY-Canso water plane with a crew of 5-7, and equipped with machine guns, and armed with depth charges. He took part in 2 attacks on enemy submarines, damaging one and destroying the other. He received several medals and citations, ultimately earning a Distinguished Flying Cross.

== Political career ==
In 1944, seats in the Alberta Legislature were set aside for three members to represent members of the armed forces (army, navy, and air force). These three members did not represent a geographical district but instead spoke for the men and women serving overseas in the Second World War, one seat for each branch of the services. These three representatives had no political affiliation and sat on the opposition side of the House. Colborne was elected by 21 percent of the Air Force votes, to serve as the representative of the Air Force.

While serving as MLA, he also served on Calgary city council 1947–1948.

In 1948, with the armed forces seats abolished, Colborne joined the Alberta Social Credit Party and was elected in Calgary. He went on to serve in the Legislature until 1971. During his lengthy service as an MLA, he also became a member of Cabinet, serving initially as a Minister without Portfolio. In 1962, he became Minister of Public Works and then, in 1967, Minister of Municipal Affairs. He was defeated in Calgary Currie in the 1971 Alberta general election by Fred Peacock of the Progressive Conservatives. After his 1971 defeat, he did not try again to be elected.

Legislative Assembly of Alberta
Preceded by New Position	MLA Airforce; 1945–1948	Succeeded by District Abolished
Preceded by Andrew Davison; Fred Anderson	MLA Calgary; 1948–1959	Succeeded by District Abolished
Preceded by New District	MLA Calgary Centre; 1959–1971	Succeeded by District Abolished
