= Clayton Adams =

Clayton Adams may refer to:

- Clayton Adams (politician), member of the Legislative Assembly of Alberta
- Clayton Sinnott Adams, United States Army general

== See also ==
- Klayton Adams, American football coach
