= Norman B. James =

Canadian politician

Norman Bloomfield James
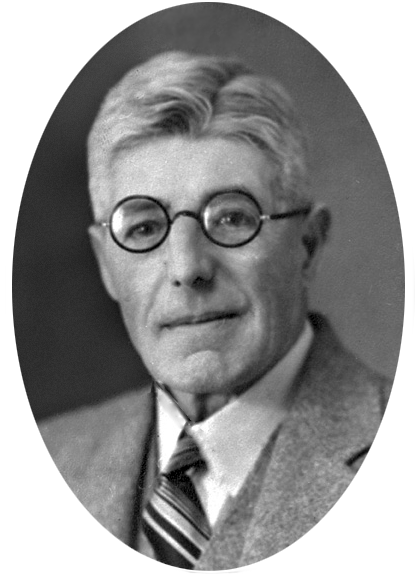

Member of the Legislative Assembly of Alberta
- In office August 22, 1935 – March 21, 1940
- Preceded by: Lorne Proudfoot
- Succeeded by: District Abolished
- Constituency: Acadia
- In office March 21, 1940 – August 17, 1948 Serving with David Duggan (1940-1942) Hugh John MacDonald (1940-1944) Ernest Manning (1940-1948) John Page Elmer Roper (1942-1948) William J. Williams (1944-1948)
- Preceded by: Samuel Barnes, Edward Gray, Walter Morrish, David Mullen and Gerald O'Connor
- Succeeded by: Clayton Adams, Lou Heard and James Prowse
- Constituency: Edmonton

Personal details
- Born: August 4, 1872 Wandsworth, England
- Died: December 12, 1963 (aged 91)
- Party: Social Credit

Norman Bloomfield James (August 4, 1872 – December 12, 1963) was a farmer and provincial politician from Alberta, Canada. He served as a member of the Legislative Assembly of Alberta from 1935 to 1948 sitting with the Social Credit caucus in government.

== Early life ==
Norman Bloomfield James was born on August 4, 1872, in Wandsworth, England. He attended post secondary education at Aberystwyth University. Bloomfield moved to Canada in 1893. He settled near Youngstown, Alberta and began farming.

== Political career ==
James ran for a seat to the Alberta Legislature as a Social Credit candidate in the electoral district of Acadia in the 1935 Alberta general election. He defeated incumbent Lorne Proudfoot and another candidate with a landslide majority to pick up the seat for his party.

The 1939 boundary redistribution saw the electoral district of Acadia merged with Coronation to form Acadia-Coronation. James decided to run for re-election in the electoral district of Edmonton in the 1940 Alberta general election. James was returned winning the third place seat out of five.

James ran for a third term in office in the 1944 Alberta general election. He barely hung onto his seat winning in the final vote count.

James retired from provincial politics at dissolution of the assembly in 1948.

He published "The Autobiography of a Nobody" in 1948.
