= James Harper Prowse =

Canadian politician

The Honourable James Harper Prowse Jr.

Canadian Senator from Alberta
- In office February 24, 1966 – September 27, 1976
- Constituency: Edmonton, Alberta

Leader of the Opposition
- In office February 21, 1952 – April 15, 1958
- Preceded by: John Percy Page
- Succeeded by: Grant MacEwan

Leader of the Alberta Liberal Party
- In office June 26, 1947 – 1958
- Preceded by: Wesley Stambaugh
- Succeeded by: Grant MacEwan

Member of the Legislative Assembly of Alberta
- In office February 5, 1945 – August 17, 1948
- Preceded by: constituency established
- Succeeded by: constituency abolished
- Constituency: Army
- In office August 17, 1948 – June 18, 1959 Serving with Clayton Adams, Lou Heard, Elmer Roper, Ernest Manning, Harold Tanner, Edgar Gerhart, J. Donovan Ross and Abe Miller
- Preceded by: Norman James, John Page and William J. Williams
- Succeeded by: constituency abolished
- Constituency: Edmonton

Personal details
- Born: November 3, 1913 Taber, Alberta, Canada
- Died: September 27, 1976 (aged 62)
- Party: Alberta Liberal federal Liberal
- Other political affiliations: Independent
- Occupation: politician, lawyer and service man

Military service
- Allegiance: Canada
- Branch/service: Royal Canadian Army
- Years of service: 1940–1945
- Rank: Captain
- Battles/wars: World War II

James Harper Prowse Jr. (November 3, 1913 – September 27, 1976) was a politician, barrister and solicitor from Edmonton, Alberta, Canada. He served in the Legislative Assembly of Alberta from 1945 to 1959, first as an independent and then as a Liberal. As an Edmonton MLA, he led the Alberta Liberal Party from 1948 to 1958 and served as a senator from 1966 until his death in 1976.

== Early life ==
James Harper Prowse Jr. was born in Taber, Alberta, on November 3, 1913. He took his post-secondary education at the University of Alberta.

== World War II ==
Prowse enlisted in the Canadian Army in 1940. He served five years overseas during the Second World War, mostly in the Italian Campaign, and rose to the rank of captain. He was wounded twice during combat. His army career ended after he was elected to the Alberta Legislature in the 1945 service vote.

== Provincial and municipal politics ==
Prowse was introduced to politics at a young age when his father, James Harper Prowse Sr., ran as a Conservative in the 1926 provincial election in the electoral district of Taber.

Prowse first ran for a seat in the legislature in the 1944/1945 armed forces vote that was the last stage of the 1944 general election. He ran as a candidate for the army seat and on February 5, 1945 won the seat with just 17 percent of the vote, defeating 21 other candidates. The vote was non-partisan so Prowse sat as an independent in the legislature.

After winning the election and returning to Edmonton, Prowse worked as a journalist for the Edmonton Bulletin. He crossed the floor to the Liberals after announcing his intention to run for the leadership of the party on April 10, 1947. He said of his decision, "The political situation has reached a point where there is no longer any advantage to be gained by remaining neutral."

Prowse was elected leader of the party on the first ballot at the Liberals' annual convention on June 26, 1947. The convention was attended by 476 delegates. He defeated two other candidates, Jonathan Wheatly and Joseph Tremblay.

The armed forces seats were abolished after the Second World War, and were not be filled in the 1948 election. Prowse ran for a seat in the Edmonton electoral district in the 1948 Alberta election. He took the fourth of five seats in the multi-member district, the seats were allocated using the single transferable voting election system. With the use of proportional representation in Alberta's two largest cities, the Liberal party received 17 percent of the popular vote province-wide and won one seat in Edmonton, one in Calgary, and none in the districts where instant-runoff voting was used.

In the 1952 Alberta general election Prowse won one of the seven seats in the Edmonton electoral district. He led the Liberals to four seats and 22% of the popular vote.

In the 1955 general election the Liberals made their best showing in decades, winning 15 seats and earning 31 percent of the popular vote. Prowse again took the second seat in Edmonton.

Prowse stepped down as leader of the Liberal party in 1958 and retired from the legislature at dissolution in 1959. He did not run in the 1959 provincial election.

He ran for mayor of Edmonton in the 1959 municipal election; he lost to Elmer Roper.

== Federal politics ==
Prowse first ran for a seat to the House of Commons of Canada in the 1962 federal election in the electoral district of Edmonton West as a candidate for the Liberal Party of Canada. He finished a close second to incumbent Marcel Lambert and ahead of former Social Credit Member of Parliament Orvis Kennedy.

The minority parliament was dissolved less than a year later and so came the 1963 federal election. Prowse ran again in Edmonton West but still finished behind Lambert.

Prowse was appointed to the Senate of Canada on the advice of Prime Minister Lester Pearson in 1967. He represented Alberta there until his death on September 27, 1976.
