= John Percy Page =

Canadian politician

The Honourable John Percy Page
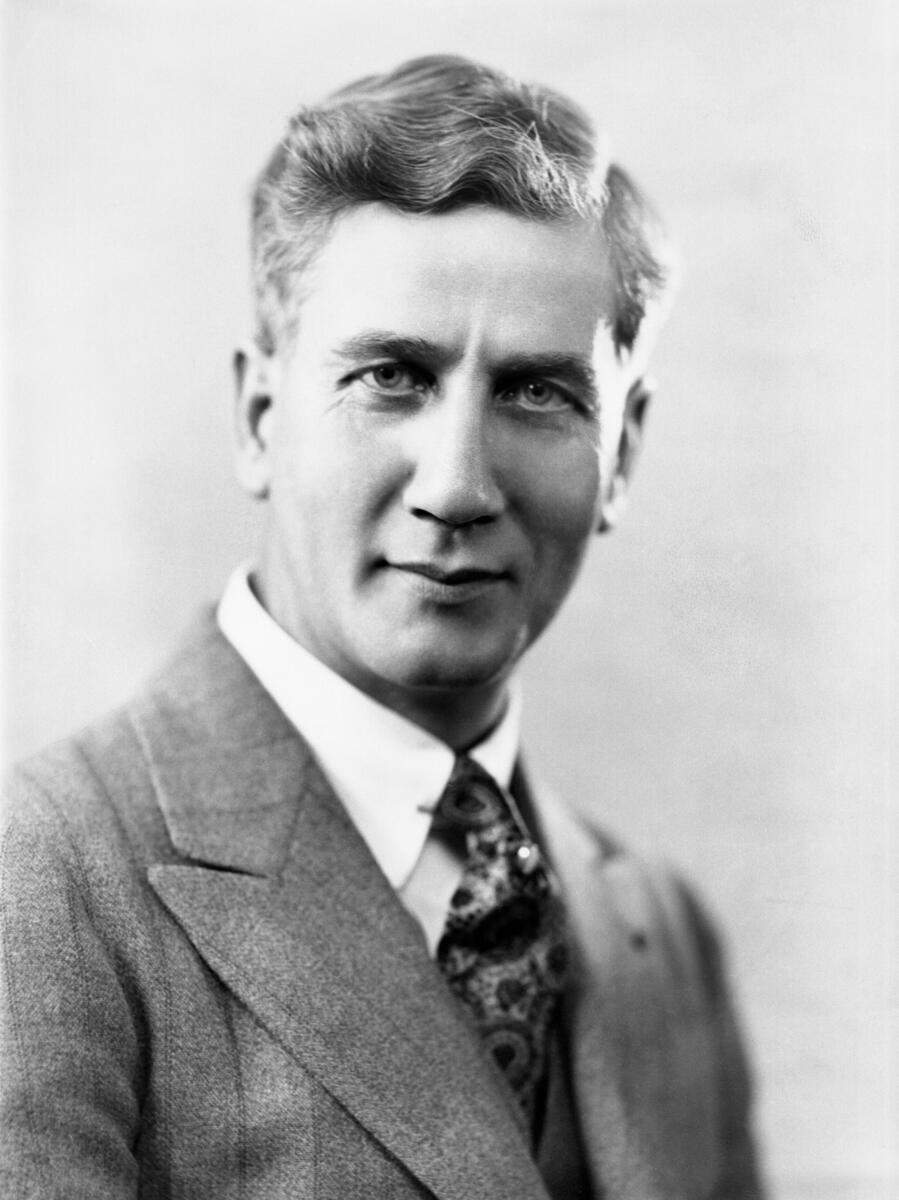

8th Lieutenant Governor of Alberta
- In office December 19, 1959 – January 6, 1966
- Monarch: Elizabeth II
- Governor General: Georges Vanier
- Premier: Ernest Manning
- Preceded by: John J. Bowlen
- Succeeded by: Grant MacEwan

Leader of the Opposition
- In office February 22, 1945 – August 17, 1948
- Preceded by: James H. Walker
- Succeeded by: 4-year vacancy (next James Harper Prowse)

Member of the Legislative Assembly of Alberta for Edmonton
- In office March 21, 1940 – June 18, 1959 Serving with Ernest Manning, Norman B. James, David Milwyn Duggan, Hugh J. Macdonald, Elmer Roper, William J. Williams, Lou Heard, James Harper Prowse, Clayton Adams, Joseph Donovan Ross, Edgar Gerhart, Harold E. Tanner
- Preceded by: William R. Howson; Samuel A. Barnes; George Van Allen; David Milwyn Duggan; David B. Mullen; Gerald O'Connor
- Succeeded by: district abolished

Personal details
- Born: May 14, 1887 Rochester, New York, U.S.
- Died: March 2, 1973 (aged 85) Edmonton, Alberta, Canada
- Party: Independent Citizen's Association (until 1952); Progressive Conservative (from 1952)
- Spouse: Maude Roche (m. 1910)
- Children: 1
- Education: Normal School; Queen's University
- Occupation: teacher, basketball coach, politician

John Percy Page (May 14, 1887 – March 2, 1973) was a Canadian teacher, basketball coach, provincial politician, and the eighth Lieutenant Governor of Alberta.

== Early life and education ==
Born in Rochester, New York, the son of Absalom Bell Page and Elizabeth Thomas, he moved with his family in 1890 to Bronte, Ontario. He attended Oakville Junior High School, Hamilton Collegiate Institute, Ontario Normal School, and Queen's University. He received a Bachelor of Arts degree from Queen's University, and a Bachelor of Commercial Science degree from the American Institute of Business.

In 1906, he accepted a teaching position at Rothesay Collegiate in Rothesay, New Brunswick. In 1907, he switched to the St. Thomas Collegiate Institute where he taught until 1912.

In 1910 J. Percy Page married Maude Roche, daughter of Gilbert Roche, of St. Thomas, Ontario. They had one daughter: Patricia Hollingsworth.

In 1912 Percy took a position in Edmonton, Alberta to introduce commercial training into the Edmonton high school system. Before retiring from teaching in 1952, he would be a Principal at two Edmonton high schools.

== Coaches Edmonton Grads ==
While at the McDougall Commercial High School in 1914-15 he was the coach of the senior girls' basketball team. He continued to coach the same girls after graduation on a team that became known as The Edmonton Grads. The team under his tutorship would become one of the most successful teams of all time in sport, winning 502 of 522 games, for a winning percentage of .961, and winning all 27 Olympic matches they played in the Olympics in 1924, 1928, 1932 and 1936. However, women's basketball was not an official Olympic sport until 1976. In 1955, he was inducted into Canada's Sports Hall of Fame as a basketball builder.

== Political career ==
In the 1940 Alberta election, he was elected to the Legislative Assembly of Alberta in the Edmonton electoral district as a member of the Independent Citizen's Association, an anti-Social-Credit alliance of Conservatives, Liberals and others, of which he was a leading member.

He was re-elected in 1944. From 1945 to 1948, he was the Leader of the Opposition.

He was defeated in 1948, but was elected in 1952 as a Progressive Conservative. In 1952, he was appointed House Leader for the Progressive Conservatives. He was re-elected in 1955. He lost re-election in 1959.

From 1957 to 1959, he was also a trustee of the Edmonton Public School Board.

In 1959, he was appointed Lieutenant Governor of Alberta and served until 1966.

== Honours ==
In 1961, he was made a Knight of Grace of the Most Venerable Order of the Hospital of St. John of Jerusalem. In 1961, he was awarded an Honorary Doctor of Laws degree from the University of Alberta. The J. Percy Page School in Edmonton is named in his honour.
