= 1955 Alberta general election =

- June 29, 1955

61 seats in the Legislative Assembly of Alberta 31 seats were needed for a majority
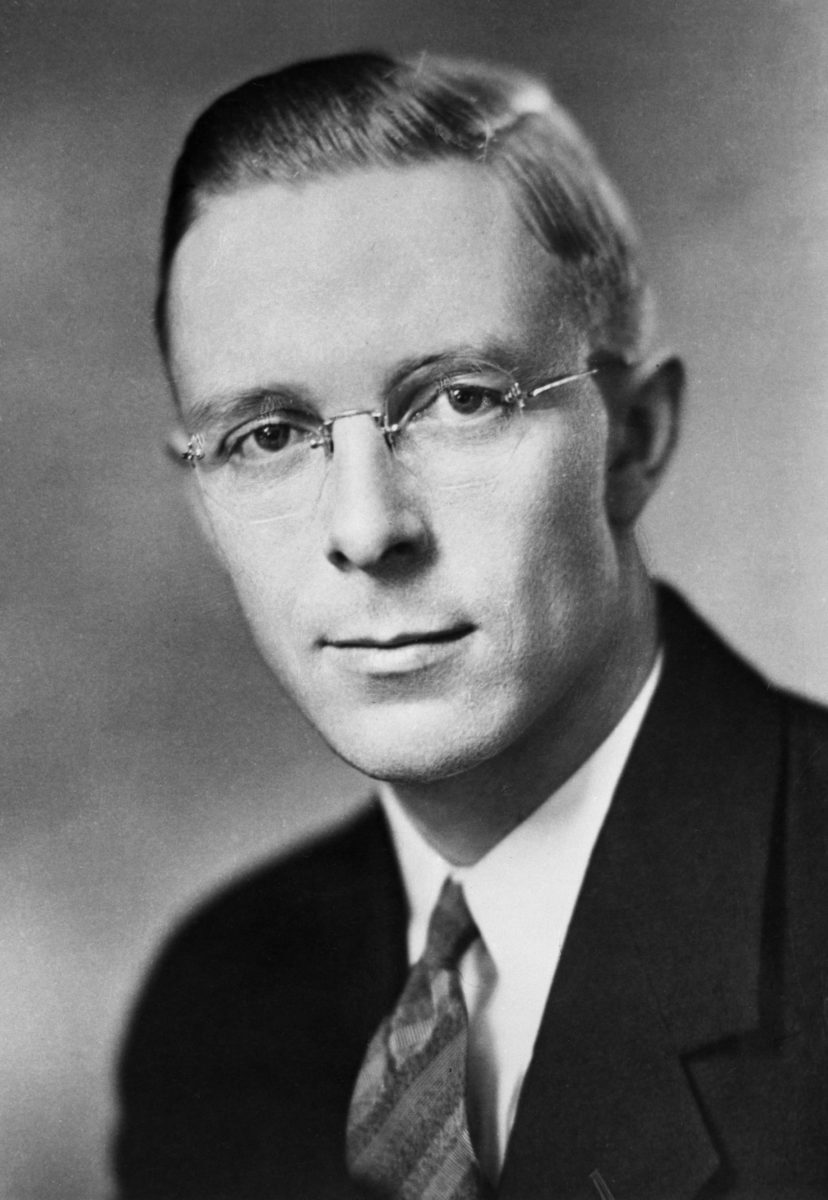

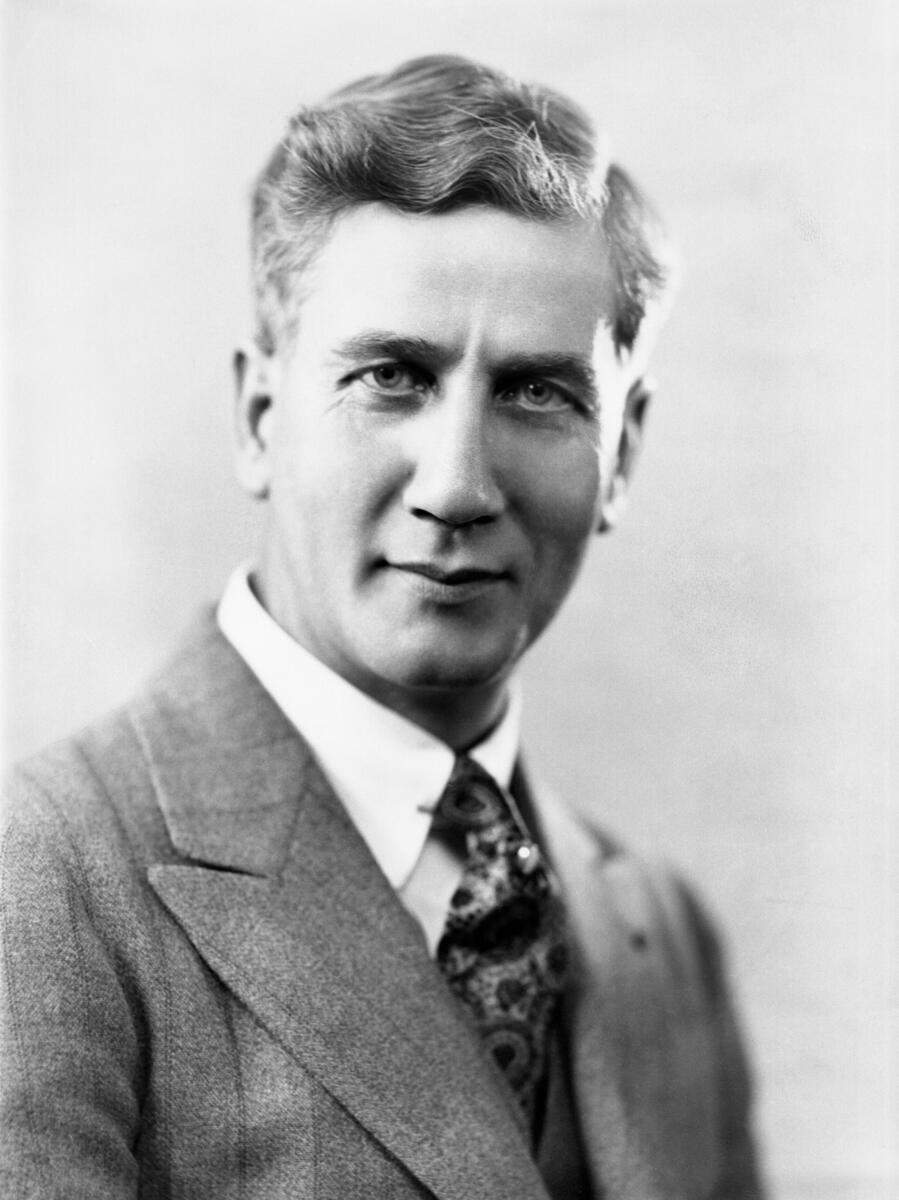

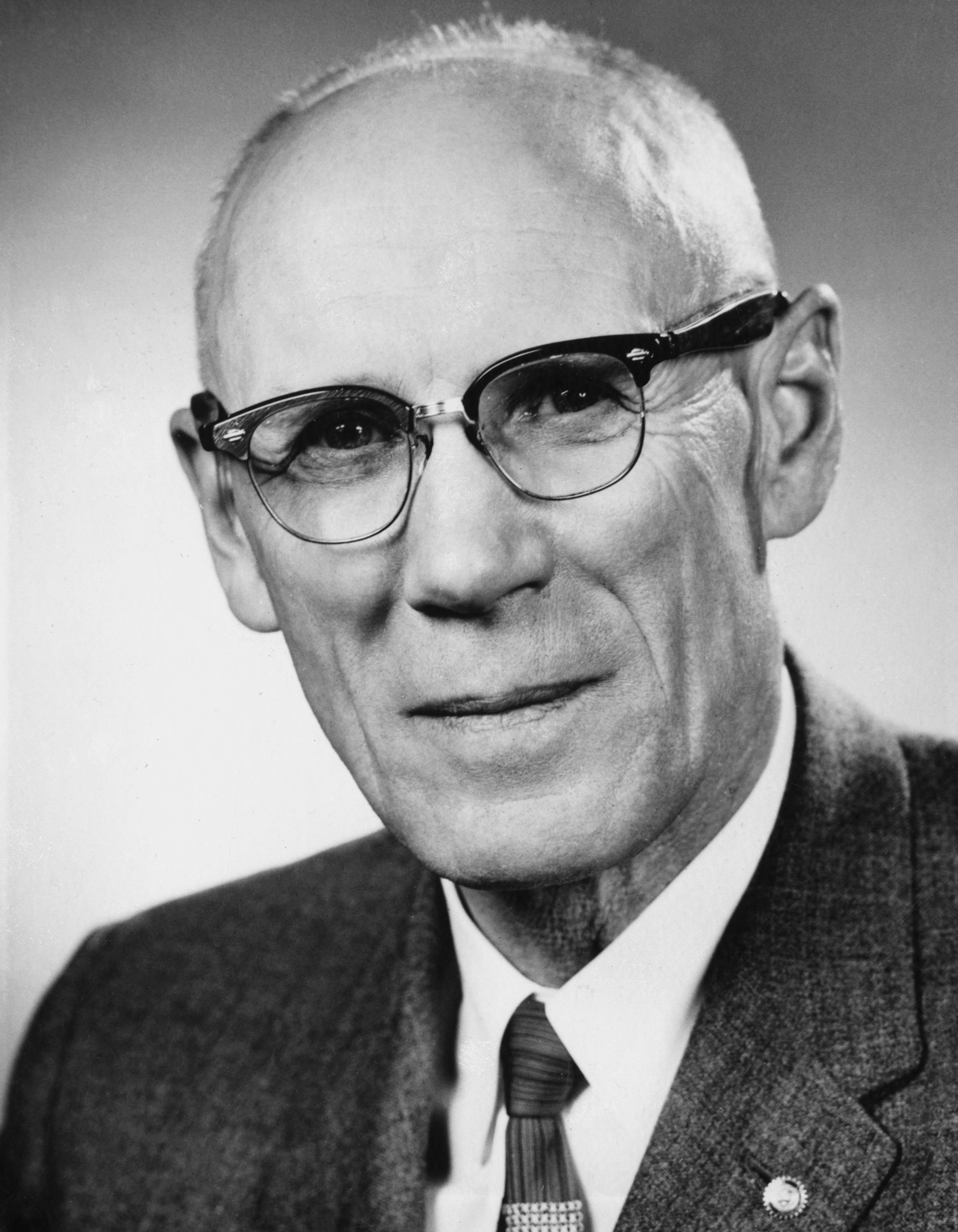
	Majority party	Minority party
		LIB
Leader	Ernest Manning	James H. Prowse
Party	Social Credit	Liberal
Leader since	May 31, 1943	June 25, 1947
Leader's seat	Edmonton	Edmonton
Last election	53 seats, 56.2%	3 seats, 22.4%
Seats before	53	3
Seats won	37	15
Seat change	▼16	▲12
Popular vote	175,553	117,741
Percentage	46.4%	31.1%
Swing	▼9.8%	▲8.7%
	Third party	Fourth party
Leader	John P. Page	Elmer E. Roper
Party	Conservative	Co-operative Commonwealth
Leader since	1952	1942
Leader's seat	Edmonton	Edmonton (lost re-election)
Last election	2 seats, 3.7%	1 seats, 14.1%
Seats before	2	2
Seats won	3	2
Seat change	▲1	±0
Popular vote	34,757	31,180
Percentage	9.2%	8.2%
Swing	▲5.5%	▼5.9%
Premier before election
Ernest Manning
Social Credit
Premier after election
Ernest Manning
Social Credit

The 1955 Alberta general election was held on June 29, 1955, to elect members of the Legislative Assembly of Alberta.

Despite losing almost 10% of the popular vote (compared to its 1952 proportion of the vote) and 30% of its seats in the legislature, the Social Credit Party, led by Ernest C. Manning, received a slightly higher number of votes than in 1952 and won a comfortable majority for its sixth term in government.

The Liberal Party emerged as the principal opposition to the Social Credit juggernaut, winning over 30% of the popular vote, and increasing its legislative caucus from 4 members to 15. The Cooperative Commonwealth Federation won two seats. However its leader, MLA Elmer Roper, was defeated, ending his thirteen-year career in the legislature. Three Conservative Party candidates and various independents also won seats.

This provincial election, like the previous seven, saw district-level proportional representation (Single transferable voting) used to elect the MLAs of Edmonton and Calgary. City-wide districts were used to elect multiple MLAs in the cities. All the other MLAs were elected in single-member districts through Instant-runoff voting. This was the last provincial election to use PR. After this the electoral system was changed to Plurality voting.

The rise in opposition MLAs was only partially created in the cities where single transferable voting was in use. Only one more opposition MLA was elected in the cities versus the number elected there in 1952. Calgary elected two Liberals in 1955 versus one in 1952. The addition of seven Liberal MLAs was produced by the rise in Liberal Party popularity. This was a sign of dis-satisfaction with the SC government which by that point in time had been in power 20 years.

A portion of the increased opposition caucus were four Liberal MLAs who were elected in rural districts through vote transfers conducted under instant-runoff voting despite the Social Credit candidate in each of the districts being the leader in the First Count. The election of these four caused the government to abandon the STV/AV system that had been in use since 1924. After the system's replacement by single-member Plurality voting and various other reforms put into effect by Premier Manning, the SC government would take many more seats in subsequent elections.

Voter turnout in this election was 68 per cent.

== Snap vote ==
The 1955 election was brought on after Liberal leader James Harper Prowse questioned the confidence of the government in question period regarding members of the Social Credit caucus who had had dealings with the Alberta Treasury Branch. Manning was angered by the question and had the Lieutenant Governor dissolve the assembly despite having two more years left in his term.

== Expulsion ==
On the last day of the campaign Ernest Manning barred candidates Roy Lee and John Landeryou from running as official Social Credit candidates. However, due to the ballots having already been printed, the two men were still listed under the Social Credit name. Lee and Landeryou had violated the Legislative Assembly Act by renting a building to the provincial government.

== End of STV and AV ==
Following this election, the Social Credit government did away with the Alternative Vote Instant-runoff voting system, that had been in place in the rural constituencies, and the PR through Single Transferable Vote system in Edmonton and Calgary, both of which had been in place since 1924.

Under Single Transferable Voting, results would take up to five days to count the necessary vote transfers, before the last member was declared elected. This was especially problematic, in Edmonton that elected seven members. The resulting representation was very well balanced, with as many as four parties commonly elected in each major city.

As well, the government in 1955 had lost four local elections in rural constituencies due to vote transfers held under IRV, when its candidate had received the largest portion of the vote in the first round but was not elected to the seat after re-distribution of the ballots in later counts. The cancellation of the IRV system was meant to prevent this in the future. In four constituencies the SC candidate had received plurality of first-choice votes but was not elected when another candidate surpassed his lead through vote transfers conducted under IRV. This indicated to the government that the supporters of the opposition parties were beginning to support each other in a joint effort to defeat the government. (One historian has stated that there were 20 constituencies like this in which the SC at the end won only five but that number is too high. There were 16 constituencies in which, in the first count, no candidate took the majority of the votes. Only in these constituencies was it necessary to hold more counts (involving re-distribution of some votes in accordance with voters' marked back-up preferences). Even where vote transfers were conducted and more counts held, mostly the candidate leading in the first round won the seat in the end, but there were four constituencies (Acadia-Coronation, Athabasca, Lac Ste. Anne and Vermilion) in which the leading candidate in the first round was not the candidate with the most votes at the end and thus did not win the seat. The victim in all four cases was a SC candidate.)

The government presented the complicated voting procedure as reason to shift to First past the post, a voting system that was simpler but also was expected to give the government more seats. The 1955 election saw the election of the largest opposition caucus that Manning faced during his 25 years as premier (although it was just 40 per cent of the seats in the Legislature). As well, it was the most opposition members Social Credit would face during its 36 years in power.

After the shift to First past the post the next election (1959) saw the government win all but four of the seats in the Legislature, far more than its due share of the vote.

== Results ==
Elections to the 13th Alberta Legislative Assembly (1955)
Party	Leader	Candidates	First-preference votes				Seats		
Party	Leader	Candidates	Votes	±	% Fpv	Change (pp)	1952	1955	±
Social Credit	Ernest C. Manning	62	175,553	7,764▲	46.42	-9.82	53	37 / 61	16▼
Liberal	James H. Prowse	53	117,741	75,812▲	31.13	8.76	3	15 / 61	12▲
Conservative (Note: Compared to 1952 Conservative/PC total)	John P. Page	26	34,757	23,786▲	9.19	5.52	2	3 / 61	1▲
Co-operative Commonwealth	Elmer Roper	38	31,180	10,749▼	8.24	-5.81	2	2 / 61	Steady
Independent Social Credit		3	2,721	1,482▼	0.72	-0.69	1	1 / 61	Steady
Coalition	Frank Gainer	2	4,581	4,581▲	1.21	1.21	–	1 / 61	1▲
Independent		7	4,225	3,520▼	1.12	0.88	–	1 / 61	1▲
Liberal–Conservative	Ross Ellis	2	4,001	4,001▲	1.06	1.06	–	1 / 61	1▲
Labor-Progressive		9	3,420	2,288▲	0.90	0.43			
Total		202	378,179		100.00%				
Rejected ballots			22,839	2,226▲					
Turnout			401,018	82,070▲	68.0%	8.6▲			
Registered voters			589,409	52,239▲					

== MLAs elected ==
Acadia-Coronation: James Sims
Alexandra: Anders Aalborg
Athabasca: Richard Hall
Banff-Cochrane: Frank Gainer
Bonnyville: Jake Josvanger
Bow Valley-Empress: Bryce Stringam (Ind)
Bruce: Earl Hardy
Calgary: Frederick C. Colborne
Calgary: Arthur Dixon
Calgary: Hugh John MacDonald
Calgary: Grant MacEwan
Calgary: Arthur Ryan Smith
Calgary: Rose Wilkinson
Camrose: Chester Sayers
Cardston: Edgar Hinman
Clover Bar: Floyd Baker
Cypress: Harry Strom
Didsbury: James Lawrence Owens
Drumheller: Gordon Taylor
Edmonton: Edgar Gerhart
Edmonton: Ernest Manning
Edmonton: Abe Miller
Edmonton: John Page
Edmonton: James Harper Prowse
Edmonton: Joseph Donovan Ross
Edmonton: Harold Tanner
Edson: Norman Willmore
Gleichen: George E. Bell
Grande Prairie: Ira McLaughlin
Grouard: Joseph Desfosses
Hand Hills: Wallace Warren Cross
Lac La Biche: Michael Maccagno
Lac Ste. Anne: John Mills
Lacombe: Allen Patrick
Leduc: Ronald Ansley (I-SC)
Lethbridge: John Landeryou
Little Bow: Peter Dawson
Macleod: James Hartley
Medicine Hat: Elizabeth Robinson
Okotoks-High River: Ross Ellis (L-C)
Olds: Frederick Niddrie
Peace River: William Gilliland
Pembina: Robin Jorgenson
Pincher Creek-Crowsnest: William Kovach
Ponoka: Glen Johnston
Red Deer: Cam Kirby
Redwater: Alfred Macyk
Rocky Mountain House: Alfred Hooke
St. Albert: Arthur Soetaert
St. Paul: Raymond Reierson
Sedgewick: Jack Hillman
Spirit River: Adolph Fimrite
Stettler: John Clark
Stony Plain: John McLaughlin
Taber: Roy S. Lee
Vegreville: Stanley Ruzycki
Vermilion: Russell Whitson
Wainwright: Henry Ruste
Warner: Leonard Halmrast
Wetaskiwin: John Wingblade
Willingdon: Nick Dushenski

=== Synopsis of results ===
Results by riding – 1955 Alberta general election (all except Calgary, Edmonton and servicemember MLAs)
Riding	First-preference votes										Turnout (Note: including spoilt ballots)	Final counts					Winning party	
Name	SC	Lib	Con	CCF	I-SC	Coal	L-C	LPP	Ind	Total	Turnout	SC	Lib	Con	CCF	I-SC	1952	1955
Acadia-Coronation	2,026	1,932	–	607	–	–	–	–	–	4,565	83.6%	2,122	2,263	–	–	–	SC	Lib
Alexandra	2,143	1,420	101	590	–	–	–	–	–	4,254	67.4%	Elected on 1st count					SC	SC
Athabasca	2,073	2,069	–	–	–	–	–	293	–	4,435	71.8%	2,097	2,145	–	–	–	SC	Lib
Banff-Cochrane	1,926	–	–	–	–	2,342	–	–	–	4,268	70.7%	Elected on 1st count					SC	Coal
Bonnyville	1,331	2,250	–	–	788	–	–	–	–	4,369	74.3%	Elected on 1st count					SC	Lib
Bow Valley-Empress	2,330	–	–	–	–	–	–	–	2,569	4,899	74.5%	Elected on 1st count					SC	Ind
Bruce	1,978	1,525	70	998	–	–	–	–	–	4,571	74.2%	2,105	2,033	–	–	–	SC	SC
Camrose	2,899	2,214	217	734	–	–	–	–	–	6,064	72.2%	3,081	2,758	–	–	–	SC	SC
Cardston	1,813	985	–	–	–	–	–	–	–	2,798	61.8%	Elected on 1st count					SC	SC
Clover Bar	2,314	1,609	331	603	–	–	–	–	–	4,857	70.6%	2,505	2,158	–	–	–	SC	SC
Cypress	2,668	1,205	–	–	–	–	–	–	–	3,873	71.7%	Elected on 1st count					SC	SC
Didsbury	2,601	–	–	–	–	2,239	–	–	–	4,840	72.3%	Elected on 1st count					SC	SC
Drumheller	3,224	995	–	–	–	–	–	183	–	4,402	67.4%	Elected on 1st count					SC	SC
Edson	2,529	2,146	192	–	–	–	–	–	–	4,867	70.7%	Elected on 1st count					SC	SC
Gleichen	1,912	1,784	–	–	–	–	–	–	–	3,696	74.6%	Elected on 1st count					SC	SC
Grande Prairie	3,240	1,481	377	538	–	–	–	–	–	5,636	70.8%	Elected on 1st count					SC	SC
Grouard	2,319	2,855	–	571	–	–	–	–	–	5,745	67.5%	2,425	3,026	–	–	–	Lib	Lib
Hand Hills	2,685	1,666	–	–	–	–	–	–	282	4,633	81.7%	Elected on 1st count					SC	SC
Lac La Biche	1,868	1,931	–	–	–	–	–	–	–	3,799	74.0%	Elected on 1st count					SC	Lib
Lac Ste. Anne	1,965	1,684	–	1,374	–	–	–	–	–	5,023	76.6%	2,120	2,592	–	–	–	SC	Lib
Lacombe	2,255	–	1,579	602	–	–	–	–	–	4,436	72.5%	Elected on 1st count					SC	SC
Leduc	950	963	394	1,147	1,338	–	–	–	–	4,792	68.2%	–	1,871	–	–	2,035	I-SC	I-SC
Lethbridge	4,788	3,361	883	490	–	–	–	–	–	9,522	63.6%	Elected on 1st count					SC	SC
Little Bow	2,481	1,359	510	–	–	–	–	–	–	4,350	75.2%	Elected on 1st count					SC	SC
Macleod	3,037	1,946	–	–	–	–	–	–	–	4,983	66.3%	Elected on 1st count					SC	SC
Medicine Hat	5,066	1,862	–	605	–	–	–	–	–	7,533	61.7%	Elected on 1st count					SC	SC
Okotoks-High River	2,482	–	–	–	–	–	2,607	–	–	5,089	77.3%	Elected on 1st count					SC	L-C
Olds	3,161	2,238	–	–	–	–	–	–	–	5,399	74.7%	Elected on 1st count					SC	SC
Peace River	3,456	2,184	–	780	–	–	–	–	–	6,420	63.2%	Elected on 1st count					SC	SC
Pembina	2,609	1,708	–	840	–	–	–	–	–	5,157	72.9%	Elected on 1st count					SC	SC
Pincher Creek-Crowsnest	2,799	–	–	–	–	–	1,394	363	–	4,556	73.2%	Elected on 1st count					SC	SC
Ponoka	2,254	1,323	184	698	–	–	–	–	130	4,589	71.3%	2,320	1,417	–	751	–	SC	SC
Red Deer	4,170	–	4,381	637	–	–	–	–	–	9,188	70.2%	4,286	–	4,786	–	–	SC	Con
Redwater	1,632	1,878	–	552	–	–	–	270	–	4,332	72.5%	1,739	2,214	–	–	–	SC	Lib
Rocky Mountain House	2,829	1,200	–	417	–	–	–	–	–	4,446	68.6%	Elected on 1st count					SC	SC
St. Albert	2,509	2,618	159	–	–	–	–	–	646	5,932	79.6%	2,610	3,029	–	–	–	SC	Lib
St. Paul	2,761	2,049	–	–	–	–	–	415	–	5,225	76.4%	Elected on 1st count					SC	SC
Sedgewick	2,748	1,450	–	483	–	–	–	–	–	4,681	71.7%	Elected on 1st count					SC	SC
Spirit River	2,369	1,306	–	950	–	–	–	–	–	4,625	73.1%	Elected on 1st count					SC	SC
Stettler	2,892	–	1,523	726	–	–	–	–	–	5,141	74.6%	Elected on 1st count					SC	SC
Stony Plain	1,788	2,865	–	758	–	–	–	–	–	5,411	71.4%	Elected on 1st count					SC	Lib
Taber	2,788	1,186	–	–	595	–	–	–	–	4,569	68.0%	Elected on 1st count					SC	SC
Vegreville	1,887	1,126	–	1,953	–	–	–	–	–	4,966	81.0%	2,197	–	–	2,374	–	SC	CCF
Vermilion	2,018	1,728	–	684	–	–	–	307	–	4,737	75.4%	2,111	2,131	–	–	–	SC	Lib
Wainwright	2,657	1,537	–	570	–	–	–	63	–	4,827	72.0%	Elected on 1st count					SC	SC
Warner	1,917	1,178	–	–	–	–	–	–	–	3,095	55.8%	Elected on 1st count					SC	SC
Wetaskiwin	2,695	1,636	258	892	–	–	–	–	–	5,481	72.3%	2,756	1,731	–	942	–	SC	SC
Willingdon	1,580	756	–	1,729	–	–	–	–	–	4,065	75.5%	1,701	–	–	2,108	–	CCF	CCF

= Open seat
= turnout is above provincial average
= Candidate was in previous Legislature
= Incumbent had switched allegiance
= Previously incumbent in another riding
= Not incumbent; was previously elected to the Legislature
= Incumbency arose from by-election gain
= previously an MP in the House of Commons of Canada
= Multiple candidates

=== Multi-member districts ===
District	Seats won (in order declared)
Calgary	
Edmonton	

Social Credit
Liberal
Conservative (in Edmonton); Progressive Conservative (in Calgary)

= Candidate was in previous Legislature
= First-time MLA

== STV analysis ==
=== Exhausted votes ===
Eighteen districts went beyond first-preference counts in order to determine winning candidates:

Exhausted votes (1955)
District	Counts		Exhausted	
District	1st preference	Final	Votes	% of 1st pref
Calgary	62,494	59,366	3,128	5.01
Edmonton	76,544	74,367	2,177	2.84
Acadia-Coronation	4,565	4,385	180	3.94
Athabasca	4,435	4,242	193	4.35
Bruce	4,571	4,138	433	9.47
Camrose	6,064	5,839	225	3.71
Clover Bar	4,857	4,663	194	3.99
Grouard	5,745	5,461	284	4.94
Lac Ste. Anne	5,023	4,712	311	6.19
Leduc	4,792	3,906	886	18.49
Ponoka	4,589	4,488	101	2.20
Red Deer	9,188	9,072	116	1.26
Redwater	4,332	3,953	379	8.75
St. Albert	5,932	5,639	293	4.94
Vegreville	4,966	4,571	395	7.95
Vermilion	4,737	4,242	495	10.45
Wetaskiwin	5,481	5,429	52	0.95
Willingdon	4,065	3,809	256	6.30

=== Calgary ===
Social Credit fielded more candidates than available seats. Liberals had a full slate, while the Conservatives and CCF, focusing on potential votes only, chose to have fewer candidates.

Party	Candidates			MLAs elected		
Party	1955	1952	±	1955	1952	±
Social Credit	7	6	1▲	3	4	1▼
Liberal	6	6	Steady	2	1	1▲
Conservative	4	5	1▼	1	1	Steady
Co-operative Commonwealth	4	6	2▼	–	–	Steady
Labor-Progressive	1	–	1▲	–	–	–
Independent	1	–	1▲	–	–	–
Labour	–	1	1▼	–	–	–
Independent Labour	–	1	1▼	–	–	–
Total	23	25	2▼	6	5	1▲

Reports of count-by-count results are incomplete, skipping rounds 10, 11 and 13–17. The following includes only the winning candidates plus those others going beyond the 17th round:

Calgary (1952 Alberta general election) (analysis of transferred votes, candidates ranked in order of 1st preference)
Party	Candidate	Maximum round	Maximum votes	Share in maximum round	Maximum votes First round votes Transfer votes
PC	Arthur Ryan Smith	1	9,726	15.59%	
Liberal	Hugh John MacDonald	12	9,298	15.02%	
Social Credit	Frederick C. Colborne	19	9,602	16.17%	
PC	Paul Brecken	21	7,618	12.83%	
Social Credit	Rose Wilkinson	20	8,979	15.12%	
Social Credit	Arthur J. Dixon	21	7,698	12.97%	
Social Credit	Howard B. Macdonald	18	5,668	9.48%	
Liberal	Grant MacEwan	21	8,338	14.05%	
Exhausted votes			3,128	5.01%	

=== Edmonton ===
All major parties ran full slates. There were also two Labour candidates

Party	Candidates			MLAs elected		
Party	1952	1948	±	1952	1948	±
Social Credit	7	7	Steady	3	3	Steady
Liberal	7	7	Steady	3	2	1▲
Conservative	7	7	Steady	1	1	Steady
Co-operative Commonwealth	7	7	Steady	–	1	1▼
Labor-Progressive	1	1	Steady	–	–	–
Independent	1	–	1▲	–	–	–
Total	30	29	1▲	7	7	Steady

Edmonton (1955 Alberta general election) (seven members elected, candidates ranked in order of 1st preference)
Party	Candidate	FPv%	Count																										
Party	Candidate	FPv%	1	2	3	4	5	6	7	8	9	10	11	12	13	14	15	16	17	18	19	20	21	22	23	24	25	26	27
Social Credit	Ernest Manning	30.33%	23,216																										
Liberal	James Harper Prowse	24.50%	18,755	18,755																									
Co-operative Commonwealth	Elmer Roper	5.81%	4,444	4,628	4,985	5,018	5,048	5,052	5,119	5,127	5,208	5,221	5,378	5,398	5,836	5,850	6,145	6,161	6,171	7,460	7,468	7,530	7,611	7,635	7,708	7,856	8,097	8,125	8,263
Conservative	John Percy Page	5.34%	4,086	4,446	4,998	5,015	5,017	5,050	5,056	5,136	5,142	5,429	5,446	5,561	5,575	5,731	5,753	5,791	5,806	5,833	5,863	7,352	7,465	7,523	7,743	7,888	8,565	8,676	9,224
Liberal	Edgar Bailey	3.88%	2,971	3,136	4,724	4,732	4,735	4,751	4,761	4,781	4,784	4,796	4,805	4,820	4,825	4,859	4,869	5,021	5,026	5,068	5,079	5,125	5,368	5,398	6,369	6,446			
Liberal	Andre Dechene	3.76%	2,877	2,937	3,696	3,696	3,696	3,707	3,708	3,709	3,713	3,716	3,741	3,746	3,750	3,978	3,990	4,168	4,174	4,190	4,194	4,228	4,922	4,985					
Liberal	Abe William Miller	3.64%	2,787	2,976	4,634	4,642	4,642	4,647	4,650	4,659	4,665	4,692	4,701	4,724	4,741	4,788	4,807	5,107	5,118	5,140	5,155	5,323	6,185	6,242	7,998	8,199	10,674		
Social Credit	Anthony Hlynka	2.48%	1,896	3,289	3,311	3,313	3,314	3,314	3,317	3,320	3,324	3,326	3,330	3,337	3,343	3,350	3,381	3,390	3,455	3,466	3,686	3,706	3,728	5,295	5,503				
Liberal	J. Laurier Payment	2.14%	1,640	1,700	2,843	2,859	2,859	2,861	2,863	2,866	2,869	2,880	2,883	2,892	2,898	2,962	2,976	3,062	3,067	3,087	3,094	3,124							
Liberal	Harold Tanner	2.10%	1,604	1,677	4,144	4,161	4,164	4,171	4,175	4,211	4,215	4,231	4,243	4,247	4,250	4,286	4,306	4,430	4,437	4,448	4,455	4,522	5,464	5,490	6,746	6,891	9,496	10,445	
Social Credit	Joseph Donovan Ross	2.06%	1,575	5,632	5,662	5,672	5,673	5,674	5,678	5,690	5,695	5,705	5,711	5,722	5,733	5,744	5,746	5,752	5,944	5,951	6,195	6,236	6,275	7,078	7,166	9,319	9,437	9,447	9,483
Social Credit	Edgar Gerhart	1.72%	1,320	5,179	5,192	5,193	5,194	5,197	5,201	5,203	5,213	5,218	5,225	5,231	5,231	5,249	5,259	5,268	5,510	5,522	5,884	5,908	5,927	6,717	6,887	8,973	9,099	9,106	9,121
Conservative	Gifford Main	1.39%	1,064	1,137	1,203	1,204	1,204	1,227	1,228	1,252	1,255	1,317	1,321	1,682	1,709	1,975	1,992	2,014	2,021	2,037	2,052								
Labor-Progressive	William Harasym	1.24%	947	956	960	962	963	965	965	966	969	971	977	979	983	986													
Co-operative Commonwealth	Robert Atkin	1.23%	940	956	965	965	983	984	1,146	1,148	1,212	1,213	1,318	1,319	1,455	1,466	1,608	1,617	1,618										
Social Credit	William J.M. Henning	1.03%	785	2,246	2,253	2,257	2,258	2,258	2,258	2,262	2,264	2,266	2,268	2,272	2,278	2,285	2,290	2,294	2,494	2,502	3,483	3,502	3,519						
Conservative	Gerard Amerongen	0.90%	692	726	759	760	763	785	791	879	879	890	893	933	937														
Social Credit	Cyril G. Havard	0.79%	602	1,346	1,349	1,352	1,353	1,354	1,354	1,355	1,356	1,361	1,362	1,365	1,367	1,369	1,378	1,386	1,941	1,946									
Social Credit	Mrs. C.N. Hattersley	0.73%	555	1,306	1,306	1,307	1,308	1,312	1,314	1,316	1,318	1,320	1,326	1,332	1,332	1,336	1,354	1,379											
Liberal	Lois Grant	0.72%	552	570	928	930	932	935	937	948	957	960	970	974	978	988	1,019												
Conservative	Robert F. Lambert	0.72%	548	566	584	586	586	647	647	659	661	675	677																
Co-operative Commonwealth	Floyd Johnson	0.60%	458	475	478	479	484	484	495	497	596	598	708	713															
Conservative	Frederick John Mitchell	0.53%	405	449	476	482	483	491	491	502	502																		
Co-operative Commonwealth	Mary Crawford	0.50%	383	398	403	405	412	423	452	456	521	522																	
Co-operative Commonwealth	Ivor Dent	0.43%	328	333	336	338	364	365	390	394																			
Conservative	Mrs. John A. L. Smith	0.39%	299	309	328	330	347	359	361																				
Co-operative Commonwealth	Arthur E. Thompson	0.38%	290	298	301	301	356	356																					
Conservative	Robert L. Brower	0.29%	221	228	238	238	239																						
Co-operative Commonwealth	Hubert M. Smith	0.23%	177	181	188	189																							
Independent	Charles E. Payne	0.17%	127	140	162																								
Exhausted ballots		—	—	0	0	20	29	37	49	70	88	99	123	159	185	204	533	566	624	756	798	850	942	1,043	1,286	1,834	2,038	2,038	2,177
Electorate: 127,069 Valid: 76,544 Spoilt: 6,248 Quota: 9,569 Turnout: 82,792 (65.2%)

Edmonton (1952 Alberta general election) (analysis of transferred votes, candidates ranked in order of 1st preference)
Party	Candidate	Maximum round	Maximum votes	Share in maximum round	Maximum votes First round votes Transfer votes
Social Credit	Ernest Manning	1	23,216	30.33%	
Liberal	James Harper Prowse	1	18,755	24.50%	
CCF	Elmer Roper	27	8,263	11.11%	
Conservative	John Percy Page	27	9,224	12.40%	
Liberal	Edgar Bailey	24	6,446	8.63%	
Liberal	Andre Dechene	22	4,985	6.60%	
Liberal	Abe William Miller	25	10,674	14.33%	
Social Credit	Anthony Hlynka	23	5,503	7.31%	
Liberal	J. Laurier Payment	20	3,124	4.13%	
Liberal	Harold Tanner	26	10,445	14.02%	
Social Credit	Joseph Donovan Ross	27	9,483	12.75%	
Social Credit	Edgar Gerhart	27	9,121	12.26%	
Conservative	Gifford Main	19	2,052	2.71%	
LPP	William Harasym	14	986	1.29%	
CCF	Robert Atkin	17	1,618	2.13%	
Social Credit	William J.M. Henning	21	3,519	4.65%	
Conservative	Gerard Amerongen	13	937	1.23%	
Social Credit	Cyril G. Havard	18	1,946	2.57%	
Social Credit	Mrs. C.N. Hattersley	16	1,379	1.81%	
Liberal	Lois Grant	15	1,019	1.34%	
Conservative	Robert F. Lambert	11	677	0.89%	
CCF	Floyd Johnson	12	713	0.93%	
Conservative	Frederick John Mitchell	9	502	0.66%	
CCF	Mary Crawford	10	522	0.68%	
CCF	Ivor Dent	8	394	0.52%	
Conservative	Mrs. John A. L. Smith	7	361	0.47%	
CCF	Arthur E. Thornton	6	356	0.47%	
Conservative	Robert L. Brower	5	239	0.31%	
CCF	Hubert M. Smith	4	189	0.25%	
Independent	Charles E. Payne	3	162	0.21%	
Exhausted votes			2,177	2.84%	

== See also ==
- List of Alberta political parties
