= General Adam =

General Adam may refer to:

- Abdikarim Yusuf Adam (died 2015), Somali National Army general
- Frederick Adam (1781–1853), British Army general
- Ronald Forbes Adam (1885–1982), British Army general
- Udi Adam (born 1958), Israel Defense Forces general
- Wilhelm Adam (general) (1877–1949), German Wehrmacht colonel general
- Wilhelm Adam (1893–1978), East German National People's Army major general
- Yekutiel Adam (1927–1982), Israel Defense Forces major general

== See also ==
- General Adams (disambiguation)
