= Attorney General Adams =

Attorney General Adams may refer to:

- Charles J. Adams (Vermont politician) (1917–2008), Attorney General of Vermont
- Paul L. Adams (Michigan judge) (1908–1990), Attorney General of Michigan
- William Henry Adams (1809–1865), Attorney General of Hong Kong

== See also ==
- General Adams (disambiguation)
