= General Adams =

General Adams may refer to:

- Alexander Adams (British Army officer) (1772–1834), British Army lieutenant general
- Carroll Edward Adams (1923–1970), American brigadier general
- Charles J. Adams (U.S. Air Force general) (1921–2002), U.S. Air Force brigadier general
- Chris Adams (general) (born 1930), U.S. Air Force major general
- Clayton Sinnott Adams (1881–1965), U.S. Army adjutant general and brigadier general
- Daniel Weisiger Adams (1821–1872), Confederate States Army brigadier general
- Emory Sherwood Adams (1881–1967), U.S. Army adjutant general and major general
- Jimmie V. Adams (born 1936), U.S. Air Force four-star general
- John Adams (Canadian general) (born 1942), Canadian Armed Forces major general
- John Adams (Confederate Army officer) (1825–1864), Confederate States Army brigadier general
- John Worthington Adams (1764–1837), British Army major general
- Paul D. Adams (1906–1987), U.S. Army general
- Ricky G. Adams (fl. 1980s–2010s), U.S. Army National Guard major general
- Robert Bellew Adams (1856–1928), British Indian Army major general
- Thomas Adams (British Army officer) (c. 1730–1764), British Army major posthumously promoted to brigadier-general
- William Wirt Adams (1819–1888), Confederate States Army brigadier general

== See also ==
- Clara Leach Adams-Ender (born 1939), U.S. Army brigadier general
- Attorney General Adams (disambiguation)
