= Clayton Adams (politician) =

Canadian politician

Member of the Legislative Assembly of Alberta
- In office August 17, 1948 – August 5, 1952 Serving with Lou Heard, James Prowse Ernest Manning and Elmer Roper
- Preceded by: Norman James John Page and William J. Williams
- Succeeded by: Edgar Gerhart, John Page, Joseph Ross and Harold Tanner
- Constituency: Edmonton

Personal details
- Born: January 9, 1882 Summerside, Prince Edward Island
- Died: November 23, 1963 (aged 81)
- Party: Social Credit
- Occupation: politician

Clayton Adams (January 9, 1882 – November 23, 1963) was a provincial politician from Alberta, Canada. He served as a member of the Legislative Assembly of Alberta from 1948 to 1952 with the Social Credit caucus in government.

== Political life ==
Adams ran for a seat to the Alberta Legislature in the electoral district of Edmonton as a Social Credit candidate in the 1948 Alberta general election. He won the second place seat to earn is first term in office. Adams did not run again at dissolution of the Legislature in 1952.

Adams died on November 23, 1963, at the age of 81.
