= 1948 Alberta general election =

- August 17, 1948

57 seats in the Legislative Assembly of Alberta 29 seats were needed for a majority
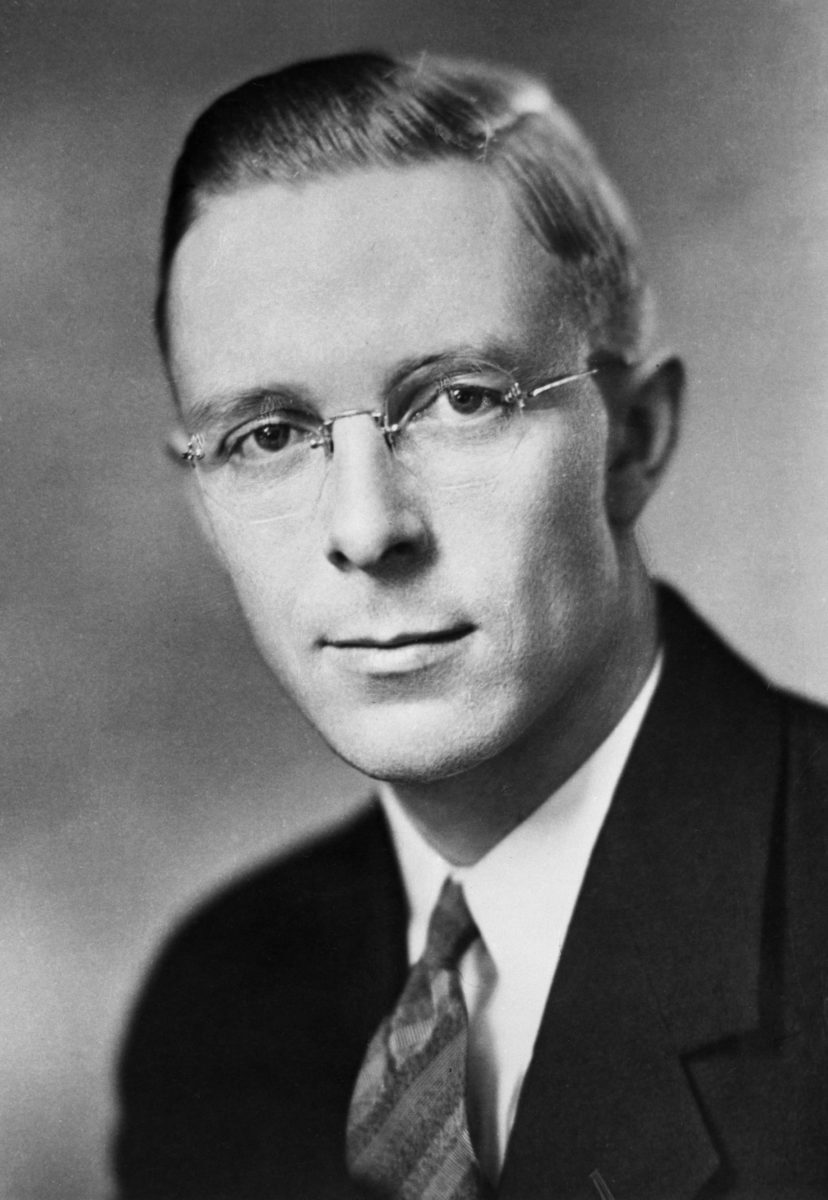

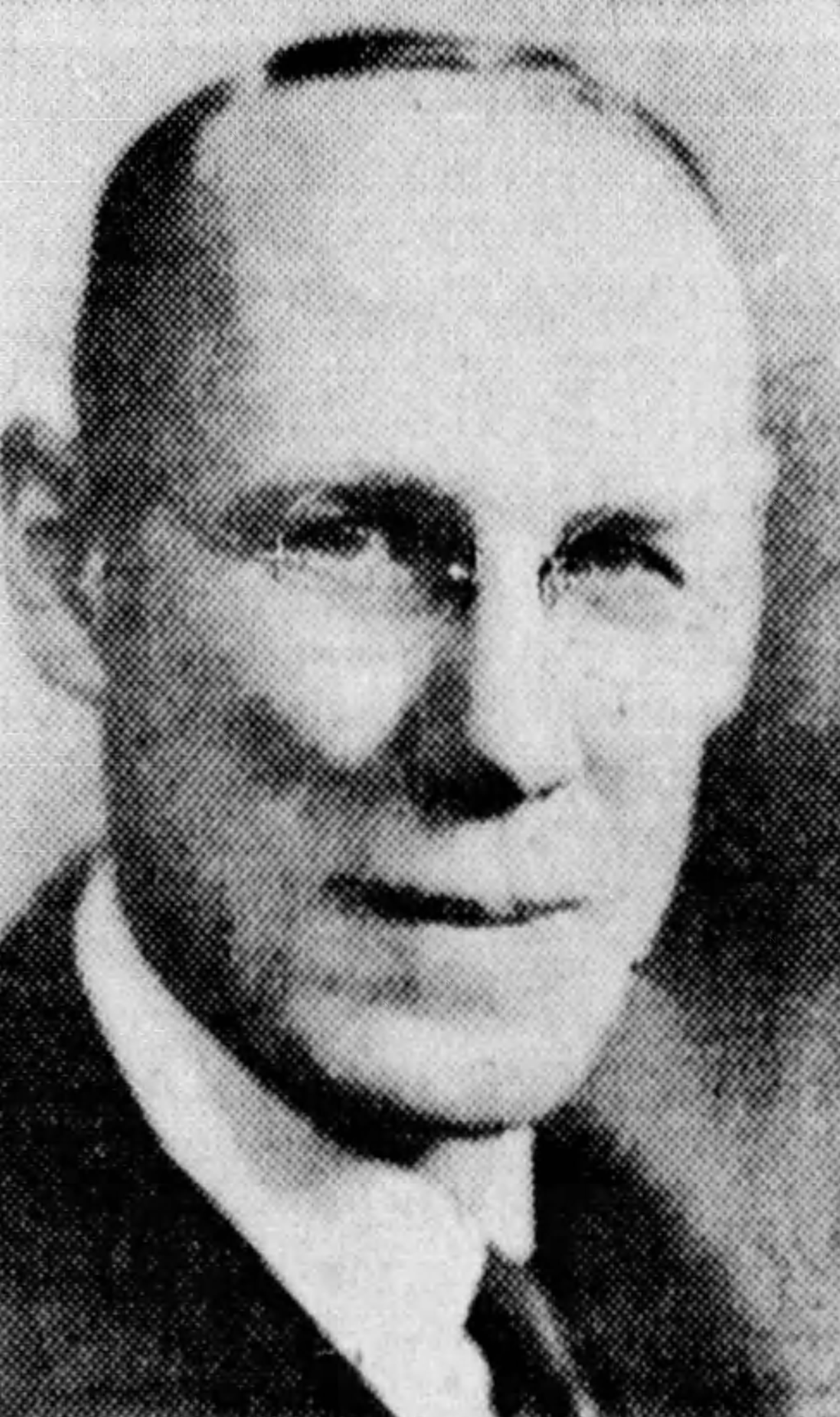
	Majority party	Minority party	Third party
			LIB
Leader	Ernest Manning	Elmer E. Roper	James H. Prowse
Party	Social Credit	Co-operative Commonwealth	Liberal
Leader since	May 31, 1943	1942	June 26, 1947
Leader's seat	Edmonton	Edmonton	Edmonton
Last election	51 seats, 50.5%	2 seats, 24.2%	did not run
Seats before	50	2	1
Seats won	51	2	2
Seat change	▲1	±0	▲1
Popular vote	164,003	56,387	52,655
Percentage	55.6%	19.1%	17.9%
Swing	▲5.1%	▼5.1%	—
Premier before election
Ernest Manning
Social Credit
Premier after election
Ernest Manning
Social Credit

The 1948 Alberta general election was held on August 17, 1948, to elect members of the Legislative Assembly of Alberta.

Ernest C. Manning led the Social Credit to a fourth term in government, increasing its share of the popular vote further above the 50% mark it had set in the 1944 election. It won the same number of seats — 51 of the 57 seats in the legislature — that it had won in the previous election.

The remaining seats were won by the Cooperative Commonwealth Federation, the Liberal Party and independents.

This provincial election, like the previous five, saw district-level proportional representation (Single transferable voting) used to elect the MLAs of Edmonton and Calgary. City-wide districts were used to elect multiple MLAs in the cities. All the other MLAs were elected in single-member districts through Instant-runoff voting.

Along with this election, voters got to also vote in a province wide plebiscite. The ballot asked voters about their preferred method to distribute electricity in province.

== Results ==
Elections to the 11th Alberta Legislative Assembly (1948)
Party	Leader	Candidates	First-preference votes				Seats		
Party	Leader	Candidates	Votes	±	% Fpv	Change (pp)	1944	1948	±
Social Credit	Ernest C. Manning	57	164,003	17,636▲	55.63	5.17	51	51 / 57	Steady
Co-operative Commonwealth	Elmer Roper	51	56,387	13,920▼	19.13	-5.11	2	2 / 57	Steady
Liberal	James H. Prowse	49	52,655	52,655▲	17.86	17.86	–	2 / 57	2▲
Independent Citizen's Association (Note: Formerly known as the Independent Movement or the Citizens' Slate)	John P. Page	9	12,983	34,256▼	4.40	-11.88	3	1 / 57	2▼
Independent Social Credit		3	2,958	2,958▲	1.00	1.00	–	1 / 57	1▲
Veteran's & Active Force		Did not campaign				-1.22	1	0 / 57	1▼
Labour		1	3,579	3,579▲	1.21	1.21			
Labor-Progressive	Ben Swankey	2	1,372	10,631▼	0.47	-3.67			
United Labour		1	856	932▼	0.30	-0.32			
Total		173	294,793		100.00%				
Rejected ballots			17,707	9,625▲					
Turnout			312,500	14,327▲	63.5%	7.2▼			
Registered voters			489,311	67,810▲					

== Electrification plebiscite ==
The fourth plebiscite conducted province-wide in Alberta's history, the 1948 electrification referendum was not a traditional yes–no question but presented two options on electricity generation and transmission. It asked the voter to indicate whether the province should create "a publicly-owned utility administered by the Alberta Government Power Commission" or leave the electricity industry in the hands of companies already in the business, a mixture of municipal operations and private companies. The driving force behind the referendum was whether to provide rural electrification through provincial government ownership or leave it in the hands of private corporations, who had done very little up to that time and did not have the financial resources to perform the task. The referendum result was a slight majority in favour of retention of the existing companies. Despite that, the government sponsored the creation of many Rural Electrification Associations, some of which still are in operation today.

The result shows how evenly divided the province was on the issue, with a majority of only 151 votes in favour of leaving the old system in place. In fact, voters in Edmonton were effectively split and the rural areas were in favour of provincial control, but an even larger majority in Calgary voted to retain the old system.

Option A	Option B
Are you in favour of the generation and distribution of electricity being continued by the Power Companies?	Are you in favour of the generation and distribution of electricity being made a publicly owned utility administered by the Alberta Government Power Commission?

Results by district – 1948 Alberta electricity plebiscite
District	In favour of			
District	Status quo		Public utility	
Acadia-Coronation	1,578	38.81%	2,487	61.19%
Alexandra	1,350	37.00%	2,298	63.00%
Athabasca	1,262	29.08%	3,077	70.92%
Banff-Cochrane	2,624	64.31%	1,456	35.69%
Beaver River	2,770	65.85%	1,436	34.15%
Bow Valley-Empress	1,737	47.02%	1,957	52.98%
Bruce	1,423	38.01%	2,320	61.99%
Calgary	26,325	69.63%	11,478	30.37%
Camrose	2,164	42.79%	2,893	57.21%
Cardston	1,268	46.00%	1,488	54.00%
Clover Bar	1,722	38.26%	2,778	61.74%
Cypress	1,279	47.49%	1,414	52.51%
Didsbury	2,360	60.00%	1,573	40.00%
Drumheller	1,862	47.58%	2,051	52.42%
Edmonton	22,351	50.99%	21,478	49.01%
Edson	1,623	33.86%	3,170	66.14%
Gleichen	2,007	56.04%	1,574	43.96%
Grande Prairie	2,293	49.55%	2,334	50.45%
Grouard	1,673	32.21%	3,520	67.79%
Hand Hills	1,759	44.95%	2,154	55.05%
Lac Ste. Anne	1,242	28.86%	3,061	71.14%
Lacombe	1,994	43.32%	2,608	56.68%
Leduc	1,899	44.02%	2,414	55.98%
Lethbridge	4,237	64.90%	2,291	35.10%
Little Bow	1,653	52.14%	1,517	47.86%
Macleod	2,179	53.74%	1,875	46.26%
Medicine Hat	5,186	81.03%	1,214	18.97%
Okotoks-High River	3,321	61.16%	2,109	38.84%
Olds	2,398	58.60%	1,694	41.40%
Peace River	1,914	42.90%	2,547	57.10%
Pembina	1,710	34.29%	3,276	65.71%
Pincher Creek-Crowsnest	1,838	44.59%	2,284	55.41%
Ponoka	1,622	41.69%	2,268	58.31%
Red Deer	2,963	52.79%	2,649	47.21%
Redwater	804	22.66%	2,743	77.31%
Rocky Mountain House	2,210	45.63%	2,633	54.37%
St. Albert	1,897	55.16%	2,333	44.84%
St. Paul	1,945	41.50%	2,741	58.50%
Sedgewick	1,962	48.17%	2,111	51.83%
Spirit River	1,147	31.91%	2,447	68.09%
Stettler	2,190	53.91%	1,872	46.09%
Stony Plain	1,360	35.88%	2,430	64.12%
Taber	1,485	46.46%	1,711	53.54%
Vegreville	1,225	32.08%	2,593	67.92%
Vermilion	1,732	43.12%	2,284	56.88%
Wainwright	1,813	41.00%	2,608	59.00%
Warner	1,265	51.33%	1,199	48.67%
Wetaskiwin	2,301	46.23%	2,676	53.77%
Willingdon	1,069	28.24%	2,716	71.76%
Totals	139,991	50.03%	139,840	49.47%

== MLAs elected ==
Acadia-Coronation: Clarence Gerhart
Alexandra: Anders Aalborg
Athabasca: Gordon Lee
Banff-Cochrane: Arthur Wray (I-SC)
Beaver River: Harry Lobay
Bow Valley-Empress: Wilson Cain
Bruce: Earl Hardy
Calgary: Frederick C. Colborne
Calgary: Aylmer Liesemer
Calgary: Howard MacDonald
Calgary: Hugh John MacDonald
Calgary: Rose Wilkinson
Camrose: Chester Sayers
Cardston: Nathan Eldon Tanner
Clover Bar: Floyd Baker
Cypress: James Underdahl
Didsbury: Howard Hammell
Drumheller: Gordon Taylor
Edmonton: Clayton Adams

Edmonton: Lou Heard
Edmonton: Ernest Manning
Edmonton: James Harper Prowse
Edmonton: Elmer Roper
Edson: Norman Willmore
Gleichen: George E. Bell
Grande Prairie: Ira McLaughlin
Grouard: John Wood
Hand Hills: Wallace Warren Cross
Lac Ste. Anne: Albert Bourcier
Lacombe: Duncan MacMillan
Leduc: Ronald Ansley
Lethbridge: John Landeryou
Little Bow: Peter Dawson
Macleod: James Hartley
Medicine Hat: John Lyle Robinson
Okotoks-High River: Ivan Casey
Olds: Norman E. Cook
Peace River: William Gilliland

Pembina: Robin Jorgenson
Pincher Creek-Crowsnest: William Kovach
Ponoka: Ora B. Moore
Red Deer: David Ure
Redwater: Peter Chaba
Rocky Mountain House: Alfred Hooke
St. Albert: Lucien Maynard
St. Paul: Joseph Beaudry
Sedgewick: Albert Fee
Spirit River: Henry DeBolt
Stettler: William S. Mackie
Stony Plain: Cornelia Wood
Taber: Roy S. Lee
Vegreville: Michael Ponich
Vermilion: William Cornish
Wainwright: William Masson
Warner: Leonard Halmrast
Wetaskiwin: John Wingblade
Willingdon: William Tomyn

=== Synopsis of results ===
Results by riding – 1948 Alberta general election (all except Calgary, Edmonton and servicemember MLAs)
Riding	First-preference votes						Turnout (Note: including spoilt ballots)	Final counts					Winning party	
Name	SC	CCF	Lib	ICA	Oth	Total	Turnout	SC	CCF	Lib	ICA	I-SC	1944	1948
Acadia-Coronation	2,332	641	1,254	–	–	4,227	78.5%	Elected on 1st count					SC	SC
Alexandra	2,034	1,190	651	–	–	3,875	57.7%	Elected on 1st count					SC	SC
Athabasca	2,374	1,226	958	–	–	4,558	59.0%	Elected on 1st count					SC	SC
Banff-Cochrane	1,084	–	–	1,246	1,658	3,988	58.2%	–	–	–	1,465	1,964	SC	I-SC
Beaver River	1,992	1,282	1,579	–	–	4,853	68.9%	2,117	–	1,698	–	–	SC	SC
Bow Valley-Empress	2,178	683	1,063	–	–	3,924	68.9%	Elected on 1st count					SC	SC
Bruce	2,248	1,080	615	–	–	3,943	64.0%	Elected on 1st count					SC	SC
Camrose	3,041	1,315	1,003	–	–	5,359	71.2%	Elected on 1st count					SC	SC
Cardston	1,981	–	944	–	–	2,925	60.00%	Elected on 1st count					SC	SC
Clover Bar	2,801	1,035	761	–	–	4,597	70.1%	Elected on 1st count					SC	SC
Cypress	1,723	410	844	–	–	2,977	69.2%	Elected on 1st count					SC	SC
Didsbury	2,647	417	–	935	–	3,999	64.5%	Elected on 1st count					SC	SC
Drumheller	2,982	–	271	–	856	4,109	76.4%	Elected on 1st count					SC	SC
Edson	2,543	1,715	770	–	–	5,028	65.4%	Elected on 1st count					SC	SC
Gleichen	2,354	–	–	1,303	–	3,657	65.4%	Elected on 1st count					SC	SC
Grande Prairie	2,952	1,019	768	–	–	4,739	68.4%	Elected on 1st count					SC	SC
Grouard	2,493	1,249	1,850	–	–	5,592	75.7%	2,717	–	1,917	–	–	SC	SC
Hand Hills	2,773	–	1,607	–	–	4,380	78.9%	Elected on 1st count					SC	SC
Lac Ste. Anne	1,899	1,558	1,023	–	39	4,519	69.7%	2,401	1,742	–	–	–	SC	SC
Lacombe	3,053	1,109	643	–	–	4,805	70.8%	Elected on 1st count					SC	SC
Leduc	2,548	1,071	772	–	–	4,391	61.2%	Elected on 1st count					SC	SC
Lethbridge	3,829	1,441	1,768	–	–	7,038	65.0%	Elected on 1st count					SC	SC
Little Bow	1,865	435	–	1,086	–	3,386	75.1%	Elected on 1st count					SC	SC
Macleod	2,852	756	612	–	–	4,220	67.8%	Elected on 1st count					SC	SC
Medicine Hat	3,835	996	1,043	–	–	5,874	64.0%	Elected on 1st count					SC	SC
Okotoks-High River	3,876	490	1,219	–	–	5,585	62.5%	Elected on 1st count					SC	SC
Olds	3,260	424	690	–	–	4,374	66.8%	Elected on 1st count					SC	SC
Peace River	3,191	1,087	829	–	–	5,107	61.3%	Elected on 1st count					SC	SC
Pembina	3,165	1,462	684	–	–	5,311	72.8%	Elected on 1st count					SC	SC
Pincher Creek-Crowsnest	2,210	815	998	–	856	4,879	72.0%	2,292	–	1,045	–	–	SC	SC
Ponoka	2,679	1,023	519	–	–	4,221	69.6%	Elected on 1st count					SC	SC
Red Deer	4,771	1,082	–	–	–	5,853	66.0%	Elected on 1st count					SC	SC
Redwater	1,807	1,528	441	–	–	3,776	66.9%	1,912	1,572	–	–	–	SC	SC
Rocky Mountain House	3,582	1,365	–	–	–	4,947	63.4%	Elected on 1st count					SC	SC
St. Albert	2,702	1,047	774	–	–	4,523	67.9%	Elected on 1st count					SC	SC
St. Paul	2,197	1,510	1,416	–	–	5,123	73.3%	2,980	1,584	–	–	–	SC	SC
Sedgewick	2,867	567	838	–	–	4,272	71.6%	Elected on 1st count					SC	SC
Spirit River	2,155	1,194	631	–	–	3,980	68.9%	Elected on 1st count					SC	SC
Stettler	3,249	953	–	–	–	4,201	67.8%	Elected on 1st count					SC	SC
Stony Plain	2,188	1,037	872	–	–	4,097	68.9%	Elected on 1st count					SC	SC
Taber	2,559	501	463	–	–	3,523	62.6%	Elected on 1st count					SC	SC
Vegreville	2,101	1,276	763	–	–	4,140	70.1%	Elected on 1st count					SC	SC
Vermilion	1,999	1,158	1,179	–	–	4,336	71.9%	2,196	–	1,323	–	–	SC	SC
Wainwright	2,877	887	833	–	–	4,597	70.4%	Elected on 1st count					SC	SC
Warner	1,691	–	598	–	–	2,289	53.6%	Elected on 1st count					SC	SC
Wetaskiwin	2,827	1,232	1,414	–	–	5,473	75.8%	Elected on 1st count					SC	SC
Willingdon	2,111	1,861	–	–	–	3,972	72.6%	Elected on 1st count					SC	SC

= Open seat
= turnout is above provincial average
= Candidate was in previous Legislature
= Incumbent had switched allegiance
= Previously incumbent in another riding
= Not incumbent; was previously elected to the Legislature
= Incumbency arose from by-election gain
= previously an MP in the House of Commons of Canada
= Multiple candidates

=== Multi-member districts ===
District	Seats won (in order declared)
Calgary	
Edmonton	

Social Credit
CCF
Liberal
Independent Citizen's Association

= Candidate was in previous Legislature
= First-time MLA

== STV analysis ==
=== Exhausted votes ===
Ten districts went beyond first-preference counts in order to determine winning candidates:

Exhausted votes (1948)
District	Counts		Exhausted	
District	1st preference	Final	Votes	% of 1st pref
Calgary	39,101	36,865	2236	5.72
Edmonton	46,150	44,256	1,894	4.10
Banff-Cochrane	3,988	3,429	559	14.02
Beaver River	4,853	3,815	1,038	21.39
Grouard	5,592	4,634	958	17.13
Lac Ste. Anne	4,519	4,143	376	8.32
Pincher Creek-Crowsnest	4,879	3,337	1,542	31.60
Redwater	3,776	3,484	292	7.73
St. Paul	5,123	4,564	559	10.91
Vermilion	4,336	3,519	817	18.84

=== Calgary ===
All parties other than the Independent Movement fielded full slates.

Party	Candidates			MLAs elected		
Party	1944	1940	±	1944	1940	±
Social Credit	5	5	Steady	2	2	Steady
Co-operative Commonwealth	5	5	Steady	1	1	Steady
Liberal	5	–	5▲	1	–	1▲
Independent Citizen's Association	3	4	1▼	1	2	1▼
Labor-Progressive	1	5	4▼	–	–	–
Labour	1	–	1▲	–	–	–
Independent Social Credit	2	–	2▲	–	–	–
Total	22	19	3▲	5	5	Steady

Calgary (1948 Alberta general election) (five members elected, candidates ranked in order of 1st preference vote tallies)
Party	Candidate	FPv%	Count																		
Party	Candidate	FPv%	1	2	3	4	5	6	7	8	9	10	11	12	13	14	15	16	17	18	19
Social Credit	Rose Wilkinson	18.29%	7,153	6528																	
Social Credit	Frederick C. Colborne	10.03%	3,923	4,196	4,200	4,205	4,209	4,291	4,299	4,313	4,499	4,562	4,580	4,696	4,805	5,809	5,883	6,764	6764	6520	
Independent Citizen's Association	Howard B. Macdonald	9.82%	3,840	3,847	3,849	3,849	3,854	3,884	4,155	4,162	4,190	4,238	4,245	4,300	5,195	5,205	5,464	5,490	5,985	5,988	6,339
Labour	Peter Morrison	9.15%	3,579	3,596	3,596	3,613	3,664	3,700	3,719	3,744	3,789	3,835	3,880	3,908	3,959	3,982	4,031	4,083	4,160	4,168	
Co-operative Commonwealth	Aylmer Liesemer	6.33%	2,475	2,479	2,568	2,726	2,925	2,944	2,954	3,339	3,355	3,368	4,214	4,227	4,258	4,270	4,327	4,343	4,416	4,417	5,742
Social Credit	James Leslie Hill	6.30%	2,464	2,535	2,537	2,540	2,543	2,671	2,677	2,689	2,809	2,831	2,842	2,856	2,886	3,087	3,128	4,265	4,351	4,580	5,535
Liberal	Hugh John MacDonald	5.06%	1,977	1,981	1,982	1,982	1,986	2,000	2,034	2,037	2,051	2,237	2,240	2,824	2,892	2,901	3,951	3,972	5,876	5,879	6,215
Social Credit	R.B. Estabrook	4.48%	1,751	1,830	1,830	1,831	1,835	1,885	1,891	1,909	1,991	2,004	2,011	2,013	2,041	2,241	2,289				
Liberal	J. Roger Flumerfelt	4.32%	1,691	1,696	1,702	1,704	1,710	1,717	1,728	1,737	1,750	1,874	1,889	2,145	2,223	2,226					
Liberal	Mary Dover	4.10%	1,602	1,610	1,613	1,615	1,616	1,621	1,688	1,692	1,704	1,929	1,936	2,225	2,307	2,320	2,866	2,885			
Liberal	Michael J. McCormick	3.16%	1,237	1,242	1,244	1,244	1,246	1,251	1,258	1,261	1,272	1,429	1,432								
Independent Citizen's Association	M.V. Anderson	3.15%	1,233	1,242	1,242	1,246	1,250	1,272	1,385	1,390	1,412	1,444	1,448	1,461							
Social Credit	George M. Whicher	2.79%	1,091	1,203	1,203	1,207	1,207	1,245	1,253	1,257	1,479	1,510	1,512	1,522	1,537						
Liberal	Loftus Dudley Ward	2.42%	948	951	951	955	957	966	974	977	994										
Independent Social Credit	A.P. Van Buren	1.89%	737	753	756	764	765	843	856	857											
Independent Citizen's Association	Edwina Milvain	1.48%	578	580	586	587	589	598													
Independent Social Credit	Art Larsen	1.44%	563	572	575	577	582														
Co-operative Commonwealth	George Ellinson	1.38%	539	539	596	655	718	721	723												
Co-operative Commonwealth	George R. Austin	1.32%	518	519	542	724	863	871	872	1,058	1,066	1,078									
Labor-Progressive	Terry Levis	1.32%	516	516	518	521															
Co-operative Commonwealth	W. Orr	1.13%	442	442	469																
Co-operative Commonwealth	Mary A. Hart	0.62%	243	243																	
Exhausted ballots		—	—	0	13	27	53	87	106	150	212	234	344	396	470	532	634	771	1,021	1,021	2,222
Electorate: 76,939 Valid: 39,101 Spoilt: 2,359 Quota: 6,517 Turnout: 41,460 (53.9%)

(In the original official report, exhausted votes were not recorded as a separate total but instead resided with candidate that last had the votes. Here exhausted votes reside with winning candidates but are separated out if they arise from the elimination of a candidate.)

Calgary (1948 Alberta general election) (analysis of transferred votes, candidates ranked in order of 1st preference)
Party	Candidate	Maximum round	Maximum votes	Share in maximum round	Maximum votes First round votes Transfer votes
Social Credit	Rose Wilkinson	1	7,153	18.29%	
Social Credit	Frederick C. Colborne	16	6,764	17.65%	
ICA	Howard B. Macdonald	19	6,339	17.20%	
Independent Labour	Peter Morrison	18	4,168	10.95%	
CCF	Aylmer Liesemer	19	5,742	15.58%	
Social Credit	James Leslie Hill	19	5,535	15.01%	
Liberal	Hugh John MacDonald	19	6,215	16.86%	
Social Credit	R.B. Estabrook	15	2,289	5.95%	
Liberal	J. Roger Flumerfelt	14	2,226	5.77%	
Liberal	Mary Dover	16	2,885	7.53%	
Liberal	Michael J. McCormick	11	1,432	3.70%	
ICA	M.V. Anderson	12	1,461	3.78%	
Social Credit	George M. Whicher	13	1,537	3.98%	
Liberal	Loftus Dudley Ward	9	994	2.56%	
Independent Social Credit	A.P. Van Buren	8	858	2.20%	
ICA	Edwina Milvain	6	598	1.53%	
Independent Social Credit	Art Larsen	5	582	1.49%	
CCF	George Ellinson	7	723	1.85%	
CCF	George R. Austin	10	1,078	2.77%	
LPP	Terry Levis	4	521	1.33%	
CCF	W. Orr	3	469	1.20%	
CCF	Mary A. Hart	2	243	0.62%	
Exhausted votes			2,236	5.72%	

=== Edmonton ===
In 1940 and 1944, three parties had full slates. The Independent Movement presented four candidates, and Williams campaigned under his own banner, that of the Veteran's & Active Force.

Party	Candidates			MLAs elected		
Party	1944	1940	±	1944	1940	±
Social Credit	5	5	Steady	3	2	1▲
Co-operative Commonwealth	5	5	Steady	1	1	Steady
Liberal	5	–	5▲	1	–	1▲
Independent Citizen's Association	1	4	3▼	–	1	1▼
Veteran's & Active Force	–	1	1▼	–	1	1▼
Labor-Progressive	–	5	5▼	–	–	–
Total	16	20	4▼	5	5	Steady

Edmonton (1948 Alberta general election) (five members elected, candidates ranked in order of 1st preference)
Party	Candidate	FPv%	Count													
Party	Candidate	FPv%	1	2	3	4	5	6	7	8	9	10	11	12	13	14
Social Credit	Ernest Manning	47.70%	22,014	7692												
Co-operative Commonwealth	Elmer Roper	14.11%	6,511	6,712	6,721	6,876	7,102	7,125	7,511	7,536	7,543	8,869	8684			
Liberal	James Harper Prowse	13.66%	6,303	7,124	7,191	7,192	7,199	7,516	7,534	8,167	7692					
Independent Citizen's Association	John Percy Page	5.90%	2,723	3,913	3,917	3,925	3,941	4,068	4,105	4,148	4,190	4,226	4,306	4,353	4,725	4,883
Liberal	Peter Lazarowich	2.67%	1,234	1,371	1,390	1,395	1,399	1,518	1,529	1,702	2,083	2,115	2,142	2,167	0	
Co-operative Commonwealth	Jack Hampson	2.27%	1,046	1,065	1,066	1,167	1,245	1,250	1,544	1,562	1,567	0				
Social Credit	Clayton Adams	2.05%	946	4,881	4,894	4,895	4,914	4,938	4,958	5,026	5,037	5,047	5,071	5,769	5,938	7,559
Liberal	Mary Scullion	2.04%	942	1,039	1,060	1,060	1,060	1,122	1,133	0						
Social Credit	Lou Heard	1.93%	890	4,778	4,785	4,792	4,797	4,818	4,828	4,864	4,875	4,891	4,910	5,271	5,479	7,746
Social Credit	John Gillies	1.67%	772	3,198	3,203	3,203	3,209	3,246	3,258	3,304	3,317	3,343	3,357	4,110	4,274	0
Co-operative Commonwealth	Mary Crawford	1.34%	618	652	657	697	859	866	0							
Liberal	Francis Ford	1.22%	565	728	770	780	786	0								
Social Credit	Walter Crockett	1.13%	523	1,870	1,874	1,879	1,883	1,905	1,928	1,948	1,953	1,968	1,989	0		
Co-operative Commonwealth	Arthur Thornton	1.08%	498	522	526	561	0									
Co-operative Commonwealth	Joseph Dowler	0.80%	370	381	385	0										
Liberal	William Brownlee	0.42%	195	224	0											
Exhausted ballots		—	—	0	19	36	64	86	130	201	201	307	307	412	1,666	1,894
Electorate: 84,391 Valid: 46,150 Spoilt: 1,126 Quota: 7,692 Turnout: 47,276 (56.0%)

(Exhausted votes reside with winning candidates but are separated out if they arise from the elimination of a candidate. On the eleventh count Roper's surplus votes were transferred where possible, but 8684 of his votes did not bear usable back-up preferences so they were retained by Roper.)

Edmonton (1944 Alberta general election) (analysis of transferred votes, candidates ranked in order of 1st preference)
Party	Candidate	Maximum round	Maximum votes	Share in maximum round	Maximum votes First round votes Transfer votes
Social Credit	Ernest Manning	1	22,014	47.70%	
CCF	Elmer Roper	10	8,869	19.35%	
Liberal	James Harper Prowse	8	8,167	17.77%	
ICA	John Percy Page	14	4,883	11.03%	
Liberal	Peter Lazarowich	12	2,167	4.74%	
CCF	Jack Hampson	9	1,567	3.41%	
Social Credit	Clayton Adams	14	7,559	17.08%	
Liberal	Mary Scullion	7	1,133	2.46%	
Social Credit	Lou Heard	14	7,746	17.50%	
Social Credit	John Gillies	13	4,274	9.61%	
CCF	Mary Crawford	6	866	1.88%	
Liberal	Francis Ford	5	786	1.71%	
Social Credit	Walter Crockett	11	1,989	4.34%	
CCF	Arthur Thornton	4	561	1.22%	
CCF	Joseph Dowler	3	385	0.83%	
Liberal	William Brownlee	2	224	0.49%	
Exhausted votes			1,894	4.10%	

== See also ==
- 1957 Liquor Plebiscite
- 1967 Daylight Saving Plebiscite
- 1971 Daylight Saving Plebiscite
- List of Alberta political parties
