= Lou Heard =

Canadian politician (1909-1987)

Member of the Legislative Assembly of Alberta
- In office August 17, 1948 – August 5, 1952 Serving with Clayton Adams, James Prowse Ernest Manning and Elmer Roper
- Preceded by: Norman James John Page and William J. Williams
- Succeeded by: Edgar Gerhart, John Page, Joseph Ross and Harold Tanner
- Constituency: Edmonton
- In office June 18, 1959 – August 30, 1971
- Preceded by: New District
- Succeeded by: District Abolished
- Constituency: Edmonton North East

Personal details
- Born: March 8, 1909 Crane Lake, Saskatchewan
- Died: February 27, 1987 (aged 77)
- Party: Social Credit
- Occupation: politician

Louis Wesley Heard (March 8, 1909 – February 27, 1987) was a provincial politician from Alberta, Canada. He served as a member of the Legislative Assembly of Alberta twice. The first stint was from 1948 to 1952, and the second was from 1959 to 1971. Heard sat with the Social Credit caucus in government both times.

== Early life ==
Heard was born in Saskatchewan in 1909. He moved to a house once owned by Ambrose Bury in the Edmonton neighborhood of the Highlands in 1946.

== Political career ==
Heard ran for a seat to the Alberta Legislature for the first time in the electoral district of Edmonton as a Social Credit candidate in the 1948 Alberta general election. He won the second place seat to earn is first term in office. Heard did not run again at dissolution of the Legislature in 1952.

Heard ran for a second term in office in the 1959 Alberta general election in the new electoral district of Edmonton North East. He defeated four other candidates with a sizable majority to pick up the new seat for his party.

After winning the election, Heard did not run for another term on the Social Credit provincial executive.

Heard ran for a third term in office in the 1963 Alberta general election, facing a strong challenge from Alberta NDP Leader Neil Reimer. Heard won the district defeating the three other candidates with just over 40% of the popular vote.

Heard ran for a fourth term in the 1967 Alberta general election. He was nearly defeated by NDP candidate Ivor Dent and Progressive Conservative candidate Alan Cooke who also polled a strong vote. Heard took the district with just 35% of the popular vote.

The 1971 boundary redistribution saw Edmonton North East abolished. Heard ran for re-election that year in the new district of Edmonton-Beverly. Heard was easily defeated by Progressive Conservative candidate Bill Diachuk.
