= 1952 Alberta general election =

- August 5, 1952

61 seats in the Legislative Assembly of Alberta 31 seats were needed for a majority
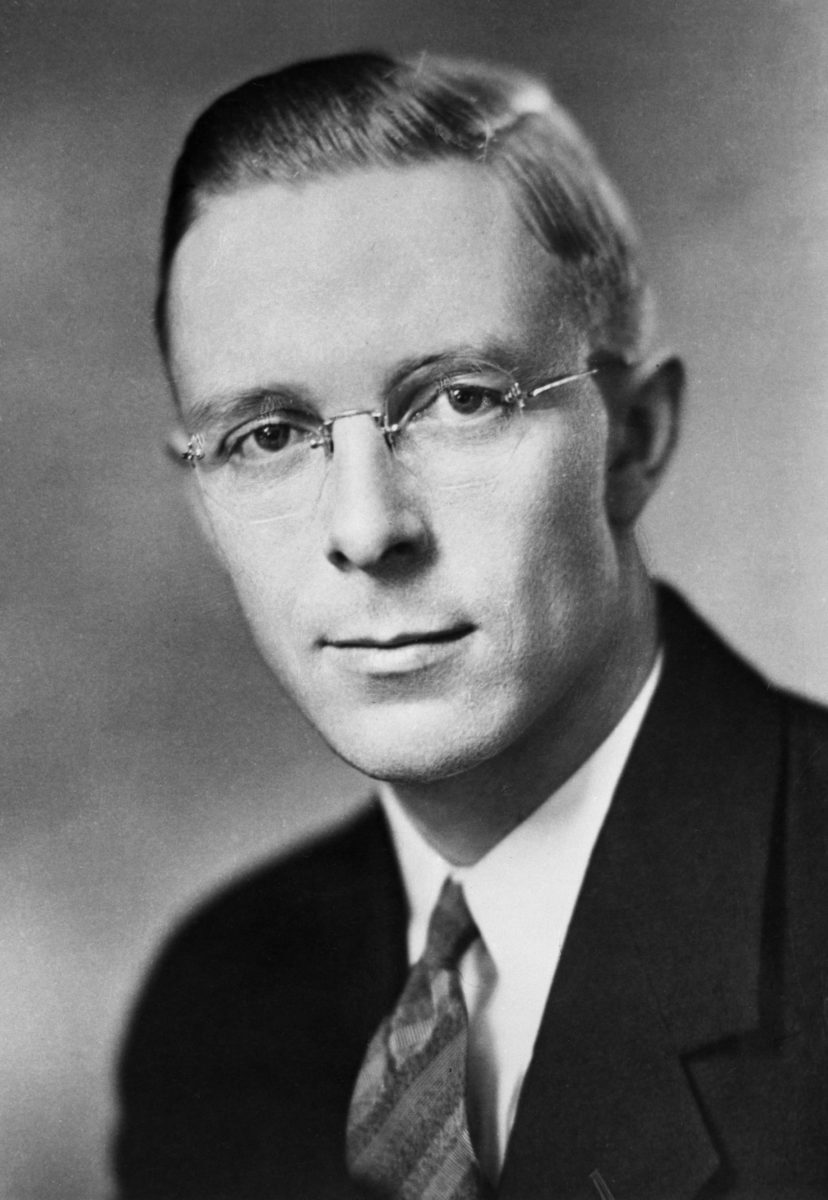

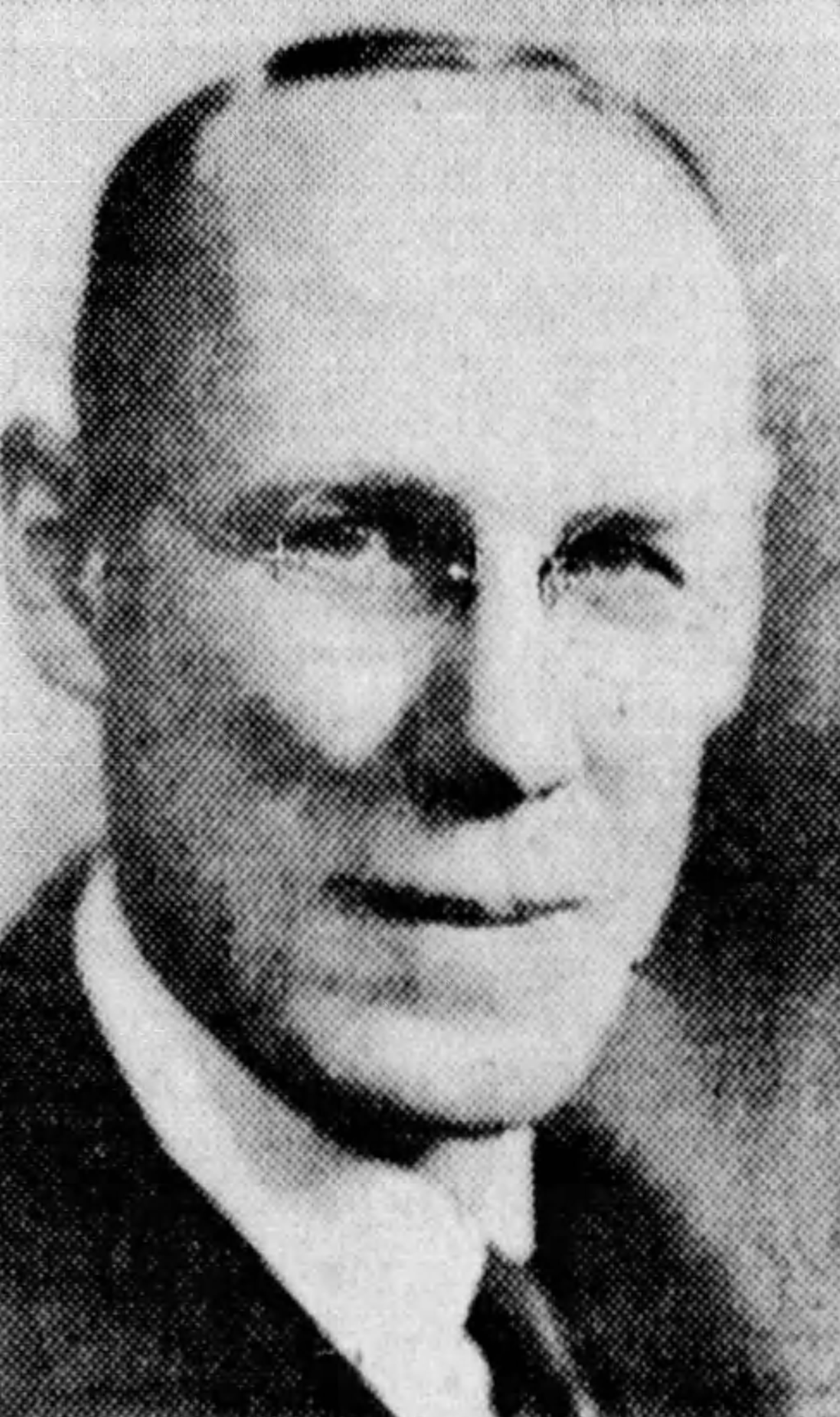
	Majority party	Minority party
		LIB
Leader	Ernest Manning	James H. Prowse
Party	Social Credit	Liberal
Leader since	May 31, 1943	June 25, 1947
Leader's seat	Edmonton	Edmonton
Last election	51 seats, 55.6%	2 seats, 17.9%
Seats before	49	2
Seats won	53	3
Seat change	▲4	▲1
Popular vote	167,789	66,738
Percentage	56.2%	22.4%
Swing	▲0.6%	▲4.5%
	Third party	Fourth party
		CON
Leader	Elmer E. Roper	None
Party	Co-operative Commonwealth	Conservative
Leader since	1942
Leader's seat	Edmonton
Last election	2 seats, 19.1%	did not contest
Seats before	2	0
Seats won	2	2
Seat change	±0	▲2
Popular vote	41,929	10,971
Percentage	14.1%	3.7%
Swing	▼4.7%	—
Premier before election
Ernest Manning
Social Credit
Premier after election
Ernest Manning
Social Credit

The 1952 Alberta general election was held on August 5, 1952, to elect members of the Legislative Assembly of Alberta.

Ernest C. Manning in his third election as leader of the Social Credit Party, and its first election since the Social Credit Party paid off Alberta's first debt in 1949, led it to its fifth consecutive election victory, increasing its share of the popular vote, and winning fifty two of the sixty one seats in the legislature.

The Liberal Party formed the official opposition with only four seats. The Conservative Party returned to Alberta politics again, nominating candidates both under the "Conservative" banner, and under the "Progressive Conservative" banner recently adopted by its federal counterpart. The party won two seats, one under each banner. The Cooperative Commonwealth Federation won two seats, one that of leader Elmer Roper. The remaining seat was won by an independent.

This provincial election, like the previous six, saw district-level proportional representation (Single transferable voting) used to elect the MLAs of Edmonton and Calgary. City-wide districts were used to elect multiple MLAs in the cities. All the other MLAs were elected in single-member districts through Instant-runoff voting.

Voter turn-out was 59.4 per cent in this election.

== Electoral redistribution ==
An Act was passed in 1950 that provided for the increase in the number of MLAs from 57 to 61, upon the next election. Calgary now returned six MLAs and Edmonton seven (instead of the five each previously had), and the following other changes were made:

Abolished	New
New districts
	Bonnyville (Note: from part of St. Paul)
Renaming of districts
Beaver River	Lac La Biche (Note: also receiving part of Athabasca)

== Results ==
Elections to the 12th Alberta Legislative Assembly (1952)
Party	Leader	Candidates	First-preference votes				Seats		
Party	Leader	Candidates	Votes	±	% Fpv	Change (pp)	1948	1952	±
Social Credit	Ernest C. Manning	61	167,789	3,786▲	56.24	0.61	51	53 / 61	2▲
Liberal	James H. Prowse	55	66,738	14,083▲	22.37	4.51	2	3 / 61	1▲
Co-operative Commonwealth	Elmer Roper	41	41,929	14,458▼	14.05	-5.08	2	2 / 61	Steady
Conservative		5	6,271	6,271▲	2.10	2.10	–	1 / 61	1▲
Progressive Conservative		7	4,700	4,700▲	1.57	1.57	–	1 / 61	1▲
Independent Social Credit		6	4,203	1,245▲	1.41	0.41	1	1 / 61	Steady
Independent Citizen's Association		Did not campaign (Note: John P. Page campaigned and won re-election as a Conservative.)				-4.40	1	0 / 61	1▼
Independent Labour		1	2,927	2,071▼	0.98	0.68			
Labor-Progressive		2	1,132	240▼	0.47	-3.67			
Independent		1	705	705▼	0.24	0.24			
Farmer		1	655	655▲	0.22	0.22			
Labour		1	527	3,052▼	0.18	-1.03			
Independent Farmer		1	463	463▲	0.16	0.16			
People's candidate		1	296	296▲	0.10	0.10			
Total		183	298,335		100.00%				
Rejected ballots			20,613	2,906▲					
Turnout			318,948	6,448▲	59.4%	4.1▼			
Registered voters			537,170	47,859▲					

== MLAs elected ==
Acadia-Coronation: Clarence Gerhart
Alexandra: Anders Aalborg
Athabasca: Antonio Aloisio
Banff-Cochrane: Lee Leavitt
Bonnyville: Laudas Joly
Bow Valley-Empress: Wilson Cain
Bruce: Earl Hardy
Calgary: Paul Brecken (PC)
Calgary: Frederick C. Colborne
Calgary: Arthur Dixon
Calgary: Howard B. MacDonald
Calgary: Hugh John MacDonald
Calgary: Rose Wilkinson
Camrose: Chester Sayers
Cardston: Edgar Hinman
Clover Bar: Floyd Baker
Cypress: James Underdahl
Didsbury: Howard Hammell
Drumheller: Gordon Taylor
Edmonton: Edgar Gerhart
Edmonton: Ernest Manning
Edmonton: John Page (Con)
Edmonton: James Harper Prowse
Edmonton: Elmer Roper
Edmonton: Joseph Donovan Ross
Edmonton: Harold Tanner
Edson: Norman Willmore
Gleichen: George E. Bell
Grande Prairie: Ira McLaughlin
Grouard: Joseph Desfosses
Hand Hills: Wallace Warren Cross
Lac La Biche: Harry Lobay
Lac Ste. Anne: Angelo Montemurro
Lacombe: Allen Patrick
Leduc: Ronald Ansley (I-SC)
Lethbridge: John Landeryou
Little Bow: Peter Dawson
Macleod: James Hartley
Medicine Hat: John Lyle Robinson
Okotoks-High River: Ivan Casey
Olds: Frederick Niddrie
Peace River: William Gilliland
Pembina: Robin Jorgenson
Pincher Creek-Crowsnest: William Kovach
Ponoka: Glen Johnston
Red Deer: David Ure
Redwater: Peter Chaba
Rocky Mountain House: Alfred Hooke
St. Albert: Lucien Maynard
St. Paul: Raymond Reierson
Sedgewick: Jack Hillman
Spirit River: Adolph Fimrite
Stettler: John Clark
Stony Plain: Cornelia Wood
Taber: Roy S. Lee
Vegreville: Michael Ponich
Vermilion: William Cornish
Wainwright: William Masson
Warner: Leonard Halmrast
Wetaskiwin: John Wingblade
Willingdon: Nick Dushenski

=== Synopsis of results ===
Results by riding – 1952 Alberta general election (all except Calgary, Edmonton and servicemember MLAs)
Riding	First-preference votes (Note: There were no Conservative or PC candidates outside Calgary and Edmonton.)						Turnout (Note: including spoilt ballots)	Final counts					Winning party	
Name	SC	CCF	Lib	I-SC	Oth	Total	Turnout	SC	CCF	Lib	I-SC	Farm	1948	1952
Acadia-Coronation	Acclamation												SC	SC
Alexandra	2,412	1,071	–	–	–	3,483	58.2%	Elected on 1st count					SC	SC
Athabasca	2,012	623	864	–	463	3,962	66.3%	Elected on 1st count					SC	SC
Banff-Cochrane	1,845	–	1,035	491	–	3,371	56.8%	Elected on 1st count					I-SC	SC
Bonnyville	2,497	–	1,290	–	–	3,787	67.4%	Elected on 1st count					New	SC
Bow Valley-Empress	2,475	–	1,560	–	–	4,035	67.9%	Elected on 1st count					SC	SC
Bruce	2,157	1,210	756	–	–	4,123	67.9%	Elected on 1st count					SC	SC
Camrose	2,919	1,132	1,015	–	–	5,066	65.1%	Elected on 1st count					SC	SC
Cardston	2,011	–	630	–	–	2,641	56.0%	Elected on 1st count					SC	SC
Clover Bar	2,238	935	769	–	–	3,942	66.2%	Elected on 1st count					SC	SC
Cypress	2,240	–	1,048	–	–	3,288	61.2%	Elected on 1st count					SC	SC
Didsbury	2,870	–	1,253	–	–	4,123	62.0%	Elected on 1st count					SC	SC
Drumheller	3,458	–	–	–	308	3,766	62.0%	Elected on 1st count					SC	SC
Edson	2,480	–	1,965	–	–	4,445	60.8%	Elected on 1st count					SC	SC
Gleichen	2,061	273	675	–	–	3,009	61.0%	Elected on 1st count					SC	SC
Grande Prairie	2,967	902	935	–	–	4,804	65.4%	Elected on 1st count					SC	SC
Grouard	2,234	951	2,358	–	–	5,543	65.5%	2,405	–	2,558	–	–	SC	Lib
Hand Hills	2,806	–	1,145	–	–	3,951	69.0%	Elected on 1st count					SC	SC
Lac La Biche	1,832	–	1,792	–	–	3,624	68.5%	Elected on 1st count					SC	SC
Lac Ste. Anne	1,639	1,520	1,069	469	–	4,697	71.9%	2,034	1,878	–	–	–	SC	SC
Lacombe	2,446	975	757	–	–	4,178	70.3%	Elected on 1st count					SC	SC
Leduc	1,207	1,331	–	2,051	–	4,589	63.7%	–	1,422	–	2,406	–	SC	I-SC
Lethbridge	4,975	–	1,901	–	–	6,876	53.7%	Elected on 1st count					SC	SC
Little Bow	2,668	411	1,001	–	–	4,080	71.0%	Elected on 1st count					SC	SC
Macleod	3,232	496	773	–	–	4,501	83.9%	Elected on 1st count					SC	SC
Medicine Hat	4,724	–	1,601	–	–	6,325	58.8%	Elected on 1st count					SC	SC
Okotoks-High River	3,077	–	1,291	–	–	4,368	64.8%	Elected on 1st count					SC	SC
Olds	3,064	–	1,611	–	–	4,675	66.6%	Elected on 1st count					SC	SC
Peace River	3,352	1,177	1,214	–	–	5,743	57.8%	Elected on 1st count					SC	SC
Pembina	2,818	941	1,127	–	–	4,886	69.5%	Elected on 1st count					SC	SC
Pincher Creek-Crowsnest	3,207	–	1,008	–	–	4,215	62.4%	Elected on 1st count					SC	SC
Ponoka	2,377	800	1,214	–	–	4,391	70.7%	Elected on 1st count					SC	SC
Red Deer	4,907	1,496	–	–	–	6,403	58.8%	Elected on 1st count					SC	SC
Redwater	1,677	1,002	1,268	–	296	4,243	68.8%	1,833	–	1,644	–	–	SC	SC
Rocky Mountain House	2,886	1,165	–	–	–	4,051	56.2%	Elected on 1st count					SC	SC
St. Albert	2,218	1,292	1,496	–	–	5,006	70.6%	2,420	–	2,019	–	–	SC	SC
St. Paul	2,581	–	2,235	–	–	4,816	71.1%	Elected on 1st count					SC	SC
Sedgewick	2,714	634	813	–	–	4,161	68.7%	Elected on 1st count					SC	SC
Spirit River	1,738	1,222	861	550	–	4,371	66.3%	2,041	1,418	–	–	–	SC	SC
Stettler	2,275	752	1,225	442	–	4,694	69.6%	2,397	784	1,339	–	–	SC	SC
Stony Plain	1,991	1,218	1,062	–	–	4,271	68.7%	2,177	1,530	–	–	–	SC	SC
Taber	2,809	–	717	–	–	3,526	58.0%	Elected on 1st count					SC	SC
Vegreville	1,981	1,434	1,182	–	–	4,597	75.4%	2,239	1,710	–	–	–	SC	SC
Vermilion	1,955	869	835	–	655	4,014	66.3%	2,058	–	983	–	713	SC	SC
Wainwright	2,578	–	1,105	–	705	4,388	62.0%	Elected on 1st count					SC	SC
Warner	1,904	–	633	–	–	2,537	49.3%	Elected on 1st count					SC	SC
Wetaskiwin	2,664	1,029	1,029	200	–	4,922	66.7%	Elected on 1st count					SC	SC
Willingdon	1,716	1,760	660	–	–	4,136	75.1%	1,812	2,026	–	–	–	SC	CCF

= Open seat
= turnout is above provincial average
= Candidate was in previous Legislature
= Incumbent had switched allegiance
= Previously incumbent in another riding
= Not incumbent; was previously elected to the Legislature
= Incumbency arose from by-election gain
= previously an MP in the House of Commons of Canada
= Multiple candidates

=== Multi-member districts ===
District	Seats won (in order declared)
Calgary	
Edmonton	

Social Credit
CCF
Liberal
Conservative (in Edmonton); Progressive Conservative (in Calgary)

= Candidate was in previous Legislature
= Candidate had previously been in the Legislature
= First-time MLA

== STV analysis ==
=== Exhausted votes ===
Thirteen districts went beyond first-preference counts in order to determine winning candidates:

Exhausted votes (1952)
District	Counts		Exhausted	
District	1st preference	Final	Votes	% of 1st pref
Calgary	41,673	40,019	1,654	3.97
Edmonton	52,039	47,149	4,890	9.40
Grouard	5,543	4,963	580	10.46
Lac Ste. Anne	4,697	3,912	785	16.71
Leduc	4,589	3,828	761	16.58
Redwater	4,243	3,477	766	18.05
St. Albert	5,006	4,439	567	11.33
Spirit River	4,371	3,459	912	20.86
Stettler	4,694	4,520	177	3.77
Stony Plain	4,271	3,707	564	13.21
Vegreville	4,597	3,949	648	14.10
Vermilion	4,014	3,754	260	6.48
Willingdon	4,136	3,838	298	7.21

=== Calgary ===
All major parties other than the Progressive Conservatives fielded full slates.

Party	Candidates			MLAs elected		
Party	1952	1948	±	1952	1948	±
Social Credit	6	5	1▲	4	2	2▲
Progressive Conservative	5	–	5▲	1	–	1▲
Liberal	6	5	1▲	1	1	Steady
Co-operative Commonwealth	6	5	1▲	–	1	1▼
Independent Citizen's Association	–	3	3▼	–	1	1▼
Labour	1	1	Steady	–	–	–
Independent Labour	1	–	1▲	–	–	–
Independent Social Credit	–	2	2▼	–	–	–
Labor-Progressive	–	1	1▼	–	–	–
Total	25	22	3▲	6	5	1▲

Calgary (1952 Alberta general election) (six members elected, candidates ranked in order of 1st preference)
Party	Candidate	FPv%	Count																					
Party	Candidate	FPv%	1	2	3	4	5	6	7	8	9	10	11	12	13	14	15	16	17	18	19	20	21	22
Social Credit	Rose Wilkinson	16.31%	6,796																					
Social Credit	Howard B. Macdonald	10.11%	4,214	4,346	4,346	4,350	4,355	4,365	4,369	4,371	4,397	4,417	4,442	4,489	4,502	4,547	4,565	4,614	4,696	4,902	4,929	6,167		
Social Credit	Frederick C. Colborne	9.54%	3,974	4,252	4,252	4,254	4,258	4,268	4,276	4,298	4,318	4,401	4,420	4,438	4,449	4,470	4,492	4,563	4,607	6,292				
Progressive Conservative	Paul Brecken	7.50%	3,126	3,147	3,151	3,154	3,160	3,176	3,179	3,183	3,184	3,211	3,351	3,391	3,886	4,380	4,454	4,552	5,607	5,656	5,657	5,725	5,730	6,269
Independent Labour	Donald Fraser McIntosh	7.02%	2,927	2,940	2,945	2,951	2,956	2,966	2,972	2,977	3,110	3,121	3,142	3,166	3,195	3,228	3,276	3,315	3,371	3,419	3,420	3,550	3,554	
Social Credit	Thomas Glen	6.77%	2,820	2,870	2,871	2,872	2,874	2,876	2,890	2,893	2,905	2,911	2,916	2,919	2,926	2,934	2,949	2,966	2,981	3,172	3,199			
Liberal	Hugh John MacDonald	6.51%	2,711	2,724	2,724	2,730	2,771	2,833	2,834	2,842	2,867	2,991	3,030	3,547	3,580	3,663	3,675	4,499	4,619	4,659	4,661	4,747	4,750	5,216
Social Credit	Arthur J. Dixon	6.42%	2,677	2,759	2,762	2,763	2,766	2,776	2,776	2,779	2,790	2,816	2,829	2,837	2,840	2,846	2,858	2,874	2,981	3,312	3,586	4,954	5,149	5,966
Social Credit	Clifford Norman Clarke	5.74%	2,390	2,587	2,589	2,592	2,595	2,603	2,607	2,610	2,620	2,681	2,688	2,693	2,710	2,721	2,741	2,758	2,777					
Co-operative Commonwealth	Aylmer Liesemer	4.78%	1,991	1,993	2,030	2,136	2,142	2,142	2,380	2,498	2,642	2,651	2,664	2,670	2,681	2,695	3,508	3,528	3,575	3,600	3,601	3,693	3,696	4,706
Progressive Conservative	Philip P. C. Haigh	2.17%	905	908	908	908	924	925	935	937	939	957	1,083	1,098	1,176	1,508	1,523	1,551						
Liberal	Melvin E. Shannon	2.06%	857	860	861	865	889	936	937	949	986	1,072	1,100	1,226	1,241	1,266	1,275							
Progressive Conservative	John James Zubick	1.93%	806	811	812	814	814	823	825	829	834	839	887	894										
Progressive Conservative	W. R. Irwin	1.83%	764	764	764	767	776	779	780	780	782	793	984	996	1,117									
Progressive Conservative	Ronald M. Helmer	1.61%	670	672	675	676	685	688	689	693	693	698												
Co-operative Commonwealth	Robert T. Alderman	1.52%	633	637	715	735	735	741	798	1,040	1,084	1,097	1,103	1,107	1,140	1,147								
Liberal	Alberta Clark	1.35%	563	580	581	582	598	660	662	664	667													
Liberal	Collier Maberly	1.33%	555	557	558	563	676	699	699	699	722	850	853											
Labour	W. Longridge	1.26%	527	528	529	541	548	550	550	551														
Co-operative Commonwealth	George E. Ellinson	0.91%	378	378	396	409	410	410																
Co-operative Commonwealth	H. J. Ryan	0.80%	333	334	375	422	422	425	460															
Liberal	Richard Thomson	0.75%	313	315	315	317	325																	
Liberal	J. A. Murray Green	0.69%	287	288	288	289																		
Co-operative Commonwealth	Harold L. Livergant	0.58%	243	243	251																			
Co-operative Commonwealth	Ronald W. Stirling	0.51%	213	213																				
Exhausted ballots		—	—	13	21	29	40	84	101	126	179	213	227	248	276	314	403	499	505	707	712	929	932	1,654
Electorate: 91,289 Valid: 41,673 Spoilt: 1,694 Quota: 5,954 Turnout: 43,367 (47.5%)

Calgary (1952 Alberta general election) (analysis of transferred votes, candidates ranked in order of 1st preference)
Party	Candidate	Maximum round	Maximum votes	Share in maximum round	Maximum votes First round votes Transfer votes
Social Credit	Rose Wilkinson	1	6,796	16.31%	
Social Credit	Howard B. Macdonald	20	6,167	15.14%	
Social Credit	Frederick C. Colborne	18	6,292	15.36%	
PC	Paul Brecken	22	6,269	15.67%	
Independent Labour	Donald Fraser McIntosh	21	3,554	8.72%	
Social Credit	Thomas Glen	19	3,199	7.81%	
Liberal	Hugh John MacDonald	22	5,216	13.03%	
Social Credit	Arthur J. Dixon	22	5,966	14.91%	
Social Credit	Clifford Norman Clarke	17	2,777	6.75%	
CCF	Aylmer Liesemer	22	4,706	11.76%	
PC	Philip P. C. Haigh	16	1,551	3.77%	
Liberal	Melvin E. Shannon	15	1,275	3.09%	
PC	John James Zubick	12	894	2.16%	
PC	W. R. Irwin	13	1,117	2.70%	
PC	Ronald M. Helmer	10	698	1.68%	
CCF	Robert T. Alderman	14	1,147	2.77%	
Liberal	Alberta Clark	9	667	1.61%	
Liberal	Collier Maberly	11	853	1.33%	
Labour	W. Longridge	8	551	1.33%	
CCF	George Ellinson	6	410	0.99%	
CCF	H. J. Ryan	7	460	1.11%	
Liberal	Richard Thomson	5	325	0.78%	
Liberal	J. A. Murray Green	4	289	0.69%	
CCF	Harold L. Livergant	3	251	0.60%	
CCF	Ronald W. Stirling	2	213	0.51%	
Exhausted votes			1,654	3.97%	

=== Edmonton ===
All major parties ran full slates. There were also two Labour candidates

Party	Candidates			MLAs elected		
Party	1952	1948	±	1952	1948	±
Social Credit	7	5	2▲	3	3	Steady
Liberal	7	5	2▲	2	1	1▲
Co-operative Commonwealth	7	5	2▲	1	1	Steady
Conservative	7	–	7▲	1	–	1▲
Labor-Progressive	1	–	1▲	–	–	–
Independent Citizen's Association	–	1	1▼	–	–	–
Total	29	16	13▲	7	5	2▲

Edmonton (1952 Alberta general election) (seven members elected, candidates ranked in order of 1st preference)
Party	Candidate	FPv%	Count																									
Party	Candidate	FPv%	1	2	3	4	5	6	7	8	9	10	11	12	13	14	15	16	17	18	19	20	21	22	23	24	25	26
Social Credit	Ernest Manning	32.71%	22,014																									
Liberal	James Harper Prowse	13.96%	7,264	7,264																								
Co-operative Commonwealth	Elmer Roper	12.74%	6,632	6,632	6,632																							
Conservative	John Percy Page	4.25%	2,212	2,761	2,810	2,817	2,851	2,898	2,996	3,006	3,016	3,289	3,410	3,421	3,443	3,466	3,564	3,576	3,787	3,830	3,856	4,804	4,948	5,017	5,188	5,267	5,291	5,504
Social Credit	Joseph Donovan Ross	3.38%	1,757	4,967	4,977	4,977	4,981	4,988	4,995	4,997	5,003	5,028	5,044	5,058	5,069	5,085	5,126	5,139	5,189	5,499	5,516	5,711	5,766	6,205	6,328	7,126		
Social Credit	Ambrose Holowach	2.65%	1,381	2,659	2,660	2,661	2,662	2,664	2,667	2,670	2,671	2,677	2,681	2,686	2,691	2,716	2,730	2,734	2,748	3,252	3,278	3,363	3,695	4,005	4,110	4,540	4,745	4,809
Liberal	Andre Milville Dechene	2.57%	1,340	1,389	1,471	1,471	1,471	1,472	1,479	1,481	1,482	1,487	1,521	1,526	1,749	1,751	1,860	1,866	2,252	2,257	2,268	2,305	2,587	2,839				
Liberal	Peter Lazarowich	2.18%	1,136	1,214	1,280	1,282	1,283	1,288	1,290	1,291	1,293	1,297	1,317	1,337	1,379	1,405	1,592	1,596	1,735	1,748	1,776	1,815						
Social Credit	Harry D. Carrigan	2.18%	1,135	1,814	1,818	1,819	1,821	1,826	1,832	1,834	1,838	1,841	1,850	1,852	1,935	1,936	1,949	1,956	1,986	2,152	2,158	2,211	2,230					
Social Credit	Stella M. Baker	2.16%	1,126	2,251	2,253	2,253	2,254	2,257	2,271	2,273	2,276	2,280	2,285	2,290	2,295	2,306	2,320	2,341	2,385	2,554	2,567	2,646	2,676	3,033	3,084			
Conservative	Marshall E. Manning	2.04%	1,060	1,194	1,202	1,203	1,212	1,227	1,269	1,269	1,272	1,358	1,628	1,636	1,644	1,654	1,673	1,677	1,727	1,754	1,770							
Liberal	Harold Tanner	1.68%	875	1,037	1,258	1,261	1,269	1,282	1,296	1,300	1,309	1,352	1,372	1,376	1,441	1,477	1,755	1,765	2,157	2,178	2,200	2,274	2,897	2,953	4,621	4,667	4,680	4,921
Social Credit	Williston Haszard	1.60%	834	1,609	1,610	1,610	1,612	1,614	1,616	1,619	1,619	1,624	1,629	1,632	1,638	1,644	1,659	1,664	1,679									
Labor-Progressive	Bernard Swankey	1.58%	824	831	833	833	835	845	845	847	866	871	872	881	881													
Liberal	Cora Casselman	1.57%	819	964	1,091	1,092	1,093	1,097	1,123	1,126	1,131	1,165	1,180	1,185	1,318	1,333	1,467	1,484										
Social Credit	Edgar Gerhart	1.48%	769	2,601	2,603	2,603	2,603	2,606	2,610	2,626	2,632	2,638	2,648	2,655	2,664	2,670	2,692	2,701	2,736	3,090	3,103	3,201	3,225	3,834	3,895	5,416	5,791	5,895
Co-operative Commonwealth	Robert Atkin	1.26%	658	683	685	705	705	708	714	771	819	822	824	927	927	1,044	1,054											
Liberal	Laurette C. Douglas	1.21%	632	664	709	709	711	713	719	723	727	732	748	749														
Co-operative Commonwealth	Roy Jamha	1.19%	619	641	643	656	656	656	658	833	902	905	908	1,055	1,057	1,192	1,209	1,688	1,698	1,705								
Co-operative Commonwealth	Arthur E. Thornton	1.18%	612	640	642	664	665	668	677	718	917	920	924	1,152	1,154	1,323	1,341	1,709	1,728	1,734	3,004	3,024	3,057	3,076	3,114	3,135	3,139	
Liberal	Duncan Innes	1.17%	608	727	837	837	838	841	842	846	848	868	883	893	1,007	1,014												
Co-operative Commonwealth	Floyd Albin Johnson	0.96%	500	522	524	538	538	539	542	590	648	648	649															
Conservative	Marcel Lambert	0.83%	432	480	484	484	490	508	586	587	587	609																
Conservative	Frederick John Mitchell	0.83%	430	531	537	538	543	553	574	575	576																	
Co-operative Commonwealth	Norman Finnemore	0.79%	413	427	428	439	439	440	440																			
Co-operative Commonwealth	Winnifred Scott	0.74%	383	410	414	444	446	448	453	496																		
Conservative	Mrs. Arnold Taylor	0.52%	272	300	303	303	322	375																				
Conservative	John A. L. Smith	0.36%	189	205	207	207	220																					
Conservative	Edward Sturrock	0.20%	105	117	118	118																						
Exhausted ballots		—	—	0	0	0	4	11	30	46	92	113	151	213	232	508	533	628	717	771	1,028	1,170	1,443	1,562	2,184	2,373	2,373	4,890
Electorate: 108,424 Valid: 52,039 Spoilt: 5,217 Quota: 6,505 Turnout: 57,256 (52.8%)

Edmonton (1952 Alberta general election) (analysis of transferred votes, candidates ranked in order of 1st preference)
Party	Candidate	Maximum round	Maximum votes	Share in maximum round	Maximum votes First round votes Transfer votes
Social Credit	Ernest Manning	1	17,022	32.71%	
Liberal	James Harper Prowse	1	7,264	13.96%	
CCF	Elmer Roper	1	6,632	12.74%	
Conservative	John Percy Page	26	5,504	10.37%	
Social Credit	Joseph Donovan Ross	24	7,126	14.35%	
Social Credit	Ambrose Holowach	26	4,809	10.20%	
Liberal	Andre Milville Dechene	22	2,839	5.62%	
Liberal	Peter Lazarowich	20	1,815	3.57%	
Social Credit	Harry D. Carrigan	21	2,230	4.41%	
Social Credit	Stella M. Baker	23	3,084	6.19%	
Conservative	Marshall E. Manning	19	1,770	3.47%	
Liberal	Harold Tanner	26	4,921	10.44%	
Social Credit	Williston Haszard	17	1,679	3.27%	
LPP	Bernard Swankey	13	881	1.70%	
Liberal	Cora Casselman	16	1,484	2.89%	
Social Credit	Edgar Gerhart	26	5,895	12.50%	
CCF	Robert Atkin	15	1,054	2.05%	
Liberal	Laurette C. Douglas	12	749	1.45%	
CCF	Roy Jamha	18	1,705	3.33%	
CCF	Arthur Thornton	25	3,139	6.32%	
Liberal	Duncan Innes	14	1,014	1.97%	
CCF	Floyd Albin Johnson	11	649	1.25%	
Conservative	Marcel Lambert	10	609	1.17%	
Conservative	Frederick John Mitchell	9	576	1.11%	
CCF	Norman Finnemore	7	440	0.85%	
CCF	Winnifred Scott	8	496	0.95%	
Conservative	Mrs. Arnold Taylor	6	375	0.72%	
Conservative	John A. L. Smith	5	220	0.42%	
Conservative	Edward Sturrock	4	118	0.23%	
Exhausted votes			4,890	9.40%	

== See also ==
- List of Alberta political parties
