= J. Percy Page High School =

10-12 school in Edmonton, Alberta (est. 1984)

Location
- 2707 Millwoods Road NW; Edmonton, Alberta, T6K 4A6; Canada; 53°27′23″N 113°26′48″W

Information
- School type: Secondary School
- Founded: 1984
- School board: Edmonton Public Schools
- Superintendent: Ron Thompson
- Area trustee: Saadiq Sumar
- Principal: Suzanne Fuller
- Grades: 10-12
- Enrollment: 1200
- Language: English
- Area: Mill Woods
- Colours: Maroon, white, and black
- Mascot: Percy the Panther
- Website: jpercypage.epsb.ca

J. Percy Page High School is a high school located in Edmonton, Alberta, Canada in the southern neighbourhood of Mill Woods. It borders Holy Trinity, and the multi-recreational Mill Woods Park. The school offers many opportunities for students including an Advanced Placement (AP) program, CTS courses and a Registered Apprenticeship Program (R.A.P.).

== History ==
In the mid-1970s city planners, school boards, and community leaders developed a vision for the community of Mill Woods. Since then, the population of Mill Woods has expanded at an extraordinary rate. It now supports ten community leagues, which encompass the high school and a population of approximately 90,000. J. Percy Page School has become the hub of this very large community, maintaining an enrollment of about 1100 students. J. Percy Page High School opened in 1984, and was named after former Lieutenant Governor of Alberta, J. Percy Page. ....

== Student Activities ==
J. Percy Page has a wide number of student activities including Students' Union. The Students' Union is run by a team of 5 to 7 executives elected by the students of the previous year, as well as any students who wish to be involved. The Students' Union direct the leadership class, which hosts many events such as Panther Pride Week, Eid and Diwali celebrations, Hallowe'en fashion shows, spring break talent shows, and various lunch hour events. The leadership program at Page has over 100 students enrolled in classes. These students attend leadership retreats, learn leadership and teamwork skills, host events, volunteer in the community and mentor with younger people in surrounding schools.

As well as Students' Union, J. Percy Page offers PageTV. PageTV is a student-run newscast aired over the school television from 8:35 am to approximately 8:40 am from Monday to Thursday. The program includes school announcements, weather, sports, movie reviews, as well as anything else the students or teachers of the school wish to present.

J. Percy Page also offers a wide variety of athletics including volleyball, basketball, football, rugby, cross-country, track and field, dance, swimming, water polo, wrestling, handball and curling. J. Percy Page's school team and mascot is the Panthers, with the school colours of burgundy/maroon, white, and black.

J. Percy Page also has 2 robotics teams that compete in FIRST robotics competitions

== Courses offered ==
J. Percy Page offers a wide variety of courses in addition to the main core subjects. These courses are referred to Career and Technology Studies (CTS). Some of the courses include: Mechanics, Construction Technology, Cosmetology (up to 4 years apprenticeship program), Art, Drama, Guitar, Music (Instrumental and Choral) Accounting/Financial Management, Computing Science, Robotics, Graphic Arts, Multimedia Studies, Leadership and Foods. Page also offers the Registered Apprenticeship Program (RAP) for students seeking to work in the trades. Students registered in RAP attend classes in one semester, and work as an apprentice in the other while earning credits. Language courses available are French, Spanish and Punjabi. Work Experience is also offered where students get 1 credit for every 25 hours worked .

== See also ==
- Edmonton Public Schools
- Schools in Alberta
