= Clover Bar =

Defunct provincial electoral district in Alberta, Canada

Alberta electoral district

Defunct provincial electoral district
- Legislature: Legislative Assembly of Alberta
- District created: 1930
- District abolished: 1993
- First contested: 1930
- Last contested: 1989

Clover Bar was a provincial electoral district in Alberta, Canada, mandated to return a single member to the Legislative Assembly of Alberta from 1930 to 1993.

== History ==
The Clover Bar electoral district was formed from the Edmonton, Leduc, Camrose and Victoria electoral districts prior to the 1930 Alberta general election. The Clover Bar electoral district would be abolished and the Clover Bar-Fort Saskatchewan electoral district would be formed in its place prior to the 1993 Alberta general election.

=== Members of the Legislative Assembly (MLAs) ===
Members of the Legislative Assembly for Clover Bar
Assembly	Years	Member	Party
See Camrose, Edmonton electoral district from 1921-1930, Leduc electoral district from 1905-1930 and Victoria electoral district from 1905-1930
7th	1930–1935	Rudolph Hennig	United Farmers
8th	1935–1940	Floyd M. Baker	Social Credit
9th	1940–1944	Floyd M. Baker	Social Credit
10th	1944–1948	Floyd M. Baker	Social Credit
11th	1948–1952	Floyd M. Baker	Social Credit
12th	1952–1955	Floyd M. Baker	Social Credit
13th	1955–1959	Floyd M. Baker	Social Credit
14th	1959–1963	Floyd M. Baker	Social Credit
15th	1963–1967	Floyd M. Baker	Social Credit
16th	1967–1971	Walter A. Buck	Social Credit
17th	1971–1975	Walter A. Buck	Social Credit
18th	1975–1979	Walter A. Buck	Social Credit
19th	1979–1982	Walter A. Buck	Social Credit
20th	1982–1986	Walter A. Buck	Independent
21st	1986–1989	Walter A. Buck	Representative
22nd	1989–1993	Kurt Gesell	Progressive Conservative
See Clover Bar-Fort Saskatchewan electoral district from 1993-2001

== Election results ==
=== 1930 ===
1930 Alberta general election: Clover Bar
Party	Candidate	Votes	%	±%
United Farmers	Rudolph Hennig	1,338	46.20%	–
Independent	Christian Hein	866	29.90%	–
Conservative	S. T. Bigelow	692	23.90%	–
Total		2,896	–	–
Ballot transfer results
United Farmers	Rudolph Hennig	1,462	56.73%	–
Independent	Christian Hein	1,115	43.27%	–
Total		2,577	–	–
Rejected, spoiled and declined		170	–	–
Eligible electors / turnout		4,451	68.88%	–
United Farmers pickup new district.				
Source(s) Source: "Clover Bar Official Results 1930 Alberta general election". Alberta Heritage Community Foundation. Instant-runoff voting requires a candidate to receive a plurality (greater than 50%) of the votes. As no candidate received a plurality of votes, the bottom candidate was eliminated and their 2nd place votes were applied to both other candidates until one received a plurality

=== 1935 ===
1935 Alberta general election: Clover Bar
Party	Candidate	Votes	%	±%
Social Credit	Floyd M. Baker	2,503	53.07%	–
Liberal	M. G. Christie	1,105	23.43%	–
United Farmers	D. Roberts	844	17.90%	-19.30%
Conservative	S. Savage	264	5.60%	-18.30%
Total		4,716	–	–
Rejected, spoiled and declined		130	–	–
Eligible electors / turnout		5,636	85.98%	17.07%
Social Credit gain from United Farmers		Swing		N/A%
Source(s) Source: "Clover Bar Official Results 1935 Alberta general election". Alberta Heritage Community Foundation.

=== 1940 ===
1940 Alberta general election: Clover Bar
Party	Candidate	Votes	%	±%
First count
Social Credit	Floyd M. Baker	2,252	44.17%	-8.90%
Co-operative Commonwealth	David Roberts	1,476	28.95%	–
Independent	A. H. Gibson	1,370	14.92%	–
Total		5,098	–	–
Ballot transfer results
Social Credit	Floyd M. Baker	2,418	59.19%	–
Co-operative Commonwealth	David Roberts	1,667	40.81%	–
Total		4,085	–	–
Rejected, spoiled and declined		208	–	–
Eligible electors / turnout		6,814	77.87%	-8.11%
Social Credit hold		Swing		N/A%
Source(s) Source: "Clover Bar Official Results 1940 Alberta general election". Alberta Heritage Community Foundation. Instant-runoff voting requires a candidate to receive a plurality (greater than 50%) of the votes. As no candidate received a plurality of votes, the bottom candidate was eliminated and their 2nd place votes were applied to both other candidates until one received a plurality

=== 1944 ===
1944 Alberta general election: Clover Bar
Party	Candidate	Votes	%	±%
Social Credit	Floyd M. Baker	2,969	63.69%	19.52%
Co-operative Commonwealth	David Roberts	1,693	36.31%	7.36%
Total		4,662	–	–
Rejected, spoiled and declined		53	–	–
Eligible electors / turnout		6,560	71.88%	-5.99%
Social Credit hold		Swing		13.69%
Source(s) Source: "Clover Bar Official Results 1944 Alberta general election". Alberta Heritage Community Foundation.

=== 1948 ===
1948 Alberta general election: Clover Bar
Party	Candidate	Votes	%	±%
Social Credit	Floyd M. Baker	2,801	60.93%	-2.75%
Co-operative Commonwealth	Alfred O. Arntson	1,035	22.51%	-13.80%
Liberal	R. M. MacCrimmon	761	16.55%	–
Total		4,597	–	–
Rejected, spoiled and declined		297	–	–
Eligible electors / turnout		6,985	70.06%	-1.81%
Social Credit hold		Swing		5.52%
Source(s) Source: "Clover Bar Official Results 1948 Alberta general election". Alberta Heritage Community Foundation.

=== 1952 ===
1952 Alberta general election: Clover Bar
Party	Candidate	Votes	%	±%
Social Credit	Floyd M. Baker	2,238	56.77%	-4.16%
Co-operative Commonwealth	Martin Reynolds	935	23.72%	1.20%
Liberal	Joseph R. Sweeney	769	19.51%	2.95%
Total		3,942	–	–
Rejected, spoiled and declined		262	–	–
Eligible electors / turnout		6,354	66.16%	-3.90%
Social Credit hold		Swing		-2.68%
Source(s) Source: "Clover Bar Official Results 1952 Alberta general election". Alberta Heritage Community Foundation.

=== 1955 ===
1955 Alberta general election: Clover Bar
Party	Candidate	Votes	%	±%
First count
Social Credit	Floyd M. Baker	2,314	47.64%	-9.13%
Liberal	Wilfred McLean	1,609	33.13%	13.62%
Co-operative Commonwealth	Martin Reynolds	603	12.42%	-11.30%
Conservative	Andrew M. Adamson	331	6.81%	–
Total		4,857	–	–
Ballot transfer results
Social Credit	Floyd M. Baker	2,505	53.72%	–
Liberal	Wilfred McLean	2,158	46.28%	–
Total		4,663	–	–
Rejected, spoiled and declined		298	–	–
Eligible electors / turnout		7,302	70.60%	4.54%
Social Credit hold		Swing		N/A%
Source(s) Source: "Clover Bar Official Results 1955 Alberta general election". Alberta Heritage Community Foundation. Instant-runoff voting requires a candidate to receive a plurality (greater than 50%) of the votes. As no candidate received a plurality of votes, the bottom candidate was eliminated and their 2nd place votes were applied to both other candidates until one received a plurality

=== 1959 ===
1959 Alberta general election: Clover Bar
Party	Candidate	Votes	%	±%
Social Credit	Floyd M. Baker	3,393	57.87%	10.23%
Progressive Conservative	Andrew M. Adamson	1,225	20.89%	–
Liberal	Roy C. Marler	935	15.95%	-17.18%
Co-operative Commonwealth	Ernest Wilfred Davies	310	5.29%	-7.13%
Total		5,863	–	–
Rejected, spoiled and declined		9	–	–
Eligible electors / turnout		8,610	68.20%	-2.40%
Social Credit hold		Swing		N/A%
Source(s) Source: "Clover Bar Official Results 1959 Alberta general election". Alberta Heritage Community Foundation.

=== 1963 ===
1963 Alberta general election: Clover Bar
Party	Candidate	Votes	%	±%
Social Credit	Floyd M. Baker	3,730	57.71%	-0.16%
Progressive Conservative	Dan. F. Hollands	1,407	21.77%	0.88%
Liberal	James P. O'Dwyer	791	12.24%	-3.71%
New Democratic	Paul Arthur Dorin	535	8.28%	2.99%
Total		6,463	–	–
Rejected, spoiled and declined		7	–	–
Eligible electors / turnout		10,498	61.63%	-6.57%
Social Credit hold		Swing		-0.52%
Source(s) Source: "Clover Bar Official Results 1963 Alberta general election". Alberta Heritage Community Foundation.

=== 1967 ===
1967 Alberta general election: Clover Bar
Party	Candidate	Votes	%	±%
Social Credit	Walter A. Buck	4,101	51.53%	-6.19%
Progressive Conservative	Dan. F. Hollands	2,215	27.83%	6.06%
New Democratic	Alfred O. Arnston	1,175	14.76%	6.49%
Liberal	Kazmer D. Curry	468	5.88%	-6.36%
Total		7,959	–	–
Rejected, spoiled and declined		28	–	–
Eligible electors / turnout		11,979	66.68%	5.04%
Social Credit hold		Swing		-6.12%
Source(s) Source: "Clover Bar Official Results 1967 Alberta general election". Alberta Heritage Community Foundation.

=== 1971 ===
1971 Alberta general election: Clover Bar
Party	Candidate	Votes	%	±%
Social Credit	Walter A. Buck	4,041	49.01%	-2.52%
Progressive Conservative	J. Devereux	3,468	42.06%	14.23%
New Democratic	A. Karvonen	736	8.93%	-5.84%
Total		8,245	–	–
Rejected, spoiled and declined		26	–	–
Eligible electors / turnout		11,532	71.72%	5.05%
Social Credit hold		Swing		-8.37%
Source(s) Source: "Clover Bar Official Results 1971 Alberta general election". Alberta Heritage Community Foundation.

=== 1975 ===
1975 Alberta general election: Clover Bar
Party	Candidate	Votes	%	±%
Social Credit	Walter A. Buck	5,151	55.04%	6.03%
Progressive Conservative	Murray Finnerty	3,211	34.31%	-7.75%
New Democratic	Duncan McArthur	799	8.54%	-0.39%
Liberal	David Cooke	197	2.11%	–
Total		9,358	–	–
Rejected, spoiled and declined		24	–	–
Eligible electors / turnout		14,341	65.42%	-6.30%
Social Credit hold		Swing		6.89%
Source(s) Source: "Clover Bar Official Results 1975 Alberta general election". Alberta Heritage Community Foundation.

=== 1979 ===
1979 Alberta general election: Clover Bar
Party	Candidate	Votes	%	±%
Social Credit	Walter A. Buck	6,033	53.42%	-1.62%
Progressive Conservative	C.G. (Butch) Thomlinson	3,947	34.95%	0.64%
New Democratic	Graham Griffiths	1,102	9.76%	1.22%
Liberal	Alan M. F. Dunn	211	1.87%	-0.24%
Total		11,293	–	–
Rejected, spoiled and declined		N/A	–	–
Eligible electors / turnout		16,985	66.49%	1.07%
Social Credit hold		Swing		-1.13%
Source(s) Source: "Clover Bar Official Results 1979 Alberta general election". Alberta Heritage Community Foundation.

=== 1982 ===
1982 Alberta general election: Clover Bar
Party	Candidate	Votes	%	±%
Independent	Walter A. Buck	6,312	41.49%	–
Progressive Conservative	Sten Berg	5,434	35.72%	0.77%
Western Canada Concept	Sig Jorstad	1,783	11.72%	–
New Democratic	David Morris	1,683	11.06%	1.31%
Total		15,212	–	–
Rejected, spoiled and declined		20	–	–
Eligible electors / turnout		20,859	73.02%	6.54%
Independent gain from Social Credit		Swing		-6.35%
Source(s) Source: "Clover Bar Official Results 1982 Alberta general election". Alberta Heritage Community Foundation.

=== 1986 ===
1986 Alberta general election: Clover Bar
Party	Candidate	Votes	%	±%
Representative	Walter A. Buck	4,795	47.31%	–
Progressive Conservative	Muriel Abdurahman	2,811	27.74%	-7.99%
New Democratic	Ken Robinson	2,085	20.57%	9.51%
Liberal	Barry Shandro	444	4.38%	–
Total		10,135	–	–
Rejected, spoiled and declined		10	–	–
Eligible electors / turnout		16,705	60.73%	-12.29%
Representative gain from Independent		Swing		6.90%
Source(s) Source: "Clover Bar Official Results 1986 Alberta general election". Alberta Heritage Community Foundation.

=== 1989 ===
1989 Alberta general election: Clover Bar
Party	Candidate	Votes	%	±%
Progressive Conservative	Kurt Gesell	3,717	34.56%	6.83%
Liberal	Stephen Lindop	3,533	32.85%	28.47%
New Democratic	W. H. (Skip) Gordon	3,505	32.59%	12.02%
Total		10,755	–	–
Rejected, spoiled and declined		11	–	–
Eligible electors / turnout		17,175	62.68%	1.95%
Progressive Conservative gain from Representative		Swing		-8.93%
Source(s) Source: "Clover Bar Official Results 1989 Alberta general election". Alberta Heritage Community Foundation.

== Plebiscite results ==
=== 1957 liquor plebiscite ===
1957 Alberta liquor plebiscite results: Clover Bar
Question A: Do you approve additional types of outlets for the sale of beer, wine and spirituous liquor subject to a local vote?
Ballot choice	Votes	%
Yes	3,035	67.87%
No	1,437	32.13%
Total votes	4,472	100%
Rejected, spoiled and declined	75	
9,655 eligible electors, turnout 47.10%
Question B2: Should mixed drinking be allowed in beer parlours in Edmonton and the surrounding areas?
Ballot choice	Votes	%
Yes	1,076	88.78%
No	136	11.22%
Total votes	1,212	100%
Rejected, spoiled and declined	35	
2,320 eligible electors, turnout 53.75%

On October 30, 1957, a stand-alone plebiscite was held province wide in all 50 of the then current provincial electoral districts in Alberta. The government decided to consult Alberta voters to decide on liquor sales and mixed drinking after a divisive debate in the legislature. The plebiscite was intended to deal with the growing demand for reforming antiquated liquor control laws.

The plebiscite was conducted in two parts. Question A, asked in all districts, asked the voters if the sale of liquor should be expanded in Alberta, while Question B, asked in a handful of districts within the corporate limits of Calgary and Edmonton, asked if men and women should be allowed to drink together in establishments. Question B was slightly modified depending on which city the voters were in.

Province wide Question A of the plebiscite passed in 33 of the 50 districts while Question B passed in all five districts. Clover Bar voted overwhelmingly in favour of the plebiscite. The district recorded average voter turnout almost being equal to the province wide 46% average.

Clover Bar also voted on question B2 with a number of residents living inside the electoral district within the corporate limits of Edmonton. Residents voted for mixed drinking with a super majority. Turnout for question B was also quite high; Edmonton residents averaged a significantly higher turnout than those who lived outside the city.

Official district returns were released to the public on December 31, 1957. The Social Credit government in power at the time did not consider the results binding. However the results of the vote led the government to repeal all existing liquor legislation and introduce an entirely new Liquor Act.

Municipal districts lying inside electoral districts that voted against the plebiscite were designated Local Option Zones by the Alberta Liquor Control Board and considered effective dry zones. Business owners who wanted a licence had to petition for a binding municipal plebiscite in order to be granted a licence.

== See also ==
- List of Alberta provincial electoral districts
- Canadian provincial electoral districts
