= Floyd M. Baker =

Canadian politician

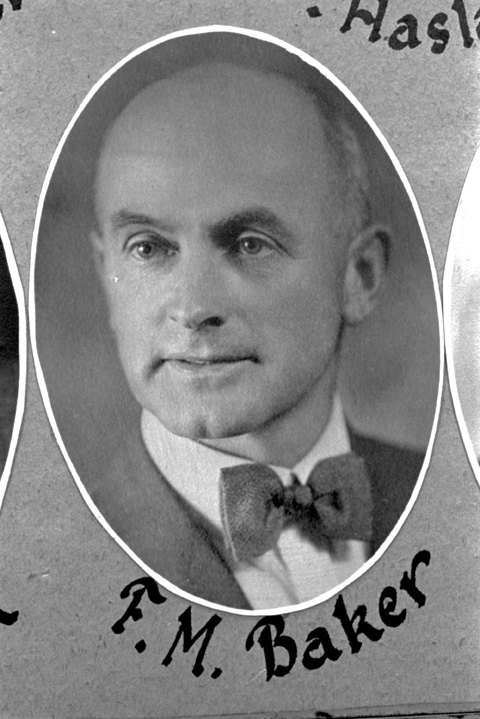

Member of the Legislative Assembly of Alberta
- In office August 22, 1935 – May 23, 1967
- Preceded by: Rudolph Hennig
- Succeeded by: Walt Buck
- Constituency: Clover Bar

Personal details
- Born: Floyd Milton Baker; December 1, 1891; Stevensville, Ontario, Canada
- Died: April 2, 1986 (aged 94); Edmonton, Alberta, Canada
- Political party: Social Credit
- Occupation: politician

Floyd Milton Baker (December 1, 1891 – April 2, 1986) was a provincial politician from Alberta, Canada. He served as a member of the Legislative Assembly of Alberta from 1935 to 1967 sitting with the Social Credit caucus in government.

== Political career ==
Baker ran for a seat to the Alberta Legislature in the 1935 Alberta general election standing as a Social Credit candidate in the electoral district of Clover Bar. He defeated three other candidates easily to pick up the district for his party.

Baker was tasked with managing the by-election campaign for candidate Clarence Tade in a by-election held in the Athabasca riding on November 7, 1938. Tade won the race with a comfortable margin to hold the seat for Social Credit.

The 1940 Alberta general election would see a much closer result. Baker would face a tough three-way race that went into the second vote count. He would edge out Co-operative Commonwealth candidate David Roberts whom he faced for the second election in a row by less than 200 votes to hold his seat.

Baker would face Roberts again in a two-way battle in the 1944 Alberta general election. He would gain some vote share over the last election to hold his seat with a solid majority.

The 1948 Alberta general election would see the opposition vote collapse. Baker would also lose a little bit of his vote share compared to the last election but he would hold his district easily defeating two other candidates to win his fourth term in office.

Baker ran for a fifth term in office in the 1952 Alberta general election. He won a solid majority to return to office defeating two other candidates. Baker continued to lose popular vote share for the second election in a row.

The 1955 Alberta general election saw a hotly contested four-way race. Despite a slight increase in his popular vote Baker was unable to secure a majority. He was returned to office in the third vote count defeating Liberal candidate Wilfred McLean.

Baker ran for a seventh term in office in the 1959 Alberta general election. He faced three other candidates defeating them with a substantial majority to hold his seat.

Baker ran for his eighth and final term in the 1963 Alberta general election. His popularity continued to increase as he was returned to office easily defeating three other candidates.

Baker retired from provincial politics at dissolution of the assembly in 1967.
