= Clayton Sinnott Adams =

American general (1890–1965)

- Born: December 7, 1890; Champaign, Illinois, US
- Died: April 6, 1965 (aged 74)
- Military career
- Allegiance: United States
- Branch: United States Army
- Rank: Brigadier General
- Unit: Army Service Forces
- Commands: Army Postal Service
- Conflicts: World War I World War II
- Awards: Legion of Merit

Clayton Sinnot Adams (December 7, 1890, in Champaign, Illinois – April 6, 1965) was an Adjutant General and Brigadier General during World War II.

== Military career ==
Adams was commissioned in the infantry reserves at Fort Sheridan in 1917. He was called to active duty in September, 1940. Adams served in the Adjutant General's office from 1940 to 1942. In 1942, Adams became a Brigadier General. From 1942 to 1943, he served as the Head of the Army Postal Service. From December 1943 to July 1944, Adams was assigned to the Army Service Forces.

== Awards ==
Adams received the Legion of Merit.

== Death and legacy ==
Adams died on April 4, 1965, and is buried in Arlington National Cemetery.
