= Veterans' and Active Force =

Defunct political party in Alberta, Canada

The Veterans' and Active Force was a one-man political party that was represented in the Legislative Assembly of Alberta, Canada, from 1944 to 1948. It was led by William J. Williams.

Williams, a World War II veteran, ran and managed his own campaign on a platform of promoting veterans' benefits for soldiers who were coming home from the war. He was elected on the 16th and final vote count in the 1944 election in the Edmonton district. His slim election victory resulted from the vote transfer of servicemen, who had voted Social Credit as their first preference.

The service vote was able to be tracked, because veterans and soldiers' were given special ballots. Williams did not seek re-election in 1948, and the Veterans' and Active Force party disappeared with his retirement.

== See also ==
- List of Alberta political parties
