= Alberta Labor Representation League =

- Former provincial party
- Leader: William Irvine
- Dissolved: March 29, 1919
- Merged into: Dominion Labor Party
- Ideology: Social Democracy
- Political position: Left-wing

The Alberta Labor Representation League was a minor provincial political party in Alberta, Canada.

== History ==
The Calgary Labour Representation League was formed and led by prominent Labor activist William Irvine before the 1917 provincial general election. The party was based at the Labor temple in Calgary, Alberta.

The Labor Representation League was small, the party fielded two candidates in the 1917 Alberta general election when Calgary was divided into three districts. Irvine was not successful in defeating Conservative Thomas Blow in the South Calgary electoral district.

Alex Ross, the other LRL candidate in the election, ran in the electoral district of Centre Calgary. The League struck a deal with the Liberals not to run a candidate against Ross, and then in turn the League would not run a candidate in the North Calgary electoral district against Liberal candidate William McCartney Davidson. Both Davidson and Ross were elected to the legislature. Lorne Proudfoot ran in Acadia with backing from both the Non-Partisan League and the LRL.

The League disbanded and became part of the Dominion Labor Party in 1919.

Edmonton labour activists and reformers organized their Labour Representation League, and it too disbanded with the creation of the DLP.
