= 1928 Calgary municipal election =

Canadian combined local ballot in Calgary, Alberta

← 1927	December 12, 1928	1929 →
Elected mayor
TBD

The 1928 Calgary municipal election was held on December 12, 1928 to elect a Commissioner and six Aldermen to sit on Calgary City Council. Along with positions on Calgary City Council, three trustees for the Public School Board, two trustees for the Separate School Board, and three questions put before the voters.

Calgary City Council governed under "Initiative, Referendum and Recall" which is composed of a Mayor, Commissioner and twelve Aldermen all elected to staggered two year terms. Mayor Frederick Ernest Osborne and six Aldermen: Frank Roy Freeze, Thomas Alexander Hornibrook, Frederick Charles Manning, Robert Henry Parkyn, Samuel Stanley Savage, and William Howell Arthur Thomas elected in 1927 continued in their positions.

== Background ==
The election was held under the Single Transferable Voting/Proportional Representation (STV/PR) with the term for candidates being two years.

W.H. Green, a contractor running under the Civic Government Association banner was the only candidate for Council who had never ran for public office before.

== Results ==
=== Commissioner ===
Candidate	Votes	Percent	count
Arthur Garnet Graves	5,756		
John Walker Russell	4,056		

=== Council ===
Quota for election was 1,343.

Party	Candidate	Votes	%	Count	Elected
Independent	Andrew Davison	2,016	%	1st	✓
Dominion Labor	Fred J. White	1,642	%	1st	✓
C.G.A.	Peter Turner Bone	1,458	%	1st	✓
C.G.A.	Harold McGill	1,252	%	3rd	✓
C.G.A.	Eneas Edward McCormick	992	%	5th	✓
Dominion Labor	Edith Patterson	949	%	4th	✓
C.G.A.	W.H. Green	812	%		
Dominion Labor	James E. Worsley	311	%		
Unknown	A.J. Boulter	306	%		
Total valid votes		9,738			

=== Public School Board ===
Candidate	Votes	Percent	count
W.E. Turner	2,688		
Mrs. Norman Hindsley	2,257		
J.D. McAra	2,249		
E.T. Chritchley	1,992		

=== Separate school board ===
Candidate	Votes	Percent	count
C.J. Jones			
Fred Kenny			

== Plebiscites ==
=== Storm sewer ===
Relief and storm sewers bylaw for $380,000. Approval requires two-thirds majority.

- For - 4,109
- Against - 1,149

=== Centre St. paving ===
Paving and widening of Centre Street North for $102,000. Approval requires two-thirds majority.

- For - 3,804
- Against - 1,440

=== Fire hall equipment ===
New equipment for the fire hall for $50,000. Approval requires two-thirds majority.

- For - 3,692
- Against - 1,518

== See also ==
- List of Calgary municipal elections
