= 1930 Calgary municipal election =

Election in Alberta, Canada

← 1929	November 19, 1930	1931 →

The 1930 Calgary municipal election was held on November 19, 1930 to elect a Commissioner and six Aldermen to sit on Calgary City Council. Along with positions on Calgary City Council, three trustees for the Public School Board, two trustees for the Separate School Board, and five questions put before the voters.

Calgary City Council governed under "Initiative, Referendum and Recall" which is composed of a Mayor, Commissioner and twelve Aldermen all elected to staggered two year terms. Mayor Andrew Davison and six Aldermen: Robert Henry Parkyn, Robert Henry Weir, Pansy Louise Pue, Joseph Hope Ross, Samuel Stanley Savage, and Jean Romeo Cyr-Miquelon elected in 1929 continued in their positions.

== Background ==
The election was held under the Single Transferable Voting/Proportional Representation (STV/PR) with the term for candidates being two years.

Aldermanic candidate from East Calgary, William Cummins (1890-1933) nomination papers were refused owing to an ordinance adopted in 1893 which prohibited the proprietor of a saloon or licensed premises from contesting any civic office. Cummins was the owner of the Shamrock Hotel which included a licensed bar. After obtaining legal advice, Cummins withdrew his nomination.

== Results ==
=== Commissioner ===
Candidate	Votes	Percent	count
Arthur Garnet Graves	8,969		
Michael Copps Costello	4,757		

=== Council ===
Quota for election was 1,942.

Party	Candidate	Votes	%	Count	Elected
Dominion Labor	Fred J. White	3,005	%	1st	✓
C.G.A.	Ralph William Patterson	2,817	%	1st	✓
C.G.A.	Wilmont Douglas Milner	1,666	%	3rd	✓
C.G.A.	Charles Edward Carr	1,542	%	6th	✓
C.G.A.	Lloyd Hamilton Fenerty	1,526	%	6th	✓
Dominion Labor	Edith Patterson	1,107	%		
Dominion Labor	John Walker Russell	959	%	6th	✓
Independent	William George Southern	415	%		
Independent	E.J. Attwood	363	%		
Communist	F.G. Bray	190	%		
Total valid votes		13,590			

=== Public School Board ===
The quota was 3,053

Candidate	Votes	Percent	count
John D. McAra	4,369	1st	
Gartrude Hindsley	4,210	1st	
Wright	1,956		
W.F. Howard	1,795		

=== Separate school board ===
Candidate	Votes	Percent	count
Fred Kenny			

== Plebiscites ==
=== 25th avenue bridge ===
25th Avenue Bridge for $130,000. Approval requires two-thirds majority.

- For - 3,080
- Against - 3,681

=== Swimming pools ===
Construction of three swimming pools for $90,000. Approval requires two-thirds majority.

- For - 3,283
- Against - 3,485

=== Nurses's home ===
Nurses home for $60,000. Approval requires two-thirds majority.

- For - 2,309
- Against - 4,385

=== Payment of Aldermen ===
Salaries for Aldermen of $300 per year. Approval requires two-thirds majority.

- For - 4,000
- Against - 7,977

=== Firemen's hours ===
Firemen's hours providing one day off per week. Approval requires two-thirds majority. The proposition failed for the second year in a row.

- For - 5,217
- Against - 6,827

== See also ==
- List of Calgary municipal elections
