= 1934 Calgary municipal election =

Municipal election in Calgary

← 1933	November 21, 1934	1935 →
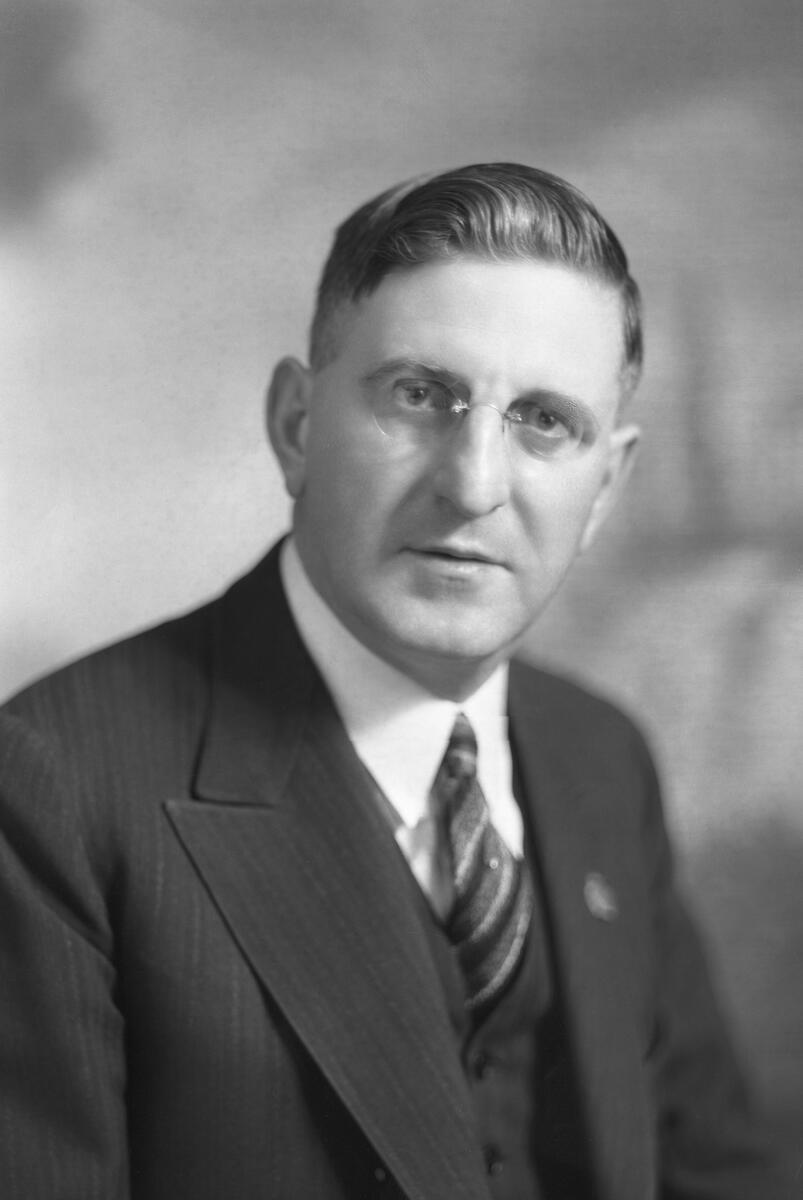
Candidate	Andrew Davison
Popular vote	Continuing in Office
Mayor before election
Andrew Davison
Elected mayor
Andrew Davison

The 1934 Calgary municipal election was held on November 21, 1934 to elect six Aldermen to sit on Calgary City Council. Along with positions on Calgary City Council, a Commissioner, three trustees for the Public School Board, and two trustees for the Separate School Board. Nominations closed on November 5, 1934.

Calgary City Council governed under "Initiative, Referendum and Recall" which is composed of a Mayor, Commissioner and twelve Aldermen all elected to staggered two year terms. Mayor Andrew Davison and six Aldermen: Joseph Brown Seymour, Alexander John MacMillan, William George Southern, Joseph Hope Ross, Harold William Hounsfield Riley and Robert Henry Weir elected in 1933 continued in their positions.

== Background ==
The election was held under the Single Transferable Voting/Proportional Representation (STV/PR) with the term for candidates being two years.

The Great Depression played a significant role in the 1934 election as many Calgarians were out of work. A candidate meeting at the Elks Lodge was interrupted by a relief worker who was subsequently arrested by police. Members of the crowd surged towards the gallery in defense of the worker forcing Mayor Davison to end the meeting when he realized order could not be restored.

The Calgary Herald advocated on behalf of the Civic Government Association prior to the election arguing that Labour Aldermen and trustees had failed to effectively run the city.

== Results ==
Results from Calgary Daily Herald.

=== Commissioner ===
Candidate	Votes	Percent
Thomas B. Riley	11,063	
James T. Burns	8,003	
Arthur Garnet Graves	4,210	
C.W. Reese	1,436	
Fred Nutt	374	

=== Council ===
Quota for election was 3,286.

Party	Candidate	Votes	%	Count	Elected
C.G.A.	William Ayer Lincoln	4,336	%	1st	✓
Dominion Labor	Fred J. White	4,122	%	1st	✓
C.G.A.	Frank Roy Freeze	2,930	%		✓
Independent	Robert Henry Parkyn	2,875	%		✓
Dominion Labor	Aylmer John Eggert Liesemer	2,288	%		✓
C.G.A.	Douglas Cunnington	1,956	%		✓
C.G.A.	Pansy Louise Pue	2,026	%		
Communist	Patrick Douglas Lenihan	1,198	%		
C.G.A.	Peter Turner Bone	1,141	%		
Independent	Donald McPherson	800	%		
Dominion Labor	Fred F. McNeill	681	%		
Dominion Labor	Charles K. Vernon	619	%		
Communist	Lawrence Anderson	74	%		
Total valid votes					

=== Public School Board ===
The quota was 3,053

Candidate	Votes	Percent	count
A.B. Singleton	5,673		
Robert Thomas Alderman	5,037		
Arthur D. Cumming	3,325		
Ernest Henry Starr	2,473		
A.T. Spankie	2,463		
J.H. Doughty-Davies	2,031		
Murdoch Clarke	1,296		

=== Separate school board ===
Candidate	Votes	Percent	count
Fred Kenny			
Fred Kennedy			
C.J. Jones			
J.F. Maloney			
Fred Peat			
Bert Ryan			
Charles Thomas			

== Plebiscites ==
=== Material for Works Program ===
Material for works program for unemployed.

- For - 3,395
- Against - 4,634

=== City manager ===
An appointed city manager.

- For - 10,458
- Against - 12,798

== See also ==
- List of Calgary municipal elections
