= 1931 Calgary municipal election =

Election in Alberta, Canada

← 1930	November 18, 1931	1932 →
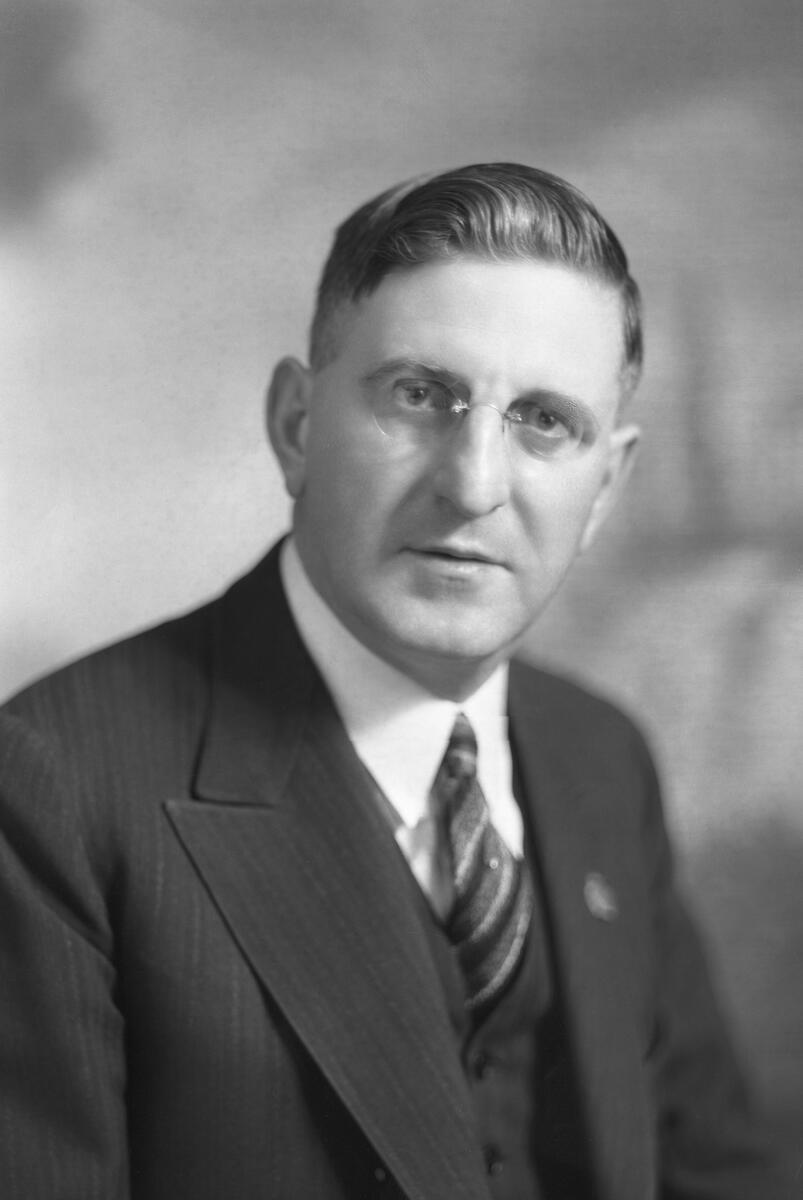
		C
Candidate	Andrew Davison	Phil Luck
Party	Independent	Communist
Popular vote	17,324	1,028
Percentage	94.40%	5.60%
Mayor before election
Andrew Davison
Elected mayor
Andrew Davison

The 1931 Calgary municipal election was held on November 18, 1931 to elect a Mayor and six Aldermen to sit on Calgary City Council. Along with positions on Calgary City Council, four trustees for the Public School Board, three trustees for the Separate School Board, and three questions put before the voters. Calgary City Council was composed of a Mayor, a Commissioner and twelve Aldermen who were elected to staggered two year terms. The Council served under the rules of "Direct Legislation", subject to citizen's rights to "Initiative, Referendum and Recall".

Mayor Andrew Davison, the sitting mayor was running for re-election. Six Aldermen - Lloyd Hamilton Fenerty, Ralph William Patterson, John Walker Russell, Wilmot Douglas Milner, Fred J. White, and Charles Edward Carr - who had been elected in 1930, continued in their positions.

== Background ==
The election was held under the Single Transferable Voting/Proportional Representation (STV/PR) with the term for aldermen being two years.

Incumbent Mayor Andrew Davison was challenged by Communist candidate Phil Luck, who garnered only 5.6 per cent of the popular vote. Luck expected to have greater support amongst foreign born residents. However the Calgary Herald reported a large number of resident aliens were refused the right to vote because they failed to provide naturalization papers or birth certificates.

== Results ==
=== Mayor ===
Candidate	Votes	Percent
Andrew Davison	17,324	94.40%
Phil Luck	1,028	5.60%

=== Council ===
Quota for election was 2,611.

Party	Candidate	Votes	%	Count	Elected
Independent	Samuel Stanley Savage	3,257	%	1st	✓
C.G.A.	Robert Henry Weir	2,798	%	1st	✓
C.G.A.	Harold William Hounsfield Riley	2,144	%	3rd	✓
C.G.A.	Jean Romeo Cyr-Miquelon	1,880	%	9th	✓
C.G.A.	Pansy Louise Pue	1,708	%	9th	✓
Dominion Labor	Edith Patterson	1,509	%	9th	✓
Independent	William Cummins	1,137	%		
Dominion Labor	William Howell Arthur Thomas	1,089	%		
Dominion Labor	William George Southern	775	%		
Independent	Harry Humble	762	%		
Communist	John O'Sullivan	459	%		
Independent	Teddy Attwood	375	%		
Communist	Matthew Smith	340	%		
Total valid votes		18,233			

=== Public School Board ===
Electing four trustees. The quota was 3,053

Amelia Turner was elected, received 4670 votes in first round of counting.

A.B. Singleton was elected, received 3996 votes in first round of counting.

F.E. Spooner was elected, received 3423 votes after transfers.

A.C. Newcombe was elected, received 2762 votes after transfers.

R.H. Berry received 1156 votes in first round of counting or after transfers.

=== Separate school board ===
Candidate	Votes	Percent	count
John Burns	871		
R. McGuiness	394		
P.V. Burgard	341		
McKernan	287		

== Plebiscites ==
=== City manager ===
Reorganization of civic government, on whether a City Manager would be hired to take on the role of the current elected Commissioner.

- For - 776
- Against - 4,172

=== 25th avenue bridge ===
25th Avenue Bridge for $45,000.

- For - 2,845
- Against - 652

=== Arterial highway paving ===
Arterial highway paving for $212,000.

- For - 3,098
- Against - 396

== See also ==
- List of Calgary municipal elections
