= John Chantler McDougall =

Canadian Methodist missionary

The Reverend John McDougall
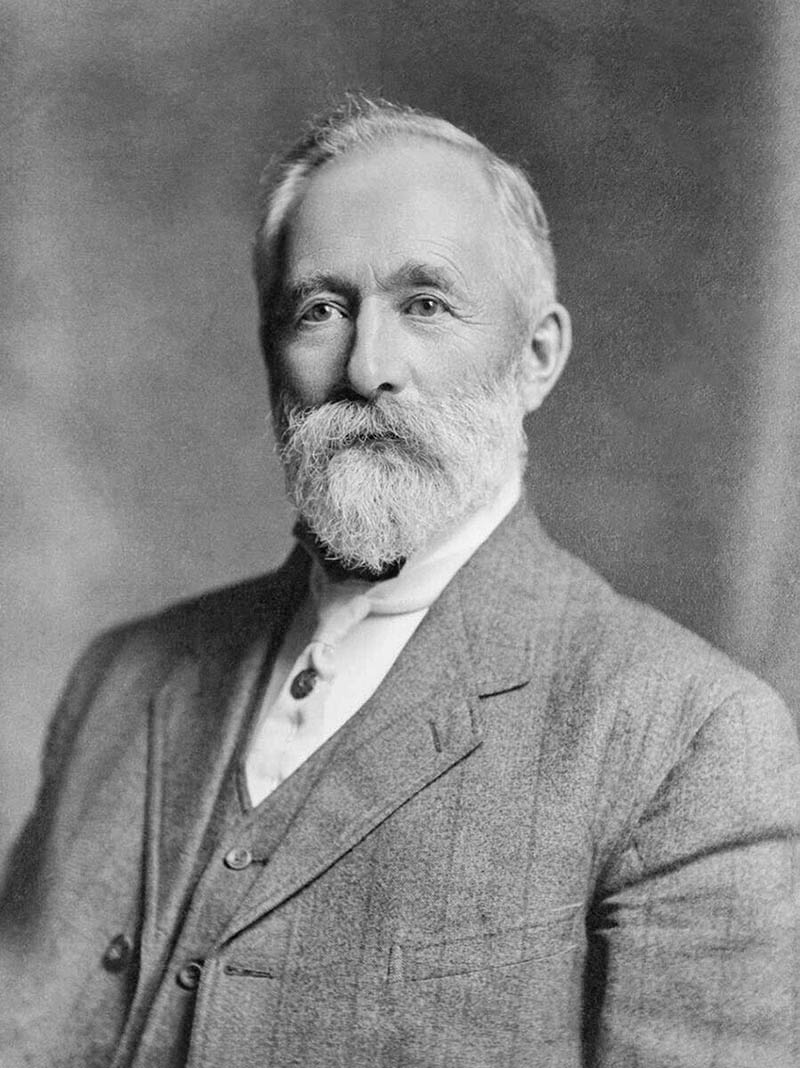
- Reverend John McDougall, circa 1915
- Born: December 27, 1842; Sydenham, Canada West
- Died: January 15, 1917 (aged 74); Calgary, Alberta
- Occupation: Methodist clergyman

John Chantler McDougall (1842–1917) was a missionary, civil servant and published author in Alberta, Canada.

== Personal life ==
John McDougall was born in 1842 in Sydenham, Upper Canada. He moved west with his father George Millward McDougall to the boreal forest trading post of Norway House in 1860. He followed in his father's footsteps and did missionary work in the western Prairies. He worked for multiple governments on First Nations issues over the years and worked with Native leaders to lobby governments to improve conditions for their people, such as travelling with Little Bear to Ottawa in 1897.

== Political involvement ==
McDougall ran for a seat in the Legislative Assembly of Alberta in the 1913 Alberta general election under the Alberta Liberal banner in the electoral district of Centre Calgary. He was soundly defeated by Thomas Tweedie.

At the time of his death in 1917, he was working in Calgary enforcing Prohibition, a cause he fully endorsed. A newspaper described him as "a Methodist, but broadly Christian, independent and radical in politics, an intense democrat, and aggressive and liberal in all his views. He had been giving strong support to the People's Forum, an organization in which he was keenly interested." The People's Forum was organized by prominent leftist Albertan William Irvine.
