= Balaclava, Ontario =

Balaclava, Ontario may refer to:

- Balaclava, Grey County, Ontario
- Balaclava, Renfrew County, Ontario
