= 1935 Calgary municipal election =

Election in Alberta, Canada

- November 20, 1935
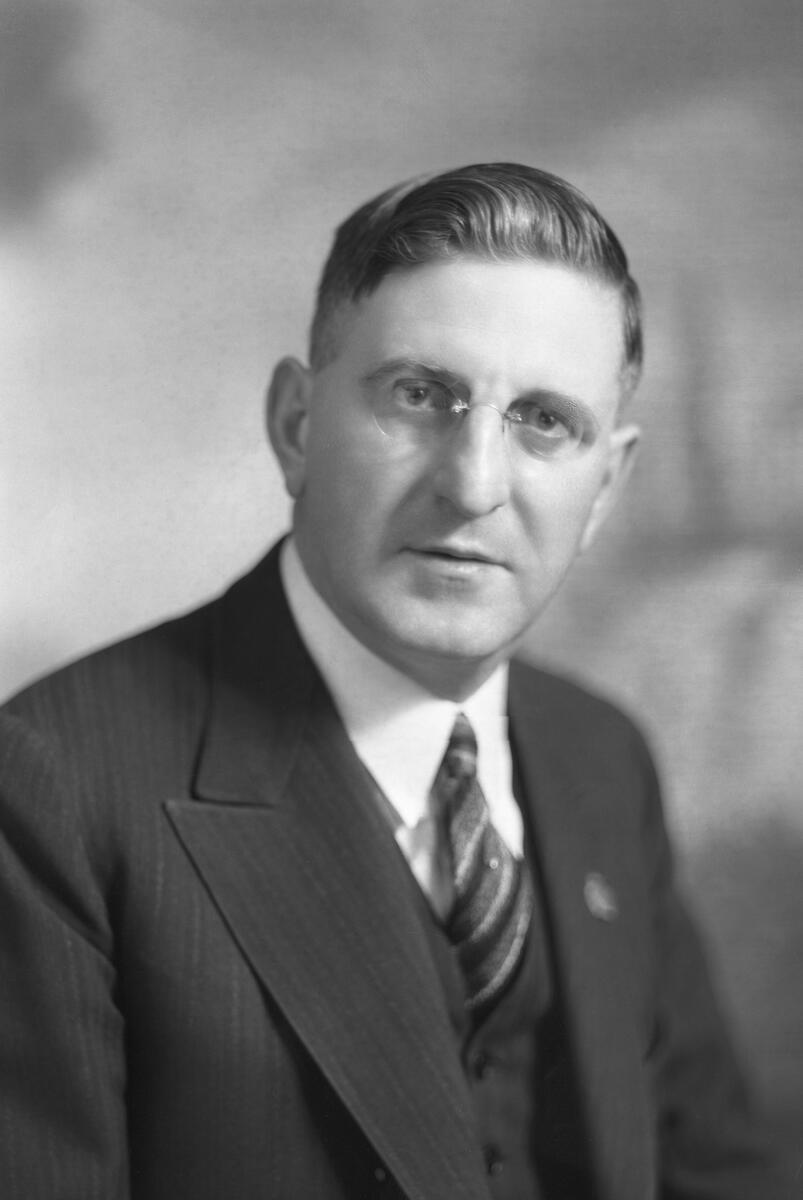

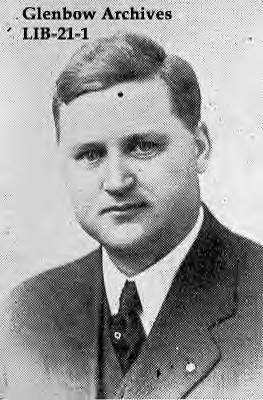
		W.H.
Candidate	Andrew Davison	Walter Reginald Herbert	Fred J. White
Party	Independent	Social Credit	Labor
Popular vote	13,011	10,956	3,013
Percentage	47.95%	40.38%	11.10%
Mayor before election
Andrew Davison
Elected mayor
Andrew Davison

The 1935 Calgary municipal election was held on November 20, 1935, to elect a Mayor and six Aldermen to sit on Calgary City Council. Along with positions on Calgary City Council, three trustees for the Public School Board, and three trustees for the Separate School Board were elected. Nominations closed on November 4, 1935.

Calgary City Council was composed of a Mayor, Commissioner and twelve Aldermen, each elected to staggered two year terms. Initiative, Referendum, Recall, and proportional representation were in practice at this time.

Mayor Andrew Davison and six Aldermen: Douglas Cunnington, Frank Roy Freeze, William Ayer Lincoln, Robert Henry Parkyn, and Aylmer John Eggert Liesemer elected in 1934 continued in their positions.

A total of 29,194 votes were cast in the mayoral contest.

== Electoral system ==
The election used instant-runoff voting for the election of the mayor.

The election used Single Transferable Voting/Proportional Representation (STV/PR) to elect the six city councillors in a city-wide district.

The term for elected members was two years.

== Background ==
W. R. Herbert contested the Mayor's seat for the Social Credit Party, which successfully swept the Legislative Assembly months earlier in the 1935 Alberta general election. Social Credit Premier William Aberhart had previously stated that he did not favour the Social Credit party entering municipal politics. During the campaign it came to light that Herbert's business "Herbert Pain and Varnish Co., Ltd." was in three years in arrears for business tax and water service, however, Herbert was not disqualified.

Alderman Fred J. White resigned halfway through his two-year term to content the Mayor's seat.

== Results ==
Results from Calgary Daily Herald.

=== Mayor ===
Candidate	Initial votes	Percent
Andrew Davison (Independent Movement)	13,011	47.95%
W. R. Herbert (Social Credit)	10,956	40.38%
Fred J. White (Labour Party)	3,013	11.10%
Fred Peat	152	0.56%

Least popular candidates were eliminated, their votes transferred, and Davison eventually accumulated a majority of votes to win the seat.

=== Council ===
Quota for election was 3,313.

Party	Candidate	Votes	%	Count	Elected
C.G.A.	Alexander John MacMillan	3,519	%		✓
C.G.A.	Douglas Cameron Sinclair	2,787	%		✓
Dominion Labor	William George Southern	2,299	%		✓
Social Credit	James William Gillman	1,731	%		✓
Social Credit	Rose Wilkinson	1,778	%		✓
Social Credit	James Gourley	1,586	%		✓
C.G.A.	Robert Henry Weir	1,505	%		✓
Social Credit	D.W. Mitchell	1,929	%		
C.G.A.	George Lancaster	1,469	%		
Social Credit	G.W. Walters	1,409	%		
Social Credit	F.A. Battisto	1,229	%		
Social Credit	G.W. Edmunds	954	%		
Communist	Murdoch Clarke	511	%		
Dominion Labor	Charles K. Vernon	315	%		
Independent	E.D. Battrum	259	%		
Dominion Labor	A.T. Pippard	212	%		
Dominion Labor	Joseph Sykes	148	%		
Total valid votes					

=== Public School Board ===
The quota was 3,053

Candidate	Votes	Percent	count
E.J. Chambers	5,684		
Amelia Turner	3,608		
J.S. McMurchy	3,389		
Mrs. D.A. Anderson	3354		
C.R. Pearce	2,713		
James L. Cromarty	2,034		
Arthur Craig	2,015		
P.L. Brooks	864		
Kay Rankin	539		

=== Separate school board ===
Candidate	Votes	Percent	count
P.V. Burgard	625		
Roland McGuinness	561		
Patrick Cregan	407		
C.J. Jones	477		
L.L. Plotkins	179		

== See also ==
- List of Calgary municipal elections
