= Thomas Tweedie =

Canadian politician

The Honourable Thomas Mitchell March Tweedie KC
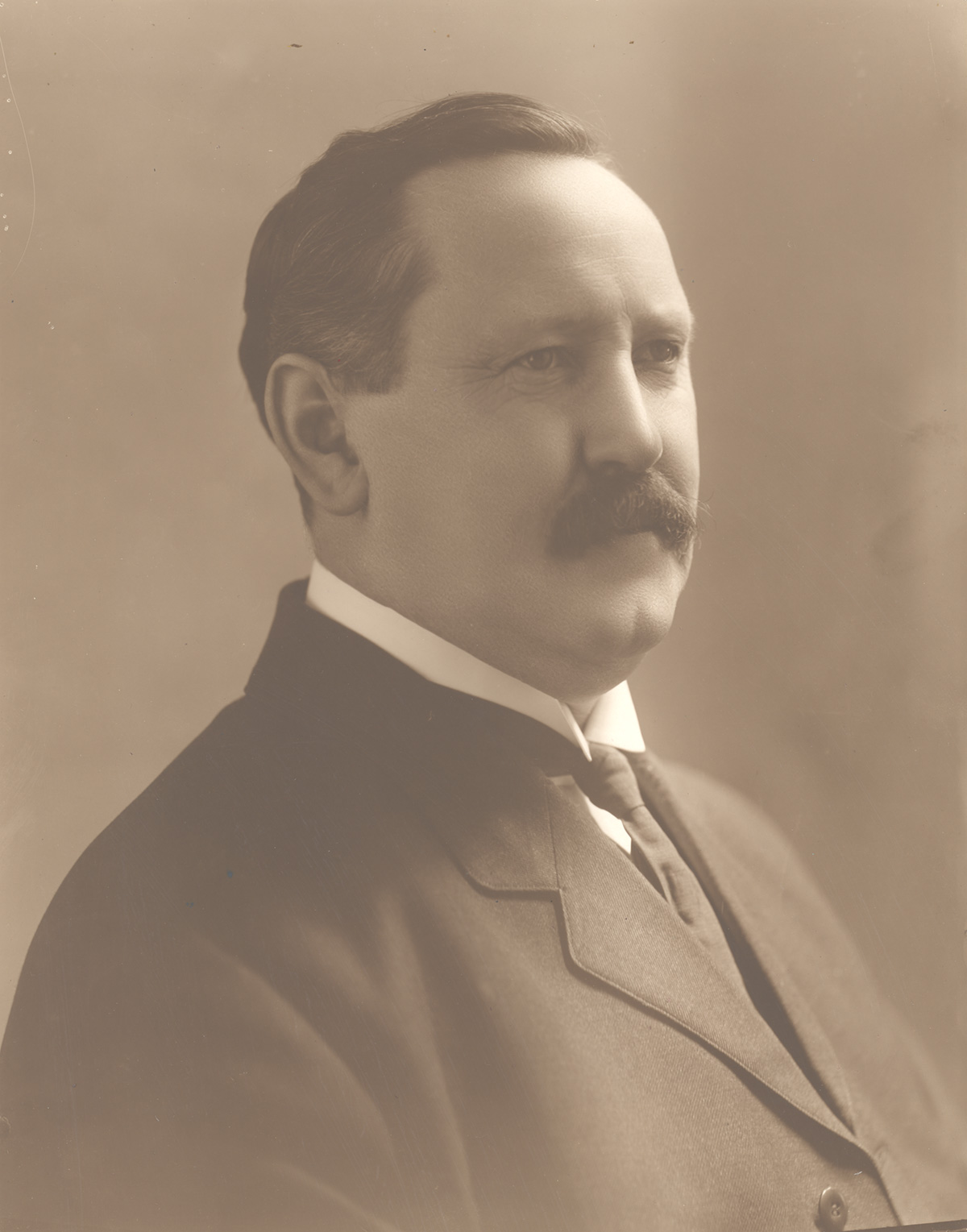

Member of Parliament of Canada for Calgary West
- In office 17 December 1917 – 5 December 1921

Member of the Legislative Assembly of Alberta for Calgary (1911–1913) Centre Calgary (1913–1917)
- In office 31 October 1911 – 6 June 1917

Personal details
- Born: 4 March 1871 River John, Nova Scotia
- Died: 4 October 1944 (aged 73) Lethbridge, Alberta
- Party: Conservative (Provincial); Unionist (Federal)
- Education: Mount Allison University; Harvard University
- Occupation: lawyer, judge

Thomas Mitchell March Tweedie KC (4 March 1871 – 4 October 1944) was a Canadian politician, lawyer and chief justice in Alberta, Canada.

== Early life ==
Tweedie was born in River John, Nova Scotia, on 4 March 1871, to James Tweedie a Methodist Minister, and his wife Rachael Susannah. He graduated from Mount Allison University with a Bachelor of Arts in 1902 and subsequently entered Harvard University, where he earned a law degree in 1905. He was admitted to the bar in Nova Scotia in 1905, and then moved to Alberta where he would be one of the last individuals admitted to the bar in the Northwest Territories on 10 July 1907. Settling in Calgary, he would begin to practice law with future MLA Alexander McGillivray, and was named King's Counsel on 19 March 1913.

== Provincial career ==
Tweedie was first elected to the Legislative Assembly of Alberta in a 1911 by-election and served the Calgary seat that had been previously vacated by Richard Bennett. In this elected he ran under the Conservative banner. Tweedie defeated popular municipal alderman Thomas Skinner who ran as a Liberal candidate.

Tweedie was re-elected to his second term in the 1913 Alberta general election. The Calgary riding was broken up into 3 different ridings under the redistribution bill passed by the Sifton government. Thomas ran in the new riding of Centre Calgary. He won his second term in the legislature with a large margin defeating Liberal candidate John McDougall.

In the 1917 Alberta general election he ran for re-election in Calgary Centre, this time being defeated by Alex Ross who ran as a Labor candidate. Thomas would quickly make the jump to federal politics running in the federal election later that year.

== Federal career ==
After Thomas lost his seat in the 1917 provincial election, he attempted a run at federal politics. Thomas ran as a Unionist member in the new Calgary West federal riding during the 1917 federal election. He won a comfortable victory and served as the first Member of Parliament for the riding in the coalition government.

Thomas served most of his first in term parliament, until he vacated his seat on 14 October 1921, after he was appointed as a Justice to the Bench.

== Judicial career ==
Thomas was appointed as a judge to the Supreme Court of Alberta Trial Division in Calgary on 15 September 1921 and subsequently resigned his seat in the House of Commons. He served as a justice for 23 years, where he was known for his judgements on civil actions including contracts, bankruptcies, and torts, before being appointed as a Chief justice on 16 August 1944. Tweedie's reputation as a popular and well respected legal mind would be somewhat tarnished after his involvement assisting the Alberta Minister of Public Works Oran McPherson with his divorce in 1932. Tweedie would hold court in the judge's library in Edmonton to expedite the process, and when McPherson's wife challenged the divorce, the matter ended up in front of the Privy Council.

He would die a short time later on 4 October 1944, after attending a dinner in his honour hosted by the Lethbridge Bar Association at the age of 73.

Legislative Assembly of Alberta
Preceded by Richard Bennett	MLA Calgary; 1911–1913	Succeeded by Alex Ross; Robert Edwards; Fred J. White; Robert Marshall; Robert Pearson
Preceded by New District	MLA Centre Calgary; 1913–1917	Succeeded by Alex Ross
Parliament of Canada
Preceded by New District	Member of Parliament Calgary West; 1917–1921	Succeeded by Joseph Tweed Shaw
