= 1932 Calgary municipal election =

Election in Alberta, Canada

← 1931	November 23, 1932	1933 →
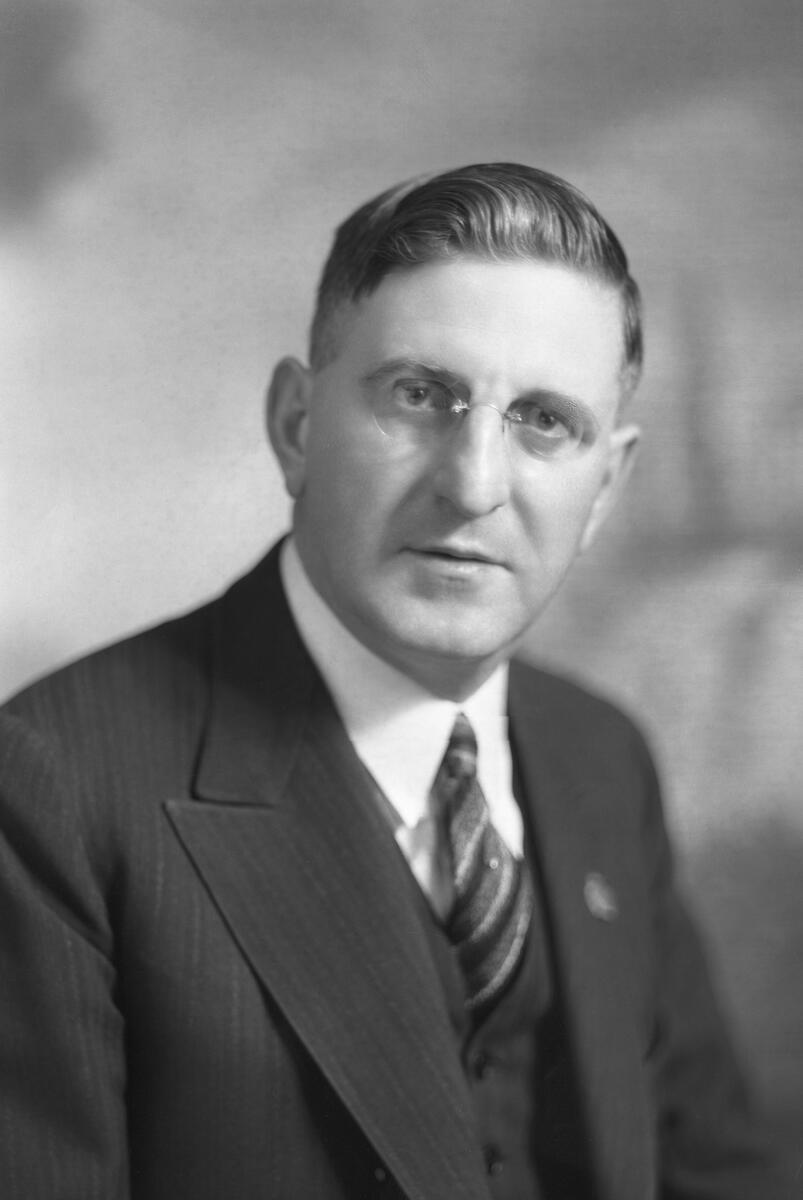
Candidate	Andrew Davison
Popular vote	Continuing in Office
Mayor before election
Andrew Davison
Elected mayor
Andrew Davison

The 1932 Calgary municipal election was held on November 23, 1932 to elect seven Aldermen to sit on Calgary City Council. Along with positions on Calgary City Council, a Commissioner, three trustees for the Public School Board, and two trustees for the Separate School Board.

Calgary City Council governed under "Initiative, Referendum and Recall" which is composed of a Mayor, Commissioner and twelve Aldermen all elected to staggered two year terms. Mayor Andrew Davison and six Aldermen: Harold William Hounsfield Riley, Jean Romeo Cyr-Miquelon, Samuel Stanley Savage, Pansy Louise Pue, and Robert Henry Weir elected in 1931 continued in their positions.

Edith Patterson who was elected in 1931 resigned from Calgary City Council on November 7, 1932.

== Background ==
The election was held under the Single Transferable Voting/Proportional Representation (STV/PR) with the term for candidates being two years. Calgary had an estimated 53,000 eligible voters.

Arthur Garnet Graves who had served as Commissioner prior to the election spent much of the campaign denying rumors he owned shares of businesses in the city and an estate in England. At nomination day, the Calgary Daily Herald editorial board supported Graves candidacy for Commissioner owing to his experience in the role and Riley's lack of civic experience.

== Results ==
Results from Calgary Daily Herald.

=== Commissioner ===
Candidate	Votes	Percent
Thomas B. Riley	9,747	
Arthur Garnet Graves	6,828	
Phil Luck	596	

=== Council ===
Quota for election was 2,140.

Party	Candidate	Votes	%	Count	Elected
Independent	Harry Humble	3,134	%	1st	✓
Dominion Labor	Fred J. White	2,209	%	1st	✓
Independent	Robert Henry Parkyn	1,636	%	5th	✓
C.G.A.	William Ayer Lincoln	1,618	%	9th	✓
C.G.A.	George D. Venini	1,431	%		
Independent	Joseph Hope Ross	1,248	%	9th	✓
C.G.A.	Peter Turner Bone	1,208	%	12th	✓
Dominion Labor	John Walker Russell	1,133	%	12th	✓
Dominion Labor	Joseph Allen	854	%		
C.G.A.	H.D. Mann	736	%		
Dominion Labor	William George Southern	633	%		
C.G.A.	Mrs. B.E. Canniff	613	%		
Dominion Labor	J.E. Worsley	377	%		
Communist	Murdoch Clarke	289	%		
Total valid votes					

=== Public School Board ===
The quota was 3,053

Candidate	Votes	Percent	count
A.T. Spankie	3,187		
Ernest Henry Starr	2,839		
Robert Thomas Alderman	2,358		
John Tully	2,522		
Harry Pryde	2,003		
Alex Milligan	1,567		
John O'Sullivan	675		

=== Separate school board ===
Candidate	Votes	Percent	count
Fred Kenny			
C.V. Jones			

== See also ==
- List of Calgary municipal elections
