= Centre Calgary =

Defunct provincial electoral district in Alberta, Canada

Coordinates: 51.05°N 114.06°W

Alberta electoral district

Defunct provincial electoral district
- Legislature: Legislative Assembly of Alberta
- District created: 1913
- District abolished: 1921
- First contested: 1913
- Last contested: 1917

Centre Calgary was a provincial electoral district in Calgary, Alberta, Canada, mandated to return a single member to the Legislative Assembly of Alberta using the first past the post method of voting from 1913 to 1921.

== History ==
The Centre Calgary electoral district was formed in 1913 from Calgary (provincial electoral district) and abolished in 1921 and once again became part of the Calgary provincial electoral district.

=== Boundary history ===
Centre Calgary 1913 boundaries
Bordering districts
North	East	West	South
Cochrane	North Calgary	South Calgary	South Calgary
Legal description from the Statutes of Alberta 1913, An Act to Amend the Act respecting the Legislative Assembly of Alberta.
riding map goes here		map in relation to other districts in Calgary goes here	
Centre Calgary.—Commencing at the intersection of the meridian line between ranges 1 and 2, west of the 5th meridian, being the western boundary of the city limits of the City of Calgary and the centre line of the main line of the Canadian Pacific Railway; thence generally east and southeast along the said main line of the Canadian Pacific Railway to the point of its intersection with the centre line of the Bow River in the south-east quarter of section 1, township 24, range 1, west of the 5th meridian; thence generally north and west along the said centre line of the Bow River to the point of its intersection with the meridian, being the western boundary of the city limits of the City of Calgary; thence south along said western boundary of the city limits of the City of Calgary to the point of commencement.
Note: Boundaries came into force in 1913 and lasted until the district was abolished.

Members of the Legislative Assembly for Centre Calgary
Assembly	Years	Member	Party
See Calgary electoral district from 1905-1913
3rd	1913–1917	Thomas Tweedie	Conservative
4th	1917–1919	Alex Ross	Labor Representation
4th	1919–1921	Alex Ross	Dominion Labor
See Calgary electoral district from 1921-1959

=== Electoral history ===
The Centre Calgary provincial electoral district was created in 1913 as part of a contentious re-distribution of boundaries that saw the city of Calgary divided up into three electoral districts. The other two electoral districts were North Calgary and South Calgary.

Conservative candidate Thomas Tweedie won the Centre Calgary's first election held in 1913. He was part of a Conservative sweep of the city that year. The Conservatives had a wave of support due to the unpopularity of the Sifton government in power at the time.

Thomas Tweedie was defeated in a stunning upset by the Calgary Labor temple member Alex Ross. Ross held the electoral district until it was abolished in 1921, as Calgary was reformed into a five-member seat.

== Legislative election results ==
=== 1913 ===
1913 Alberta general election
Party	Candidate	Votes	%
Conservative	Thomas Tweedie	1,564	68.24%
Liberal	John Chantler McDougall	728	31.76%
Source(s) Source: "Calgary (Centre) Official Results 1913 Alberta general election". Alberta Heritage Community Foundation.

=== 1917 ===
1917 Alberta general election
Party	Candidate	Votes	%	±%
Dominion Labor	Alex Ross	1,328	51.06%	–
Conservative	Thomas Tweedie	1,273	48.94%	-19.29%
Total		2,601	–	–
Rejected, spoiled and declined		N/A	–	–
Eligible electors / turnout		4,701	55.33%	–
Dominion Labor gain from Conservative		Swing		-17.18%
Source(s) Source: "Calgary (Centre) Official Results 1917 Alberta general election". Alberta Heritage Community Foundation. Alex Ross was a member of the Alberta Labor Representation League which would merge with Dominion Labor Party in 1919.

== See also ==
- List of Alberta provincial electoral districts
- Canadian provincial electoral districts
