= 1927 Calgary municipal election =

Election in Alberta, Canada

- December 14, 1927
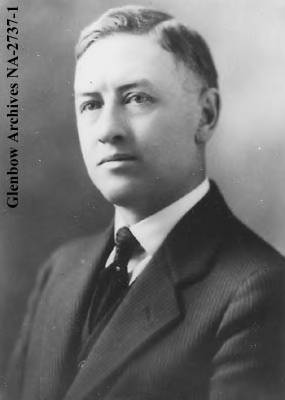
Candidate	Frederick Ernest Osborne
Popular vote	Acclaimed
Mayor before election
Frederick Ernest Osborne
Civic Government Association
Elected mayor
Frederick Ernest Osborne
Civic Government Association

The 1927 Calgary municipal election was held on December 14, 1927, to elect a Mayor and six Aldermen to sit on Calgary City Council. Along with positions on Calgary City Council, four trustees for the Public School Board and four questions were put before the voters.

Calgary City Council governed under "Initiative, Referendum and Recall" which is composed of a Mayor, Commissioner and twelve Aldermen all elected to staggered two year terms. Commissioner Arthur Garnet Graves and six Aldermen: Eneas Edward McCormick, Edith Patterson, Harold McGill, John Walker Russell, Reuben Weldon Ward, and Peter Turner Bone elected in 1926 continued in their positions.

Mayor Frederick Ernest Osborne was acclaimed on close of nominations on December 7, 1928.

== Background ==
The election was held under the Single Transferable Voting/Proportional Representation (STV/PR) with the term for candidates being two years.

Former Calgary Mayor John William Mitchell contested the Aldermanic election as an Independent, however he fell just short of returning to council.

== Results ==
=== Council ===
Quota for election was 1,343.

Party	Candidate	Votes	%	Count	Elected
Civic Government Association	Frank Roy Freeze	1,895	%	1st	✓
Independent Labor	Robert H. Parkyn	1,569	%	1st	✓
Civic Government Association	Frederick C. Manning	1,338	%	2nd	✓
Civic Government Association	Thomas Alexander Hornibrook	1,262	%	2nd	✓
Civic Government Association	Samuel Stanley Savage	866	%	9th	✓
Labour	William Howell Arthur Thomas	668	%	10th	✓
Independent	John William Mitchell	521	%		
Dominion Labor	James E. Worsley	447	%		
Dominion Labor	Mary A. Wright	375	%		
Dominion Labor	Andrew Graham Broatch	331	%		
Dominion Labor	William F. Dorward	125	%		
Total valid votes		8,729			

=== Public School Board ===
Candidate	Votes	Percent	Round in which declared elected
O.H. Patrick	2,264		1st
Thomas B. Riley	1,842		1st
Amelia Turner	1,739		2nd
Fred E. Spooner	1,474		5th
R.J. Hutchings	1,335		
George W. Walters	305		

=== Separate school board ===
Candidate	Votes	Percent	count
P.G. Burgard	Acclaimed		
John Burns	Acclaimed		
A.J. McMillan	Acclaimed		

== Plebiscites ==
=== Storm sewer ===
Construction of storm sewers at a cost of $127,000. Approval requires two-thirds majority.

- For - 3,003
- Against - 1,774

=== Centre St. vote ===
Widening of Centre Street at a cost of $20,000. Approval requires two-thirds majority.

- For - 3,126
- Against - 1,586

=== Clinic vote ===
Continuation of the present clinic system. Approval requires two-thirds majority.

- For - 6,357
- Against - 2,252

=== School vote ===
For the erection of two new high schools at a cost of $500,000. Approval requires majority.

- For - 2,568
- Against - 2,078

== See also ==
- List of Calgary municipal elections

== Sources ==
- "Counting Votes for Candidates for City Council". Calgary Herald. No. 5161. December 15, 1927. p. 1.
