= True Confessions (magazine) =

American confession magazine

- Issue cover dated February 1951
- Categories: Women's magazine
- Frequency: Monthly
- Founded: 1922
- Company: True Renditions LLC
- Country: USA
- Language: English
- Website: www.truerenditionsllc.com
- ISSN: 0041-3488

True Confessions is a confession magazine targeted at young women readers. It was originally published by Fawcett Publications, beginning in 1922.

== History ==
Building on the success of Captain Billy's Whiz Bang magazine, Fawcett Publications published the first issue of True Confessions in August 1922. With a cover price of 25 cents, the front cover of the October, 1922, issue heralded, "Our Thousand Dollar Prize Winner—'All Hell Broke Loose'." During the 1920s, Jack Smalley was the editor, and early issues in the run sometimes featured cover illustrations by Norman Saunders.

Directed at a female readership between the ages of 20 and 35, the magazine climbed to a circulation of two million during the 1930s, carrying such articles as "The Romantic Story of Jack Dempsey's Cinderella Bride." With True Confessions Fawcett was in competition with rival publishers Macfadden (True Story, True Romance, Experiences) and Hillman Periodicals (Real Story, Real Confessions, Real Romances, Crime Confessions). In 1945, Fawcett learned that 72% of the women who read True Confessions were married, just one piece of information gleaned after Fawcett spent $50,000 for a year-long survey involving 600 questions asked of True Confessions readers in Dayton, Ohio (chosen after the Census Bureau named it a typical wartime United States city).

By 1949, these old-style confession magazines faced a setback in the midst of a new comic book trend, over 100 love and romance titles from two dozen companies, with press runs averaging 500,000. Macfadden reported a loss in the second quarter of 1949, while Fawcett profited with its new romance comics, reaching a million readers with Sweethearts and 700,000 with Life Story.

During the 1950s, when True Confessions was priced at 15 cents, the editor was Florence J. Schetty. The contents of the March, 1959, issue, edited by Schetty and priced at 25 cents, provided insight into the magazine's approach during that period. It included "God Is My Guide" by Clint Walker, "Hairdos You Can Do Yourself" by Grace A. Hufner, " "When a Girl Goes to Prison" by Jules Archer, "I Couldn’t Forgive My Brother-in-Law" by Anonymous and "Let’s Enjoy Breakfast" by Erva Jean Vosburgh. Another editor in the field was Clark Dimond, who edited True Experience for Macfadden-Bartell during the 1960s.

== Reprints ==
Some articles for True Confessions were condensed for republication in Reader's Digest, and Fawcett launched its Gold Medal Books paperback line in 1949 with anthologies of material from True (The Best of True Magazine) and True Confessions (What Today's Woman Should Know About Marriage and Sex).

Macfadden-Bartell purchased the magazine in 1963. Macfadden spun off its romance and teen magazines as a separate company in 1992, which then merged with Sterling publication to form Sterling/Macfadden. Dorchester Media bought Sterling/Macfadden in 2004. In 2006, Dorchester teamed with Leisure Entertainment to launch a series of paperback anthologies titled True Confessions, True Romance and True Story. In 2012, Dorchester Media sold True Confessions and True Story magazines to True Renditions LLC.

== Sources ==
- "The Fawcett Formula" Time (March 19, 1945)
- Moriarty, Florence, editor. True Confessions: Sixty Years of Sin, Suffering & Sorrow (Fireside/Simon & Schuster, 1979)
