= George Henry Ross =

Canadian politician

The Honourable George Henry Ross KC
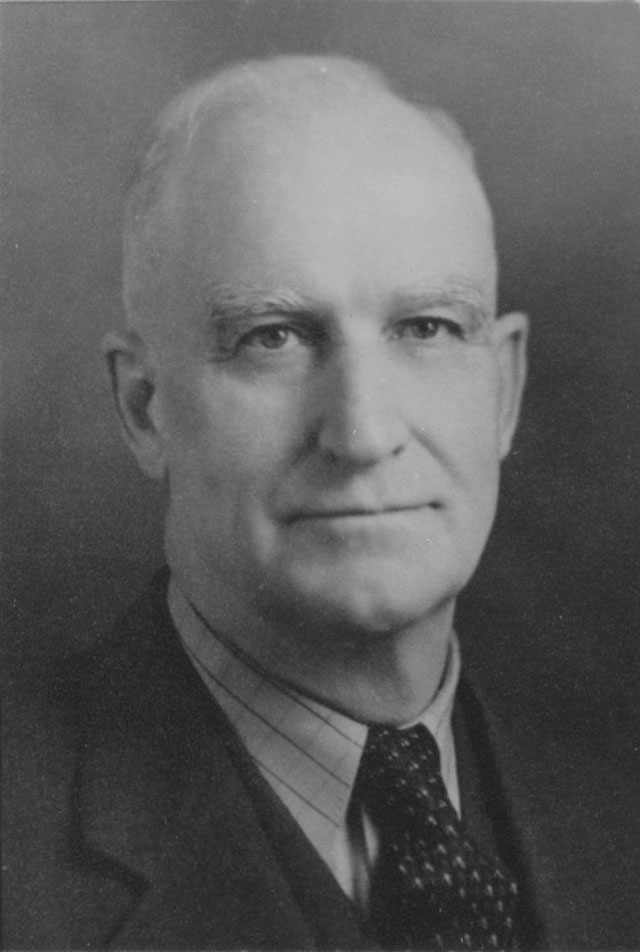

Canadian Senator from Alberta
- In office December 1, 1948 – September 26, 1956
- Appointed by: Louis St. Laurent

Member of Parliament for Calgary East
- In office March 26, 1940 – June 10, 1945
- Preceded by: John Landeryou
- Succeeded by: Douglas Harkness

Personal details
- Born: June 13, 1878 Bedeque, Prince Edward Island, Canada
- Died: September 26, 1956 (aged 77)
- Party: Liberal
- Children: 3
- Education: University of Michigan
- Profession: politician, barrister

George Henry Ross KC (June 13, 1878 – September 26, 1956) was a Canadian politician and barrister from Alberta. During his career, Ross served as a councillor on Calgary City Council, a Member of Parliament and senator.

== Early life ==
George Henry Ross was born June 13, 1878, at Bedeque, Prince Edward Island to Murdock and Margaret Ross. He earned a Bachelor of Laws from the University of Michigan. He married May McDougall on January 24, 1911; they had three children together. Appointed King's Counsel in 1913, Ross served as a bencher of the Law Society of Alberta from 1919 to 1930.

== Political career ==
Ross served for two one-year terms as a councillor on Calgary City Council in 1909 and again in 1912.

Ross attempted a career at provincial politics with a run in North Calgary in the 1913 Alberta general election as a candidate for the Alberta Liberal Party. He lost to Conservative candidate Samuel Bacon Hillocks.

Ross was elected to the House of Commons of Canada in the 1940 Canadian federal election, defeating incumbent Social Credit Member of Parliament John Landeryou. He and Manley Justin Edwards, elected in the same Liberal landslide victory, became the first two Liberal MPs from Calgary. He served one term as the Member of Parliament for Calgary East, then lost to Progressive Conservative Douglas Harkness in the 1945 Canadian federal election.

On December 1, 1948, he was appointed to sit in the Senate of Canada on the advice of Prime Minister Louis St. Laurent. He served in the Senate until his death on September 26, 1956.

Parliament of Canada
Preceded by John Landeryou	Member of Parliament Calgary East; 1940–1945	Succeeded by Douglas Harkness
Preceded by Daniel Edward Riley	Senator Alberta; 1948–1956	Succeeded by James Gladstone
