= 1929 Calgary municipal election =

Election in Alberta, Canada

- November 20, 1929
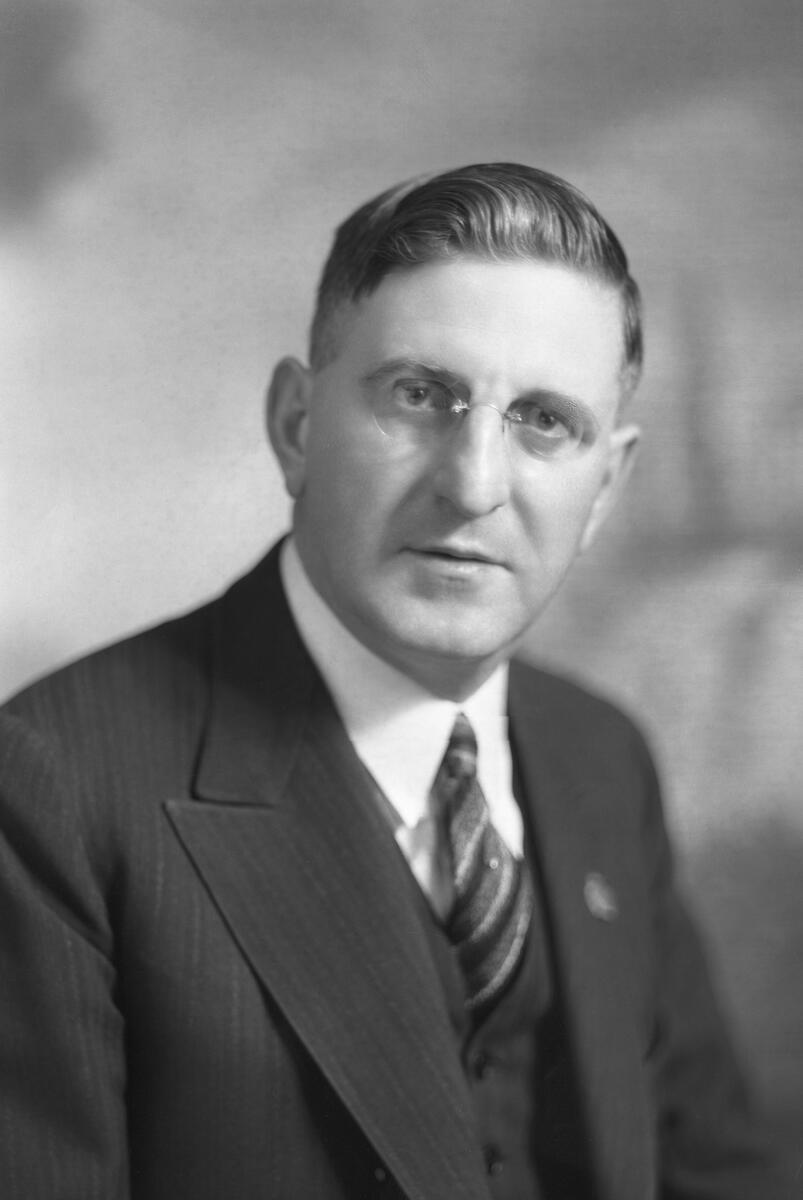
Candidate	Andrew Davison
Popular vote	Acclaimed
Mayor before election
Frederick Ernest Osborne
Elected mayor
Andrew Davison

The 1929 Calgary municipal election was held on November 20, 1929 to elect a Mayor and seven Aldermen to sit on Calgary City Council. Along with positions on Calgary City Council, four trustees for the Public School Board, three trustees for the Separate School Board, and seven questions put before the voters.

Calgary City Council governed under "Initiative, Referendum and Recall" which is composed of a Mayor, Commissioner and twelve Aldermen all elected to staggered two year terms. Commissioner Graves and five Aldermen: Peter Turner Bone, Eneas Edward McCormick, Harold Wigmore McGill, Edith Patterson, and Fred J. White elected in 1928 continued in their positions.

== Background ==
The election was held under the Single Transferable Voting/Proportional Representation (STV/PR) with the term for candidates being two years.

Andrew Davison resigned his seat as Alderman halfway through his two-year term to run as a candidate for Mayor. Davison was the only candidate and was acclaimed upon the close of nominations on November 12, 1929.

John Walker Russell who received the 7th most votes through the runoff process was elected to a single-year term to replace Andrew Davison.

== Results ==
=== Mayor ===
- Andrew Davison - Acclaimed

=== Council ===
Quota for election was 1,254.

Party	Candidate	Votes	%	Count	Elected
C.G.A.	Samuel Stanley Savage	1,672	%	1st	✓
C.G.A.	Pansy Louise Pue	1,487	%	1st	✓
Independent	Joseph Hope Ross	1,462	%	1st	✓
Independent	Robert Henry Parkyn	1,228	%	3rd	✓
Dominion Labor	John Walker Russell	1,060	%	7th	✓
C.G.A.	Robert Henry Weir	1,059	%	3rd	✓
C.G.A.	Jean Romeo Cyr-Miquelon	902	%	7th	✓
Dominion Labor	William Howell Arthur Thomas	521	%		
Independent	Hugh J. Duffield	160	%		
Dominion Labor	J. O'Sullivan	126	%		
Total valid votes		9,677			

=== Public School Board ===
Candidate	Votes	Percent	count
Amelia Turner	2,621		
W. Gordon Egbert	1,896		
A.B. Singleton	1,755		
F.E. Spooner	1,460		
E.S. Frost	874		
William Howard	661		

=== Separate school board ===
Candidate	Votes	Percent	count
George J. Connolly	195		
John Burns	194		
P.V. Burgard	152		
A.J. MacMillan	113		

== Plebiscites ==
=== Water main ===
Water main extension for $175,000. Approval requires two-thirds majority.

- For - 4,479
- Against - 1,423

=== Airport improvements ===
Airport improvements for $50,000. Approval requires two-thirds majority.

- For - 2,601
- Against - 3,225

=== River protection ===
River protection for $20,000. Approval requires two-thirds majority.

- For - 3,970
- Against - 1,955

=== Cemetery improvements ===
Cemetery improvements for $25,000. Approval requires two-thirds majority.

- For - 3,911
- Against - 2,025

=== Waterworks improvements ===
Waterworks improvements and construction of the Glenmore Reservoir for $3,770,000. Approval requires two-thirds majority.

- For - 4,279
- Against - 1,679

=== Business manager ===
Business manager. Approval requires majority.

- For - 4,937
- Against - 4,620

=== Fireman's hours ===
Fireman's hours. Approval requires majority.

- For - 4,793
- Against - 4,892

== See also ==
- List of Calgary municipal elections
