= Calgary Eye Opener =

Canadian satirical newspaper and humour magazine

- Type: Satirical newspaper
- Founder: Bob Edwards
- Publisher: Bob Edwards
- Editor: Bob Edwards
- Founded: June 6, 1902
- Ceased publication: c. 1939
- City: High River; Calgary; Port Arthur; Winnipeg; Minneapolis
- Country: Canada; United States
- Circulation: 35,000
- ISSN: 1497-973X

The Calgary Eye Opener, originally the Eye Opener, was a Canadian satirical newspaper founded and edited by journalist and politician Robert Chambers "Bob" Edwards. Established in High River, Alberta, in 1902, it was subsequently published from Calgary, Port Arthur, Ontario, and Winnipeg before Edwards returned it to Calgary in 1911. The newspaper became known for its combination of political commentary, humour, gossip and satire and for Edwards's attacks on politicians, businessmen, railway interests and other prominent figures.

Although nominally a weekly newspaper, the Eye Opener was published irregularly and was largely a vehicle for Edwards's writing and political views. At its height, it reportedly had a circulation of approximately 35,000.

Following Edwards's death in 1922, his widow continued the newspaper into 1923. The title was subsequently acquired by American publishers and continued in Minneapolis, where it was transformed into a risqué humour magazine. Despite the change in location and content, the American publication retained the Calgary Eye-Opener title and continued to be published by a company bearing Edwards's name.

== History ==
=== Canadian newspaper ===
Edwards founded the Eye Opener in High River in 1902. The earliest run catalogued by the New Brunswick Historical Newspapers Project dates from June 6, 1902. He moved the publication to Calgary in 1903, where it developed a following through his satirical treatment of local and provincial affairs.

Edwards moved the publication to Port Arthur, Ontario, in 1909 and subsequently to Winnipeg, where it was published from 1909 to 1911. He returned to Calgary in 1911, and the newspaper thereafter appeared as the Calgary Eye Opener. He returned to Calgary in 1911, and the newspaper thereafter appeared as the Calgary Eye Opener.

Edwards was the newspaper's sole editor and reporter and used it for social commentary and humour. Although billed as a weekly, it had neither its own printing facilities nor a regular staff and appeared according to Edwards's irregular schedule, which he described as "semi-occasionally". Although billed as a weekly, it had neither its own printing facilities nor a regular staff and appeared according to Edwards's own irregular schedule, which he described as "semi-occasionally".

By the time of Edwards's death, he had published as many as 500 issues.

=== Content and politics ===
The Eye Opener combined news and political commentary with jokes, gossip, cartoons and personal satire. Edwards frequently targeted politicians, businessmen, clergymen and members of Calgary's social establishment. His criticism could be highly personal, and he faced several libel actions because of his journalism.

Edwards was particularly critical of political corruption and powerful business interests. He attacked monopolies, fraudulent real-estate promoters and what he regarded as excessive civic boosterism. During Calgary's pre-First World War real-estate boom, the Eye Opener criticized speculative companies and promoters that Edwards believed were exploiting investors.

The newspaper also advocated a variety of social and political causes. Edwards supported women's suffrage, law reform, Canadian nationalism and assistance for the poor, and criticized the treatment of prostitutes. He also supported the campaign for prohibition in Alberta, although he later criticized its operation after observing the growth of the illegal liquor trade.

At its peak, the Eye Opener reportedly had a circulation of approximately 35,000. Edwards became one of the best-known journalists in western Canada. Edwards became one of the best-known journalists in western Canada.

In 1921 Edwards was elected as an independent member of the Legislative Assembly of Alberta. He continued publishing the newspaper while serving in the legislature.

=== After Edwards's death ===
Edwards published and edited the Calgary Eye Opener until July 29, 1922. He died in Calgary on November 14, 1922.

His widow, Katherine Edwards, continued the newspaper after his death. The Dictionary of Canadian Biography records that she continued it until at least August 18, 1923, which is also the final date in the Canadian newspaper run catalogued by the New Brunswick Historical Newspapers Project.

The title was subsequently sold to a firm in Minneapolis, where it continued publication as a humour magazine.

== American publication ==
By 1926 the Calgary Eye-Opener was being published in Minneapolis by the Bob Edwards Publishing Company. United States copyright records for that year identify the company as the copyright proprietor of the magazine. Contemporary issues were published as the Calgary Eye Opener Men's Digest and consisted largely of jokes, cartoons and risqué humour.

Three years after Edwards's death, publisher Harvey Fawcett acquired the publication. Fawcett, a brother of Captain Billy's Whiz Bang publishers Wilford and Roscoe Fawcett, transformed the Eye Opener into a bawdy joke magazine similar to Whiz Bang. Under Fawcett, its circulation was claimed to have reached 200,000.

The Minneapolis publication retained the Calgary Eye-Opener title and was issued by the Bob Edwards Publishing Company.

Although the magazine was headquartered in Minneapolis, Canadian editions continued to be produced. As late as 1932, issues intended for the Canadian market were printed in Winnipeg and Montreal. Harvey Fawcett died in 1928. The magazine was subsequently acquired by Henry Myers, who in 1932 sold it to Annette Fawcett, the former wife of Wilford Fawcett. Her acquisition placed the Eye Opener in direct competition with her former husband's Captain Billy's Whiz Bang, with both publications operating from Minneapolis.

In 1932, Time observed that there was little to distinguish the Eye Opener from Captain Billy's Whiz Bang apart from their titles.

Cartoonist Carl Barks, later known for his work on Donald Duck and for creating Scrooge McDuck, worked for the Minneapolis Calgary Eye-Opener during the 1920s and 1930s. He contributed cartoons and jokes and eventually became an editor of the magazine.

The American publication continued into the late 1930s. Surviving issues indicate that the Calgary Eye-Opener was still being published in 1939.

== Legacy and archives ==
The CBC Radio One morning programme Calgary Eyeopener takes its name from Edwards's newspaper.

The New Brunswick Historical Newspapers Project records issues of the original Eye Opener from 1902 to 1911 and the Calgary Eye Opener from 1911 through August 1923. The Calgary Public Library also holds issues of the Minneapolis publication beginning in 1927.

== See also ==
- Bob Edwards (satirist)
- Carl Barks
- History of Canadian newspapers
