= Samuel Bacon Hillocks =

Canadian politician (1869–1937)

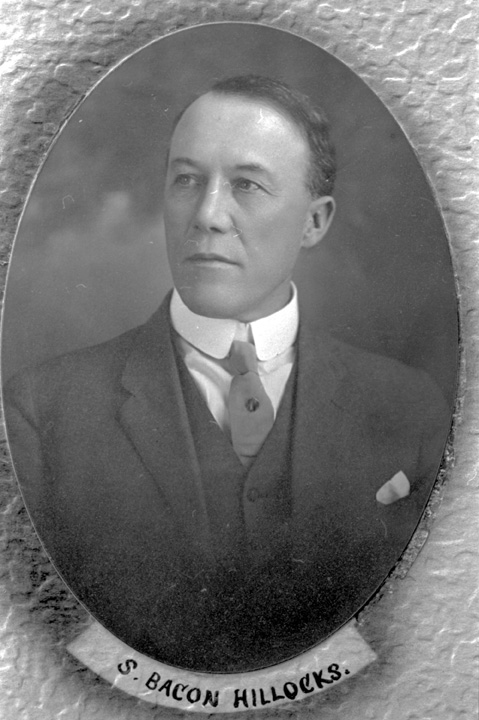

Samuel Bacon Hillocks (February 11, 1869 – 1937) was a politician, Presbyterian minister and inventor of the Grain Door. He lived in Calgary, Alberta, Canada as an adult but he was born in Bathurst, New Brunswick.

== Religion ==
Hillocks was one of the two ministers who presided over the Union Service in Calgary, Alberta, after the death of King Edward VII on May 20, 1910.

He resigned from his congregation on August 1, 1912.

== Political career ==
Hillocks ran for the Alberta Legislature as a Conservative candidate in the 1913 Alberta general election in the electoral district of North Calgary. He defeated Liberal candidate George Henry Ross and a Socialist Party candidate to win the seat.

Hillocks ran for re-election in the 1917 Alberta general election. This time he was defeated by Liberal candidate William McCartney Davidson.

Hillock ran again in the 1921 Alberta general election attempting to regain a seat in the legislature. He was badly defeated under the new block voting election system when he placed 18th out of 21 candidates and the Calgary district elected just five MLAs.

== Other accomplishments ==
Hillocks invented a type of Grain Door and was issued a patent by the Canadian Intellectual Property Office on May 24, 1938.

Legislative Assembly of Alberta
Preceded by New District	MLA North Calgary; 1913–1917	Succeeded by William McCartney Davidson
