= 1933 Calgary municipal election =

Election in Alberta, Canada

- November 22, 1933
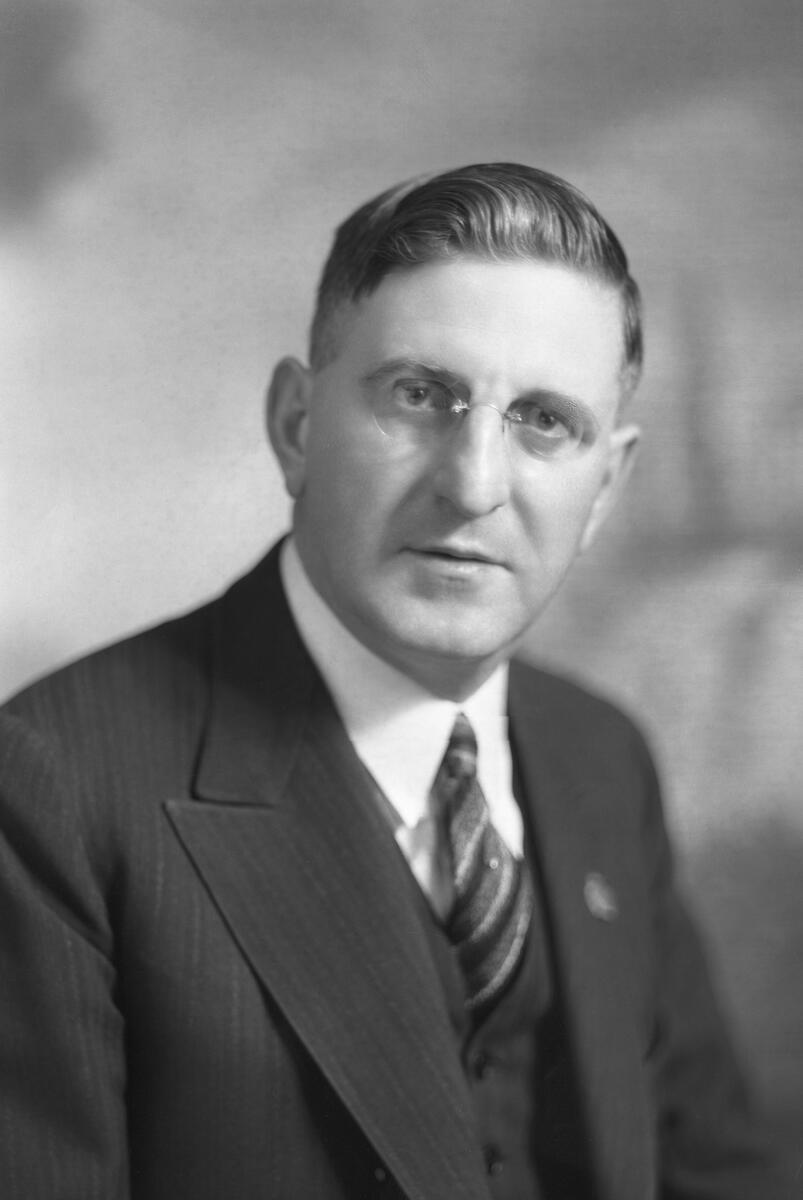
		S.S.S.
Candidate	Andrew Davison	Samuel Stanley Savage
Popular vote	20,366	3,315
Percentage	86%	14%
Mayor before election
Andrew Davison
Elected mayor
Andrew Davison

The 1933 Calgary municipal election was held on November 22, 1933 to elect a Mayor and six Aldermen to sit on Calgary City Council. Along with positions on Calgary City Council, a Commissioner, three trustees for the Public School Board, and two trustees for the Separate School Board.

Calgary City Council governed under "Initiative, Referendum and Recall" which is composed of a Mayor, Commissioner and twelve Aldermen all elected to staggered two year terms. Commissioner Thomas B. Riley and six Aldermen: Peter Turner Bone, William Ayer Lincoln, Robert Henry Parkyn, John Walker Russell, Fred J. White, and Harry Humble elected in 1932 continued in their positions.

== Background ==
The election was held under the Single Transferable Voting/Proportional Representation (STV/PR) with the term for candidates being two years. The total ballots cast in the election reached 23,681 which was the highest in Calgary history, over 5,000 more than the previous record in 1931.

== Results ==
Results from Calgary Daily Herald.

=== Mayor ===
Candidate	Votes	Percent
Andrew Davison	20,366	86%
Samuel Stanley Savage	3,315	14%

=== Council ===
Quota for election was 3,286.

Party	Candidate	Votes	%	Count	Elected
C.G.A.	Robert Henry Weir	3,369	%	1st	✓
C.G.A.	Alexander John MacMillan	3,367	%	1st	✓
Dominion Labor	William George Southern	3,029	%	3rd	✓
C.G.A.	Harold William Hounsfield Riley	2,058	%	8th	✓
Independent	Joseph Hope Ross	2,055	%	8th	✓
Independent	Joseph Brown Seymour	1,796	%	8th	✓
C.G.A.	Pansy Louise Pue	1,695	%		
Independent	Donald McPherson	1,278	%		
Dominion Labor	F.F. McNeill	1,230	%		
Dominion Labor	Thomas Sutcliffe	1,029	%		
Independent	Matthew Smith	916	%		
Total valid votes					

=== Public School Board ===
The quota was 3,053

Candidate	Votes	Percent	Round in which were elected
Amelia Turner	7,635		
F.E. Spooner	6,788		
E.J. Chambers	2,075		
P.L. Brooks	1,554		
Watson	1,545		
John O'Sullivan	920		
Lowe	378		

=== Separate school board ===
John Burns won by acclamation.

== Plebiscites ==
=== Elimination of Recall ===
For the elimination of recall provisions in the City Charter.

- For - 12,131
- Against - 8,758

=== Fire department hours ===
To provide fire fighters one day off in a seven-day week.

- For - 11,384
- Against - 11,227

== See also ==
- List of Calgary municipal elections
