= William McCartney Davidson =

Canadian politician (1872–1942)

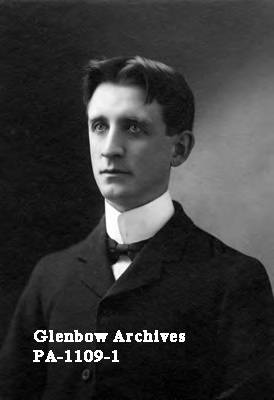
- Davidson pictured in 1905

Member of the Legislative Assembly of Alberta
- In office June 7, 1917 – July 17, 1921
- Constituency: North Calgary
- In office January 15, 1923 – October 17, 1925
- Constituency: Calgary

Personal details
- Born: 12 November 1872 Hillier, Prince Edward County, Ontario
- Died: 23 March 1942 (aged 69)
- Party: Alberta Liberal
- Occupation: Reporter, author, politician

William McCartney Davidson (November 12, 1872 – March 23, 1942) was a Canadian journalist, politician, and author.

== Early life ==
Born in Hillier, Prince Edward County, Ontario, the son of James C. Davidson, a farmer, and Sarah McCartney Davidson, Davidson was educated at the public school of his district, Picton High School, St. Catharines Collegiate Institute, and the University of Toronto where he received a Bachelor of Arts degree in 1893. He started working as a reporter for The Toronto World and soon joined the Toronto Star. He would report from the Ontario legislature for seven years.

== The Albertan ==
In 1902, Davidson founded The Albertan, a daily newspaper published in the Calgary region that would become the Calgary Sun, it was printed and published by his company The Albertan Pub. Co.

His newspaper was among the many institutions calling for reform of the first past the post system, which eventually resulted in the United Farmers government bringing in single transferable voting and Alternative Voting in 1924. By this time, he was not in favour of STV though.

== Political career ==
Davidson was elected to the Alberta Legislature in the 1917 Alberta general election as a Liberal. He defeated Conservative incumbent Samuel Bacon Hillocks by a comfortable margin to win to represent the North Calgary electoral district. He did not run for re-election.

Davidson ran for election again as an Independent in a Calgary electoral district provincial by-election on January 15, 1923, held after the death of MLA Robert Edwards. He defeated Liberal candidate Clinton J. Ford to win. He did not run for re-election.

He ran in the 1925 Canadian federal election in Calgary East. He was badly defeated, finishing a distant last behind Conservative Fred Davis, the winner, and Labor candidate William Irvine.

== Published works ==
After he retired from provincial politics Davidson spent 2 years from 1926 to 1928 researching Louis Riel. As a result, he wrote 2 biographical books on the man - Louis Riel, 1844-1885 : a biography and The life and times of Louis Riel. The second book was published as a condensed form of the first. Both books were published through his company The Albertan Pub. Co.

Legislative Assembly of Alberta
| Preceded by Samuel Bacon Hillocks | MLA North Calgary; 1917–1921 | Succeeded by District Abolished |
| Preceded by Robert Edwards | MLA Calgary; 1923–1926 | Succeeded by Alexander McGillivray; John Irwin; George Webster; Robert Parkyn |
