= North Calgary =

Defunct provincial electoral district in Alberta, Canada

Coordinates: 51.099°N 114.073°W

Alberta electoral district

Defunct provincial electoral district
- Legislature: Legislative Assembly of Alberta
- District created: 1913
- District abolished: 1921
- First contested: 1913
- Last contested: 1917

North Calgary was a provincial electoral district in Calgary, Alberta, Canada, mandated to return a single member to the Legislative Assembly of Alberta using the first past the post method of voting from 1913 to 1921.

== History ==
=== Boundary history ===
North Calgary 1913 boundaries
Bordering districts
North	East	West	South
Cochrane	Gleichen	Centre Calgary, Cochrane	Okotoks
Legal description from the Statutes of Alberta 1913, An Act to Amend the Act respecting the Legislative Assembly of Alberta.
riding map goes here		map in relation to other districts in Calgary goes here	
North Calgary.—All that portion of the City of Calgary as follows: Commencing at the north-east corner of the city limits of the City of Calgary; thence west along the north boundary of the said city limits of the City of Calgary to the north-west corner thereof; thence south along the west boundary of the city limits of the City of Calgary to the point of its intersection with the centre line of the Bow River; thence generally east and south along the said centre line of the Bow River to the point of its intersection with the north boundary of the 23rd townships, being the south boundary of the city limits of the City of Calgary; thence east along the said south boundary of city limits of the City of Calgary to the south-east corner thereof; thence north along the eastern boundary of the city limits of the City of Calgary to the point of commencement, and, Commencing at the north-east corner of township 26, range 29, west of the 4th meridian; thence west along the north boundary of the 26th townships to the meridian line between ranges 2 and 3 west of the 5th meridian; thence south along the said meridian line between ranges 2 and 3, west of the 5th meridian to the point of its intersection with the Bow River; thence generally south-east along the said Bow River to the western boundary of the City limits of the City of Calgary; thence north, east and south following the said city limits of the City of Calgary to the point of its intersection with the north boundary of the 23rd townships; thence east along the said north boundary of the 23rd townships to the meridian line between ranges 28 and 29, west of the 4th meridian; thence north along the said meridian line between ranges 28 and 29, west of the 4th meridian to the point of commencement.
Note: Boundaries came into force in 1913 and lasted until the district was abolished.

Members of the Legislative Assembly for North Calgary
Assembly	Years	Member	Party
See Calgary electoral district from 1905-1913
3rd	1913–1917	Samuel Hillocks	Conservative
4th	1917–1920	William Davidson	Independent
4th	1920–1921	Vacant	
See Calgary electoral district from 1921-1959

=== Electoral history ===
The electoral district was created in 1913 as part of a contentious boundary redistribution that saw the Calgary provincial electoral district broken up into three single member constituencies, the other two being South Calgary and Centre Calgary. Conservative candidates won all three districts that year on a wave of anti Liberal support in the city as electors were unhappy with Premier Arthur Sifton.

Calgary North would swing to the Liberal column in the 1917 general election as incumbent Samuel Hillocks was defeated by star candidate journalist William Davidson. The electoral district would be abolished in 1921 as Calgary was reconstituted into a five-member district.

== Election results ==
=== 1913 ===
1913 Alberta general election
Party	Candidate	Votes	%	±%
Conservative	Samuel Bacon Hillocks	1,482	57.89%	–
Liberal	George Henry Ross	822	32.11%	–
Socialist	Harry Roderick Burge	256	10.00%	–
Total		2,560	–	–
Rejected, spoiled and declined		N/A	–	–
Eligible electors / turnout		4,258	60.12%	–
Conservative pickup new district.				
Source(s) Source: "Calgary-North Official Results 1913 Alberta general election". Alberta Heritage Community Foundation.

=== 1917 ===
1917 Alberta general election
Party	Candidate	Votes	%	±%
Liberal	William McCartney Davidson	2,701	54.72%	22.61%
Conservative	Samuel Bacon Hillocks	2,235	45.28%	-12.61%
Total		4,936	–	–
Rejected, spoiled and declined		N/A	–	–
Eligible electors / turnout		7,712	64.00%	3.88%
Liberal gain from Conservative		Swing		-8.17%
Source(s) Source: "Calgary-North Official Results 1917 Alberta general election". Alberta Heritage Community Foundation.

== See also ==
- List of Alberta provincial electoral districts
- Canadian provincial electoral districts
