= Alex Ross (politician) =

Canadian politician

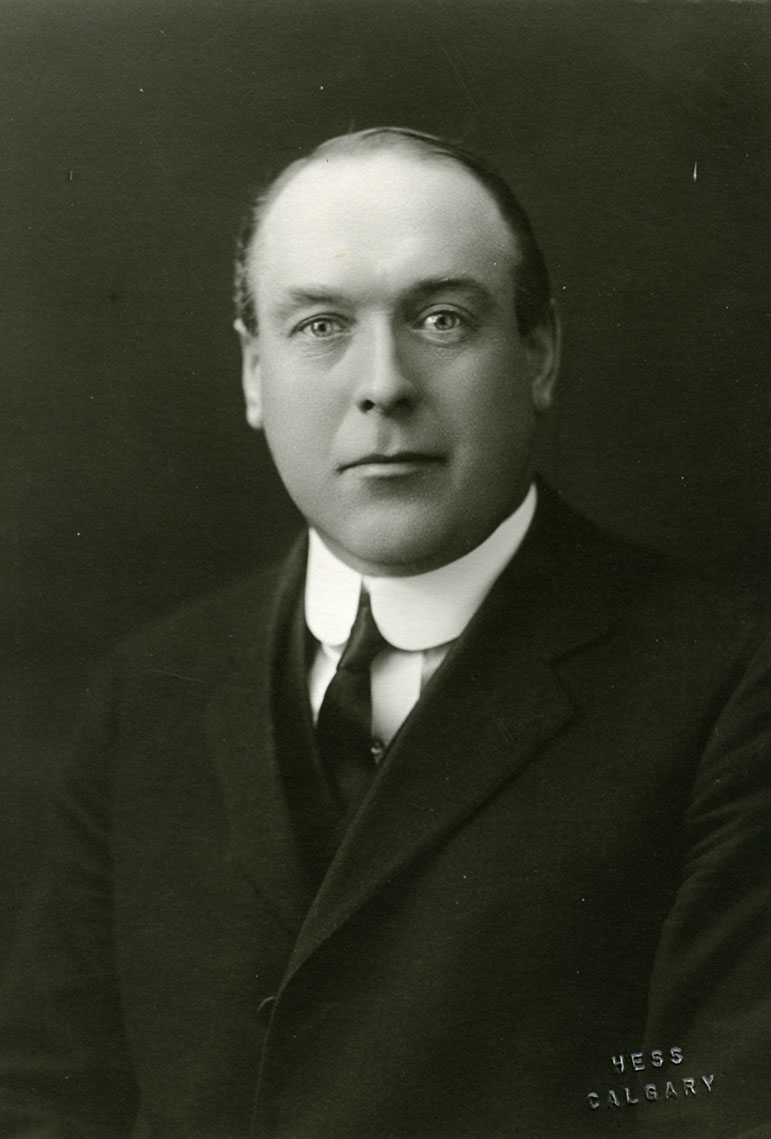
- Ross pictured c. 1921–26

Member of the Legislative Assembly of Alberta
- In office 1917–1921
- Preceded by: Thomas Tweedie
- Constituency: Centre Calgary
- In office 1921–1926
- Preceded by: William Cushing; Thomas Tweedie
- Succeeded by: Alexander McGillivray; John Irwin; George Webster; Robert Parkyn
- Constituency: Calgary

Personal details
- Born: 15 January 1880 Premnoy, Scotland
- Died: 17 July 1953 (aged 73) Victoria, British Columbia, Canada
- Party: Dominion Labour
- Occupation: stonemason

Alexander Ross (15 January 1880 – 17 July 1953) was a stonemason, trade unionist and politician in Alberta, Canada. He served as an Labour Party MLA in the Alberta Legislature from 1917 to 1926, as a cabinet minister in the United Farmers of Alberta government from 1921 to 1926 and as chairman of the Workmen's Compensation Board to 1935.

== Early life ==
He was born in Premnoy, Scotland.

== His political career ==
Ross was elected in the 1917 Alberta election defeating Conservative Thomas Tweedie. He was elected as the first and only member of the Labor Representation League to sit in the assembly. The Labor Representation League later merged with the Dominion Labor Party (Alberta).

In the 1921 Alberta election after Calgary Centre was abolished he ran in the reconstituted Calgary riding and won the top spot in a 5-member block vote. In that election the United Farmers of Alberta defeated the Liberals in the rural part of the province, and formed the government. The United Farmers did not run any candidates in Calgary and Ross was asked to serve as Minister of Public Works despite being a member of the opposition. During his time as Minister, he revised the Workmen's Compensation Act, introduced the Minimum Wage Act and the Superannuation Act. The Old Age Pensions Act, adopted after his retirement in 1926, was largely his work.

Ross was acclaimed in a ministerial by-election on December 9, 1921.

In 1922 Ross helped found the Canadian Labor Party and served on its executive with other prominent labor politicians of the era, such as Elmer Ernest Roper and Alf Farmilo.

Ross served as a cabinet minister and as MLA up to the 1926 Alberta general election. He was nominated by the Canadian Labor Party to run in Calgary. However the Calgary Herald reported that he did not appear to be enthusiastic to run, but accepted his nomination anyway.

He was not re-elected. Calgary elected its MLAs in a single multi-member district through Single transferable vote in 1926. It elected five MLAs. Ross placed sixth in the First Count ahead of five others including fellow Labour candidate Fred White. White gradually accumulated more votes than Ross through vote transfers as others were eliminated under STV rules. Ross was eliminated in the 8th Count, while White went on to be elected.

== Post-political retirement ==
Shortly after his 1926 defeat, he was named chairman of the Workmen's Compensation Board , a post he held to 1935. During this time he also oversaw the province's old age pension. After the election of Aberhart's Social Credit government in 1935, Aberhart asked him to resign.

He died July 17, 1953.
