= John McNeill (Alberta politician) =

John McNeill was a municipal politician from Calgary, Alberta, Canada. He served as an Alderman on Calgary City Council from January 6, 1916 to January 2, 1918.

== Political career ==
McNeill was elected to Calgary city council for the first time in the 1916 Calgary municipal election. He was re-elected again in 1917.

While still an Alderman, McNeill ran in the South Calgary provincial electoral district, as a Liberal-Conservative candidate. McNeill was neither endorsed by the Liberals or Conservatives but did not want to run under an Independent banner. He felt that his chances of winning a seat in the provincial legislature were good. McNeill ran on a platform of fiscal conservatism.

He finished third place in the three-way race behind Labor activist William Irvine and incumbent Conservative MLA Thomas Blow. He took 19% of the popular vote in that election.

McNeill did not return to City council in the 1918 Calgary municipal election.
