= Balaclava, Grey County, Ontario =

Balaclava
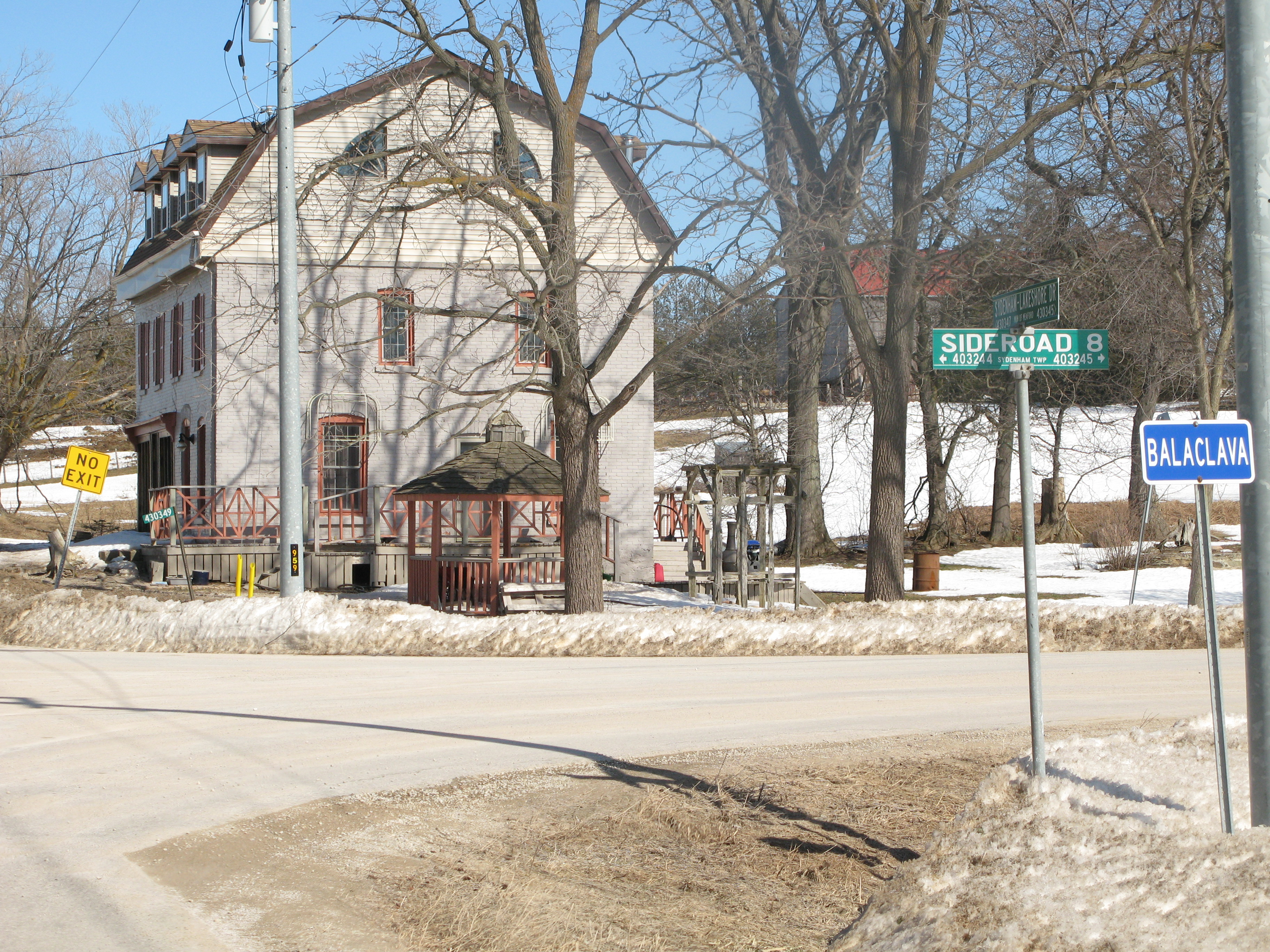
- Balaclava Corner (March, 2007)
- Etymology: named for the Battle of Balaclava
- Location of Balaclava in Ontario.
- Coordinates: 44°40′59″N 80°46′44″W
- Country: Canada
- Province: Ontario
- County: Grey
- Elevation: 227 m (745 ft)
- Time zone: UTC-5 (Eastern Time Zone)
  - Summer (DST): UTC-4 (Eastern Time Zone)
- Forward Sortation Area: N4L
- Area codes: 519, 226

Balaclava is a community in the municipality of Meaford in Grey County, Ontario, Canada. It is about 17 kilometres (11 mi) northwest of the centre of Meaford and 18 kilometres (11 mi) northeast of the city of Owen Sound, about 2.5 kilometres (1.6 mi) inland of Owen Sound on Georgian Bay, Lake Huron.

Settled in the early 1850s by Scottish immigrants, Balaclava grew around a mill established by George Scott. The majority of settlers came as a result of the Highland Clearances and/or the Potato Famine (1846-1857). Balaclava was originally located at Lot 3, Concession B, and Lot 4, Concession C of Sydenham Township in Grey County (see External Links). Gradually the village moved a mile and a quarter south to its present location at the junction of County Grey Road 20 and Side Road 8. Its name is likely derived from the Crimean War (1853-1856) and the Battle of Balaclava, which occurred on October 25, 1854, and in which many Scottish soldiers died.

== Early businesses and services ==
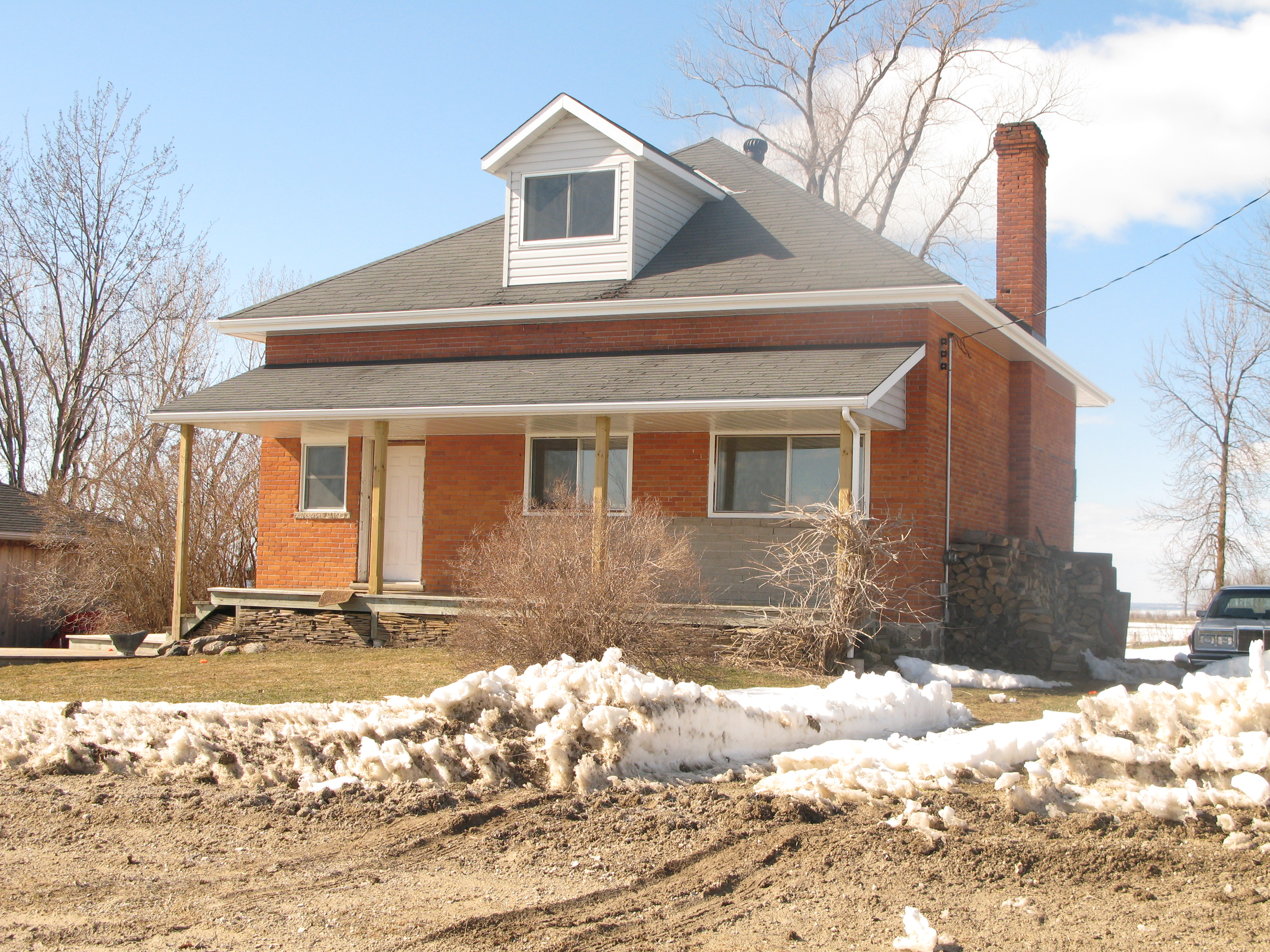
Balaclava School (March, 2007)

A school was built in 1862. This building burned shortly thereafter, and classes were held in the Orange Lodge until a new log school was built on the site of the modern school building. Attendance in 1862 averaged 25 students. However, in the early days, many older students attended only in the winter as they were needed at home on the farm. The Balaclava school closed in June 1965. Students were transported to nearby Leith for the next two years until 1967, when Sydenham Central School was opened in Owen Sound.

A post office opened on February 1, 1890; W.H. Hunt as the postmaster. The post office remained open until November 30, 1961.

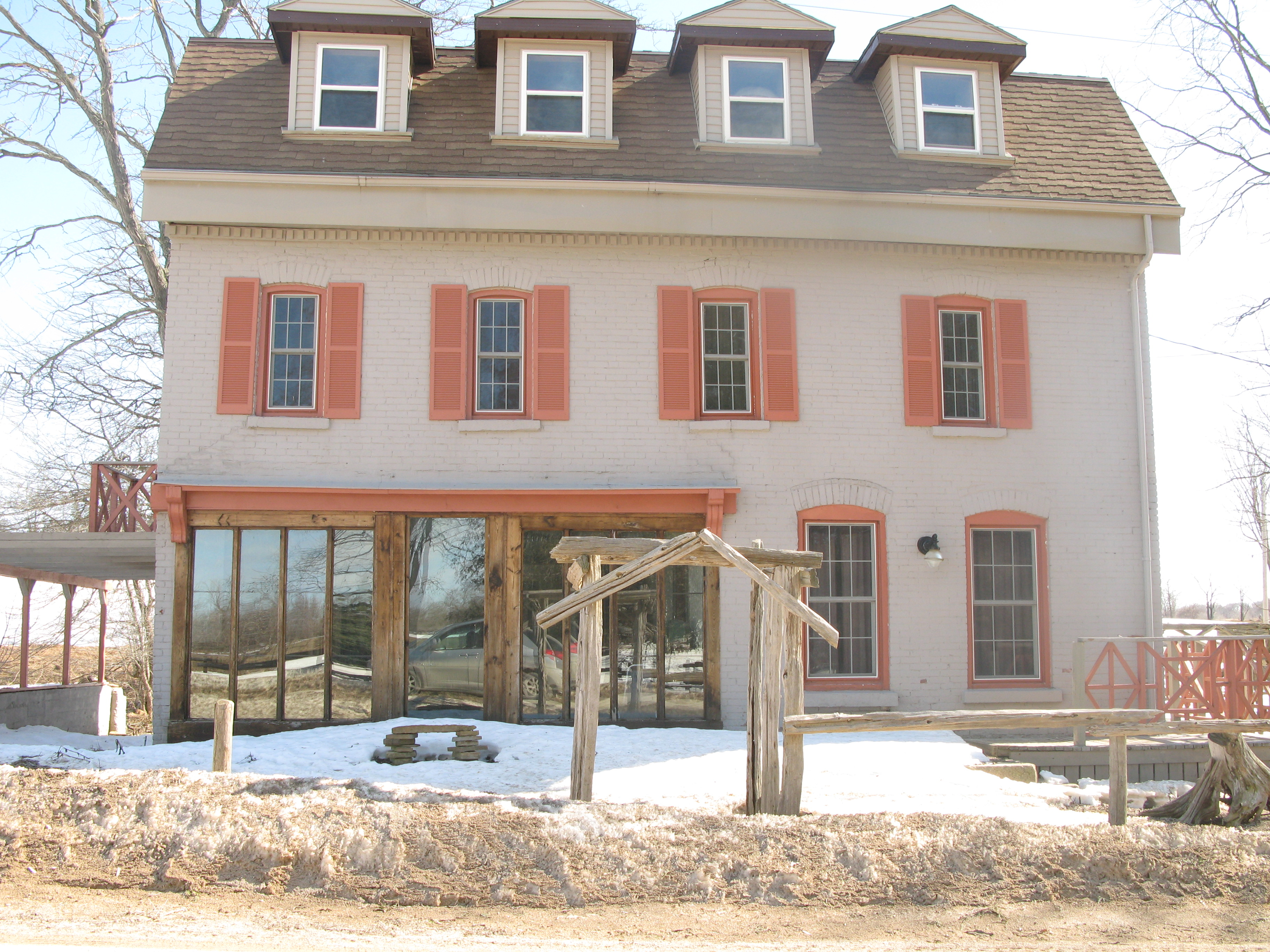
Balaclava Store (March, 2007)

The first general store was opened in the 1860s and owned by John Kergan. The general store often incorporated postal services. Numerous proprietors ran the store in Balaclava's original location, including Larry Hunt, David Dodge, and George Howitt. As the village moved southward in the early 1900s, a new store was opened by John Watson in his frame home. The large brick building which would become the general store until the early 1960s was built in 1919. Mr. Herb Dickson ran the store until 1961. The store remained closed until 1965, when Bruce Keill opened it for summer business until 1967.

There was never a church located in Balaclava. Nearby churches included Johnstone United, built in 1855, and Silcote United, built 1877. The last of these to remain open was Johnstone, which closed in the early 1970s. The congregations moved to Annan United, located in Annan, Ontario, six miles (10 km) south-west of Balaclava, and Woodford United, located some 10 miles (20 km) south-east.

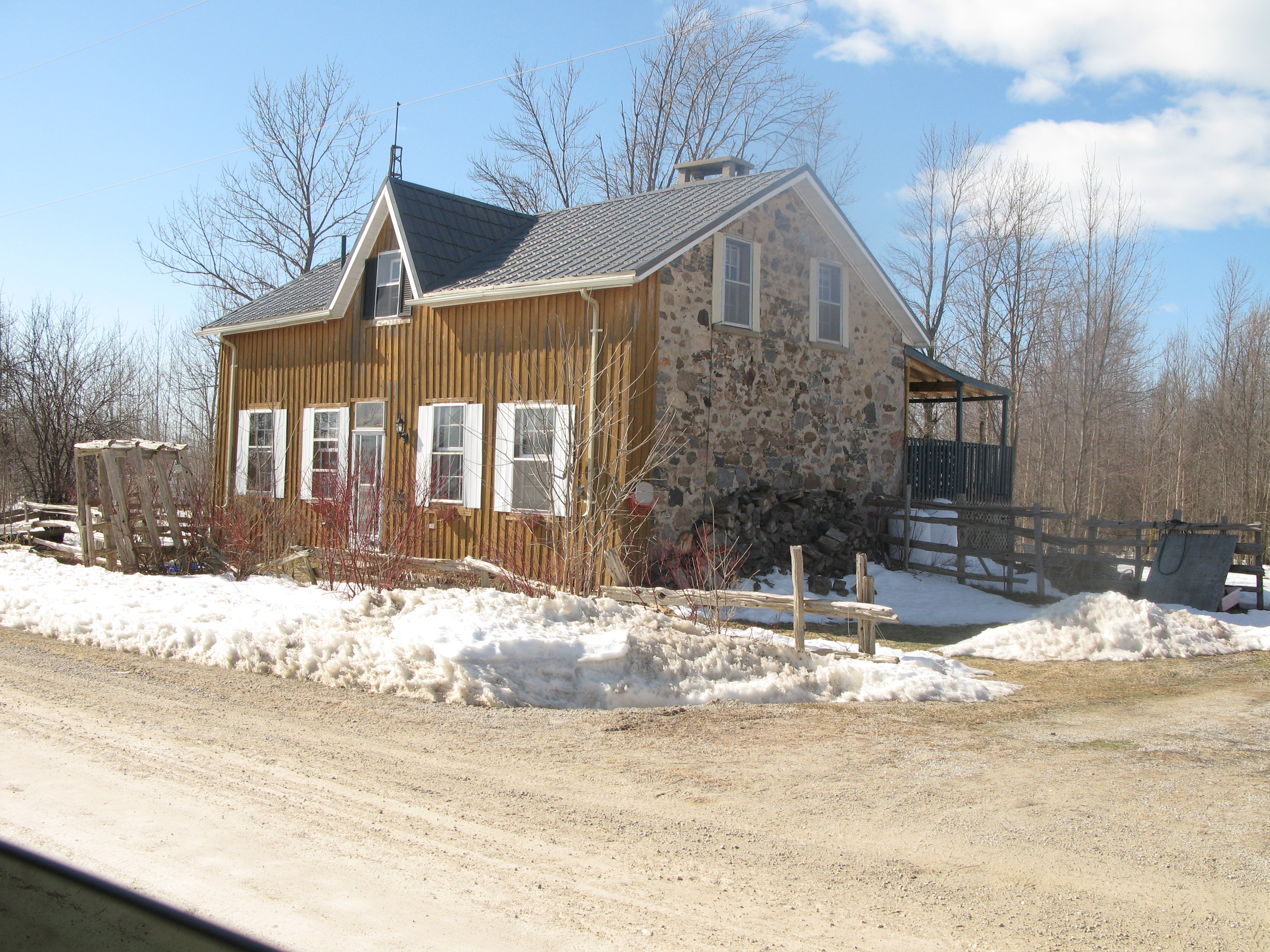
Balaclava's Original Post Office

At least one blacksmith shop operated at Balaclava's original location. When the village moved, a new one was built on lot 8 of concession C. John Lourie took over the shop in the 1920s and continued to operate it into the 1970s.

A telephone company was formed in 1912 to connect to the Bell Telephone Company (Bell Canada) at Owen Sound. The 34 original subscribers each paid $35 to join, and "bees" were held throughout that summer to erect the poles. There were three circuits: 695, 696, and 697. The line operated until 1960, when it was bought out by Bell. The switch board system was then replaced and updated to the dial system.

At one time Balaclava boasted two blacksmith shops, a woodworking shop, a post office, three stores, and a hotel.

== Decline ==
The economy of Balaclava was dealt a serious blow in 1942, when the government of Canada purchased 17,500 acres (68 km^{2}) to create what has become known as the Meaford Tank Range (LFCATC Meaford). This displaced dozens of local farm families. The land was deemed ideal for military training since it incorporated limestone cliffs, rolling open ground, and dense bush. The area was also interspersed with a year-round swamp, a lake, and 22 kilometres of shoreline to the east and north.

== Sports ==
Throughout its history, Balaclava has had a strong sporting tradition. Local young men would work all day, and participate in cricket, football (soccer), softball, and hockey in the evenings. Or matches would often be the central entertainment at garden parties.

Cricket teams were organized as early as the late 1850s, with the first township match occurring in 1864, in Balaclava. George Sr. and John Scott were strong players with this team.

During the 1920s and 1930s, football (soccer) was the sport of choice. Members of Balaclava's 20s team included Walter Scott, Duncan Moulton, Luther Clar, Norm Waterton, Ben Johnstone, Robert Lourie, George Fraser, Will Moulton, Robert Watson, Albert Laycock, and Mike Robertson. In the late 1930s, Balaclava joined the Sydenham Soccer league, composed of teams from Annan, Bognor, and Strathaven. Balaclava won the championship in 1938. They went on to play Owen Sound, who had won the championship in their league. Although Owen Sound was strongly favoured to win, Balaclava managed to defeat them by the score of 1–0.

By the 1940s, hockey had become the predominant sport. In the 1946/47 season, Balaclava entered a team in the Rural Hockey League, which included teams from Woodford, Chatsworth, Kilsyth, Tara, and Allenford. Balaclava won the league, and at the celebratory banquet Syl Apps and Gus Bodnar were guest speakers. Members of this championship team included Lloyd Spence, Harold Scott, Jim Lemon, Norm Bell, Ken Spence, and Tom Johnson, G. Abbot (coach), W. Spence, Gordon Scott, Carl Spence, Elgin Vanwyck, Earl Spence, Russ Farquharson, and Ernest Vanwyck (manager).

Cricket teams were organized as early as the late 1850s with the first township match occurring in 1864, in Balaclava. George Sr. and John Scott were strong players with this team.

1989 Balaclava Burners

Between 1950 and 1970, little sport was played in Balaclava. The youth of the area would often meet at the home of Harold and Doreen Scott for pick-up baseball games or at Jim and Lorraine Lemon's for impromptu soccer or hockey matches. This was a period when school expansion and amalgamation occurred.

In the mid-1970s, three local young men - Lane Lemon, Paul J Scott, and Lloyd Mitchell - formed the Balaclava Burners. This team drew others from the communities of Leith, Annan, and even Owen Sound. Since the nearest year-round ice surface was in Owen Sound, practices and games were often held there, although the team also played in Keady, Chatsworth, Kilsyth, and Wiarton. Members of the team in 1987 included (from bottom left) Gary Tottenham, Joe O'Reilly, Ken Morrison, Pat Moore, and Steve Hiscox; and (from top left) Jeff Morrison (Equipment Manager), Paul J Scott, Lane Lemon, Craig Stephens, Scott Davis, Ted Van Balkom, Paul Smith, Tim Hughes, Bev Davidson, Jim Edmonstone, and Jeff Harron (managing due to suspension).

== Culture ==
=== Great Lakes Jam ===
In late August 2004, executive producer Wolfgang Siebert staged a three-day rock festival on top of Coffin Hill, 3 kilometres (2 mi) west of Balaclava and with a panoramic view of Georgian Bay. The 168 hectares (415 acres) of rolling hills of the main site had camping, washroom, and shower facilities.

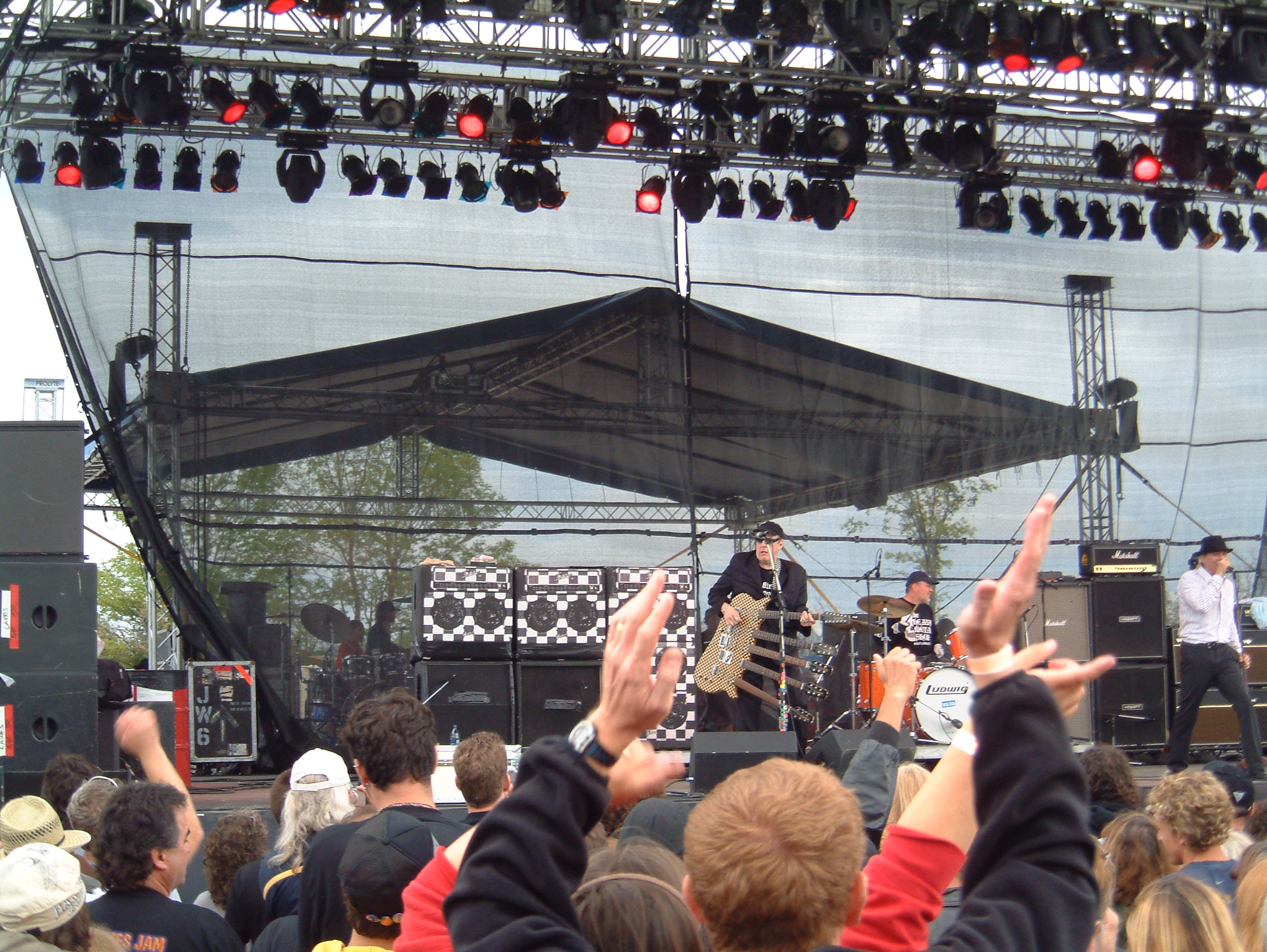
Cheap Trick at Great Lakes Jam

Beginning on August 27, the festival featured Alice Cooper, Joe Walsh, The B-52's, Johnny Winter, Creedence Clearwater Revisited, Blue Öyster Cult, Steppenwolf, Kim Mitchell, Rick Derringer, and Cheap Trick, among others.

Part of the proceeds of the event were to go to the Grey County Cattlemen's Association as well as St. John Ambulance, which was building a new training centre and office called the Ed Tottenham House in Owen Sound.

Siebert's plan was to stage further concerts at the site each summer. However, a local community group blocked his plans, because of improper clearances and concerns about traffic flows, and future concerts have been stopped until these concerns are addressed.

== Housing development ==
Two housing developments are in progress near Balaclava. Queen's Bush is located a 2.4 kilometres (1.5 mi) to the north, north-east. The Birches is part of Eagle Ridge Developments and is located 4 kilometres (2.5 mi) to the north, north-west.
