= South Calgary (provincial electoral district) =

Defunct provincial electoral district in Alberta, Canada

Coordinates: 51.01°N 114.07°W

Alberta electoral district

Defunct provincial electoral district
- Legislature: Legislative Assembly of Alberta
- District created: 1913
- District abolished: 1921
- First contested: 1913
- Last contested: 1917

South Calgary was a provincial electoral district in Calgary, Alberta, Canada, mandated to return a single member to the Legislative Assembly of Alberta using the first past the post method of voting from 1913 to 1921.

== History ==
=== Boundary history ===
South Calgary 1913 boundaries
Bordering districts
North	East	West	South
Cochrane	Centre Calgary	Cochrane	Okotoks
Legal description from the Statutes of Alberta 1913, An Act to Amend the Act respecting the Legislative Assembly of Alberta.
riding map goes here		map in relation to other districts in Calgary goes here	
South Calgary.—All that portion of the City of Calgary as follows: Commencing at the point of the intersection of the western boundary of the city limits of the City of Calgary, and the centre line of the main line of the Canadian Pacific Railway; thence generally east and south along said centre line of the main line of the Canadian Pacific Railway to the point of its intersection with the centre line of the Bow River in the south-east quarter of section 1, township 24, range 1, west of the 5th meridian; thence south-west along the said centre line of the Bow River to the point of its intersection with the south boundary of the city limits of the City of Calgary; thence west along the said south boundary of the city limits of the City of Calgary to the south-west corner thereof; thence north along the west boundary of the city limits of the City of Calgary to the point of commencement, and, Commencing at the north-east corner of township 23, range 29, west of the 4th meridian; thence west along the north boundary of the 23rd townships to the point of its intersection with the west boundary of the said west boundary of the city limits of the City of Calgary to the point of its intersection with the Bow River; thence generally north-west along the centre line of the said Bow River to its intersection with the meridian line between ranges 2 and 3, west of the 5th meridian; thence south along the said meridian line between ranges 2 and 3, west of the 5th meridian, to the north boundary of the 24th townships to the meridian line between ranges 3 and 4, west of the 5th meridian; thence south along said meridian line between ranges 3 and 4, west of the 5th meridian to the north boundary of the 23td townships; thence east along the said north boundary of the 23rd townships to the meridian line between ranges 1 and 2, west of the 5th meridian; thence south along said meridian line between ranges 1 and 2 west of the 5th meridian, to the point of its intersection with the north boundary of section 30, township 23, range 1, west of the 5th meridian to the point of its intersection with the Bow River; thence generally south along said Bow River to the north boundary of the 22md townships; thence east along said north boundary of the 22nd townships to the meridian line between ranges 28 and 29 west of the 4th meridian; thence north along said meridian line between ranges 28 and 29, west of the 4th meridian to the point of commencement.
Note: Boundaries came into force in 1913 and lasted until the district was abolished.

Members of the Legislative Assembly for South Calgary
Assembly	Years	Member	Party
See Calgary electoral district from 1905-1913
3rd	1913-1917	Thomas Blow	Conservative
4th	1917-1921	Thomas Blow	Conservative
See Calgary electoral district from 1921-1959

=== Electoral history ===
The South Calgary electoral district was created in 1913 when the Calgary provincial electoral district was carved into three ridings. The first election in 1913 featured a two candidate fight between Dr. Thomas Blow Conservative candidate and well known Calgary area lawyer Clifford Jones.

Blow won the district with 71% of the popular vote, riding the peak of a wave that saw all the Calgary districts return Conservatives that year.

The second and final election in the district in 1917 saw Blow re-elected. Blow defeated Labor Representation leader William Irvine and sitting City of Calgary Alderman John McNeill to hold his district. The South Calgary district was abolished in 1921 as Calgary was reconstituted into a five-member district.

== Election results ==
=== 1913 ===
1913 Alberta general election
Party	Candidate	Votes	%	±%
Conservative	Thomas H. Blow	3,654	71.97%	–
Liberal	Clifford T. Jones	1,423	28.03%	–
Total		5,077	–	–
Rejected, spoiled and declined		N/A	–	–
Eligible electors / turnout		7,958	63.80%	–
Conservative pickup new district.				
Source(s) Source: "Calgary-South Official Results 1913 Alberta general election". Alberta Heritage Community Foundation.

=== 1917 ===
1917 Alberta general election
Party	Candidate	Votes	%	±%
Conservative	Thomas H. Blow	3,273	48.01%	-23.96%
Labor Representation	William Irwin	2,248	32.98%	–
Liberal–Conservative	John McNeill	1,296	19.01%	–
Total		6,817	–	–
Rejected, spoiled and declined		N/A	–	–
Eligible electors / turnout		14,401	47.34%	-16.46%
Conservative hold		Swing		-14.45%
Source(s) Source: "Calgary-South Official Results 1917 Alberta general election". Alberta Heritage Community Foundation.

== See also ==
- List of Alberta provincial electoral districts
- Canadian provincial electoral districts
