= Thomas Blow =

Canadian politician (1862–1932)

Thomas Henry Blow
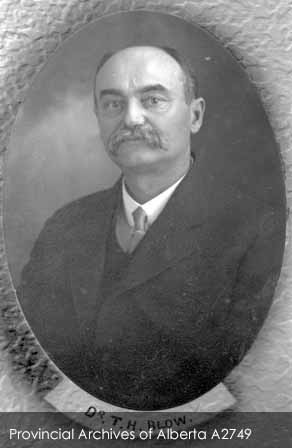
- Thomas Blow 1913 campaign photo

Member of the Legislative Assembly of Alberta
- In office April 17, 1913 – July 17, 1921
- Constituency: South Calgary

Personal details
- Born: January 22, 1862 North Mountain, Canada West
- Died: December 27, 1932 (aged 70) Vancouver, British Columbia
- Party: Conservative
- Spouse: Ida J.
- Children: 4
- Education: McGill University (M.D.)
- Occupation: doctor

Thomas Henry Blow (January 22, 1862 – December 27, 1932) was a Canadian provincial level politician and physician from Alberta.

== Early life ==
Thomas Henry Blow was born January 22, 1862, in North Mountain, Canada West (currently within North Dundas, Ontario) to Robert H. Blow and Sarah Henderson. Blow attended Kemptville High School, and went on to McGill University where he completed his Doctor of Medicine in 1885. He worked in Denver and Ottawa, until moving to Calgary in 1903.

== Political life ==
Blow first ran for the Alberta Legislature as part of a 2-man Conservative slate in the Calgary provincial electoral district in the 1909 Alberta general election. He finished 4th out of 5th place in the block vote. The winners was the other Conservative candidate in the slate Richard Bennett and Liberal incumbent William Henry Cushing.

The province's electoral districts would see significant redistribution in the 1913 Alberta general election and Calgary would be divided up into 3 constituencies. Blow ran as the Conservative candidate in the new South Calgary riding. He won the new district in a landslide over Liberal candidate Clifford Jones. Blow served in the official opposition.

Blow stood for re-election in the 1917 Alberta general election this time defeating Labor candidate and future federal Member of Parliament William Irvine and alderman John McNeill to earn a second term in office.

Calgary would grow to 5 seats in the 1921 Alberta general election and be changed back to a block vote, Blow would run for re-election amongst 20 other candidates. He would finish 12th out of 21 and go down to defeat. He died in Vancouver, British Columbia in 1932.

Legislative Assembly of Alberta
Preceded by New District	MLA South Calgary; 1913–1921	Succeeded by District abolished
