= Sydenham, Grey County, Ontario =

Coordinates: 44.567°N 80.800°W

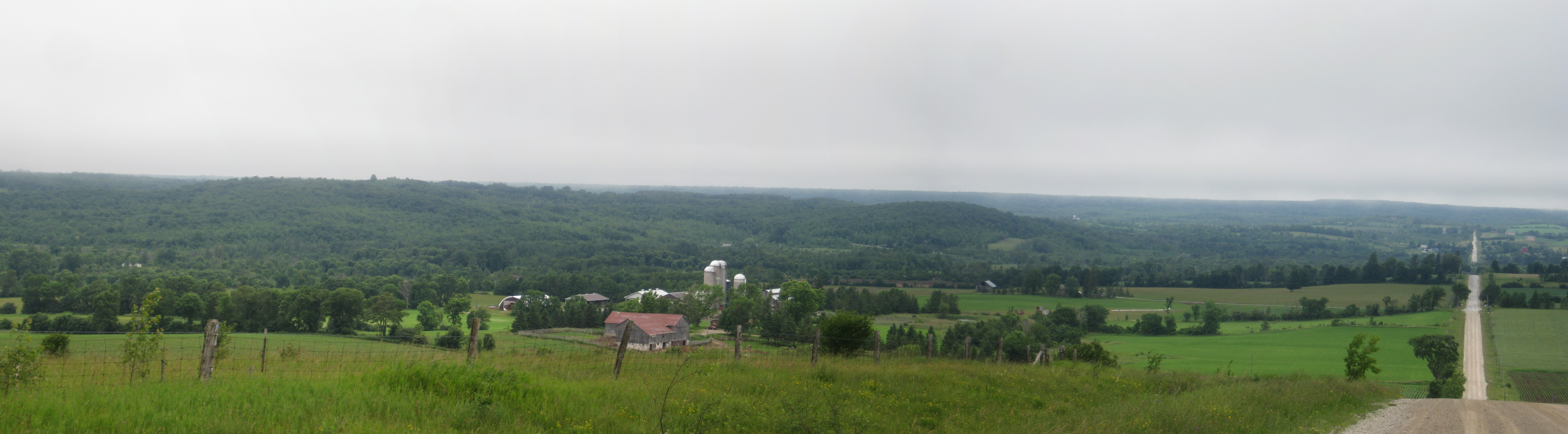
South Sydenham, Ontario

Location of Sydenham in Ontario

Sydenham was a township community in Grey County, Ontario, Canada, named in part for Lord Sydenham, governor of Canada from 1839 to 1841. The area is bounded on the north side by Owen Sound, a large inlet of Georgian Bay.

Sydenham Township was surveyed in 1842, with concessions running north to south, and at that time the land consisted mainly of hardwood forest. Immigrants from Scotland and Ireland began to settle this area at about this time. The first mill was built in 1846, and the first school section was organized in 1851.

The first post office, at Woodford, was established in 1852. In 1853 the residents organized an Agricultural Society. By 1861 there were over 3,000 people living in the township.

Although telephone lines were connecting nearby towns as early as 1886, it was not until 1908 that telephones began to be installed in Sydenham Township.

Sydenham Township included the villages of Leith, Annan, Hoath Head, Bognor, Balaclava, and Woodford.

== 2001 amalgamation ==
In 2001, with the amalgamation of various municipalities in Southern Ontario, the Town of Meaford, St. Vincent and Sydenham Township were amalgamated to form one municipality entity. Sydenham Township is now part of the Municipality of Meaford. However, in April 2015, efforts to de-amalgamate, citing an unacceptable tax rise and a propensity to "focus all municipal resources on the urban infrastructure of the former town of Meaford" as reasonings, have been heard by the Meaford Council.
