= Bob Edwards (satirist) =

Canadian politician (1860–1922)

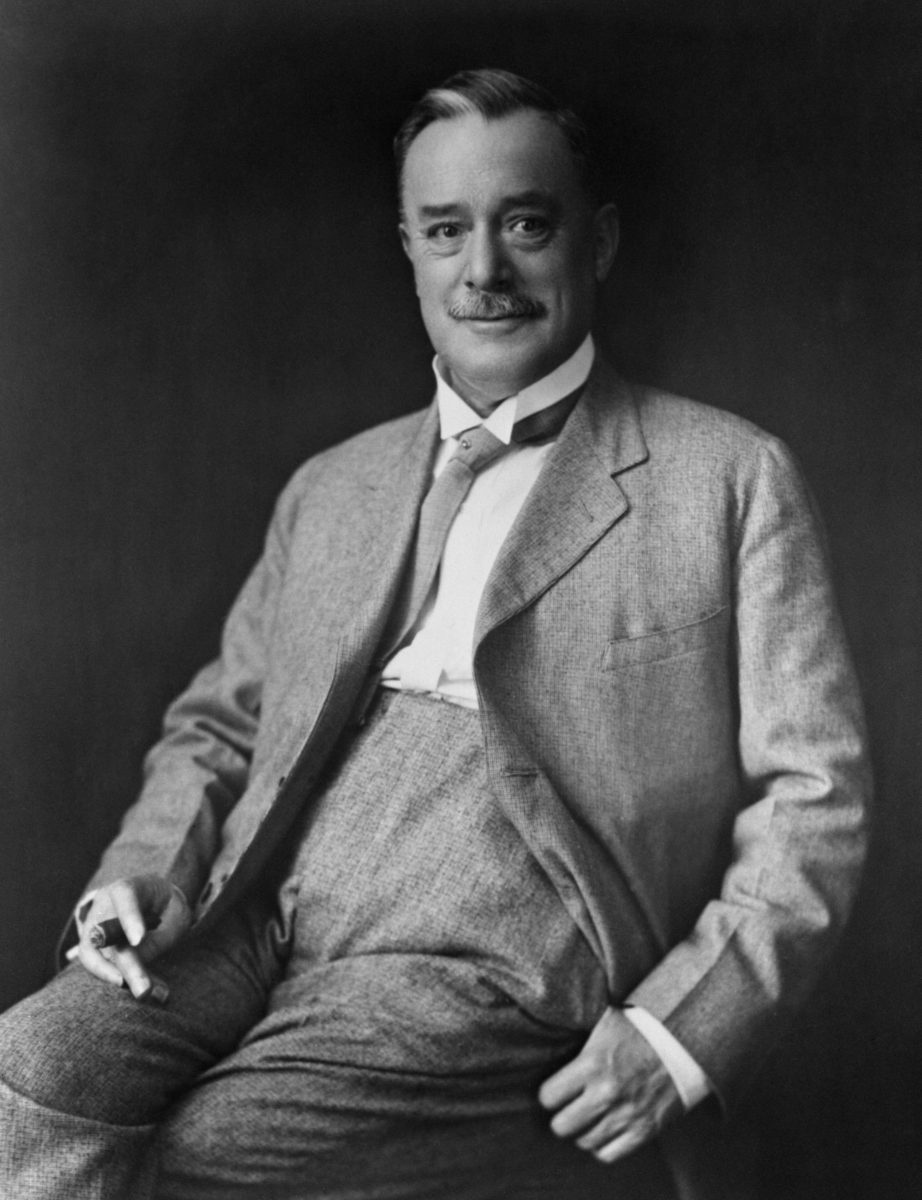
- Born: Robert Chambers Edwards; September 17, 1860; Edinburgh, Scotland
- Died: November 14, 1922 (aged 62); Calgary, Alberta, Canada
- Occupations: journalist, politician
- Relatives: Robert Chambers (grandfather)

Robert Chambers Edwards (September 17, 1860 – November 14, 1922) was a Canadian newsman, humorist, editorialist, entrepreneur, and provincial politician. He is best known, as the writer and publisher of the early 1900s weekly newspaper, the Calgary Eye Opener.

== Personal life and education ==
Edwards was born in Edinburgh, Scotland. Little is known about any siblings, beyond the fact that he had an older brother, Jack. Edwards' mother, Mary Chambers, survived his birth by only a few weeks. His father, Alexander Mackenzie Edwards FRSE, an Edinburgh surgeon and medical author, died in 1868 while on a world cruise. He was raised by unmarried aunts, and attended school in St. Andrews and Edinburgh before spending time at Glasgow University. His mother's father, Dr. Robert Chambers, was a founder of the Scottish publishing house W. & R. Chambers.

in the late 1910s, he sobered up and bought a car. After 25 years in Canada, in 1917, at the age of 57 he married Katherine Penman, a 20-year-old newly arrived from Scotland. In 1921, he was elected MLA for Calgary.

== Career ==
=== Journalism ===
In 1881 and 1882, Edwards put out a tourist periodical, The Channel, aimed at visitors to the French Riviera. He returned to Scotland and worked for a time with the Glasgow city clerk, Sir James David Marwick. Edwards and his brother Jack emigrated to North America in 1892.

Edwards settled in the village of Wetaskiwin and founded a newspaper, the Free Lance, which he published for four years. He then moved to Strathcona, where he published a newspaper until the year 1900.

Edwards worked for the Winnipeg Free Press for a short time, then moved to High River. On March 4, 1902, he began publishing a newspaper there. At first he called his paper The Chinook, but as the paper became known for its satirical content, he changed the name to the Eye Opener. In 1903, he moved operations to Calgary, where the Eye-Opener became widely popular. Through this outlet he poked fun at local politicians, government officials, clergymen and other well-known Calgary residents. He even invented fictitious people to lampoon.

Edwards published negative stories on the Canadian Pacific Railway and those employed by the organization, including R. B. Bennett and CPR Western Superintendent John Stoughton Dennis. Edwards often published stories and photographs of CPR train wrecks, with an emphasis on those occurring in downtown Calgary. Eventually the CPR banned the Eye-Opener from its passenger cars as an "obscene publication".

Dissatisfied with Calgary, he moved to Port Arthur, Ontario, then to Winnipeg, finally returning to Calgary in 1911 and continued with the Eye-Opener.

=== Politics ===
Edwards was elected in the 1921 Alberta general election as an Independent candidate. He was one of five MLAs elected in Calgary by block voting in that election. He advocated for the ready availability of beer and the prohibition of stronger alcoholic beverages, in spite of (or because of) the fact that he himself was an alcoholic.

He died before the issue came to a vote.

== Death and legacy ==
Edwards died November 14, 1922, at the age of 62. He was buried in Calgary's Union Cemetery.

Bob Edwards Junior High School in Calgary, Alberta is named in his honour.

The Bob Edwards Award has been presented annually since 1977 to a provocative Canadian who is not afraid to speak his or her mind. Notable recipients have included Rick Mercer, Margaret Atwood, and Preston Manning. Originally supporting Alberta Theatre Projects as a fundraising luncheon, in 2012 the event moved to the Calgary Public Library Foundation as their signature gala.

The long-running Calgary Eyeopener morning show on CBC Radio One in Calgary is named after Edwards' newspaper.
