= Dominion Labor Party (Alberta) =

- Former provincial party
- Leader: Holmes Jowett, Fred J. White
- Founded: March 29, 1919
- Dissolved: 1942
- Preceded by: Alberta Labor Representation League
- Merged into: Co-operative Commonwealth Federation
- Ideology: Social democracy
- Political position: Left-wing
- National affiliation: Canadian Labour Party

The Dominion Labor Party (Alberta) was a minor political party. It was founded on June 11, 1918 when Edmonton's Labour Representation League renamed itself the Alberta wing of the DLP. Its executive included Mr. Marshall, Mr. Mercer, Mr. Dan Knott, later mayor of the city, White (later Labour MLA), Findlay and Farmilo (both later to be aldermen), and Elmer Roper, later mayor Edmonton.

A branch of the DLP was founded in Calgary in March 1919 as the Federated Labor Party and was renamed the Dominion Labor Party that same year.

The Edmonton area locals renamed themselves locals of the Canadian Labour Party in the early 1920s, but southern Alberta locals such as the one at Lethbridge continued under the Dominion name. Both district organizations were the largest sections of each of their parties, so the terms CLP and Alberta CLP, DLP and Alberta DLP, were almost equivalent. Alberta, having strong radical working-class communities centred around coal mining and other heavy industries, elected a number of Labour MLAs in 1921 and 1926 and two Labour MPs in 1921. This string of successes ended with the massive election of the bank-reformist Social Credit government of William Aberhart in 1935. After the founding of the Co-operative Commonwealth Federation in 1932, the DLP and the CLP were disbanded in 1942.

== Early history ==
The party was founded at a convention held in the Labor temple in Calgary on March 29, 1919. Holmes Jowett was named provisional president. The party was founded to contest elections in federal Alberta ridings and on the provincial level. The party consolidated the former Alberta Labor Representation League and was joined by Centre Calgary Member of the Legislative Assembly Alex Ross. The first executive of the party included former MLA Donald McNabb as First Vice President.

== 1921 Alberta general election ==
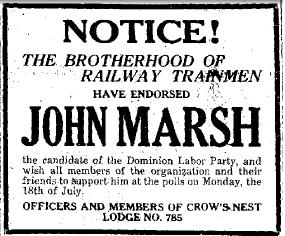
An Advertisement showing an endorsement for Lethbridge candidate John Marsh

The Dominion Labor Party contested the 1921 Alberta general election. The party ran 10 candidates. In addition to its natural opponents, the Liberals and Conservatives, it competed with the Independent Labor Party, which fielded candidates in the election.

Holmes Jowett was party leader. He did not contest a seat in the Legislature, instead spent his time helping his party's candidates.

The party worked in close co-operation with the United Farmers of Alberta – the two parties largely avoiding running candidates against each other.

Four Dominion Labor Party members were elected to the Legislative Assembly – Fred J. White and Alex Ross in Calgary, William Johnston in Medicine Hat. Philip Christophers (a Communist) in the Rocky Mountain constituency. Alex Ross was invited to join the United Farmers cabinet and served as Minister of Public Works.

In the federal election that same year, two Labour candidates were elected in Calgary, William Irvine and Joseph Tweed Shaw. (All the other Alberta ridings elected UFA MPs.)

By 1922, The Dominion Labor Party was only active in Alberta – Labour activities in Manitoba being done under the name Independent Labour Party; in BC under the name Socialist Party of Canada. A new labour body, the Canadian Labour Party, was founded and the Edmonton area branch of the Dominion Labor Party began operating under the new name. The DLP organization in Calgary, Lethbridge and Medicine Hat carried on under the old Dominion Labor name.

Fred J. White led the party in the 1926 provincial election in which five Dominion Labor MLAs were elected: Lionel Gibbs in Edmonton, Christopher Pattinson (Edson), Andrew Smeaton (Lethbridge), White (Calgary) and Philip Christophers (Rocky Mountain constituency).

In the 1930 Alberta general election four of them were re-elected, while Christophers did not stand.

In the next few years, the Dominion Labor Party and the Canadian Labour Party joined with the UFA and other groups to form the Co-operative Commonwealth Federation, however the incumbent UFA government and the DLP and CLP ran in the 1935 Alberta general election. The newly founded Social Credit movement swept the province and defeated the UFA, as well as defeating all three remaining DLP MLAs (Gibbs had died in 1934).

The party only stood one candidate in the 1940 Alberta general election, Enoch Williams, the popular Communist mayor of Blairmore, Alberta, who was defeated in Pincher Creek-Crowsnest. Angus James Morrison ran as a Labour candidate in Edson defeating Social Credit cabinet minister Joseph Unwin.

The CCF stood candidates for the first time in 1940, including Fred J. White who ran under the CCF banner. The CCF received 11% of the vote but won no seats. DLP and CLP clubs formally dissolved into the Alberta CCF in 1942.
