= Hand Hills =

Hand Hills may refer to:

- Hand Hills (Alberta), a range of hills in Alberta, Canada
- Hand Hills (electoral district), a defunct electoral district in Alberta, Canada
