= Acadia-Coronation =

Defunct provincial electoral district in Alberta, Canada

Alberta electoral district

Defunct provincial electoral district
- Legislature: Legislative Assembly of Alberta
- District created: 1940
- District abolished: 1963
- First contested: 1940
- Last contested: 1959

Acadia-Coronation was a provincial electoral district in Alberta, Canada, mandated to return a single member to the Legislative Assembly of Alberta from 1940 to 1963.

== History ==
The Acadia-Coronation electoral district was formed from the Acadia electoral district prior to the 1940 Alberta general election. The district would be dissolved prior to the 1963 Alberta general election and be split into Hand Hills-Acadia and Sedgewick-Coronation electoral districts.

=== Members of the Legislative Assembly (MLAs) ===
Members of the Legislative Assembly for Acadia-Coronation
Assembly	Years	Member	Party
See Acadia electoral district from 1913 to 1940
9th	1940–1944	Clarence E. Gerhart	Social Credit
10th	1944–1948	Clarence E. Gerhart	Social Credit
11th	1948–1952	Clarence E. Gerhart	Social Credit
12th	1952–1955	Clarence E. Gerhart	Social Credit
13th	1955–1959	James Leland Sims	Liberal
14th	1959–1963	Marion Kelts	Social Credit
See Sedgewick-Coronation electoral district from 1963 to 1979 and Hand Hills-Acadia electoral district from 1963 to 1971

== Election results ==
=== 1940 ===
1940 Alberta general election
Party	Candidate	Votes	%	±%
First count
Social Credit	Clarence E. Gerhart	2,163	49.30%	–
Independent	George N. Johnston	1,665	37.95%	–
Co-operative Commonwealth	Mrs. R. Johnston	559	6.46%	–
Total		4,387	–	–
Ballot transfer results
Social Credit	Clarence E. Gerhart	2,297	53.92%	–
Independent	George N. Johnston	1,963	46.08%	–
Total		4,260	–	–
Rejected, spoiled and declined		137	–	–
Eligible electors / turnout		5,927	76.33%	–
Social Credit pickup new district.				
Source(s) Source: "Acadia-Coronation Official Results 1940 Alberta general election". Alberta Heritage Community Foundation. Instant-runoff voting requires a candidate to receive a plurality (greater than 50%) of the votes. As no candidate received a plurality of votes, the bottom candidate was eliminated and their 2nd place votes were applied to both other candidates until one received a plurality

=== 1944 ===
1944 Alberta general election
Party	Candidate	Votes	%	±%
Social Credit	Clarence E. Gerhart	2,930	61.81%	12.51%
Co-operative Commonwealth	Charles Frederickson	1,215	25.63%	19.17%
Independent	John Hallet	595	12.55%	–
Total		4,740	–	–
Rejected, spoiled and declined		98	–	–
Eligible electors / turnout		5,878	82.31%	5.97%
Social Credit hold		Swing		18.09%
Source(s) Source: "Acadia-Coronation Official Results 1944 Alberta general election". Alberta Heritage Community Foundation.

=== 1948 ===
1948 Alberta general election
Party	Candidate	Votes	%	±%
Social Credit	Clarence E. Gerhart	2,332	55.17%	-6.65%
Liberal	Dr. Arthur M. Day	1,254	29.67%	–
Co-operative Commonwealth	Russell A. Johnson	641	15.16%	-10.47%
Total		4,227	–	–
Rejected, spoiled and declined		283	–	–
Eligible electors / turnout		5,744	78.52%	-3.79%
Social Credit hold		Swing		-5.34%
Source(s) Source: "Acadia-Coronation Official Results 1948 Alberta general election". Alberta Heritage Community Foundation.

=== 1952 ===
1952 Alberta general election
Party	Candidate	Votes	%	±%
Social Credit	Clarence E. Gerhart	Acclaimed	–	–
Total		N/A	–	–
Rejected, spoiled and declined		N/A	–	–
Eligible electors / turnout		N/A	N/A	N/A
Social Credit hold		Swing		N/A
Source(s) Source: "Acadia-Coronation Official Results 1952 Alberta general election". Alberta Heritage Community Foundation.

=== 1955 ===
1955 Alberta general election
Party	Candidate	Votes	%	±%
First count
Social Credit	Clarence E. Gerhart	2,026	44.38%	–
Liberal	James Leland Sims	1,932	42.32%	–
Co-operative Commonwealth	L. E. Reiman	607	6.78%	–
Total		4,565	–	–
Ballot transfer results
Liberal	James Leland Sims	2,263	51.61%	–
Social Credit	Clarence E. Gerhart	2,122	48.39%	–
Total		4,385	–	–
Rejected, spoiled and declined		297	–	–
Eligible electors / turnout		5,815	83.63%	–
Liberal gain from Social Credit		Swing		N/A
Source(s) Source: "Acadia-Coronation Official Results 1955 Alberta general election". Alberta Heritage Community Foundation. Instant-runoff voting requires a candidate to receive a plurality (greater than 50%) of the votes. As no candidate received a plurality of votes, the bottom candidate was eliminated and their 2nd place votes were applied to both other candidates until one received a plurality

=== 1959 ===
1959 Alberta general election
Party	Candidate	Votes	%	±%
Social Credit	Marion Kelts	2,450	57.48%	13.10%
Liberal	James Leland Sims	1,408	33.04%	-9.28%
Co-operative Commonwealth	Lester A. Lindgren	404	9.48%	2.70%
Total		4,262	–	–
Rejected, spoiled and declined		11	–	–
Eligible electors / turnout		5,573	76.67%	-5.96%
Social Credit gain from Liberal		Swing		11.96%
Source(s) Source: "Acadia-Coronation Official Results 1959 Alberta general election". Alberta Heritage Community Foundation.

== Plebiscite results ==
=== 1957 liquor plebiscite ===
1957 Alberta liquor plebiscite results: Acadia-Coronation
Question A: Do you approve additional types of outlets for the sale of beer, wine and spirituous liquor subject to a local vote?
Ballot choice	Votes	%
Yes	1,526	53.92%
No	1,304	46.08%
Total votes	2,830	100%
Rejected, spoiled and declined	48	
5,404 eligible electors, turnout 53.26%

On October 30, 1957, a stand-alone plebiscite was held province wide in all 50 of the then current provincial electoral districts in Alberta. The government decided to consult Alberta voters to decide on liquor sales and mixed drinking after a divisive debate in the Legislature. The plebiscite was intended to deal with the growing demand for reforming antiquated liquor control laws.

The plebiscite was conducted in two parts. Question A, asked in all districts, asked the voters if the sale of liquor should be expanded in Alberta, while Question B, asked in a handful of districts within the corporate limits of Calgary and Edmonton, asked if men and women should be allowed to drink together in establishments.

Province wide Question A of the plebiscite passed in 33 of the 50 districts while Question B passed in all five districts. Acadia-Coronation was split on the issue, but voted in favour of the proposal. The district recorded one of the best turnouts in the province, well above the province wide 46% average.

Official district returns were released to the public on December 31, 1957. The Social Credit government in power at the time did not consider the results binding. However the results of the vote led the government to repeal all existing liquor legislation and introduce an entirely new Liquor Act.

Municipal districts lying inside electoral districts that voted against the plebiscite were designated Local Option Zones by the Alberta Liquor Control Board and considered effective dry zones. Business owners who wanted a licence had to petition for a binding municipal plebiscite in order to be granted a licence.

== See also ==
- List of Alberta provincial electoral districts
- Canadian provincial electoral districts
- Acadia (federal electoral district)
