= Sedgewick-Coronation =

Defunct provincial electoral district in Alberta, Canada

Alberta electoral district

Defunct provincial electoral district
- Legislature: Legislative Assembly of Alberta
- District created: 1963
- District abolished: 1979
- First contested: 1963
- Last contested: 1975

Sedgewick-Coronation was a provincial electoral district in Alberta, Canada, established to elect a single member to the Legislative Assembly of Alberta using the first-past-the-post voting method from 1963 to 1979.

The district was named after the towns of Sedgewick and Coronation.

== Members of the Legislative Assembly (MLAs) ==
Members of the Legislative Assembly for Sedgewick-Coronation
Assembly	Years	Member	Party
See Sedgewick electoral district from 1909-1963 and Acadia-Coronation electoral district from 1940-1963
15th	1963–1967	Jack Charles Hillman	Social Credit
16th	1967–1971	Jack Charles Hillman	Social Credit
17th	1971–1975	Ralph Sorenson	Social Credit
18th	1975–1979	Henry Kroeger	Progressive Conservative
See Chinook electoral district from 1979-1997

== Electoral history ==
=== 1963 ===
1963 Alberta general election
Party	Candidate	Votes	%	±%
Social Credit	Jack Charles Hillman	3,999	67.83%	–
Liberal	James Leland Sims	1,368	23.20%	–
New Democratic	Karl O. Peterson	529	8.97%	–
Total		5,896	–	–
Rejected, spoiled and declined		9	–	–
Eligible electors / turnout		8,860	66.65%	–
Social Credit pickup new district.				
Source(s) Source: "Sedgewick-Coronation Official Results 1963 Alberta general election". Alberta Heritage Community Foundation.

=== 1967 ===
1967 Alberta general election
Party	Candidate	Votes	%	±%
Social Credit	Jack Charles Hillman	3,470	59.83%	-8.00%
Progressive Conservative	Ernie Moore	1,103	19.02%	–
New Democratic	Art Bunney	680	11.72%	2.75%
Liberal	Eugene F. Price	547	9.43%	-13.77%
Total		5,800	–	–
Rejected, spoiled and declined		41	–	–
Eligible electors / turnout		8,559	68.24%	–
Social Credit hold		Swing		-1.91%
Source(s) Source: "Sedgewick-Coronation Official Results 1967 Alberta general election". Alberta Heritage Community Foundation.

=== 1971 ===
1971 Alberta general election
Party	Candidate	Votes	%	±%
Social Credit	Ralph Sorenson	2,272	47.67%	-12.16%
Progressive Conservative	Herb Losness	2,005	42.07%	23.05%
New Democratic	Ron Chalmers	489	10.26%	-1.46%
Total		4,766	–	–
Rejected, spoiled and declined		16	–	–
Eligible electors / turnout		19,656	24.33%	–
Social Credit hold		Swing		-17.60%
Source(s) Source: "Sedgewick-Coronation Official Results 1971 Alberta general election". Alberta Heritage Community Foundation.

=== 1975 ===
1975 Alberta general election
Party	Candidate	Votes	%	±%
Progressive Conservative	Henry Kroeger	2,757	56.32%	14.25%
Social Credit	Ralph Sorenson	1,768	36.12%	-11.55%
New Democratic	Gladys Creasy	370	7.56%	-2.70%
Total		4,895	–	–
Rejected, spoiled and declined		15	–	–
Eligible electors / turnout		6,718	73.09%	–
Progressive Conservative gain from Social Credit		Swing		7.30%
Source(s) Source: "Sedgewick-Coronation Official Results 1975 Alberta general election". Alberta Heritage Community Foundation.

== See also ==
- List of Alberta provincial electoral districts
- Canadian provincial electoral districts
