= Clinton French =

Canadian politician

Clinton Keith French

Mayor of Hanna, Alberta

Member of the Legislative Assembly of Alberta
- In office 1959–1963
- Preceded by: Wallace Cross
- Constituency: Hand Hills
- In office 1963–1971
- Constituency: Hand Hills-Acadia
- In office 1971–1975
- Succeeded by: John Butler
- Constituency: Hanna-Oyen

Personal details
- Born: December 24, 1907
- Died: August 8, 1987 (aged 79)
- Party: Social Credit

Clinton Keith French (December 25, 1907 – August 8, 1987) was a municipal and provincial level politician from Alberta, Canada. He served as a member of the Legislative Assembly of Alberta from 1959 to 1975 sitting with the Social Credit caucus in both government and opposition.

== Political career ==
French began his political career by serving as mayor of the town of Hanna, Alberta.

French ran for a seat in the Alberta Legislature in the 1959 Alberta general election. He defeated two other candidates by a wide margin to hold the Hand Hills provincial electoral district for the governing Social Credit Party.

Hand Hills was abolished in the 1963 Alberta general election due to redistribution. French ran for re-election in the new electoral district of Hand Hills-Acadia. He faced a straight fight against Independent candidate Lyal Curry, handily defeating him to win his second term in office.

French ran for a third term in the 1967 Alberta general election. He faced two other candidates and was nearly defeated in a very tight 3 way race. He won by just 535 votes over Progressive Conservative candidate Bill Cross to hold his district.

Hand Hills-Acadia was abolished due to redistribution in the 1971 Alberta general election. French ran in his second tight three way race winning by 15 votes over future MLA John Butler to pick up the new district for the Social Credit party. French retired from provincial politics at the dissolution of the assembly in 1975.

French died in late 1987.
