= Chinook (provincial electoral district) =

Defunct provincial electoral district in Alberta, Canada

Alberta electoral district

Defunct provincial electoral district
- Legislature: Legislative Assembly of Alberta
- District created: 1979
- District abolished: 1996
- First contested: 1979
- Last contested: 1993

Chinook was a provincial electoral district in Alberta, Canada, mandated to return a single member to the Legislative Assembly of Alberta using the first past the post method of voting from 1979 to 1996.

== History ==
The electoral district was created following boundary redistribution for the 1979 Alberta general election from Hanna-Oyen and Sedgewick-Coronation electoral districts. The electoral district would be combined with Drumheller in 1996 to form Drumheller-Chinook.

=== Members of the Legislative Assembly (MLAs) ===
Members of the Legislative Assembly for Chinook
Assembly	Years	Member	Party
See Hanna-Oyen electoral district from 1971-1979 and Sedgewick-Coronation electoral district from 1963-1979
19th	1979–1982	Henry Kroeger	Progressive Conservative
20th	1982–1986	Henry Kroeger	Progressive Conservative
21st	1986–1989	Henry Kroeger	Progressive Conservative
22nd	1989–1993	Shirley McClellan	Progressive Conservative
23rd	1993–1997	Shirley McClellan	Progressive Conservative
See Drumheller-Chinook electoral district from 1997-2004

== Electoral history ==
=== 1970s ===
1979 Alberta general election
Party	Candidate	Votes	%	±%
Progressive Conservative	Henry Kroeger	4,024	66.47%	–
Social Credit	Arlie Reil	1,310	21.64%	–
New Democratic	John W. Oberg	406	6.71%	–
Liberal	Sheila Noonan	314	5.19%	–
Total		6,054	–	–
Rejected, spoiled and declined		33	–	–
Eligible electors / turnout		8,513	71.50%	–
Progressive Conservative pickup new district.				
Source(s) Source: "Chinook Official Results 1979 Alberta general election". Alberta Heritage Community Foundation.

=== 1980s ===
1982 Alberta general election
Party	Candidate	Votes	%	±%
Progressive Conservative	Henry Kroeger	4,837	73.64%	7.18%
Western Canada Concept	Jack Ramsay	1,266	19.28%	–
New Democratic	Gladys Creasy	465	7.08%	0.37%
Total		6,568	–	–
Rejected, spoiled and declined		9	–	–
Eligible electors / turnout		8,783	74.88%	3.38%
Progressive Conservative hold		Swing		4.77%
Source(s) Source: "Chinook Official Results 1982 Alberta general election". Alberta Heritage Community Foundation.

1986 Alberta general election
Party	Candidate	Votes	%	±%
Progressive Conservative	Henry Kroeger	3,796	79.83%	6.19%
New Democratic	Lavera Gladys Creasy	959	20.17%	13.09%
Total		4,755	–	–
Rejected, spoiled and declined		29	–	–
Eligible electors / turnout		9,386	50.97%	–
Progressive Conservative hold		Swing		2.65%
Source(s) Source: "Chinook Official Results 1986 Alberta general election". Alberta Heritage Community Foundation.

1989 Alberta general election
Party	Candidate	Votes	%	±%
Progressive Conservative	Shirley McClellan	3,585	71.12%	-8.71%
New Democratic	H. James Powers	765	15.18%	-4.99%
Liberal	Mel H. Buffalo	691	13.71%	–
Total		5,041	–	–
Rejected, spoiled and declined		10	–	–
Eligible electors / turnout		9,197	54.92%	–
Progressive Conservative hold		Swing		-1.86%
Source(s) Source: "Chinook Official Results 1989 Alberta general election". Alberta Heritage Community Foundation.

=== 1990s ===
1993 Alberta general election
Party	Candidate	Votes	%	±%
Progressive Conservative	Shirley McClellan	4,748	65.01%	-6.11%
Social Credit	Gus Mattheis	1,025	14.03%	–
Liberal	Dianne Anderson	1,015	13.90%	0.19%
Independent	Kristopher Dietrich	293	4.01%	–
New Democratic	Steven Milner	223	3.05%	-12.12%
Total		7,304	–	–
Rejected, spoiled and declined		18	–	–
Eligible electors / turnout		10,553	69.38%	–
Progressive Conservative hold		Swing		-2.48%
Source(s) Source: "Chinook Official Results 1993 Alberta general election". Alberta Heritage Community Foundation.

== See also ==
- List of Alberta provincial electoral districts
- Canadian provincial electoral districts
- Chinook, Alberta, a hamlet in southern Alberta, Canada
