= Sedgewick (provincial electoral district) =

Defunct provincial electoral district in Alberta, Canada

Coordinates: 52.8°N 111.7°W

Alberta electoral district

Defunct provincial electoral district
- Legislature: Legislative Assembly of Alberta
- District created: 1909; 116 years ago
- District abolished: 1963; 62 years ago
- First contested: 1909; 116 years ago
- Last contested: 1959; 66 years ago

Sedgewick was a provincial electoral district in Alberta, Canada, mandated to return a single member to the Legislative Assembly of Alberta from 1909 to 1963.

== History ==
From 1924 to 1956, the district used instant-runoff voting to elect its MLA.

=== Members of the Legislative Assembly (MLAs) ===
Members of the Legislative Assembly for Sedgewick
Assembly	Years	Member	Party
2nd	1909–1913	Charles Stuart	Liberal
3rd	1913–1917	Charles Stuart	Liberal
4th	1917–1921	Charles Stuart	Liberal
5th	1921–1922	Charles Stuart	Liberal
5th	1922–1926	Albert G. Andrews	United Farmers
6th	1926–1930	Albert G. Andrews	United Farmers
7th	1930–1935	Albert G. Andrews	United Farmers
8th	1935–1940	Albert E. Fee	Social Credit
9th	1940–1944	Albert E. Fee	Social Credit
10th	1944–1948	Albert E. Fee	Social Credit
11th	1948–1952	Albert E. Fee	Social Credit
12th	1952–1955	Jack Charles Hillman	Social Credit
13th	1955–1959	Jack Charles Hillman	Social Credit
14th	1959–1963	Jack Charles Hillman	Social Credit
See Sedgewick-Coronation electoral district from 1963-1979

== Election results ==
=== 1909 ===
1909 Alberta general election
Party	Candidate	Votes	%	±%
Liberal	Charles Stewart	Acclaimed	–	–
Total		N/A	–	–
Rejected, spoiled and declined		N/A	–	–
Eligible electors / turnout		N/A	N/A	–
Liberal pickup new district.				
Source(s) Source: "Sedgewick Official Results 1909 Alberta general election". Alberta Heritage Community Foundation.

=== 1912 by-election ===
Alberta provincial by-election, May 27, 1912 Ministerial by-election upon Charles Stewart's appointment as Minister of Municipal Affairs
Party	Candidate	Votes	%	±%
Liberal	Charles Stewart	2,022	67.73%	–
Conservative	William John Blair	963	32.27%	–
Total		2,985	–	–
Rejected, spoiled and declined		N/A	–	–
Eligible electors / turnout		N/A	N/A	–
Liberal hold		Swing		–
Source(s) "By-elections". elections.ab.ca. Elections Alberta.

=== 1913 ===
1913 Alberta general election
Party	Candidate	Votes	%	±%
Liberal	Charles Stewart	889	70.56%	–
Conservative	W. Watson	371	29.44%	–
Total		1,260	–	–
Rejected, spoiled and declined		N/A	–	–
Eligible electors / turnout		N/A	N/A	–
Liberal hold		Swing		N/A
Source(s) Source: "Sedgewick Official Results 1913 Alberta general election". Alberta Heritage Community Foundation.

=== 1917 ===
1917 Alberta general election
Party	Candidate	Votes	%	±%
Liberal	Charles Stewart	1,657	63.05%	-7.50%
Conservative	John Reeve Lavell	971	36.95%	7.50%
Total		2,628	–	–
Rejected, spoiled and declined		N/A	–	–
Eligible electors / turnout		4,442	59.16%	–
Liberal hold		Swing		-7.50%
Source(s) Source: "Sedgewick Official Results 1917 Alberta general election". Alberta Heritage Community Foundation.

=== 1921 ===
1921 Alberta general election
Party	Candidate	Votes	%	±%
Liberal	Charles Stewart	Acclaimed	–	–
Total		N/A	–	–
Rejected, spoiled and declined		N/A	–	–
Eligible electors / turnout		N/A	N/A	–
Liberal hold		Swing		N/A
Source(s) Source: "Sedgewick Official Results 1921 Alberta general election". Alberta Heritage Community Foundation.

=== 1922 by-election ===
July 10, 1922 by-election results (Sedgewick)		Turnout N.A.
United Farmers	Albert Andrews	Acclaimed

=== 1926 ===
1926 Alberta general election
Party	Candidate	Votes	%	±%
United Farmers	Albert G. Andrews	2,264	66.08%	–
Liberal	J. H. Caldwell	694	20.26%	–
Conservative	H. A. Dreany	468	13.66%	–
Total		3,426	–	–
Rejected, spoiled and declined		154	–	–
Eligible electors / turnout		5,074	70.56%	–
United Farmers gain from Liberal		Swing		N/A
Source(s) Source: "Sedgewick Official Results 1926 Alberta general election". Alberta Heritage Community Foundation.

=== 1930 ===
1930 Alberta general election
Party	Candidate	Votes	%	±%
United Farmers	Albert G. Andrews	2,265	73.23%	7.15%
Conservative	W. H. Wallace	828	26.77%	13.11%
Total		3,093	–	–
Rejected, spoiled and declined		111	–	–
Eligible electors / turnout		5,116	62.63%	-7.93%
United Farmers hold		Swing		0.32%
Source(s) Source: "Sedgewick Official Results 1930 Alberta general election". Alberta Heritage Community Foundation.

=== 1935 ===
1935 Alberta general election
Party	Candidate	Votes	%	±%
Social Credit	Albert E. Fee	3,642	71.31%	–
United Farmers	Albert G. Andrews	833	16.31%	-56.92%
Liberal	H. G. Thunell	632	12.38%	–
Total		5,107	–	–
Rejected, spoiled and declined		N/A	–	–
Eligible electors / turnout		4,787	106.68%	44.06%
Social Credit gain from United Farmers		Swing		4.27%
Source(s) Source: "Sedgewick Official Results 1935 Alberta general election". Alberta Heritage Community Foundation.

=== 1940 ===
1940 Alberta general election
Party	Candidate	Votes	%	±%
Social Credit	Albert E. Fee	2,605	53.99%	-17.32%
Independent	John Gair	1,426	29.55%	–
Co-operative Commonwealth	G. Oberg	794	16.46%	–
Total		4,825	–	–
Rejected, spoiled and declined		181	–	–
Eligible electors / turnout		6,611	75.72%	-30.96%
Social Credit hold		Swing		-15.28%
Source(s) Source: "Sedgewick Official Results 1940 Alberta general election". Alberta Heritage Community Foundation.

=== 1944 ===
1944 Alberta general election
Party	Candidate	Votes	%	±%
Social Credit	Albert E. Fee	2,793	62.82%	8.83%
Co-operative Commonwealth	Carl P. Colvin	840	18.89%	2.44%
Independent	Chas. P. Hayes	813	18.29%	-11.27%
Total		4,446	–	–
Rejected, spoiled and declined		86	–	–
Eligible electors / turnout		5,960	76.04%	0.32%
Social Credit hold		Swing		9.75%
Source(s) Source: "Sedgewick Official Results 1944 Alberta general election". Alberta Heritage Community Foundation.

=== 1948 ===
1948 Alberta general election
Party	Candidate	Votes	%	±%
Social Credit	Albert E. Fee	2,867	67.11%	4.29%
Liberal	James Risk Hallum	838	19.62%	–
Co-operative Commonwealth	Alfred Rands	567	13.27%	-5.62%
Total		4,272	–	–
Rejected, spoiled and declined		271	–	–
Eligible electors / turnout		6,348	71.57%	-4.47%
Social Credit hold		Swing		1.78%
Source(s) Source: "Sedgewick Official Results 1948 Alberta general election". Alberta Heritage Community Foundation.

=== 1952 ===
1952 Alberta general election
Party	Candidate	Votes	%	±%
Social Credit	Jack Charles Hillman	2,714	65.22%	-1.89%
Liberal	James Risk Hallum	813	19.54%	-0.08%
Co-operative Commonwealth	Carl P. Colvin	634	15.24%	1.96%
Total		4,161	–	–
Rejected, spoiled and declined		271	–	–
Eligible electors / turnout		6,446	68.76%	-2.81%
Social Credit hold		Swing		-0.90%
Source(s) Source: "Sedgewick Official Results 1952 Alberta general election". Alberta Heritage Community Foundation.

=== 1955 ===
1955 Alberta general election
Party	Candidate	Votes	%	±%
Social Credit	Jack Charles Hillman	2,748	58.71%	-6.52%
Liberal	A. E. Eastly	1,450	30.98%	11.44%
Co-operative Commonwealth	Arthur C. Bunney	483	10.32%	-4.92%
Total		4,681	–	–
Rejected, spoiled and declined		N/A	–	–
Eligible electors / turnout		6,113	76.57%	7.82%
Social Credit hold		Swing		-8.98%
Source(s) Source: "Sedgewick Official Results 1955 Alberta general election". Alberta Heritage Community Foundation.

=== 1959 ===
1959 Alberta general election
Party	Candidate	Votes	%	±%
Social Credit	Jack Charles Hillman	2,805	62.88%	4.17%
Progressive Conservative	Kenneth M. Geddes	796	17.84%	–
Liberal	Mildred G. Redman	541	12.13%	-18.85%
Co-operative Commonwealth	Arthur C. Bunney	319	7.15%	-3.17%
Total		4,461	–	–
Rejected, spoiled and declined		9	–	–
Eligible electors / turnout		6,113	73.12%	-3.45%
Social Credit hold		Swing		8.65%
Source(s) Source: "Sedgewick Official Results 1959 Alberta general election". Alberta Heritage Community Foundation.

== Plebiscite results ==
=== 1957 liquor plebiscite ===
1957 Alberta liquor plebiscite results: Sedgewick
Question A: Do you approve additional types of outlets for the sale of beer, wine and spirituous liquor subject to a local vote?
Ballot choice	Votes	%
No	1,706	55.61%
Yes	1,362	44.39%
Total votes	3,068	100%
Rejected, spoiled and declined	9	
5,921 eligible electors, turnout 51.97%

On October 30, 1957, a stand-alone plebiscite was held province wide in all 50 of the then current provincial electoral districts in Alberta. The government decided to consult Alberta voters to decide on liquor sales and mixed drinking after a divisive debate in the legislature. The plebiscite was intended to deal with the growing demand for reforming antiquated liquor control laws.

The plebiscite was conducted in two parts. Question A, asked in all districts, asked the voters if the sale of liquor should be expanded in Alberta, while Question B, asked in a handful of districts within the corporate limits of Calgary and Edmonton, asked if men and women should be allowed to drink together in establishments.

Province wide Question A of the plebiscite passed in 33 of the 50 districts while Question B passed in all five districts. Sedgewick voted against the proposal by a comfortable margin. The voter turnout in the district was well above the province wide average of 46%.

Official district returns were released to the public on December 31, 1957. The Social Credit government in power at the time did not consider the results binding. However the results of the vote led the government to repeal all existing liquor legislation and introduce an entirely new Liquor Act.

Municipal districts lying inside electoral districts that voted against the plebiscite such as Sedgewick were designated Local Option Zones by the Alberta Liquor Control Board and considered effective dry zones. Business owners who wanted a licence had to petition for a binding municipal plebiscite in order to be granted a licence.

== See also ==
- List of Alberta provincial electoral districts
- Canadian provincial electoral districts
- Sedgewick, a town in central Alberta
