= Albert Fee =

Canadian politician (1880-1957)

Albert Edward Fee
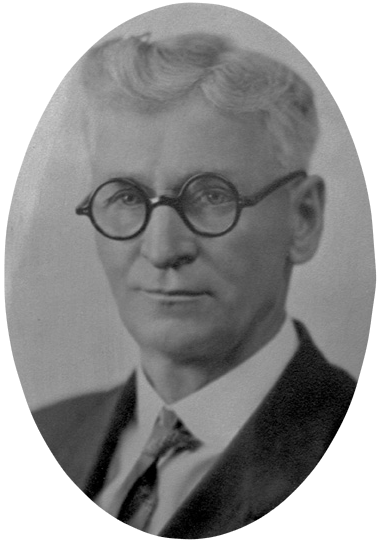

Member of the Legislative Assembly of Alberta
- In office August 22, 1935 – August 5, 1952
- Preceded by: Albert Andrews
- Succeeded by: Jack Hillman
- Constituency: Sedgewick

Personal details
- Born: May 3, 1880
- Died: August 26, 1957 (aged 77) Edmonton, Alberta
- Party: Social Credit
- Occupation: politician

Albert Edward Fee (May 3, 1880 – August 26, 1957) was a provincial politician from Alberta, Canada. He served as a member of the Legislative Assembly of Alberta from 1935 to 1952 sitting with the Social Credit caucus in government.

Fee was born May 3, 1880, to Henry Edward Fee and Sarah Madole, both of Irish descent. He was educated in Bruce, Ontario, and married Stella Findlay on August 16, 1911, whom they had four children together. Fee worked as a hardware dealer and undertaker, and later served as a Councillor for the Village of Killam and school trustee. He was a member of the Elks Lodge and Independent Order of Odd Fellows.

== Political career ==
Fee ran for a seat to the Alberta Legislature as a Social Credit candidate in the electoral district of Sedgewick for the 1935 Alberta general election. He defeated incumbent Albert Andrews with a landslide majority to win the three way race and pickup the seat for his party.

Fee ran for a second term in office in the 1940 Alberta general election. His majority was significantly reduced with the strong opposition from the other two candidates, but he won over half the popular vote to keep his seat on the first vote count.

Fee ran for his third term in office in the 1944 Alberta general election. He slightly increased his popular vote while the total opposition vote collapsed, this resulted in being returned with a landslide majority.

Fee stood for a fourth term in office in the 1948 Alberta general election. For the fourth election in a row he faced a three way race. Fee managed to slightly increase his popular vote easily holding his seat with another landslide.

Fee retired from provincial politics at dissolution of the assembly in 1952.
