= Hanna-Oyen =

Defunct provincial electoral district in Alberta, Canada

Alberta electoral district

Defunct provincial electoral district
- Legislature: Legislative Assembly of Alberta
- District created: 1971
- District abolished: 1979
- First contested: 1971
- Last contested: 1975

Hanna-Oyen was a provincial electoral district in Alberta, Canada, mandated to return a single member to the Legislative Assembly of Alberta from 1971 to 1979.

The electoral district took its name from the town of Hanna and the village of Oyen.

== Members of the Legislative Assembly (MLAs) ==
Members of the Legislative Assembly for Hanna-Oyen
Assembly	Years	Member	Party
See Hand Hills-Acadia electoral district from 1963-1971
17th	1971–1975	Clinton Keith French	Social Credit
18th	1975–1979	John Edward Butler	Progressive Conservative
See Drumheller electoral district from 1979-1997 and Chinook electoral district from 1979-1997

== Election results ==
=== 1971 ===
1971 Alberta general election
Party	Candidate	Votes	%	±%
Social Credit	Clinton Keith French	2,231	45.90%	0.00%
Progressive Conservative	John Edward Butler	2,216	45.59%	0.00%
New Democratic	Gordon Snell	414	8.52%	0.00%
Total		4,861	–	–
Rejected, spoiled and declined		34	–	–
Eligible electors / turnout		5,812	84.22%	–
Social Credit pickup new district.				
Source(s) Source: "Hanna-Oyen Official Results 1971 Alberta general election". Alberta Heritage Community Foundation.

=== 1975 ===
1975 Alberta general election
Party	Candidate	Votes	%	±%
Progressive Conservative	John Edward Butler	2,927	68.77%	23.19%
Social Credit	Alfred Weik	817	19.20%	-26.70%
Liberal	Lyakk Curry	378	8.88%	–
New Democratic	David Urichuk	134	3.15%	-5.37%
Total		4,256	–	–
Rejected, spoiled and declined		10	–	–
Eligible electors / turnout		5,638	75.67%	–
Progressive Conservative gain from Social Credit		Swing		24.63%
Source(s) Source: "Hanna-Oyen Official Results 1975 Alberta general election". Alberta Heritage Community Foundation.

== See also ==
- List of Alberta provincial electoral districts
- Canadian provincial electoral districts
