= Gordon Forster =

Canadian politician (1884-1964)

Gordon Alexander Forster
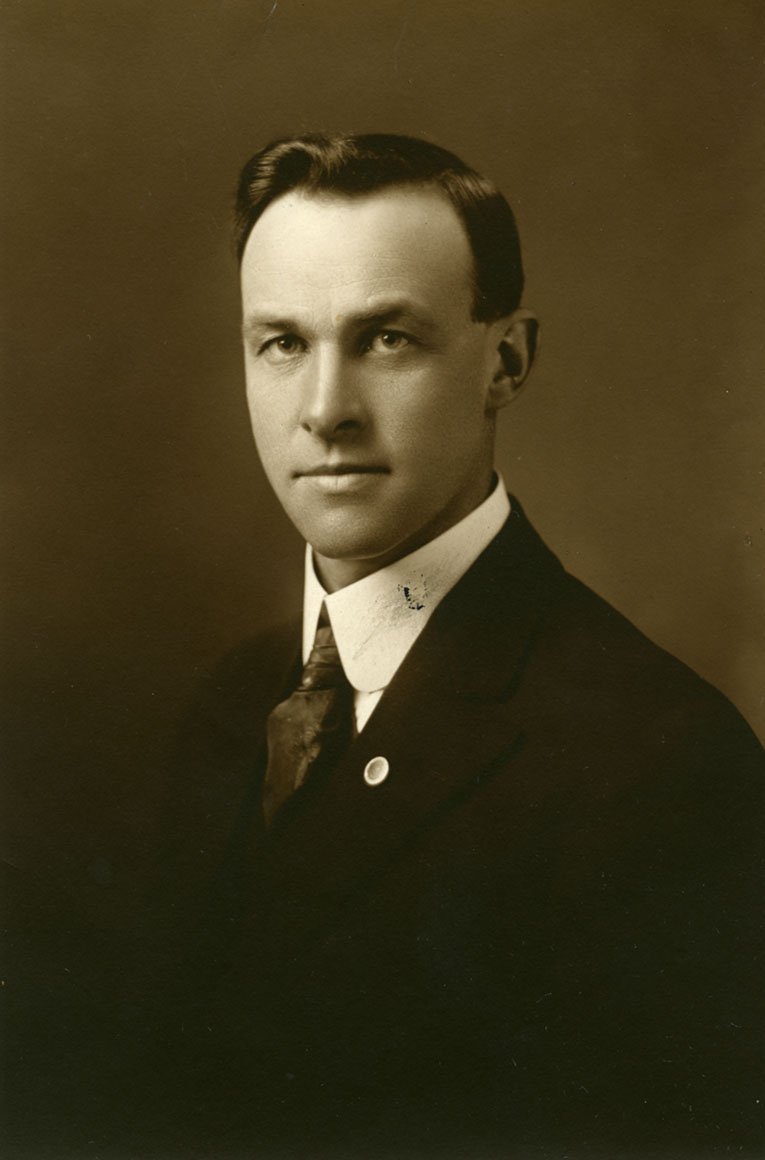

Member of the Legislative Assembly of Alberta
- In office July 18, 1921 – August 22, 1935
- Preceded by: Robert Eaton
- Succeeded by: Wallace Cross
- Constituency: Hand Hills

Personal details
- Born: April 30, 1884 York, Ontario, Canada
- Died: July 23, 1964 (aged 80) Nateby, Alberta
- Party: United Farmers
- Occupation: politician

Gordon Alexander Forster (April 30, 1884 – July 23, 1964) was a provincial politician from Alberta, Canada. He served as a member of the Legislative Assembly of Alberta from 1921 to 1935 sitting with the United Farmers caucus in government.

== Political career ==
Forster ran for a seat to the Alberta Legislature in the 1921 Alberta general election as a United Farmers candidate in the electoral district of Hand Hills. He defeated incumbent Robert Eaton in a two-way race with one of the biggest margins of victory polled in the election.

Forster ran for re-nomination at a party convention held on June 5, 1926 in Hanna, Alberta. He defeated three other candidates to run for the United Farmers. He ran for a second term in office in the 1926 Alberta general election. His popular vote was almost cut in half, but he still held his seat easily defeating two other candidates.

Forster ran for a third term in office in the 1930 Alberta general election. He would survive a two-way race hanging on to his seat in a close contest over Independent candidate J.L. Newman.

Forster retired from provincial office at dissolution of the Assembly in 1935 and died in 1964.
