= Clarence Gerhart =

Canadian politician (1897–1965)

Member of the Legislative Assembly of Alberta
- In office 1940–1955
- Preceded by: District established
- Succeeded by: James Leland Sims
- Constituency: Acadia-Coronation

Personal details
- Born: 24 December 1897 Novar, Ontario
- Died: 10 May 1965 (aged 67) Vancouver, British Columbia
- Party: Social Credit
- Spouse: Mary Gelina Chambers
- Children: Edgar Gerhart
- Education: University of Alberta
- Occupation: Chemist, Accountant

Clarence Edgar Gerhart (24 December 1897 – 10 May 1965) was a provincial politician from Alberta, Canada. He served as a member of the Legislative Assembly of Alberta from 1940 to 1955, sitting with the Social Credit caucus in government.

== Early life ==
Gerhart was born in Novar, Ontario in 1897 to Henry Franklin Gerhart and Lillian Thomas. He attended the University of Alberta where he earned a Ph.C., and worked as a chemist and accountant. Gerhart would be married on 29 June 1921, to Mary Gelina Chambers and have three children, including Edgar Gerhart who would serve in the Alberta Legislature with his father.

Gerhart would serve as a lieutenant in the Royal Air Force during the First World War in 1918, and a captain in The King's Own Calgary Regiment during the Second World War from 1941 to 1946.

== Political career ==
Gerhart would be elected Mayor of Coronation, Alberta three times.

Clarence Gerhart would contest the 1940 Alberta general election in the Acadia-Coronation electoral district as a member of the Social Credit Party, defeating Independent candidate George N. Johnston, who previously served as Speaker of the Legislative Assembly and Cooperative Commonwealth candidate Mrs. R. Johnston on a run-off count. Gerhart would subsequently be re-elected three more times, again in 1944, 1948, and acclaimed in 1952. Gerhart would be defeated in the 1955 Alberta general election by Alberta Liberal Party candidate James Leland Sims on a run-off count.

Gerhart would serve in Premier Ernest Manning's cabinet in the role of Minister of Municipal Affairs from 1943 to 1954, Minister of Trade and Industry from 1944 to 1948, Provincial Secretary from 1948 to 1955, and Provincial Treasurer from 1954 to 1955.
