= Robert Eaton (politician) =

Canadian politician

Robert Berry Eaton
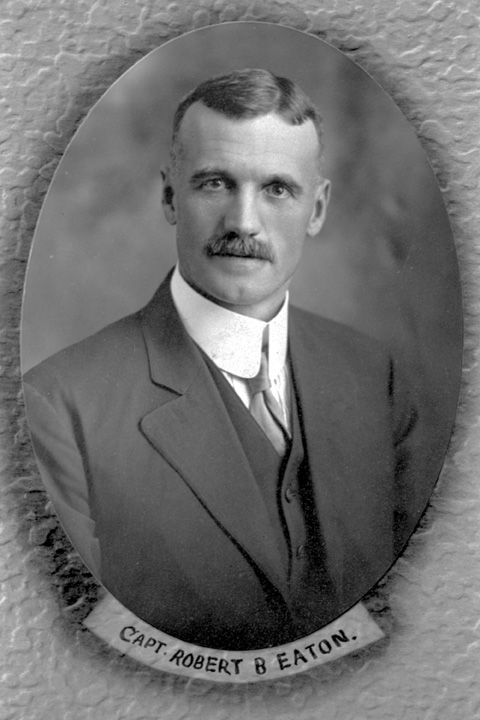

Member of the Legislative Assembly of Alberta
- In office March 25, 1913 – July 18, 1921
- Preceded by: New District
- Succeeded by: Gordon Forster
- Constituency: Hand Hills

Personal details
- Born: August 5, 1871 Truro, Nova Scotia, Canada
- Died: June 13, 1964 (aged 92) Sidney, British Columbia, Canada
- Party: provincial Liberal
- Other political affiliations: federal Liberal
- Occupation: farmer, service man and politician

Military service
- Allegiance: Canada
- Years of service: 1915-1917
- Rank: Major
- Unit: 50th Battalion
- Battles/wars: World War I

Robert Berry Eaton (August 5, 1871 – June 13, 1964) was a farmer, service man and provincial politician from Alberta, Canada. He served as a member of the Legislative Assembly of Alberta from 1913 to 1921.

== Political career ==
Eaton ran for a seat to the Alberta Legislature for the first time in the 1913 Alberta general election. He defeated former Conservative leader and MLA Albert Robertson in a closely contested race.

Eaton was acclaimed to his second term in the 1917 Alberta general election under section 38 of the Elections Act. The section stipulated that an incumbent member may not be challenged and returned automatically in his district if he is involved with the Canadian Forces overseas in World War I.

Eaton ran for a third term in the 1921 Alberta general election. He would be defeated in a landslide by United Farmers candidate Gordon Forster.

Eaton attempted to run for a seat in the House of Commons of Canada as a Liberal candidate in the 1925 Canadian federal election in the electoral district of Acadia. He would be defeated by Incumbent member Robert Gardiner finishing second in the three-way race.
