= John Edward Butler =

Canadian politician

John "Jack" Edward Butler

Member of the Legislative Assembly of Alberta
- In office March 26, 1975 – March 14, 1979
- Preceded by: Clinton French
- Succeeded by: District abolished
- Constituency: Hanna-Oyen

Personal details
- Born: October 21, 1916
- Died: November 4, 1999 (aged 83)
- Party: Progressive Conservative

John Edward Butler (October 21, 1916 – November 4, 1999) was a provincial level politician from Alberta, Canada. He served as a member of the Legislative Assembly of Alberta from 1975 to 1979 sitting with the governing Progressive Conservative caucus.

== Political career ==
Butler ran for a seat to the Alberta Legislature in the 1971 Alberta general election in the new electoral district of Hanna-Oyen as a Progressive Conservative candidate. He nearly defeated incumbent Social Credit MLA Clinton French, finishing a close second in the three way race and losing by just 15 votes.

Butler made a second run for a seat to the legislature in the 1975 Alberta general election. This time he won the electoral district of Hanna-Oyen to pick it up for the governing Progressive Conservative party improving his popular slightly while the opposition vote collapsed. Butler retired from provincial politics at dissolution of the assembly in 1979.

He died on November 4, 1999.
