= Ralph Sorenson =

Canadian politician (1927–2020)

Ralph Andrews Sorenson

Member of the Legislative Assembly of Alberta
- In office August 30, 1971 – March 25, 1975
- Preceded by: Jack Hillman
- Succeeded by: Henry Kroeger
- Constituency: Sedgewick-Coronation

Personal details
- Born: March 27, 1927 Alberta, Canada
- Died: May 15, 2020 (aged 93) Killam, Alberta, Canada
- Party: Social Credit
- Spouse: Jean Rancier (m. 1954)
- Occupation: farmer, politician

Ralph Andrews Sorenson (March 27, 1927 – May 15, 2020) was a politician from Alberta, Canada. He served in the Legislative Assembly of Alberta from 1971 to 1975 as a member of the Social Credit caucus in the official opposition.

== Political career ==
Sorenson ran for a seat to the Alberta Legislature in the 1971 general election. He won by less than 300 votes over Progressive Conservative candidate Herb Losness in the electoral district of Sedgewick-Coronation. In the 1975 general election, he was defeated by Progressive Conservative candidate Henry Kroeger.
