= Hand Hills (electoral district) =

Defunct provincial electoral district in Alberta, Canada

Coordinates: 51.488°N 112.170°W

Alberta electoral district

Defunct provincial electoral district
- Legislature: Legislative Assembly of Alberta
- District created: 1913
- District abolished: 1963
- First contested: 1913
- Last contested: 1959

Hand Hills was a provincial electoral district in Alberta, Canada, mandated to return a single member to the Legislative Assembly of Alberta from 1913 to 1963. It was abolished prior to the 1963 Alberta general election due to redistribution, in favour of the new electoral district of Hand Hills-Acadia.

The electoral district took its name from Hand Hills.

From 1924 to 1956, the district used instant-runoff voting to elect its MLA.

== Members of the Legislative Assembly (MLAs) ==
Members of the Legislative Assembly for Hand Hills
Assembly	Years	Member	Party
See Stettler electoral district from 1909-1913
3rd	1913–1917	Robert Eaton	Liberal
4th	1917–1921	Robert Eaton	Liberal
5th	1921–1926	Gordon Forster	United Farmers
6th	1926–1930	Gordon Forster	United Farmers
7th	1930–1935	Gordon Forster	United Farmers
8th	1935–1940	Wallace Warren Cross	United Farmers
9th	1940–1944	Wallace Warren Cross	United Farmers
10th	1944–1948	Wallace Warren Cross	United Farmers
11th	1948–1952	Wallace Warren Cross	United Farmers
12th	1952–1955	Wallace Warren Cross	United Farmers
13th	1955–1959	Wallace Warren Cross	United Farmers
14th	1959–1963	Clinton French	United Farmers
See Hand Hills-Acadia electoral district from 1963-1971

== Election results ==
=== 1910s ===
1913 Alberta general election
Party	Candidate	Votes	%	±%
Liberal	Robert Eaton	962	53.36%	–
Conservative	Albert J. Robertson	841	46.64%	–
Total		1,803	–	–
Rejected, spoiled and declined		N/A	–	–
Eligible electors / turnout		2,936	N/A	–
Liberal pickup new district.				
Source(s) Source: "Hand Hills Official Results 1913 Alberta general election". Alberta Heritage Community Foundation.

1917 Alberta general election
Party	Candidate	Votes	%	±%
Liberal	Robert Eaton	Acclaimed	–	–
Total		N/A	–	–
Rejected, spoiled and declined		N/A	–	–
Eligible electors / turnout		N/A	N/A	–
Liberal hold		Swing		N/A
Source(s) Source: "Hand Hills Official Results 1917 Alberta general election". Alberta Heritage Community Foundation. One of eleven Members of the Legislative Assembly of Alberta acclaimed under The Elections Act Section 38, which stipulated that any member of the 3rd Alberta Legislative Assembly would be guaranteed re-election, with no contest held, if the member joined for wartime service in the First World War. An Act amending The Election Act respecting Members of the Legislative Assembly on Active Service., SA 1917, c. 38

=== 1920s ===
1921 Alberta general election
Party	Candidate	Votes	%	±%
United Farmers	Gordon Forster	4,252	72.87%	–
Liberal	Robert Eaton	1,583	27.13%	–
Total		5,835	–	–
Rejected, spoiled and declined		N/A	–	–
Eligible electors / turnout		8,291	70.38%	–
United Farmers gain from Liberal		Swing		N/A
Source(s) Source: "Hand Hills Official Results 1921 Alberta general election". Alberta Heritage Community Foundation.

1926 Alberta general election
Party	Candidate	Votes	%	±%
United Farmers	Gordon Forster	2,665	66.08%	-6.79%
Liberal	W. G. Anderson	778	19.29%	-7.84%
Conservative	C. L. Sitlington	590	14.63%	–
Total		4,033	–	–
Rejected, spoiled and declined		312	–	–
Eligible electors / turnout		6,296	69.01%	–
United Farmers hold		Swing		0.52%
Source(s) Source: "Hand Hills Official Results 1926 Alberta general election". Alberta Heritage Community Foundation.

=== 1930s ===
1930 Alberta general election
Party	Candidate	Votes	%	±%
United Farmers	Gordon Forster	2,689	64.08%	-1.99%
Independent	J. L. Newman	1,507	35.92%	–
Total		4,196	–	–
Rejected, spoiled and declined		173	–	–
Eligible electors / turnout		5,880	74.30%	–
United Farmers hold		Swing		-9.31%
Source(s) Source: "Hand Hills Official Results 1930 Alberta general election". Alberta Heritage Community Foundation.

1935 Alberta general election: Hand Hills
Party	Candidate	Votes	%	±%
Social Credit	Wallace Warren Cross	3,270	72.20%	–
United Farmers	C.W. Robinson	707	15.61%	-48.47%
Liberal	Wm. Gibson	552	12.19%	–
Total		4,529	–	–
Rejected, spoiled and declined		102	–	–
Eligible electors / turnout		5,352	86.53%	–
Social Credit gain from United Farmers		Swing		14.21%
Source(s) Source: "Hand Hills Official Results 1935 Alberta general election". Alberta Heritage Community Foundation.

=== 1940s ===
1940 Alberta general election: Hand Hills
Party	Candidate	Votes	%	±%
Social Credit	Wallace Warren Cross	2,547	56.39%	-15.81%
Independent	Wm. McAllister	1,970	43.61%	–
Total		4,517	–	–
Rejected, spoiled and declined		147	–	–
Eligible electors / turnout		6,179	75.48%	–
Social Credit hold		Swing		-21.91%
Source(s) Source: "Hand Hills Official Results 1940 Alberta general election". Alberta Heritage Community Foundation.

1944 Alberta general election: Hand Hills
Party	Candidate	Votes	%	±%
Social Credit	Wallace Warren Cross	3,125	68.98%	12.60%
Co-operative Commonwealth	Wm. P. Roberts	873	19.27%	–
Independent	William McAllister	532	11.74%	-31.87%
Total		4,530	–	–
Rejected, spoiled and declined		50	–	–
Eligible electors / turnout		5,688	80.52%	–
Social Credit hold		Swing		18.47%
Source(s) Source: "Hand Hills Official Results 1944 Alberta general election". Alberta Heritage Community Foundation.

1948 Alberta general election: Hand Hills
Party	Candidate	Votes	%	±%
Social Credit	Wallace Warren Cross	2,773	63.31%	-5.67%
Liberal	Joseph H. Cramer	1,607	36.69%	–
Total		4,380	–	–
Rejected, spoiled and declined		N/A	–	–
Eligible electors / turnout		5,550	78.92%	–
Social Credit hold		Swing		-11.55%
Source(s) Source: "Hand Hills Official Results 1948 Alberta general election". Alberta Heritage Community Foundation.

=== 1950s ===
1952 Alberta general election: Hand Hills
Party	Candidate	Votes	%	±%
Social Credit	Wallace Warren Cross	2,806	71.02%	7.71%
Liberal	Fred W. Slemp	1,145	28.98%	-7.71%
Total		3,951	–	–
Rejected, spoiled and declined		237	–	–
Eligible electors / turnout		6,073	68.96%	–
Social Credit hold		Swing		7.71%
Source(s) Source: "Hand Hills Official Results 1952 Alberta general election". Alberta Heritage Community Foundation.

1955 Alberta general election: Hand Hills
Party	Candidate	Votes	%	±%
Social Credit	Wallace Warren Cross	2,685	57.95%	-13.07%
Liberal	Wm. Stainton	1,666	35.96%	6.98%
Independent	Arthur D. Brown	282	6.09%	–
Total		4,633	–	–
Rejected, spoiled and declined		260	–	–
Eligible electors / turnout		5,934	82.46%	–
Social Credit hold		Swing		-10.02%
Source(s) Source: "Hand Hills Official Results 1955 Alberta general election". Alberta Heritage Community Foundation.

1959 Alberta general election: Hand Hills
Party	Candidate	Votes	%	±%
Social Credit	Clinton French	3,052	66.13%	8.18%
Progressive Conservative	William J. Newman	1,074	23.27%	–
Liberal	Val Gobel	489	10.60%	-25.36%
Total		4,615	–	–
Rejected, spoiled and declined		10	–	–
Eligible electors / turnout		5,934	77.94%	–
Social Credit hold		Swing		10.43%
Source(s) Source: "Hand Hills Official Results 1959 Alberta general election". Alberta Heritage Community Foundation.

== Plebiscite results ==
=== 1957 liquor plebiscite ===
1957 Alberta liquor plebiscite results: Hand Hills
Question A: Do you approve additional types of outlets for the sale of beer, wine and spirituous liquor subject to a local vote?
Ballot choice	Votes	%
Yes	1,669	57.87%
No	1,215	42.13%
Total votes	2,884	100%
Rejected, spoiled and declined	19	
5,504 eligible electors, turnout 52.74%

On October 30, 1957, a stand-alone plebiscite was held province wide in all 50 of the then current provincial electoral districts in Alberta. The government decided to consult Alberta voters to decide on liquor sales and mixed drinking after a divisive debate in the legislature. The plebiscite was intended to deal with the growing demand for reforming antiquated liquor control laws.

The plebiscite was conducted in two parts. Question A, asked in all districts, asked the voters if the sale of liquor should be expanded in Alberta, while Question B, asked in a handful of districts within the corporate limits of Calgary and Edmonton, asked if men and women should be allowed to drink together in establishments.

Province wide Question A of the plebiscite passed in 33 of the 50 districts, while Question B passed in all five districts. Hand Hills voted in favour of the proposal with a solid majority. Voter turnout in the district was good, as it was significantly higher than the province wide average of 46%.

Official district returns were released to the public on December 31, 1957. The Social Credit government in power at the time did not consider the results binding. However the results of the vote led the government to repeal all existing liquor legislation and introduce an entirely new Liquor Act.

Municipal districts lying inside electoral districts that voted against the plebiscite were designated Local Option Zones by the Alberta Liquor Control Board and considered effective dry zones. Business owners who wanted a licence had to petition for a binding municipal plebiscite in order to be granted a licence.

== See also ==
- List of Alberta provincial electoral districts
- Canadian provincial electoral districts
