= Hand Hills-Acadia =

Defunct provincial electoral district in Alberta, Canada

Coordinates: 51.488°N 112.170°W

Alberta electoral district

Defunct provincial electoral district
- Legislature: Legislative Assembly of Alberta
- District created: 1963
- District abolished: 1971
- First contested: 1963
- Last contested: 1967

Hand Hills-Acadia was a provincial electoral district in Alberta, Canada, mandated to return a single member to the Legislative Assembly of Alberta using the first-past-the-post election system from 1963 to 1971. It was formed prior to the 1963 Alberta general election from the previous electoral district of Hand Hills. The electoral district took its name from the Hand Hills.

== Members of the Legislative Assembly (MLAs) ==
Members of the Legislative Assembly for Hand Hills-Acadia
Assembly	Years	Member	Party
See Hand Hills electoral district from 1913-1963
15th	1963–1967	Clinton Keith French	Social Credit
16th	1967–1971	Clinton Keith French	Social Credit
See Drumheller electoral district from 1971-1997 and Hanna-Oyen from 1971-1979

== Election results ==
=== 1963 ===
1963 Alberta general election
Party	Candidate	Votes	%	±%
Social Credit	Clinton Keith French	3,215	61.98%	–
Independent	Lyal Alex. Curry	1,972	38.02%	–
Total		5,187	–	–
Rejected, spoiled and declined		18	–	–
Eligible electors / turnout		7,410	70.24%	–
Social Credit pickup new district.				
Source(s) Source: "Hand Hills-Acadia Official Results 1963 Alberta general election". Alberta Heritage Community Foundation.

=== 1967 ===
1967 Alberta general election
Party	Candidate	Votes	%	±%
Social Credit	Clinton Keith French	2,675	50.29%	-11.69%
Progressive Conservative	Bill Cross	2,140	40.23%	–
New Democratic	Ralph G. Jorgenson	504	9.48%	–
Total		5,319	–	–
Rejected, spoiled and declined		13	–	–
Eligible electors / turnout		7,102	75.08%	–
Social Credit hold		Swing		-6.95%
Source(s) Source: "Hand Hills-Acadia Official Results 1967 Alberta general election". Alberta Heritage Community Foundation.

== See also ==
- List of Alberta provincial electoral districts
- Canadian provincial electoral districts
- Acadia, a rural municipality in Alberta
