= Albert Andrews =

Canadian politician (1881-1960)

Albert George Andrews
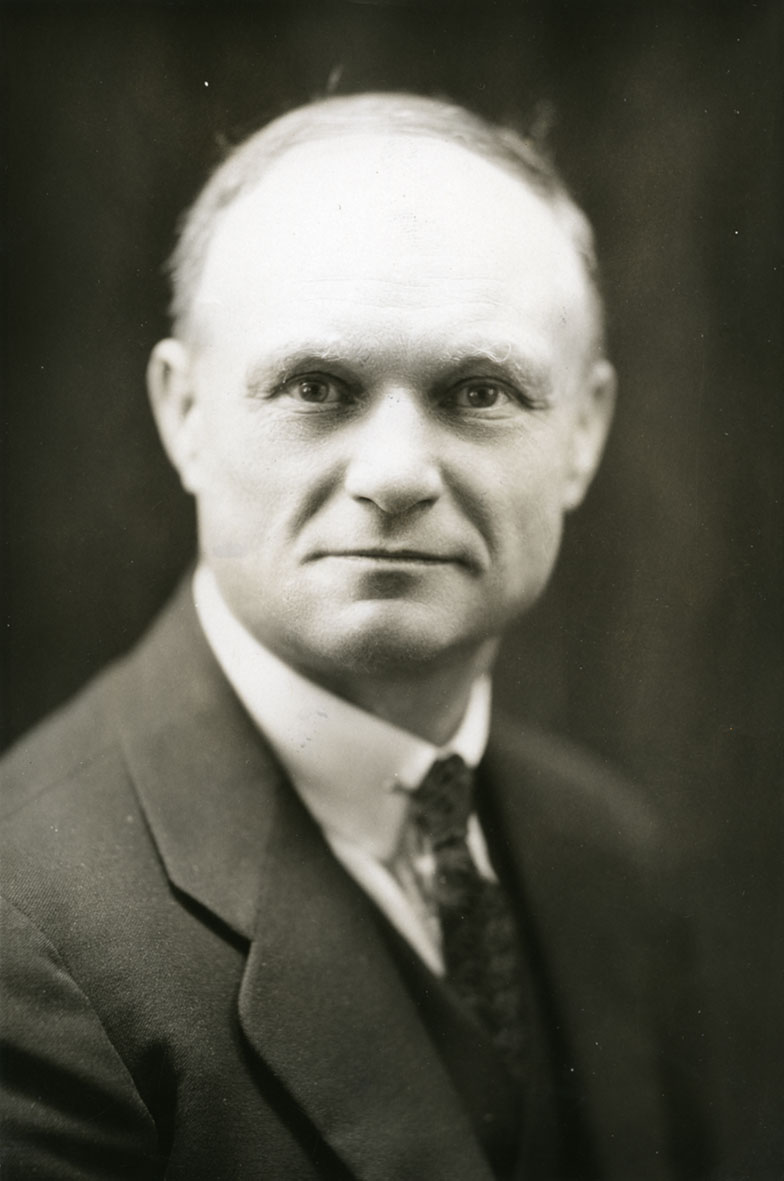

Member of the Legislative Assembly of Alberta
- In office July 3, 1922 – August 22, 1935
- Preceded by: Charles Stewart
- Succeeded by: Albert Fee
- Constituency: Sedgewick

Personal details
- Born: September 13, 1881 Berkhampstead, Hertfordshire, England
- Died: October 25, 1960 (aged 79) Edmonton, Alberta
- Party: United Farmers
- Occupation: politician

Albert George Andrews (September 13, 1881 – October 25, 1960) was a provincial politician from Alberta, Canada. He served as a member of the Legislative Assembly of Alberta from 1922 to 1935 sitting with the United Farmers caucus in government.

== Political career ==
Andrews ran for a seat to the Alberta Legislature in a by-election that was supposed to be held on July 10, 1922. He stood as a candidate under the United Farmers banner in the electoral district of Sedgewick that was vacated by former Premier Charles Stewart. Andrews was acclaimed on nomination day July 3, 1922, when no other candidates came forward.

Andrews ran for a second term in the 1926 Alberta general election. He stood in his first contested race against two other candidates taking a landslide majority.

Andrews ran for a third term in the 1930 Alberta general election. He contested a straight race against Conservative candidate W.H. Wallace. Andrews increased his popular total by a single vote from the last election to easily hold the district.

Andrews ran for a fourth term in the 1935 Alberta general election. He was defeated finishing a distant second in the three-way race losing to Social Credit candidate Albert Fee.
