= Wallace Warren Cross =

Canadian politician

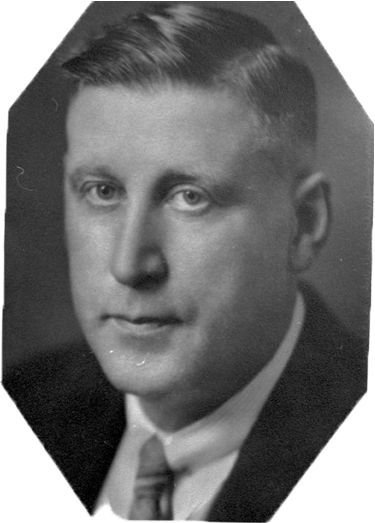

Member of the Legislative Assembly of Alberta
- In office 1935–1959
- Preceded by: Gordon Forster
- Succeeded by: Clinton Keith French
- Constituency: Hand Hills

Personal details
- Born: September 23, 1887 Barrie, Ontario
- Died: August 4, 1973 (aged 85) Edmonton, Alberta
- Party: Social Credit

Wallace Warren Cross (September 23, 1887 – August 4, 1973) was a medical doctor and long-serving politician from Alberta, Canada.

Cross was elected in the 1935 Alberta general election for the Alberta Social Credit Party for the Hand Hills district. He served six terms in office, retiring from provincial politics in 1959.

Cross became minister of health under Premier William Aberhart and strongly enhanced the powers of the Alberta Eugenics Board by removing the requirement to obtain consent from individuals to be sterilized.

During his time as minister, Cross also opened a series of cancer clinics across Alberta, and actively focused the Department of Health's resources on cancer treatment. He died in Edmonton in 1973.

The Cross Cancer Institute, which opened in 1968, is named in his honour.
