= Charles Stewart (premier) =

Canadian politician (1868–1946)

The Honourable Charles Stewart PC
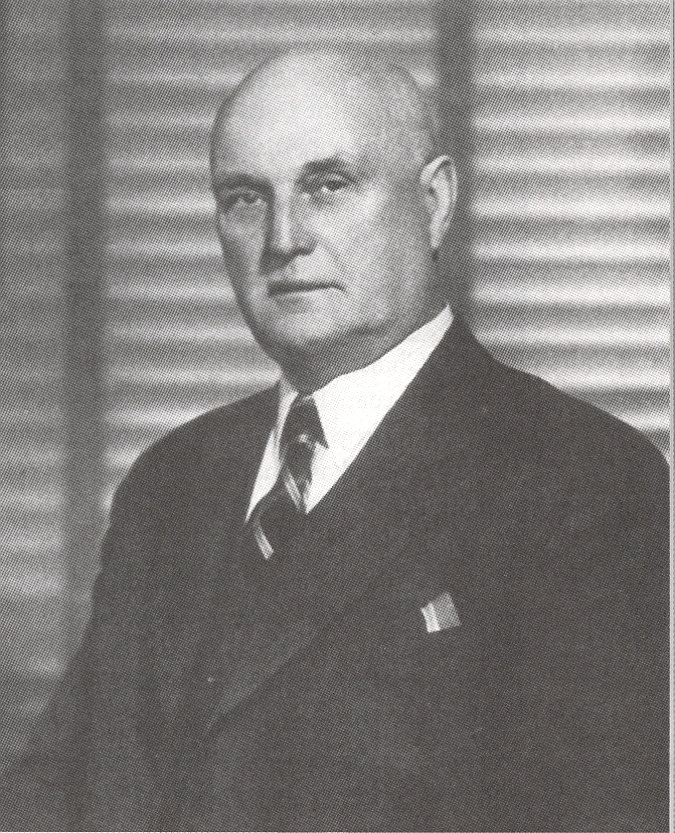

3rd Premier of Alberta
- In office October 30, 1917 – August 13, 1921
- Monarch: George V
- Lieutenant Governor: Robert Brett
- Preceded by: Arthur Sifton
- Succeeded by: Herbert Greenfield

Member of the Legislative Assembly of Alberta for Sedgewick
- In office March 22, 1909 – February 28, 1922
- Preceded by: District established
- Succeeded by: Albert Andrews

Alberta Minister of Railways and Telephones
- In office October 16, 1917 – August 31, 1921
- Preceded by: Arthur Sifton
- Succeeded by: Vernor Smith

Alberta Provincial Secretary
- In office October 16, 1917 – August 28, 1918
- Preceded by: Archibald J. McLean
- Succeeded by: Wilfrid Gariépy

Alberta Minister of Public Works
- In office November 28, 1913 – October 16, 1917
- Preceded by: Charles R. Mitchell
- Succeeded by: Archibald J. McLean

Alberta Minister of Municipal Affairs
- In office May 4, 1912 – November 29, 1913
- Preceded by: New position
- Succeeded by: Wilfrid Gariépy

Member of the House of Commons of Canada for Edmonton West
- In office October 29, 1925 – October 14, 1935
- Preceded by: Donald MacBeth Kennedy
- Succeeded by: James Angus MacKinnon

Member of the House of Commons of Canada for Argenteuil
- In office February 28, 1922 – October 29, 1925
- Preceded by: Peter Robert McGibbon
- Succeeded by: George Perley

Canadian Minister of the Interior and Mines
- In office December 29, 1921 – June 29, 1926
- Preceded by: James Alexander Lougheed
- Succeeded by: Henry Herbert Stevens
- In office September 25, 1926 – August 6, 1930
- Preceded by: R. B. Bennett
- Succeeded by: Wesley Ashton Gordon

Personal details
- Born: August 26, 1868 Strabane, Wentworth County, Ontario, Canada
- Died: December 6, 1946 (aged 78) Ottawa, Ontario, Canada
- Party: Alberta Liberal Party; Liberal Party of Canada
- Spouse: Jane Russell Sneath
- Children: 8
- Profession: Farmer

Charles Stewart PC (August 26, 1868 – December 6, 1946) was a Canadian politician who served as the third premier of Alberta from 1917 until 1921. Born in Strabane, Ontario, in then Wentworth County (now part of Hamilton), Stewart was a farmer who moved west to Alberta after his farm was destroyed by a storm. There he became active in politics and was elected to the Legislative Assembly of Alberta in the 1909 election. He served as Minister of Public Works and Minister of Municipal Affairs—the first person to hold the latter position in Alberta—in the government of Arthur Sifton. When Sifton left provincial politics in 1917 to join the federal cabinet, Stewart was named his replacement.

As premier, Stewart tried to hold together his Liberal Party, which was divided by the Conscription Crisis of 1917. He endeavoured to enforce prohibition of alcoholic beverages, which had been enshrined in law by a referendum during Sifton's premiership, but found that the law was not widely enough supported to be effectively policed. His government took over several of the province's financially troubled railroads, and guaranteed bonds sold to fund irrigation projects. Several of these policies were the result of lobbying by the United Farmers of Alberta (UFA), with which Stewart enjoyed good relations; even so, the UFA was politicized during Stewart's premiership and ran candidates in the 1921 election. Unable to match the UFA's appeal to rural voters, Stewart's government was defeated at the polls and he was succeeded as premier by Herbert Greenfield.

After leaving provincial politics, Stewart was invited to join the federal cabinet of William Lyon Mackenzie King, in which he served as Minister of the Interior and Mines. In this capacity he signed, on behalf of the federal government, an agreement that transferred control of Alberta's natural resources from Ottawa to the provincial government—a concession he had been criticized for being unable to negotiate as Premier. Stewart also served as Superintendent-General of Indian Affairs between 1921-1930 and held the position of Minister of Immigration and Colonization for a short period in 1925 - 1926. He served in King's cabinet until 1930, when the King government was defeated, but remained a member of Parliament until he lost his seat in 1935. He died in December 1946 in Ottawa.

== Early life ==
Charles Stewart was born on August 26, 1868, in Strabane, Ontario, in Wentworth County, to Charles and Catherine Stewart. Charles Sr. was a stonemason and farmer. As a child, Charles Jr. accompanied his father to Carlisle to hear Canadian Prime Minister Sir John A. Macdonald. According to family lore, Macdonald noticed the young future Premier and told him that he was a fine boy who would make a good politician someday. When Charles Jr. was 16, he moved with his family to a farm near Barrie. Seven years later, on December 17, 1891, he married Jane Russell Sneath; the pair had eight children. After marrying Sneath, he converted to her Church of England faith.

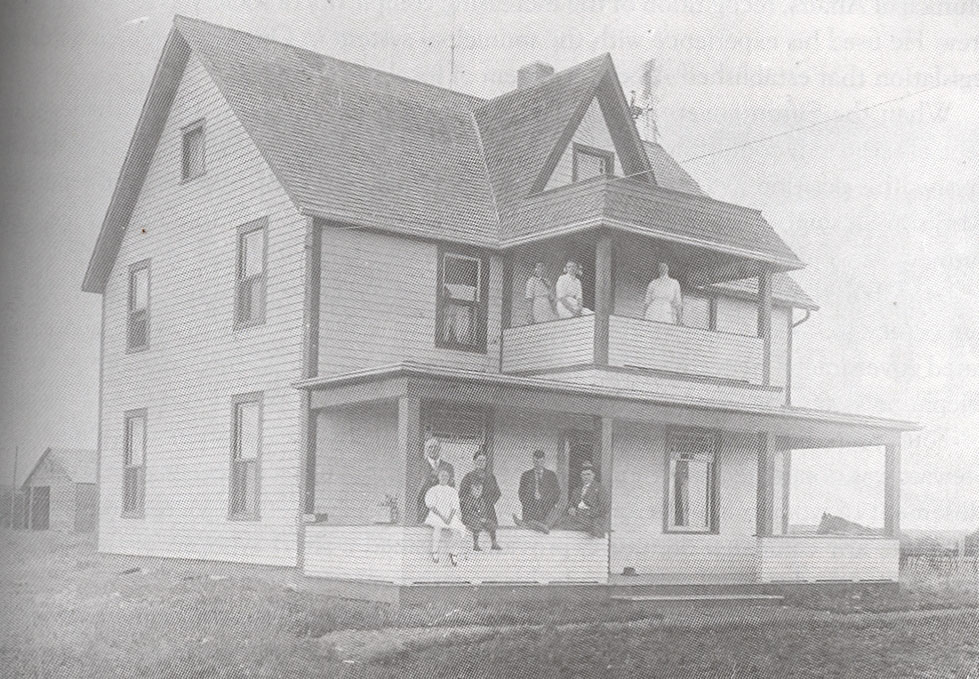
Stewart's farmhouse in Killam; Stewart himself is standing at lower left.

In 1892, Charles Sr. died, leaving his son in charge of the family farm. In 1905, on July 8, this farm was destroyed by a tornado, and Stewart decided to move west, settling near Killam, Alberta in 1906. His family endured a cold winter—the warmest place in their shack was on the kitchen table, so they kept the baby there—and in the spring their crops were destroyed by hail. As he was unsuccessful at farming, he supplemented his income using the stonemason's skills he had learned from his father: he laid foundations for the Canadian Pacific Railway, worked on the High Level Bridge in Edmonton, and dug Killam's town well. He later worked in real estate and as a farm implement dealer, earning enough to buy a new and larger homestead in 1912.

Stewart was active in his local community: he was the first chair of the Killam School District, attended the first meeting of Killam ratepayers on January 19, 1907, and was involved in the incorporation of Killam in January 1908. In 1909, the Alberta Liberal Party, which had dominated provincial politics throughout Alberta's short history, came seeking a candidate to run in the new riding of Sedgewick. Stewart agreed to run and was elected by acclamation in the 1909 election.

=== Early political career ===
At the time of Stewart's acclamation, Premier Alexander Cameron Rutherford seemed unassailable: he controlled 36 of the Legislative Assembly of Alberta's 41 seats (Stewart's being one), and his Liberals had just won nearly sixty percent of the vote in their re-election bid. Months later, however, Rutherford and his government were embroiled in the Alberta and Great Waterways Railway scandal, and the Liberal Party was split. Initially, Stewart remained loyal to Rutherford, and went so far as to allege in the legislature that insurgent Liberal John R. Boyle had offered two members of the legislative assembly (MLAs), who were also hotel keepers, immunity from prosecution for liquor violations if they would support a new government in which Boyle was Attorney-General. As additional details of the scandal emerged, however, Stewart himself became an insurgent, and was pleased when Arthur Sifton replaced Rutherford as Premier.

In May 1912, Sifton expanded his cabinet, and Stewart was made the province's first Minister of Municipal Affairs. As was required by the custom of the day when an MLA was appointed to cabinet, he resigned his seat to run in a by-election, in which he easily defeated Conservative William John Blair. In cabinet, he became known as an advocate of public ownership of utilities, which placed him more in sympathy with the Conservative opposition than with Sifton. Despite this position, he backed Sifton's 1913 resolution to the Alberta and Great Waterways problem, which involved partnering with the private sector; this vote marked the first time that the Liberal caucus was united on the railways question since before the scandal broke in 1910.

In December 1913, Sifton moved Stewart from Municipal Affairs into the Public Works portfolio; in this capacity, Stewart played a major role in the incorporation of the Alberta Farmers' Co-operative Elevator Company, which was a farmer-run co-operative with a charter to own and operate grain elevators.

== Premier ==
Shortly after the 1917 provincial election (in which Stewart and the Liberals were both soundly re-elected), Canada found itself embroiled in a conscription crisis. The federal Conservative government, led by Robert Borden, supported implementing conscription. The opposition Liberals, led by Wilfrid Laurier, nominally opposed conscription, but many English-speaking Liberals in fact supported it. The crisis was resolved when Borden formed a Union government composed of Conservatives and pro-conscription Liberals. Sifton, falling into the latter group, was chosen as Alberta's representative in that government, and resigned as Premier in October 1917. Lieutenant-Governor Robert Brett, accepting Sifton's choice of successor, asked Stewart to form a government. His only serious rival for the position of premier was Charles Wilson Cross, who opposed conscription and was therefore not a palatable choice for much of the Liberal establishment.

=== Party division ===
The Alberta and Great Waterways scandal had opened up a rift in the provincial Liberal Party, between those who remained loyal to Cross and Rutherford and those who did not, with the latter group being led by William Henry Cushing and Frank Oliver. Sifton had papered over, if not in fact healed, this rift, and it did not burst open again until the conscription crisis. This time, however, the fault lines were different: Cross and Oliver had put aside their longtime enmity to join in opposing conscription, and Sifton, who had been selected Premier in part because he was not identified with either faction in the old feud, was Alberta's most prominent pro-conscription Liberal.

Stewart was a supporter of conscription and of the Union government, but did not take any active part in the acrimonious 1917 federal election, which was fought on the issue. Several of his ministers were not so circumspect: Attorney-General Cross, Education Minister Boyle, and Municipal Affairs Minister Wilfrid Gariépy campaigned for the Laurier Liberals; Public Works Minister Archibald J. McLean and Treasurer Charles R. Mitchell stayed out of the fray while leaving no doubt of their support for Union. During the first legislative session after this election, Stewart came under attack from members of his own party. Alexander Grant MacKay criticized his failure to take advantage of the recent conference of premiers to press for the transfer of rights over Alberta's natural resources from the federal to the provincial government (Sifton had made this a priority during the pre-war years, but had largely ceased his advocacy on the breakout of hostilities), and James Gray Turgeon attacked the government's policy of levying taxes for the support of soldiers' dependants on the grounds that he considered it a federal responsibility.

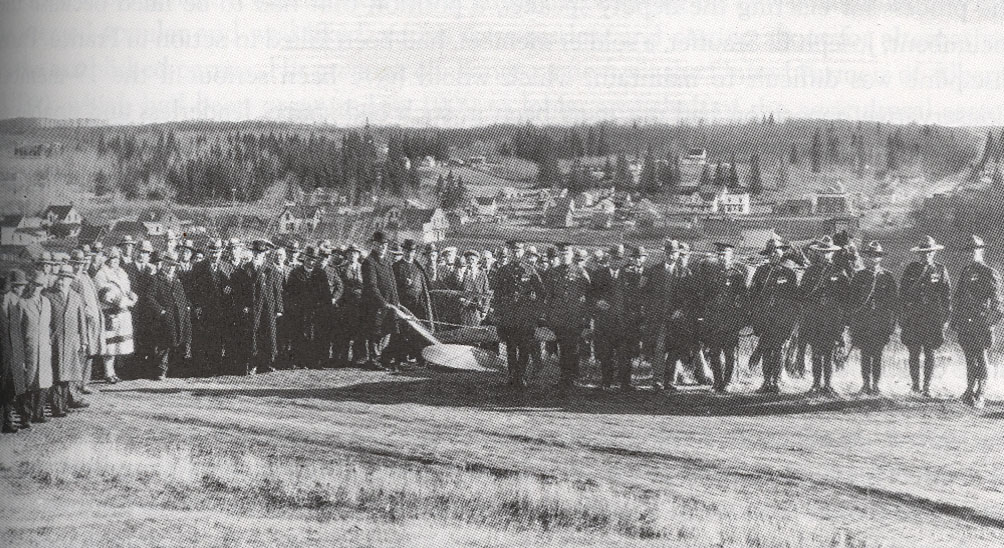
Stewart (behind the plow) at a sod-turning event in St. Albert, soon after becoming premier

Divisions within the provincial Liberals came to a head in August 1918, when Stewart dismissed Cross as Attorney-General. It later emerged that Cross had refused to fire two detectives in his department after Stewart had concluded that their work would be better done by the provincial police, and that Stewart had found Cross's work to be generally poor. He had asked for Cross's resignation, received no response, and rescinded the Order in Council appointing him. In an effort to secure Cross's departure from politics, Stewart offered him the position of Alberta's provincial agent in London, England; Cross refused it, and Stewart was criticized for using appointments for political advantage.

=== Prohibition and democratic reform ===
Alberta had implemented prohibition in 1916 as the result of a referendum supported by the powerful United Farmers of Alberta (UFA) lobby group. By the time Stewart took office, it was becoming apparent that the policy was not being universally complied with: Conservative MLA George Douglas Stanley alleged that judges were often hungover when they sat in judgment of those accused of violating liquor laws, and Cross's replacement as Attorney-General, John Boyle, admitted that in his estimation 65% of the province's male population broke the Prohibition Act. In 1921 the government realized profits of $800,000 on alcohol legally sold for "medicinal" purposes, and Boyle estimated bootleggers' profits at nine times that figure. Stewart blamed the problems on insufficient public support for the law, but even as he did so it was clear that there was not enough support to repeal it.

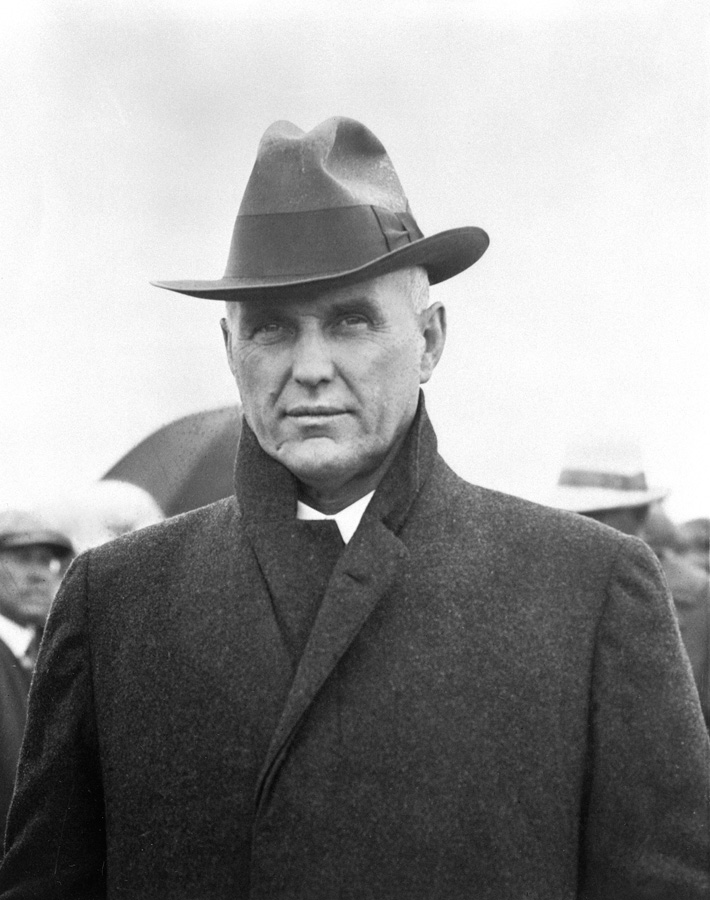
Charles Stewart as Premier

Prohibition was not the only UFA-endorsed policy to have been passed by Sifton's government: indeed, the legislation that allowed for citizen-initiated referendums of the sort that had led to prohibition was itself the result of UFA advocacy. Once Stewart became Premier, he committed to the introduction of another UFA-favoured democratic reform—proportional representation. However, a committee formed to examine the possibility disintegrated over what historian Carrol Jaques calls "battles within the group and a general dislike of the concept".

=== Public works ===
Railway development had dominated the premierships of Stewart's predecessors and, while losing political potency as an issue, it was still a matter that demanded his attention. Though Sifton had established a railway policy in 1913 that was satisfactory to all wings of the Liberal Party, the outbreak of the First World War the following year had all but put an end to railway construction across Canada. Once peace came, Albertans living near promised but as yet unbuilt lines began to clamour for their completion. The private companies with whom the government had partnered, however, were in no position to undertake the construction. The Edmonton, Dunvegan and British Columbia Railway was taken over by the Canadian Pacific Railway, with a clause in the agreement requiring the provincial government to spend $1 million to improve the route, and the Alberta and Great Waterways was taken over by Stewart's government directly (J. D. McArthur, the line's previous owner, retained an option to repurchase it, but it was never exercised).

Irrigation projects also occupied much of Stewart's attention as Premier. As with railways, the First World War had disrupted planned irrigation projects, and Albertan farmers, especially those from the arid south, were eager to see them resumed. Specifically popular was a project to irrigate 500,000 acres (200,000 ha) in Lethbridge County, but when bonds were issued to finance the project, they did not sell. Stewart sought federal backing of the bonds, but Prime Minister Arthur Meighen declined. Stewart reluctantly agreed to offer a provincial guarantee, but to avoid negative reaction from northern Alberta he linked the enabling legislation to one allowing for drainage in northern areas.

=== Stewart and the United Farmers of Alberta ===
The United Farmers of Alberta had its beginnings as a farmers' advocacy organization; Stewart, a farmer, had joined it. The UFA had achieved several successes in dealing with the Sifton government, and Stewart also endeavoured to cooperate with it. The irrigation project was strongly supported by the UFA, as was Stewart's action on proportional representation. When Peace River MLA William Archibald Rae introduced legislation to allow Imperial Oil to build a pipeline in the province, UFA President Henry Wise Wood sent Stewart a telegram of protest, as he believed that pipelines should be common carriers; Stewart read it in the legislature, and Rae's bill was withdrawn. Even given the victories, the UFA was not satisfied with the government's record: in 1918, the government took action on only three of the many resolutions the UFA had sent to it.

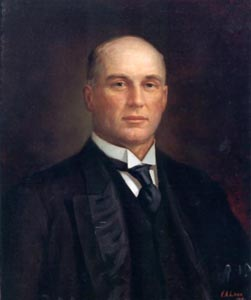
Stewart's official portrait by V. A. Long.

Some in the UFA had long favoured contesting elections directly as a political party instead of remaining on the sidelines as a pressure group, but Wood and other UFA leaders were implacably opposed to the idea. During the war, however, the political wing began to gain momentum, and at the 1919 UFA convention, it was decided that UFA candidates would contest the next provincial election. In fact, it ended up doing so somewhat sooner: in 1919, Charles W. Fisher, Liberal MLA for Cochrane, died as a result of that year's influenza epidemic, and a by-election was necessitated to replace him. The UFA's Alex Moore defeated his only opponent, Liberal Edward V. Thomson, by 835 votes to 708.

Stewart felt betrayed: "It has been my fight ever since I became a minister to see that the farmers of the province were having a square deal," he remarked, "and I think I have done this with some success." Despite his general sympathy with the aims of the UFA, he could not support their transition into a political party. For one, he disagreed with the UFA's belief that politics should be conducted along class, rather than ideological, lines. Stewart believed that "the more strongly armed the classes become the harder will it be to get the things we really need in our government" and asserted that "I never did and never will have any desire to form a coalition with anybody except with men who think the same as I do."

Given the UFA's formal adoption of the goal of replacing Stewart's Liberal government with a Farmer government, it remained surprisingly friendly towards the Premier. While campaigning for Moore during the Cochrane by-election, Wood called Stewart "an honourable, upright citizen, doing the best he could under difficult circumstances" and boasted that "if I have got to tear down the character of an honourable man to build up something that I want, I am not going to build it up." When at last the general election came, in 1921, the UFA declined to run a candidate in Stewart's Sedgewick riding as a sign of respect to the Premier. After the UFA swept to victory, there was even speculation that Stewart, still a UFA member, would stay on as Premier of a new Farmer's government (as part of its opposition to "old style politics," the UFA had contested the election without designating a leader), but he announced otherwise.

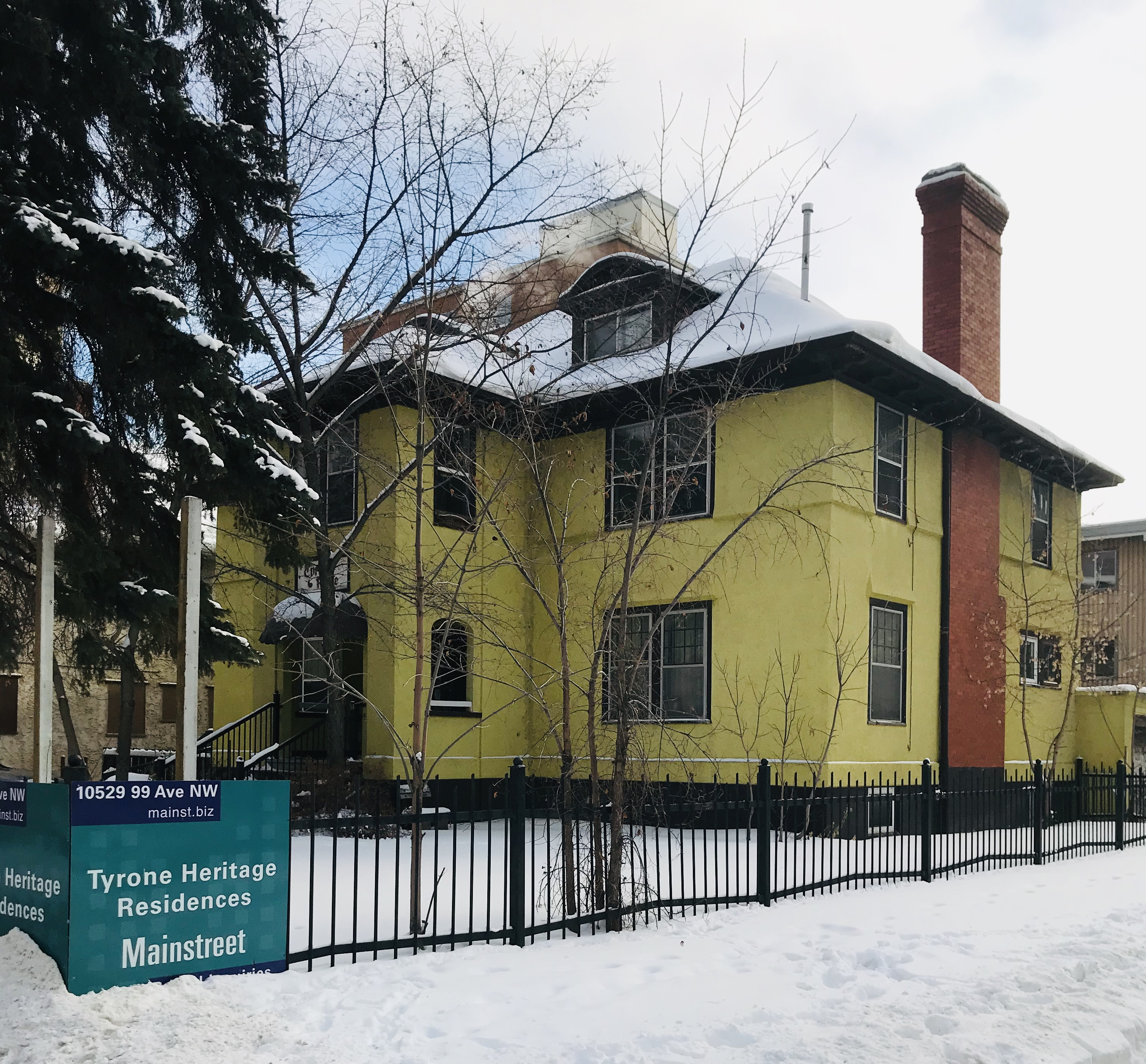
Following his exit from premiership, Stewart resided at Tyrone Manor in downtown Edmonton in the 1920s.

=== Defeat and legacy ===
The last provincial election had been held in June 1917, and four years was the normal life of a legislature in Canada. Stewart called an election for July 19. Though the Liberals' fortunes had been sagging in the post-war years, there remained no doubt that they could again defeat the Conservatives; their real challenge was evidently from the newly politicized UFA. Bolstering this challenge by increasing farmers' discontent was a collapse of agricultural prices. The UFA had no leader, no fixed platform, and no inclination to attack Stewart or his government. What it did have was superior organization, and on election day this organization made itself felt in the form of thirty-nine UFA members elected to fourteen Liberals. Stewart, who has been acclaimed in his own riding of Sedgewick, announced that he would resign as Premier as soon as the UFA had selected somebody to replace him. Once it selected Herbert Greenfield, Stewart made good on his pledge, and Greenfield replaced him August 13.

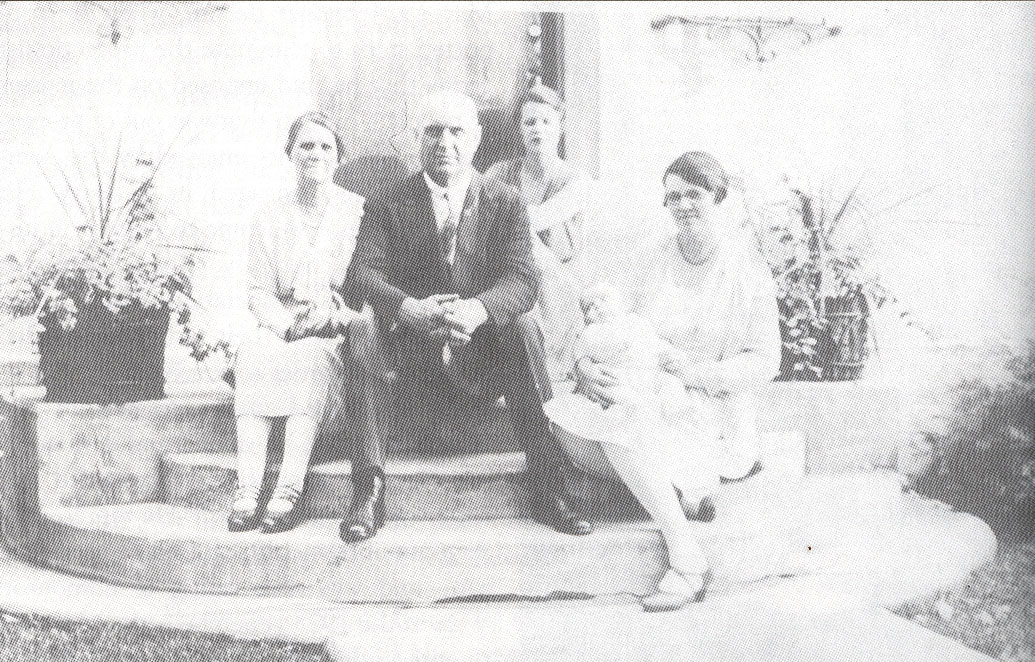
Stewart with his family, c. 1930

In Jaques' view, Stewart was defined by what he was not:

he was not involved in any of the railway scandals, current or past; he was not conspicuously involved in any of the personal battles that had consumed Alexander Rutherford, Frank Oliver, the brothers Arthur and Clifford Sifton, Charles Cross, or any of their followers; he was not a high-powered flamboyant Liberal partisan; he did not let himself get involved in federal Liberal Party machinations over issues such as the conscription crisis; nor did he seem to be high-handed or dictatorial—a criticism levelled at his predecessor, Arthur Sifton.

She argues that he was a "decent family man" whose career was a product of the circumstances in which he found himself.

Historian L. G. Thomas recognized Stewart's admirable qualities, but criticized him for lacking Sifton's "ruthless and forceful leadership" and claimed that "few provincial premiers have been more universally praised by their opponents and more unanimously deplored by their supporters." Even so, he acknowledged that the decisive factor in Stewart's downfall was not anything that he did, but the decision by the UFA to run candidates in 1921; in Thomas's view, Sifton would have been defeated in 1917 if he had had to contend with a politicized UFA.

Mount Charles Stewart is located in the Bow Valley just north of Canmore. The peak was named for him in 1928.

== Federal politics ==
Following the 1921 federal election, William Lyon Mackenzie King's Liberals came to power in Ottawa. They had not won any seats in Alberta, and Stewart was invited to join King's cabinet as Minister of the Interior (which included responsibility as Superintendent-General of Indian Affairs) and Minister of Mines. He also served as Acting Minister of Immigration and Colonization on a number of occasions. He won a 1922 by-election in the Quebec seat of Argenteuil, before shifting to the more familiar territory of Edmonton West in the 1925 election; he was re-elected there in 1926 and 1930. In the 1935 election, he ran in the new riding of Jasper—Edson, where he was defeated by Social Crediter Walter Frederick Kuhl.

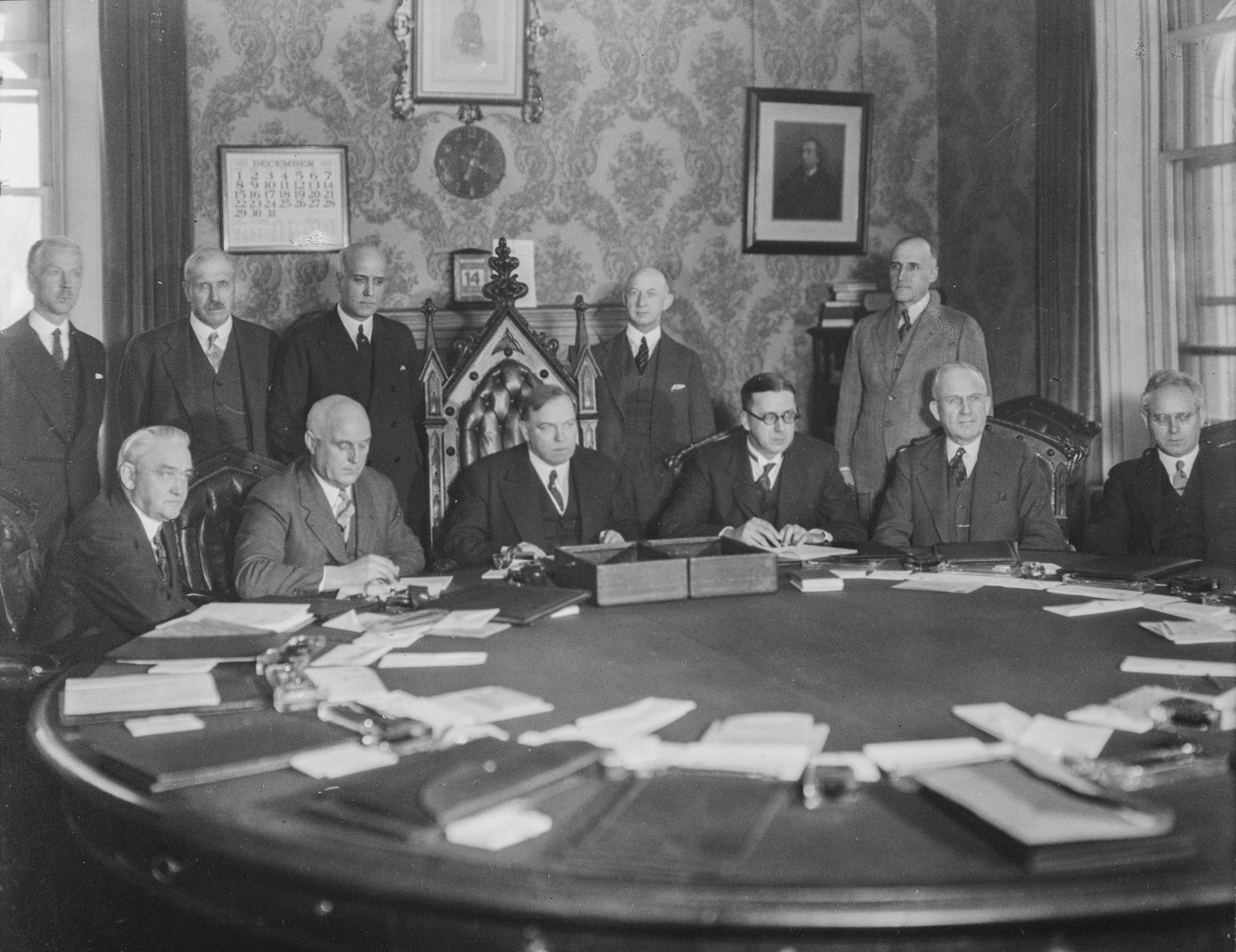
The signing ceremony for the resource transfer agreement; Stewart is seated second from left.

=== Natural Resources ===
As a cabinet minister, Stewart aggressively marketed Canada's coal both domestically and internationally, for which he was honoured by Alberta's coal producers at a banquet and later awarded the Randolph Bruce Gold Medal in Science by the Canadian Institute of Mining and Metallurgy. He took a great interest in water power, and advised the government on jurisdictional issues surrounding the Niagara, St. Mary, and Milk Rivers. In 1927, he served as Canada's representative at the League of Nations. As Minister of the Interior, he oversaw the 1927 creation of Prince Albert National Park. Ironically, given the attacks he had sustained as Premier from Alexander Grant MacKay, he was part of the federal delegation that finally negotiated the transfer of resource control from the federal to the Alberta provincial government in December 1929. The same agreement transferred resource rights to Saskatchewan and Manitoba. After it was signed but before it took effect, Manitoba Premier John Bracken concluded an agreement with the Winnipeg Electric Company, a private concern, to develop a hydroelectric dam at Seven Sisters' Reach. Because resource rights were still controlled by the federal government, the deal required federal approval. Stewart advocated withholding this approval in deference to Manitoba public opinion, which favoured public ownership of such projects, but King honoured a provision of the resource transfer agreement that required the wishes of provincial governments to be respected until the transfer was complete and granted approval. Stewart's preference for public over private ownership extended to King's planned creation of the Bank of Canada; Stewart wanted the new institution entirely under the control of the government, but King preferred an arrangement whereby half of its directors would be appointed by the government and half by private shareholders and suggested that advocates of public ownership might find themselves more at home in the socialist Cooperative Commonwealth Federation than in his Liberal caucus.

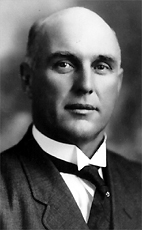
Charles Stewart as a federal cabinet minister

Despite Stewart's involvement in transferring resource rights to Alberta, his relationship with the UFA government that had defeated him in 1921 was frosty: Lakeland College historian Franklin Foster, in his biography of UFA Premier John Edward Brownlee, alleges that this antipathy influenced Stewart's preference for private corporations over the Alberta government in granting hydroelectric power permits. He also feuded with then-Premier Brownlee over development in Alberta's national parks (Stewart favouring large-scale private development and Brownlee opposing it), causing King to record in his diary "Brownlee strikes me as...being superior to Mr. Stewart, who is handicapped in his dislike of [Brownlee]." When King sought to absorb Progressives into his Liberal Party to form a stronger coalition against the Conservatives, Stewart opposed cooperation with the UFA leaders who made up a large part of the Progressives' Albertan base. While King was inclined to view UFA politicians, like Progressives elsewhere, as "Liberals in a hurry" who were fundamentally comfortable with his government and preferred it to the Conservatives, Stewart understood that the UFA was a distinct group whose members were in many respect more conservative than liberal. King dismissed his minister's views as being the result of Stewart's acrimonious history with the UFA.

In fact, Stewart did not enjoy King's confidence. Though he brought him into his cabinet in 1921 in part at the urging of Progressive leader Thomas Crerar, King found Stewart to be an inadequate protector of western interests—especially in his advocacy of tariff reduction, which King found lacklustre—and did not trust his political advice on the west. By 1925 he was considering appointing Stewart to the Senate, to remove him from active political involvement, but was handicapped by the absence of any other Alberta representation in his cabinet. In 1926 Stewart served as an emissary from King to recruit Saskatchewan Premier Charles Avery Dunning to the federal cabinet; the mission fulfilled, King kept Stewart in cabinet but wrote in his diary that all matters pertaining to Alberta were to be "left to Dunning to do as he thinks best". By 1927, King complained that Stewart had "no grip" on the province of which he had once been Premier, and in 1930 he wrote "Organization in Alberta is terrible. Stewart is worse than useless, is like an old woman, with no real control of situation." In the 1930 federal election Dunning and Crerar were both defeated; King complained that it was "perfectly terrible to have Stewart alone representing the West." When Stewart too went down to defeat in 1935, King was pleased "not to have to consider him" in assembling his new cabinet, and opted instead to leave Alberta unrepresented to punish it for failing to elect any Liberals.

=== Chinese Immigration Act ===
While Stewart was Acting Minister of Immigration and Colonization, he introduced Bill 45 on March 2, 1923: An Act respecting Chinese Immigration. Bill 45, which became known as the Chinese Immigration Act (also called the Chinese Exclusion Act) came into effect July 1, 1923. The Act ended the Chinese Head Tax and instead banned almost all Chinese immigration until it was repealed in 1947.

=== Residential Schools ===
During Stewart's tenure as Superintendent-General of Indian Affairs, Dr. Peter Bryce, former Chief Medical Officer for the Department of Indian Affairs, released a report entitled The Story of a National Crime (1922), which detailed how federal policies resulted in health outcomes he found horrifying for First Nations children in the residential school system in Canada. Dr. Bryce worked for the Indian Affairs department until his report resulted in his forced retirement in 1921. One of his major conclusions was that federal policy deliberately encouraged the spread of tuberculosis with the intent to weaken Indigenous communities. When concerns were raised to Stewart in Parliament regarding Dr. Bryce's report by fellow Member of Parliament Milton Neil Campbell, Stewart replied that he had "not read the report mentioned by my hon. friend so that [he] cannot express any opinion upon it."

== Post-political life ==
After Stewart's defeat in 1935, he was appointed by George V to chair the Canadian section of the International Joint Commission, in recognition of his expertise on international water boundary issues. In 1938, he was appointed chair of the Canadian section of the British Columbia – Yukon – Alaska Highway Commission. In these capacities, he travelled across Canada, visiting his son George at the family homestead near Killam at every opportunity. He died December 6, 1946, leaving an estate of $21,961.

Born in one of Canada's original provinces, Stewart moved west as part of a vast migration to the prairies, and settled in Alberta the year it became a province. As Alberta grew, Stewart played an increasingly important political role in it, until he joined the federal government to become Alberta's voice there, ultimately helping it achieve constitutional equality with the older provinces by transferring to its government control of its resources. As Mackenzie King eulogized him, "in more respects than one, Mr. Stewart's career mirrored the development of Canada itself."

== Electoral record ==
=== As party leader ===
Party	Party Leader	# of candidates	Seats			Popular Vote		
Party	Party Leader	# of candidates	1917	Elected	% Change	#	%	% Change
United Farmers	Henry Wise Wood	45	*	38	*	86,250	28.92%	*
Liberal	Charles Stewart	61	34	15	-55.9%	101,584	34.07%	-8.99%
Dominion Labor	Holmes Jowett	10	1	4	+300%	33,987	11.40%	+8.56%
Independent		18	2	3	+50.0%	28,794	9.66%	+4.44%
Conservative	Albert Ewing	13	19	1	-94.7%	32,734	10.98%	-26.4%
Independent Labour		7	*	-	*	10,733	3.60%	*
Socialist		2	-	-	0.0%	2,628	0.88%	+0.26%
Independent Liberal		1	*	-	*	1,467	0.49%	*
Sub-total		157	56	61	+8.9%	298,177	100%	
Soldiers' vote (Province at large)		0	2	-	-	-	-	-20.33%
Total		157	58	61	+5.2%	298,177	100%	
Sources: Elections Alberta; "Alberta provincial election results". Elections Alberta. Archived from the original on 2008-02-11.

=== As MLA ===
1921 Alberta general election: Sedgewick
Party	Candidate	Votes
Liberal	Charles Stewart	Acclaimed

1917 Alberta general election: Sedgewick
Party	Candidate	Votes	%
Liberal	Charles Stewart	1,657	63.1%
Progressive Conservative	John R. Lavell	971	36.9%

1913 Alberta general election: Sedgewick
Party	Candidate	Votes	%
Liberal	Charles Stewart	889	70.1%
Progressive Conservative	W. Watson	371	29.9%

Alberta provincial by-election, 1912: Sedgewick
Party	Candidate	Votes	%
Liberal	Charles Stewart	2,022	67.7%
Progressive Conservative	William John Blair	963	32.3%

1909 Alberta general election: Sedgewick
Party	Candidate	Votes
Liberal	Charles Stewart	Acclaimed

=== As MP ===
1935 Canadian federal election: Jasper—Edson
Party	Candidate	Votes	%
Social Credit	Walter Frederick Kuhl	7,208	49.1%
Liberal	Charles Stewart	5,405	36.8%
Co-operative Commonwealth	George Elzy Bevington	2,067	14.1%
"History of federal ridings since 1867 (Jasper–Edson)". Elections Canada. Archived from the original on 2009-06-09.

1930 Canadian federal election: Edmonton West
Party	Candidate	Votes	%
Liberal	Charles Stewart	9,223	50.7%
Conservative	Frederick C. Jamieson	8,960	49.3%

Canadian federal by-election, October 5, 1926: Edmonton West
Party	Candidate	Votes
Liberal	Charles Stewart	Acclaimed

1926 Canadian federal election: Edmonton West
Party	Candidate	Votes	%
Liberal	Charles Stewart	7,223	55.6%
Conservative	Frederick C. Jamieson	5,772	44.4%

1925 Canadian federal election: Edmonton West
Party	Candidate	Votes	%
Liberal	Charles Stewart	6,394	48.8%
Conservative	James McCrie Douglas	4,706	35.9%
Labour	James East	2,007	15.3%

Canadian federal by-election, 1922: Argenteuil
Party	Candidate	Votes
Liberal	Charles Stewart	Acclaimed
