= Marion Kelts =

Canadian politician (1890–1971)

Marion Arthur Kelts

Member of the Legislative Assembly of Alberta
- In office June 18, 1959 – June 17, 1963
- Preceded by: James Sims
- Succeeded by: District abolished
- Constituency: Acadia-Coronation

Personal details
- Born: April 30, 1890 Dora, Minnesota
- Died: April 1, 1971 (aged 80) Stettler, Alberta
- Party: Social Credit
- Occupation: politician

Marion Arthur Kelts (April 30, 1890 – April 1, 1971) was a provincial politician from Alberta, Canada. He served as a member of the Legislative Assembly of Alberta from 1959 to 1963 sitting with the Social Credit caucus in government.

== Political career ==
Kelts ran for a seat to the Alberta Legislature as a Social Credit candidate in the 1959 Alberta general election in the Acadia-Coronation electoral district. He won the hotly contested three-way race defeating incumbent James Sims.

Kelts did not run for a second term in office and retired at dissolution of the assembly in 1963.
