= Jack Charles Hillman =

Canadian politician (1893-1977)

John "Jack" Charles Hillman

Member of the Legislative Assembly of Alberta
- In office August 5, 1952 – June 17, 1963
- Preceded by: Albert Fee
- Constituency: Sedgewick
- In office June 17, 1963 – August 30, 1971
- Succeeded by: Ralph Sorenson
- Constituency: Sedgewick-Coronation

Personal details
- Born: October 6, 1893 Llydney, Gloucestershire, England
- Died: December 13, 1977 (aged 84) Galahad, Alberta, Canada
- Party: Social Credit
- Occupation: politician

John Charles Hillman (October 6, 1893 – December 13, 1977) was a provincial politician from Alberta, Canada. He served as a member of the Legislative Assembly of Alberta from 1952 to 1971 sitting with the Social Credit caucus in government.

== Political career ==
Hillman ran for a seat to the Alberta Legislature in the 1952 Alberta general election. He stood as the Social Credit candidate in the electoral district of Sedgewick. Hillman won the district with a landslide majority to hold the seat for his party.

Hillman ran for a second term in the 1955 Alberta general election. He held his vote share from the last election and took the district easily, defeating two other candidates.

The 1959 general election would see Hillman be returned to office with his largest majority to date. He easily defeated three other candidates.

The 1963 boundary redistribution saw Sedgewick redistributed to become Sedgewick-Coronation. Hillman ran in the new district in the election held that year against former MLA James Sims. He defeated Sims in a landslide to earn his fourth term in office.

Hillman ran for his fifth term in the 1967 general election. He was returned to office with a sizable majority easily defeating three other candidates.

Hillman retired from the Assembly at dissolution in 1971.
