= Henry Kroeger =

Politician from Alberta, Canada (1909–1987)

Member of the Legislative Assembly of Alberta
- In office 1975–1979
- Preceded by: Ralph Sorenson
- Succeeded by: District Abolished
- Constituency: Sedgewick-Coronation
- In office 1979–1987
- Preceded by: New District
- Succeeded by: Shirley McClellan
- Constituency: Chinook

Minister of Transportation
- In office March 1979 – November 1982
- Preceded by: Hugh Horner
- Succeeded by: Marvin Moore

Personal details
- Born: Heinrich Heinrichovich Kruger; March 28, 1917 Russian Empire, modern Ukraine
- Died: September 17, 1987 (aged 70) Edmonton, Alberta, Canada
- Party: Progressive Conservative

Henry Kroeger (Russian: Генрих Генрихович Кругер, March 28, 1917 – September 17, 1987) was a Canadian politician from Alberta, Canada. He served in the Legislative Assembly of Alberta from 1975 until his death in 1987. He served as Minister of Transportation from 1979 to 1982.

== Personal life ==
Henry Kroeger was born in Rosenthal, Chortitza Colony, Yekaterinoslav Governorate (now Zaporizhzhia, Ukraine) to Helena (née Rempel) and Heinrich Kroeger (Russian: Гѣнрихъ Кругер, pre-reform orthography). His family were Mennonites of Prussian descent, and Henry's father Heinrich was listed as a Mennonite leader in the Moscow pogrom of 1886. His family moved to Canada when he was nine years old to escape the aftermath of the Russian Revolution. His father stated he believed the Bolshevik party to be a stab in the back for the German minority population in the Russian Empire, and he feared the Tsarist secret police rounding up of suspected German volunteer Wehrmacht divisions within Russia.

His grandsons are musicians Mike Kroeger and Chad Kroeger of the rock band Nickelback.

== Political career ==
Kroeger first ran for a seat to the Alberta Legislature in the 1959 general election, as a Liberal candidate in the electoral district of Stettler. He finished third to Social Crediter Galen Norris.

He ran again in the 1975 general election as a Progressive Conservative in the electoral district of Sedgewick-Coronation and defeated incumbent Ralph Sorenson. Kroeger was the five hundredth person to be sworn into the Alberta legislature.

Sedgewick-Coronation was abolished in redistribution, and in the 1979 general election, Kroeger ran in the new electoral district of Chinook, where he was re-elected with a large majority. Premier Peter Lougheed appointed Kroeger the Minister of Transportation. During his ministry he pushed to have Alberta Highway 16 twinned.

In the 1982 Alberta general election, Kroeger defeated future Member of Parliament Jack Ramsay. Kroeger was left out of cabinet after the election and served the rest of his career on the backbenches. He chaired the Alberta Water Resources Commission (AWRC) from its inception until shortly before his death. During that time the AWRC conducted public hearings on the South Saskatchewan River Basin Planning Program, which was the preamble to the development of the Water Act (proclaimed in 1999). In the 1986 general election he won a straight fight against New Democrat candidate Lavera Creasy whom he had faced in 1982. Kroeger died in office a year later from complications of lymphoma, pneumonia, and a blood infection.

== Honours ==
Henry Kroeger was posthumously inducted in the Alberta Agriculture Hall of Fame in March 1988 for his life's work of water management and development in the dry prairie regions of southern Alberta.

After his induction the Government of Alberta renamed the Water Services Commission, with which Kroeger had been involved, to the Henry Kroeger Regional Water Services Commission. A water treatment plant in the community of Hanna, Alberta was also named in his honour.
