= James Leland Sims =

Canadian politician (1905-1977)

Member of the Legislative Assembly of Alberta
- In office June 29, 1955 – June 18, 1959
- Preceded by: Clarence Gerhart
- Succeeded by: Marion Kelts
- Constituency: Acadia-Coronation

Personal details
- Born: March 28, 1905 Mowbray, Manitoba
- Died: July 2, 1977 (aged 72) Consort Hospital, Consort, Alberta
- Party: Liberal
- Spouse: Margaret Grace Myfanwy Sims (Griffith) December 3, 1913 – September 6, 2009
- Children: Jeryl Auten (Sims); Mervin Roger Sims November 17, 1944 – April 4, 2024
- Occupation: politician

James Leland Sims (March 28, 1905 – July 2, 1977) was a provincial politician from Alberta, Canada. He served as a member of the Legislative Assembly of Alberta from 1955 to 1959 sitting with the Liberal caucus in opposition.

== Political career ==
Sims ran for a seat to the Alberta Legislature in the 1955 Alberta general election as a Liberal party candidate in the electoral district of Acadia-Coronation. The race was hotly contested with Sims defeating Social Credit incumbent Clarence Gerhart on the second ballot. Sims finished a close second on the first count but was able to surpass Gerhart on second choice votes from Cooperative Commonwealth candidate L. E. Reiman.

Sims ran for a second term in the 1959 Alberta general election. He was defeated finishing a distant second place in the field of three candidates losing to Social Credit candidate Marion Kelts.

Sims attempted to regain his seat in 1963 Alberta general election. He ran in the new electoral district of Sedgewick-Coronation. Sims was defeated again finishing in second place losing to incumbent Jack Hillman in a landslide.
