= Hand Hills (Alberta) =

Range of hills in Alberta, Canada

Coordinates: 51.50013°N 112.28513°W

Hand Hills is a range of hills in Alberta, Canada.

Hand Hills recalls an Indian chief who possessed an unusually small hand.
