= 4th Alberta Legislature =

Canadian Legislative Assembly

- Majority parliament
- Feb. 7, 1918 – Jun. 23, 1921

Parliament leaders
- Premier: Charles Stewart; October 30, 1917 – August 13, 1921
- Cabinet: Stewart cabinet
- Leader of the Opposition: George Hoadley; February 7, 1918 – April 17, 1919
- James Ramsey; February 17, 1920 – April 10, 1920
- Albert Ewing; February 15, 1921 – April 19, 1921

Party caucuses
- Government: Liberal Party
- Opposition: Conservative Party

Legislative Assembly
- Speaker of the Assembly: Charles W. Fisher; March 15, 1906 – May 15, 1919
- Charles Pingle; February 17, 1920 – July 18, 1921
- Members: 58 MLA seats

Sovereign
- Monarch: George V May 6, 1910 – January 20, 1936
- Lieutenant governor: Hon. Robert George Brett; October 20, 1915 – October 29, 1925

Sessions
- 1st session February 7, 1918 – April 13, 1918
- 2nd session February 4, 1919 – April 17, 1919
- 3rd session February 17, 1920 – April 10, 1920
- 4th session February 15, 1921 – April 19, 1921
← 3rd	→ 5th

The 4th Alberta Legislative Assembly was in session from February 7, 1918, to June 23, 1921, with the membership of the assembly determined by the results of the 1917 Alberta general election held on June 7, 1917. The Legislature officially resumed on February 7, 1918, and continued until the fourth session was prorogued on April 19, 1921 and dissolved on June 23, 1921, prior to the 1921 Alberta general election.

Alberta's second government was controlled by the majority Liberal Party led by Premier Arthur Sifton, who would resign shortly after the 1917 election on October 30, 1917 to contest the 1917 Canadian general election for the Unionist Party under Prime Minister Robert Borden in support of the Borden government during the Conscription Crisis of 1917. Charles Stewart would be Sifton's choice as replacement as Premier, which was accepted by Lieutenant Governor Robert Brett. The Official Opposition was the Conservative Party led by George Hoadley for the first session, and James Ramsey for the remaining sessions. The Speaker was Charles W. Fisher who continued in the role from the 1st, 2nd and 3rd assembly, and would serve in the role until his death from the 1918 flu pandemic on May 5, 1919. Fisher was replaced as Speaker of the Legislative Assembly by Charles Pingle.

The 4th Assembly would be the final time the Alberta Liberal Party would hold government, being replaced by the United Farmers of Alberta following the 1921 general election.

== Members of the 4th Legislative Assembly ==
District	Member	Party	First elected / previously elected	No.# of term(s)
Acadia	John McColl	Liberal	1913	2nd term
Alexandra	James Lowery	Conservative	1913	2nd term
Athabasca	Alexander Grant MacKay	Liberal	1913	2nd term
Athabasca	George Mills (1919)	Liberal	1919	1st term
Beaver River	Wilfrid Gariépy	Liberal	1913	2nd term
Bow Valley	Charles R. Mitchell	Liberal	1910, (Note: Medicine Hat) 1913	3rd term*
Camrose	George P. Smith	Liberal	1909	3rd term
Cardston	Martin Woolf	Liberal	1912	3rd term
Centre Calgary	Alex Ross	Labor Representation	1917	1st term
Claresholm	Louise McKinney	Non-Partisan (Note: Members of the Alberta Non-Partisan League, became members of the United Farmers of Alberta on July 15, 1919.)	1917	1st term
Clearwater	Joseph State	Liberal	1917	1st term
Cochrane	Charles W. Fisher	Liberal	1905	4th term
Cochrane	Alexander Moore (1919)	United Farmers	1919	1st term
Coronation	William Wilson	Conservative	1917	1st term
Didsbury	Henry B. Atkins	Liberal	1917	1st term
Edmonton East	James Ramsey	Conservative	1917	1st term
Edmonton West	Albert Ewing	Conservative	1913	2nd term
Edmonton South	Herbert Crawford	Conservative	1913	2nd term
Edson	Charles Wilson Cross	Liberal	1905	4th term
Gleichen	Fred Davis	Conservative	1917	1st term
Grouard	Jean Côté	Liberal	1909	3rd term
Hand Hills	Robert Eaton	Liberal	1913	2nd term
High River	George Douglas Stanley	Conservative	1913	2nd term
Innisfail	Daniel Morkeberg	Liberal	1917	1st term
Lac Ste. Anne	George Barker	Conservative	1917	1st term
Lacombe	Andrew Gilmour	Conservative	1917	1st term
Leduc	Stanley Tobin	Liberal	1913	2nd term
Lethbridge City	John Stewart	Conservative	1911	3rd term
Little Bow	James McNaughton	Liberal	1913	2nd term
Macleod	George Skelding	Liberal	1917	1st term
Medicine Hat	Nelson Spencer	Conservative	1913	2nd term
Nanton	James Weir	Non-Partisan	1917	1st term
North Calgary	William McCartney Davidson	Liberal	1917	1st term
Okotoks	George Hoadley	Conservative	1909	3rd term
Olds	Duncan Marshall	Liberal	1909	3rd term
Peace River	William Archibald Rae	Liberal	1917	1st term
Pembina	Gordon MacDonald	Liberal	1913	2nd term
Pincher Creek	John Kemmis	Conservative	1911	3rd term
Ponoka	Charles Cunningham	Conservative	1917	1st term
Red Deer	Edward Michener	Conservative	1909	3rd term
Red Deer	John Gaetz (1918)	Liberal	1918	1st term
Redcliff	Charles Pingle	Liberal	1913	2nd term
Ribstone	James Gray Turgeon	Liberal	1913	2nd term
Rocky Mountain	Robert Campbell	Conservative	1913	2nd term
Sedgewick	Charles Stewart	Liberal	1909	3rd term
South Calgary	Thomas Blow	Conservative	1913	2nd term
St. Albert	Lucien Boudreau	Liberal	1909	3rd term
Stettler	Edward Prudden	Liberal	1917	1st term
St. Paul	Prosper-Edmond Lessard	Liberal	1913	2nd term
Stony Plain	Frederick Lundy	Conservative	1917	1st term
Sturgeon	John Boyle	Liberal	1905	4th term
Taber	Archibald J. McLean	Liberal	1909	3rd term
Vegreville	Joseph McCallum	Liberal	1913	2nd term
Vermilion	Arthur Lewis Sifton	Liberal	1910	3rd term
Vermilion	Arthur Ebbett (1917)	Liberal	1917	1st term
Victoria	Francis A. Walker	Liberal	1905	4th term
Wainwright	George LeRoy Hudson	Conservative	1913	2nd term
Warner	Frank Leffingwell	Liberal	1913	2nd term
Wetaskiwin	Hugh John Montgomery	Liberal	1914	2nd term
Whitford	Andrew Shandro	Liberal	1913	2nd term
Province at Large	Robert Pearson	Canadian Armed Forces	1917	1st term
Province at Large	Roberta MacAdams	Canadian Armed Forces	1917	1st term

== Standings changes in the 4th general election ==
Membership changes in the 4th Assembly
Date	Member Name	District	Party	Reason
November 9, 1917	George Smith	Camrose	Liberal	Resigned to run in a ministerial by-election
November 19, 1917	Arthur Ebbett	Vermilion	Liberal	Elected in a by-election
September 27, 1918	Alexander MacKay	Athabasca	Liberal	Resigned to run in a ministerial by-election
October 21, 1918	Jean Côté	Grouard	Liberal	Resigned to run in a ministerial by-election
October 28, 1918	John Gaetz	Red Deer	Liberal	Elected in a by-election
March 29, 1919	Alex Ross	Centre Calgary	Dominion Labor	Formed the Dominion Labor caucus
May 5, 1919	Charles Fisher	Cochrane	Liberal	Died
November 3, 1919	Alexander Moore	Cochrane	United Farmers	Elected in a by-election
November 3, 1919	George Mills	Athabasca	Liberal	Elected in a by-election
