= 5th Alberta Legislature =

Canadian Legislative Assembly

- Majority parliament
- Feb. 2, 1922 – May. 25, 1926

Parliament leaders
- Premier: Herbert Greenfield; August 13, 1921 – November 23, 1925
- John Edward Brownlee; November 23, 1925 – July 10, 1934
- Cabinets: Greenfield cabinet Brownlee cabinet
- Leader of the Opposition: John Robert Boyle; February 2, 1922 – April 12, 1924
- Charles Richmond Mitchell; February 19, 1925 – March 12, 1926
- John C. Bowen; March 15, 1926 – June 28, 1926

Party caucuses
- Government: United Farmers of Alberta
- Opposition: Liberal Party
- Crossbench: Dominion Labor Party
- Conservative Party

Legislative Assembly
- Speaker of the Assembly: Oran McPherson; February 2, 1922 – May 25, 1926
- Members: 61 MLA seats

Sovereign
- Monarch: George V May 6, 1910 – January 20, 1936
- Lieutenant governor: Hon. Robert George Brett; October 20, 1915 – October 29, 1925
- Hon. William Egbert; October 29, 1925 – May 5, 1931

Sessions
- 1st session February 2, 1922 – March 28, 1922
- 2nd session July 25, 1922 – July 31, 1922
- 3rd session January 23, 1923 – April 21, 1923
- 4th session January 28, 1924 – April 12, 1924
- 5th session February 19, 1925 – August 6, 1925
- 6th session February 11, 1926 – May 22, 1926
← 4th	→ 6th

The 5th Alberta Legislative Assembly was in session from February 2, 1922, to May 25, 1926, with the membership of the assembly determined by the results of the 1921 Alberta general election held on July 18, 1921. The Legislature officially resumed on February 2, 1922, and continued until the sixth session was prorogued on May 22, 1926 and dissolved on May 25, 1926, prior to the 1926 Alberta general election.

Alberta's fifth government was controlled by the majority United Farmers of Alberta led by Premier Herbert Greenfield, who would resign following a push from the party on November 23, 1925, and was replaced by John Edward Brownlee. The Official Opposition was the Alberta Liberal Party led by John Robert Boyle, and later Charles Richmond Mitchell, and eventually future Lieutenant Governor of Alberta John C. Bowen. The Speaker was Oran McPherson.

== Speaker ==
Premier Herbert Greenfield nominated the government's preferred candidate for speaker, Oran McPherson, only to have one of his UFA backbenchers, Alex Moore, nominate Independent Conservative John Smith Stewart; Stewart spared the government embarrassment by declining the nomination.

== Bills ==
=== Wheat Board ===
The Legislature would pass An Act to Confer Certain Powers upon the Canadian Wheat Board (Bill 1) during the short second session in August 1922. The bill conferred powers to the create the Alberta Wheat Pool.

=== Debt Adjustment Act ===
The Debt Adjustment Act (Bill 49) of 1923 was designed to adjust farmers' debts to a level that they could actually pay, thus allowing them to carry on while still ensuring that creditors received as much as was feasible. In the words of University of Calgary professor David C. Jones, the bill offered "solace, but no real satisfaction". According to Jones, Greenfield's attempts to rescue southern Alberta from agricultural calamity were probably doomed to failure. Even so, Greenfield had called the situation his top priority, and his failure to bring it to a successful resolution cost him politically.

=== Government Liquor Control Act of Alberta ===
The Government Liquor Control Act of Alberta (Bill 14) passed in the fourth session in 1924. The bill repealed prohibition which had been instituted following a 1916 referendum. The Government held a referendum on the matter in autumn 1923 which saw Albertans vote decisively for the repeal of prohibition. Bill 14 would be subject to a free vote in the legislature, and while the legislation passed, the new measures were divisive, pitting community leaders who wanted their towns to remain "dry" against those who wanted to apply for liquor licences, and different would-be saloon-keepers against one another in competing for the government-issued licences.

== Membership in the 5th Alberta Legislature ==
5th Alberta Legislature
District	Member	Party	First elected/ previously elected	No.# of term(s)
Acadia	Lorne Proudfoot	United Farmers	1921	1st term
Alexandra	Peter Enzenauer	United Farmers	1921	1st term
Athabasca	George Mills	Liberal	1919	2nd term
Beaver River	Joseph Dechene	Liberal	1921	1st term
Bow Valley	Charles Mitchell	Liberal	1910, (Note: Medicine Hat) 1913	4th term*
Calgary	Alex Ross	Dominion Labor	1917	2nd term
Calgary	Robert Edwards	Independent	1921	1st term
Calgary	Fred White	Dominion Labor	1921	1st term
Calgary	Robert Marshall	Liberal	1921	1st term
Calgary	Robert Pearson	Independent	1917	2nd term
Calgary	William M. Davidson (1923)	Liberal	1917, (Note: North Calgary) 1923	2nd term*
Camrose	Vernor Smith	United Farmers	1921	1st term
Cardston	George Stringam	United Farmers	1921	1st term
Claresholm	Thomas Milnes	Independent Farmer	1921	1st term
Clearwater	Joseph State	Liberal	1917	2nd term
Cochrane	Alexander Moore	United Farmers	1919	2nd term
Coronation	George Johnston	United Farmers	1921	1st term
Didsbury	Austin Claypool	United Farmers	1921	1st term
Edmonton	Andrew McLennan	Liberal	1921	1st term
Edmonton	John C. Bowen	Liberal	1921	1st term
Edmonton	Nellie McClung	Liberal	1921	1st term
Edmonton	John Boyle	Liberal	1905	5th term
Edmonton	Jeremiah Heffernan	Liberal	1921	1st term
Edmonton	William T. Henry (1924)	Liberal	1924	1st term
Edson	Charles Cross	Liberal	1905	5th term
Gleichen	John Buckley	United Farmers	1921	1st term
Grouard	Jean Côté	Liberal	1909	4th term
Grouard	Leonidas Giroux (1924)	United Farmers	1924	1st term
Hand Hills	Gordon Forster	United Farmers	1921	1st term
High River	Samuel Brown	United Farmers	1921	1st term
Innisfail	Donald Cameron	United Farmers	1921	1st term
Lac Ste. Anne	Charles McKeen	United Farmers	1921	1st term
Lacombe	Irene Parlby	United Farmers	1921	1st term
Leduc	Stanley Tobin	Liberal	1913	3rd term
Lethbridge	John Stewart	Conservative	1911	4th term
Little Bow	Oran McPherson	United Farmers	1921	1st term
Macleod	William Shield	United Farmers	1921	1st term
Medicine Hat	Perren Baker	United Farmers	1921	1st term
Medicine Hat	William Johnston (1921)	Dominion Labor	1921	1st term
Medicine Hat	Charles Pingle (1925)	Liberal	1913, (Note: Redcliff) 1925	3rd term*
Nanton	Daniel Galbraith	United Farmers	1921	1st term
Okotoks	George Hoadley	United Farmers	1909 (Note: First elected as Conservative)	4th term
Olds	Nelson Smith	United Farmers	1921	1st term
Peace River	Donald Kennedy	United Farmers	1921	1st term
Peace River	Herbert Greenfield (1921)	United Farmers	1921	1st term
Pembina	George MacLachlan	United Farmers	1921	1st term
Pincher Creek	Earle Cook	United Farmers	1921	1st term
Ponoka	Percival Baker	United Farmers	1921	1st term
Ponoka	John Brownlee (1921)	United Farmers	1921	1st term
Red Deer	George Smith	United Farmers	1921	1st term
Redcliff	William Smith	United Farmers	1921	1st term
Ribstone	Charles Wright	United Farmers	1921	1st term
Ribstone	William Farquharson (1922)	United Farmers	1922	1st term
Rocky Mountain	Philip Christophers	Dominion Labor	1921	1st term
Sedgewick	Charles Stewart	Liberal	1909	4th term
Sedgewick	Albert Andrews (1922)	United Farmers	1922	1st term
St. Albert	Télesphore St. Arnaud	United Farmers	1921	1st term
Stettler	Albert Sanders	United Farmers	1921	1st term
St. Paul	Laudas Joly	United Farmers	1921	1st term
Stony Plain	Willard Washburn	United Farmers	1921	1st term
Sturgeon	Samuel Carson	United Farmers	1921	1st term
Taber	Lawrence Peterson	United Farmers	1921	1st term
Vegreville	Archie Matheson	United Farmers	1921	1st term
Vermilion	Richard Reid	United Farmers	1921	1st term
Victoria	William Fedun	United Farmers	1921	1st term
Wainwright	John Love	United Farmers	1921	1st term
Warner	Maurice Conner	United Farmers	1921	1st term
Wetaskiwin	Evert Sparks	United Farmers	1921	1st term
Whitford	Andrew Shandro	Liberal	1913	3rd term
Whitford	Mike Chornohus (1922)	United Farmers	1922	1st term

=== Standings changes since the 5th general election ===
Changes to party standings during the 5th Alberta Legislature

July 11, 1921, to November 14, 1922
Number of members per party by date	1921								1922			
Number of members per party by date	Jul 11	Jul 18	Jul 20	Aug 1	Nov 16	Dec 2	Dec 4	Dec 29	Mar 28	Jul 3	Jul 10	Nov 14
United Farmers	0	38	37	36	33	38			37	38	40	
Liberal	2	15					14	13				
Dominion Labor	0	4			3	4						
Independent	0	2										1
Conservative	0	1										
Independent Farmer	0	1										
Total members	2	61	60	59	55	61	60	59	58	59	61	60
Vacant	59	0	1	2	6	0	1	2	3	2	0	1
Government Majority	N/A	15	14	13	11	17^{1}	18^{1}	19^{1}	18^{1}	19^{1}	21^{1}	22^{1}

January 15, 1923, to March 18, 1926
Number of members per party by date	1923			1924				1925				1926
Number of members per party by date	Jan 15	Aug 10	Nov 10	Apr 12	Jul 11	Aug 27	Oct 27	Jun 6	Sep 29	Oct 15	Oct 17	Mar 18
United Farmers	40											
Liberal	13	12	11		12	11	12		13	10		9
Dominion Labor	4							3				
Independent	2										1	
Conservative	1									0		
Independent Farmer	1									0		
Total members	61	60	59		60	59	60	59	60	55	54	53
Vacant	0	1	2	1	0	1	0	1	0	5	6	7
Government Majority	21^{1}	22^{1}	23^{1}		22^{1}	23^{1}	22^{1}	23^{1}	22^{1}	27^{1}	28^{1}	29^{1}

1. Majority includes 1 Dominion Labor MLA appointed to the cabinet.

Membership changes in the 5th Assembly
Date	Member Name	District	Party	Reason
July 11, 1921	Charles Stewart	Sedgewick	Liberal	Acclaimed in the 1921 general election
July 11, 1921	Andrew Shandro	Whitford	Liberal	Acclaimed in the 1921 general election
July 18, 1921	See List of Members			Election day of the fifth Alberta general election
July 20, 1921	Percival Baker	Ponoka	United Farmers	Died before taking office
August 1, 1921	Donald Kennedy	Peace River	United Farmers	Resigned to run in the 1921 federal election.
November 16, 1921	Alex Ross	Calgary	Dominion Labor	Resigned to run in a ministerial by-election
November 16, 1921	Vernor Smith	Camrose	United Farmers	Resigned to run in a ministerial by-election
November 16, 1921	Perren Baker	Medicine Hat	United Farmers	Resigned to run in a ministerial by-election
November 16, 1921	George Hoadley	Okotoks	United Farmers	Resigned to run in a ministerial by-election
December 2, 1921	Alex Ross	Calgary	Dominion Labor	Acclaimed for December 9, 1921, by-election
December 2, 1921	Vernor Smith	Camrose	United Farmers	Acclaimed for December 9, 1921, by-election
December 2, 1921	Perren Baker	Medicine Hat	United Farmers	Acclaimed for December 9, 1921, by-election
December 2, 1921	George Hoadley	Okotoks	United Farmers	Acclaimed for December 9, 1921, by-election
December 2, 1921	Herbert Greenfield	Peace River	United Farmers	Acclaimed for December 9, 1921, by-election
December 2, 1921	John Brownlee	Ponoka	United Farmers	Acclaimed for December 9, 1921, by-election
December 4, 1921	Andrew Shandro	Whitford	Liberal	Removed from office by court order 1921 election voided
December 29, 1921	Charles Stewart	Sedgewick	Liberal	Appointed to the federal cabinet.
March 28, 1922	Charles Wright	Ribstone	United Farmers	Died from pneumonia
July 3, 1922	Albert Andrews	Sedgewick	United Farmers	Acclaimed for July 10, 1922, by-election
July 10, 1922	William Farquharson	Ribstone	United Farmers	Elected in a by-election
July 10, 1922	Mike Chornohus	Whitford	United Farmers	Elected in a by-election
November 14, 1922	Robert Edwards	Calgary	Independent	Died
January 15, 1923	William Davidson	Calgary	Independent	Elected in a by-election
August 10, 1923	Joseph State	Clearwater	Liberal	Died
November 10, 1923	Jean Côté	Grouard	Liberal	Appointed to the Senate of Canada
April 12, 1924	Vacant	Clearwater	Vacant	District abolished by the United Farmers government.
July 11, 1924	Leonidas Giroux	Grouard	Liberal	Elected in a by-election
August 27, 1924	John Boyle	Edmonton	Liberal	Appointed to the bench
October 27, 1924	William Henry	Edmonton	Liberal	Elected in a by-election
June 6, 1925	William Johnston	Medicine Hat	Dominion Labor	Died
September 29, 1925	Charles Pingle	Medicine Hat	Liberal	Elected in a by-election
October 15, 1925^{1}	Charles Cross	Edson	Liberal	Resigned to run in the 1925 federal election
October 15, 1925^{1}	Thomas Milnes	Claresholm	Independent Farmer	Resigned to run in the 1925 federal election
October 15, 1925^{1}	Andrew McLennan	Edmonton	Liberal	Resigned to run in the 1925 federal election
October 15, 1925^{1}	Stanley Tobin	Leduc	Liberal	Resigned to run in the 1925 federal election
October 15, 1925^{1}	John Stewart	Lethbridge	Conservative	Resigned to run in the 1925 federal election
October 17, 1925	William Davidson	Calgary	Independent	Resigned to run in the 1925 federal election
March 18, 1926	Charles Mitchell	Bow Valley	Liberal	Resigned to accept judicial appointment.
May 1926	George Mills	Athabasca	Independent Liberal	Left the Liberal caucus to run as an Independent Liberal

1. Exact date the Speaker received resignation unknown, nomination deadline date for the 1925 federal election used. All were received by Speaker Oran McPherson after September 29 and before October 17.

== Works cited ==
- Foster, Franklin L. (1981). John E. Brownlee: A Biography. Lloydminster, Alberta: Foster Learning Inc. ISBN 978-1-55220-004-9.
- Foster, Franklin L. (2004). "John E. Brownlee". In Bradford J. Rennie (ed.). Alberta Premiers of the Twentieth Century. Regina, Saskatchewan: Canadian Plains Research Center, University of Regina. ISBN 0-88977-151-0.
- Jones, David C. (2004). "Herbert W. Greenfield". In Bradford J. Rennie (ed.). Alberta Premiers of the Twentieth Century. Regina, Saskatchewan: Canadian Plains Research Center, University of Regina. ISBN 0-88977-151-0.
