= Robert Pearson (politician) =

Canadian politician

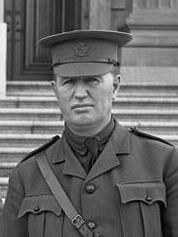

Member of the Legislative Assembly of Alberta
- In office 1921–1926
- Preceded by: William Cushing; Thomas Tweedie
- Succeeded by: Alexander McGillivray; John Irwin; George Webster; Robert Parkyn
- Constituency: Calgary

Member of the Legislative Assembly of Alberta Province at Large
- In office 1917–1921

Personal details
- Born: May 18, 1879 Ethel, Ontario
- Died: July 3, 1956 (aged 77) Calgary, Alberta
- Party: None (independent)
- Education: University of Toronto
- Occupation: soldier, politician

Captain Robert Pearson (May 18, 1879 – July 3, 1956) was a Canadian soldier and politician from Alberta. He served as a Member of the Legislative Assembly of Alberta for two terms, from 1917 to 1926.

== Early life ==
Robert Pearson was born May 18, 1879, in Ethel, Ontario, to Robert Pearson and Susan Musgrove, he was educated at Listowel High School, and later attended Toronto University attaining a Bachelor of Arts. Pearson married Beulah P. Colling on September 16, 1908, and have one daughter. During the First World War, he served overseas with the Canadian Expeditionary Force 49th Battalion and 31st Battalion, being promoted to the rank of captain.

== Political career ==
Pearson was elected as a non-partisan member of the 4th Alberta Legislature in the 1917 Alberta general election as one of two Army members elected to represent soldiers and nurses fighting overseas in the First World War. Roberta MacAdams was elected to the other seat with just a few less votes than Pearson's total.

He kept his seat in the legislature after the war and was re-elected to the Legislature in the 1921 Alberta general election. In 1921 he was the fifth person elected through the block voting election system in the Calgary electoral district to the 5th Alberta Legislature. Like during his first term, Pearson served his second term in office as an Independent member. He did not run in 1926 and retired from the legislature at that time.
