= 1921 Alberta general election =

- July 18, 1921

61 seats in the Legislative Assembly of Alberta 31 seats needed for a majority
- Turnout: not available (Note: turn-out figure not available because the official Report on Alberta Elections does not give turn-out figure and does not give number of eligible voters in Edmonton and Calgary. Also block voting in those cities confuses strict accounting; as does election of one MLA by acclamation, but in 1926 when about the same number of voters turned out in the cities, the turn-outs there were about 50-60 percent.)
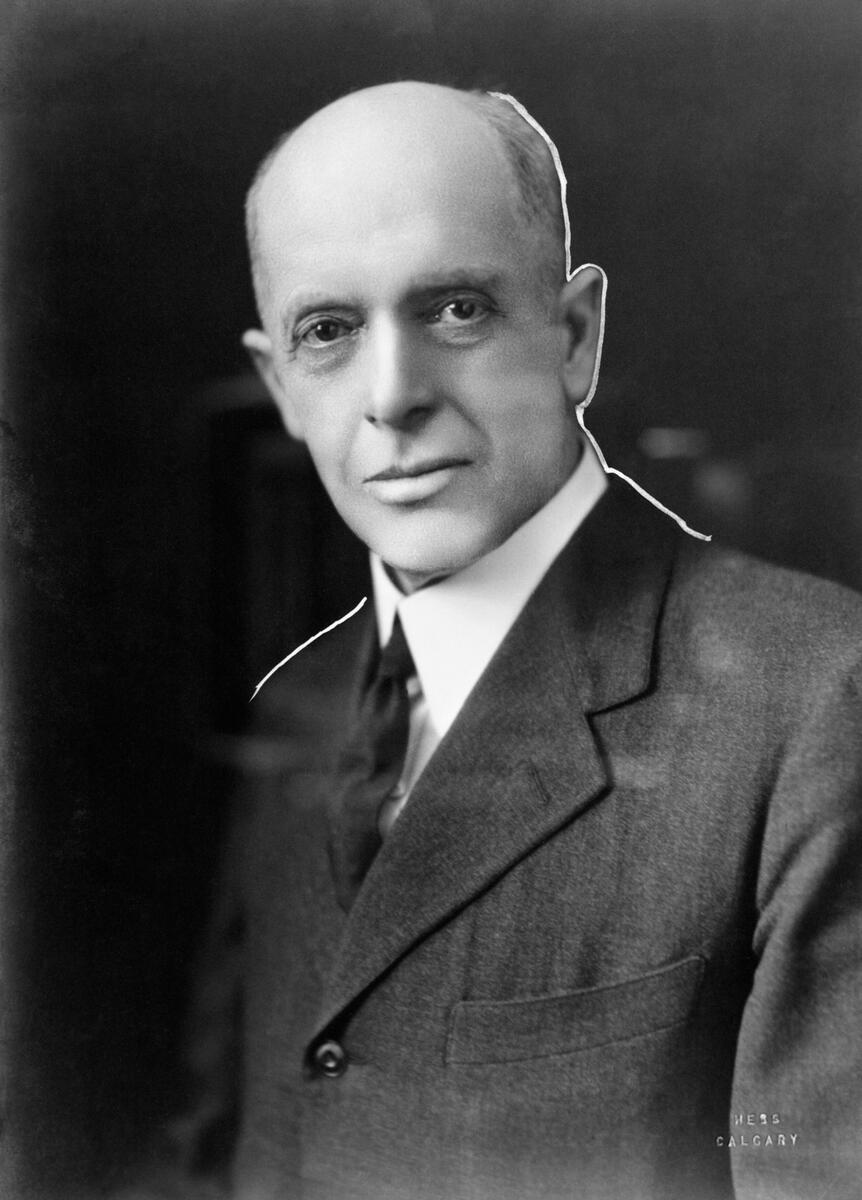

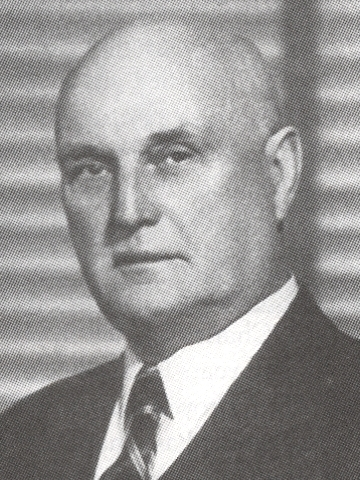

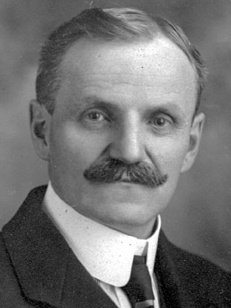
| | Majority party | Minority party |
|---|---|---|
| Leader | Henry Wise Wood (Note: Henry Wise Wood was president of the UFA but did not contest a seat himself. Following the election, he declined to become premier, and the UFA caucus selected Herbert Greenfield instead.) | Charles Stewart |
| Party | United Farmers | Liberal |
| Leader since | 1919 | 1917 |
| Leader's seat | Did not run | Sedgewick |
| Last election | Pre-creation | 34 seats, 48.1% |
| Seats before | 2 | 32 |
| Seats won | 38 | 15 |
| Seat change | ▲36 | ▼17 |
| Popular vote | 86,250 | 101,584 (Note: Vote count skewed by multiple voting in Calgary, Edmonton, and Medicine Hat.) |
| Percentage | 28.9% | 34.1% |
| Swing | ▲28.9 | ▼14.0% |
| | Third party | Fourth party |
| | DLP |
| Leader | Holmes Jowett | Albert Ewing |
| Party | Dominion Labor | Conservative |
| Leader since | 1921 | 1921 |
| Leader's seat | Did not run | Ran in Edmonton (lost) |
| Last election | 1 seat, 3.2% | 19 seats, 41.8% |
| Seats before | 1 | 18 |
| Seats won | 4 | 1 |
| Seat change | ▲3 | ▼17 |
| Popular vote | 33,987 | 32,734 |
| Percentage | 11.4% | 11.0% |
| Swing | ▲8.2% | ▼30.8% |
Premier before election
Charles Stewart
Liberal
Premier after election
Herbert Greenfield
United Farmers

The 1921 Alberta general election was held on July 18, 1921, to elect members to the 5th Alberta Legislative Assembly. The United Farmers of Alberta is elected to replace the Liberal government. It was one of only five times that Alberta changed governments.

A very-new United Farmers of Alberta political party defeated the Liberal Party, which had governed the province since its creation in 1905, led by Charles Stewart at the time of the election. The UFA, an agricultural lobby organization formed in 1909, was contesting its first general election. It had previously elected one MLA in a by-election.

Under the Block Voting system used in Edmonton and Calgary, each city voter could vote for up to five candidates. Medicine Hat also used block voting. Voters there could vote for up to two candidates. All other districts remained one voter – one vote, with the winner decided by first-past-the-post voting.

No party ran a full slate of candidates province-wide. The UFA ran candidates in most of the rural constituencies, and one in Edmonton. The Liberal Party ran candidates in almost all the constituencies. The Conservatives ran a bare dozen candidates, mostly in the cities. Labour mostly avoided running against UFA candidates, by running candidates in the cities and in Rocky Mountain, where it counted on coal miners' votes.

The United Farmers took most of the rural seats, doing particularly well in the heavily Protestant south of the province. The UFA candidate won a majority of the votes in every rural constituency where the UFA ran candidates.

Labour took four seats, two in Calgary. Alex Ross, Labour MLA, was named to the UFA government cabinet, in a sort of coalition government.

The Liberals took all the seats in Edmonton, due to the block-voting system in use. This multiple-vote system also skewed the vote count.

== The campaign ==
=== Liberals and the AGT scandal ===
The Liberal Party, which had governed the province since 1905, were led into the election by its third Premier and leader, Charles Stewart.

The Alberta Government Telephones scandal broke during the campaign. Albertans learned that the Liberals had tried to garner support and votes by directing the government-owned Alberta Government Telephones company to buy telephone poles and have them crated and shipped in big stacks to remote communities. This was intended to give the impression that if the Liberal government was re-elected, AGT would install phone lines there, when the government had no such plan.

=== United Farmers ===
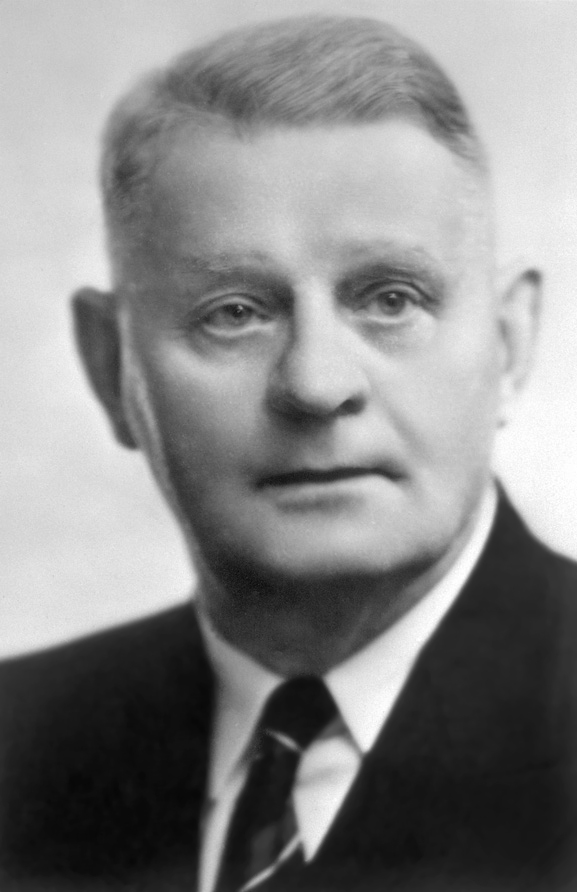
Herbert Greenfield's Premier portrait

The United Farmers of Alberta under the leadership of President Henry Wise Wood was contesting its first general election. The UFA's political wing, as a party, had come into being after the UFA had voted to no longer be content with being a lobby group. It merged with the Non-Partisan League of Alberta, which had formed before the 1917 general election and had two sitting members. Non-Partisan League activists were significant within the political machinery of the United Farmers.

The political strength of the merged party grew after deciding to participate in elections directly. It won its first victory with the election of Alexander Moore in the Cochrane district in 1919 and achieved a coup when Conservative leader George Hoadley crossed the floor. The two Non-Partisan League MLAs, despite not changing their affiliation, caucused with the two new United Farmers MLAs.

The UFA platform included a promise to reform the electoral system, calling for proportional representation. The UFA published pro-reform findings of Alberta Legislature clerk John D. Hunt under the title Present Electoral system condemned - John D. Hunt, clerk of the Legislative Council, denounces system which allows manipulation by unscrupulous politicians. Proportional Representation only fair method -- Works well with occupational groups. Also attacks autocratic power of cabinet and caucus. Its campaign literature ("UFA Reconstructive Legislative Program") called for "Proportional Representation for all classes of the community according to their numerical strength." This was to be produced by "Proportional Representation [in the cities] and a preferential ballot [IRV] in the single-member constituencies." (Manitoba Free Press, July 25, 1921)

Wise Wood stated midway through the election campaign that his party was going to form government. In a famous speech he gave in Medicine Hat on July 8, 1921, he was quoted as saying "Farmers may not be ready to take over government, but they are going to do it anyway". He also said in that speech that he would have preferred that only his 20 best candidates were elected, to form the opposition, but he said he expected there would be a lot more than that elected.

The UFA's sitting MLAs - George Hoadley (formerly a Conservative), Alexander Moore and James Weir, formerly of the NPL - were re-elected in 1921.

=== Split in the Labour forces in Edmonton ===
The campaign was contested by two provincial labour parties: a main party named the Dominion Labor Party and a separate group in Edmonton named the Independent Labor Party.

The Dominion Labor Party ran candidates in the primarily urban ridings of Calgary, Edmonton, Lethbridge and Medicine Hat. Its president, Holmes Jowatt, declined to seek office himself, instead devoting his energies to help candidates.

At the beginning of the election, Independent Labor Party offered to nominate Edmonton area candidates at a joint convention with the Edmonton DLP, to prevent the splitting of the labour vote in that district and use the co-operative good-will to eventually unite the parties. Edmonton being a multiple-member district meant a joint slate was feasible. The Dominion Labor Party declined the offer, stating that to do so would divide its own ticket.

Among the ILP candidates was pioneer photographer Ernest Brown, soon after to lead meetings of the Communist Party, which had been formed in May 1921.

For different reasons, in Calgary, sitting city councillor Annie Gale and F.C. Potts ran in Calgary as independent labour candidates. Both were unsuccessful.

=== Conservatives ===
The Conservative Party, which had been the primary opposition in the province since it was created in 1905, had suffered a split in the ranks under the leadership of George Hoadley. The caucus divided into two separate Conservative caucuses. Then Hoadley left the Conservative party to sit as an independent and then won the UFA nomination in Okotoks. The party replaced Hoadley by selecting Albert Ewing, an Edmonton area Member of the Legislative Assembly, as party leader.

Conservative candidates spent the campaign criticizing the wasteful and extravagant spending of the Liberal government. They also reminded Alberta voters of the Alberta Government Telephones telephone pole scandal. The Conservatives campaigned for reforms to the provincial tax code, provincial resource rights and voter list reforms in the Election Act.

Despite the split in the party the Conservative campaign attracted some high-profile support. Former Liberal Premier Alexander Rutherford a big supporter of Ewing, led the campaign for the five Conservative candidates contesting for Edmonton seats.

The Conservative party was a long time recovering from the split in the party. Supporters of Hoadley and their rural base moved to the United Farmers. The change caused by amalgamating the districts in Calgary and Edmonton to a city-wide district in each city did not help Conservative candidates. Nor did the block voting system that was imposed. In Edmonton the Liberal block, although just a minority of the votes cast, dominated and all five seats were captured by Liberal candidates. The only Conservative to return was Lethbridge MLA John Stewart. Albert Ewing went down to defeat in Edmonton.

=== Socialist Party of Canada ===
The Socialist Party had been in decline in Alberta since Charles O'Brien lost his seat in the 1913 general election. Two Socialist candidates ran in this election, under the banner Labour Socialist, Frank Williams in Calgary and Marie Mellard in Edmonton. Marie Mellard joined the new Communist Party within the year.

== Electoral system ==
In this election, 49 of the MLAs were elected in single-member districts using first-past-the-post voting. Another 12 (five in Edmonton, five in Calgary, and two in Medicine Hat) were elected through plurality block voting in city-wide districts. Each voter could cast as many votes as the number of seats being filled in the district.

=== Effect of urban voters casting multiple votes ===
In Edmonton, the Liberal, Conservative and Independent Labour Party slates each contained a woman candidate among the men candidates. Such balance is often seen when multi-name slates are composed to fight for multiple seats in the same district. In the Liberal's case, the inclusion of a woman (Nellie McClung) on the totally-victorious slate caused the election of one of the first woman MLAs in the British Empire.

The ability of urban voters to cast more votes than rural voters also had statistical effects. Liberal candidates won a larger share of the votes cast than the UFA (about 34%, compared to 29% for the UFA). But the popular vote numbers exaggerate the actual number of Liberal party supporters.

Urban voters in Calgary and Edmonton were allowed to place five votes and Medicine Hat voters 2 votes, as the block voting system was used in the cities and Edmonton and Calgary contained 5 seats each and Medicine Hat 2 seats. Voters in the other constituencies, most of which were contested by the UFA, only had one vote each under the first past the post electoral system. The United Farmers ran no candidate in Calgary and only a single candidate in Edmonton. Thus it did not benefit from the multiple city vote.

This over-representation of big-city voters was so significant that more than 120,000 more votes were counted than there were voters voting. This is significant as no single party received more than 102,000 votes. In Calgary 17,000 voters cast about 76,000 votes. As none of these went to UFA candidates (none ran in Calgary), this massive multiple voting going elsewhere gave the UFA a lower proportion overall.

The Liberal Party received 28,000 votes in Edmonton and 20,000 votes in Calgary, almost half of their total across the province, under this system where each big-city Liberal voter could lodge five votes for the party. If you give the Liberal Party only one-fifth of their vote tally in Edmonton and Calgary, the Liberal Party total vote count decreases to well below the UFA total. Now it could be that each voter in Edmonton gave one of his/her votes to the Liberals (but not likely), but even so the Liberal candidates in Edmonton received 8,000 more votes in Edmonton than there were voters who voted. In Calgary, the Liberal candidates received 3,000 more votes than there were voters who voted. The combined minimum total of 11,000 "over-votes" accounts for a great deal of 15,000-vote difference between the Liberal's and the UFA's tallies province-wide.

It was also noted by defenders of the government that the UFA's percentage of total seats (62 per cent) was identical to the percentage of votes it received on average in the constituencies in which it did run candidates.

== Aftermath ==
The result of the election radically and forever altered the political landscape of the province. The United Farmers won a majority government, mostly with rural MLAs predominantly from the south of the province, while the Liberals, formerly in power, were moved to the opposition side of the Chamber with MLAs in the cities of Calgary and Edmonton and some northern strongholds. The Liberals have never won power again; the closest they have come since then was winning 39 seats and opposition status in 1993.

As well from 1921 to 1971, the Alberta provincial government was not the same as either of the two largest parties in the House of Commons. From 1911 to 1979, 1980-1984, 1993-2006 and from 2015 to the present, the Alberta provincial government and the House of Commons were not controlled by parties of the same name. (This made for interesting meetings between Alberta premiers and the Prime Minister, such as in First Ministers' Conferences.)

The 38 MLAs who attended the first United Farmers caucus meeting voted unanimously for UFA President Henry Wise Wood to lead the government as premier. Wood declined becoming premier saying he was more interested in operating the machinery of the United Farmers movement rather than crafting government policy. He had actually opposed the UFA becoming a political party for fear that political in-fighting would break up the movement. He said he feared that the UFA would repeat what had happened elsewhere when farmers movements engaged in electoral politics, rose to power and tore themselves apart. He said he wanted to remain focused on the farmers movement as a non-partisan movement and as an economic group instead of as a political party.

The UFA vice-president, Percival Baker, had won in his district (Ponoka) with a majority of votes, but had been badly injured in a tree-falling accident during the campaign. He died the day after the election. It was speculated he would have had at least a place in the cabinet if he had lived. (A subsequent by-election elected the UFA candidate, John E. Brownlee.)

The United Farmers caucus finally chose Herbert Greenfield, a UFA executive member who had not run in the election, to become premier. In December 1921, predicting satisfaction of the UFA's election promise of proportional representation, Premier Greenfield said "every election that has been held recently merely adds to the force of the arguments advanced in favour of PR" and said the next provincial election would be held using PR.)

== Results ==
| Party | Party Leader | # of candidates | Seats | | | Popular Vote | | |
|---|---|---|---|---|---|---|---|---|
| Party | Party Leader | # of candidates | 1917 | Elected | % Change | # | % | % Change |
| United Farmers | Henry Wise Wood | 45 | * | 38 | * | 86,250 | 28.92% | * |
| Liberal | Charles Stewart | 61 | 34 | 15 | -55.9% | 101,584 | 34.07% | -8.99% |
| Dominion Labor | Holmes Jowett | 10 | 1 | 4 | +300% | 33,987 | 11.40% | +8.56% |
| Independent | | 18 | 2 | 3 | +50.0% | 28,794 | 9.66% | +4.44% |
| Conservative | Albert Ewing | 13 | 19 | 1 | -94.7% | 32,734 | 10.98% | -26.4% |
| Independent Labour | | 7 | * | - | * | 10,733 | 3.60% | * |
| Socialist | | 2 | - | - | 0.0% | 2,628 | 0.88% | +0.26% |
| Independent Liberal | | 1 | * | - | * | 1,467 | 0.49% | * |
| Sub-total | | 157 | 56 | 61 | +8.9% | 298,177 | 100% | |
| Soldiers' vote (Province at large) | | 0 | 2 | - | - | - | - | -20.33% |
| Total | | 157 | 58 | 61 | +5.2% | 298,177 | 100% | |
Sources: Elections Alberta; "Alberta provincial election results". Elections Alberta. Archived from the original on February 11, 2008.

Popular vote
| Liberal | 34.07% |
| United Farmers | 28.92% |
| Dominion Labor | 11.40% |
| Conservative | 10.98% |
| Others | 14.63% |

Seats summary
| United Farmers | 62.30% |
| Liberal | 24.59% |
| Dominion Labor | 6.56% |
| Conservative | 1.64% |
| Others | 4.92% |

== Members elected ==
| Electoral district | Candidates | | | | | Incumbent |
| Electoral district | Liberal | United Farmers | Conservative | Labour | Other | Incumbent |
|---|---|---|---|---|---|---|
| Acadia | James C. Cottrell; 906; 22.58% | Lorne Proudfoot; 3,106; 77.42% | | | | John A. McColl |
| Alexandra | Theodore H. Currie; 282; 11.38% | Peter J. Enzenauer; 2,195; 88.62% | | | | James R. Lowery |
| Athabasca | George Mills; 1,043; 70.43% | | John Angelo; 438; 29.57% | | | Alexander Grant MacKay |
| Beaver River | Joseph M. Dechene; 1,560; 62.33% | H. Montambault; 943; 37.67% | | | | Wilfrid Gariepy |
| Bow Valley | Charles Richmond Mitchell; 1,694; 72.30% | George A. Love; 649; 27.70% | | | | Charles Richmond Mitchell |
| Camrose | George P. Smith; 2,391; 44.03% | Vernor W. Smith; 3,040; 55.97% | | | | George P. Smith |
| Cardston | Martin Woolf; 615; 31.46% | George Lewis Stringam; 1,340; 68.54% | | | | Martin Woolf |
| Claresholm | | Louise McKinney; 763; 48.54% | | | Thomas Charles Milnes (Ind.); 809; 51.46% | Louise McKinney |
| Clearwater | Joseph E. State; 234; 41.94% | | | | Robert G. Campbell; 117; 20.97% | Joseph E. State |
| Clearwater | O.T. Lee; 147; 26.34% | | | | S.W. Chambers; 60; 10.75% | Joseph E. State |
| Cochrane | A.S. McDonald; 541; 36.02% | Alexander Moore; 961; 63.98% | | | | Alexander Moore |
| Coronation | Arthur M. Day; 960; 20.44% | George Norman Johnston; 3,736; 79.56% | | | | William Wallace Wilson |
| Didsbury | George H. Webber; 1,734; 40.69% | Austin Bingley Claypool; 2,528; 59.31% | | | | Henry B. Atkins |
| Edson | Charles Wilson Cross; 1,321; 57.94% | | John Diamond; 959; 42.06% | | | Charles Wilson Cross |
| Gleichen | Harry Scott; 1,065; 40.49% | John C. Buckley; 1,565; 59.51% | | | | Fred Davis |
| Grouard | Jean Léon Côté; 963; 57.84% | Henry George Dimsdale; 702; 42.16% | | | | Jean Léon Côté |
| Hand Hills | Robert Berry Eaton; 1,583; 27.13% | Gordon A. Forster; 4,252; 72.87% | | | | Robert Berry Eaton |
| High River | J.V. Drumheller; 867; 46.09% | Samuel Brown; 1,014; 53.91% | | | | George Douglas Stanley |
| Innisfail | Daniel J. Morkeberg; 741; 30.85% | Donald Cameron; 1,661; 69.15% | | | | Daniel J. Morkeberg |
| Lac Ste. Anne | C.J. Stiles; 837; 32.98% | Charles Milton McKeen; 1,574; 62.02% | | | J.H. Mackay (Ind.); 127; 5.00% | George R. Barker |
| Lacombe | William Franklin Puffer; 1,539; 42.14% | Mary Irene Parlby; 2,113; 57.86% | | | | Andrew Gilmour |
| Leduc | Stanley G. Tobin; 1,351; 50.19% | D.S. Muir; 1,341; 49.81% | | | | Stanley G. Tobin |
| Lethbridge | | | | John Marsh; 1,374; 37.89% | John S. Stewart (Ind.); 2,252; 62.11% | |
| Little Bow | James McNaughton; 856; 35.52% | Oran Leo McPherson; 1,554; 64.48% | | | | James McNaughton |
| Macleod | George Skelding; 620; 46.03% | William H. Shield; 727; 53.97% | | | | George Skelding |
| Medicine Hat (Note: Medicine Hat elected two members to the Legislative Assembly) | Oliver Boyd; 2,278; 18.9% H. H. Foster; 2,013; 16.7% | Perren E. Baker; 4,165; 34.5% | | William G. Johnston; 3,602; 29.9% | | Nelson C. Spencer |
| Nanton | John M. Glendenning; 458; 38.65% | Daniel Harcourt Galbraith; 727; 61.35% | | | | James Weir |
| Okotoks | Ernest Austin Daggett; 390; 25.67% | George Hoadley; 1,129; 74.33% | | | | George Hoadley |
| Olds | Duncan Marshall; 1,238; 39.50% | Nelson S. Smith; 1,896; 60.50% | | | | Duncan Marshall |
| Peace River | | Donald MacBeth Kennedy; 3,291; 62.69% | | | | William A. Rae |
| Pembina | J.H. Phillips; 540; 21.40% | George MacLachlan; 1,838; 72.85% | | | F.D. Armitage (Ind.); 145; 5.75% | Gordon MacDonald |
| Pincher Creek | Harvey Bossenberry; 471; 34.43% | Earle G. Cook; 572; 41.81% | | | A.E. Cox; 192; 14.01% Donald Randolph McIvor; 133; 9.72% | John H.W.S. Kemmis |
| Ponoka | William A. Campbell; 815; 36.94% | P. Baker; 1,391; 63.06% | | | | Charles Orin Cunningham |
| Red Deer | John J. Gaetz; 1,146; 34.66% | George Wilbert Smith; 2,160; 65.34% | | | | Edward Michener |
| Redcliff | Charles S. Pingle; 1,387; 41.56% | William C. Smith; 1,950; 58.44% | | | | Charles S. Pingle |
| Ribstone | James Gray Turgeon; 909; 29.31% | Charles O.F. Wright; 2,192; 70.69% | | | | James Gray Turgeon |
| Rocky Mountain | Alexander M. Morrison; 1,143; 35.08% | Wallace James Sharpe; 811; 24.89% | | Philip Martin Christophers; 1,304; 40.02% | | Robert E. Campbell |
| Sedgewick | Charles Stewart; Acclaimed | | | | | Charles Stewart |
| St. Albert | Lucien Boudreau; 1,000; 44.76% | Telesphore St. Arnaud; 1,234; 55.24% | | | | Lucien Boudreau |
| St. Paul | Prosper-Edmond Lessard; 984; 41.66% | Laudas Joly; 1,378; 58.34% | | | | Prosper-Edmond Lessard |
| Stettler | Edward H. Prudden; 1,608; 34.11% | Albert L. Sanders; 3,106; 65.89% | | | | Edward H. Prudden |
| Stony Plain | Jacob Miller; 647; 32.33% | Willard M. Washburn; 1,001; 50.02% | Frederick W. Lundy; 306; 15.29% | | Dan Brox (Ind.); 47; 2.35% | Frederick W. Lundy |
| Sturgeon | John Robert Boyle; 7,310; 72.20% | Samuel Allen Carson; 2,815; 27.80% | | | | John Robert Boyle |
| Taber | Archibald J. McLean; 1,991; 46.30% | Lawrence Peterson; 2,309; 53.70% | | | | Archibald J. McLean |
| Vegreville | Joseph S. McCallum; 1,325; 30.31% | Archibald Malcolm Matheson; 3,047; 69.69% | | | | Joseph S. McCallum |
| Vermilion | Arthur W. Ebbett; 939; 24.11% | Richard Gavin Reid; 2,955; 75.89% | | | | Arthur W. Ebbett |
| Victoria | Francis A. Walker; 1,288; 47.90% | Wasyl Fedun; 1,401; 52.10% | | | | Francis A. Walker |
| Wainwright | Harcus Strachan; 913; 28.10% | John Russell Love; 1,877; 57.77% | George LeRoy Hudson; 459; 14.13% | | | George LeRoy Hudson |
| Warner | Frank S. Leffingwell; 490; 39.36% | Maurice Joy Conner; 755; 60.64% | | | | Frank S. Leffingwell |
| Wetaskiwin | Hugh John Montgomery; 1,216; 44.64% | Evert E. Sparks; 1,508; 55.36% | | | | Hugh John Montgomery |
| Whitford | Andrew S. Shandro; Acclaimed | | | | | Andrew S. Shandro |

10 by-elections were held in the months after the election. Some were held to sit several UFA MLAs and one Labour MLA in the new cabinet. Herbert Greenfield after being chosen to serve as premier ran for a seat in a by-election. John Brownlee after being chosen to serve as a cabinet minister ran for a seat in a by-election. Another was held after a Liberal MLA (Andrew Shandro) was thrown down for taking a seat under suspicious circumstances. All were successful for the UFA (and one Labour).

=== Calgary ===
5th Alberta Legislative Assembly
| District | Member | Party |
| Calgary | Alex Ross | Dominion Labor |
| Calgary | Robert Edwards | Independent |
| Calgary | Fred White | Dominion Labor |
| Calgary | Robert Marshall | Liberal |
| Calgary | Robert Pearson | Independent |

=== Edmonton ===
5th Alberta Legislative Assembly
| District | Member | Party |
| Edmonton | Andrew McLennan | Liberal |
| Edmonton | John C. Bowen | Liberal |
| Edmonton | Nellie McClung | Liberal |
| Edmonton | John Boyle | Liberal |
| Edmonton | Jeremiah Heffernan | Liberal |
