= John M. Glendenning =

Canadian politician (1872–1962)

J. M. Glendenning
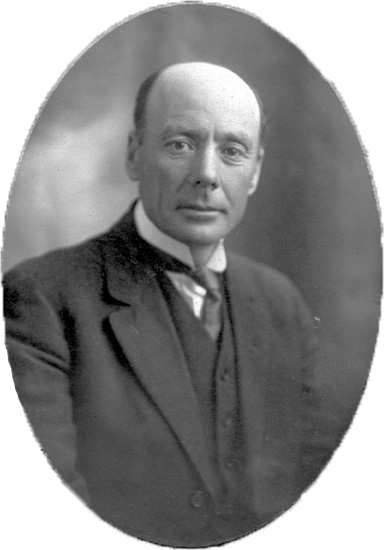

Member of the Legislative Assembly of Alberta
- In office 1909–1917
- Succeeded by: James Weir
- Constituency: Nanton

Personal details
- Born: May 22, 1872 Bennington, Ontario
- Died: March 17, 1962 (aged 89) Calgary, Alberta
- Party: Liberal
- Occupation: politician

John Murray Glendenning (May 22, 1872 – March 17, 1962) was a politician in Alberta, Canada. He was born in Bennington, Ontario.

Glendenning ran as a Liberal candidate for a seat to the Legislative Assembly of Alberta in the 1909 Alberta general election in the new Nanton electoral district. He won an upset victory, defeating a sitting MLA, Conservative party leader Albert Robertson, whose old district had been abolished due to redistribution.

Glendenning won a second term in office in the 1913 Alberta general election by defeating Conservative challenger and mayor of Nanton John Thomas Cooper.

In the 1917 Alberta general election he ran for a third term in the seat but was defeated by candidate James Weir of the radical farmer group, the Non-Partisan League. He tried to regain his seat again in the 1921 Alberta general election but was again defeated, this time by former NPL candidate Daniel Harcourt Galbraith, who this time was running as a candidate of the United Farmers of Alberta.

He died in 1962 in Calgary and was buried in Nanton, Alberta.

Legislative Assembly of Alberta
Preceded by New District	MLA Nanton; 1909–1917	Succeeded by James Weir
