= Bow Valley (provincial electoral district) =

Defunct provincial electoral district in Alberta, Canada

Coordinates: 51.022°N 115.259°W

Alberta electoral district

Defunct provincial electoral district
- Legislature: Legislative Assembly of Alberta
- District created: 1913
- District abolished: 1940
- District re-created: 1971
- District re-abolished: 1997
- First contested: 1913
- Last contested: 1993

Bow Valley was a provincial electoral district in Alberta, Canada, mandated to return a single member to the Legislative Assembly of Alberta from 1913 to 1940, and again from 1971 to 1997.

== History ==
From 1924 to 1952, the district used instant-runoff voting to elect its MLA.

Members of the Legislative Assembly for Bow Valley
Assembly	Years	Member	Party
See Gleichen electoral district from 1905-1913 and Lethbridge District from 1909-1913
3rd	1913–1913	George Lane	Liberal
3rd	1913–1917	Charles Richmond Mitchell	Liberal
4th	1917–1921	Charles Richmond Mitchell	Liberal
5th	1921–1926	Charles Richmond Mitchell	Liberal
6th	1926–1930	Joseph Tweed Shaw	Liberal
7th	1930–1935	John Mackintosh	Independent
8th	1935–1940	Wilson E. Cain	Social Credit
See Edson electoral district from 1940-1971 and Bow Valley-Empress electoral district from 1940-1971
17th	1971–1975	Fred Mandeville	Social Credit
18th	1975–1979	Fred Mandeville	Social Credit
19th	1979–1982	Fred Mandeville	Social Credit
20th	1982–1986	Tom Musgrove	Progressive Conservative
21st	1986–1989	Tom Musgrove	Progressive Conservative
22nd	1989–1993	Tom Musgrove	Progressive Conservative
23rd	1993–1997	Lyle Oberg	Progressive Conservative
See Strathmore-Brooks electoral district from 1996-2019, Drumheller-Chinook electoral district from 1996-2004 and Cypress-Medicine Hat electoral district from 1996-Present

The Bow Valley electoral district was formed in 1913 from the Gleichen and Lethbridge District electoral districts. Bow Valley would be abolished prior to the 1940 Alberta general election, primarily forming Bow Valley-Empress electoral district, and a small portion added to Edson electoral district.

Bow Valley was revived in the 1970 electoral district re-distribution from the Bow Valley-Empress electoral district.

In the 1996 electoral district re-distribution, the Bow Valley electoral district was abolished and the territory was divided among Strathmore-Brooks, Drumheller-Chinook and Cypress-Medicine Hat electoral districts. The Electoral Boundaries Commission drafted the report with the intention of the Strathmore-Brooks electoral district retaining the name "Bow Valley".

=== Members of the Legislative Assembly (MLAs) ===
The 1926 Alberta general election would be the first held under single transferable vote in rural districts. Liberal leader Joseph Tweed Shaw came in second in the first count to United Farmers of Alberta candidate Ben S. Plumer. However, as per the rules of Instant-runoff voting, Plumer was not declared elected because he did not have a majority of the votes. After the least popular candidate was eliminated and his votes transferred, Shaw accumulated a majority and was declared elected. Shaw won the district by one vote.

== Election results ==
=== 1913 ===
1913 Alberta general election
Party	Candidate	Votes	%
Liberal	George Lane	396	61.78%
Conservative	Harold William Hounsfield Riley	245	38.22%
Total		641	
Source(s) Source: "Bow Valley Official Results 1913 Alberta general election". Alberta Heritage Community Foundation.

=== 1913 by-election ===
Alberta provincial by-election, June 12, 1913
Party	Candidate	Votes
Liberal	Charles Richmond Mitchell	Acclaimed
Called due to resignation of G. Lane to provide seat
Source: "By-elections for the Period of 1905 – 1973". Elections Alberta.

=== 1917 ===
1917 Alberta general election
Party	Candidate	Votes	%	±%
Liberal	Charles Richmond Mitchell	604	58.13%	-3.65%
Conservative	Edmund F. Purcell	435	41.87%	3.65%
Total		1,039	–	–
Rejected, spoiled and declined		N/A	–	–
Eligible electors / turnout		1,466	70.87%	11.58%
Liberal hold		Swing		-3.65%
Source(s) Source: "Bow Valley Official Results 1917 Alberta general election". Alberta Heritage Community Foundation.

=== 1921 ===
1921 Alberta general election
Party	Candidate	Votes	%	±%
Liberal	Charles Richmond Mitchell	1,694	72.30%	14.17%
United Farmers	George A. Love	649	27.70%	–
Total		2,343	–	–
Rejected, spoiled and declined		N/A	–	–
Eligible electors / turnout		2,669	N/A	N/A
Liberal hold		Swing		14.17%
Source(s) Source: "Bow Valley Official Results 1921 Alberta general election". Alberta Heritage Community Foundation.

=== 1926 ===
The leader in first count was not elected in the end after transfer of votes belonging to the least-popular candidate.

1926 Alberta general election
Party	Candidate	Votes 1st count	%	Votes final count	±%
Liberal	Joseph Tweed Shaw	847	35.94%	1,048	-36.36%
United Farmers	Ben S. Plumer	869	36.87%	1,047	9.17%
Conservative	Edmund F. Purcell	641	27.20%	–	–
Total		2,357	–	–	–
Rejected, spoiled and declined		188	–	–	–
Eligible electors / turnout		3,750	67.87%	–	–
Liberal hold		Swing		-22.77%	
Source(s) Source: "Bow Valley Official Results 1926 Alberta general election". Alberta Heritage Community Foundation. Instant-runoff voting requires a candidate to receive a plurality (greater than 50%) of the votes. As no candidate received a plurality of votes, the bottom candidate was eliminated and their 2nd place votes were applied to both other candidates until one received a plurality.

=== 1930 ===
1930 Alberta general election
Party	Candidate	Votes	%	±%
Independent	John Mackintosh	1,253	56.65%	–
United Farmers	L.P. Schooling	959	43.35%	6.49%
Total		2,212	–	–
Rejected, spoiled and declined		189	–	–
Eligible electors / turnout		2,936	81.78%	13.91%
Independent gain from Liberal		Swing		7.11%
Source(s) Source: "Bow Valley Official Results 1930 Alberta general election". Alberta Heritage Community Foundation.

=== 1935 ===
1935 Alberta general election
Party	Candidate	Votes	%	±%
Social Credit	Wilson E. Cain	1,776	59.76%	–
Liberal	David Nelson	591	19.89%	–
United Farmers	J. M. Wheatley	401	13.49%	-29.86%
Independent	John Mackintosh	204	6.86%	-49.78%
Total		2,972	–	–
Rejected, spoiled and declined		127	–	–
Eligible electors / turnout		3,606	85.94%	4.16%
Social Credit gain from Independent		Swing		13.29%
Source(s) Source: "Bow Valley Official Results 1935 Alberta general election". Alberta Heritage Community Foundation.

=== 1971 ===
1971 Alberta general election
Party	Candidate	Votes	%	±%
Social Credit	Fred Mandeville	3,584	68.16%	–
Progressive Conservative	Don Murray	1,674	31.84%	–
Total		5,258	–	–
Rejected, spoiled and declined		39	–	–
Eligible electors / turnout		6,877	77.02%	–
Social Credit pickup new district.				
Source(s) Source: "Bow Valley Official Results 1971 Alberta general election". Alberta Heritage Community Foundation.

=== 1975 ===
1975 Alberta general election
Party	Candidate	Votes	%	±%
Social Credit	Fred Mandeville	2,992	58.89%	-9.28%
Progressive Conservative	Jim C. George	1,906	37.51%	5.68%
New Democratic	Syd Evans	183	3.60%	–
Total		5,081	–	–
Rejected, spoiled and declined		14	–	–
Eligible electors / turnout		7,981	63.84%	-13.18%
Social Credit hold		Swing		-7.48%
Source(s) Source: "Bow Valley Official Results 1975 Alberta general election". Alberta Heritage Community Foundation.

=== 1979 ===
1979 Alberta general election
Party	Candidate	Votes	%	±%
Social Credit	Fred Mandeville	4,123	59.81%	0.92%
Progressive Conservative	Paul Bartlett	2,484	36.03%	-1.48%
New Democratic	Ron Wickson	201	2.92%	-0.69%
Liberal	Brian Nearing	86	1.25%	–
Total		6,894	–	–
Rejected, spoiled and declined		21	–	–
Eligible electors / turnout		10,076	68.63%	4.79%
Social Credit hold		Swing		1.20%
Source(s) Source: "Bow Valley Official Results 1979 Alberta general election". Alberta Heritage Community Foundation.

=== 1982 ===
1982 Alberta general election
Party	Candidate	Votes	%	±%
Progressive Conservative	Tom N. Musgrove	4,541	60.34%	24.31%
Independent	Murray Erickson	2,719	36.13%	–
New Democratic	Bradley Neubauer	266	3.53%	0.62%
Total		7,526	–	–
Rejected, spoiled and declined		35	–	–
Eligible electors / turnout		10,985	68.83%	0.20%
Progressive Conservative gain from Social Credit		Swing		0.22%
Source(s) Source: "Bow Valley Official Results 1982 Alberta general election". Alberta Heritage Community Foundation.

=== 1986 ===
1986 Alberta general election
Party	Candidate	Votes	%	±%
Progressive Conservative	Tom N. Musgrove	3,395	57.88%	-2.46%
Representative	Martha Andrews	1,220	20.80%	–
Liberal	Bud Olson	1,046	17.83%	–
New Democratic	Vanore Voaklander	205	3.49%	-0.04%
Total		5,866	–	–
Rejected, spoiled and declined		6	–	–
Eligible electors / turnout		12,287	47.79%	-21.04%
Progressive Conservative hold		Swing		6.43%
Source(s) Source: "Bow Valley Official Results 1986 Alberta general election". Alberta Heritage Community Foundation.

=== 1989 ===
1989 Alberta general election
Party	Candidate	Votes	%	±%
Progressive Conservative	Tom N. Musgrove	3,405	60.46%	2.58%
Liberal	George Timko	1,561	27.72%	9.89%
New Democratic	Larry D. Kern	666	11.83%	8.33%
Total		5,632	–	–
Rejected, spoiled and declined		12	–	–
Eligible electors / turnout		11,486	49.14%	1.35%
Progressive Conservative hold		Swing		-2.17%
Source(s) Source: "Bow Valley Official Results 1989 Alberta general election". Alberta Heritage Community Foundation.

=== 1993 ===
1993 Alberta general election
Party	Candidate	Votes	%	±%
Progressive Conservative	Lyle Oberg	5,403	61.25%	0.79%
Liberal	Peter Hansen	2,424	27.48%	-0.24%
New Democratic	Richard Knutson	558	6.33%	-5.50%
Social Credit	Reuben Huber	436	4.94%	–
Total		8,821	–	–
Rejected, spoiled and declined		17	–	–
Eligible electors / turnout		14,327	61.69%	12.55%
Progressive Conservative hold		Swing		0.52%
Source(s) Source: "Bow Valley Official Results 1993 Alberta general election". Alberta Heritage Community Foundation.

== See also ==
- List of Alberta provincial electoral districts
- Canadian provincial electoral districts
