= Nanton (provincial electoral district) =

Defunct provincial electoral district in Alberta, Canada

Alberta electoral district

Defunct provincial electoral district
- Legislature: Legislative Assembly of Alberta
- District created: 1909
- District abolished: 1930
- First contested: 1909
- Last contested: 1926

Nanton was a provincial electoral district in Alberta, Canada, mandated to return a single member to the Legislative Assembly of Alberta from 1909 to 1926.

== History ==
Members of the Legislative Assembly for Nanton
Assembly	Years	Member	Party
See High River electoral district from 1905-1909 and Macleod electoral district from 1905-1909
2nd	1909–1913	John M. Glendenning	Liberal
3rd	1913–1917	John M. Glendenning	Liberal
4th	1917–1921	James Weir	Nonpartisan League
5th	1921–1926	Daniel Harcourt Galbraith	United Farmers
6th	1926–1930	Daniel Harcourt Galbraith	United Farmers
See Nanton-Claresholm electoral district from 1930-1940

The Nanton electoral district was formed prior to the 1909 Alberta general election from a portion of the High River and Macleod electoral districts.

From 1924 to 1956, the district used instant-runoff voting to elect its MLA.

Prior to the 1930 Alberta general election, the Nanton electoral district was merged with a portion of the Claresholm electoral district to form the Nanton-Claresholm electoral district.

The electoral district was named after the town of Nanton.

== Election results ==
=== 1909 ===
1909 Alberta general election
Party	Candidate	Votes	%	±%
Liberal	John M. Glendenning	439	54.88%	–
Conservative	Albert J. Robertson	361	45.13%	–
Total		800	–	–
Rejected, spoiled and declined		N/A	–	–
Eligible electors / turnout		1,042	N/A	–
Liberal pickup new district.				
Source(s) Source: "Nanton Official Results 1909 Alberta general election". Alberta Heritage Community Foundation.

=== 1913 ===
1913 Alberta general election
Party	Candidate	Votes	%	±%
Liberal	John M. Glendenning	463	59.51%	4.64%
Conservative	John Thomas Cooper	315	40.49%	-4.64%
Total		778	–	–
Rejected, spoiled and declined		N/A	–	–
Eligible electors / turnout		954	81.55%	–
Liberal hold		Swing		4.64%
Source(s) Source: "Nanton Official Results 1913 Alberta general election". Alberta Heritage Community Foundation.

=== 1917 ===
1917 Alberta general election
Party	Candidate	Votes	%	±%
Non-Partisan League	James Weir	439	34.79%	–
Liberal	John M. Glendenning	415	32.88%	-26.63%
Conservative	John Thomas Cooper	408	32.33%	-8.16%
Total		1,262	–	–
Rejected, spoiled and declined		N/A	–	–
Eligible electors / turnout		N/A	N/A	–
Independent gain from Liberal		Swing		-8.56%
Source(s) Source: "Nanton Official Results 1917 Alberta general election". Alberta Heritage Community Foundation.

=== 1921 ===
1921 Alberta general election
Party	Candidate	Votes	%	±%
United Farmers	Daniel Harcourt Galbraith	727	61.35%	–
Liberal	John M. Glendenning	458	38.65%	5.77%
Total		1,185	–	–
Rejected, spoiled and declined		N/A	–	–
Eligible electors / turnout		N/A	N/A	–
United Farmers gain from Independent		Swing		10.40%
Source(s) Source: "Nanton Official Results 1921 Alberta general election". Alberta Heritage Community Foundation.

=== 1926 ===
1926 Alberta general election
Party	Candidate	Votes	%	±%
United Farmers	Daniel Harcourt Galbraith	745	57.75%	-3.60%
Conservative	W. H. Keen	341	26.43%	–
Liberal	D. Stanford	204	15.81%	-22.84%
Total		1,290	–	–
Rejected, spoiled and declined		73	–	–
Eligible electors / turnout		1,816	75.06%	–
United Farmers hold		Swing		4.31%
Source(s) Source: "Nanton Official Results 1926 Alberta general election". Alberta Heritage Community Foundation.

== See also ==
- List of Alberta provincial electoral districts
- Canadian provincial electoral districts
