= Daniel Harcourt Galbraith =

Canadian politician (1878–1968)

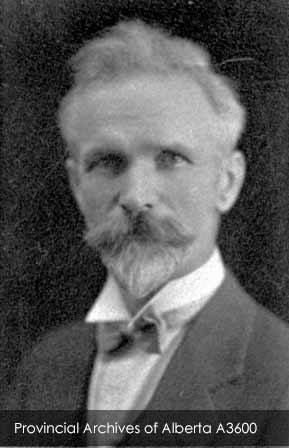

Member of the Legislative Assembly of Alberta
- In office July 18, 1921 – June 19, 1930
- Preceded by: James Weir
- Succeeded by: District abolished
- Constituency: Nanton

Personal details
- Born: November 30, 1878 Guelph, Ontario, Canada
- Died: October 30, 1968 (aged 89)
- Party: United Farmers
- Occupation: politician

Daniel Harcourt Galbraith (November 30, 1878 – October 30, 1968) was a provincial politician from Alberta, Canada. He served as a member of the Legislative Assembly of Alberta from 1921 to 1930 sitting with the United Farmers caucus in government.

== Early life ==
Galbraith was born in 1878 in Guelph, Ontario. His grandfather was Daniel Galbraith, a former Member of Parliament. He took his post secondary education at Ontario Agriculture College where he met his wife and married her. They settled in the Vulcan, Alberta area in 1904. They had three sons Doug, Curly & Robert (Bob) Galbraith.

Galbraith was good friends with Richard Bennett and Arthur Meighen who both served as Conservative prime ministers of Canada.

== Political career ==
In the 1917 federal election, Galbraith ran for a seat in the House of Commons of Canada as a Non-Partisan League candidate in the electoral district of Bow River. He placed third, and the seat was taken by Unionist government candidate Howard Halladay.

As a United Farmers of Alberta candidate, Galbraith ran for the Nanton seat in the Alberta Legislature in the 1921 Alberta general election. The sitting MLA James Weir of the Non-Partisan League did not run for re-election so Galbraith took on his mantle and defeated former Liberal MLA John Glendenning in a hotly contested two way race. The UFA were elected to majority government in this election.

Galbraith ran for re-election in 1926. He took an even larger majority of the votes, and won in a three way race. He did not run for re-election in 1930.
