= 1917 Alberta general election =

- 7 June 1917

58 seats in the Legislative Assembly of Alberta 30 seats were needed for a majority
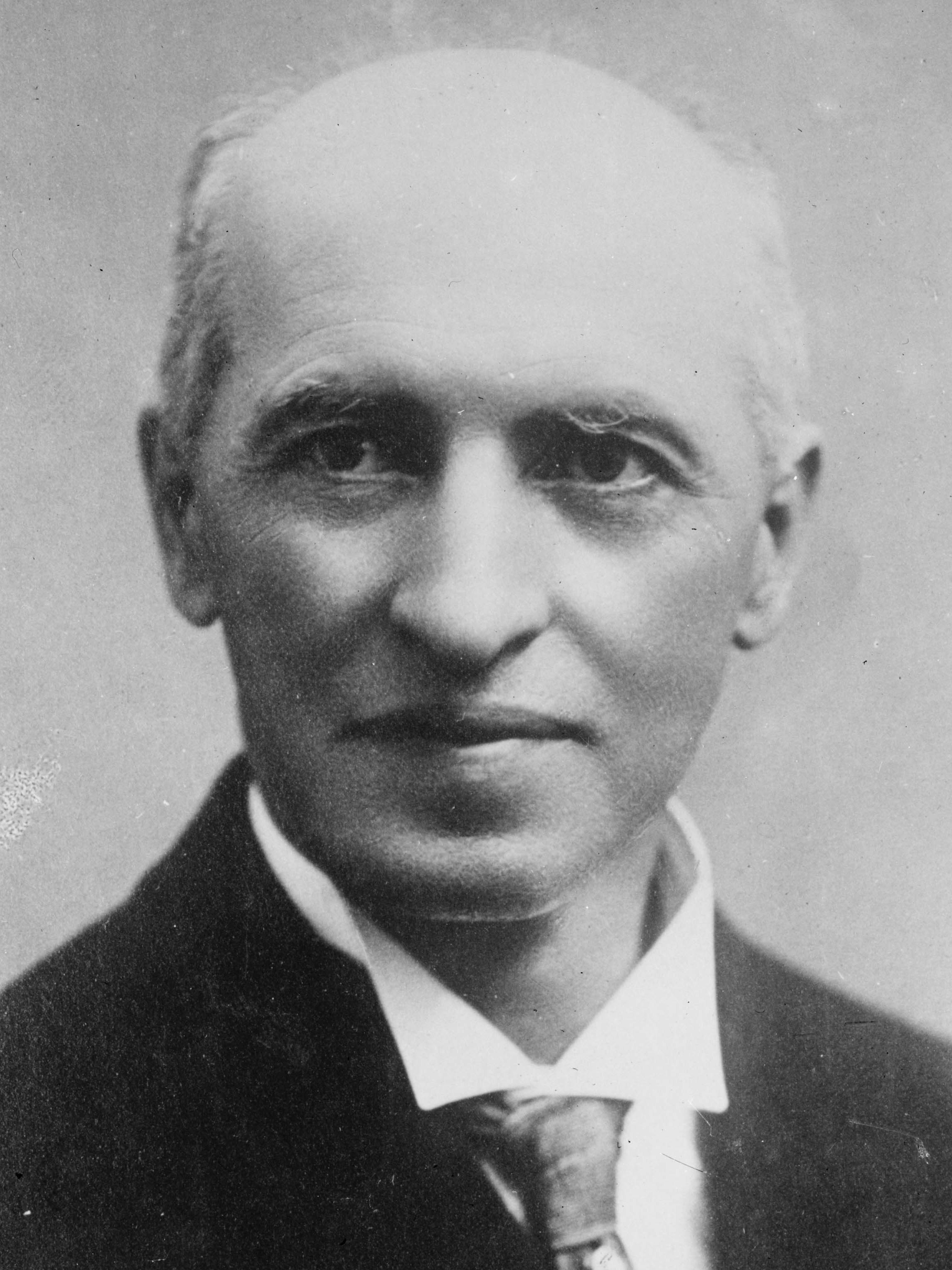

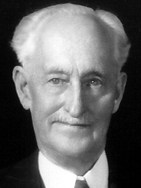

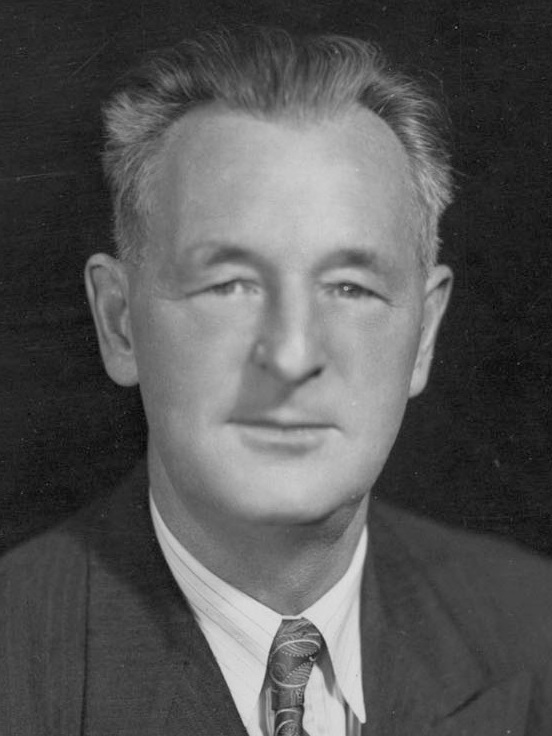
	Majority party	Minority party
Leader	Arthur Sifton	Edward Michener
Party	Liberal	Conservative
Leader since	1910	1910
Leader's seat	Vermilion	Red Deer
Last election	39 seats, 49.2%	17 seats, 45.1%
Seats before	39	17
Seats won	34	19
Seat change	▼5	▲2
Popular vote	54,212	47,055
Percentage	48.14%	41.79%
Swing	▼1.1%	▼3.3%
	Third party	Fourth party
	ANPL
Leader	None	William Irvine
Party	Alberta Non-Partisan League	Labor Representation
Leader since	n/a	1917
Leader's seat	n/a	ran in South Calgary
Last election	pre-creation	pre-creation
Seats before	n/a	0
Seats won	2	1
Seat change	▲2	▲1
Popular vote	2,700	3,576
Percentage	3%	3.17%
Swing	n/a	▲3.2
Premier before election
Arthur Sifton
Liberal
Premier after election
Arthur Sifton
Liberal

The 1917 Alberta general election was held on 7 June 1917 to elect members of the Legislative Assembly of Alberta. The Liberals won a fourth term in office, defeating most of the candidates of the Conservative Party, led by Edward Michener, Socialist, Non-Partisan League and Labour slates. The Liberals also secured several seats due to their members being on active service in World War I. The Legislature elected in this election was the last one, as of 2025, where the Liberal Party held power in Alberta.

Besides the 34 Liberal MLAs, Conservatives elected 19, the farmer-based Non-Partisan League elected two (Louise McKinney and James Weir), and the Labour Representation League (an early labour party) elected one (Alex Ross in Calgary). Together they composed one of the largest oppositions in the history of the province.

Because of World War I, eleven Members of the Legislative Assembly (MLAs) were re-elected by acclamation, under Section 38 of the Election Act, which stipulated that any member of the 3rd Alberta Legislative Assembly, would be guaranteed re-election, with no contest held, if that member was engaged in war time service. Eleven MLAs (six Liberals and five Conservatives) were automatically re-elected through this clause. (None were re-elected in the next election.)

In addition, soldiers and nurses from Alberta serving in the First World War elected two MLAs in a separate election held in September. The Army MLAs were non-partisan officially. But both of the members - Robert Pearson and Roberta MacAdams - allied themselves to Labour and Non-Partisan League MLAs by showing social consciousness in regards the conditions available for returned soldiers and working families. The two Army members were elected in one contest using block voting, while each other MLA was elected through first past the post in a single-member district.

In 1917, the main issue facing the nation was conscription. In Alberta, where support for conscription was high, the incumbent Liberal government of Arthur Sifton decided to break with federal Liberal leader Wilfrid Laurier and support Conservative Prime Minister Robert Borden's efforts to form a coalition government (Union government). Thus in Alberta, both major parties supported conscription, but growing labour and farmer activism, and the entry of women into politics, both as voters and candidates, made the election exciting enough that 30,000 more votes were cast than in the previous election (although they were nothing like the high numbers that would be cast in the 1921 election).

This was the last time Liberals won an Alberta provincial election. The 1917 election stood for 106 years as the smallest seat majority held by a party in Alberta, with the combined opposition MLAs equaling 41% of the total MLAs, a mark not exceeded until 2023.

Premier Sifton resigned in October 1917 in order to serve in the federal Unionist government of Prime Minister Borden and was replaced by Charles Stewart.

This was the first election in Alberta that women (those who were British subjects or Canadian citizens more than 20 years of age who were not Treaty Indian) had the right to vote and run. Two women were elected in the legislature that year. One of these was Roberta MacAdams, elected as one of two representatives of soldiers and nurses serving in the war. The other, Louise McKinney, was elected as a candidate of the Non-Partisan League. Her election and the election of fellow NPL candidate James Weir were harbingers of the rise of farmer politics that would see the election of the UFA government in 1921.

The Alberta Labor Representation League, which opposed conscription, elected one member in Calgary, Alex Ross.

The vote in the Athabasca district was conducted on 27 June 1917 due to the remoteness of the riding.

== Electoral system ==
All but two of the MLAs elected in this election were elected through first past the post. Alberta elections had used multiple-member districts in Edmonton and Calgary previously, but for this election they had been split into single-member districts.

The two overseas army members were elected through plurality block voting.

== Results ==
Party	Party Leader	# of candidates	Seats			Popular Vote		
Party	Party Leader	# of candidates	1913	Elected	% Change	#	% (Note: Percentage based on votes cast in Alberta districts, excluding the overseas army vote. No vote was held in 11 districts where the sitting member was re-elected without contest.)	% Change
Liberal	Arthur Sifton	49	38/39 (Note: Charles Cross represented two ridings during the previous legislative assembly.)	34	−12.8%	54,212	48.14%	−1.09%
Conservative	Edward Michener	48	17	19	+11.8%	47,055	41.79%	−3.31%
Non-Partisan League	None	5		2		2700	2%	
Labor Representation	William Irvine	2		1		3,576	3.17%	
Socialist	Charles M. O'Brien	3	-	-	-	784	0.70%	−1.17%
Independent		9	-	0		4000	4%	+2.08%
Sub-total		114	55/56	56	-	96,985	100%	
Soldiers' vote (Province at large)		2		2		8,000	30%	
Soldiers' vote (Province at large)		19		0		17,000	70%	
Total		135	55/56	58	+3.6%	125,898		
Source: Elections Alberta

Notes

Popular vote
Liberal	48.14%
Conservative	41.79%
Labor Rep.	3.17%
NPL	2.00%
Others	4.90%

Popular vote
Liberal	58.62%
Conservative	32.76%
NPL	3.45%
Labor Rep.	1.72%
Others	3.45%

== Members of the Legislative Assembly ==
For complete electoral history, see individual districts

Electoral district	Candidates			Incumbent
Electoral district	Liberal	Conservative	Other	Incumbent
Acadia	John A. McColl; 1,842; 48.22%	E. Gordon Jonah; 1,229; 32.17%	Lorne Proudfoot; 749; 19.61%	John A. McColl
Alexandra		James R. Lowery; Re-elected under the Election Act due to military service		James R. Lowery
Athabasca	Alexander Grant MacKay; 752; 65.79%	Alfred F. Fugl; 391; 34.21%		Alexander Grant MacKay
Beaver River	Wilfrid Gariepy; 1,134; 64.07%	Ambrose E. Gray; 636; 35.93%		Wilfrid Gariepy
Bow Valley	Charles Richmond Mitchell; 604; 58.13%	Edmund F. Purcell; 435; 41.87%		George Lane
Centre Calgary		Thomas M.M. Tweedie; 1,273; 48.94%	Alex Ross; 1,328; 51.06%	Thomas M.M. Tweedie
North Calgary	William McCartney Davidson; 2,701; 54.72%	Samuel Bacon Hillocks; 2,235; 45.28%		Samuel Bacon Hillocks
South Calgary		Thomas H. Blow; 3,273; 48.01%	William Irvine (Labour-Rep.); 2,248; 32.98% John McNeill; 1,296; 19.01%	Thomas H. Blow
Camrose	George P. Smith; 2,258; 65.22%	Frank P. Layton; 1,204; 34.78%		George P. Smith
Cardston	Martin Woolf; 972; 56.38%	W.G. Smith; 752; 43.62%		Martin Woolf
Claresholm	William Moffat; 670; 44.40%		Louise McKinney; 839; 55.60%	William Moffat
Clearwater	Joseph E. State; 188; 64.38%	Robert Neville Frith; 104; 35.62%		Henry William McKenney
Cochrane	Charles Wellington Fisher; 630; 57.32%	H.E.G.H. Scholefield; 469; 42.68%		Charles Wellington Fisher
Coronation	Harry S. Northwood; 1,575; 46.92%	William Wallace Wilson; 1,782; 53.08%		Frank H. Whiteside
Didsbury	Henry B. Atkins; 1,394; 52.80%	Wilbur Leslie Tolton; 1,246; 47.20%		Joseph E. Stauffer
Edmonton East	Fredrick Duncan; 2,553; 37.86%	James Ramsey; 3,035; 45.00%	Joseph A. Clarke; 811; 12.03% Sydney R. Keeling (Socialist); 345; 5.12%	New District from Edmonton
Edmonton-South	Robert Blyth Douglas; 2,178; 44.10%	Herbert Howard Crawford; 2,761; 55.90%		Herbert Howard Crawford
Edmonton West	William Thomas Henry; 2,884; 43.30%	Albert Freeman Ewing; 3,776; 56.70%		New District from Edmonton
Edson	Charles Wilson Cross; 1,116; 62.91%	J.R. McIntosh; 455; 25.65%	John Reid (Socialist); 203; 11.44%	Charles Wilson Cross
Gleichen	John P. McArthur; 712; 39.96%	Fred Davis; 762; 42.76%	John W. Leedy; 308; 17.28%	John P. McArthur
Grouard	Jean Léon Côté; 688; 70.71%	Eugene Gravel; 285; 29.29%		Jean Léon Côté
Hand Hills	Robert Berry Eaton; Re-elected under the Election Act due to military service			Robert Berry Eaton
High River	Dan F. Riley; 885; 48.95%	George Douglas Stanley; 923; 51.05%		George Douglas Stanley
Innisfail	Daniel J. Morkeberg; 905; 51.33%	Frederick William Archer; 766; 43.45%	James K. Wilson; 92; 5.22%	Frederick William Archer
Lac Ste. Anne	Ralph E. Barker; 766; 48.91%	George R. Barker; 800; 51.09%		Peter Gunn
Lacombe	William Franklin Puffer; 1,333; 48.37%	Andrew Gilmour; 1,423; 51.63%		William Franklin Puffer
Leduc	Stanley G. Tobin; 1,707; 73.67%	George Currie; 610; 26.33%		Stanley G. Tobin
Lethbridge City		John S. Stewart; Re-elected under the Election Act due to military service		John S. Stewart
Little Bow	James McNaughton; 808; 77.39%			James McNaughton
Macleod	George Skelding; 728; 51.78%	Robert Patterson; 678; 48.22%		Robert Patterson
Medicine Hat		Nelson C. Spencer; Re-elected under the Election Act due to military service		Nelson C. Spencer
Nanton	John M. Glendenning; 415; 32.88%	J.T. Cooper; 408; 32.33%	James Weir; 439; 34.79%	John M. Glendenning
Okotoks	Angus McIntosh; 535; 40.50%	George Hoadley; 786; 59.50%		George Hoadley
Olds	Duncan Marshall; 1,283; 56.35%	George H. Cloakey; 994; 43.65%		Duncan Marshall
Peace River	William A. Rae; 1,994; 62.92%	D.H. Minchin; 712; 22.47%	L. Harry Adair; 463; 14.61%	Alphaeus Patterson
Pembina	Gordon MacDonald; Re-elected under the Election Act due to military service			Gordon MacDonald
Pincher Creek	Thomas Hammond; 448; 32.94%	John H.W.S. Kemmis; 496; 36.47%	J. E. Hillier (Non-partisan); 416; 30.59%	John H.W.S. Kemmis
Ponoka	William A. Campbell; 857; 49.11%	Charles Orin Cunningham; 888; 50.89%		William A. Campbell
Red Deer	Robert B. Welliver; 1,272; 44.87%	Edward Michener; 1,295; 45.68%	George Paton; 268; 9.45%	Edward Michener
Redcliff	Charles S. Pingle; Re-elected under the Election Act due to military service			Charles S. Pingle
Ribstone	James Gray Turgeon; Re-elected under the Election Act due to military service			James Gray Turgeon
Rocky Mountain		Robert E. Campbell; Re-elected under the Election Act due to military service		Robert E. Campbell
Sedgewick	Charles Stewart; 1,657; 63.05%	John Reeve Lavell; 971; 36.95%		Charles Stewart
St. Albert	Lucien Boudreau; 1,095; 59.61%	Hector L. Landry; 742; 40.39%		Lucien Boudreau
St. Paul	Prosper-Edmond Lessard; 1,077; 66.65%	James Brady; 539; 33.35%		Prosper-Edmond Lessard
Stettler	Edward H. Prudden; 1,408; 39.45%	George McMorris; 1,375; 38.53%	J.R. Knight; 786; 22.02%	Robert L. Shaw
Stony Plain	Frank A. Smith; 705; 48.65%	Frederick W. Lundy; 744; 51.35%		Conrad Weidenhammer
Sturgeon	John Robert Boyle; 1,546; 47.19%	James Sutherland; 1,212; 37.00%	H. Mickleson; 518; 15.81%	John Robert Boyle
Taber	Archibald J. McLean; 1,804; 63.75%	Thomas O. King; 1,026; 36.25%		Archibald J. McLean
Vegreville	Joseph S. McCallum; 1,864; 59.12%	Malcolm R. Gordon; 1,289; 40.88%		Joseph S. McCallum
Vermilion	Arthur L. Sifton; 2,063; 63.03%	John B. Burch; 1,210; 36.97%		Arthur L. Sifton
Victoria	Francis A. Walker; Re-elected under the Election Act due to military service			Francis A. Walker
Wainwright		George LeRoy Hudson; Re-elected under the Election Act due to military service		George LeRoy Hudson
Warner	Frank S. Leffingwell; 706; 64.89%	Hy. James Tennant; 382; 35.11%		Frank S. Leffingwell
Wetaskiwin	Hugh John Montgomery; 1,500; 68.71%	Robert MacLachlan Angus; 683; 31.29%		Charles H. Olin
Whitford	Andrew S. Shandro; Re-elected under the Election Act due to military service			Andrew S. Shandro

=== Members re-elected under Section 38 of the Election Act ===
Eleven Liberal and Conservative MLAs serving in the army were allowed to retain their seats without election.

District	Member	Party
Alexandra	James Lowery	Conservative
Hand Hills	Robert Eaton	Liberal
Lethbridge City	John Smith Stewart	Conservative
Medicine Hat	Nelson Spencer	Conservative
Pembina	Gordon MacDonald	Liberal
Redcliff	Charles Pingle	Liberal
Ribstone	James Gray Turgeon	Liberal
Rocky Mountain	Robert Campbell	Conservative
Victoria	Francis A. Walker	Liberal
Wainwright	George LeRoy Hudson	Conservative
Whitford	Andrew Shandro	Liberal

== 1917 soldiers' and nurses' vote ==
Two extra seats were added for this election. Two MLAs were elected to represent the soldiers and nurses serving overseas. They were elected through plurality block voting, with each soldier and nurse having two votes. Roberta MacAdams, the sole woman in the race, capitalized on the two-vote system by instructing the soldiers to "give one vote to the man of your choice and the other vote to the Sister" (herself). She was successful, becoming the second woman elected in Alberta and in the whole of the British Empire.

Candidates and voters were Albertans who were enlisted for overseas military, naval or nursing service. Records show that 13,286 soldiers and nurses voted, casting almost 26,000 votes.

After the election, the MLAs sat on the opposition benches. They were non-partisan officially, although both Robert Pearson and Roberta MacAdams allied themselves to Labour and NPL MLAs by showing social consciousness in regards the conditions available for returned soldiers and working families.

The vote was held on 18 September 1917.

Military Rank	Member	Votes	%
Captain	Robert Pearson	4,286	%
Lieutenant	Roberta MacAdams	4,023	%
Private	G.E. Harper	3,328	%
Lieutenant Colonel	James Cornwall	2,331	%
Lieutenant Colonel	I.F. Page	1,782	%
Lieutenant Colonel	W.H. Hewgill	1,744	%
Private	T.A.P. Frost	1,145	%
Major	James Walker	1,109	%
Lieutenant Colonel	J.W.H. McKinnery	918	%
Lieutenant Colonel	P.E. Bowen	882	%
Private	Herbert Stow	716	%
Lieutenant	Charles Taylor	519	%
Captain	W.D. Ferris	474	%
Captain	A.M. Calderon	438	%
Lieutenant Colonel	A.M. Jarvis	425	%
Captain	Lionel Asquith	423	%
Captain	D.W. Grey	374	%
Company Sergeant Major	H.L. Bateson	221	%
Lieutenant Colonel	A.E. Myatt	186	%
Order Room Sergeant	A. Joyce	180	%
Acting Staff Sergeant	C.M. Camroux	97	%
Total Votes		25,601	100%

== See also ==
- List of Alberta political parties
- Women in Canadian politics
