= William Puffer =

Canadian politician (1861–1948)

William Franklin Puffer
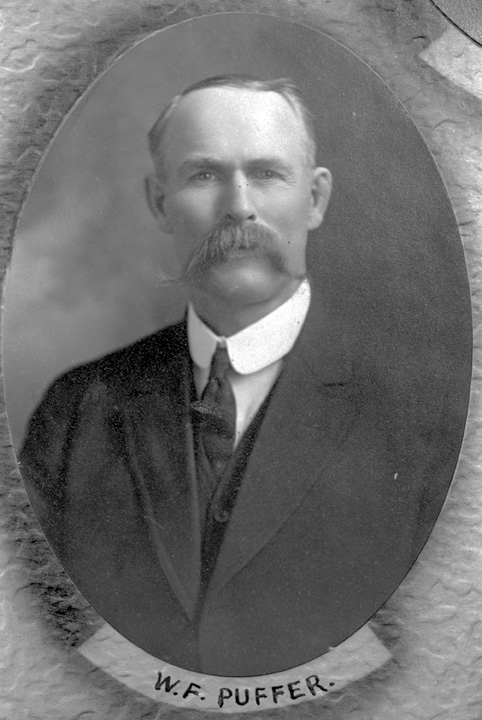

Member of the Legislative Assembly of Alberta
- In office November 2, 1905 – June 7, 1917
- Preceded by: New district
- Succeeded by: Andrew Gilmour
- Constituency: Lacombe

Personal details
- Born: November 1, 1861 North Crosby, Canada West
- Died: April 22, 1948 (aged 86) Lacombe, Alberta
- Party: Liberal
- Spouse: Charlotte Ann Gilmore
- Children: Seven
- Occupation: Rancher, lumberman

William Franklin Puffer (November 1, 1861 – April 22, 1948) was a Canadian politician who served in the Legislative Assembly of Alberta from 1905 until 1917. Born in Ontario, he came west and settled in Lacombe, where he operated a butchery, among other interests. He was elected to the legislature in Alberta's first provincial election, and returned to office in each of the next two before being defeated in the 1917 election. He subsequently made two unsuccessful attempts to reclaim his seat.

== Early life ==
Born in North Crosby, Canada West, on November 1, 1861, Puffer was the son of a United Empire Loyalist. He married Charlotte Ann Gilmore, with whom he would have seven children, on July 1, 1885. They came west in 1889 and homesteaded near Olds, before finally settling in Lacombe in 1893. Puffer was engaged in several businesses, dealing in cattle, lumber, dairy products, and farm implements. In 1900, he established a butchery in Lacombe next to a laundry operated by Hop Chung, a Chinese immigrant. When Chung wished to bring his wife and children over from China but could not afford the Can$500 head tax, Puffer paid it; Chung's family arrived in Lacombe in 1908, making his wife one of the first Chinese women in Alberta. In 1911 both Puffer's butchery and Chung's laundry burnt down, and they rebuilt a single building to share.

Besides his friendship with Chung, Puffer spoke fluent Cree and took what was then the unusual step of employing First Nations people.

== Political career ==
Puffer was active in local politics: he sat on the school board from 1893 to 1894 and from 1896 to 1902, and on the town council from 1903 to 1906. He entered the wider sphere of politics in 1904, when he was nominated as the Northwest Territories Liberal Party's candidate in the by-election to replace Peter Talbot as Lacombe's representative in the Legislative Assembly of the Northwest Territories.

The by-election was pre-empted by the 1905 creation of the province of Alberta, and Puffer instead sought election as the provincial Liberal candidate in the new provincial district of Lacombe in the 1905 provincial election. He defeated Conservative candidate Andrew Gilmour. He was acclaimed in his first re-election bid, in the 1909 election, and defeated his Conservative challenger by an increased margin in the 1913 election.

When the Alberta and Great Waterways Railway (A&GWR) scandal divided the Liberal caucus, Puffer remained loyal to the government of Premier Alexander Cameron Rutherford. When Rutherford's government fell and was replaced with that of fellow Liberal Arthur Sifton, Puffer joined Rutherford and his allies in voting against the new administration on its 1910 plan to confiscate the money raised by the A&GWR from a provincially guaranteed bond issue (on the grounds that it had defaulted on its obligations). However, he did not join Rutherford in supporting a 1913 Conservative motion of non-confidence against the government, which decried Sifton's handling of the A&GWR issue; instead, Puffer read a statement on behalf of several representatives saying that, while Rutherford's concerns were legitimate, it was premature to pass final judgment until the Judicial Committee of the Privy Council had ruled on the legality of the government's plan.

The 1917 election saw a rematch of the 1905 contest between Puffer and Gilmour; this time, Gilmour emerged victorious by a 90-vote margin. Puffer attempted to return to the legislature in the 1921 and 1926 contests, but both times was defeated by Irene Parlby, cabinet minister in the new United Farmers of Alberta government.

When the Conscription Crisis of 1917 divided the Liberal Party, Puffer became a Laurier Liberal, opposed to conscription and Conservative Prime Minister Robert Laird Borden's Union government. The incumbent Member of Parliament for Red Deer, Michael Clark, had been elected as a Liberal but joined the Unionists over conscription; Puffer challenged him in the 1917 election, but was soundly defeated. It is a measure of the campaign's acrimony that the pro-Union Calgary Herald called Puffer a "petty provincial politician and personal henchman of the Hon. Charles Cross" (Cross was the de facto leader of the Laurier Liberals in Alberta).

William Puffer died in Lacombe in 1948.

== Electoral record ==
=== Federal ===
1917 Canadian federal election results (Red Deer)		Turnout N.A.	
Union	Michael Clark	6,213	57.99%
Laurier Liberal	William Franklin Puffer	3,800	35.47%
Labour	Joseph Knight	701	6.54%

=== Provincial ===
1905 Alberta general election: Lacombe
Party	Candidate	Votes	%	±%
Liberal	William F. Puffer	612	52.80%	–
Conservative	Andrew Gilmour	547	47.20%	–
Total		1,159	–	–
Rejected, spoiled and declined		N/A	–	–
Eligible electors / turnout		N/A	N/A	–
Liberal pickup new district.				
Source(s) Source: "Lacombe Official Results 1905 Alberta general election". Alberta Heritage Community Foundation.

1909 Alberta general election: Lacombe
Party	Candidate	Votes	%	±%
Liberal	William F. Puffer	Acclaimed	–	–
Total		N/A	–	–
Rejected, spoiled and declined		N/A	–	–
Eligible electors / turnout		N/A	N/A	–
Liberal hold		Swing		N/A
Source(s) Source: "Lacombe Official Results 1909 Alberta general election". Alberta Heritage Community Foundation.

1913 Alberta general election: Lacombe
Party	Candidate	Votes	%	±%
Liberal	William F. Puffer	878	58.46%	–
Conservative	Angus MacDonald	624	41.54%	–
Total		1,502	–	–
Rejected, spoiled and declined		N/A	–	–
Eligible electors / turnout		2,029	74.03%	–
Liberal hold		Swing		N/A
Source(s) Source: "Lacombe Official Results 1913 Alberta general election". Alberta Heritage Community Foundation.

1917 Alberta general election: Lacombe
Party	Candidate	Votes	%	±%
Conservative	Andrew Gilmour	1,423	51.63%	10.09%
Liberal	William F. Puffer	1,333	48.37%	-10.09%
Total		2,756	–	–
Rejected, spoiled and declined		N/A	–	–
Eligible electors / turnout		3,530	78.07%	4.05%
Conservative gain from Liberal		Swing		-6.82%
Source(s) Source: "Lacombe Official Results 1917 Alberta general election". Alberta Heritage Community Foundation.

1921 Alberta general election: Lacombe
Party	Candidate	Votes	%	±%
United Farmers	Irene Parlby	2,113	57.86%	–
Liberal	William F. Puffer	1,539	42.14%	-6.23%
Total		3,652	–	–
Rejected, spoiled and declined		N/A	–	–
Eligible electors / turnout		4,457	81.94%	3.86%
United Farmers gain from Conservative		Swing		6.23%
Source(s) Source: "Lacombe Official Results 1921 Alberta general election". Alberta Heritage Community Foundation.

1926 Alberta general election: Lacombe
Party	Candidate	Votes	%	±%
United Farmers	Irene Parlby	1,891	53.58%	-4.27%
Liberal	William F. Puffer	1,162	32.93%	-9.21%
Conservative	P. W. Pratt	476	13.49%	–
Total		3,529	–	–
Rejected, spoiled and declined		209	–	–
Eligible electors / turnout		5,008	74.64%	-7.30%
United Farmers hold		Swing		2.47%
Source(s) Source: "Lacombe Official Results 1926 Alberta general election". Alberta Heritage Community Foundation.
