= Alphaeus Patterson =

Canadian politician

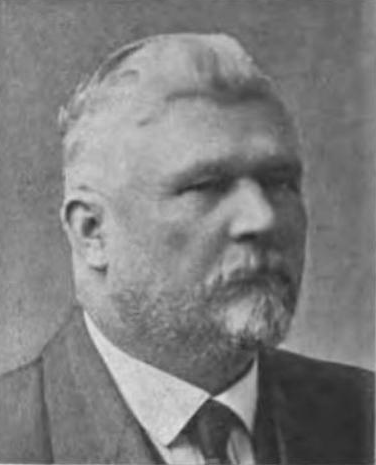

Member of the Legislative Assembly of Alberta
- In office 1913–1917
- Constituency: Peace River

Personal details
- Born: March 15, 1856 Kemptville, Canada West
- Died: November 4, 1931 (aged 75) North Saanich, British Columbia
- Party: Progressive Conservative
- Occupation: Businessman, politician

Alphaeus Patterson (March 15, 1856 – November 4, 1931) was an Irish-Canadian politician and businessman in Alberta, Canada. He was born in Kempville, Canada West.

== Business ==
Patterson founded a company with William Rae known as The Argonaut Company Ltd. In 1909 Patterson became President and Rae became the secretary-treasure. The company was primarily responsible for developing the site on Bear Creek that became modern Grande Prairie.

In 1911, Patterson erected the first Store building in Grande Prairie. The business was known as Paterson & Son. He ran the store and a post office from the same building with his son, Jack Orlando Patterson.

== Politics ==
Patterson was elected to the Alberta Legislature in the 1913 Alberta general election. He ran in a hotly three-way contested race defeating former Member of the Legislative Assembly (MLA), William Bredin, and against his former business partner and future MLA,William Rae. He served one term in the Assembly as a member of the official opposition and did not run for re-election.

Patterson is the first member elected to the Alberta Legislature who lived in Grande Prairie, Alberta. He died in 1931 in North Saanich, British Columbia.

== Honours ==
Imperial Order Daughters of the Empire - Alphaeus Patterson chapter which operated in Grande Prairie from 1921 to 1997 was named in his honour.

Grande Prairie College grants the I.O.D.E. Alphaeus Patterson Chapter Science Scholarship.

Legislative Assembly of Alberta
Preceded by James Cornwall	MLA Peace River; 1913–1917	Succeeded by William Archibald Rae
