= William Johnston (Canadian politician) =

Canadian politician

William George Johnston
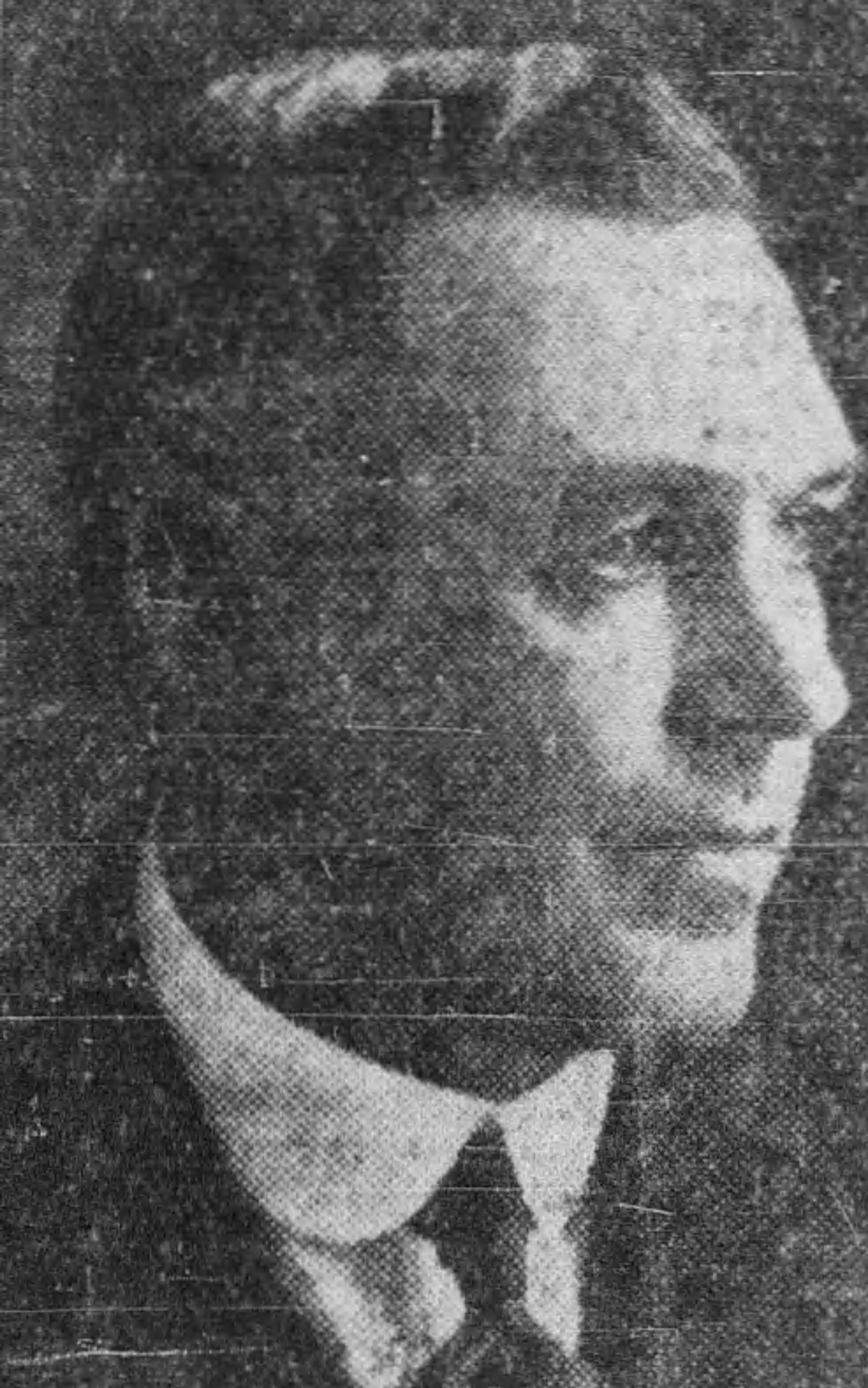

Member of the Legislative Assembly of Alberta
- In office 1921–1925 Serving with Perren Baker
- Preceded by: Nelson Spenser
- Succeeded by: Charles Pingle
- Constituency: Medicine Hat

Personal details
- Born: January 23, 1876 Owen Sound, Ontario
- Died: June 6, 1925 (aged 49) Medicine Hat, Alberta
- Party: Dominion Labor
- Spouse: Alice (m. 1900)
- Occupation: Locomotive Engineer

William George Johnston (January 23, 1876 – June 6, 1925) was a Canadian provincial level politician from Alberta, Canada. He served as a member of the Legislative Assembly of Alberta sitting with the Dominion Labor Party caucus from 1921 to his death in 1925.

== Early life ==
Johnston was born at Owen Sound, Ontario on January 23, 1876 to James A. Johnston and Helen A. Clark, both of Scottish descent. He was educated at public schools on Grey County, Ontario. Upon his arrival to the district of Woolchester, Alberta in 1900, he found employment with the Canadian Pacific Railway as a driver of passenger trains. He had also, a number of times, served a representative of the Brotherhood of Locomotive Engineers and Trainmen.

== Political career and death ==
Johnston ran for a seat to the Alberta Legislature in the two-member electoral district of Medicine Hat as the candidate for the Dominion Labor party in the 1921 Alberta general election. He came in second behind the United Farmers candidate Perren Baker, both very popular compared to their two Liberal opponents.

While attending the Legislative session in the spring of 1925, Johnston fell ill, complaining of heart problems and returned to his home where he became bedridden. He died soon after of the illness in the evening of June 6, 1925.

His funeral, "one of the largest ever held in Medicine Hat" at the time, was attended by many members of the UFA cabinet and fellow MLAs. A death notice published several weeks after his death proclaimed him "one of the most popular members of the house."

A United Farmers of Alberta publication, published shortly after his death referred to Johnston as one of the more popular members, and stated that he was as "well known in the rural parts of his constituency as he was in the city, and in the Legislative Assembly, he was an effective and able spokesman of his farmer constituents."
