= Ethel, Ontario =

Hamlet in northern Huron County, Ontario, Canada

Coordinates: 43.722343°N 81.138690°W

Ethel is a hamlet located in northern Huron County, Ontario, Canada. It has a population of nearly two hundred. It is in the municipality of Huron East in the Grey Ward, formerly Grey Township. Ethel is home to the Grey Township Fire Department, the Ethel Community Hall, the former Ethel United Church, Ethel Mennonite Church, the Ethel Ball Park and North Woods Elementary School.

North Woods Elementary School (formerly Grey Central Public School) is located just to the south of Ethel and educates students from junior kindergarten to grade six. North Woods property includes extensive Environmental Learning Grounds, which includes a beaver dam, trails, and a butterfly garden. The school falls under the jurisdiction of the Avon Maitland District School Board.
