= Frederick Lundy =

Canadian politician (1878–1928)

Frederick William Lundy
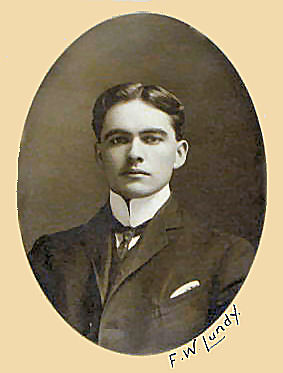
- Lundy in a 1905 Osgoode Hall Law School class composite photograph.

Member of the Legislative Assembly of Alberta
- In office June 7, 1917 – July 18, 1921
- Preceded by: Conrad Weidenhammer
- Succeeded by: Willard Washburn
- Constituency: Stony Plain

Personal details
- Born: November 10, 1878
- Died: November 17, 1928 (aged 50)
- Party: Conservative
- Occupation: lawyer

Frederick William Lundy (November 10, 1878 – November 17, 1928) was a lawyer and provincial level politician from Alberta, Canada. He served as a member of the Legislative Assembly of Alberta from 1917 to 1921 sitting with the opposition Conservative caucus.

== Political career ==
Lundy ran for a seat to the Alberta Legislature in the 1917 Alberta general election in the electoral district of Stony Plain. He defeated Liberal candidate F.A. Smith in a straight fight to hold the district for the Conservative party.

Lundy ran for a second term in office in the 1921 Alberta general election. He was defeated by United Farmers candidate Willard Washburn finishing a distant third place in the field of four candidates. Lundy lost almost 40% of his popular vote from the 1917 general election.

Lundy would attempt to win his seat back once more by running against Washburn in the 1926 Alberta general election. He slightly increased his popular vote forcing the election to go to a second count but was unable to make any gains on the transferred ballots.
