= William Archibald Rae =

Canadian politician and businessman

Member of the Legislative Assembly of Alberta
- In office June 7, 1917 – July 18, 1921
- Preceded by: Alphaeus Patterson
- Succeeded by: Donald MacBeth Kennedy
- Constituency: Peace River

Personal details
- Born: April 3, 1875 Thedford, Ontario
- Died: April 5, 1943 (aged 68)
- Party: Alberta Liberal Party

William Archibald Rae (May 3, 1875 – May 5, 1943) was a businessman and provincial level politician from Alberta, Canada. He was born in Thedford, Ontario.

== Argonaut Company ==
Rae was instrumental in the founding of Grande Prairie, Alberta with his work as secretary-treasure in The Argonaut Company Ltd. The company bought and subdivided land that became the city. He founded the company with his business partner Alphaeus Patterson.

== Political career ==
Rae ran for a seat in the Alberta Legislature for the first time in the 1913 Alberta general election. He was defeated by his former business partner Alphaeus Patterson in a closely contested three-way race. Patterson retired at the end of his term and Rae ran for the second time in the 1917 Alberta general election, this time winning the Peace River district by a large margin. He served one term in office before being defeated by Donald Kennedy, a candidate from the United Farmers of Alberta in the 1921 Alberta general election.

Rae and Kennedy faced each other in the 1925 Canadian federal election in the federal Peace River district. Rae was defeated in a very close three-way contest, finishing just 42 votes behind Kennedy.

Legislative Assembly of Alberta
Preceded by Alphaeus Patterson	MLA Peace River; 1917–1921	Succeeded by Donald MacBeth Kennedy
