= Roberta MacAdams =

Canadian politician (1880–1959)

Roberta Catherine MacAdams Price
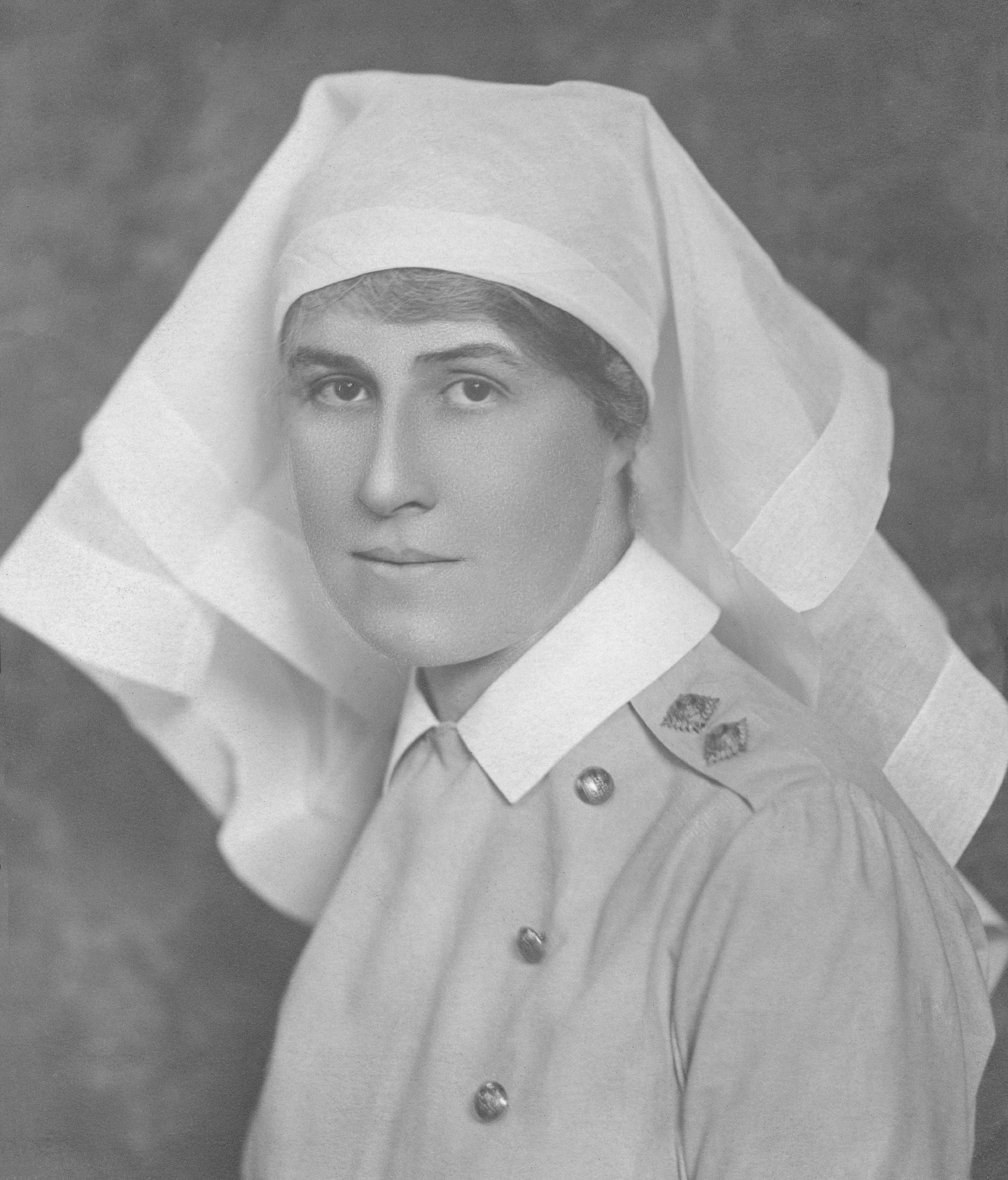
- MacAdams in 1917.

Member of the Legislative Assembly of Alberta
- In office 1917–1921

Personal details
- Born: Roberta Catherine MacAdams; July 21, 1880 Sarnia, Ontario
- Died: December 16, 1959 (aged 79) Calgary, Alberta
- Occupation: home economics instructor, dietitian, politician

Lt. Roberta Catherine Price née MacAdams (July 21, 1880 – December 16, 1959) was a provincial level politician and military dietitian from Alberta, Canada. She was elected to one of the two seats Alberta had for serving military personnel during WWI. She was the second woman elected to a legislative body in the British Empire and the first to introduce and pass a piece of legislation.

== Early life ==
MacAdams was born and raised in Sarnia, Ontario. Her father, Robert MacAdams, was the owner and editor of the Conservative newspaper Sarnia Canadian.

In 1911, MacAdams graduated from the Macdonald Institute for Domestic Science, located on the campus of the Ontario Agricultural College in Guelph. She moved to Alberta, where she worked as a domestic science instructor with the Alberta government.

She traveled around the province, speaking with rural women about their needs and teaching home economics. Her report on her findings led to the creation of the Alberta Women's Institutes, a support network for rural women. In 1912, she became the Supervisor of Household Science for the Edmonton Public school district, teaching cooking classes.

== Military career ==
In 1916, MacAdams was commissioned as a lieutenant in the Canadian Army Medical Corps, even though she was not a nurse. Her enlistment papers listed her as a "nursing sister" because she would be trained and quartered with nurses. She was appointed the staff dietitian at the Ontario Military Hospital in Orpington, England, where she oversaw the production of 3,500 meals a day for the hospital's patients and staff.

== Political career ==
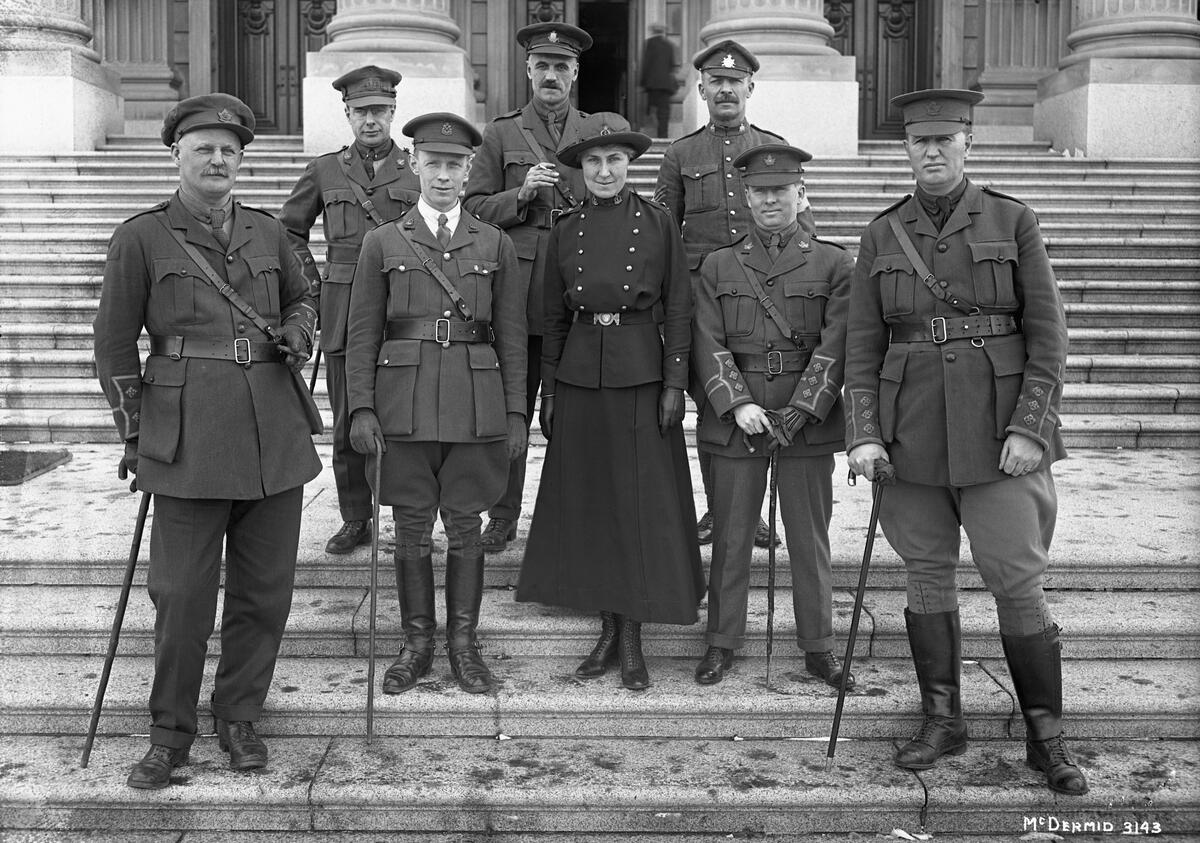
Members of the Legislative Assembly serving in the First World War in 1918. MacAdams in the middle of the front row.

In 1917, the Alberta Military Representation Act enabled the election of two at-large members of the Legislative Assembly of Alberta, to represent the soldiers and nurses from Alberta serving overseas. There were twenty male candidates running for these seats, and MacAdams was encouraged to run by war correspondent and suffragist Beatrice Nasmyth.

Nasmyth had MacAdams' campaign photos taken by leading celebrity photographer Emil Otto Hoppe. These photos showed MacAdams in a nursing sister's uniform with a white wimple, and MacAdams ran with the campaign slogan "Give one vote to the man of your choice and the other to the sister. She will work not only for your best interests, but for those of your wives, mothers, sweethearts, sisters and children after the war. Remember those who have helped you so nobly through the fight."

MacAdams was elected to the legislature as an independent, becoming the second woman elected to the Assembly, after Louise McKinney of the Nonpartisan League. Although the vote was part of the 1917 provincial general election that elected McKinney, the completion of the overseas voting and count took place at a later date than the in-province vote, making her the second woman member of the legislative assembly, and the second elected anywhere in the British Commonwealth.

MacAdams became the first woman in the British empire to introduce and successfully pass a piece of legislation, the "Act to Incorporate the Great War Next-of-Kin Association." This legally recognized a veteran's organization.

After her first legislative session, MacAdams joined the staff of the Khaki University, a university extension program for soldiers. After the war ended, she chaperoned British war brides to Canada and continued assisting these women through her work on the Alberta Soldier Settlement Board. Her work in the legislature led to the establishment of a teacher training school in Edmonton.

In 1920, MacAdams married Alberta lawyer Harvey Stinson Price. She chose not to run in the 1921 election. Instead, she moved to Calgary with her husband and son Robert, where she continued to be involved in women's and educational organizations until her death.

== Legacy ==
MacAdams' portrait was presented to the Alberta Legislature on March 16, 1967, in honor of her accomplishments.

The Roberta MacAdams School in Edmonton, Alberta, which opened on September 1, 2016, was named in her honor.

Debbie Marshall's book Give Your Other Vote to the Sister: A Woman's Journey into the Great War (University of Calgary Press, 2007) covers the life and work of MacAdams.

Legislative Assembly of Alberta
Preceded by New Position	MLA Province at Large; 1917–1921	Succeeded by Position Abolished
