= James Weir (politician) =

Canadian politician

Member of the Legislative Assembly of Alberta
- In office 7 June 1917 – 18 July 1921
- Preceded by: John M. Glendenning
- Succeeded by: Daniel Harcourt Galbraith
- Constituency: Nanton

Personal details
- Born: 5 August 1863 Elginfield, Canada West
- Died: 8 April 1949 (aged 85)
- Party: Non-Partisan League

James Weir (August 5, 1863 – April 8, 1949) was a provincial level politician from Alberta, Canada. He was one of the first elected in Alberta of the new wave of politicians, standing up for farmers and workers as a third-party representative, neither Liberal nor Conservative.

== Early life ==
He was born in Elginfield, Canada West.

A journalist by trade, he edited newspapers in Hamilton, Windsor, Saskatoon and Strathcona (now part of Edmonton).

Becoming a farmer in the Nanton area, he was active in the United Farmers of Alberta.

== Political history ==
Weir was elected to the Legislative Assembly of Alberta in the 1917 Alberta general election. In the district of Nanton, he defeated incumbent MLA John Glendenning in a hotly contested three-way race that separated first from third place by 31 votes. Weir was elected as an Independent and affiliated with the leftist Non-Partisan League.

Weir only served a single term in the assembly. He did not run for re-election after dissolution of the Legislature in 1921.

Legislative Assembly of Alberta
Preceded by John M. Glendenning	MLA Nanton; 1917–1921	Succeeded by Daniel Harcourt Galbraith
