= Charles Pingle =

Canadian politician

Charles Steuart Pingle
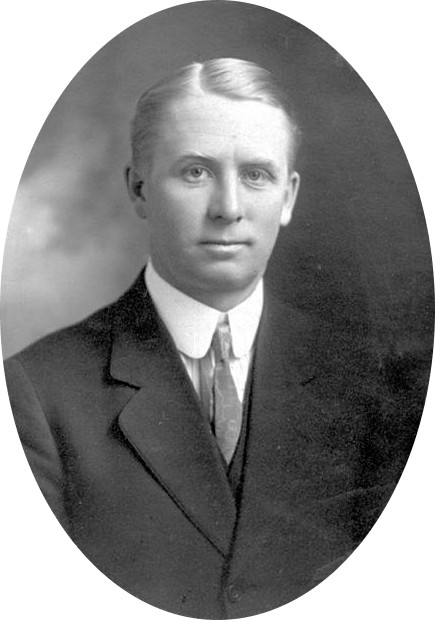

Member of the Legislative Assembly of Alberta
- In office March 25, 1913 – July 18, 1921
- Preceded by: New District
- Succeeded by: William Smith
- Constituency: Redcliff
- In office September 29, 1925 – January 19, 1928 Serving with Perren Baker
- Preceded by: William Johnston
- Succeeded by: Hector Lang
- Constituency: Medicine Hat

Speaker of the Legislative Assembly of Alberta
- In office February 17, 1920 – July 18, 1921
- Preceded by: Charles Fisher
- Succeeded by: Oran McPherson

Personal details
- Born: October 16, 1880 near Morris, Manitoba
- Died: January 10, 1928 (aged 47) Medicine Hat, Alberta
- Party: Liberal
- Spouse: Jean McLeay (m. 1903)
- Relations: David Steuart
- Children: Robert Warren; Charles Glendining (died in infancy)

Military service
- Allegiance: Canada
- Branch/service: Canadian Expeditionary Force
- Years of service: May 25, 1915–1918
- Battles/wars: World War I

Charles Stueart Pingle (October 16, 1880 – January 10, 1928) was a druggist, politician and service man in Alberta, Canada. He served in the Legislative Assembly of Alberta from 1913 to 1921 and from 1925 to 1928 as a member of the Liberal Party. He also served as Speaker of the Assembly from 1920 to 1921.

Pingle was born in Manitoba. After attending schools in Winnipeg, he apprenticed a druggist in Regina for two years before writing pharmaceutical exams and moving to Alberta to establish his own shop. One of the founding citizens of Medicine Hat, Alberta, he served in various boards and associations within the community. After serving as an alderman in Medicine Hat, in 1915, Pingle enlisted in the Canadian Expeditionary Force, and was stationed in France, where he served for about 5 months before returning to Canada.

After winning a seat as a Liberal in the 1913 Alberta general election and being returned to office again in 1917, Pingle was selected as Speaker of the Legislative Assembly of Alberta in 1920, in which he served until he was defeated in the 1921 Alberta general election by United Farmers candidate William Smith in a close race. He returned to the Assembly in a 1925 by-election in the riding of Medicine Hat, in which he served until his sudden death in 1928.

== Early life, education and career ==
Charles Steuart Pingle was born to Warren Hume and Georgina (née Steuart) Pingle near Morris, Manitoba on October 16, 1880. His father, born in what would later become Ontario, maintained a family milling business. Upon moving to Regina in 1883, Warren Pingle held many community positions, such as town assessor, jailer, and president of the school board, until his sudden death in 1889 at the age of 41.

Charles Pingle attended public school in Winnipeg and then apprenticed with the Bole Drug Company in Regina. In 1899, after apprenticing for two years, he wrote pharmaceutical exams and then entered the profession. He moved to Medicine Hat, Alberta in 1901, and one year later, purchased a drug business from Donald A. Black, naming the store Pingle Drug and Book Company. He was a member of the first council of the Alberta Pharmaceutical Association from 1911 to 1912. He later served as president of the Association from 1918 to 1919. He also served as director of various corporations, like the Medicine Hat News and the Commonwealth Trust Company in Calgary. He also maintained a farm in Medicine Hat.

== Military ==
Pingle served in the Canadian Militia as quartermaster of the 21st Alberta Hussars from 1909 to 1914, with the rank of an honorary captain. Pingle joined the Canadian Overseas Expeditionary Force to fight in World War I on May 25, 1915. He sailed to France in June 1915, serving there from September 1915 to February 1916, when he returned to Canada.

== Political career ==
From 1910 to 1912, Pingle sat as an alderman on the Medicine Hat City Council. He served on the Police Committee and Electric Committee.

Pingle served as president and vice president of the Medicine Hat Liberal Association. He first ran for to the Alberta Legislature in the 1913 Alberta general election as a candidate under the Liberal banner. He won a two-way race to pick up the new electoral district of Redcliff for his party. From 1918 to 1919, he chaired the Standing Committee on Miscellaneous and Private Bills in the Fourth Legislature.

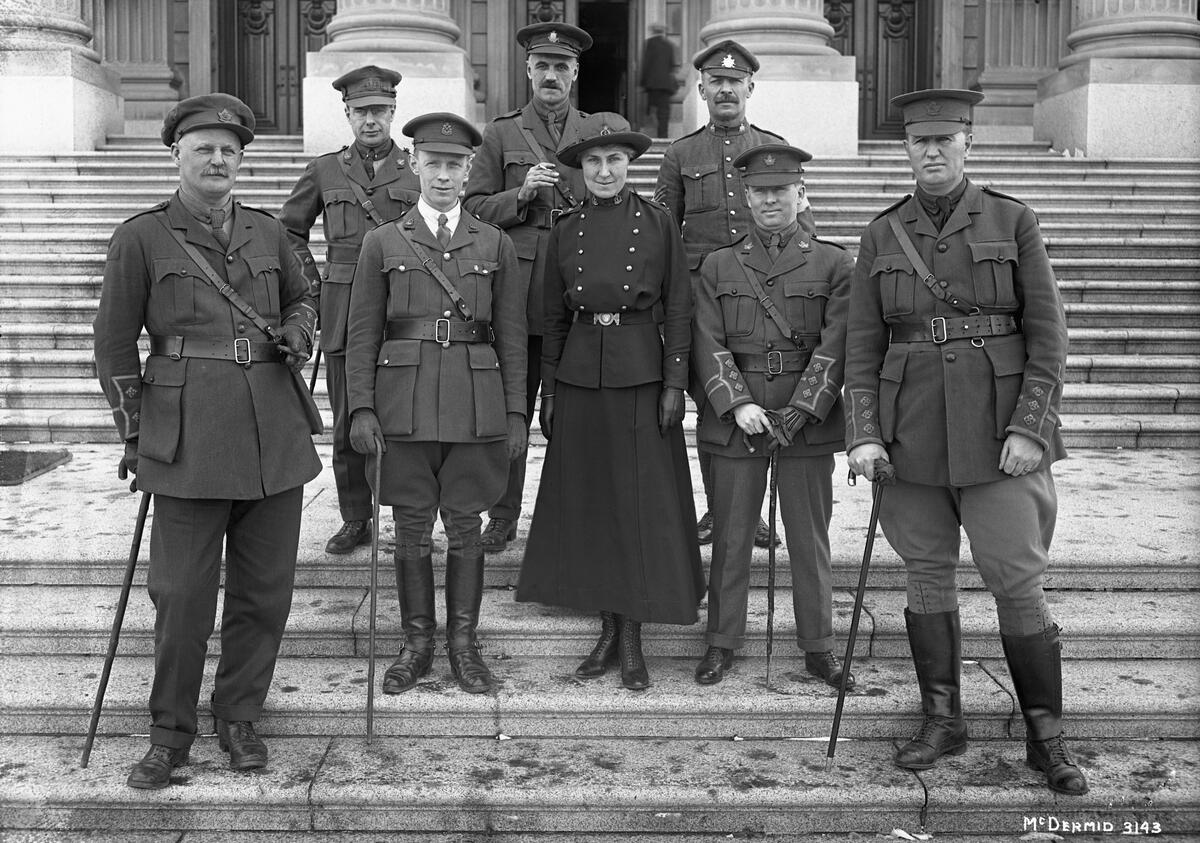
Soldier Members of the Legislative Assembly of Alberta in 1918. Pingle is in the front row, second from the right.

In the 1917 general election he was returned to office by acclamation under Section 38 of the Election Act, for MLAs who served in the war.

In 1920, following the death of incumbent Speaker Charles W. Fisher, Pingle was nominated by Premier Charles Stewart and Attorney-General John R. Boyle for Speaker of the Alberta Legislature. He took up the position on February 17 of the same year.

One of the first issues he dealt with was one involving Wilfrid Gariepy, MLA for Beaver River. This involved the fact that Gariepy, who did not reside in Alberta, appeared not to be eligible to sit in the house, in accordance with the Legislative Assembly of Alberta Act and Alberta Election Act. Although the mention was revoked, Pingle later ruled that it was not his duty to decide on the status of Gariepy, and it was only his duty to recognize every elected member of the house who had been administered the oath of office.

He ran for re-election in the 1921 general election but, contrary to many reports, was defeated in a two-way race by United Farmers candidate William Smith. He was the first Speaker in Alberta to be defeated.

Pingle made a political come back by running as a candidate in the Medicine Hat electoral district in a by-election held on September 29, 1925, following the death of incumbent William Johnston. Pingle won on the second-choice preferences of the new alternate vote system.

In the 1926 general election Pingle (and Conservative candidate J.J.Hendricks) won Medicine Hat's two seats in a three-way race held under Single transferable voting rules.

The following year, he was appointed to the Legislature's Special Committee on the Rules, Orders and Forms of Proceedings.

== Personal life ==
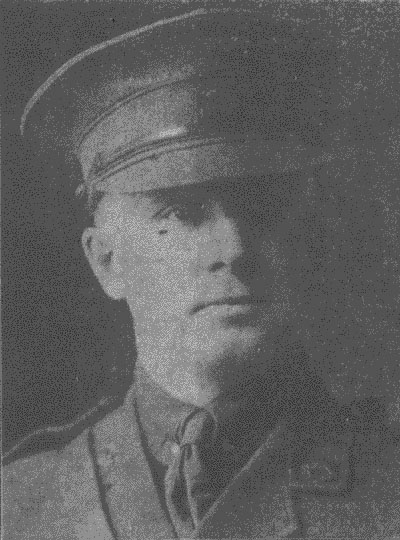
Captain Charles S. Pingle

Charles Steuart Pingle married Jean McLeay, originally from Ontario, on September 16, 1903. Her parents were both of Scottish descent, with her mother being born in Scotland. Her father worked as a money broker and manufacturer in his hometown of Watford, Ontario. Pingle and his wife had two children, Robert Warren and Charles Glendining; the latter died in infancy. Robert's son, also named Charles Steuart, was an unsuccessful Progressive Conservative candidate in the Ontario riding of Windsor-Walkerville in the 1979 and 1980 federal elections.

Pingle was greatly associated with the Medicine Hat community. He sat on many boards, including the Board of Trade, Rotary Club, and Board of Directors of the Agricultural Society. He also belonged to the Sons of England Society and Knights of Pythias. He also enjoyed baseball and curling, where he was president of the board and a skip of a team respectively. He also took an interest in music as a member of a string quartet and as president of a citizens band.

The locality of Pingle, near Fort McMurray, which was formerly an Alberta and Great Waterways railway station, was named after him in 1925. Also, a street in Medicine Hat, Pingle Street, was named in his honour.

== Death and legacy ==
Pingle attended a conference in the morning on January 10, 1928. He returned to his home shortly after noon. He felt a pricking sensation in his hand, and he was unable to use it and his wife urged him to go have a nap. Pingle died at 7:20 pm that day at his residence in Medicine Hat, of what was reported to be "cardiac troubles" or a stroke. He had been in poor health in the years preceding his death. His funeral was attended by various members of provincial and municipal governments, political associations, and communities with which he was associated. St. Barbanas Church, in which it was held, was filled to its capacity, and many people had to stand outside. He was interred at the Hillside Cemetery in Medicine Hat. His wife, Jean, was buried beside him upon her death on September 6, 1944.

Senator William Buchanan characterized him as "a fair, dignified and capable presiding officer" and called him the "first citizen of Medicine Hat". Lieutenant Governor William Egbert stated that the death of Pingle would be "keenly felt by the Members of the House and by the people of the province". In an obituary, Pingle was described as "an outstanding figure in the Medicine Hat district, where for many years he occupied an important position in the business and social life of the community."

== Bibliography ==
- Perry, Sandra E.; Footz, Valerie L. (2006). A Higher Duty : Speakers of the Legislative Assemblies of the North-West Territories and Alberta, 1888-2005. Edmonton, Alberta: Legislative Assembly of Alberta. ISBN 0-9689217-3-6.
