= Andrew Gilmour (politician) =

Canadian politician

Member of the Legislative Assembly of Alberta
- In office 1917–1921
- Preceded by: William Puffer
- Succeeded by: Irene Parlby
- Constituency: Lacombe

Personal details
- Born: March 2, 1875
- Died: July 25, 1938 (aged 63)
- Party: Conservative

Andrew Gilmour (March 2, 1875 – July 25, 1938) was a provincial level politician from Alberta, Canada. He served as a member of the Legislative Assembly of Alberta from 1917 to 1921.

== Political career ==
Gilmour first ran as a candidate for the provincial Conservative party in the 1905 Alberta general election. He ran against former Northwest Territories Member of the Legislative Assembly William Puffer to contest the Lacombe provincial electoral district. Gilmour lost by 65 votes in the two-way race, and took 47% of the popular vote.

Gilmour ran for the second time as a candidate 12 years later against Puffer in the 1917 Alberta general election. Gilmour won the district with just over 51% of the popular vote. a 90-vote difference separating them.
