= Charles Richmond Mitchell =

Canadian politician (1872–1942)

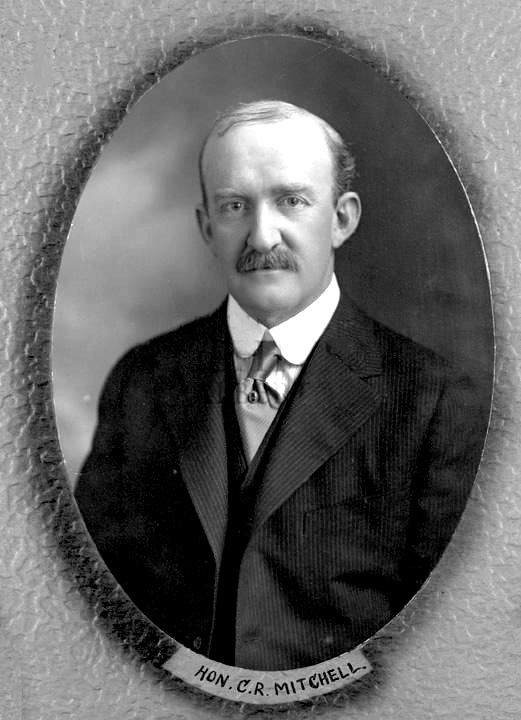

Leader of the Official Opposition in Alberta
- In office February 19, 1925 – March 12, 1926
- Preceded by: John Robert Boyle
- Succeeded by: John C. Bowen

Alberta Minister of Health
- In office April 29, 1920 – August 13, 1921
- Preceded by: Alexander Grant MacKay
- Succeeded by: Richard Gavin Reid

Alberta Minister of Municipal Affairs
- In office April 29, 1920 – August 13, 1921
- Preceded by: Alexander Grant MacKay
- Succeeded by: Richard Gavin Reid

Alberta Provincial Treasurer
- In office November 28, 1913 – August 13, 1921
- Preceded by: Arthur Sifton
- Succeeded by: Herbert Greenfield

Alberta Minister of Public Works
- In office May 4, 1912 – November 28, 1913
- Preceded by: Arthur Sifton
- Succeeded by: Charles Stewart

Alberta Minister of Education
- In office June 1, 1910 – May 4, 1912
- Preceded by: Alexander Cameron Rutherford
- Succeeded by: John Robert Boyle

Attorney-General of Alberta
- In office June 1, 1910 – May 4, 1912
- Preceded by: Charles Wilson Cross
- Succeeded by: Charles Wilson Cross

Member of the Legislative Assembly of Alberta
- In office June 12, 1913 – March 18, 1926
- Preceded by: George Lane
- Succeeded by: Joseph Tweed Shaw
- Constituency: Bow Valley
- In office June 29, 1910 – April 17, 1913
- Preceded by: William Thomas Finlay
- Succeeded by: Nelson Spencer
- Constituency: Medicine Hat

Personal details
- Born: November 20, 1872 Newcastle, New Brunswick, Canada
- Died: August 16, 1942 (aged 69) Edmonton, Alberta, Canada
- Party: Liberal
- Relations: Peter Mitchell (uncle)
- Education: University of New Brunswick; King's College
- Profession: Lawyer

Charles Richmond Mitchell (November 30, 1872 – August 16, 1942) was a Canadian lawyer, judge, cabinet minister and former Leader of the Official Opposition in the Legislative Assembly of Alberta.

== Early life ==
Mitchell was born in Newcastle, New Brunswick. At the time, the Mitchells were a prominent local family: Mitchell's father was the Sheriff of Northumberland County and his uncle was Peter Mitchell, a senator and later Premier of New Brunswick.

He went to the University of New Brunswick and King's College and took the New Brunswick bar exam in 1897. The next year he moved to Medicine Hat, at that time in the Northwest Territories, and opened a thriving legal practice. He was appointed as a Judge in 1907 for the Calgary District Court.

== Cabinet minister ==
A Liberal politician, Mitchell was first elected as a Member of the Legislative Assembly in a by-election in Medicine Hat provincial electoral district on June 29, 1910, after Premier Arthur L.W. Sifton appointed him to the cabinet on June 1.

Mitchell held two cabinet portfolios as the Minister of Education and the Attorney General of the province. He would serve both portfolios for 2 years until he became Minister of Public Works on May 4, 1912, and dropped the others. In the 1913 Alberta general election Mitchell lost his seat to Nelson Spencer from the Conservative Party. Mitchell was the only Cabinet minister defeated that election, but his was one of a few high-profile defeats across the province.

After his defeat in the 1913 general election, George Lane, the MLA for Bow Valley, resigned to provide a seat for Minister Mitchell. On June 12, 1913, he was acclaimed and again rejoined the government. He would serve Bow Valley as its MLA until his resignation in 1926.

Mitchell was reappointed to the Sifton Cabinet as the provincial Treasurer on November 28, 1913. He became the first Treasurer in Alberta history not to serve simultaneously as premier. He held that position until the United Farmers of Alberta defeated the government in 1921.

On April 29, 1920, Mitchell was appointed to be Minister of Municipal Affairs, in addition to being the Treasurer.

== Defeat of government ==
Mitchell was one of the few Liberal Party members to survive the defeat of the government in 1921. After John Robert Boyle resigned to take a judicial position on October 27, 1924, Mitchell became the fifth leader of the Liberal Party of Alberta. He would serve as Leader of the Official Opposition until he was appointed in 1926 as a Justice to the Supreme Court of Alberta Appellate Division, when he vacated his seat and position as Liberal leader. He resigned not long before the 1926 provincial election, which the UFA won with an increased majority.

He retired from the judiciary in 1936.

== Death ==
Mitchell died in 1942 in Edmonton, Alberta.

== Electoral record ==
=== 1910 by-election ===
Alberta provincial by-election, June 29, 1910: Medicine Hat Upon the resignation of William T. Finlay
Party	Candidate	Votes	%	±%
Liberal	Charles Richmond Mitchell	1,134	62.86%	-8.80%
Conservative	Walter Huckvale	670	37.14%	8.80%
Total		1,804	–	–
Rejected, spoiled and declined		N/A	–	–
Eligible electors / turnout		N/A	N/A	–
Liberal hold		Swing		-8.80%
Source(s) "By-elections". elections.ab.ca. Elections Alberta.

=== 1913 general election ===
1913 Alberta general election: Medicine Hat
Party	Candidate	Votes	%	±%
Conservative	Nelson Spencer	1,843	50.27%	12.58%
Liberal	Charles Richmond Mitchell	1,823	49.73%	-12.58%
Total		3,666	–	–
Rejected, spoiled and declined		N/A	–	–
Eligible electors / turnout		N/A	N/A	–
Conservative gain from Liberal		Swing		-12.58%
Source(s) Source: "Medicine Hat Official Results 1913 Alberta general election". Alberta Heritage Community Foundation.

Alberta provincial by-election, June 12, 1913: Bow Valley
Party	Candidate	Votes
Liberal	Charles Richmond Mitchell	Acclaimed
Called due to resignation of G. Lane to provide seat
Source: "By-elections for the Period of 1905 – 1973". Elections Alberta.

1917 Alberta general election: Bow Valley
Party	Candidate	Votes	%	±%
Liberal	Charles Richmond Mitchell	604	58.13%	-3.65%
Conservative	Edmund F. Purcell	435	41.87%	3.65%
Total		1,039	–	–
Rejected, spoiled and declined		N/A	–	–
Eligible electors / turnout		1,466	70.87%	11.58%
Liberal hold		Swing		-3.65%
Source(s) Source: "Bow Valley Official Results 1917 Alberta general election". Alberta Heritage Community Foundation.

1921 Alberta general election: Bow Valley
Party	Candidate	Votes	%	±%
Liberal	Charles Richmond Mitchell	1,694	72.30%	14.17%
United Farmers	George A. Love	649	27.70%	–
Total		2,343	–	–
Rejected, spoiled and declined		N/A	–	–
Eligible electors / turnout		2,669	N/A	N/A
Liberal hold		Swing		14.17%
Source(s) Source: "Bow Valley Official Results 1921 Alberta general election". Alberta Heritage Community Foundation.
