= Alberta Non-Partisan League =

- Former provincial party
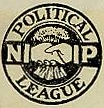
- Founded: 1916
- Dissolved: July 15, 1919
- Merged into: United Farmers of Alberta
- Headquarters: 204-205 Leeson & Lineham Block; Calgary, Alberta
- Ideology: Populism; Collectivism
- Colours: Red

The Alberta Non-Partisan League was a minor provincial political party in Alberta, Canada. It elected two MLAs in 1917 and helped lead the United Farmers of Alberta into direct politics prior to the 1921 Alberta general election. The League changed its name in 1917 to the Non-Partisan Political League of Canada: Alberta Branch as it prepared to move into federal politics, and then changed its name again to the Farmers Non-Partisan Political League.

The Alberta group took inspiration from the success of the Nonpartisan League in North Dakota, which took control of the state Republican Party in 1916 and in 1918 elected majorities in both the state House of Representatives and the State Senate. The Alberta NPL was formed to promote the interests of farmers in the political arena. Many farmers said the Liberal and Conservative parties, federal and provincial, were not serving their interests. Supporters of the Non-Partisan League conducted meetings across rural Alberta. The NPL was socialist in inclination under the influence of Calgary minister and author William Irvine, later a Labour MP. William Irvine was editor of The Alberta Non-Partisan newspaper, published in Calgary, from October 1917 to September 1919. This was the successor to Irvine's previous political newspaper, Nutcracker, and was succeeded in turn by the Western Independent.

In the 1917 provincial election, four League members stood as candidates: Louise McKinney (later a member of the Famous Five) in Claresholm, James Weir in Nanton, J.E. Hillier in Pincher Creek and former Kansas governor John W. Leedy in Gleichen. Lorne Proudfoot and several other reform-minded candidates also ran as independent or labour candidates (through the NPL co-sponsored Labor Representation League). McKinney and Weir were elected to sit in the legislature in 1917. McKinney was one of the first two women to sit in the Alberta Legislature, who were also the first women elected to a legislature in all of the British Commonwealth. Hillier finished third in a tight three-way race. Leedy also placed third.

The Non-Partisan League ran James Miner as a candidate in a 1917 administrative by-election in Camrose. Miner endorsed the progressive "Farmers Platform" that had just previously been issued by the Canadian Council of Agriculture. He got more than a 1000 votes but lost in a two-way race against Liberal cabinet minister George P. Smith.

In advance of the 1917 federal election, the NPL became active in federal politics. This decision was made at a 1917 convention in Calgary, when the Non-Partisan Political League of Canada was founded. It nominated three candidates in the December 1917 federal election, all running in Alberta ridings - Daniel Gailbraith (later a UFA MLA) in Bow River, Steve Marshall in Macleod, and John W. Leedy (former governor of Kansas) in Victoria. None were elected.

In the 1917 federal election campaign, the NPL called for conscription of wealth and all national resources as well as men (this was during WWI); nationalization of all transportation, telephone and telegraph lines, steamship lines, banking and credit systems; all industries to be organized on a national scale where competition seems to cease to exist; payment of $100 a month to soldiers; government insurance for soldiers; assurances by the government of protection of soldiers' homes against loss due to mortgages and taxes; extension of the public domain to include all coal mines, water powers and forests; a federal direct legislation act including the power of recall; equal suffrage for both men and women, a graduated inheritance tax, a graduated income tax; abolition of official charity and in its place the enactment of a national compulsory insurance law covering accidents, illness, old age and death; and abolition of the Canadian Senate. The NPL also asked for free administration of justice and changes so that no court was legally able to declare as unconstitutional any act of the Canadian Parliament.

The League continued organizational efforts after the 1917 elections, gathering a sizeable campaign fund, holding town hall meetings, and increasing its membership. The League's political activities and its two MLAs pushed the United Farmers of Alberta to either enter electoral politics or face being eclipsed by the NPL. The UFA decided to launch a political arm and, in 1919, absorbed the NPL. The ground work and organization done by the League helped the UFA win a 1919 provincial by-election, a 1921 federal by-election, and the 1921 provincial election, when it was elected government of the province, taking a majority of seats in the Legislative Assembly. Former NPL MLA McKinney ran as an UFA candidate but was not elected in Claresholm in 1921. The UFA also elected every candidate it ran in the 1921 Canadian federal election.

The work of the NPL organization was recorded in the pages of the Alberta Non-Partisan, edited by William Irvine, and also in the pages of the Grain Growers Guide.

== See also ==
- List of Alberta political parties
