= James Shouldice =

Canadian politician (1850–1925)

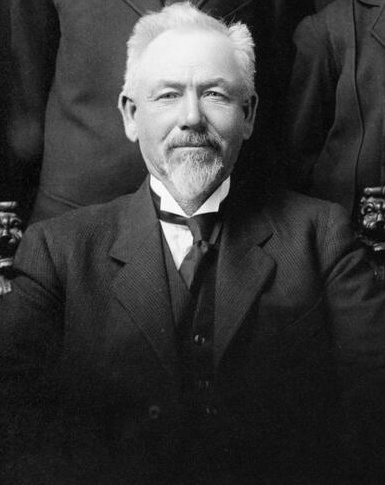
- Shouldice photographed in 1913 or 1914.
- Born: November 5, 1850
- Died: May 9, 1925 (aged 74)
- Burial place: Union Cemetery (Calgary)
- Monuments: Shouldice Park
- Occupations: Rancher, politician
- Title: Bruce County Warden
- Term: 1897
- Political party: Conservative
- Spouse: Mary Margaret Elizabeth Purdue
- Children: 11, including Dr. Earle Shouldice, founder of Shouldice Hospital

James Shouldice (November 5, 1850 – May 9, 1925) was a Canadian politician, rancher and philanthropist. He was active in Ontario politics during the first half of his life, though he is best known today for his contributions to the development of Calgary in the early twentieth century.

== Early life, occupations and marriage ==
Shouldice was born November 5, 1850 to an Irish Methodist family in Chatsworth, Ontario. His parents had emigrated during the Great Migration of Canada, a period in which Canada's colonial government encouraged British and Irish settlers to relocate to Upper Canada. In 1853, the Shouldice family relocated to Bruce County to take advantage of farmland made available to settlers by the government.

Shouldice remained in Bruce County from 1853 until 1900. In adulthood, he entered the family business of ranching, and maintained a racing stables in Toronto in the 1870s.

In 1879, he married Mary Purdue, the Quebec-born daughter of a reverend. Between 1881 and 1898, the couple had ten biological children: five sons and five daughters. James and Mary were both devout practitioners of the Methodist faith and engaged in charitable activities with the church throughout their relationship.

== Ontario politics ==
=== Municipal politics: 1892–1897 ===
In the late 1800s, municipalities that fell under the jurisdiction of Bruce County sent at least one reeve to sit on the county's council, and in some cases a deputy reeve as well. Shouldice was elected as the reeve of Elderslie between 1892 and 1896.

By the 1890s, the county government consisted of 44 councillors in total, and an act was introduced to cut membership to 18. The 44-member incarnation of the council held its last meeting in December 1896. Shouldice ended the session with a joke motion that the members should, as their last act, enter mourning and install a gravestone for the council. Shouldice returned to municipal politics in 1897 to serve a one-year term as the Warden of Bruce County.

=== Ontario provincial politics: 1898–1899 ===
In 1898, Shouldice ran unsuccessfully for the Legislative Assembly of Ontario as the Conservative candidate for Bruce Centre. He remained involved with the party, attending its 1899 December meeting and delivering a speech. By this time, however, he was experiencing poor health, culminating in the decision for he and Mary to relocate with their children to Alberta.

== Life in Alberta ==
=== Move to Namaka: 1900 ===
In 1900 Shouldice took out a five-year lease on a ranch in Namaka, Alberta, comprising 13,000 acres of land for an annual fee of $475 in contemporary dollars. James relocated to the farm first, and Mary followed with their children in early 1901. Their second-youngest son, Stanley, would later recall arriving to Alberta on a train "in the dead of night, at a railway siding 40 miles east of Calgary." The nearest school was 12 miles away in Gleichen, so Mary home-schooled the younger children for the next four years while the three eldest boarded in Gleichen to receive a formal education.

=== Move to Calgary, farming in Gleichen, and creation of the hamlet of Shouldice: 1906 ===
Over time, Mary grew concerned with acquiring better learning opportunities for the couple's children. In 1906, in order to be closer to schools, James initiated the purchase of a 480-acre farm to the west of Calgary that had originally been established by rancher and politician Oswald Critchley. The Shouldices maintained a property in Calgary that they used as a base when the children were in school, or taking piano and voice lessons.

Concurrently, Shouldice purchased an additional 1,700 acres of land near Gleichen, stretching to the border of the Blackfoot Crossing Historical Park. A small hamlet developed in the area that came to bear his name.

Shouldice operated the Gleichen farm for the rest of his life, remaining personally involved in its day-to-day operations until his death in 1925. He was one of the first Albertans to breed Hereford cattle, developing a reputation for exhibiting them at trade shows around the province. He viewed agriculture as a science, and was noted to be an early adopter of new farming machinery. Shouldice was also successful at dry farming. While the 1910s saw a period of low precipitation in the Prairies, Shouldice received press attention in 1910 for growing "splendid oats" on his lands using dryland techniques.

=== Gleichen political campaigns: 1909-1911 ===
In the 1909 provincial general election, Shouldice ran as the Conservative candidate for the electoral district of Gleichen. He lost to Liberal incumbent Ezra Riley, who received 770 votes to Shouldice's 525.

Riley resigned his seat in June 1910 to protest Arthur Sifton, who had become Premier in the wake of the Alberta and Great Waterways Railway scandal. Though the press speculated that Shouldice would run again in the ensuing October by-election, the Conservatives refrained from running a candidate, instead choosing to support Riley's re-election bid as an independent. Riley was ultimately unsuccessful, losing to Liberal candidate Archibald J. McArthur.

McArthur died just eight months later, prompting another by-election to be held in October 1911. This time, the Conservative party decided to run a candidate. Shouldice sought the nomination, though he was not the party's first choice: the nomination was first offered to Maitland Stewart McCarthy and Alexander McGillivray, who both declined. In the end, Shouldice contested the nomination against Ezra Riley's brother, Harold Riley. Party members voted in favour of nominating Harold by a majority of almost 75%. Harold received Shouldice's public endorsement ahead of ultimately winning the by-election.

== Life in Calgary ==
=== Charitable and community activities: 1906–1925 ===
Upon moving to Calgary, James and Mary Shouldice became congregants of the Methodist Central Church, which was led by Reverend Dr. George Kerby. The couple financially supported the church's charitable operations throughout the rest of their lifetimes, and the Calgary Herald reported that they donated "generously" to the local chapter of the YMCA.

=== Donation of land for Shouldice Park: 1909 ===
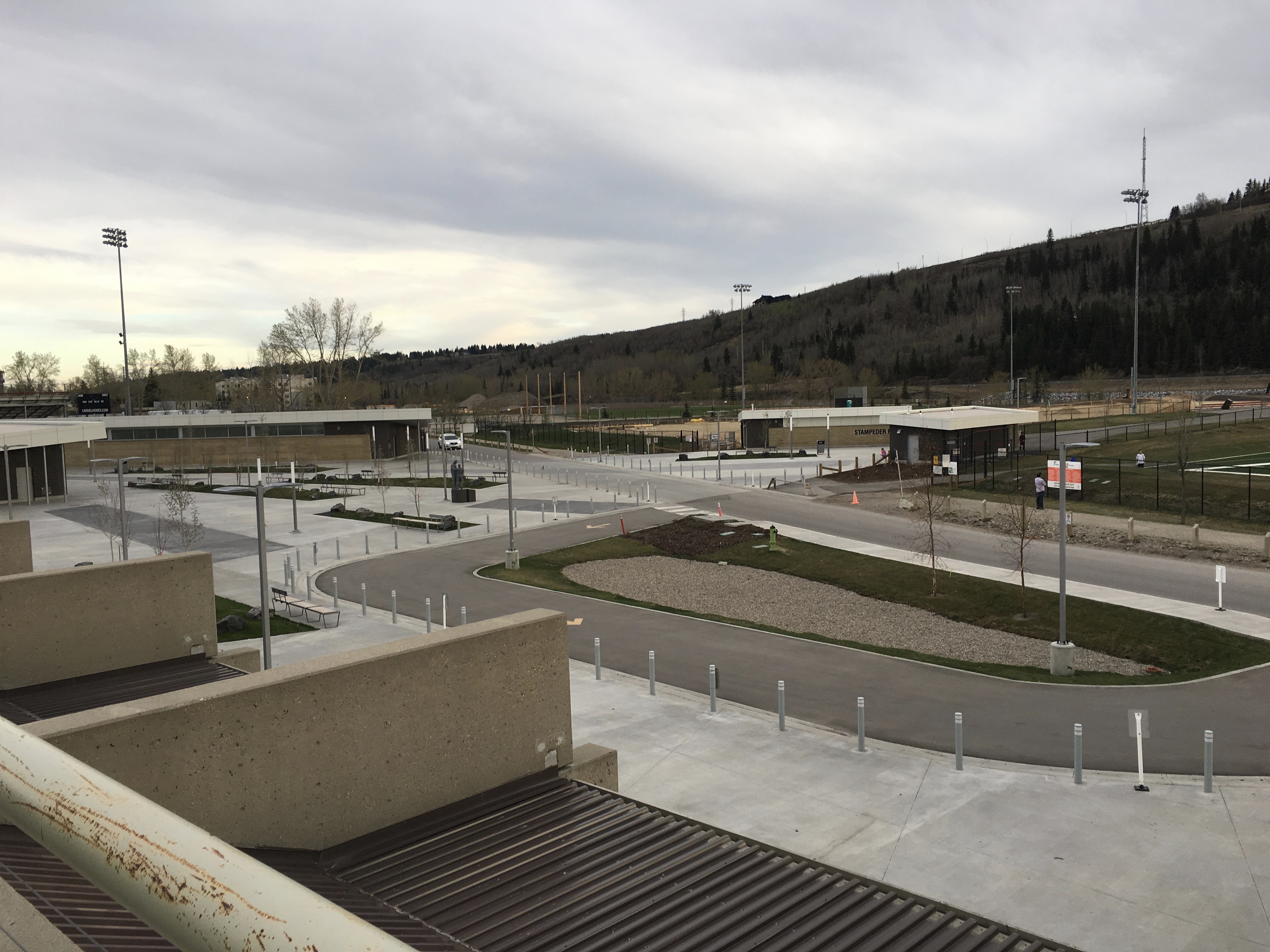
Shouldice Park, Calgary, undergoing renovations in 2017.

In 1909, Shouldice and his neighbour, Alfred Sydney McKay, donated a total of 100 acres of farmland along the Bow River to the City of Calgary. They hoped the municipality would convert it into a park for the enjoyment of its residents, stipulating that the City should install a streetcar route connecting the land to Louise Bridge.

Although the City accepted, the lot remained relatively untouched for the rest of Shouldice's life. By 1917, weeds were pervasive, and the ground had not been levelled to introduce a sports pitch as Shouldice and McKay had hoped. In January 1918, Shouldice negotiated a four-year lease of the land back from the City, to sublet plots of the park for agriculture and to level the land himself.

Nonetheless, work would not begin on introducing public amenities to what is now called Shouldice Park until forty years after Shouldice's death. Today, the park is run by the City, offering soccer, baseball, and tennis facilities across 28 hectares. The area also contains the Shouldice Aquatic Centre and Shouldice Arena, named after James.

=== Creation of Shouldice Terrace (later Montgomery): 1910–1925 ===
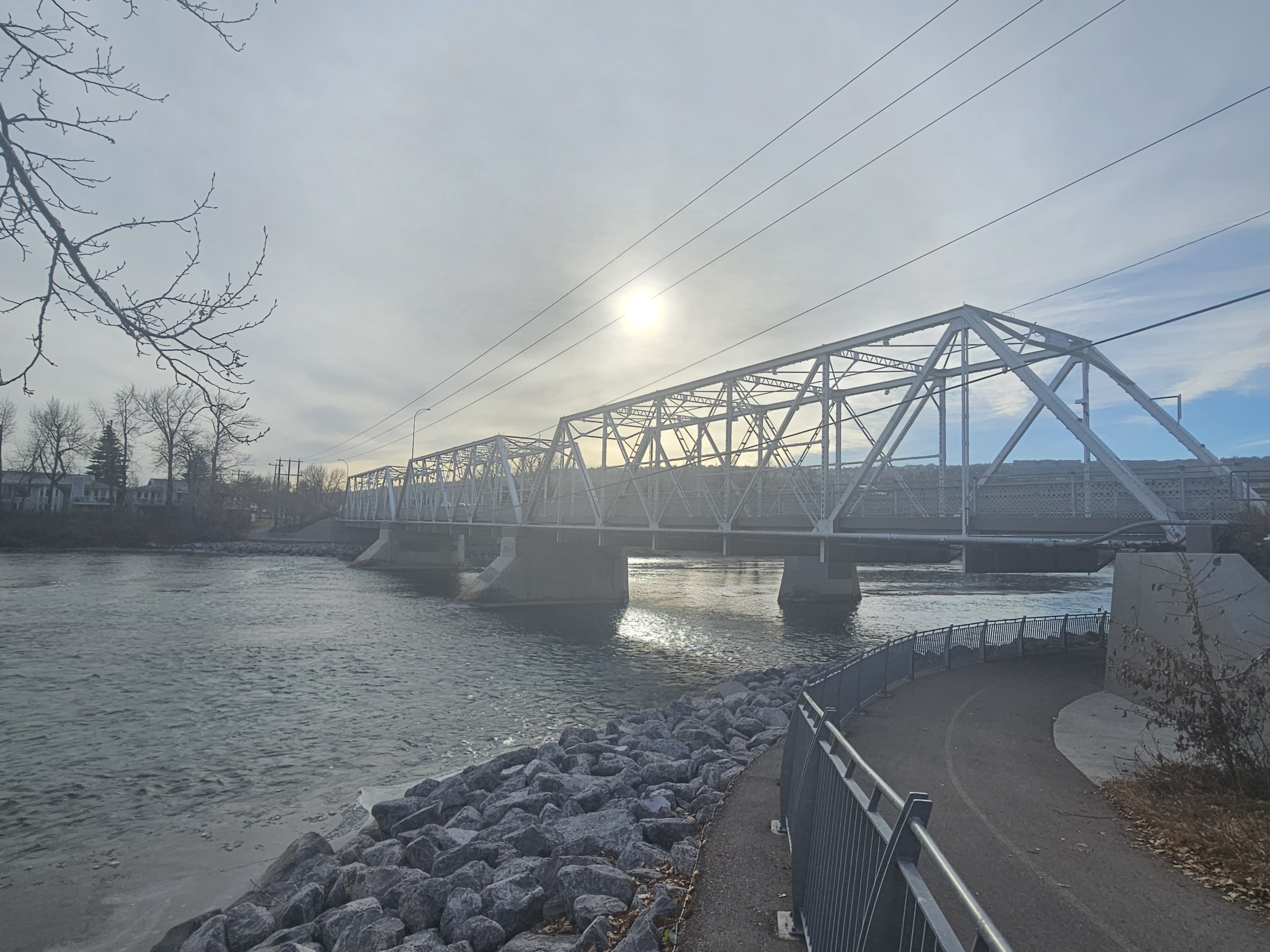
Hextall Bridge, partly funded by Shouldice to connect Bowness to Shouldice Terrace (now Montgomery), photographed in 2023.

News of Shouldice and McKay's donation in 1909, and plans to introduce a park, stoked interest in the area as a place to live. Shouldice subsequently divided up much of his remaining farmland into residential lots. A suburban unincorporated community, named Shouldice Terrace, developed from November 1910 onwards, when plots became available for sale. Calgary's municipal government agreed to introduce streetcar services to the area by the end of 1911.

Shouldice's neighbour over the Bow River was John Hextall, founder of the community of Bowness. In 1913, Shouldice partly financed the construction of Hextall Bridge, which facilitated early streetcar transit links between Bowness and Calgary. Today, a road bridge provides vehicular access between Montgomery to Bowness, though Hextall Bridge remains in use by pedestrians and cyclists.

Because Alberta already had a hamlet named after Shouldice, postal delivery errors were a frequent problem for residents of both. In 1943, the Canadian Post Office refused to grant the community near Calgary a post office of its own, as there was already a Shouldice post office in the original hamlet. The Shouldice family subsequently assented to changing the community's name to Montgomery, after Bernard Law Montgomery. Montgomery functioned as an unincorporated community until 1958, when it became a town. In 1963, Montgomery was absorbed by Calgary.

=== Contributions to the establishment of Mount Royal College: 1911–1925 ===
The Shouldices' reverend, Dr. Kerby, believed that education was necessary to create a better society. In 1911, he began seeking financial support to become the founding Principal of an institute of higher education, Mount Royal College (today Mount Royal University). In November that year, Shouldice and his neighbour Mackay became two of Mount Royal College's earliest and most significant donors, contributing 50 acres of downtown land to the project. The college had been open for three months at the time of the donation, operating out of temporary quarters known as 'The Barn.'

While Shouldice's 1911 land donation contributed to the successful establishment of the college, Calgary experienced a real estate crash in 1913. As the college struggled to afford property taxes, or to fund construction, the land came to represent a financial burden. By the 1930s, the college was forced to return the land to the estate of donors or the City of Calgary. Beyond the donation of land, however, Shouldice provided ongoing financial backing to the college's operations throughout his lifetime. Eulogizing at Shouldice's funeral in 1925, Kerby remembered Shouldice as "always loyal and kind" to Kerby.

=== Construction of the Shouldice Residence: 1911 ===
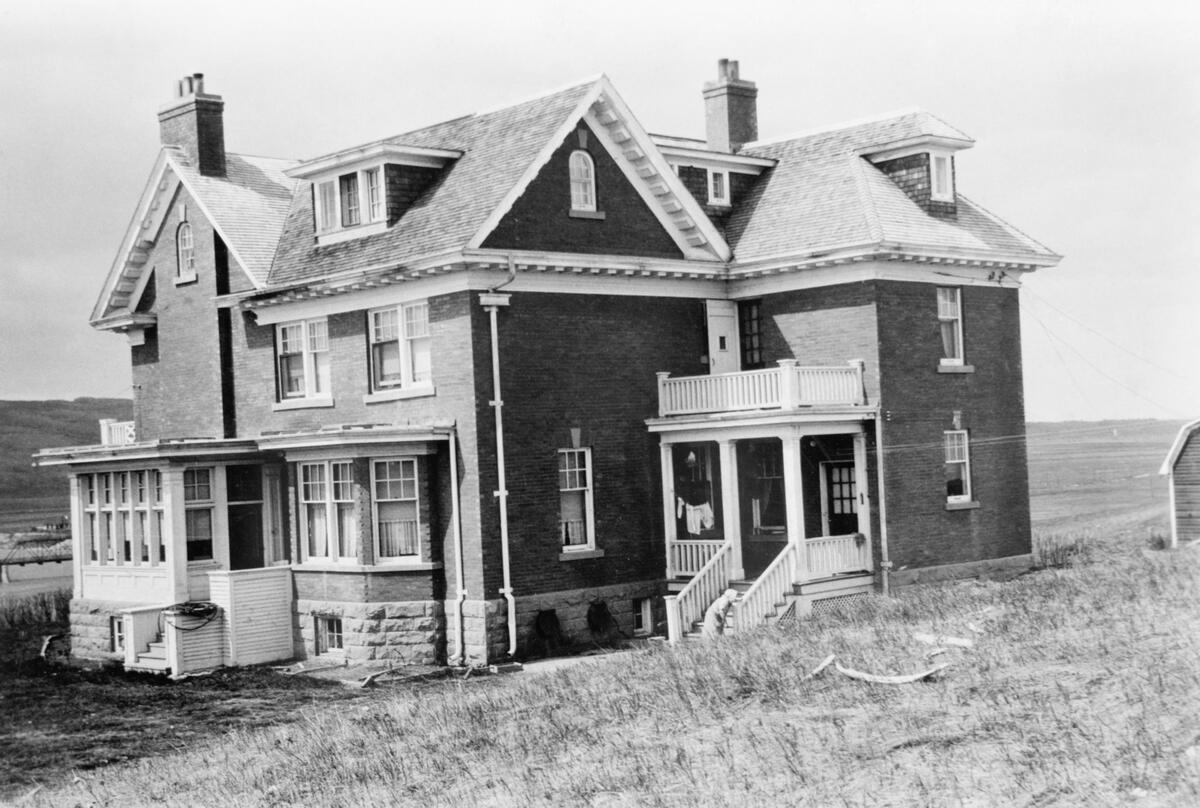
Brick home built by James Shouldice, 1911.

In 1911 Shouldice funded the construction of a 25-room brick mansion for his family to occupy when they were not in Calgary or Gleichen. The Shouldice Residence was located uphill, overlooking Shouldice Terrace, close to what is today the junction of Home Road and 52 Street in Montgomery. In 2025, the Montgomery Community Association would recall the building as being "resplendent with a gleaming spiral staircase and oak trim, and panoramic views of the valley."

By 1937, the residence was converted into a crematorium. During its initial years of operation, it was the only crematorium in operation between Winnipeg and Vancouver. The building was demolished in 1974 due to concerns that it was a threat to the stability of the slope upon which it was located. In a 1982 article for the Calgary Herald, local historian Jack Peach described the Shouldice Residence as one of the "prestigious buildings" that had shaped Calgary's past.

== Death ==
In January 1925 Shouldice experienced heart problems while on vacation in California. He seemingly recovered, but after returning to Alberta, overexerted himself by resuming his usual farming activities and ultimately suffered a relapse. He fell seriously ill in April and was taken to Calgary General Hospital, where he was treated for a month before his death on May 9, 1925.

The Calgary Herald described him as "known to everyone" in the city at the time of his death. News of his passing subsequently generated "a sense of personal loss" among thousands of Calgary's residents, even those who "never knew him personally." His funeral was held May 11 at the Methodist church that he and his wife, Mary, had attended since moving to Calgary. Kerby, founding principal of the college (Mount Royal) that had received Shouldice's support, performed the eulogy.

Shouldice is buried at Union Cemetery with his wife, Mary, who died August 7, 1939 at the age of 78.

== Family legacy ==
Of James and Mary Shouldice's ten biological children, only one did not survive to adulthood. Their first daughter, Mildred, died aged thirteen months in April 1886. In 1883, the Shouldices adopted a nine-year-old girl from England, Catherine Willis, whose mother had sent her to Canada following her father's death. Though it is unknown how Willis entered the Shouldice's care, the arrangement proved permanent: she moved to Alberta with them in 1901. Her wedding to farmer John Clark in 1903 was held on the family's Namaka ranch.

Four of James and Mary's sons served in the First World War, notably among them their second-eldest, Frederick Lowry Shouldice (April 5, 1883 – February 1, 1952). Frederick, a lawyer by profession, became a Lieutenant-Colonel in the Canadian Armed Forces, serving with the Princess Patricia's Canadian Light Infantry unit. His conduct during the second Battle of Cambrai earned him a Military Cross for bravery. He resumed legal practice in Calgary in 1919 and was made King's Counsel in 1930.

Third-eldest son Edward Earle Shouldice (October 3, 1890 – August 20, 1965) graduated from the University of Toronto in 1916 and became a physician in Ontario. He served as a private in the First World War, then as a recruitment physician during the Second World War. After becoming interested in treating hernias upon finding that a number of recruits could not enlist due to the condition, he developed the Shouldice surgical technique that remains in use, and opened Shouldice Hospital in 1945.

Third-eldest daughter Gertrude Ethel Lawrie (née Shouldice) (November 14, 1888 – October 6, 1981) worked as a teacher between 1911 and 1917, when she became engaged to Robert Lawrie. The couple joined the war effort that year. Gertrude worked as a nurse with the Voluntary Aid Detachment at a military hospital in London, while her fiancé was stationed in Europe. One of her pupils in 1916 was Francis Winspear, who went on to fund the Francis Winspear Centre for Music in Edmonton. Winspear, along with three classmates, held a reunion dinner with Lawrie in 1956, partly crediting her for their success.
