= 2nd Alberta Legislature =

Canadian Legislative Assembly

- Majority parliament
- Mar. 23, 1909 – Mar. 25, 1913

Parliament leaders
- Premier: Alexander Cameron Rutherford; September 2, 1905 – May 26, 1910
- Arthur Sifton; May 26, 1910 – October 30, 1917
- Cabinets: Rutherford cabinet Sifton cabinet
- Leader of the Opposition: Richard Bennett; February 10, 1910 – May 26, 1910
- Edward Michener; November 10, 1910 – April 5, 1917

Party caucuses
- Government: Liberal Party
- Opposition: Conservative Party
- Crossbench: Socialist Party

Legislative Assembly
- Speaker of the Assembly: Charles W. Fisher; March 15, 1906 – May 15, 1919
- Members: 41 MLA seats

Sovereign
- Monarch: Edward VII; January 22, 1901 – May 6, 1910
- George V May 6, 1910 – January 20, 1936
- Lieutenant governor: Hon. George Hedley Vicars Bulyea; September 1, 1905 – October 20, 1915

Sessions
- 1st session February 10, 1910 – May 26, 1910
- 2nd session November 10, 1910 – December 11, 1910
- 3rd session November 30, 1911 – February 16, 1912
- 4th session February 11, 1913 – March 25, 1913
← 1st	→ 3rd

The 2nd Alberta Legislative Assembly was in session from March 23, 1909, to April 17, 1913, with the membership of the assembly determined by the results of the 1909 Alberta general election which was held on March 22, 1909. The Legislature officially resumed on March 23, 1909, and continued until the fourth session was prorogued and dissolved on March 25, 1913, prior to the 1913 Alberta general election.

Alberta's second government was controlled by the majority Liberal Party led by Premier Alexander Rutherford until he resigned on May 26, 1910 due to the Alberta and Great Waterways Railway scandal, Rutherford was subsequently replaced by Arthur Sifton. The Official Opposition was the Conservative Party led by Richard Bennett for the first session, followed by Edward Michener for the remaining sessions. The Speaker was Charles W. Fisher who continued in the role from the 1st assembly, and would serve in the role until his death from the 1918 flu pandemic in 1919.

The total number of seats in the assembly was increased from 25 contested in the 1905 election to 41.

== Bills ==
=== The Act respecting the Legislative Assembly of Alberta ===
Prior to the 1913 election, the Liberal government introduced An Act to amend the Act respecting the Legislative Assembly of Alberta which increased the number of seats in the Alberta Legislature from 41 to 56 and redistributed the boundaries of several constituencies.

=== The Direct Legislation Act ===
Following pressure from the growing United Farmers of Alberta, the Alberta Legislature passed The Direct Legislation Act, which was assented to on March 25, 1913. The Act enabled a referendum to be held if an initiative petition received a sufficient number of signatures, which was electors equally ten per cent of the votes polled in the previous general election, and an initiative petition could succeed if endorsed by 20 per cent of the votes polled in the previous election. The Act afforded a number of protections for the Legislature, noting that any initiative which would create a grant or charge on public revenue, or outside of provincial jurisdiction was invalid. While the Conservative Party's 1912 convention included an endorsement of Direct Legislation provisions, the party leader Edward Michener called it a "vote-catching device" and George Hoadley wondered if the Act would be successful compared to similar legislation in Saskatchewan. Socialist member Charles M. O'Brien described the bill as "ridiculous" and "neither consistent, systematic or scientific".

== Scandals ==
The Alberta and Great Waterways Railway Scandal was a political scandal in 1910, which forced the resignation of the Liberal provincial government of Alexander Cameron Rutherford. Rutherford and his government were accused of giving loan guarantees to private interests for the construction of the Alberta and Great Waterways (A&GW) Railway that substantially exceeded the actual cost of construction, and which paid interest considerably above the market rate. They were also accused of exercising insufficient oversight over the railway's operations.

The scandal split the Liberal Party: Rutherford's Minister of Public Works, William Henry Cushing, resigned from his government and publicly attacked its railway policy, and a large portion of the Liberal caucus voted to defeat the government in the Legislative Assembly of Alberta. Although the government survived all of these votes, and Rutherford largely placated the legislature by appointing a royal commission to investigate the affair, pressure from Lieutenant-Governor George Bulyea forced Rutherford's resignation and his replacement by Arthur Sifton.

The royal commission reported months after Rutherford had already resigned. The majority did not find Rutherford or his cabinet guilty of any wrongdoing, but criticized them for poor judgment, both in relation to the loan guarantees and in relation to the exemptions the A&GW received from provincial legislation; a minority report was more sympathetic, and declared the allegations against them "disproved". James Cornwall, a Liberal backbencher who supported Rutherford, fared somewhat worse: his personal financial involvement in the railway gave rise to "suspicious circumstances", but he too was not proven guilty of any wrongdoing.

Besides provoking Rutherford's resignation, the scandal opened rifts in the Liberal Party that took years to heal. Sifton eventually smoothed over most of these divisions, but was frustrated in his railway policy by legal defeats. He ultimately adopted a similar policy to Rutherford's, and the A&GW was eventually built by private interests using the money raised from provincial loan guarantees. The Liberals went on to be re-elected in 1913 and 1917.

== Party composition ==
Affiliation	1st Assembly dissolution	Elected in 1909	Standings at dissolution
Liberal	22	36	33
Conservative	2	2	6
Socialist		1	1
Independent		1	1
Independent Liberal		1	
Labour	1		
Total	25	41	41
Government Majority	20	31	25

== Members elected during the 1909 Alberta Provincial Election ==
For complete electoral history, see individual districts

2nd Alberta Legislative Assembly
District	Member	Party	First elected	No.# of term(s)
Alexandra	Alwyn Bramley-Moore	Liberal	1909	1st term
Athabasca	Jean Côté	Liberal	1909	1st term
Calgary	William Cushing	Liberal	1905	2nd term
Calgary	Richard Bennett	Conservative	1909	1st term
Calgary	Thomas Tweedie (1911)	Conservative	1911	1st term
Camrose	George P. Smith	Liberal	1909	1st term
Cardston	John William Woolf	Liberal	1905	2nd term
Cardston	Martin Woolf (1912)	Liberal	1912	1st term
Claresholm	Malcolm McKenzie	Liberal	1909	1st term
Cochrane	Charles W. Fisher	Liberal	1905	2nd term
Didsbury	Joseph Stauffer	Liberal	1909	1st term
Edmonton #1	Charles Wilson Cross	Liberal	1905	2nd term
Edmonton #2	John McDougall	Liberal	1909	1st term
Gleichen	Ezra Riley	Liberal	1906	2nd term
Gleichen	Harold Riley (1911)	Conservative	1911	1st term
High River	Louis Roberts	Liberal	1909	1st term
Innisfail	John A. Simpson	Liberal	1905	2nd term
Lac Ste. Anne	Peter Gunn	Liberal	1909	1st term
Lacombe	William Puffer	Liberal	1905	2nd term
Leduc	Robert Telford	Liberal	1905	2nd term
Lethbridge City	William Ashbury Buchanan	Liberal	1909	1st term
Lethbridge City	John Smith Stewart (1911)	Conservative	1911	1st term
Lethbridge District	Archibald J. McLean	Independent Liberal	1909	1st term
Lethbridge District	Archibald J. McLean	Liberal	1909	1st term
Macleod	Colin Genge	Liberal	1909	1st term
Macleod	Robert Patterson (1910)	Farmers	1910	1st term
Macleod	Robert Patterson (1910)	Conservative	1910	1st term
Medicine Hat	William Finlay	Liberal	1905	2nd term
Medicine Hat	Charles R. Mitchell (1910)	Liberal	1910	1st term
Nanton	John M. Glendenning	Liberal	1909	1st term
Okotoks	George Hoadley	Conservative	1909	1st term
Olds	Duncan Marshall	Liberal	1909	1st term
Pakan	Prosper-Edmond Lessard	Liberal	1909	1st term
Peace River	James Cornwall	Liberal	1909	1st term
Peace River	James Cornwall	Independent	1909	1st term
Pembina	Henry William McKenney	Liberal	1909	1st term
Pincher Creek	David Warnock	Liberal	1909	1st term
Pincher Creek	John Kemmis (1911)	Conservative	1911	1st term
Ponoka	William A. Campbell	Liberal	1909	1st term
Red Deer	Edward Michener	Independent	1909	1st term
Rocky Mountain	Charles M. O'Brien	Socialist	1909	1st term
Sedgewick	Charles Stewart	Liberal	1909	1st term
St. Albert	Lucien Boudreau	Liberal	1909	1st term
Stettler	Robert L. Shaw	Liberal	1909	1st term
Stony Plain	John McPherson	Liberal	1905	2nd term
Strathcona	Alexander Rutherford	Liberal	1905	2nd term
Sturgeon	John R. Boyle	Liberal	1905	2nd term
Vegreville	James Bismark Holden	Liberal	1906	2nd term
Vermilion	Archibald Campbell	Liberal	1909	1st term
Vermilion	Arthur Sifton (1910)	Liberal	1910	1st term
Victoria	Francis A. Walker	Liberal	1905	2nd term
Wetaskiwin	Charles H. Olin	Liberal	1909	1st term

== Standings changes after election ==
=== By-elections ===
By-elections are only shown if new members were elected

District	Member	Party	Reason for By-Election
Medicine Hat	Charles R. Mitchell	Liberal	June 29, 1910—Resignation of William Finlay
Vermilion	Arthur Sifton	Liberal	June 29, 1910—Resignation of Archie Campbell to provide seat for Premier Arthur Sifton
Gleichen	Archibald J. McArthur	Liberal	October 3, 1910—Resignation of Ezra Riley in protest against Liberal Party Leadership
Macleod	Robert Patterson	Farmers	October 3, 1910—Death of Colin Genge
Calgary #2	Thomas Tweedie	Conservative	October 31, 1911—Resignation of Richard Bennett to run for House of Commons
Gleichen	Harold Riley	Conservative	October 31, 1911—Death of Archibald John McArthur
Lethbridge City	John Smith Stewart	Conservative	October 31, 1911—Resignation of Mr. William Buchanan to run for House for Commons
Pincher Creek	John Kemmis	Conservative	October 31, 1911—Resignation of David Warnock to run for House of Commons
Cardston	Martin Woolf	Liberal	May 27, 1912—Resignation of Mr. John Woolf

=== Floor crossings ===
- June 22, 1910—Archibald McLean crossed the floor to the Liberal Party to accept a cabinet portfolio, he was acclaimed in a by-election
- Date Unknown—James Cornwall leaves the Liberal Party and becomes an independent
