= 1st Alberta Legislature =

- Majority parliament
- Nov. 9, 1905 – Mar. 22, 1909

Parliament leaders
- Premier: Alexander Cameron Rutherford; September 2, 1905 – May 26, 1910
- Cabinet: Rutherford cabinet
- Leader of the Opposition: Albert John Robertson; March 15, 1906 – February 25, 1909

Party caucuses
- Government: Liberal Party
- Opposition: Conservative Party
- Crossbench: Labour Party

Legislative Assembly
- Speaker of the Assembly: Charles W. Fisher; March 15, 1906 – May 15, 1919
- Members: 25 MLA seats

Sovereign
- Monarch: Edward VII; January 22, 1901 – May 6, 1910
- Lieutenant Governor: Hon. George Hedley Vicars Bulyea; September 1, 1905 – October 20, 1915

Sessions
- 1st session March 15, 1906 – May 9, 1906
- 2nd session January 24, 1907 – March 15, 1907
- 3rd session January 16, 1908 – March 5, 1908
- 4th session January 14, 1909 – February 25, 1909
→ 2nd

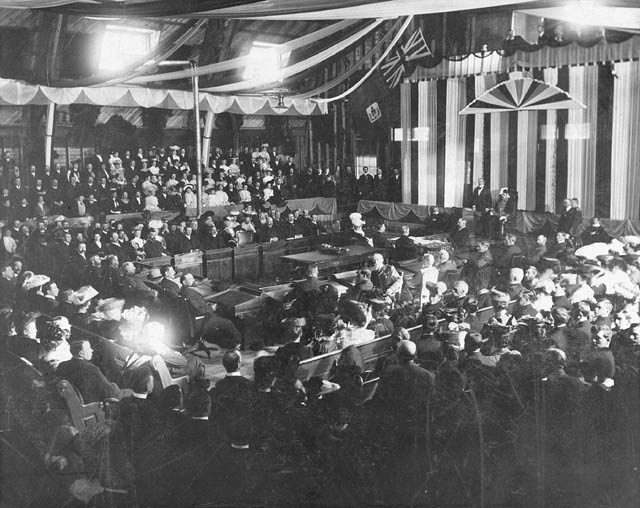
Formal opening of the Legislative Assembly, March 15, 1906.

The 1st Alberta Legislative Assembly was in session from November 9, 1905, to Monday, March 22, 1909, with the membership of the assembly determined by the results of the 1905 Alberta general election which was held on November 9, 1905. The Legislature officially began on November 9, 1905, and continued until the fourth session was prorogued on February 25, 1909, and dissolved the next day on February 26, 1909, prior to the 1909 Alberta general election.

Alberta's first government was controlled by the majority Liberal Party led by Premier Alexander Rutherford. The Official Opposition was the Conservative Party led by Albert John Robertson. The Speaker was Charles W. Fisher who served in the role until his death from the 1918 flu pandemic in 1919 partway through the 4th Alberta Legislature.

== History of the First Legislature ==
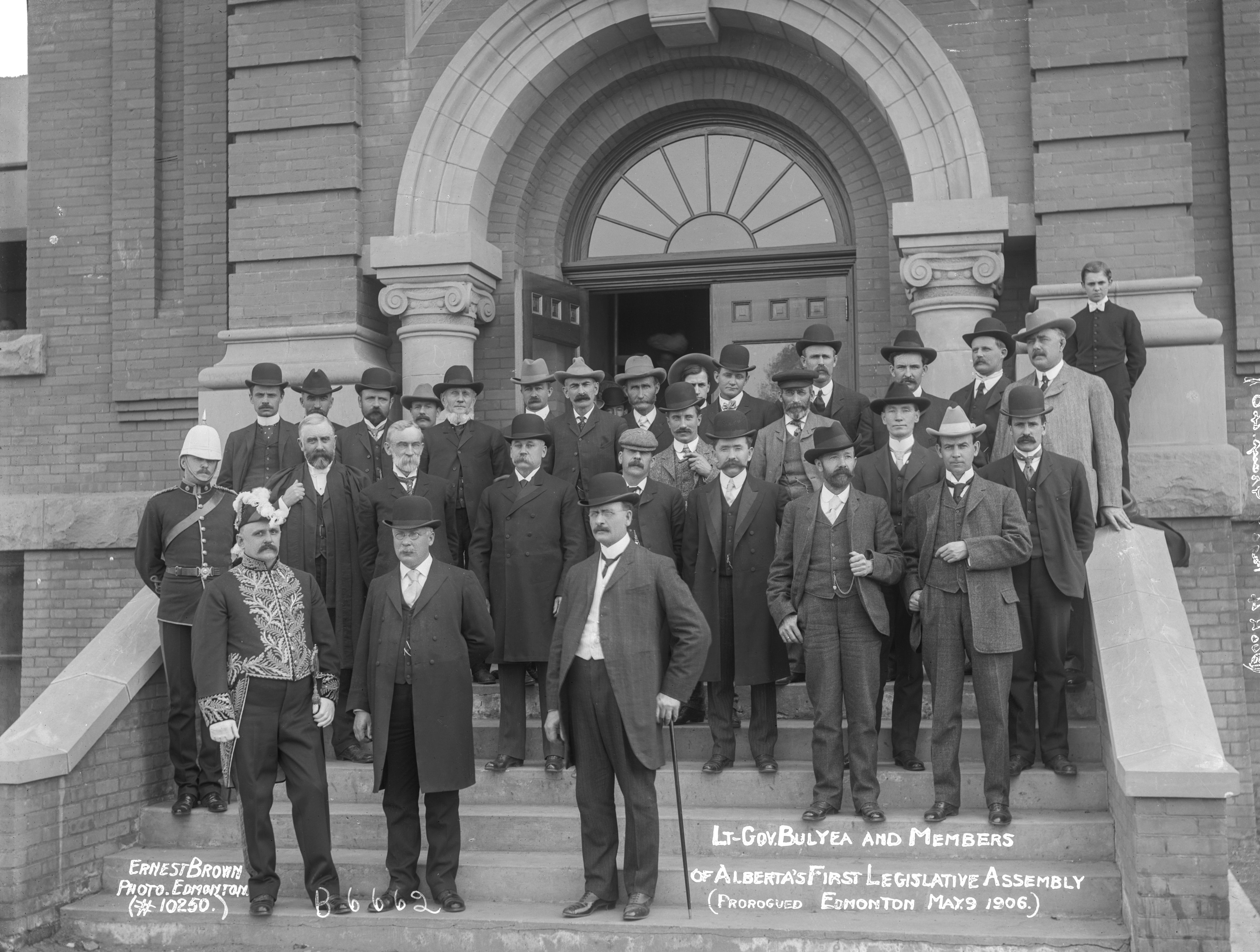
Members of the 1st Alberta Legislature on March 16, 1906

The 1st Alberta Legislative Assembly came about after Alberta entered Confederation with the Alberta Act. The assembly met for the first time in 1906 under a strong Alberta Liberal Party majority. Construction of the Alberta Legislature Building would not begin until 1907, so the assembly would meet in the newly completed McKay Avenue School for the first two sessions of the First Legislative Assembly of Alberta in 1906 and 1907. Important bills passed in those sessions include confirming Edmonton as the provincial capital, the founding of the University of Alberta, establishment of provincial courts, and the provision of charters for several railway companies.

Edmonton was designated as the temporary capital city for Alberta during its creation. One of the major debates that occurred in this assembly was the capital city debate. A number of alternative capital cities were chosen and voted on. In the end partly due to the strong representation around Edmonton and strong Liberal majority, Edmonton was chosen as the permanent capital city in Alberta.

Labor MLA Donald McNabb's by-election victory made him the first third party candidate elected to the legislature and helped raise the strength of the labour movement in the Lethbridge area that would have an effect in Alberta politics for quite some time to come.

=== Telephone policy ===
Liberal government would make a number of large-scale forays into government operation of utilities, the most notable of which being the creation of Alberta Government Telephones. In 1906, Alberta's municipalities legislation was passed and included a provision authorizing municipalities to operate telephone companies. Several, including Edmonton, did so, alongside private companies. The largest private company was the Bell Telephone Company, which held a monopoly over service in Calgary. Such monopolies and the private firms' refusal to extend their services into sparsely-populated and unprofitable rural areas aroused demand for provincial entry into the market, which was effected in 1907. The government constructed a number of lines, beginning with one between Calgary and Banff, and it also purchased Bell's lines for $675,000.

Alberta's public telephone system was financed by debt, which was unusual for a government like Rutherford's, which.was generally committed to the principle of "pay as you go". Rutherford's stated rationale was that the cost of such a large capital project should not.be borne by a single generation and that incurring debt to finance a corresponding asset was, in contrast to operating deficits, acceptable. Though the move was popular at the time, it would prove not to be financially astute. By focusing on areas neglected by existing companies, the government was entering into the most expensive and least profitable fields of telecommunication. Such.problems would not come to fruition until Rutherford had left office, however. In the short term, the government's involvement in the telephone business helped it to a sweeping victory in the 1909 election. The Liberals won 37 of 41 seats in the newly expanded legislature.

Bills Report 1st Legislative Assembly
Party	No. of Bills	Royal Assent	Withdrawn	Killed
First Session
Liberal	83	76	9	0
Conservative	0	0	0	0
Second Session
Liberal	54	49	5	0
Conservative	0	0	0	0
Third Session
Liberal	45	43	0	2
Conservative	2	0	1	1
Fourth Session
Liberal	54	48	3	3
Labour	3	2	0	1
Conservative	0	0	0	0

=== Labour bills ===
Rutherford's government legislated an eight-hour day, as well, Rutherford's government also passed workers' compensation legislation designed to make such compensation automatic, rather than requiring the injured worker to sue his employer. Labour representatives criticized the bill for failing to impose fines on negligent employers, for limiting construction workers' eligibility under the program to injuries sustained while they were working on buildings more than 40 feet (12 m) high, and for exempting casual labourers. It also viewed the maximum payout of $1,500 as inadequate. In response to these concerns, the maximum was increased to $1,800 and the minimum building height reduced to 30 feet (9.1 m). In response to farmers' concerns, farm labourers were made exempt from the bill entirely.

== Party composition ==
Affiliation	Elected in 1905	Standings at dissolution
Liberal	23	22
Conservative	2	2
Labour		1
Total	25	25
Government Majority	21	19

== Members of the Legislative Assembly elected ==
For complete electoral history, see individual districts

District	Member	Party	First elected	No.# of term(s)
Athabasca	William Bredin	Liberal	1905	1st term
Banff	Charles W. Fisher	Liberal	1905	1st term
Calgary	William Cushing	Liberal	1905	1st term
Cardston	John William Woolf	Liberal	1905	1st term
Edmonton	Charles Wilson Cross	Liberal	1905	1st term
Gleichen	Charles Stuart	Liberal	1905	1st term
Gleichen	Ezra Riley (1906)	Liberal	1906	1st term
High River	Albert Robertson	Conservative	1905	1st term
Innisfail	John A. Simpson	Liberal	1905	1st term
Lacombe	William Puffer	Liberal	1905	1st term
Leduc	Robert Telford	Liberal	1905	1st term
Lethbridge	Leverett DeVeber	Liberal	1905	1st term
Lethbridge	William Simmons (1906)	Liberal	1906	1st term
Lethbridge	Donald McNabb (1909)	Labour	1909	1st term
Macleod	Malcolm McKenzie	Liberal	1905	1st term
Medicine Hat	William Finlay	Liberal	1905	1st term
Pincher Creek	John Plummer Marcellus	Liberal	1905	1st term
Ponoka	John R. McLeod	Liberal	1905	1st term
Red Deer	John T. Moore	Liberal	1905	1st term
Rosebud	Cornelius Hiebert	Conservative	1905	1st term
St. Albert	Henry William McKenney	Liberal	1905	1st term
Stony Plain	John McPherson	Liberal	1905	1st term
Strathcona	Alexander Cameron Rutherford	Liberal	1905	1st term
Sturgeon	John R. Boyle	Liberal	1905	1st term
Vermilion	Matthew McCauley	Liberal	1905	1st term
Vermilion	James Bismark Holden (1906)	Liberal	1906	1st term
Victoria	Francis A. Walker	Liberal	1905	1st term
Wetaskiwin	Anthony Rosenroll	Liberal	1905	1st term

== Member changes after the election ==
District	Member	Party	Reason for By-Election
Lethbridge	William Simmons	Liberal	April 12, 1906 —Appointment of Mr. Leverett DeVeber to Canadian Senate
Vermilion	James Bismark Holden	Liberal	July 16, 1906 —Appointment of Mr. Matthew McCauley as warden of Edmonton Penitentiary
Gleichen	Ezra Riley	Liberal	December 7, 1906 —Appointment of Mr. Charles Stuart to Judicial Bench
Lethbridge	Donald McNabb	Labour	January 8, 1909 —Resignation of Mr. William Simmons to run for House of Commons
