= Shouldice =

Shouldice, Sholdice, Shoultice or Shultice is a surname. It usually originated as an Anglicization of the German language surname Schultheis, among the descendants of Palatine German immigrants in Ireland and North America.

Notable people with the surname include:

- James Shouldice (1850–1925), Canadian politician and rancher
- Jack Shouldice (1882–1965), Irish gaelic footballer
- Mark Shouldice (born 1977), American YouTuber and conservative political commentator
- Warren Shouldice (born 1983), Canadian freestyle skier

== See also ==
- Shouldice Hernia Centre
- Shouldice, Ontario
