= John Peter McArthur =

Canadian politician

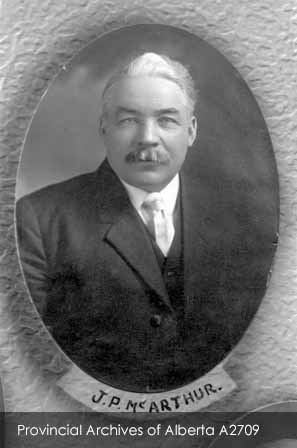

Member of the Legislative Assembly of Alberta
- In office 1913–1917
- Preceded by: Harold Riley
- Succeeded by: Fred Davis
- Constituency: Gleichen

Personal details
- Born: July 16, 1862 Paisley, Canada West
- Died: February 19, 1942 (aged 79) Calgary, Alberta
- Party: Liberal
- Occupation: rancher

John Peter McArthur (July 16, 1862 – February 19, 1942) was a politician from Alberta, Canada.

McArthur first ran for the Legislative Assembly of Alberta in a by-election on October 31, 1911 after the death of his brother Archibald J. McArthur a few months earlier. His opponent was Harold Riley who was the brother of Ezra Riley, who held the seat 1906-1910,. In the so-called "brothers by-election", McArthur was handily defeated as Riley and the Conservatives surprisingly swept this and three other by-elections held on the same day.

In the 1913 Alberta general election, incumbent Riley ran in the neighboring electoral district of Bow Valley district, leaving the riding vacant. McArthur won the seat and held it for four years before being defeated by Fred Davis in the 1917 Alberta general election.
