= Charles Stuart (Canadian politician) =

Canadian politician

Charles Allan Stuart
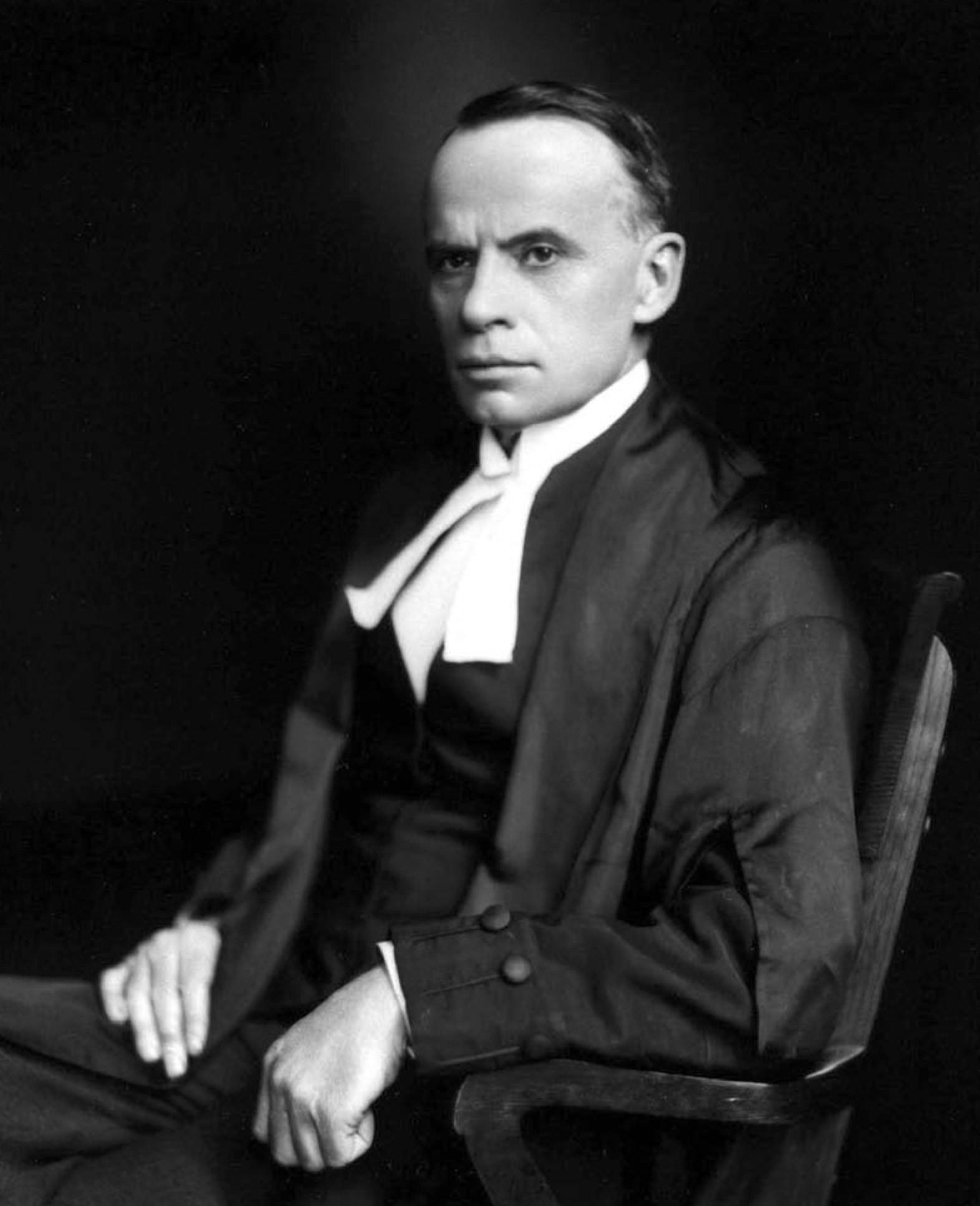

Member of the Legislative Assembly of Alberta
- In office November 9, 1905 – October 8, 1906
- Preceded by: New district
- Succeeded by: Ezra Riley
- Constituency: Gleichen

Alderman on the Calgary City Council
- In office January 2, 1905 – January 2, 1906

Chancellor of the University of Alberta
- In office 1908–1926
- Succeeded by: Nicolas Dubois Dominic Beck

Personal details
- Born: August 3, 1864 Middlesex County, Canada West
- Died: March 5, 1926 (aged 61) Calgary, Alberta
- Party: Liberal
- Spouse: Beatrice Roxburgh
- Children: Alan Roxburgh Stuart; Charles Eric Stuart; Gerald Campbell Stuart
- Education: University of Toronto, Osgoode Hall Law School
- Occupation: Lawyer

Charles Allan Stuart (August 3, 1864 – March 5, 1926) was a Canadian politician and jurist in the province of Alberta. Born in Canada West and educated in the same area after it became Ontario, he came west in 1897 and set up a law practice in Calgary. After a failed election bid to the Legislative Assembly of the Northwest Territories, he was elected to the Calgary City Council and then to the Legislative Assembly of Alberta. He resigned before the end of his term in the latter body to accept a judgeship on the Supreme Court of the Northwest Territories. He was later appointed to the new Supreme Court of Alberta. He was also the first Chancellor of the University of Alberta, serving in that capacity from 1908 until his death in 1926.

== Early life ==
Stuart was born in Caradoc, Canada West on August 13, 1894. He attended Middlesex County College and then the University of Toronto, graduating from the latter in 1891 with a gold medal in classics; he subsequently lectured there in constitutional history. He graduated from Osgoode Hall Law School in 1894 with a Bachelor of Laws, and was admitted to the Law Society of Upper Canada in 1896.

He practiced briefly in Ontario before falling ill, prompting him to travel to Mexico to recuperate. In the spring of 1897, he travelled west to stay at his brother's ranch. In February 1898, he moved to Calgary and set up a law practice with Peter McCarthy, K.C. McCarthy died in 1901, at which time Stuart joined Sifton and Short, one of whose partners was future Premier of Alberta Arthur Sifton.

== Political career ==
Stuart first sought political office when he ran in West Calgary, a district in the Legislative Assembly of the Northwest Territories, in a by-election variously identified as taking place in March 1900 or on March 22, 1901. He was soundly defeated by future Prime Minister of Canada R. B. Bennett. Stuart was elected alderman on the Calgary city council in the December 1904 election, and served from January 2, 1905 until January 2, 1906.

During the lead-up to Alberta's 1905 creation as a province, Stuart was initially critical of the terms imposed by the Liberal federal government of Wilfrid Laurier; these terms kept control of natural resources, which was held by the provincial governments of the older provinces, under federal control. Stuart was a Liberal, however, and he eventually joined his party in defending these terms. He was less sanguine about Alberta's new electoral boundaries, which disproportionately favoured the province's north, and about the Liberals' policy of fixing Calgary's rival Edmonton as the interim provincial capital, with the first legislature to make the final decision—he felt that the issue should be put to a vote in the first provincial election. He lost both of these fights, and once again loyally adhered to his party's program.

When Alberta became a province, Stuart became secretary of the Alberta Liberal Association, and he played a significant role in the Liberal campaign in the 1905 provincial election. He ran as the Liberals' candidate in Gleichen that election, and defeated Conservative John W. Hayes 667 votes to 640. As MLA, Stuart advocated for Calgary's selection as permanent capital (among other arguments, he pointed out Calgary's proximity to the beautiful Rocky Mountains).

Stuart's time in the legislature came to a close after less than a year, when in October 1906 he resigned to take up a judgeship on the Supreme Court of the Northwest Territories; when Alberta created its own court the following year, he became one of its first judges.

== Life after politics ==
As Supreme Court judge, Stuart found in favour of the Alberta government in a 1912 suit against the Royal Bank of Canada. In the aftermath of the Alberta and Great Waterways Railway scandal, the government had attempted to take control of money that had been raised from a bond issue in support of the Alberta and Great Waterways Railway, which had defaulted on its obligations. The Royal Bank, where the money was deposited, refused to turn it over to the government, which sued. Stuart found that the government was entitled to the money, but his ruling was overturned by the Judicial Committee of the Privy Council in 1913.

In 1921, Stuart was elevated to the Supreme Court's newly created Appellate Division. While sitting on this court, he upheld a trial decision convicting a prostitute, who appealed on the basis that the magistrate who convicted her, Alice Jamieson, was, by virtue of being a woman, not legally a person and therefore ineligible to serve as magistrate. This decision was a prelude to the famous Persons Case, which found that Canadian women were indeed persons.

Stuart became the first Chancellor of the University of Alberta in 1908, and served until his death; the university awarded him an honorary doctorate of laws in 1915. Charles Stuart died March 5, 1926.

== Electoral record ==
1905 Alberta general election: Gleichen
Party	Candidate	Votes	%	±%
Liberal	Charles A. Stuart	667	51.03%	–
Conservative	John W. Hayes	640	48.97%	–
Total		1,307	–	–
Rejected, spoiled and declined		N/A	–	–
Eligible electors / turnout		1,307	100.00%	–
Liberal pickup new district.				
Source(s) Source: "Gleichen Official Results 1905 Alberta general election". Alberta Heritage Community Foundation.

1901 by-election results (West Calgary)	Turnout N.A.	
R. B. Bennett	562	66.20%
Charles Allan Stuart	287	33.80%
