= Nicolas Dubois Dominic Beck =

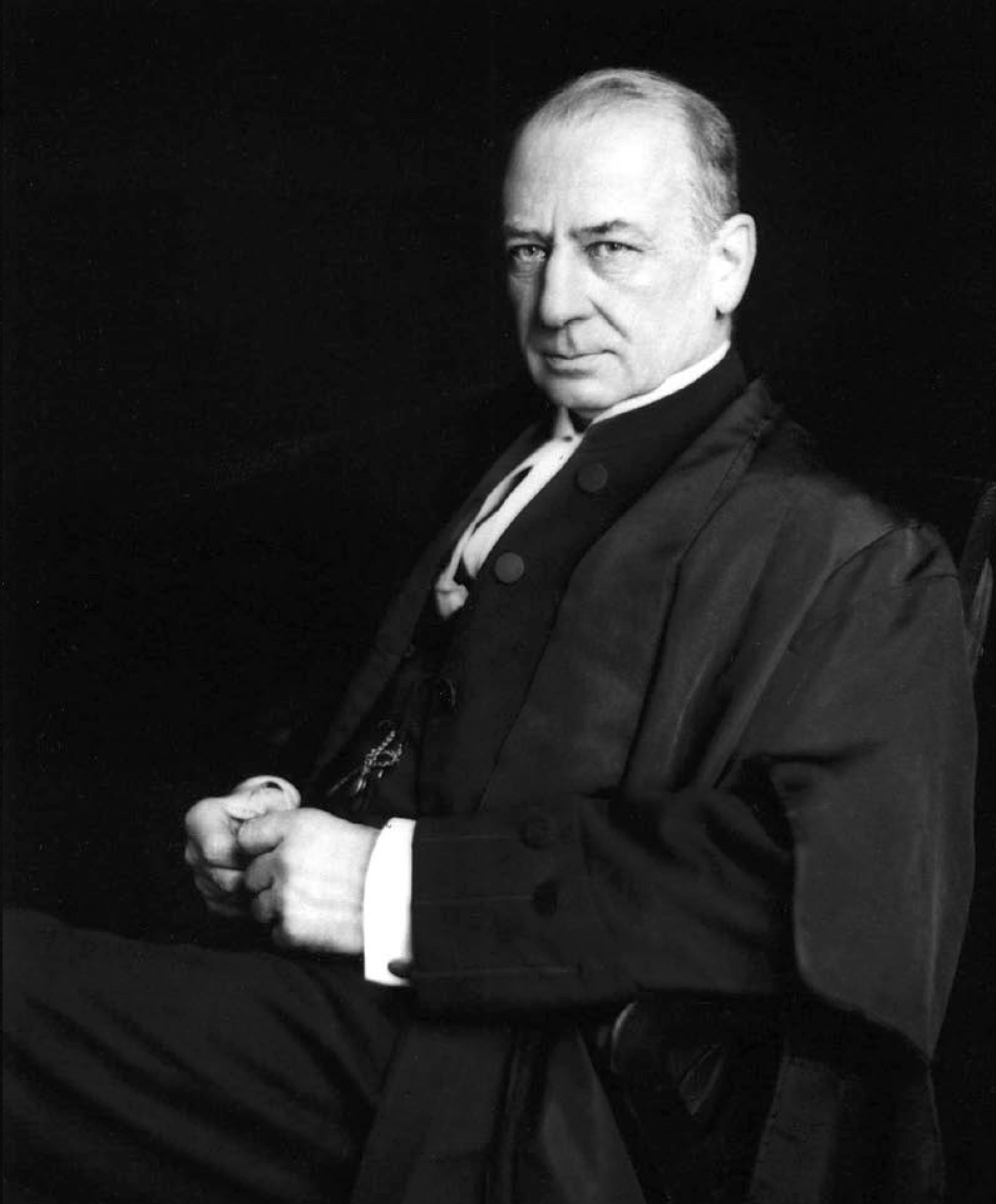

Chancellor of the University of Alberta
- In office 1926–1927
- Preceded by: Charles Stuart
- Succeeded by: Alexander Cameron Rutherford

Personal details
- Born: May 4, 1857 Cobourg, Ontario, Canada
- Died: May 15, 1928 (aged 71) Seattle, Washington, United States
- Education: University of Toronto
- Occupation: Lawyer

Nicholas Dubois Dominic Beck (May 4, 1857 – May 15, 1928) was a lawyer and jurist in Alberta, Canada.

== Early life ==
Beck was born in Cobourg, Ontario on May 4, 1857, to Reverend J.W.R. and Georgina (Boulton) Beck. Nicholas F. Beck was his grandfather.

He attended private schools and the Collegiate Institute of Peterboro. He graduated from the University of Toronto and Osgoode Hall Law School with a Bachelor of Laws in 1881, having been practicing in Peterborough, Ontario since 1879.

== Career ==
=== Lawyer ===
He was called to the Ontario bar in 1882, moving his practice to Winnipeg, Manitoba the year after, then made his way further west, to Calgary in 1889 practicing at the firm of Lougheed, McCarthy & Beck, and settling in Edmonton in 1891 to form the firm of Beck, Emery, Newell and Boulton. He then worked as a Crown Prosecutor from 1892 to 1907, being employed by the City of Edmonton. He took silk by becoming Queen's Counsel in 1893. He also served as President of the Law Society of the Northwest Territories from 1901 to 1907, ending his duties with the creation of the Law Society of Alberta in 1907.

=== Justice ===
Beck was appointed to newly created Supreme Court of Alberta in 1907 and was elevated to the Appellate Division when it was created in 1921. He served on the court until his death on May 14, 1928.

=== Chancellor ===
Beck became the first Vice-Chancellor of the University of Alberta in 1908, serving until 1926 when he became the University's second Chancellor. He also served on the university's Senate from 1908 to 1928 and on the Board of Governors from 1926 to 1927.

=== Other ===
Having become a Roman Catholic in 1883, he started editing the Northwest Catholic Review. He also became an editor of the Territorial and Alberta Law Reports. Although his initial career began as a Conservative, he was an ardent Liberal by 1900. In 1910 he was appointed Chairman of the Royal Commission investigating the Alberta and Great Waterways Railway scandal.

== Family and later years ==
Beck had four children: Cyril L., H. Austin, J.C. Landry, and Beatrice who married H. Milton Martin. His first wife was Mary Ethel Lloyd, whom he married in 1886. She died in 1904. He married his second wife, Louisa Teefy, a Toronto area advice columnist, in 1906. He died on May 15, 1928, at the age of 71 while in Seattle, Washington on his honeymoon with his third wife, Jeanne Tilley. He enjoyed playing poker.
