= Gleichen (electoral district) =

Defunct provincial electoral district in Alberta, Canada

Alberta electoral district

Defunct provincial electoral district
- Legislature: Legislative Assembly of Alberta
- District created: 1905
- District abolished: 1963
- First contested: 1905
- Last contested: 1959

Gleichen was a provincial electoral district in Alberta, Canada, mandated to return a single member to the Legislative Assembly of Alberta from 1905 to 1963.

== History ==
Gleichen was one of the original 25 electoral districts contested in the 1905 Alberta general election upon Alberta becoming a province in September 1905.

From 1906 to 1913, two Riley brothers, of the Conservative party, took turns with two McArthur brothers (candidates for the Liberal party) in representing Gleichen in the Alberta Legislature. Ezra Riley represented the Gleichen district from 1906 (by-election) to 1910, then resigned but ran in the subsequent by-election, losing to Archibald J. McArthur. After the death of Archibald McArthur, H.W.H. Riley ran as a Conservative Party candidate against Liberal candidate John Peter McArthur, brother to the late Archibald McArthur. The October 31, 1911 by-election became known as the brothers by-election, as each candidate was a brother of a former Gleichen MLA. Riley won the by-election and served Gleichen until the 1913 election, when he ran in the Bow Valley district and was defeated by George Lane of the Liberal party.

From 1924 to 1956, the district used instant-runoff voting to elect its MLA.

The electoral district was merged with Drumheller prior to the 1963 Alberta general election to form the short lived Drumheller-Gleichen electoral district.

The district was named after the town of Gleichen, Alberta.

=== Members of the Legislative Assembly (MLAs) ===
Members of the Legislative Assembly for Gleichen
Assembly	Years	Member	Party
1st	1905–1906	Charles A. Stuart	Liberal
1st	1906–1909	Ezra H. Riley	Liberal
2nd	1909–1910	Ezra H. Riley	Liberal
2nd	1910–1911	Archibald J. McArthur	Liberal
2nd	1911–1913	Harold Riley	Conservative
3rd	1913–1917	John Peter McArthur	Liberal
4th	1917–1921	Fred Davis	Conservative
5th	1921–1926	John C. Buckley	Social Credit
6th	1926–1930	John C. Buckley	Social Credit
7th	1930–1935	John C. Buckley	Social Credit
8th	1935–1940	Isaac M. McCune	Social Credit
9th	1940–1944	Donald J. McKinnon	Independent
10th	1944–1948	George E. Bell	Social Credit
11th	1948–1952	George E. Bell	Social Credit
12th	1952–1955	George E. Bell	Social Credit
13th	1955–1959	George E. Bell	Social Credit
14th	1959–1963	George E. Bell	Social Credit
See Drumheller-Gleichen electoral district from 1963-1971

== Election results ==
=== 1905 ===
1905 Alberta general election
Party	Candidate	Votes	%	±%
Liberal	Charles A. Stuart	667	51.03%	–
Conservative	John W. Hayes	640	48.97%	–
Total		1,307	–	–
Rejected, spoiled and declined		N/A	–	–
Eligible electors / turnout		1,307	100.00%	–
Liberal pickup new district.				
Source(s) Source: "Gleichen Official Results 1905 Alberta general election". Alberta Heritage Community Foundation.

=== 1906 by-election ===
Alberta provincial by-election, December 7, 1906 Upon Charles Stuart's appointment to the Supreme Court of the Northwest Territories in October 1906
Party	Candidate	Votes	%	±%
Liberal	Ezra Riley	560	56.28%	–
Conservative	William L. Walsh	435	42.72%	–
Total		995	–	–
Rejected, spoiled and declined		N/A	–	–
Eligible electors / turnout		N/A	N/A	–
Liberal hold		Swing		N/A
Source(s) "By-elections". Elections Alberta.

=== 1909 ===
1909 Alberta general election
Party	Candidate	Votes	%	±%
Liberal	Ezra H. Riley	720	57.83%	6.80%
Conservative	James Shouldice	525	42.17%	-6.80%
Total		1,245	–	–
Rejected, spoiled and declined		N/A	–	–
Eligible electors / turnout		1,666	74.37%	–
Liberal hold		Swing		6.80%
Source(s) Source: "Gleichen Official Results 1909 Alberta general election". Alberta Heritage Community Foundation.

=== 1910 by-election ===
Alberta provincial by-election, October 3, 1910 Upon resignation of Ezra Riley in protest against leadership of his party
Party	Candidate	Votes	%	±%
Liberal	Archibald J. McArthur	1,119	54.91%	–
Independent	Ezra Riley	919	45.09%	–
Total		2,038	–	–
Rejected, spoiled and declined		N/A	–	–
Eligible electors / turnout		N/A	N/A	–
Liberal hold		Swing		N/A
Source(s) "By-elections". Elections Alberta.

=== 1911 by-election ===
Alberta provincial by-election, October 31, 1911 Upon the death of Archibald J. McArthur on June 5, 1911
Party	Candidate	Votes	%	±%
Conservative	Harold Riley	1,370	56.29%	–
Liberal	John Peter McArthur	1,064	43.71%	–
Total		2,434	–	–
Rejected, spoiled and declined		N/A	–	–
Eligible electors / turnout		N/A	N/A	–
Conservative gain from Liberal		Swing		N/A
Source(s) "By-elections". Elections Alberta.

=== 1913 ===
1913 Alberta general election
Party	Candidate	Votes	%	±%
Liberal	John Peter McArthur	641	52.67%	-5.16%
Conservative	George McElroy	576	47.33%	5.16%
Total		1,217	–	–
Rejected, spoiled and declined		N/A	–	–
Eligible electors / turnout		1,565	77.76%	3.39%
Liberal gain from Conservative		Swing		-5.16%
Source(s) Source: "Gleichen Official Results 1913 Alberta general election". Alberta Heritage Community Foundation.

=== 1917 ===
1917 Alberta general election
Party	Candidate	Votes	%	±%
Conservative	Fred Davis	762	42.76%	-4.57%
Liberal	John Peter McArthur	712	39.96%	-12.72%
Nonpartisan League	John W. Leedy	308	17.28%	–
Total		1,782	–	–
Rejected, spoiled and declined		N/A	–	–
Eligible electors / turnout		2,711	65.73%	-12.03%
Conservative gain from Liberal		Swing		-1.27%
Source(s) Source: "Gleichen Official Results 1917 Alberta general election". Alberta Heritage Community Foundation.

=== 1921 ===
1921 Alberta general election
Party	Candidate	Votes	%	±%
United Farmers	John C. Buckley	1,565	59.51%	–
Liberal	H. Scott	1,065	40.49%	0.54%
Total		2,630	–	–
Rejected, spoiled and declined		N/A	–	–
Eligible electors / turnout		3,708	70.93%	5.20%
United Farmers gain from Conservative		Swing		8.10%
Source(s) Source: "Gleichen Official Results 1921 Alberta general election". Alberta Heritage Community Foundation.

=== 1926 ===
1926 Alberta general election
Party	Candidate	Votes	%	±%
United Farmers	John C. Buckley	1,584	56.90%	-2.61%
Conservative	Hugh Miller	722	25.93%	–
Liberal	Frank Lount	478	17.17%	-23.32%
Total		2,784	–	–
Rejected, spoiled and declined		166	–	–
Eligible electors / turnout		4,428	66.62%	-4.31%
United Farmers hold		Swing		5.98%
Source(s) Source: "Gleichen Official Results 1926 Alberta general election". Alberta Heritage Community Foundation.

=== 1930 ===
1930 Alberta general election
Party	Candidate	Votes	%	±%
United Farmers	John C. Buckley	1,566	59.43%	2.53%
Independent	H. S. B. Chamberlain	1,069	40.57%	–
Total		2,635	–	–
Rejected, spoiled and declined		104	–	–
Eligible electors / turnout		4,074	67.23%	0.61%
United Farmers hold		Swing		-6.05%
Source(s) Source: "Gleichen Official Results 1930 Alberta general election". Alberta Heritage Community Foundation.

=== 1935 ===
1935 Alberta general election
Party	Candidate	Votes	%	±%
Social Credit	Isaac M. McCune	2,093	52.38%	–
United Farmers	John C. Buckley	895	22.40%	-37.03%
Liberal	V. S. Kimpton	569	14.24%	–
Conservative	T. S. Hughes	439	10.99%	–
Total		3,996	–	–
Rejected, spoiled and declined		141	–	–
Eligible electors / turnout		4,908	84.29%	17.06%
Social Credit gain from United Farmers		Swing		5.56%
Source(s) Source: "Gleichen Official Results 1935 Alberta general election". Alberta Heritage Community Foundation.

=== 1940 ===
1940 Alberta general election
Party	Candidate	Votes	%	±%
Independent	Donald J. McKinnon	2,255	51.46%	–
Social Credit	Isaac M. McCune	1,457	33.25%	-19.13%
Co-operative Commonwealth	J. H. Coldwell	670	15.29%	–
Total		4,382	–	–
Rejected, spoiled and declined		212	–	–
Eligible electors / turnout		6,112	75.16%	-9.13%
Independent gain from Social Credit		Swing		-5.88%
Source(s) Source: "Gleichen Official Results 1940 Alberta general election". Alberta Heritage Community Foundation.

=== 1944 ===
1944 Alberta general election
Party	Candidate	Votes	%	±%
Social Credit	George E. Bell	2,032	50.22%	16.97%
Independent	Donald J. McKinnon	1,072	26.50%	-24.97%
Co-operative Commonwealth	B. C. Henricks	942	23.28%	7.99%
Total		4,046	–	–
Rejected, spoiled and declined		111	–	–
Eligible electors / turnout		5,560	74.77%	-0.40%
Social Credit gain from Independent		Swing		2.76%
Source(s) Source: "Gleichen Official Results 1944 Alberta general election". Alberta Heritage Community Foundation.

=== 1948 ===
1948 Alberta general election
Party	Candidate	Votes	%	±%
Social Credit	George E. Bell	2,354	64.37%	14.15%
Independent	Jonathan M. Wheatley	1,303	35.63%	9.13%
Total		3,657	–	–
Rejected, spoiled and declined		221	–	–
Eligible electors / turnout		5,926	65.44%	-9.33%
Social Credit hold		Swing		2.51%
Source(s) Source: "Gleichen Official Results 1948 Alberta general election". Alberta Heritage Community Foundation.

=== 1952 ===
1952 Alberta general election
Party	Candidate	Votes	%	±%
Social Credit	George E. Bell	2,061	68.49%	4.12%
Liberal	Charles County	675	22.43%	–
Co-operative Commonwealth	Aubrey E. Gibson	273	9.07%	–
Total		3,009	–	–
Rejected, spoiled and declined		161	–	–
Eligible electors / turnout		5,192	61.06%	-4.38%
Social Credit hold		Swing		8.66%
Source(s) Source: "Gleichen Official Results 1952 Alberta general election". Alberta Heritage Community Foundation.

=== 1955 ===
1955 Alberta general election
Party	Candidate	Votes	%	±%
Social Credit	George E. Bell	1,912	51.73%	-16.76%
Liberal	Carman Ellis	1,784	48.27%	25.84%
Total		3,696	–	–
Rejected, spoiled and declined		202	–	–
Eligible electors / turnout		5,228	74.56%	13.50%
Social Credit hold		Swing		-21.30%
Source(s) Source: "Gleichen Official Results 1955 Alberta general election". Alberta Heritage Community Foundation.

=== 1959 ===
1959 Alberta general election
Party	Candidate	Votes	%	±%
Social Credit	George E. Bell	2,267	60.08%	8.35%
Progressive Conservative	A. John Van Wezel	754	19.98%	–
Liberal	Carman A. Parkyn	752	19.93%	-28.34%
Total		3,773	–	–
Rejected, spoiled and declined		9	–	–
Eligible electors / turnout		5,244	72.12%	-2.44%
Social Credit hold		Swing		18.32%
Source(s) Source: "Gleichen Official Results 1959 Alberta general election". Alberta Heritage Community Foundation.

== Plebiscite results ==
=== 1948 electrification plebiscite ===
District results from the first province wide plebiscite on electricity regulation.

Option A	Option B
Are you in favour of the generation and distribution of electricity being continued by the Power Companies?	Are you in favour of the generation and distribution of electricity being made a publicly owned utility administered by the Alberta Government Power Commission?
2,007 56.04%	1,574 43.96%
Province wide result: Option A passed.

=== 1957 liquor plebiscite ===
1957 Alberta liquor plebiscite results: Gleichen
Question A: Do you approve additional types of outlets for the sale of beer, wine and spirituous liquor subject to a local vote?
Ballot choice	Votes	%
Yes	1,440	61.02%
No	920	38.98%
Total votes	2,360	100%
Rejected, spoiled and declined	13	
4,885 eligible electors, turnout 48.58%
Question B1: Should mixed drinking be allowed in beer parlours in Calgary and the surrounding areas?
Ballot choice	Votes	%
Yes	5	100.00%
No	0	0.00%
Total votes	5	100%
Rejected, spoiled and declined	0	
19 eligible electors, turnout 26.32%

On October 30, 1957, a stand-alone plebiscite was held province wide in all 50 of the then current provincial electoral districts in Alberta. The government decided to consult Alberta voters to decide on liquor sales and mixed drinking after a divisive debate in the Legislature. The plebiscite was intended to deal with the growing demand for reforming antiquated liquor control laws.

The plebiscite was conducted in two parts. Question A asked in all districts, asked the voters if the sale of liquor should be expanded in Alberta, while Question B asked in a handful of districts within the corporate limits of Calgary and Edmonton asked if men and woman were allowed to drink together in establishments. Question B was slightly modified depending on which city the voters were in.

Province wide Question A of the plebiscite passed in 33 of the 50 districts while Question B passed in all five districts. Gleichen voted overwhelmingly in favour of the plebiscite. The district recorded about average voter turnout, being a couple points above the province wide 46% average.

Gleichen also voted on question B1 with just 19 residents lying inside the electoral district within the corporate limits of Calgary. Only five residents showed up to vote, they unanimously voted to allow mixed drinking.

Official district returns were released to the public on December 31, 1957. The Social Credit government in power at the time did not considered the results binding. However the results of the vote led the government to repeal all existing liquor legislation and introduce an entirely new Liquor Act.

Municipal districts lying inside electoral districts that voted against the Plebiscite were designated Local Option Zones by the Alberta Liquor Control Board and considered effective dry zones, business owners that wanted a licence had to petition for a binding municipal plebiscite in order to be granted a licence.

== By-election reasons ==
- December 7, 1906—Appointment of Mr. Charles Stuart to the Judicial Bench.
- October 3, 1910—Resignation Ezra Riley in protest against leadership of his party.
- October 31, 1911—Death of Mr. Archibald J. McArthur.

== See also ==
- List of Alberta provincial electoral districts
- Canadian provincial electoral districts
