= Fred Davis (politician) =

Canadian politician

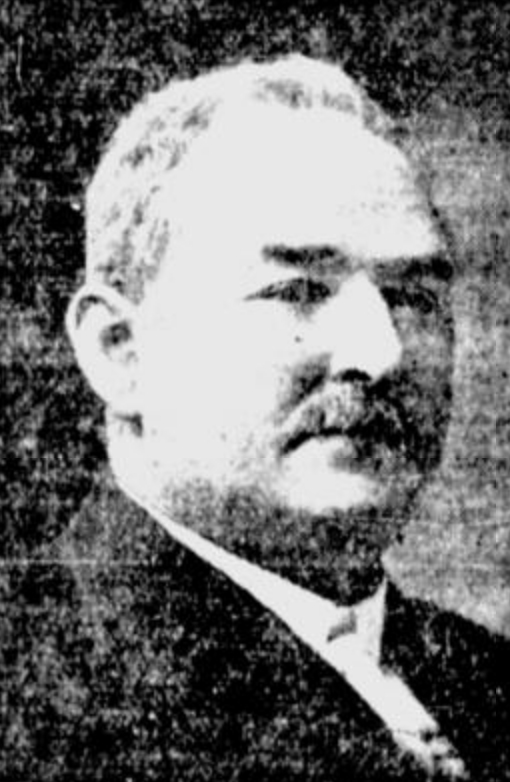
- Davis pictured in The Calgary Daily Herald, September 19, 1925

Member of the Canadian Parliament for Calgary East
- In office 1925–1926
- Preceded by: William Irvine
- Succeeded by: Herbert Bealey Adshead

Member of the Legislative Assembly of Alberta
- In office June 7, 1917 – July 18, 1921
- Preceded by: John Peter McArthur
- Succeeded by: John Buckley
- Constituency: Gleichen

Personal details
- Born: Alfred Thomas Davis; March 26, 1868 Mitchell, Ontario
- Died: July 24, 1945 (aged 77) Calgary, Alberta
- Party: Conservative
- Spouse: Margaret J. Davidson (1898–1914; her death)

Alfred Thomas "Fred" Davis (March 26, 1868 – July 24, 1945) was a farmer and a politician on the federal and provincial level in Canada. He was born in 1868 in Mitchell, Ontario to William J. Davis and Tabitha Worth. He married Margaret Davidson in 1898.

== Political career ==
Davis first began his political career as a municipal councilor in his home town of Mitchell, Ontario. He later became the town's mayor.

Davis ran for a seat in the Legislative Assembly of Alberta in the 1917 Alberta general election as a Conservative. He defeated Liberal incumbent John Peter McArthur and former Governor of Kansas John Leedy in a hotly contested election.

Davis served one term in the Alberta Legislature before retiring from provincial politics in 1921.

Davis ran for the House of Commons of Canada in the 1925 Canadian federal election. He defeated incumbent Member of Parliament William Irvine. Davis was defeated a year later by Herbert Adshead in the 1926 Canadian federal election.

He died in Calgary after a long illness in 1945 and was buried in his hometown of Mitchell, Ontario.

Legislative Assembly of Alberta
Preceded by John Peter McArthur	MLA Gleichen; 1917–1921	Succeeded by John Buckley
Parliament of Canada
Preceded by William Irvine	Member of Parliament Calgary East; 1925–1926	Succeeded by Herbert Bealey Adshead
