= John Buckley (Canadian politician) =

Canadian politician (1863-1942)

John Charles Buckley
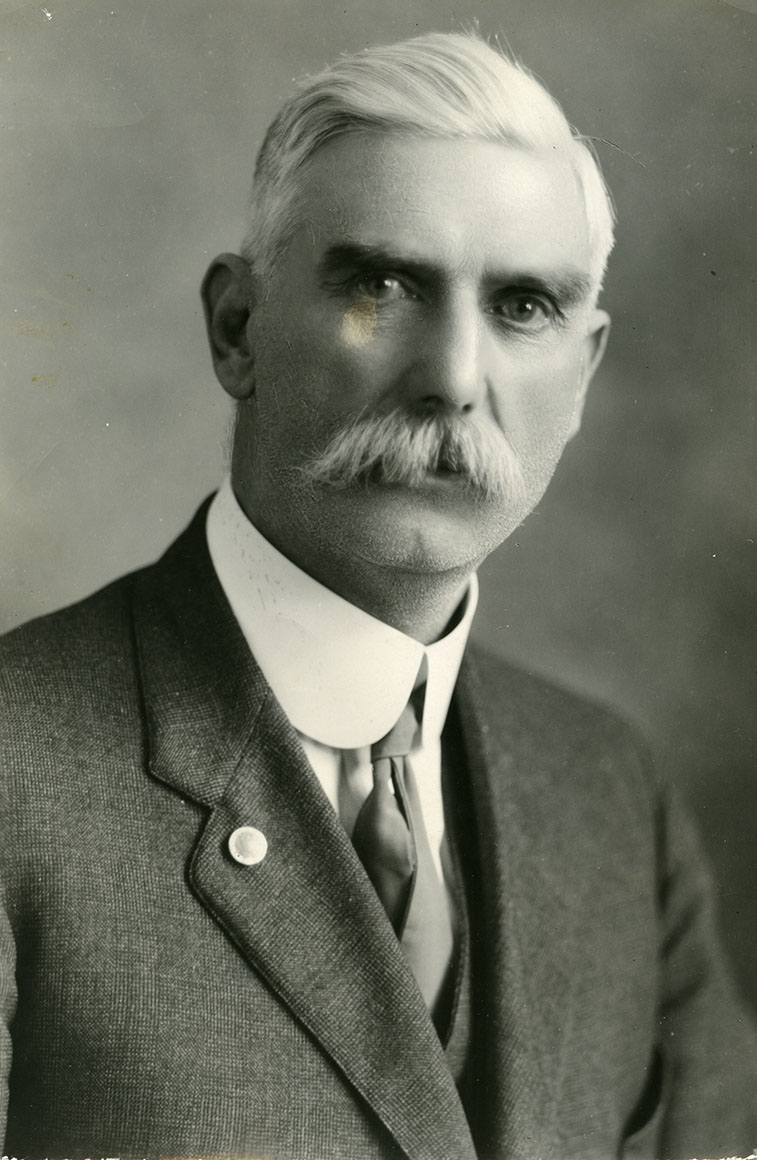

Member of the Legislative Assembly of Alberta
- In office July 18, 1921 – August 22, 1935
- Preceded by: Fred Davis
- Succeeded by: Isaac McCune
- Constituency: Gleichen

Personal details
- Born: November 26, 1863 Enniskerry, County Wicklow, Ireland
- Died: January 27, 1942 (aged 78) Gleichen, Alberta, Canada
- Party: United Farmers
- Occupation: politician

John Charles Buckley was a provincial politician from Alberta, Canada. He served as a member of the Legislative Assembly of Alberta from 1921 to 1935 sitting with the United Farmers caucus in government.

== Political career ==
Buckley ran for a seat to the Alberta Legislature in the 1921 Alberta general election as a United Farmers candidate in the electoral district of Gleichen. He defeated Liberal candidate H. Scott with a comfortable majority to pick up the open seat for his party.

Buckley ran for a second term in the 1926 Alberta general election. He increased his popular vote slightly easily winning the three-way race.

The 1930 Alberta general election would see Buckley defend his seat in a hotly contested battle against Independent candidate H.S.B. Chamberlain. He managed to hold his vote share and win his third term in office.

Buckley ran for a fourth term in office in the 1935 Alberta general election and finished a distant second place out of four candidates losing to Social Credit candidate Isaac McCune.
