= George E. Bell =

Canadian politician

Member of the Legislative Assembly of Alberta
- In office August 8, 1944 – June 17, 1963
- Preceded by: Donald McKinnon
- Succeeded by: District Abolished
- Constituency: Gleichen

Personal details
- Born: November 21, 1883
- Died: November 16, 1970 (aged 86)
- Party: Social Credit
- Occupation: politician

George Ernest Bell (November 21, 1883 – November 16, 1970) was a politician from Alberta, Canada. He served in the Legislative Assembly of Alberta from 1944 to 1963 as a member of the Social Credit Party.

== Political career ==
Bell first ran for a seat in the Alberta Legislature in the 1944 general election, as a Social Credit candidate in the electoral district of Gleichen. He defeated incumbent Donald McKinnon with just over half the popular vote.

In the 1948 general election he defeated independent candidate Jonathan Wheatley in a landslide majority.

The 1952 general election saw Bell re-elected in a three-way race.

In the 1955 general election he defeated Liberal candidate Carman Ellis by 128 votes.

Bell faced Ellis again in the 1959 general election and defeated him again in a landslide.

Bell retired from the Assembly at dissolution in 1963.
