= Isaac McCune =

Canadian politician

Isaac Melville McCune
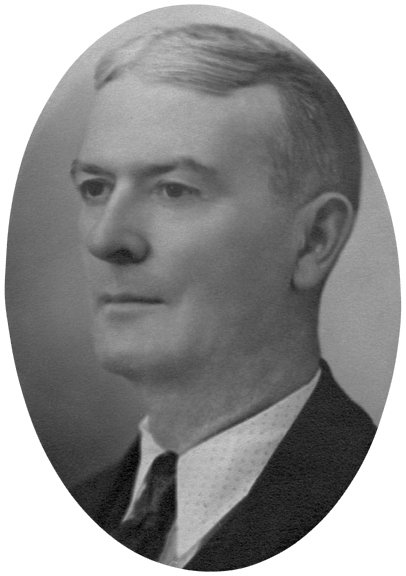

Member of the Legislative Assembly of Alberta
- In office August 22, 1935 – March 21, 1940
- Preceded by: John Buckley
- Succeeded by: Donald McKinnon
- Constituency: Gleichen

Personal details
- Born: August 27, 1884 McCune, Kansas, U.S.
- Died: October 15, 1959 (aged 75) Calgary, Alberta, Canada
- Party: Social Credit
- Occupation: politician

Isaac Melville McCune (August 27, 1884 – October 15, 1959) was a provincial politician from Alberta, Canada. He served as a member of the Legislative Assembly of Alberta from 1935 to 1940 sitting with the Social Credit caucus in government.

== Political career ==
McCune ran for a seat to the Alberta Legislature as a Social Credit candidate in the electoral district of Gleichen in the 1935 Alberta general election. He defeated incumbent John Buckley and two other candidates by a wide margin to pick up the seat for his party.

McCune ran for a second term in the 1940 Alberta general election. He was handily defeated by independent candidate Donald McKinnon finishing in second place out of three candidates.
