= William Henry Cushing =

Canadian politician (1852–1934)

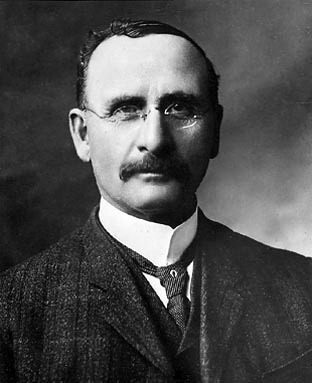
- Cushing in 1905

Member of the Legislative Assembly of Alberta
- In office November 9, 1905 – April 17, 1913 Serving with R. B. Bennett (1909–1913)
- Preceded by: New district
- Succeeded by: District abolished
- Constituency: Calgary

Alberta Minister of Public Works
- In office September 9, 1905 – February 16, 1910
- First Minister: Alexander Cameron Rutherford
- Preceded by: New position
- Succeeded by: Arthur Sifton

11th Mayor of Calgary
- In office January 2, 1900 – January 7, 1901
- Preceded by: James Reilly
- Succeeded by: James Stuart Mackie

Calgary Alderman
- In office January 6, 1902 – January 2, 1905
- In office May 1899 – January 2, 1900
- In office January 7, 1895 – January 4, 1897

Calgary Town Councillor
- In office January 20, 1890 – January 16, 1893

Personal details
- Born: August 21, 1852 Kenilworth, Ontario, Canada
- Died: January 25, 1934 (aged 81) Calgary, Alberta, Canada
- Resting place: Union Cemetery, Calgary
- Party: Liberal
- Occupation: Lumberman

William Henry Cushing (August 21, 1852 – January 25, 1934) was a Canadian politician. Born in Ontario, he migrated west as a young adult where he started a successful lumber company and later became Alberta's first Minister of Public Works and the 11th mayor of Calgary. As Minister of Public Works in the government of Alexander Cameron Rutherford, he oversaw the creation of Alberta Government Telephones.

Cushing's resignation in 1910 precipitated the Alberta and Great Waterways Railway scandal, which forced Rutherford's resignation. Though Cushing had hopes of being asked to replace Rutherford, that role fell instead to Arthur Sifton, the province's chief judge. Left out of Sifton's cabinet, Cushing did not seek re-election in the 1913 election, and did not re-enter politics thereafter. He was the chairman of Mount Royal College's board of governors for sixteen years. He died in 1934.

== Early life ==
Cushing was born August 21, 1852, in Kenilworth, Ontario, to William Cushing and Sarah Thomson. His father was a farmer who had immigrated from Norwich, England in 1840. In 1879, Cushing indentured as a carpenter. He moved to Calgary in 1883, where in partnership with Stephen Jarett, he engaged in carpentry, building houses and stores. In 1877 Cushing married Elizabeth Rinn, who died three years later. In 1883 he married Mary Jane Waters, with whom he had two children. In 1885 he opened a sash and door factory, which made him wealthy. His business flourished and expanded; by 1900, it occupied 42 city lots and employed more than one hundred workers; by 1911, this number had reached two hundred. He was also active in the local Methodist church and the Bowness golf club, and served eight years as a school trustee with the Calgary Board of Education. He was a supporter of the Temperance Movement.

== Municipal politics ==
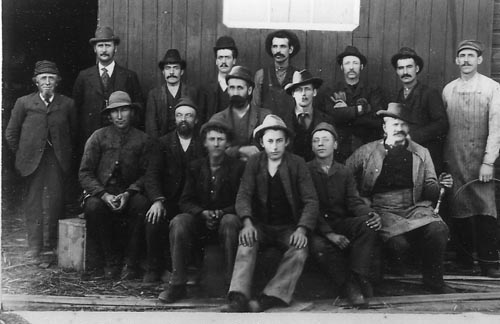
Cushing and the staff of his lumber mill, 1894

Cushing was elected Calgary town councillor for a term beginning on January 20, 1890. He remained in that capacity until January 16, 1893. Two years later he became an alderman on the council of Calgary, which was now a city. He served as alderman from January 7, 1895, until January 4, 1897, and again from May 1899 until January 2, 1900. During his last term he was elected the thirteenth mayor of Calgary, a position he held from January 2, 1900, until January 7, 1901. He subsequently served another term as alderman from January 6, 1902, until January 2, 1905.

He also served as the president of Calgary's Board of Trade in 1906.

== Provincial politics ==
After Alexander Cameron Rutherford was asked to form Alberta's first government in 1905, he appointed Cushing as his Minister of Public Works. Historian L. G. Thomas notes that this was an important portfolio, given the rapid development of infrastructure expected in the new province. In keeping with custom for cabinet ministers in Westminster parliamentary systems, Cushing ran for the first Legislative Assembly of Alberta in the district of Calgary in the 1905 election. Cushing, a Liberal, was opposed by Conservative leader R. B. Bennett. The campaign was acrimonious; at one meeting, Bennett accused Cushing of giving his fellow Liberal candidates road-building money with which they could bribe their districts. On election day, Cushing defeated Bennett, who attributed his defeat to "Roman Catholic influence".

Once elected, he was Calgary's primary supporter in the legislature's debate over Alberta's capital city, claiming that it was the new province's economic centre, that Alberta's status as a province was the result of a political movement that had begun in Calgary, and that it would be cheaper to build a legislature there than in Edmonton, site of the interim capital. His motion to name Calgary as the capital was defeated 16 votes to eight, and permanent capital was located at Edmonton. Though it was not to be at his preferred location, as Public Works Minister, Cushing chose the design for the new Alberta Legislature Building, which was based on the Minnesota State Capitol.

As Calgary's representative, Cushing was further dismayed when Rutherford elected to locate the University of Alberta in his own hometown of Strathcona, immediately across the North Saskatchewan River from Edmonton. Calgarians felt that, having been denied the capital, they should be first in line for the university.

As Public Works Minister, Cushing was a primary advocate of government intervention in the labour disputes plaguing Alberta's coal industry in 1907; Rutherford eventually appointed a commission to examine the problem. Cushing also presided over the government's entry into the telephone business: in 1906, most telephone lines in Alberta were privately owned, and the largest of these private owners was the Bell Telephone Company. Bell controlled all telephone service in Calgary, and refused to extend its operations into less densely populated, and therefore less profitable, regions of the province. In response, Cushing attacked Bell as "the most pernicious and iniquitous monopoly that had ever been foisted upon a people claiming to be free" and sponsored legislation creating Alberta Government Telephones to service areas that Bell would not. This new company later purchased Bell's lines and financed the venture by issuing debentures, in contrast to the government's usual policy of "pay as you go". Cushing's zeal for government involvement was such that member of the House of Commons of Canada Peter Talbot in 1908 warned Rutherford that his Public Works Minister was "going crazy" with public ownership and that Rutherford would "someday find a lot of trouble through him". Thomas argued that it was strange for a successful businessman like Cushing to be so aggressive rhetorically against a successful corporation, but Mount Royal College historian Patricia Roome has suggested that Cushing was soured by his own experience as a Calgarian living under the monopoly, was hostile to what he saw as a symbol of "eastern capitalism," and hoped that bringing telephone service to rural areas would guarantee continued Liberal success.

=== Railway scandal ===
By the 1909 Alberta general election, Calgary's growth had earned it a second seat in the legislature. Cushing finished first in a five-candidate field, and was elected to fill one of these seats; Bennett, finishing second, was elected to the other.

Though Cushing, as Minister of Public Works, was initially responsible for railway policy, on November 1, 1909, Rutherford created a new ministry of Railways, which he appointed himself to head. In February 1910, Cushing resigned as Minister of Public Works, expressing disagreement with Rutherford's policy of offering loan guarantees to private railway builders, including the Alberta and Great Waterways (A&GW) Railway. He stated in his letter of resignation that this policy had been adopted without his knowledge or consent. Rutherford accepted the resignation with regret, but publicly disagreed with Cushing's claim that he had been kept unaware of government railway policy. On February 25, Cushing gave his account of the events leading to his resignation In the legislature: after responsibility for railways was removed from his department, Rutherford had offered the A&GW guarantees of $20,000 per mile of railway constructed. In making this guarantee, Rutherford had not consulted government engineers in the department of Public Works about construction costs, relying instead on the A&GW's engineer. Cushing felt that guaranteeing $20,000 per mile, regardless of actual construction costs, was unwise, and further believed that the government's reliance on the A&GW's engineer could let the company get away with building a sub-standard railway.

There followed a dramatic series of legislative debates and votes, in which many Liberals, including Cushing, frequently voted against their own government, even on motions of non-confidence. In March, Rutherford invited Cushing to rejoin the cabinet; according to Cushing, he was assured that if he did so his rival, Attorney General Charles Wilson Cross, would resign. He declined Rutherford's offer, both because he considered that he was no longer able to work with the premier and because his allies among the anti-Rutherford Liberals urged him to fight on. Rumours began to circulate that Rutherford would resign, to be replaced by Cushing. Lieutenant Governor of Alberta George Bulyea was indeed convinced that Rutherford would have to resign in order to save the Liberals, but he and other powerful Liberals did not view Cushing as capable of leading the government. Bulyea instead invited provincial Chief Justice Arthur Sifton to form a government, though Cushing was reputed to have been "sitting in his hotel room, his ear glued to the telephone, waiting for the summons from the Lieutenant-Governor to assume the robes of Rutherford".

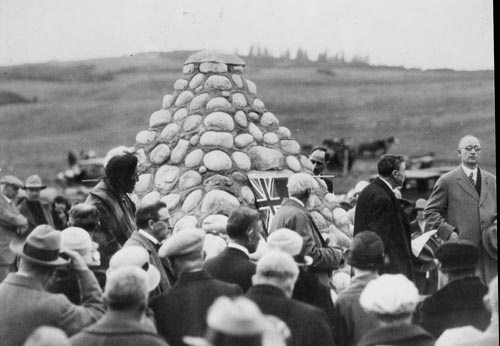
Cushing, far right, speaking at the unveiling of a memorial cairn at Morley, 1927

Sifton left Cushing, along with all other major figures of the A&GW dispute, out of his first cabinet; Ezra Riley, a staunch Cushing ally, resigned his seat in protest. Cushing did not do the same but did not seek re-election in the 1913 election.

== Later life and legacy ==
Cushing was the first chairman of the Mount Royal College board of governors, holding the post from 1910 until 1926, when he was designated honorary chairman. He died in Calgary January 25, 1934, of a heart attack. Calgary's W. H. Cushing Workplace School is named in his honour.

Cushing is primarily remembered for his role in the Alberta and Great Waterways Railway Scandal. In assessing his role in that episode, Thomas has suggested that his actions were motivated by something other than "revulsion against what appeared to be an unwise contract with a railway company". Instead, he believes that Cushing had concluded that he, rather than Rutherford, should be premier, and began to conduct himself publicly in such a way as to undermine Rutherford's authority. Whatever his motivations, Cushing's resignation precipitated a scandal that ended Alexander Rutherford's political career, and in so doing had a profound effect on Alberta's political history. In evaluating his legacy, Roome also considers his role in establishing the government telephone system, which in her opinion "produced serious financial difficulties" for the province in the years ahead.

== Electoral record ==
1909 Alberta general election results (Calgary) (two candidates elected)		Turnout N.A.	
Liberal	William Henry Cushing	2,579	27.18%
Progressive Conservative	R. B. Bennett	2,423	25.53%
Liberal	Dr. Egbert	1,933	20.37%
Progressive Conservative	Thomas Blow	1,907	20.10%
Socialist	George Howell	747	7.87%
1905 Alberta general election results (Calgary)		Turnout N.A.	
Liberal	William Henry Cushing	1,030	42.39%
Progressive Conservative	R. B. Bennett	993	40.86%
Independent	A. D. Macdonald	407	16.75%
