= Donald McKinnon (Canadian politician) =

Canadian politician (1901–1976)

Member of the Legislative Assembly of Alberta
- In office 1940–1944
- Preceded by: Isaac McCune
- Succeeded by: George E. Bell
- Constituency: Gleichen

Personal details
- Born: November 25, 1901 Langdon, Alberta
- Died: August 11, 1976 (aged 74) Alberta, Canada
- Party: None (Independent)

Donald James McKinnon (November 25, 1901 – August 11, 1976) was a provincial politician from Alberta, Canada. He served as a member of the Legislative Assembly of Alberta from 1940 to 1944, sitting as an Independent member from the constituency of Gleichen.
