= Archibald J. McArthur =

Canadian politician

Member of the Legislative Assembly of Alberta
- In office October 3, 1910 – June 5, 1911
- Preceded by: Ezra Riley
- Succeeded by: Harold Riley
- Constituency: Gleichen

Personal details
- Born: February 21, 1857 Iona, Scotland
- Died: June 5, 1911 (aged 54) Calgary, Alberta, Canada
- Party: Liberal
- Spouse: Catherine McCannel
- Children: two

Archibald John "A.J." McArthur (February 21, 1857 – June 5, 1911) was a Canadian politician.

== Early life ==
Archibald moved to Calgary in 1887. He was active in the community, founding the Calgary neighborhood (then village) of Crescent Heights. He served on the YMCA board of directors in Calgary, and became Deacon of the First Baptist Church.

Archibald used his community involvement to help win a bitter by-election for the Alberta Liberal Party on October 3, 1910, for the Gleichen seat in the 2nd Alberta Legislature against well known incumbent and Calgary rancher Ezra Riley. McArthur died just a year later, in 1911 vacating his seat in the Alberta Legislature. His brother John Peter McArthur ran for the Liberals in Archibald's place, and faced Ezra Riley's brother Harold Riley in the brothers by-election.
