= Harold William Hounsfield Riley =

Canadian politician

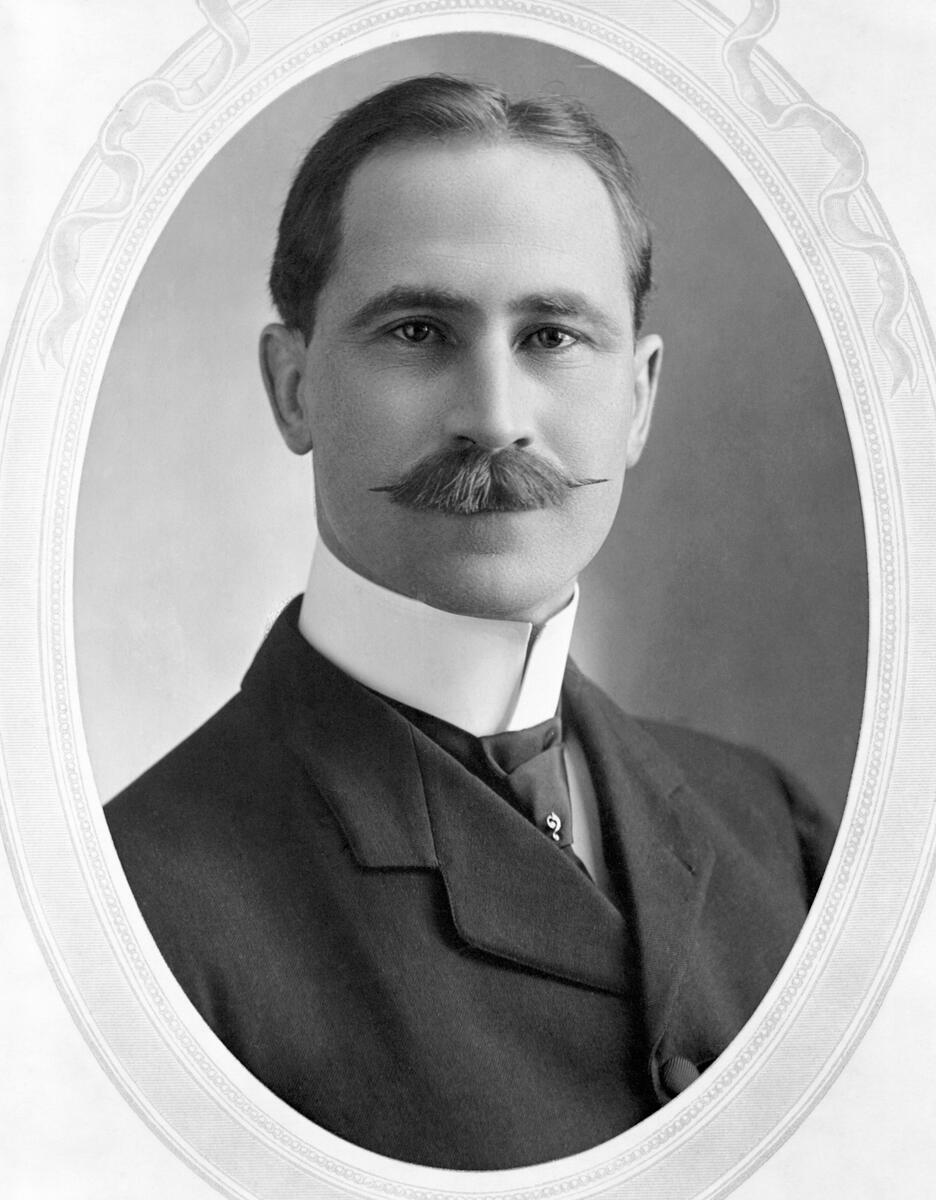

Member of the Legislative Assembly of Alberta
- In office 1911–1913
- Preceded by: Archibald J. McArthur
- Succeeded by: John Peter McArthur
- Constituency: Gleichen

Personal details
- Born: December 15, 1877 St. Lambert, Quebec, Canada
- Died: January 1, 1946 (aged 68) Calgary, Alberta, Canada
- Party: Conservative
- Spouse: Maude Keen
- Children: three

Harold William Hounsfield Riley Sr. (December 15, 1877 – January 1, 1946) was a member of the Legislative Assembly of Alberta, 1911-1913. He also served on Calgary city council 1914-1915 and 1932-1935.

He was born in St. Lambert, Quebec and his family moved to Calgary in 1888. in partnership with his brother E.J. Riley, he made money in the financial and real estate fields.

The two Riley brothers took turns with the McArthur brothers (candidates for the Liberal party) in representing Gleichen in the Alberta Legislature. Ezra Riley represented the Gleichen district from 1906 to 1910, then resigned but ran in the subsequent by-election, losing to Archibald J. McArthur. After the death of Archibald McArthur, H.W.H. Riley ran as a Conservative Party candidate against Liberal candidate John Peter McArthur, brother to the late Archibald McArthur. The October 31, 1911 by-election became known as the brothers by-election, as each candidate was a brother of a former Gleichen MLA. Riley won the by-election and served Gleichen until the 1913 election, when he ran in Bow Valley and was defeated by George Lane of the Liberal party.

He served on Calgary city council 1914-1915 and 1932-1935.

He was married to Maude Riley (née Keen) in 1907, who is best known for convincing the Calgary Police Force to hire women in 1913. They had three children; Harriet Maude (1909), Harold William Jr. and George Albert.

During World War I, he enlisted with the 137th Battalion.

After the war he helped found the Southern Alberta Pioneers' and Old Timers' Association, and he served as secretary from 1921 to 1943.

From 1926 to 1932 he was secretary-treasurer of the Calgary Stock Exchange.
