= Shouldice Hernia Centre =

Shouldice Hospital

Geography
- Location: 7750 Bayview Avenue, Markham, Ontario, Canada
- Coordinates: 43°49′14″N 79°24′12″W

Organization
- Care system: Publicly funded, privately administered; Ontario Health Insurance Plan
- Type: Specialist

Services
- Standards: Ministry of Health; Private Hospitals Act
- Emergency department: No
- Beds: 89
- Speciality: Hernia repair

History
- Founded: 1945

Links
- Website: shouldice.com
- Lists: Hospitals in Canada

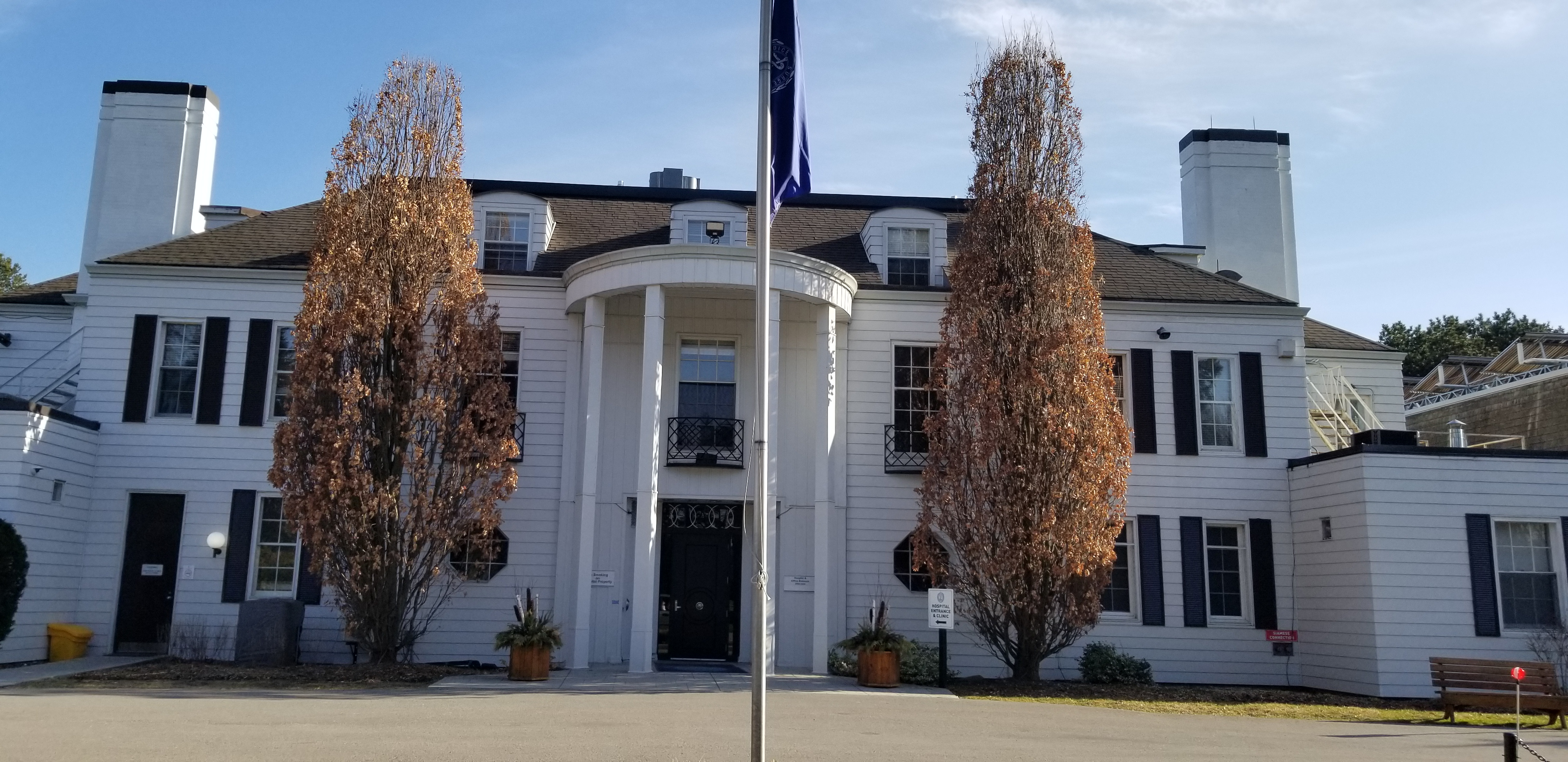
The main building of the Shouldice Hernia Centre in Markham, Ontario.

Shouldice Hospital (formerly Shouldice Hernia Centre) is a hospital located in Markham, Ontario, Canada, at 7750 Bayview Avenue in the Thornhill district. The hospital specializes in hernia care. Its location is the former estate of George McCullagh, a publisher who created The Globe and Mail newspaper in 1936.

== History ==
The hospital was founded in 1945 by Dr. Earle Shouldice. While private hospitals are not allowed under Ontario's Private Hospitals Act, Shouldice Hospital is one of seven private hospitals in the province grandfathered under the Act. The hospital has been continuously family run from its inception but is partially publicly funded.

In the 2020s, Liberty Development planned to build five residential towers on the property. In September 2022, the City of Markham purchased the Shouldice property for CA$188 million, to transform the lands into a public park, while continuing the lease for the hospital.

== Work ==
Shouldice Hospital is a private hospital that operates in a public health care system. It works solely on hernia repair. It uses a natural tissue, tension free, technique developed during the Second World War by Dr. Shouldice. The hospital performs hernia repairs on over 6,500 patients a year.

Everything in the hospital is designed toward hernia repair. Shouldice's rooms do not have telephones or televisions, which it says is to encourage patients to walk around while recovering. The hospital is laid out like a "country club." According to the hospital, it has the lowest rate of complications and recurrences of hernias in the world. The success of its method has been cited to the fact that Shouldice surgeons solely do hernia operations.

Notable patients at the hospital have included U.S. politician Rand Paul, former Canadian prime minister Joe Clark, former leader of the New Democratic Party (NDP) Jack Layton and consumer advocate Ralph Nader.

== Harvard Business School business case ==
The facility was the subject of a 1983 business case by the Harvard Business School. Written by James Heskett, the report is the school's fourth-best-selling business case, selling over 259,000 copies. The case study focuses on Shouldice's unique three-day hernia repair process. The popularity of the business case is responsible for the hospital's process becoming known outside of Canada.
