= Alberta and Great Waterways Railway scandal =

1910 political scandal in Alberta, Canada

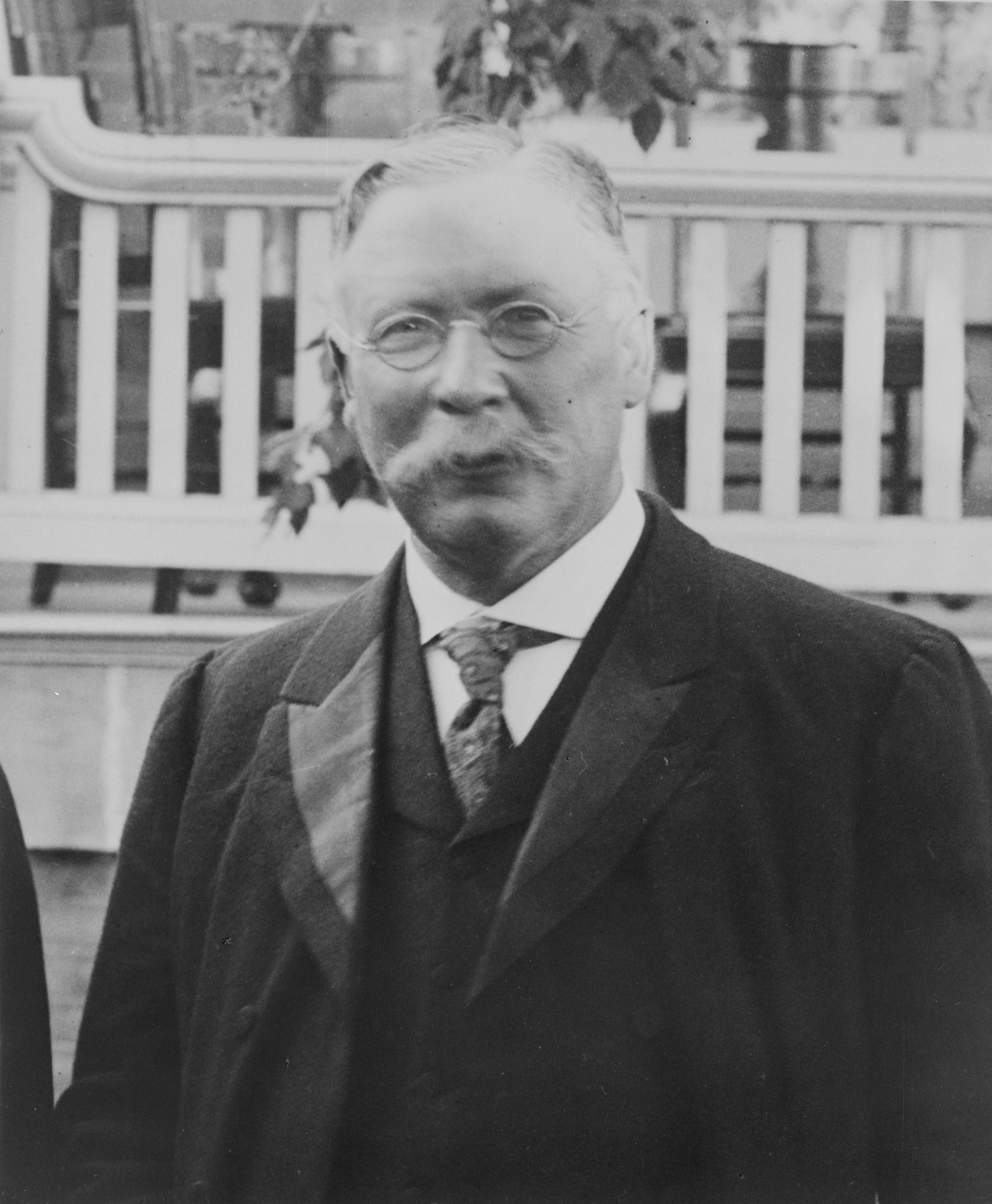
Alexander Cameron Rutherford was a popular premier who enjoyed the support of his party before the scandal broke.

The Alberta and Great Waterways Railway Scandal was a political scandal in Alberta, Canada in 1910, which caused the resignation of Liberal premier Alexander Cameron Rutherford. Rutherford and his government were accused of giving loan guarantees to private interests for the construction of the Alberta and Great Waterways (A&GW) Railway that substantially exceeded the cost of construction, and which paid interest considerably above the market rate. They were also accused of exercising insufficient oversight over the railway's operations.

The scandal split the Liberal Party: Rutherford's Minister of Public Works, William Henry Cushing, resigned from the government and publicly attacked its railway policy, and a large portion of the Liberal caucus voted to defeat the government in the Legislative Assembly of Alberta. The government survived all of these votes. Rutherford largely placated the legislature by appointing a royal commission to investigate the affair, but pressure from Lieutenant-Governor George Bulyea and unrest within his own caucus forced Rutherford's resignation and his replacement by Arthur Sifton.

The royal commission gave its report months after Rutherford resigned. The majority on the commission did not find Rutherford or his cabinet guilty of any wrongdoing, but criticized them for poor judgment, both in relation to the loan guarantees and in relation to the exemptions the A&GW received from provincial legislation. A minority report was more sympathetic, and declared the allegations against them "disproved".

James Cornwall, a Liberal backbencher who supported Rutherford, fared somewhat worse: his personal financial involvement in the railway gave rise to "suspicious circumstances", but he too was not proven guilty of any wrongdoing.

Besides provoking Rutherford's resignation, the scandal opened rifts in the Liberal Party that took years to heal. Sifton eventually smoothed over most of these divisions, but was frustrated in his railway policy by legal defeats. He ultimately adopted a similar policy to Rutherford's, and the A&GW was eventually built by private interests using the money raised from provincial loan guarantees. Sifton's Liberals went on to be re-elected in 1913 and 1917.

== Background ==
Alberta's first years as a province were optimistic ones. This optimism manifested itself in a desire for railroads. The public, media, and politicians all called for the rapid development of new lines and expansion of existing ones. Rutherford's Liberals had set up a framework that allowed almost anybody to enter the railroad business, but few firms had done so by 1909. The opposition Conservatives called for the government's direct entry into the industry. Rutherford's government instead opted for a regime of loan guarantees: the Grand Trunk Pacific Railway and the Canadian Northern Railway (CNR) had their bonds, which were to pay 4% per year over their thirty-year term, guaranteed at a rate of $13,000 per mile of railway constructed. The legislature had the right to increase this to $15,000. In exchange, the railways were subject to a minimum rate of line construction: the CNR was required to build 125 miles (201 km) and the Grand Trunk Railway 50 miles (80 km) before the end of 1909.

Besides the established companies, guarantees were also offered to new companies. One company to take advantage of this was the Alberta and Great Waterways Railway, which was founded by two Kansas City bankers, William R. Clarke and Bertrand R. Clarke, and a Winnipeg accountant, William Bain. The company proposed to build a "line from Edmonton north-easterly to a point at or near the west end of Lac la Biche, thence to a point at or near Fort McMurray." Guarantees to the A&GW were more generous than to the established companies: $20,000 per mile for 350 miles (560 km) and $400,000 for its Edmonton terminal. The bonds also paid better interest (5%) over a longer term (fifty years) than those of the established companies. Upon the bonds' sale, the money was to be placed in a bank account controlled by the government, and paid to the railway as the line was constructed.

== The scandal ==
The Rutherford government had just been resoundingly re-elected in the 1909 provincial election, winning 36 of the legislature's 41 seats, when the new legislature first met in February 1910. There was initially no sign of controversy in relation to the A&GW Railway: William Clarke, A&GW President, had several months earlier announced that the line would be completed by the end of 1912, ahead of schedule. When the A&GW bonds went on sale in London in November 1909, the issue was oversubscribed. The following month, the contract for ties was awarded. Everything seemed to be progressing as planned when, at the beginning of the new legislative session, Liberal backbencher John R. Boyle asked the government a series of innocuous questions about the company and the guarantees made to it. Rutherford, Minister of Railways as well as Premier, responded to the questions in writing. Before he did so, however, a rumour began to circulate that William Henry Cushing, Minister of Public Works, had resigned from the cabinet.

Boyle and Conservative leader R. B. Bennett questioned Rutherford about the rumours, but Rutherford initially refused to make any announcement. The next day, however, the rumour was confirmed when the Premier read Cushing's letter of resignation in the legislature. In this letter, Cushing gave his reasons for resigning as disagreement with the government's railway policy, which he claimed was developed without his involvement or consent. Rutherford disagreed with this claim, and expressed his regret for Cushing's resignation.

=== J. R. Boyle's resolution ===
On February 21, Boyle gave notice of a resolution to expropriate the rights of the A&GW and build the line directly. He asserted that the government had guaranteed to the A&GW more than was necessary, as a line of 230 miles (370 km), barely two thirds what had been guaranteed, was sufficient. The next day, Boyle further alleged that Deputy Attorney-General S. B. Woods had tampered with the government's files on the A&GW before Boyle and Bennett had viewed them. Attorney-General Charles Wilson Cross strongly disputed this allegation.

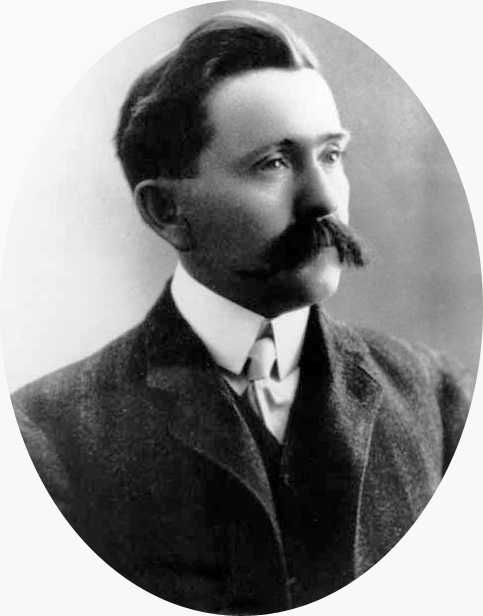
John R. Boyle took an early stand against his own leader and tried to bring down Rutherford's government over the scandal.

Debate on Boyle's resolution began February 25, in front of a full public gallery. Cushing opened debate. He explained that the cabinet's original intention had been for $20,000 per mile to be the maximum guarantee, with less promised for more easily built portions of the line. He claimed that he had taken ill at a time that this understanding was still in place, only to have Rutherford move responsibility for railways from Cushing's Public Works department to a new Railways department, headed by Rutherford himself. He recounted his discomfort with Rutherford's refusal to consult with Public Works engineers on the actual costs of constructing the line, and his relief at Rutherford's assurance that Cushing himself would be consulted. He claimed that Rutherford had not followed-through on this pledge, and that, upon seeing the completed agreement between the A&GW and the government, Cushing had decided to resign. Rutherford disputed this version of events, noted that Cushing had been at all relevant cabinet meetings, and cited the report of government engineer R. W. Jones in disputing that the line could be constructed for less than $20,000 per mile.

Boyle followed, alleging that Rutherford had privately committed the government to the $20,000 figure as early as November 14, 1908, before a government engineer had even been appointed. He also accused the government of negligence in failing to verify the paid in capital of the A&GW before committing $7.4 million of government loan guarantees to it. He closed by repeating his demand that the government expropriate the company's rights and build the line itself. Cross rebutted for the government, questioning Cushing's sincerity and quoting a March 1909 speech in which the then-Minister of Public Works had defended the government's railway policy against Bennett's attacks. Cross also reminded the legislature that no money was to be paid to the A&GW until tracks were actually constructed.

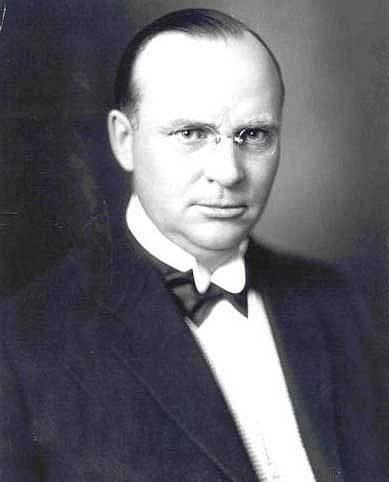
R. B. Bennett led the tiny Conservative opposition during the scandal.

On February 28 Liberal MLA Ezra Riley, a leader of the anti-Rutherford insurgency and a supporter of Cushing, proposed an amendment to Boyle's resolution, striking out the proposals to expropriate and substituting a statement that "the contract and agreement entered into between the Government and the Alberta and Great Waterways Railway Company are not such as to commend them to the judgment and confidence of this house". The same day, an amendment to this amendment was moved by Liberal MLA John William Woolf (Cardston) and seconded by Edmonton Liberal MLA John Alexander McDougall. Woolf and McDougall proposed redrafting the agreement along the lines proposed by A&GW President Clarke in a letter to Rutherford. This letter suggested that the A&GW should offer to the government its construction equipment and other assets in guarantee of its construction pledges.

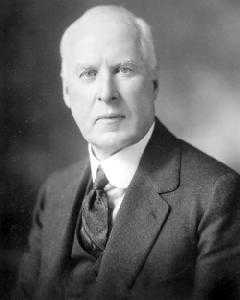
Though John Alexander McDougall seconded an amendment considered friendly to the government, he would prove not to be its ally.

The Woolf-McDougall amendment was considered friendly to the government, but Rutherford was not yet in the clear. Independent Edward Michener attacked the government for receiving only par value for the bonds when they had been sold at ten percent above par. McDougall voiced his support for Michener's argument. Though McDougall had seconded Woolf's pro-government amendment, his reasons for doing so were less support for the government than a principled aversion to the province using its law-making power to extricate itself from inconvenient contracts.

Opposition to the government came to a head March 2 when Conservative leader and Calgary MLA R.B. Bennett spoke. Bennett was renowned as one of the province's finest orators, and the five-hour speech he gave on this occasion earned plaudits. The Liberal Edmonton Bulletin praised its "splendor in diction [and] the physical endurance of the orator" and called it a "high water mark for parliamentary debate in Alberta". Bennett lashed out at the government's handling of the A&GW file, accusing it of culpable negligence in failing to properly oversee the company's activities. He claimed to have been approached directly by "great financial interests" intent on preventing his participation in the debate. He argued that the discrepancy in the sale price of the bonds and what the government had received for them meant that Clarke and his associates had realized a profit of between $200,000 and $300,000 at the government's expense. He closed with an accusation that Cross had sent an emissary to a telephone company that wanted to install an automatic telephone system in Calgary agreeing to reverse his opposition to the deal in exchange for a $12,000 contribution to Cross's campaign fund. These charges, corroborated by Cushing but hotly denied by Cross, were not related to the A&GW affair but were designed to damage the credibility of the government's de facto house leader on the eve of the vote on the Woolf-McDougall amendment.

The government side adopted similar tactics: Agriculture Minister Duncan Marshall accused Boyle of being motivated by bitterness over having been denied the solicitorship of the A&GW; Boyle admitted that he had applied for this position but denied an accusation by Peace River MLA James Cornwall that he had requested Cornwall's assistance in lobbying for it.

The Woolf-McDougall amendment came to a vote the evening of March 3. In a victory for the government, the amendment passed twenty-three votes to fifteen. In addition to Michener and the legislature's two Conservatives, the amendment was opposed by twelve of the legislature's thirty-seven Liberals, including Cushing. Charles M. O'Brien, the legislature's lone Socialist representative, voted with the government.

=== Cabinet confusion ===
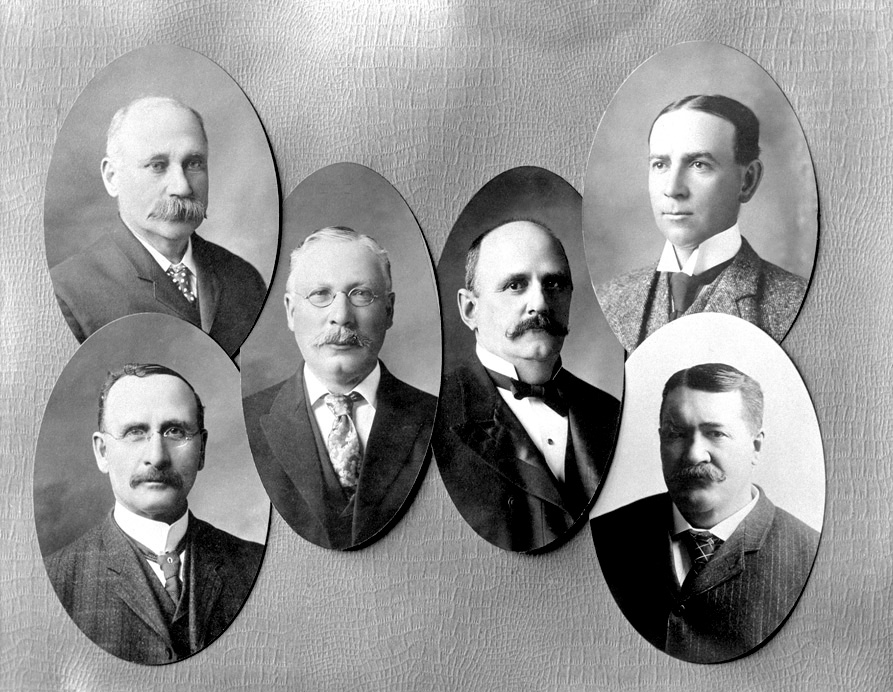
William Henry Cushing (bottom left) and Charles Wilson Cross (top right), though both Liberal members of the provincial cabinet, found themselves on opposite sides of the Alberta and Great Waterways debate.

On March 9, Cross suddenly resigned. His resignation was quickly followed by that of Woods, his deputy. The next day William Ashbury Buchanan, Minister without Portfolio, did the same; though he had voted on the government's side on the Woolf-McDougall motion, he harboured considerable doubts about the government's railway policy. Rumours circulated that Agriculture Minister Marshall and Minister without Portfolio Prosper-Edmond Lessard had also resigned, though these proved false. Buchanan, Marshall, Lessard, and Rutherford made no comment on the situation to either the press or the legislature, but Cross was more forthcoming: he said that Rutherford had told him that Cushing had been asked to re-enter cabinet and had accepted, leading Cross to conclude that, in light of his public conflict with Cushing, he "could not, under the circumstances, remain a member of the Alberta government." (Woods, who as a deputy minister did not sit in the legislature, denied that his resignation had any political motivation at all; he said that he had received an employment offer carrying three times his current salary.)

Cushing also made public statements and, as usual, his were not in line with Cross's. While acknowledging that Rutherford had invited him to rejoin the cabinet, he claimed that the Premier had offered Cross's resignation as one of the terms for Cushing's re-entry. He further denied that he had ever accepted Rutherford's offer, both because of persisting conflict between him and the Premier and because his re-entry was unanimously opposed by his fellow dissident Liberals. He directly accused Cross of having fabricated his claim that Rutherford had told him that Cushing had agreed to re-enter cabinet.

Rutherford held his silence until March 11, when he told the legislature that he had not accepted any resignations. He said that the only vacant cabinet post was the ministry of Public Works previously held by Cushing, and that he hoped to fill it soon. In the meantime, he intended to continue governing. While he eventually acknowledged Buchanan's resignation March 14, Cross remained in cabinet.

=== Further manoeuvring in the legislature ===
Following the passage of the Woolf-McDougall motion, the government took the offensive. On March 9, Rutherford gave notice of a resolution to strike a provincial railway board, with a membership of Rutherford, Deputy Public Works Minister John Stocks, and provincial railway engineer R. W. Jones. The board would have the power to discharge any government responsibility under the Alberta Railway Act. Stocks, however, publicly repudiated the resolution, and announced that he would have nothing to do with it.

On March 11, government supporter Charles Stewart attempted to disclose a scandalous rumour about Boyle in the legislature, but was ruled out of order by Speaker Charles W. Fisher. The allegation was quickly printed in the Edmonton Bulletin instead: Boyle, who expected to be named Attorney-General in the event that Cushing formed a government, was accused of approaching Lucien Boudreau and Robert L. Shaw, two government supporters who were hoteliers in their extra-legislative careers, and offering them immunity from prosecution for liquor license violations in exchange for their support of the insurgency.

That same day, Riley and Boyle moved a motion of no confidence in the government. It was defeated by a margin of twenty to seventeen. Ominously for Rutherford, two hitherto loyal Liberals, Buchanan and Henry William McKenney, switched their support to the rebels. More favourably, the ill member for Macleod, Colin Genge, was rumoured to be recovering from his illness and soon on his way to Edmonton, where he was expected to support the government (Genge would die without ever taking his seat). The government was also encouraged by the motion of dissident George P. Smith to strike an apolitical commission to supervise the construction of the A&GW, since it corresponded closely to its own proposal to appoint a royal commission.

Rutherford gave notice of a resolution to strike this royal commission, to be composed of three judges of the provincial supreme court, March 14. After one final attempt by the rebels to defeat the government legislatively (which failed by three votes), the resolution to strike the royal commission passed the legislature unanimously the next day. The Alberta and Great Waterways Railway scandal was, for the time being, out of the legislature's hands.

== Aftermath ==
=== The commission's inquiry ===
The commission first met in Edmonton March 29. The three commissioners—Justices David Lynch Scott, Horace Harvey, and Nicholas Beck—were joined by counsel for the insurgents (including Bennett himself), Cross, Rutherford, the A&GW, and Cornwall (who had been accused of using his involvement with the Athabasca Railway for personal benefit during the scandal). The evidence they heard was reported in great detail by Alberta's press, to the initial interest of the public. Before long, however, the details grew tedious, and the public became less engaged.

The greatest surprise to emerge during the commission's inquiry did not come from one of the forty-six witnesses to testify, but from one who did not: A&GW President Clarke moved back to the United States, and did not return for his scheduled testimony. While this disappearance did not prove the government's guilt, in the eyes of the press it did prove Clarke's. As the Edmonton Journal put it, the only question left to answer was "were the members of the government simple innocents whom Clarke worked through their credulity or were they in on it with him?"

=== George Bulyea's role ===
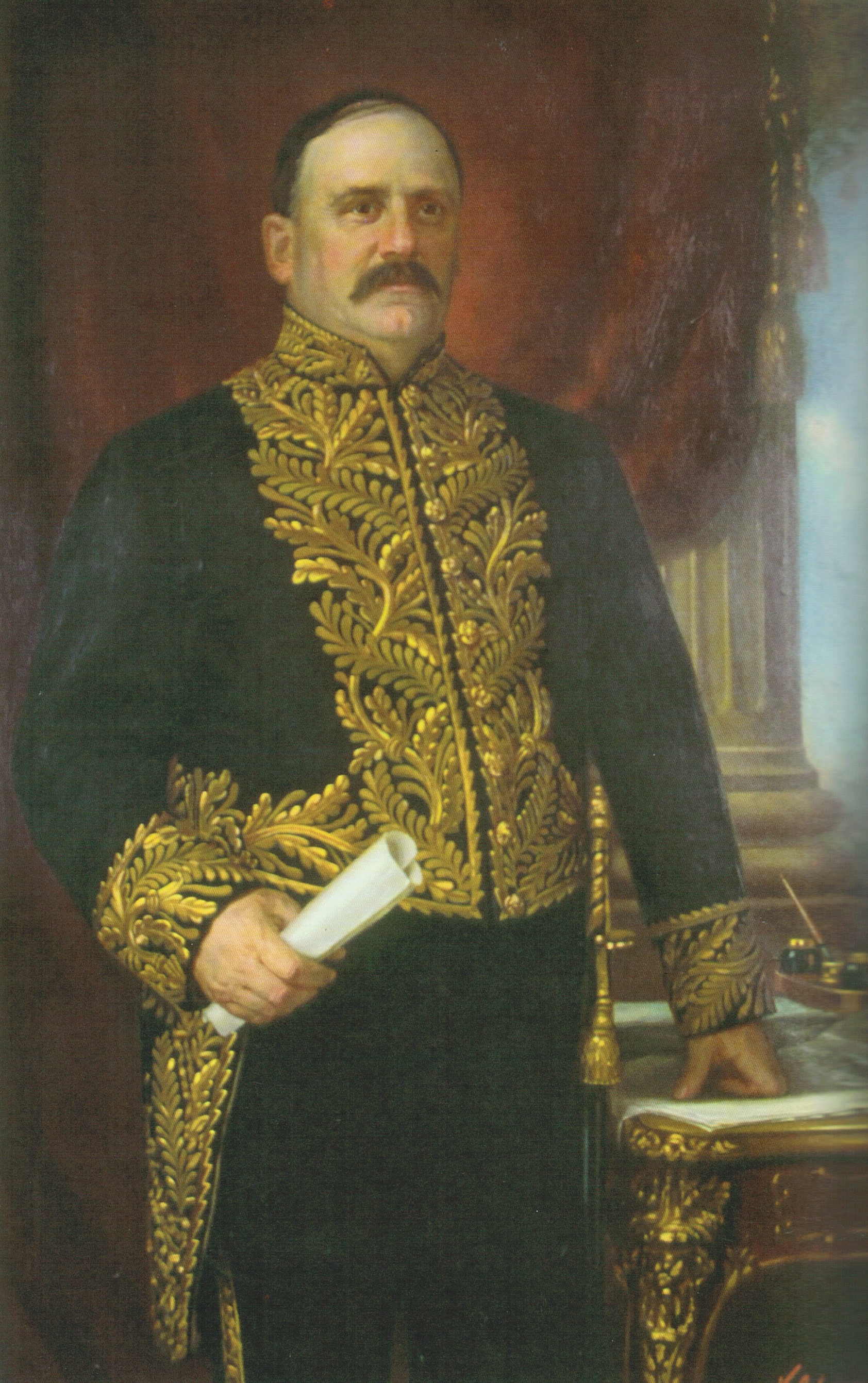
Although he had appointed him Premier in 1905, George Bulyea was not an admirer of Rutherford's.

Although it was George Bulyea, Alberta's first lieutenant governor, who had invited Rutherford to form the province's first government in 1905, the Premier never fully enjoyed Bulyea's confidence. Bulyea preferred several other candidates to Rutherford, including federal Member of Parliament (MP) Peter Talbot, but when these proved unwilling he acquiesced with Rutherford, the choice of Alberta Liberals. Now, with Rutherford reeling, Bulyea saw his initial doubts validated and began the search for potential successors.

The obvious choice was Cushing, but Bulyea felt little enthusiasm for him, doubting his political acumen (in this opinion he was supported by other Liberal Party luminaries, including Frank Oliver, federal Minister of the Interior and proprietor of the Bulletin). He continued to prefer Talbot, but found that the insurgent Liberals, who favoured Cushing, would not accept him. Oliver was also a possibility, but he had no interest in leaving Ottawa.

Talbot suggested Arthur Sifton, the province's chief justice. Sifton was a Liberal, but as a judge he was remote from political mudslinging. However, he had been offered the office of Premier in 1905, when it had seemed more desirable than it did now; would he have any interest? The question was answered May 26, when the legislature reconvened. Bulyea entered the house and announced that he had accepted Rutherford's resignation and that he had asked Sifton to form a government. Sifton had accepted.

The arrangement had nearly fallen apart at the last moment; MLAs loyal to Cross indicated on May 25 that they would accept Sifton only if Cross remained the Attorney-General, which Sifton refused. It appeared for a time that Rutherford would not resign; after considering the matter overnight, Bulyea decided the morning of May 26 that he was in a position to force the Premier's hand, but it proved unnecessary when Rutherford stepped down of his own volition.

=== The commission's report ===
The commission reported to the legislature November 10, 1910. Its findings were split into two reports: a majority report from Justices Scott and Harvey, and a minority report from Justice Beck.

The majority report traced the origins of the A&GW scandal to 1905, when a number of Albertans, including James Cornwall, were federally incorporated as the Athabasca Railway Company, chartered to construct a railway from Edmonton to Fort McMurray. The legal work for the incorporation had been done by the law firm of Charles Wilson Cross, Cornwall's close friend and personal solicitor. In October 1906 Cornwall sold the ARC's charter to a syndicate of Winnipegers for $2,500 and a one-sixth share in the syndicate. The syndicate costed out the construction of the railway, and found that cost per mile would be $13,700 from Edmonton to Lac la Biche, and one thousand dollars per mile more from Lac la Biche to Fort McMurray. It decided to undertake the venture if it could get a loan guarantee of $13,000 per mile from the Alberta government.

At the end of 1906, syndicate members visited Alberta, where Cornwall introduced them to members of the cabinet. Negotiations between the syndicate and the government continued for several years. During this time, new construction estimates prepared by the syndicate placed the cost of the railway at between eighteen and twenty thousand dollars per mile. February 2, 1907, Cornwall entered into an agreement with the syndicate whereby he would receive $544,000 in stock in the resulting railway company if he could secure the necessary loan guarantees; this amount was later changed to $100,000.

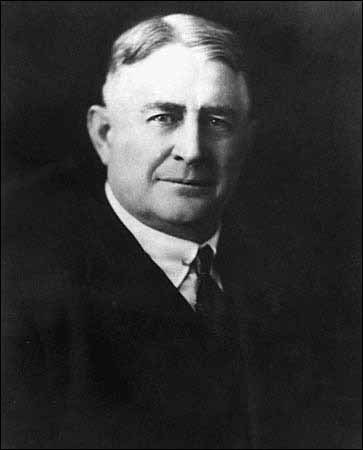
James Cornwall was not formally found guilty of wrongdoing, but a shadow continued to hang over him.

At the beginning of 1908, Clarke appeared on the scene, and eventually acquired the syndicate's full interest in the railway, including a purchase of Cornwall's interest for $14,500 (of an agreed-upon $25,000). Shortly thereafter, Clarke met with members of cabinet in Calgary; Cushing asserted that he had not been present for this meeting, while Rutherford insisted that he had been. While no formal guarantee was made at this meeting, Clarke left it confident that he would receive the necessary loan guarantee, and proceeded with construction plans. He obtained new cost estimates for the railroad of $27,000 per mile, though Clarke's engineer confidentially advised him that it could be built for half this amount. By November 14, 1908, the cabinet, led by Rutherford and Cross, had agreed to the $20,000 per mile guarantee. The majority report was critical of Rutherford and Cross for this, and also for setting the bonds' interest rate at 5 percent rather than 4 percent. The stated reason for this discrepancy was that the proposed railroad was likely to be difficult and expensive to build, crossing hundreds of miles of wilderness; in response, the report pointed out that the provincial guarantee of $20,000 per mile took this difficulty into account, and that there was thus no need for a higher interest rate to lure investors.

The majority report also took a dim view of the exemptions from the province's railway legislation that were built into the A&GW's charter: unlike the province's other railways, the A&GW was not required to have directors resident in Alberta and was exempt from the requirement that railway companies not commence business until 25% of their capital was subscribed and 10% paid up. The A&GW was held to a figure of less than 1% for both, and even this requirement was met in an unusual manner: Clarke brought his personal account into overdraft to issue a $50,000 cheque to the company, thereby allowing the latter to meet its capital requirements and commence operations. The company then authorized a payment of the same amount to Clarke on account of expenses incurred by him on behalf of the company; he used this payment to clear his overdraft.

The majority declined to find Rutherford and Cross guilty of any wrongdoing beyond poor judgment, though its findings were hardly flattering: "As there is room for doubt that the inference of personal interest is the only reasonable inference to be drawn from the circumstances related, and in view of the positive denial, it can only be said that, in the opinion of your commissioners, the evidence does not warrant the finding that there was or is any personal interest on the part of Dr. Rutherford or Mr. Cross". Its findings with regards to Cornwall were similar: his receipt of $14,500 and his expectation of $10,500 more constituted "suspicious circumstances", but these "point to no definite conclusion; and he has denied that he received any other benefit, or was interested in any other way in the enterprise, and it must be held that the evidence does not establish the contrary."

Justice Beck's minority report was more sympathetic to all three men. Beck declared himself perfectly satisfied that Cushing, despite his protestations to the contrary, had been aware of all details of the negotiations. While acknowledging that "in some instances the wisdom of their course may be doubtful", he accepted Rutherford's and Cross's explanations for their actions and labelled the accusations against them "disproved". He felt similarly about Cornwall, concluding that by the time he was using his position to advocate for the construction of the A&GW, he was free of any pecuniary interest in it.

=== Long-term effects ===
Sifton was selected Premier in an effort to restore party unity, and his first cabinet reflected that. There were three ministers in addition to Sifton. Charles R. Mitchell had been, like Sifton, a judge during the scandal, and was therefore unattached to either side. Duncan Marshall had been a Rutherford cabinet minister, but not one identified strongly with its railway policy. Archibald J. McLean had voted with the rebels, but not been a leader among them. The cabinet thus included members of both factions, but none of those who inspired such strong opinions as to be overly divisive.

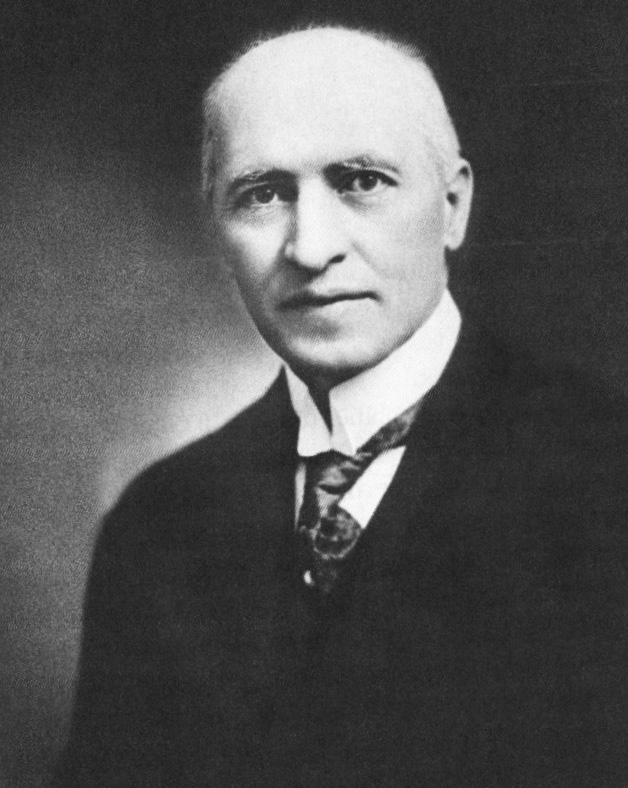
Arthur Sifton's ascendancy to the premiership was intended to provide a break from Rutherford's scandal-ridden government and smooth over divisions within the Liberal Party.

In late 1910, the new government introduced legislation to revoke the A&GW's charter and confiscate the proceeds from the sale of bonds, which were still held by the province. In introducing the bill, Sifton made no commitment as to what would be done with the funds once confiscated. Many northern MLAs, including Cornwall and Cross, suspected that the Premier's plans for the money did not include construction of a northern railway, and opposed the bill on that basis. Clarke re-surfaced in Winnipeg to deny Sifton's charge that the A&GW had defaulted on any of its obligations, and Conservative leader Bennett opposed the confiscation out of stated respect for private property: "Clarke I despise but Clarke I am bound to respect because this province gave him a right by charter and if I know the United States I do not think it will allow this province to take his property 'without due process of law'."

The government won the vote 25 to 14. Once the legislation was signed into law by Bulyea, the government immediately wrote cheques drawing on the bond money. The Royal, Dominion, and Union banks, where the funds were deposited, refused payment. The government sued, and the provincial supreme court ruled in its favour in 1912. The Royal Bank subsequently requested that the federal government use its power of disallowance to invalidate the legislation and appealed the supreme court's decision to the British privy council, at the time Canada's highest court of appeal. While the federal government declined to act, in 1913 the privy council found that the provincial legislature did not have the authority to confiscate money that had been raised from investors from outside of the province.

In its objective of smoothing over Liberal divisions, Sifton's succession was only partially successful. Rutherford himself became increasingly distant from the party, and ran in the next election as an independent Liberal, opposed to Sifton's government. In addition, he offered to stump for the Conservatives across the province if they would agree to not run a candidate against him in his own riding; the Conservatives declined his offer, and Rutherford lost his Strathcona seat to Conservative Herbert Crawford. He went on to campaign for the Conservatives in the 1921 election. On the other side, Ezra Riley, a leader of the insurgency, resigned his seat in protest of Cushing's exclusion from the new administration. He ran as an independent in he ensuing by-election but was defeated by a pro-Sifton candidate, Liberal Archibald McArthur. It is possible that supporters of Cross would have also resigned, but Sifton brought him back into cabinet before the next election. With the noisiest dissidents neutralized, the Liberals enjoyed a period relatively free of intra-party strife, until the Conscription Crisis of 1917 once again split the party.
