= Ezra Riley =

Canadian politician

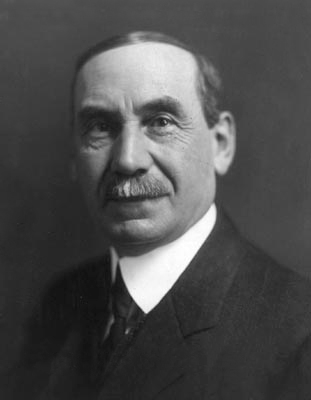

Member of the Legislative Assembly of Alberta
- In office 1911–1913
- Preceded by: Charles Stuart
- Succeeded by: Archibald J. McArthur
- Constituency: Gleichen

Personal details
- Born: June 5, 1866 Yorkville, Canada West
- Died: January 5, 1937 (aged 70) Calgary, Alberta, Canada
- Party: Liberal
- Spouse: Harriet Waterhouse (m.1897)
- Children: five
- Occupation: rancher, politician

Ezra Hounsfield Riley (June 5, 1866 – January 5, 1937) was a Canadian politician and rancher in Alberta, Canada. Riley served in the Legislative Assembly of Alberta from 1906–1910. A leader of the anti-Rutherford insurgency during the Alberta and Great Waterways Railway scandal, he resigned shortly after Sifton became premier.

== Early life ==
Riley was born in 1866 in Yorkville, Canada West (a suburb of Toronto then). He owned a large amount of land that he sold off to the City of Calgary in 1904. The land was developed into the historical Hillhurst-Sunnyside community northwest of Downtown.

== Provincial electoral wins in 1906 and 1909 ==
As a Liberal candidate, Riley was elected to the Legislative Assembly of Alberta in a by-election held in the Gleichen district on December 7, 1906. He successfully sought re-election in the 1909 Alberta general election, defending against runner-up Conservative candidate James Shouldice.

== Resignation and defeat ==
After serving a year into his second term, Riley resigned his seat to protest the leadership of Arthur Sifton who had become leader of the Liberal party and premier in the wake of the Alberta and Great Waterways Railway scandal. Riley ran in the subsequent by-election on October 3, 1910 as an independent. The Conservatives did not run a candidate in that by-election instead choosing to support Riley.

Explaining his resignation in a memorable stump speech on September 30, 1910, Riley was quoted as saying

I tell you, I am a Liberal, but I believe in the brand of Liberalism by and for the people. I am not afraid of the people and I could not continue to sit in the house at Edmonton without giving the people a chance to express themselves.

In the by-election, Riley lost by 100 votes. The result was hotly and bitterly contested, with accusations of tampered voters lists.

Riley's brother Harold Riley won the district seat for the Conservatives in another by-election almost exactly a year later.

== Honors ==
Riley Park in Calgary, Alberta, the site of which was on his former ranch is named in his honor.

Legislative Assembly of Alberta
| Preceded by Charles Stuart | MLA Gleichen; 1906-1910 | Succeeded by Archibald J. McArthur |
