= Tetiana Dziuba =

Ukrainian writer and poet (born 1966)

Tetiana Anatoliivna Dziuba (née Murzenko; born 19 July 1966) is a Ukrainian writer, literary critic, journalist, and translator. She is a Doctor of Sciences in Social Communications, a professor, People's Poet of Ukraine, and member of the National Union of Writers of Ukraine (2002).

== Early life and education ==
Tetiana Dziuba was born in Brusnytsia, Kitsman Raion, Chernivtsi Oblast, Ukrainian SSR, Soviet Union.

She graduated from the Faculty of Journalism of Taras Shevchenko Kyiv National University, postgraduate studies at the Institute of Literature of the National Academy of Sciences of Ukraine, and doctoral studies at the Institute of Journalism of Taras Shevchenko Kyiv National University.

== Career ==
Dziuba worked as the head of the department of the Chernihiv regional newspaper "Hart," the correspondent of the newspaper "Molod Ukrainy" in the Chernihiv region. She also taught at the Kyiv Institute "Slavic University" and the Taras Shevchenko Chernihiv State Pedagogical University. She is also a professor at Mykola Gogol Nizhyn State University.

Dziuba is a Doctor of Sciences in Social Communications, Professor, and Academician of the National Academy of Sciences of the Higher School of Kazakhstan. Since 2021, she has been an Honorary Professor of the Academic Center of Science and Education, named after Johann Goethe (Germany, Hessen, 2021).

Dziuba is a member of the National Union of Writers of Ukraine and the National Union of Journalists of Ukraine.

The "Golden Book of World Records" mentions the world records of Tetyana and Serhiy Dzyuba. Their works have been translated into one hundred languages of the world and printed in leading magazines of 80 countries, more than 50 of their books have been published in different languages abroad. Serhii and Tetiana Dzyuba are laureates of over 250 international awards in 65 countries.

== Private life ==
Dziuba is married to Ukrainian writer and translator Serhii Dzyuba.

== Selected awards and honors ==
Dziuba is a laureate of Ukrainian state, international, and foreign literary awards, including:

- Nikolai Gogol International Literary Prize (1999),
- All-Ukrainian Mykhailo Kotsiubinsky Literary and Artistic Award (2001),
- Lesya Ukrainka International Literary Prize (Kyiv, 2021),
- International Literary Award "Global Prestigious Award" named after Mahatma Gandhi ( India, Delhi, 2021),
- Johann Goethe International Literary Prize (Germany, 2021),
- International award "Inspiring Leadership Award" ("Leader who inspires", India, 2021),
- International Certificate of Victor Hugo for International Talent (France, Paris, 2022).

International and Ukrainian ratings and awards, such as:

- Laureate of the "People's Poet of Ukraine" Award (Kyiv, 2020),
- Medal of Honor "For Special Merit" of the National Union of Journalists of Ukraine (Kyiv, 2021),
- Honorable Mention of the National Union of Writers of Ukraine (Kyiv, 2021),
- "World Ambassador of Culture and Literature" (Honorary Award of the International Chamber of Writers and Artists of Spain, Madrid, 2022),
- Literature, Arts and Communications, Germany, Frankfurt am Main, 2023).
