= Mike Chornohus =

Canadian politician

Member of the Legislative Assembly of Alberta
- In office July 10, 1922 – June 28, 1926
- Preceded by: Andrew Shandro
- Succeeded by: George Mihalcheon
- Constituency: Whitford

Personal details
- Born: March 10, 1888 Ruskyi Banyliv (modern village of Banyliv, Bukowina, which was then a province of the Austro-Hungarian Empire)
- Died: February 17, 1966 (aged 77)
- Party: United Farmers
- Occupation: farmer and politician

Mike Chornohus was a farmer and a provincial politician from Alberta, Canada. He served as a member of the Legislative Assembly of Alberta from 1922 to 1926 sitting with the United Farmers caucus in government.

== Political career ==
=== Election and court action ===
Chornohus ran for a seat to the Legislative Assembly of Alberta as a United Farmers candidate in the electoral district of Whitford in the 1921 Alberta general election. The returning officer William Hawereliak did not accept his nomination papers on the grounds that it was improperly filled out with the claim that Chornohus signed his name with a "Z" and not an "S".

This legal technicality left Liberal incumbent Andrew Shandro to be returned by acclamation. The United Farmers of Alberta immediately took the matter to court to try to get an injunction to prevent the acclamation of Shandro.

The court action while unable to immediately prevent Shandro from being acclaimed was successful and resulted in having the results voided on December 4, 1921 causing Shandro to lose his seat. The court found that Chronohus nomination papers were denied for partisan reasons so that Shandro would be the only candidate in the race. They also found that Hawereliak was related to Shandro. The new writs for a by-election were issued for July 10, 1922 and the returning officer was replaced. The race was a rerun between Chronohus and Shandro, with Shandro getting defeated in a landslide. Ironically, both men were originally from the same village in Ukraine.

=== Legislative career ===
Chornohus took his seat on July 24, 1922 at the opening of the second session in the 5th Alberta Legislative Assembly.

Chornohus ran for re-nomination at a convention held on June 5, 1926 at Boian, Alberta. He was defeated finishing last among the four contenders by George Mihalcheon. Chronohus chose to retire after losing his party nomination and did not run for a second term in office when the Assembly was dissolved in 1926.
