= Whitford (provincial electoral district) =

Defunct provincial electoral district in Alberta, Canada

Alberta electoral district

Defunct provincial electoral district
- Legislature: Legislative Assembly of Alberta
- District created: 1913
- District abolished: 1940
- First contested: 1913
- Last contested: 1935

Whitford was a provincial electoral district in Alberta, Canada, mandated to return a single member to the Legislative Assembly of Alberta from 1913 to 1940.

== History ==
The Whitford electoral district was created in 1913 out of the southwest part of the Pakan district and the north part of Vegreville.

In 1940 the district was split between Redwater, Willingdon, and Vegreville.

The district was named after the northwest town of Whitford, Alberta.

=== Members of the Legislative Assembly (MLAs) ===
Members of the Legislative Assembly for Whitford
Assembly	Years	Member	Party
See Pakan electoral district from 1909-1913
3rd	1913–1915	Andrew S. Shandro	Liberal
3rd	1915–1917	Andrew S. Shandro	Liberal
4th	1917–1921	Andrew S. Shandro	Liberal
5th	1921–1922	Andrew S. Shandro	Liberal
5th	1922–1926	Mike Chornohus	United Farmers
6th	1926–1930	George Mihalcheon	United Farmers
7th	1930–1935	Isidore Goresky	United Farmers
8th	1935–1940	William Tomyn	Social Credit
See Redwater electoral district from 1940-1971; Willingdon electoral district from 1940-1963 and Vegreville electoral district from 1940-1993

== Election results ==
=== 1913 ===
1913 Alberta general election
Party	Candidate	Votes	%	±%
Liberal	Andrew S. Shandro	499	45.70%	–
Independent	Paul Rudyk	312	28.57%	–
Independent	C. F. Connolly	148	13.55%	–
Conservative	R. L. Hughson	133	12.18%	–
Total		1,092	–	–
Rejected, spoiled and declined		N/A	–	–
Eligible electors / turnout		1,427	76.52%	–
Liberal pickup new district.				
Source(s) Source: "Whitford Official Results 1913 Alberta general election". Alberta Heritage Community Foundation.

=== 1915 by-election ===
Alberta provincial by-election, March 15, 1915 Upon Andrew S. Shandro's election declared invalid by the courts
Party	Candidate	Votes	%	±%
Liberal	Andrew S. Shandro	697	59.02%	–
Conservative	R. Kremar	484	40.98%	–
Total		1,181	–	–
Rejected, spoiled and declined		N/A	–	–
Eligible electors / turnout		N/A	N/A	–
Liberal hold		Swing		N/A
Source(s) "By-elections". Elections Alberta.

=== 1917 ===
1917 Alberta general election
Party	Candidate	Votes	%	±%
Liberal	Andrew S. Shandro	Acclaimed	–	–
Total		N/A	–	–
Rejected, spoiled and declined		N/A	–	–
Eligible electors / turnout		N/A	N/A	N/A
Liberal hold		Swing		N/A
Source(s) Source: "Whitford Official Results 1917 Alberta general election". Alberta Heritage Community Foundation. One of eleven Members of the Legislative Assembly of Alberta acclaimed under The Elections Act Section 38, which stipulated that any member of the 3rd Alberta Legislative Assembly would be guaranteed re-election, with no contest held, if the member joined for wartime service in the First World War. An Act amending The Election Act respecting Members of the Legislative Assembly on Active Service., SA 1917, c. 38

=== 1921 ===
1921 Alberta general election
Party	Candidate	Votes	%	±%
Liberal	Andrew S. Shandro	Acclaimed	–	–
Total		N/A	–	–
Rejected, spoiled and declined		N/A	–	–
Eligible electors / turnout		N/A	N/A	N/A
Liberal hold		Swing		N/A
Source(s) Source: "Whitford Official Results 1921 Alberta general election". Alberta Heritage Community Foundation.

=== 1922 by-election ===
Alberta provincial by-election, July 10, 1922 Upon Andrew S. Shandro's election declared invalid by the courts
Party	Candidate	Votes	%	±%
United Farmers	Mike Chornohus	1,846	77.86%	–
Liberal	Andrew S. Shandro	525	22.14%	–
Total		2,371	–	–
Rejected, spoiled and declined		N/A	–	–
Eligible electors / turnout		N/A	N/A	–
United Farmers gain from Liberal		Swing		N/A
Source(s) "By-elections". Elections Alberta.

=== 1926 ===
1926 Alberta general election
Party	Candidate	Votes	%	±%
United Farmers	George Mihalcheon	1,449	56.71%	–
Farmer	Andrew S. Shandro	373	14.60%	–
Liberal	N. Grekol	371	14.52%	–
Conservative	E. Michajluk	274	10.72%	–
Farmer	L. M. Ferguson	88	3.44%	–
Total		2,555	–	–
Rejected, spoiled and declined		114	–	–
Eligible electors / turnout		4,189	63.71%	–
United Farmers gain from Liberal		Swing		N/A
Source(s) Source: "Whitford Official Results 1926 Alberta general election". Alberta Heritage Community Foundation.

=== 1930 ===
1930 Alberta general election
Party	Candidate	Votes	%	±%
United Farmers	Isidore Goresky	1,799	68.87%	12.16%
Liberal	Geo. Szkwarok	766	29.33%	14.81%
Independent	S. Suwala	47	1.80%	–
Total		2,612	–	–
Rejected, spoiled and declined		61	–	–
Eligible electors / turnout		4,468	59.83%	-3.89%
United Farmers hold		Swing		-1.28%
Source(s) Source: "Whitford Official Results 1930 Alberta general election". Alberta Heritage Community Foundation.

=== 1935 ===
1935 Alberta general election
Party	Candidate	Votes	%	±%
First count
Social Credit	William Tomyn	1,265	33.41%	–
Communist	M. Novakowski	966	25.52%	–
United Farmers	Isidore Goresky	940	24.82%	-44.05%
Liberal	Andrew S. Shandro	615	16.24%	-13.09%
Total		3,786	–	–
Ballot transfer results
Social Credit	William Tomyn	1,370	55.00%	–
United Farmers	Isidore Goresky	1,121	45.00%	–
No second choice		1,295	–	–
Total		2,491	–	–
Rejected, spoiled and declined		218	–	–
Eligible electors / turnout		5,143	77.85%	18.02%
Social Credit gain from United Farmers		Swing		15.83%
Source(s) Source: "Whitford Official Results 1935 Alberta general election". Alberta Heritage Community Foundation.

== By-election reasons ==
- March 15, 1915 — Election of Mr. Andrew Shandro declared void by the courts.
- July 10, 1922 — Election of Mr. Andrew Shandro declared void by the courts

== See also ==
- List of Alberta provincial electoral districts
- Canadian provincial electoral districts
