= George Mihalcheon =

Canadian politician

George M. Mihalcheon
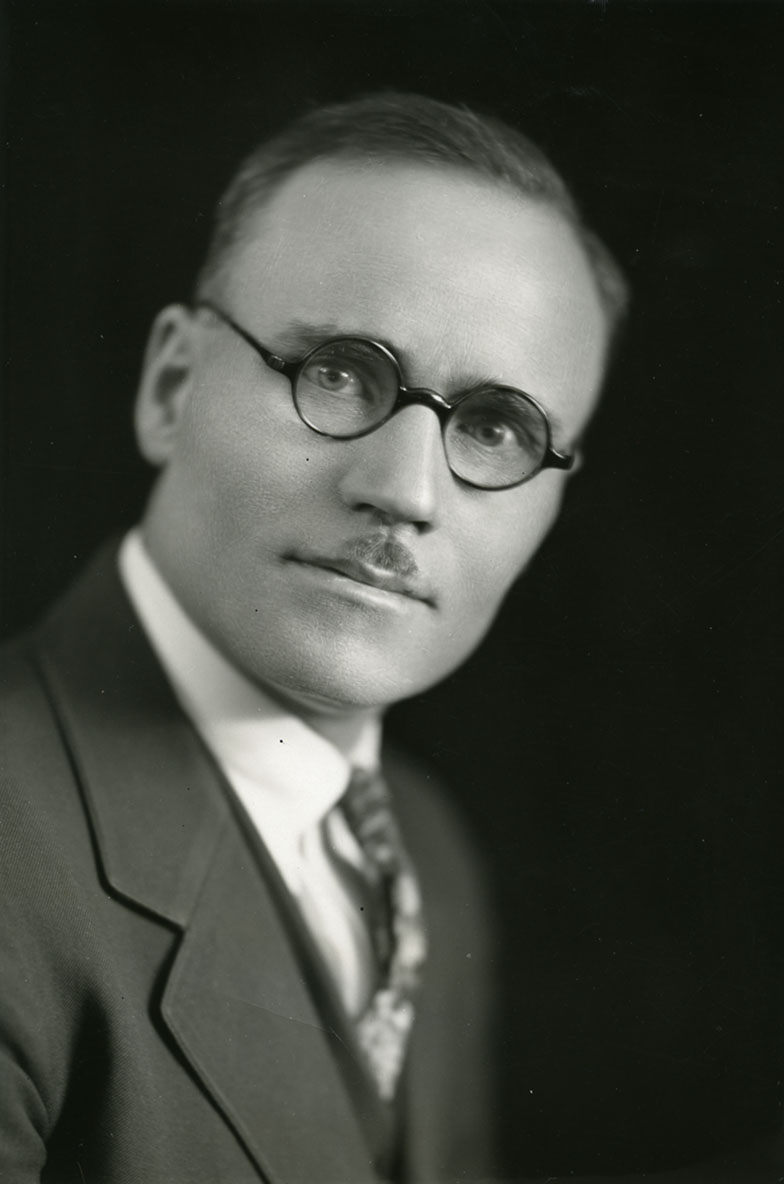

Member of the Legislative Assembly of Alberta
- In office June 28, 1926 – June 19, 1930
- Preceded by: Mike Chornohus
- Succeeded by: Isidore Goresky
- Constituency: Whitford

Personal details
- Born: October 1, 1893 Boian, Bukovina
- Died: October 2, 1956 (aged 63) Edmonton, Alberta, Canada
- Party: United Farmers
- Spouse: Mary Lutzak
- Occupation: politician, farmer, shopkeeper and teacher

George M. Mihalcheon (Romanian: George Mihălcean October 1, 1893 – October 2, 1956) was a politician from Alberta, Canada. He served in the Legislative Assembly of Alberta from 1926 to 1930 as a member of the United Farmers caucus in government.

== Early life ==
Mihalcheon was born in 1893 in Boian, Bukovina, a village which is now in Ukraine. He moved to Alberta with his family in 1901 to the town of Hairy Hill. He graduated normal school in 1918 and became a teacher in the town of Boian, Alberta. He married Mary Lutzak.

== Political career ==
Mihalcheon put his name forward to contest the nomination as the United Farmers candidate in the electoral district of Whitford in advance of the 1926 provincial election. He defeated the sitting United Farmers MLA Mike Chornohus and two other contenders to be named the party's candidate in the 1926 Alberta general election.

in the 1926 Alberta general election Mihalcheon and four other candidates ran in Whitford. Mihalcheon won a majority of the district's popular vote on the first count so was quickly elected, holding the district for his party. Among the candidates he defeated was former Liberal MLA Andrew Shandro, who finished second. Michalcheon was the first Alberta MLA of Romanian origin. His ability to speak English, Ukrainian, and Romanian was credited with helping him win the election.

Mihalcheon retired from the Assembly at dissolution in 1930, when the Whitford UFA association asked him to step down fearing that his Romanian heritage might cause the party to lose the district. Under his replacement, Isidore Goresky, the UFA did retain the seat.

== Late life ==
After his political career, Mihalcheon started farming. He also founded a general store.
