= William Tomyn =

Canadian politician

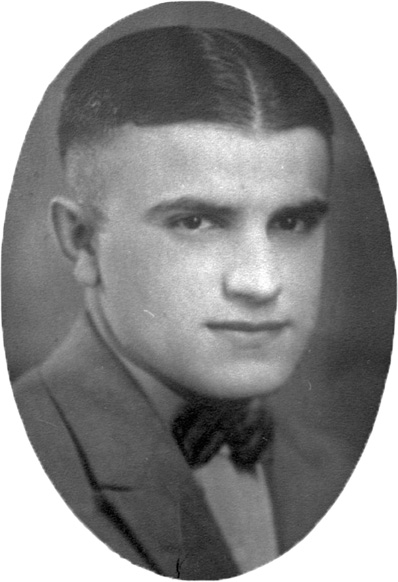

Member of the Legislative Assembly of Alberta
- In office August 22, 1935 – March 21, 1940
- Preceded by: Isidore Goresky
- Succeeded by: District Abolished
- Constituency: Whitford
- In office March 21, 1940 – August 5, 1952
- Preceded by: New District
- Succeeded by: Nick Dushenski
- Constituency: Willingdon
- In office June 18, 1959 – August 30, 1971
- Preceded by: New District
- Succeeded by: Catherine Chichak
- Constituency: Edmonton Norwood

Personal details
- Born: October 4, 1905 Warwick, Alberta
- Died: October 5, 1972 (aged 67)
- Party: Social Credit
- Children: Ron
- Occupation: teacher and politician

William Tomyn (October 4, 1905 – October 5, 1972) was a politician and teacher from Alberta, Canada. He served in the Legislative Assembly of Alberta from 1935 to 1952 and again from 1959 to 1971 as a member of the Social Credit Party.

== Early life ==
Tomyn taught in a one-room school house in Plain Lake, Alberta.

== Political career ==
Tomyn ran for a seat in the Alberta Legislature under the Social Credit banner in the 1935 Alberta general election, in the electoral district of Whitford. He defeated three other candidates, including incumbent Isidore Goresky and former MLA Andrew Shandro.

The district of Whitford was later abolished in redistribution in 1940. Tomyn ran in the new electoral district of Willingdon in the election held that year and won with a large majority.

Tomyn ran for a third term in the 1944 Alberta general election. He defeated Co-operative Commonwealth candidate L.L. Kostash on the second count to hold his seat.

Tomyn ran for a fourth term in the 1948 Alberta general election. He defeated Co-operative Commonwealth Federation candidate Nick Dushenski by 250 votes.

Tomyn faced Dushenski again in the 1952 election and was defeated in a close race on the second count.

Tomyn attempted a comeback as the Social Credit candidate in the new electoral district of Edmonton Norwood in the 1959 general election. He defeated four other candidates in a landslide. He thus became one of the few persons to have held both urban and rural districts in the Alberta legislature.

In the 1963 Alberta general election, Tomyn's share of the popular vote was significantly reduced since the last election but he was still returned with a comfortable majority.

In the 1967 general election, Tomyn faced NDP candidate and future MLA Grant Notley, whom he defeated by a margin of 1,000 votes.

Tomyn retired from the Alberta Legislature at dissolution in 1971. The length of his service made him the sixth longest-serving member of the Legislative Assembly of Alberta to date. He and Alfred Hooke were the last surviving members of the original Social Credit caucus of 1935, though Hooke served in the legislature for the entirety of the 36-year Socred dynasty.
