= Isidore Goresky =

Canadian politician

- Ізидор Ґорецький

Member of the Legislative Assembly of Alberta
- In office June 19, 1930 – August 22, 1935
- Preceded by: George Mihalcheon
- Succeeded by: William Tomyn
- Constituency: Whitford

Personal details
- Born: Izydor Goretskyi; November 11, 1902 Barbivtsi, Duchy of Bukovina, Austria-Hungary (now Brusnytsia, Ukraine)
- Died: February 22, 1999 (aged 96) Surrey, British Columbia, Canada
- Party: United Farmers
- Occupation: Farm labourer, teacher and politician

Military service
- Allegiance: Canada
- Branch/service: Royal Canadian Air Force
- Years of service: 1942-1945
- Battles/wars: World War II

Isidore Goresky (Ukrainian: Ізидор Ґорецький, romanized: Izydor Goretskyi; November 11, 1902 – February 22, 1999) was a Canadian farm labourer, teacher and provincial politician active in the province of Alberta. He served as a member of the Legislative Assembly of Alberta from 1930 to 1935 sitting with the United Farmers caucus in government.

== Early life ==
Isidore Goresky was born on November 25, 1902, in Barbivtsi, in the Austrian Duchy of Bukovina (now known as Brusnytsia and part of Ukraine). His family moved to Canada in 1905 after being unable to improve their living conditions. The family settled in Stony Mountain, Manitoba. He lived in the town until 1918 when his father Basil purchased a farm six miles to the north-west of the community.

Goresky began his working life as a farm hand and went to school in various locals around Manitoba. He tried to join the Army in 1917 but was unsuccessful. He began teaching in the fall of 1918 and worked his first stint for four months. He later went to the University of Manitoba in 1920 and then attended normal school in Brandon, Manitoba, graduating in 1922.

Goresky continued to work various teaching jobs until he moved to Alberta in 1926 to accept a job as a principal in Smoky Lake. He tried to re-enroll with the University of Manitoba to complete his master's degree but was unable to so he went to the University of Alberta instead. He obtained his master's degree in 1929. He ran for political office in 1930.

== Political career ==
Goresky ran for a seat to the Alberta Legislature in the 1930 Alberta general election as a United Farmers candidate in the Whitford electoral district. He defeated two other candidates by taking 70 percent of the district vote, a landslide margin of victory to hold the seat for his party. He was one of the first Ukrainians to serve in thee Alberta Legislature.

Goresky ran for a second term in the 1935 Alberta general election. He was defeated by Social Credit candidate William Tomyn finishing a distant third out of fourth place ahead of former MLA Andrew Shandro.

== Late life ==
After his defeat from office Goresky moved to Edmonton. He worked as a rector for the Ukrainian M. Hrushewsky Institute for a year and then got hired on as a teacher for the Edmonton Public Board of Education, after that he worked as a school superintendent in the town of Consort, Alberta. He began working on his Master's of Education in 1936 completing it in 1938. Goresky joined the Royal Canadian Air Force in 1942. He was discharged from the service after World War II in 1945. After the war he continued to work various education posts until 1966.

Goresky spent the late 1960s and 1970s researching early Ukrainian immigration to Canada, translating and publishing various records. He also translated and published two books History of Ukrainian Settlement in Canada and Ukrainian Pioneers of Alberta.

Goresky moved to White Rock, British Columbia, in 1986. He died on February 22, 1999, in Surrey, British Columbia. He was the last living member of the United Farmers government. His funeral service was held on March 1, 1999, at the Ukrainian Orthodox Church of St. Mary's in Surrey, British Columbia.
