= Volodymyr Rutkivskyi =

Ukrainian novelist (1937–2021)

- Володимир Григорович Рутківський
- Born: 18 April 1937; Khrestyteleve, Ukrainian SSR, Soviet Union
- Died: 31 October 2021 (aged 84); Odesa, Ukraine
- Education: Odesa National Polytechnic University
- Alma mater: Maxim Gorky Literature Institute
- Occupation: Writer
- Writing career
- Language: Ukrainian
- Genres: Children's literature Adventure; Historical fiction
- Notable works: The Stronghold («Сторожова застава», 1991); Jura («Джури», 2007)
- Notable awards: Lesya Ukrainka Award (2002); BBC Book of the Year (2011); Shevchenko National Prize (2012)

Volodymyr Hryhorovych Rutkivskyi (Ukrainian: Володи́мир Григо́рович Руткі́вський; 18 April 1937 – 31 October 2021) was a Ukrainian novelist. His work primarily dealt with historical fiction and adventure in the form of children's literature. Rutkivskyi is best known as the writer of The Stronghold (Ukrainian: «Сторожова застава»), which later had a film adaptation, and the tetralogy Jura («Джури»).

Born in Khrestyteleve in the Cherkasy Oblast, Rutkivskyi was first a chemist and engineer after graduating in 1960 from Odesa National Polytechnic University. However, while working at a plant, in 1959 he started publishing his literary works in the form of poems, although they had limited availability as he was accused by the Soviet government of Ukrainian nationalism. In 1981 he published one of his first novels in "The Bay from the Quiet Backwater", which was well received by critics, and then a decade later in 1991 he published "The Stronghold" which he had started writing in 1986. After leaving his job at a regional newspaper in the early 2000s, he wrote the trilogy "Blue Waters" and then the tetralogy "Jura" about the first Ukrainian Cossacks.

Over his career, Rutkivskyi would win numerous high-profile prizes like the Lesya Ukrainka Award and the Shevchenko National Prize alongside the Ukrainian edition of BBC's Book of the Year. In July 2024, a street in Odesa was renamed to "Volodymyr Rutkivskyi Street" in his honour.

== Early life ==
Rutkivskyi was born on 18 April 1937 in Khrestyteleve, which was then part of the Cherkasy Oblast in the Ukrainian SSR at the time of his birth. His family consisted of teachers. He later recalled that his father fought during the World War II and that his childhood during the war was difficult, as he stated there was always fear and silence. In 1955 he started attending the Odesa National Polytechnic University in order to be a chemist-technologist, graduating by 1960. In 1960, after graduating, he started working at Odesa Superphosphate Plant which he worked at until 1966. Initially, he worked in the department of cyro-lithium there, but was forced to transfer out after his teeth were destroyed by the fluoride vapors and instead went to the sulfuric acid workshop to produce concentrated sulfuric acid to make mélange.

== Literary career ==
In 1959, while working at the superphosphate plant, Rutkivskyi began publishing his literary works, although his works were mostly inaccessible during the Soviet era due to the government accusing him of spreading Ukrainian nationalism. The only publishing house in the Ukrainian SSR at the time was the state-owned "Rainbow", which refused to publish his works, but Russian copies of his work were accepted in Moscow. In 1966 he published his debut collection of poems called "Drops of the Sun" in Odesa. In 1967 he switched careers to become a journalist, writing for the Odesa newspapers "Yanvarets" and "Tribune Student" from 1967 to 1968. In 1968 he became an editor of the Odesa Regional Radio, which he did until 1973. He also in 1968 at the V All-Union Conference of Young Writers presented Ukrainian poetry for kids alongside other poets like Borys Oliynyk and Vitaly Korotich. In 1969 he became a full member of the National Writers' Union of Ukraine (NSPU).

In 1973, however, his career came to a halt after he signed an appeal to defend a radio journalist colleague, which was then sent to the regional party committee who accused him of being a "Ukrainian bourgeois nationalist". Oliynyk, who he had presented with in 1968, helped him in 1973 by helping him enroll to a two-year higher literary course in Moscow. He continued to write into the mid-1970s, despite this, writing the collection of poems "Air for Two" in 1973, "Open Bohdan's Window" in 1974, and "Balance" in 1976. For a year, from 1978 to 1979, he worked at the Odesa Film Studio where many other Ukrainian writers worked. In 1981, he published "The Bay from the Quiet Backwater" in Moscow with a hundred thousand copies, which was particularly well received by critics. In 1986 he started writing one of his most famous books, The Stronghold. In 1989 he was completed in the poem anthropology "September Dawn". Then, in 1991, he was awarded with the highest award from the Union of Journalists of the USSR and also published the book he had been writing "The Stronghold". Also in 1991 he became head of the department of the Odesa regional newspaper in "Odessa News", where he worked at until 2001.

After focusing his attention on the news, he returned to mostly writing in the early 2000s after leaving his job in 2001. In 2004 he wrote the trilogy "Blue Waters" and in 2005 he wrote his last poem called "Day of Living Water". In 2007 he published the first book of his tetralogy "Jura", which was written about the era of the first Ukrainian Cossacks, which he finished in 2015.

== Film adaptations ==
In 2015 it was announced that the book "The Stronghold" would be turned into a film, which would be directed by Yuriy Kovalyov. It was filmed throughout 2015, and it was announced that it would be a loose adaptation of the book. The film adaptation was released on 12 October 2017. In 2016 it was announced that the company Star Media was working on a film adaptation of the "Jura" series, specifically over the first book "Jura of the Cossack Shvayka".

== Honours and awards ==
In July 2024 a street in Odesa was renamed to Volodymyr Rutkivskyi Street in his honour.

- Mykola Trublaini Literary Prize for The Stronghold (1992)
- Lesya Ukrainka Award for The Stronghold (2002)
- Literary Award "The Sound of the Web" named after Viktor Blyznets for the trilogy "Blue Waters" (2005)
- BBC Book of the Year for the trilogy "Blue Waters" (2011)
- Shevchenko National Prize for the trilogy "Jura" (2012)
