= Nick Dushenski =

Canadian politician

Nick William Dushenski

Member of the Legislative Assembly of Alberta
- In office August 5, 1952 – June 18, 1959
- Preceded by: William Tomyn
- Succeeded by: Nicholas Melnyk
- Constituency: Willingdon

Personal details
- Born: September 4, 1920 Whitford, Alberta
- Died: February 13, 2009 (aged 88) Lamont, Alberta
- Party: Co-operative Commonwealth
- Spouse: Mary Semeniuk
- Occupation: Teacher, farmer

Nick William Dushenski (September 4, 1920 – February 13, 2009) was a farmer, teacher and a provincial politician in Alberta, Canada. He served as a Co-operative Commonwealth Federation member of the Legislative Assembly of Alberta from 1952 to 1959.

== Personal life and career ==
Dushenski was born in Whitford, Alberta, the youngest of nine children. At the age of 21, he began his teaching career in a one-room schoolhouse in Beaverdam, Alberta and would teach throughout northern British Columbia and Alberta until settling in Willingdon, Alberta in 1946 where he would teach until 1979, as well as run a farm with his wife and their 8 children.

== Political career ==
Dushenski ran for a seat to the Alberta Legislature in the 1948 Alberta general election as a Co-operative Commonwealth candidate in the electoral district of Willingdon. He was defeated in a closely contested two-way race by incumbent William Tomyn.

Tomyn and Dushenski faced each other for the second time in the 1952 Alberta general election. Dushenski finished first place on the first vote count ahead of Tomyn by 44 votes. On the second vote preferences Dushenski surged to pick up the district with a respectable majority. Dushenski became one of two CCF MLAs in the Alberta legislature, alongside party leader Elmer Roper.

Dushenski ran for a second term in the 1955 Alberta general election. He won another closely contested three-way election defeating future MLA Nicholas Melnyk on the second vote count to hold his seat.

The 1955 election saw CCF leader Elmer Roper lose his seat, although the CCF picked up a seat allowing it to continue with a two-seat caucus. As the more experienced of the two, Dushenski became the CCF's house leader and was de facto leader of the party until Floyd Albin Johnson became party leader in 1957. As Johnson was not an MLA, Dushenski continued as the party's parliamentary leader until the next election.

Dushenski retired from public office at dissolution of the assembly in 1959 and resumed his teaching career.

== Late life ==
Dushenski returned to the Alberta Legislature in 2006 with Raymond Reierson and Arthur Dixon as the most senior members at the 100th Anniversary celebration of the Alberta Legislature. He died three years later on February 13, 2009.
