= Lesya Ukrainka Award =

Ukrainian literary prize

Lesya Ukrainka Award is the Cabinet of Ministers of Ukraine prize awarded for literary and artistic works for children and youth. It is awarded yearly on the birthday of a prominent Ukrainian writer, Lesya Ukrainka, on 25 February.

The Lesya Ukrainka Award is granted for works that have gained broad public recognition and contribute to the education of the younger generation in the spirit of national dignity and spiritual unity of Ukrainian society. In 2004, it received the status of the government award, and since then, it has been awarded in four nominations of 10,000 Ukrainian hryvnias (UAH) each:

- Literary works for children and youth;
- Artistic book design for children and youth;
- Theatrical performances for children and youth;
- Films for children and youth (since 2007).

In 2018, the Government of Ukraine increased the amount of the financial reward for winning each of the nominations from 10,000 to 20,000 UAH to encourage journalists, authors, artists, translators of artistic and journalistic works, and theater and film teams to create new original works.

== History ==
Lesya Ukrainka Literary Award for the best work for children was established by the resolution of the Central Committee of the Communist Party of Ukraine and the Council of Ministers of the Ukrainian SSR dated July 17, 1970, N 372 "On the celebration of the 100th anniversary of the birth of Lesya Ukrainka". The prize has been awarded annually since 1972, for 1,000 rubles "for deep-ideal and highly artistic works for children that contribute to the communist education of the younger generation and have gained wide public recognition."

In 2004, the "Lesya Ukrainka Award of the Cabinet of Ministers of Ukraine for literary and artistic works for children and youth" was established. It is "awarded annually for works that contribute to the education of the younger generation in the spirit of national dignity, spiritual unity of Ukrainian society and have gained wide public recognition."

== Selected laureates ==
=== Nomination Literary Works for Children and Youth ===
- 1972 - Natalia Zabila;
- 1974 - Oksana Ivanenko;
- 1980 - Hryhir Tiutiunnyk;
- 1982 - Vsevolod Nestayko;
- 1983 - Volodymyr Malyk;
- 1994 - Dmytro Nytczenko;
- 2001 - Mariya Lyudkevych;
- 2002 - Volodymyr Rutkivskyi;
- 2007 - Zirka Menzatyuk;
- 2020 - Dara Korniy;
- 2022 - Olesya Mamchich.

=== Nomination Art Book Design for Youth and Children ===
- 2013 - Victoria Kovalchuk

=== Nomination Films for Children and Youth ===
- 2021 - a full-length feature film, Stop-Zemlia. Script writer and director — Kateryna Gornostai
