= Willingdon-Two Hills =

Defunct provincial electoral district in Alberta, Canada

Alberta electoral district

Defunct provincial electoral district
- Legislature: Legislative Assembly of Alberta
- District created: 1963
- District abolished: 1971
- First contested: 1963
- Last contested: 1967

Willingdon-Two Hills was a provincial electoral district in Alberta, Canada, mandated to return a single member to the Legislative Assembly of Alberta using the first past the post method of voting from 1963 to 1971.

== History ==
Willingdon-Two Hills was formed from the abolished Willingdon riding expanded south in 1963 when Vegreville merged with Bruce, to form Vegreville-Bruce. Due to the expanded boundaries the riding name was changed to Willingdon-Two Hills.

Willingdon-Two Hills was dissolved following the 1971 electoral district re-distribution, and the territory was incorporated into Vegreville and Redwater-Andrew electoral districts.

Willingdon-Two Hills is named for the former towns of Willingdon and Two Hills.

=== Members of the Legislative Assembly (MLAs) ===
Members of the Legislative Assembly for Willingdon-Two Hills
Assembly	Years	Member	Party
See Willingdon electoral district from 1940-1963
15th	1963–1967	Nicholas A. Melnyk	Social Credit
16th	1967–1971	Nicholas A. Melnyk	Social Credit
See Vegreville electoral district from 1971-1993 and Redwater-Andrew electoral district from 1971-1993

== Electoral history ==
=== 1963 ===
1963 Alberta general election
Party	Candidate	Votes	%	±%
Social Credit	Nicholas A. Melnyk	2,315	56.64%	–
Progressive Conservative	Walter Witwicky	993	24.30%	–
New Democratic	William Glen Haley	496	12.14%	–
Liberal	Allan Eschak	283	6.92%	–
Total		4,087	–	–
Rejected, spoiled and declined		8	–	–
Eligible electors / turnout		6,009	68.15%	–
Social Credit pickup new district.				
Source(s) Source: "Willingdon-Two Hills Official Results 1963 Alberta general election". Alberta Heritage Community Foundation.

=== 1967 ===
1967 Alberta general election
Party	Candidate	Votes	%	±%
Social Credit	Nicholas A. Melnyk	2,160	62.46%	5.82%
New Democratic	Louis Souter	1,298	37.54%	25.40%
Total		3,458	–	–
Rejected, spoiled and declined		12	–	–
Eligible electors / turnout		3,470	100.00%	–
Social Credit hold		Swing		-3.71%
Source(s) Source: "Willingdon-Two Hills Official Results 1967 Alberta general election". Alberta Heritage Community Foundation.

== See also ==
- List of Alberta provincial electoral districts
- Canadian provincial electoral districts
