= Maria Liudkevych =

Ukrainian writer and poet (born 1948)

- Марія Людкевич
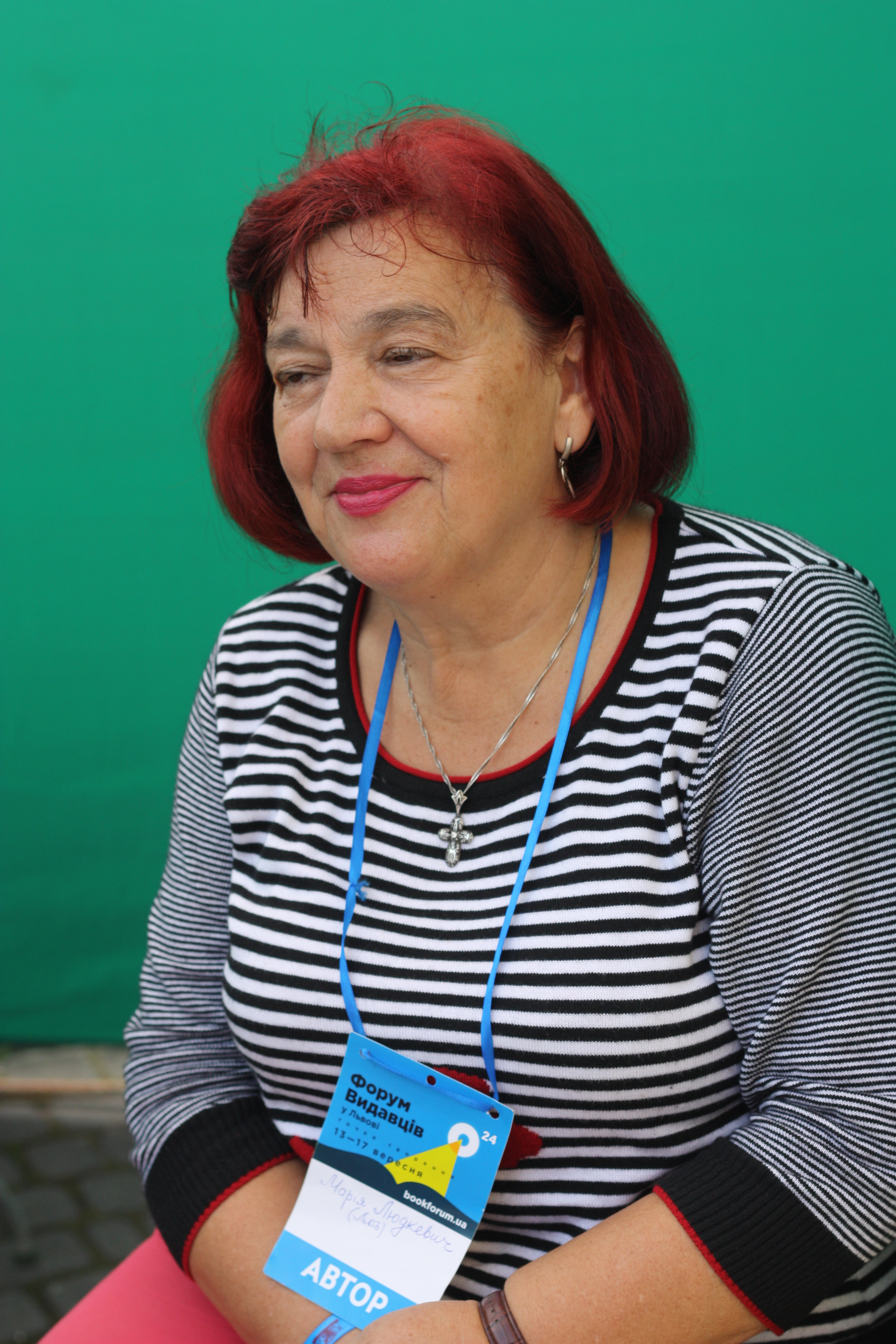
- Mariya in 2017
- Born: Mariya Yosypivna Lyudkevych; 7 January 1948 (age 78); Nizhnia Lipitsia, Ukrainian SSR, Soviet Union (now Ukraine)
- Education: University of Lviv
- Occupations: Writer and poet
- Spouse: Orest Bilous
- Awards: Order of Princess Olga; Lesya Ukrainka Award

Maria Yosypivna Liudkevych (Ukrainian: Марія Йосипівна Людкевич; born 7 January 1948) is a Ukrainian writer and poet, in addition to her work as a teacher, newspaper editor, and journalist.

== Early life and education ==
On 7 January 1948 she was born in the Ivano-Frankivsk Oblast's Nyzhny Lypytsia, in the Rohatyn Raion. She graduated from the Faculty of Journalism from Ivan Franko Lviv State University and Kolomyia Pedagogical School. She had positions as an editor of the Lviv newspaper "Galytian Youth," later a journalist for the same newspaper, and a junior high school teacher. Head of the literary studio "Dzhereltse" at the Lviv Regional Library for Children for over 30 years.

== Books ==
As of 2024 half of Mariya's 44 books are written for young readers, with the notable ones being:

- Теплі гнізда (in Ukrainian). SPOLOM. 1981. ISBN 9789669193179.
- Червнева повінь (in Ukrainian). 1983.
- Продовження літа (in Ukrainian). 1986.
- Джмелятко (in Ukrainian). 1987.
- На Білій горі (in Ukrainian). 1990.
- Старий годинникар (in Ukrainian). 1991.
- Благослови, Маріє (in Ukrainian). 1995.
- Коротке літо в раю (in Ukrainian). SPOLOM. 1995. ISBN 9789669193186.
- Левцеве товариство з міста Лева (in Ukrainian). 1997.
- Домовик без черевик (in Ukrainian). 1999.
- Ностальгія за тим, що не сталося (in Ukrainian). 1999.
- Квіткова пані (in Ukrainian). 2000.
- Мудрагелія (in Ukrainian). 2000.
- Мурко-Жмурко (in Ukrainian). 2001.
- Срібна тінь сосни (in Ukrainian). 2003.
- Хто сміявся з страхопуда (in Ukrainian). 2003.
- Кольорові парасольки (in Ukrainian). 2004.
- Шайда-байда (in Ukrainian). 2005.
- Торбина Усміхненого Котика (in Ukrainian). 2005.
- Крила білої хати (in Ukrainian). 2006.
- Петрова гора з диким терном (in Ukrainian). 2007.
- Ми на святі в Левеняти (in Ukrainian). 2007.
- Квітка, якою тішиться Бог (in Ukrainian). 2007.
- Мирославині таємниці (in Ukrainian). 2009.
- Пізнаймо місто рідне (in Ukrainian). 2010.
- Спитати в янгола (in Ukrainian). 2012.
- Іграшкова абетка (in Ukrainian). 2013.
- Лірика (in Ukrainian). 2014.і Змій Головастик
- Столітній трамвай-чарівник (in Ukrainian). 2015.
- і Змій Головастик (in Ukrainian). Видавництво Старого Лева. 2015. ISBN 978-617-679-107-2.
- Ярко і Змій Головастик (in Ukrainian). 2016.
- Порив і подив (in Ukrainian). 2017.
- гойдалці дня і ночі (in Ukrainian). 2018.
- Де сховалась таємниця (in Ukrainian). 2019.

== Personal life ==
Mariya is married to Orest Bilous, an artist. Their daughters attended the Academy of Arts and graduated. While Olesya resides in Kyiv and works as an artistic editor, Christina started composing poems.

== Awards ==
Many honours were bestowed upon Mariyta for her artistic and civic endeavours. Among the awards are:

- Order of Princess Olga Second Class; Third Class (2006)
- Dmytro Nytczenko Prize (2003)
- Blagovest literary prize (1997)
- Iryna Vilde Literary Prize (2010)
- Lesya Ukrainka Award (2001)
- Bohdan Lepky Prize
