= Prizes of Ukraine in Literature =

Ukrainian award for writers

Prizes of Ukraine in Literature (Ukrainian: Літературні Премії України, romanized: Literaturni Premii Ukrainy) is a material or honorary encouragement of writer or authors in Ukraine for achievements in various genres of literature.

- Shevchenko National Prize
- Maksym Rylsky Prize
- Pavlo Tychyna Prize
- Republican Prize in a field of literary-fiction critic
- Lesya Ukrainka Prize
- Nikolai Ostrovsky Prize of the Lenin's Komsomol of Ukraine
- Yaroslav Hadan Republican Prize in a field of journalism
- Andriy Holovko Prize
- Yuriy Yanovsky Prize
- Ivan Franko Prize
- Pavlo Usenko Prize of the Molod Publishing
- Oleksandr Kopylenko Prize of the Barvinok magazine
- Vasyl Stus Prize
- Kobzar Literary Award

== See also ==
- List of literary awards
- List of poetry awards
- Warrior of Light
