= Olesya Mamchich =

Ukrainian poet and children's writer

- Олеся Олександрівна Мамчич
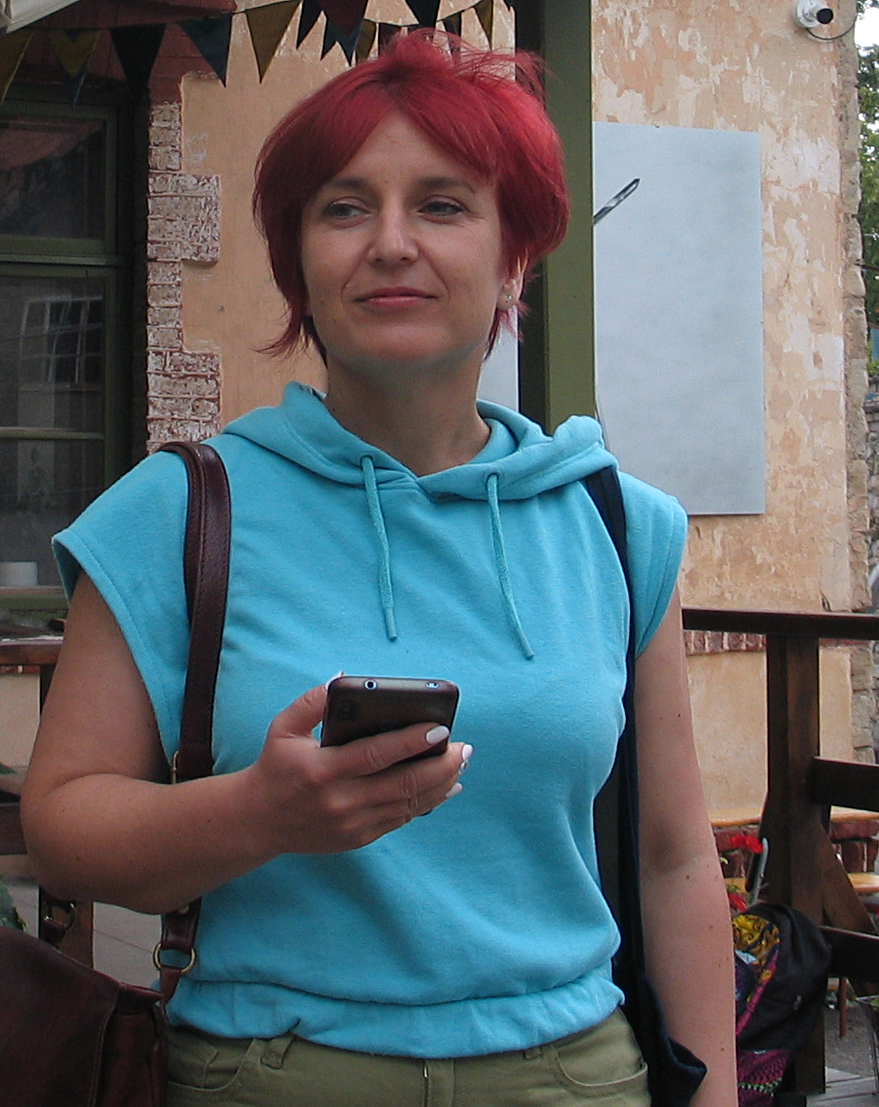
- Born: 1981 (age 44–45); Kyiv
- Occupations: poet, children's writer
- Awards: Lesya Ukrainka Award

Olesya Mamchich, also spelled Mamchych (born 1981) is a Ukrainian poet and children's writer.

== Early life and education ==
Olesya Mamchich was born in 1981, in Kyiv. She completed studies in creative writing at the Taras Shevchenko National University of Kyiv.

== Career ==
Olesya Mamchich debuted in 2005. Her poems for children are taught as part of Ukrainian elementary school curriculum. Her works have been translated into English, Polish, Belarusian, Georgian, Romanian, Russian, Lithuanian, Latvian and Hebrew. Her texts inspired songs of the Ukrainian band OY Sound System.

Mamchich organised many poem reading events at the Euromaidan protests. She is a curator of a Ukrainian children's literature award. In 2022, she received the Lesya Ukrainka Award in the Literary Works for Children and Youth category.

== Publications ==
=== Poetry ===
- Перекотиболе, 2005
- Обкладинка, 2014
- Сонце пішло у декрет, 2014

=== Children's books ===
- А на нас упав ананас, 2013
- Тиранозавр Оленка, 2017
- Електромобіль Сашко, 2018
- Хто з’їв мою піжаму?, 2018
