= Sekun =

Sekun Секунь
- Village
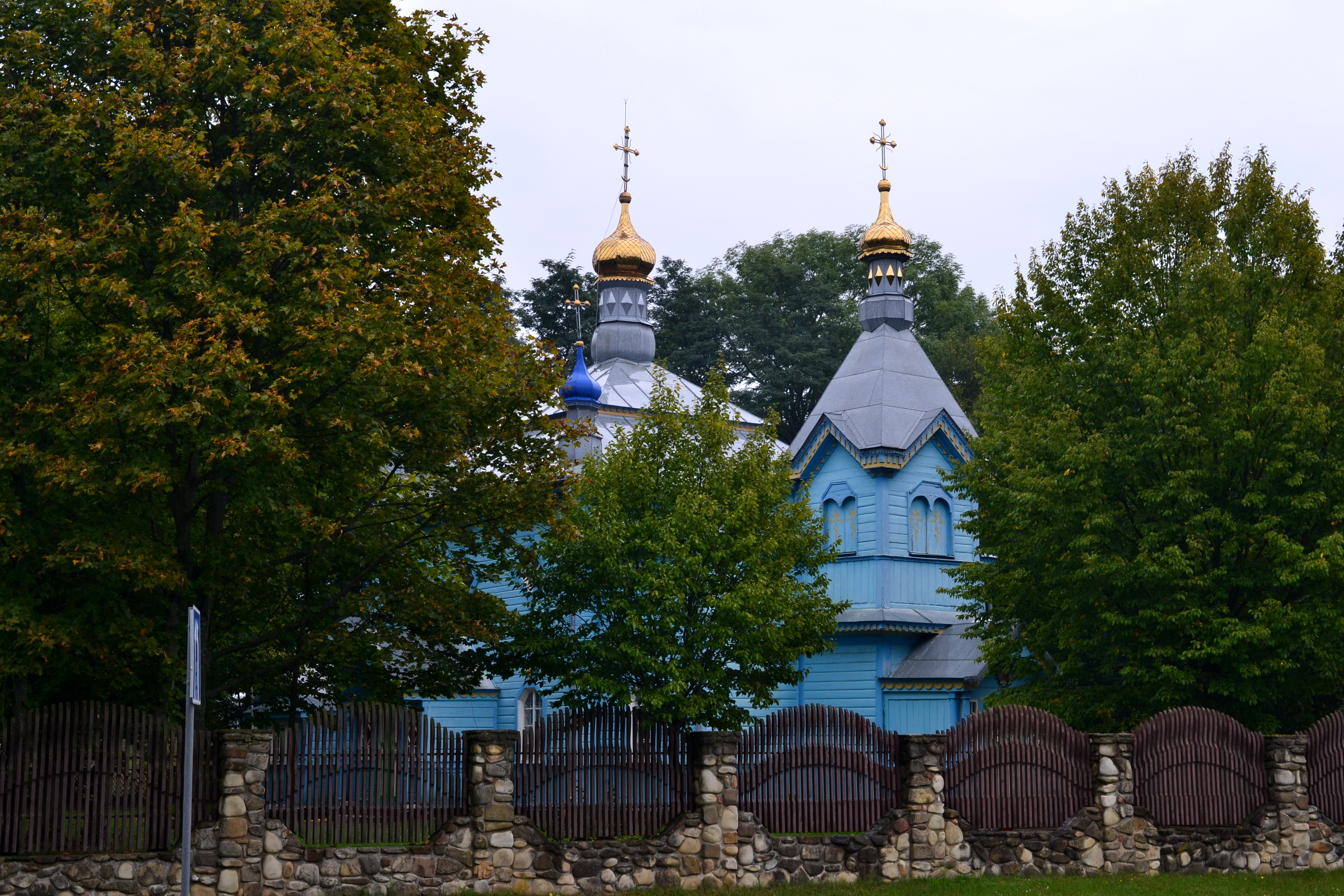

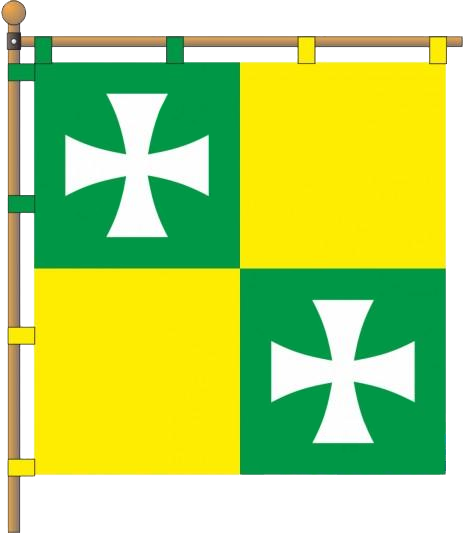
- Flag

- Location of Sekun Sekun (Ukraine)
- Coordinates: 51°21′35″N 24°37′36″E
- Country: Ukraine
- Oblast: Volyn Oblast
- Raion: Kovel Raion
- First mentioned: 1543
- Elevation: 168 m (551 ft)

Population (2001)
  - Total: 590
- Time zone: UTC+2 (EET)
  - Summer (DST): UTC+3 (EEST)
- Postal code: UA 44444
- Area code: +380 3346

Sekun (Ukrainian: Секунь, Polish: Siekuń) is a village in Kovel Raion, Volyn Oblast, Ukraine.

Until 18 July 2020, Sekun belonged to Stara Vyzhivka Raion. The raion was abolished in July 2020 as part of the administrative reform of Ukraine, which reduced the number of raions of Volyn Oblast to four. The area of Stara Vyzhivka Raion was merged into Kovel Raion.

== Demographics ==
Native language as of the Ukrainian Census of 2001:

- Ukrainian 99.15%
- Russian 0.51%
- Belarusian 0.34%

== Notable people ==
- Dara Korniy (born 1970), writer
