= Willingdon (electoral district) =

Defunct provincial electoral district in Alberta, Canada

Coordinates: 53.82°N 112.12°W

Alberta electoral district

Defunct provincial electoral district
- Legislature: Legislative Assembly of Alberta
- District created: 1940
- District abolished: 1967
- First contested: 1940
- Last contested: 1963

Willingdon was a provincial electoral district in Alberta, Canada, mandated to return a single member to the Legislative Assembly of Alberta from 1940 to 1963.

== History ==
Willingdon was created in 1940 when Victoria and Whitford were split between this district and Redwater and Vegreville

The riding expanded south in 1963 when Vegreville merged with Bruce, to form Vegreville-Bruce. Due to the expanded boundaries the riding name was changed to Willingdon-Two Hills.

=== Members of the Legislative Assembly (MLAs) ===
Members of the Legislative Assembly for Willingdon
Assembly	Years	Member	Party
See Victoria electoral district from 1905-1940 and Whitford electoral district from 1913-1940
9th	1940–1944	William Tomyn	Social Credit
10th	1944–1948	William Tomyn	Social Credit
11th	1948–1952	William Tomyn	Social Credit
12th	1952–1955	Nick W. Dushenski	Co-operative Commonwealth
13th	1955–1959	Nick W. Dushenski	Co-operative Commonwealth
14th	1959–1963	Nicholas A. Melnyk	Social Credit
See Willingdon-Two Hills electoral district from 1963-1971

== Election results ==
=== 1940 ===
1940 Alberta general election
Party	Candidate	Votes	%	±%
Social Credit	William Tomyn	2,329	61.11%	–
Co-operative Commonwealth	T. Tomashavsky	968	25.40%	–
Independent	M. N. Grekol	514	13.49%	–
Total		3,811	–	–
Rejected, spoiled and declined		165	–	–
Eligible electors / turnout		6,172	64.42%	–
Social Credit pickup new district.				
Source(s) Source: "Willingdon Official Results 1940 Alberta general election". Alberta Heritage Community Foundation.

=== 1944 ===
1944 Alberta general election
Party	Candidate	Votes 1st count	%	Votes final count	±%
Social Credit	William Tomyn	1,771	44.30%	1,844	-16.82%
Co-operative Commonwealth	L. L. Kostash	1,328	33.22%	1,448	7.82%
Labor-Progressive	William A. Yusep	899	22.49%	–	–
Total		3,998	–	–	–
Rejected, spoiled and declined		N/A	–	–	–
Eligible electors / turnout		5,867	68.14%	3.72%	–
Social Credit hold		Swing		-12.32%	
Source(s) Source: "Willingdon Official Results 1944 Alberta general election". Alberta Heritage Community Foundation. Instant-runoff voting requires a candidate to receive a plurality (greater than 50%) of the votes. As no candidate received a plurality of votes, the bottom candidate was eliminated and their 2nd place votes were applied to both other candidates until one received a plurality.

=== 1948 ===
1948 Alberta general election
Party	Candidate	Votes	%	±%
Social Credit	William Tomyn	2,111	53.15%	8.85%
Co-operative Commonwealth	Nick W. Dushenski	1,861	46.85%	13.64%
Total		3,972	–	–
Rejected, spoiled and declined		121	–	–
Eligible electors / turnout		5,638	72.60%	4.45%
Social Credit hold		Swing		-2.39%
Source(s) Source: "Willingdon Official Results 1948 Alberta general election". Alberta Heritage Community Foundation.

=== 1952 ===
1952 Alberta general election
Party	Candidate	Votes 1st count	%	Votes final count	±%
Co-operative Commonwealth	Nick W. Dushenski	1,760	42.55%	2,026	-4.30%
Social Credit	William Tomyn	1,716	41.49%	1,812	-11.66%
Liberal	John J. Fedun	660	15.96%	–	–
Total		4,136	–	–	–
Rejected, spoiled and declined		201	–	–	–
Eligible electors / turnout		5,776	75.09%	2.49%	–
Co-operative Commonwealth gain from Social Credit		Swing		-2.62%	
Source(s) Source: "Willingdon Official Results 1952 Alberta general election". Alberta Heritage Community Foundation. Instant-runoff voting requires a candidate to receive a plurality (greater than 50%) of the votes. As no candidate received a plurality of votes, the bottom candidate was eliminated and their 2nd place votes were applied to both other candidates until one received a plurality.

=== 1955 ===
1955 Alberta general election
Party	Candidate	Votes 1st count	%	Votes final count	±%
Co-operative Commonwealth	Nick W. Dushenski	1,729	42.53%	2,108	-0.02%
Social Credit	Nicholas A. Melnyk	1,580	38.87%	1,701	-2.62%
Liberal	Nick Shandro	756	18.60%	2.64%	–
Total		4,065	–	–	–
Rejected, spoiled and declined		203	–	–	–
Eligible electors / turnout		5,654	75.49%	0.40%	–
Co-operative Commonwealth hold		Swing		1.30%	
Source(s) Source: "Willingdon Official Results 1955 Alberta general election". Alberta Heritage Community Foundation. Instant-runoff voting requires a candidate to receive a plurality (greater than 50%) of the votes. As no candidate received a plurality of votes, the bottom candidate was eliminated and their 2nd place votes were applied to both other candidates until one received a plurality.

=== 1959 ===
1959 Alberta general election
Party	Candidate	Votes	%	±%
Social Credit	Nicholas A. Melnyk	2,421	63.64%	24.78%
Progressive Conservative	Alex Hushlak	991	26.05%	–
Co-operative Commonwealth	Nick W. Svekla	392	10.30%	-32.23%
Total		3,804	–	–
Rejected, spoiled and declined		31	–	–
Eligible electors / turnout		5,111	75.03%	-0.45%
Social Credit gain from Co-operative Commonwealth		Swing		16.96%
Source(s) Source: "Willingdon Official Results 1959 Alberta general election". Alberta Heritage Community Foundation.

== Plebiscite results ==
=== 1948 electrification plebiscite ===
District results from the first province wide plebiscite on electricity regulation.

Option A	Option B
Are you in favour of the generation and distribution of electricity being continued by the Power Companies?	Are you in favour of the generation and distribution of electricity being made a publicly owned utility administered by the Alberta Government Power Commission?
1,069 28.42%	2,716 71.76%
Province wide result: Option A passed.

=== 1957 liquor plebiscite ===
1957 Alberta liquor plebiscite results: Willingdon
Question A: Do you approve additional types of outlets for the sale of beer, wine and spirituous liquor subject to a local vote?
Ballot choice	Votes	%
Yes	1,400	76.63%
No	427	23.37%
Total votes	1,827	100%
Rejected, spoiled and declined	19	
5,979 eligible electors, turnout 30.88%

On October 30, 1957, a stand-alone plebiscite was held province wide in all 50 of the then current provincial electoral districts in Alberta. The government decided to consult Alberta voters to decide on liquor sales and mixed drinking after a divisive debate in the legislature. The plebiscite was intended to deal with the growing demand for reforming antiquated liquor control laws.

The plebiscite was conducted in two parts. Question A, asked in all districts, asked the voters if the sale of liquor should be expanded in Alberta, while Question B, asked in a handful of districts within the corporate limits of Calgary and Edmonton, asked if men and women should be allowed to drink together in establishments.

Province wide Question A of the plebiscite passed in 33 of the 50 districts while Question B passed in all five districts. Willingdon voted in favour of the proposal with one of the largest percentages in the province. Voter turnout in the district was one of the worst in the province, barely topping 30%, significantly below the province wide average of 46%.

Official district returns were released to the public on December 31, 1957. The Social Credit government in power at the time did not consider the results binding. However the results of the vote led the government to repeal all existing liquor legislation and introduce an entirely new Liquor Act.

Municipal districts lying inside electoral districts that voted against the Plebiscite were designated Local Option Zones by the Alberta Liquor Control Board and considered effective dry zones. Business owners who wanted a licence had to petition for a binding municipal plebiscite in order to be granted a licence.

== See also ==
- List of Alberta provincial electoral districts
- Canadian provincial electoral districts
- Willingdon, a town in Alberta
