= Oleksandr Dermanskyi =

Ukrainian writer

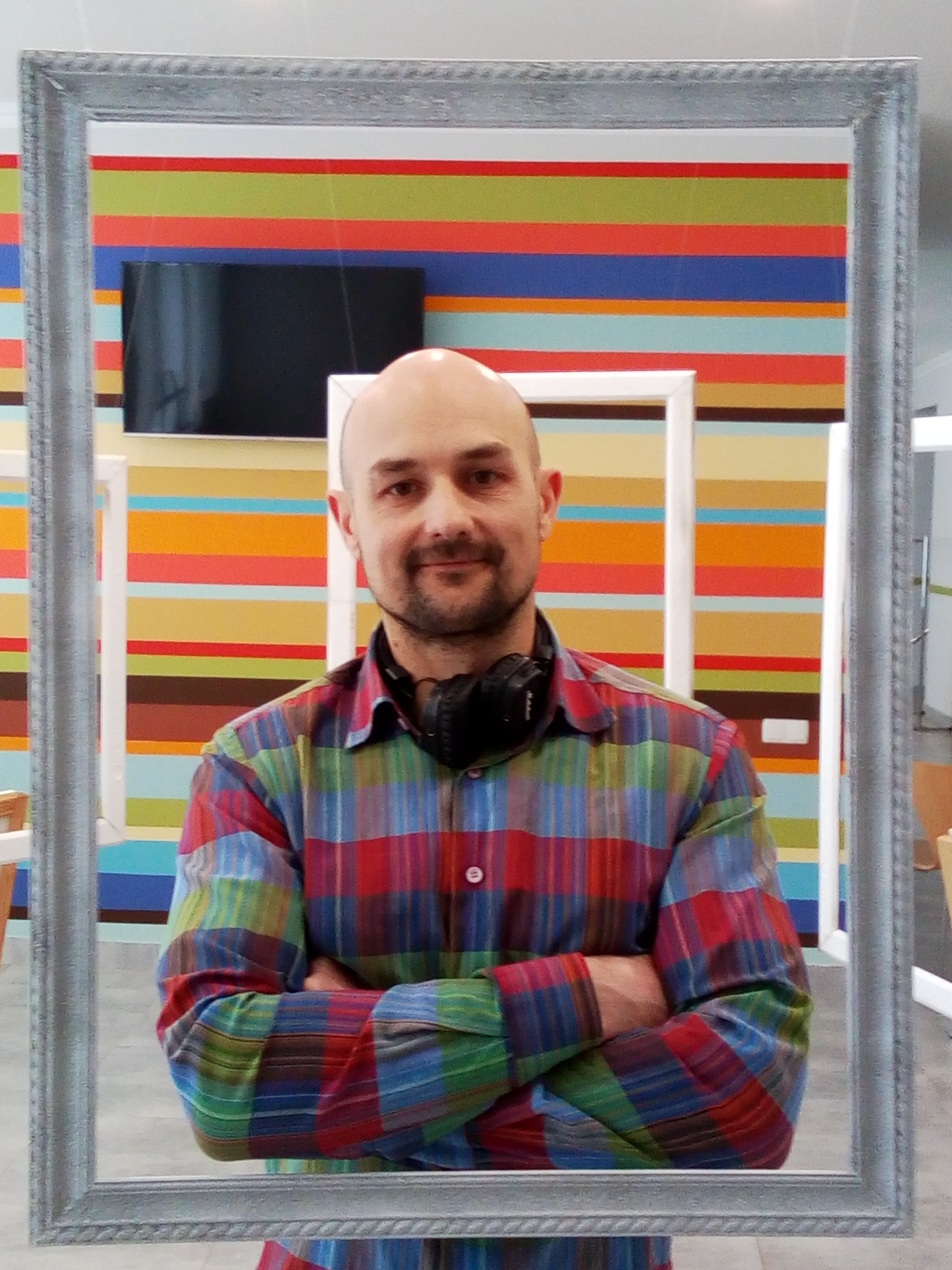
- Born: 28 November 1976 (age 49) Kyiv Oblast, Ukraine
- Years active: 2001-present
- Children: 2

Oleksandr Dermanskyi, known as Sashko Dermanskyi (born 28 November 1976), is a Ukrainian writer who wrote many novels and books of poetry for children. Many of his books have received critical acclaim and are well known in Ukraine. His works are recommended by the Ukrainian Ministry of Education and are included into the reading school curricula for elementary and middle schools.

== Early life and family ==
Sashko was born and raised in the village of Haivoron, Volodarka Rural District, Bila Tserkva Raion, Kyiv Oblast. He is the middle son of three boys and has two brothers, Oleh and Oleskiy. His father is an agronomist, and his mother was a schoolteacher.

On 20 January 2023 his brother Oleh was killed in action in Donetsk Oblast while defending Ukraine from the Russian aggression. His brother Oleksiy joined the military in 2014 and was wounded in October 2014 during military operations near the Donbass Airport. On 26 February 2022, after the full-scale Russian invasion, he returned to the Ukrainian Armed Forces.

Dermanskyi now lives in Kyiv, Ukraine. He is married and has two daughters, Vladyslava (2001) and Zlata (2011).

== Education ==
Dermanskyi received his early education in Volodarka School #1. He started writing his first poetry during his school years, inspired by numerous classic and contemporary Ukrainian authors.

In 1999, he graduated from the National Pedagogical Drahomanov University, receiving a degree in teacher of Ukrainian language and literature in 1999.

== Career ==
After graduation from University and until 2016, he taught Ukrainian language and literature in the Kyiv Technical School of Electronics.

Until 2012, he worked as an editor for the Stezhka literature journal.

Between 2008 and 2019, he has been an author and a host of the children's TV show, Marichka's Cinema Hall, on the Ukrainian TV channel 1+1.

Since 2006, Dermanskyi is a member of the Ukrainian National Writers Union and a member of the jury for the Platon Voronko Literature Award.

Sashko is one of the scriptwriters for the 2017 film The Stronghold, based on a book by Volodymyr Rutkivskyi.

He published his first poetry for children in the Stezhka literature journal in 2001. Some of his works were published under the pseudonyms of Sashko Volodarskyi and Nazar Dibrova.

In 2004, his first book for children, The Lord of Makutsa or The Adventures of Onysko the Snake (Wolodar makuzi, abo Prigodi wuzha Oniska), was published by Teza publishing house. He published the first of his trilogy A Wonderful Monster (Cudowe cudowisko) in 2006. He has published 41 books in prose with numerous Ukrainian publishing houses, six audiobooks, and interactive story books.

The Ukrainian Ministry of Education recommended that his works (Adventures of Onysko the Garden Snake, Grandma Declares War, A Cow of Time, The Apple Kingdom, The Dance of Chugaistr, Malyaka the Princess of Draconia, The Tales of Dragon Omelko, and Hippos are Not Bears poetry collection) be included in elementary school reading curricula. Also, his work The King of Bouks, or the Mystery of an Emerald Book is included in middle school reading curriculum.

Sashko's works appeal to younger audiences as they contain a great deal of humor, magic, adventures, unexpected plot turns, and lively colorful characters. He is also known for his rich and complex Ukrainian language, use of idioms, and other linguistic attributes that help young readers develop their vocabulary and writing skills.

== Awards ==
- 2005 — The King of the Bouks, or the Mystery of an Emerald Book was awarded by Crown of the Words, the All-Ukrainian books, scripts, and plays competition
- 2006 — a diploma from the Portal International Assembly of Science Fiction Writers
- 2007 — The Apple Kingdom was awarded the first prize of the "Children's Portal" literature, competing in the category "Books for 9-12 year olds” and second prize at the "Golden Stork" literature competition
- 2010 — Marvelous Monster in the Land of the Horror Monsters won first place in the Book of the Year 2010, an all-Ukrainian rating under the category "Children’s Celebration"
- 2015 — Malyaka the Princess of Draconia received an honor award for being nominated in the Best Book under the category Chapter Books for 5-9 year old readers
- 2015 — a poetry book Hippos are not Bears won first place in the category “Children’s Poet of the Year” organized by the BaraBooka Children's Books Ukrainian project;
- 2016 — Malyaka and the Mad Dragon and Malyaka and Disastermoose received first prize in all-Ukrainian literature competition “Book of the year 2016” under the category “Children’s Celebration” (subcategory “Books for younger audiences”)
- 2018 — Mary (Мері, published by A-BA-BA-GA-LA-MA-GA Publishing House) won "BBC Book of the Year 2018" competition in the category BBC Children's Books, presented by BBC News Ukraine in partnership with the Cultural Programme of the European Bank for Reconstruction and Development
- 2019 — Arctic Hives was one of three finalists of the “EsressoTV. Readers’ Choice” award
- 2020 — International Board on Books for Young People (IBBY) included the book Merry on the IBBY Honor List
- 2020 — Weird Poetry and Limericks won Poetry of the Year awards by the BaraBooka Children's Books Ukrainian project
- 2021 — Nominated for Astrid Lindgren Memorial Award (ALMA)
- 2022 — "Aunt Mallow's Pastry Shop" won first place in the All-Ukrainian rating "Book of the Year 2021" in the category “Children’s Celebration”
- 2022 — Nominated for Astrid Lindgren Memorial Award (ALMA)
- 2023 — Nominated for Astrid Lindgren Memorial Award (ALMA)

== Works ==
Dermanskyi published 41 books in Ukrainian and one translated into Lithuanian, six audiobooks and two interactive books

- Adventures of Onysko the Garden Snake (Teza Publishing 2004, 2007, 2009, 2011, 2016)
- The King of the Bouks and the Mystery of the Emerald Book (Teza Publishing 2005, 2012) audiobook Teza Publishing 2009)
- Grandma Declares War (Teza 2006, 2011)
- Marvelous Monster (2006, 2008, 2009, 2011, 2013, 2014, 2015, 2016) As of 2022, the book was published 19 times in Ukraine
- Sashko Dermanskyi about Avicenna, Aleksandr Suvorov, Oleksandr Dovzhenko, Walt Disney, and Pelé (Grani-T, 2006, Lives of Extraordinary Children series)
- The Dance of Chugayst (Teza, 2008, 2012)
- The Apple Kingdom (Teza 2008, 2012)
- Marvelous Monster in the Land of Horror Monsters (2006, 2021)
- Cow of Time (Teza 2010)
- Tale of Dragon Omelko (A-BA-BA-GA-LA-MA-GA Publishing House 2012)
- Marvelous Monster and Horrendous Villain, (A-BA-BA-GA-LA-MA-GA Publishing House, 2010, 2014)
- Aunt Mallow's Pastry Shop (The Old Lion Publishing House, 2014),
- Hippos are not Bears (poetry) (Fontan Kazok 2015)
- Malyaka the Princess of Draconia (Teza 2015)
- Malyaka and Mad Dragon (Teza 2016)
- Malyaka and Disastermoose (Teza 2016)
- A Gazillion Misfortunes of Ostap Kvitochka (A-BA-BA-GA-LA-MA-GA 2016)
- Ghost's Birthday (Fontan Kazok, 2017)
- When Onysko was a Little Snake (Teza 2017)
- Fairy Tales about Everything in the World (Ranok 2017)
- A Handful of Warmth for Mama (The Old Lion Publishing House 2017)
- Malyaka and Big Manya (Teza 2017)
- Merry (A-BA-BA-GA-LA-MA-GA, 2018)
- Kazka. Searching for Yourself (Teza, 2019)
- Arctic Hive (Ranok 2019)
- Malyaka and Crocochew (Teza 2020)
- Limericks (Krokus 2020)
- Weird Poetry (Talant, 2020)
- Vikusya's Stories (2020)
- The Night Khrul (Portal 2020)
- The Choice Day (Portal 2020)
- Kazka. The Magic Voice " (Vivat 2020), in collaboration with Anton Siyanika
- Funny Poetry (Shkola 2020)
- Aunt Mallow's Pastry Shop (A-BA-BA-GA-LA-MA-GA Publishing House, 2022)
- Three Fairy Tales (Nash Format 2021)
- Ghost's Birthday (Nash Format 2021)
- Unsolvable Tasks, in collaboration with Kuzka Kuzyakin (Yakaboo Publishing 2021)
- About Everything in the World for Little Kids (Shkola 2021)
- I'm Waiting for Mykolay (Litera 2021)
- Adventures of Onysko the Garden Snake (A-BA-BA-GA-LA-MA-GA 2021)
- Malyaka the Princess of Draconia (Shkola 2022)
- Malyaka and Mad Dragon (Shkola 2023)
- Wow! Said the Hedgehog (Vivat 2023)
- Ghost's Birthday (The Old Lion Publishing House 2023)
- Grandma Declares War (A-BA-BA-GA-LA-MA-GA 2023)
- New Adventures of Onysko the Garden Snake or Cow of Time (A-BA-BA-GA-LA-MA-GA 2023)
- Rescued Club. Not So Warm and Fuzzy Stories (Vivat 2023)
- A Frog Was Climbing a Ladder (The Old Lion Publishing 2023)
- Merry, Illustrated edition, (Magura 2024)

Works translated into foreign languages

- Merė in Lithuanian (Alma Littera 2022, Lithuania)
- Marvelous Monster in English (2024)
- Merry in English (2024)
- Malyaka the Princess of Draconia in English (2024)
- When Onysko was a Little Snake in English (2024)
- Essay of war "What's Right with us?" (Meridian, 2023)

Multimedia editions

- Adventures of Onysko the Garden Snake interactive audiobook (2009)
- The King of the Bouks and the Mystery of the Emerald Book audiobook (2009)
- Grandma Declares War interactive audiobook (2009)

Book Series:

Onysko the Garden Snake Series

- When Onysko was a Little Snake (2017)
- Adventures of Onysko the Garden Snake (2004, 2007, 2009, 2011, 2016)
- Grandma Declares War (2006, 2009, 2011)
- A Cow of Time (2010)

Marvelous Monster Trilogy

- Marvelous Monster (2006–2022)
- Marvelous Monster in the Land of the Horror Monsters (2006–2021)
- Marvelous Monster and the Horrendous Villain (2010 – 2021)

Malyaka series

- Malyaka the Princess of Draconia (2015)
- Malyaka and the Mad Dragon (2016)
- Malyaka and Disastermoose (2016)
- Malyaka and Big Manya (2017)
- Malyaka and Crocochew (2020)
