= Brusnytsia =

Village in Chernivtsi Oblast, Ukraine

Brusnytsia Брусниця
- Village
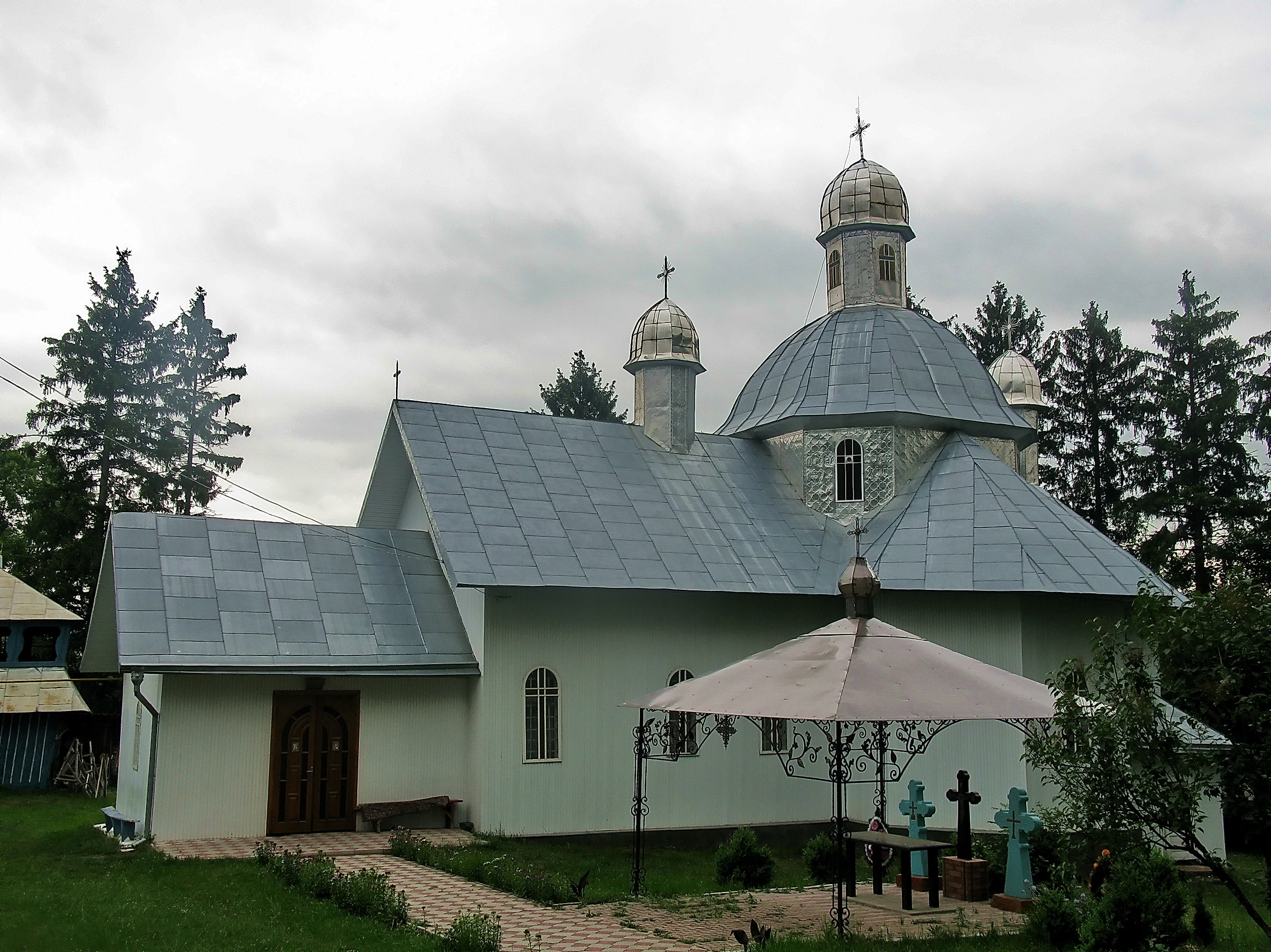
- Church of the Assumption of the Virgin Mary in Brusnytsia

- Location of Brusnytsia in Chernivtsi Oblast Location of Brusnytsia in Ukraine
- Coordinates: 48°20′58″N 25°35′51″E
- Country: Ukraine
- Oblast: Chernivtsi Oblast
- Raion: Vyzhnytsia Raion
- First mentioned: 17th century

Brusnytsia (Ukrainian: Брусниця; Romanian: Brusnița), known until 1946 as Barbivtsi (Ukrainian: Барбівці; Romanian: Berbești; German: Berbestie), is a village in Vyzhnytsia Raion, Chernivtsi Oblast, in western Ukraine. It is the administrative centre of Brusnytsia rural hromada, one of the hromadas of Ukraine. Its population is 2,088 (as of 2024).

== History ==
The original name of Brusnytsia, Barbivtsi, likely descends from the Latin word barbus, which refers to the Barbel fish species. A popular local legend offers the alternative origin that it comes from the surname Barbir. The village's current name is from the Brusnytsia river.

Brusnytsia was first mentioned in the late 17th century, although archaeological evidence shows that it had already existed for centuries prior. The village was part of Austria upon its annexation of Bukovina in 1774, and Austrian rule brought new development over the centuries, including a church and a school. The village was part of the Kingdom of Romania during the interwar period and World War II, excluding a brief period when it was ruled by the Soviet Union from 1940 to 1941 following the Soviet occupation of Bessarabia and Northern Bukovina. The Ukrainian Insurgent Army operated in the village during and after the war, fighting both the Romanian and Soviet governments.

== Landmarks ==
Brusnytsia includes several landmarks, including a park, the wooden Church of the Assumption of the Virgin Mary. A sanatorium also exists in the village.

== Notable residents ==
- Tetiana Dziuba, writer, literary critic, journalist, and translator.
- Isidore Goresky, Canadian farm labourer, teacher and politician.
- Yevhen Savchuk, conductor and composer.
- Sydir Terletskyi, stage actor and director.
