= Nicholas Melnyk =

Canadian politician

Nicholas A. Melnyk

Member of the Legislative Assembly of Alberta
- In office June 18, 1959 – June 17, 1963
- Preceded by: Nick Dushenski
- Constituency: Willingdon
- In office June 17, 1963 – August 30, 1971
- Succeeded by: District Abolished
- Constituency: Willingdon-Two Hills

Personal details
- Born: May 22, 1912
- Died: November 10, 1973 (aged 61)
- Party: Social Credit

Nicholas A. Melnyk (May 22, 1912 – November 10, 1973) was a provincial politician from Alberta, Canada. He served as a member of the Legislative Assembly of Alberta from 1959 to 1971 sitting with the Social Credit caucus in government.

== Political career ==
Melnyk ran for a seat to the Alberta Legislature for the first time in the Willingdon electoral district for the 1955 Alberta general election. He was defeated by incumbent Nick Dushenski in the second count. He ran for the second time in the 1959 Alberta general election and won, this time with a landslide majority to pick up the district for Social Credit.

The 1963 boundary redistribution saw Willingdon redistributed to become Willingdon-Two Hills. Melnyk ran for re-election in the new district for the election held that year. He won another large majority to take the new seat for his party.

Melnyk ran for a third term in office in the 1967 Alberta general election. He faced a hotly contested straight fight against NDP candidate Louis Souter. Melnyk held his seat beating his opponent by a margin of almost 900 votes. He retired from provincial office at dissolution of the assembly in 1971.
