= The Stronghold (2017 film) =

2017 adventure film

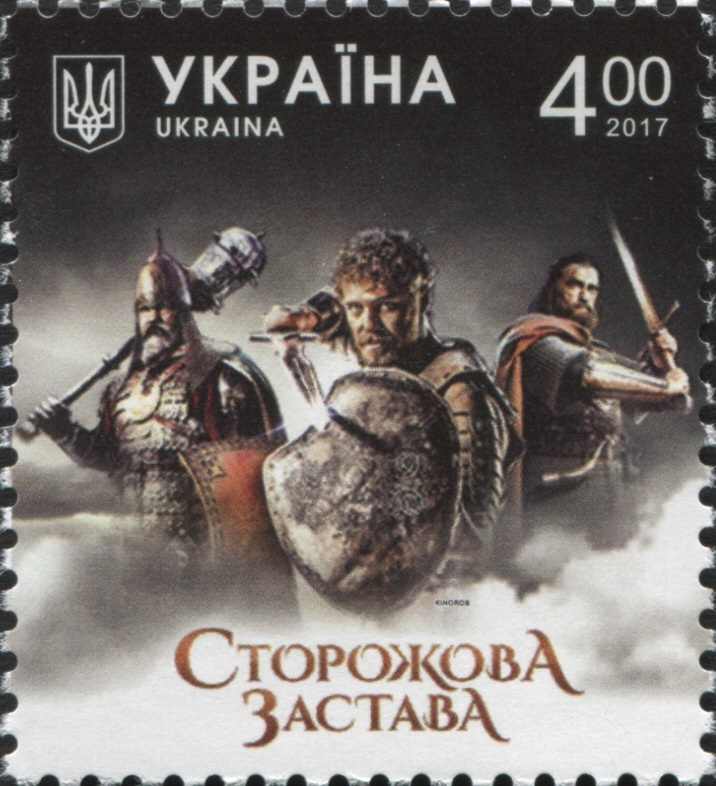
- A Ukrainian postage stamp issued to coincide with the film
- Directed by: Yuriy Kovalyov
- Written by: Olexander Dermanskyi; Yaroslav Voytseshek
- Based on: The Stronghold («Сторожова застава») by Volodymyr Rutkivskyi
- Produced by: Egor Olesov; Yuriy Prylypko
- Starring: Danylo Kamenskyi; Yeva Kosheva; Roman Lutskyi; Oleh Voloshchenko; Heorhiy Derevianskyi; Oleksandr Komarov; Stanislava Krasovska; Nataliya Sumska
- Cinematography: Yuriy Korol
- Distributed by: UFD
- Release date: 12 October 2017
- Running time: 100 minutes
- Country: Ukraine
- Languages: Ukrainian (dubbing); Russian (dubbing)
- Budget: ₴40m

The Stronghold (Ukrainian: «Сторожова́ заста́ва», romanized: Storozhova zastava) is a Ukrainian fantasy adventure film based on the eponymous book by Volodymyr Rutkivskyi and directed by Yuriy Kovalyov. Produced by Egor Olesov and Yuriy Prylypko, the film was released in Ukraine on 12 October 2017. The film is about Victor, a present-day schoolboy, who goes a thousand years into the past.

== Cast ==
- Danylo Kamenskyi as Viktor
- Yeva Kosheva as Olenka
- Roman Lutskyi as Oleshko
- Oleh Voloshchenko as Illya
- Oleksandr Komarov as Dobrynya
- Heorhiy Derevianskyi as Old man Ovsiy
- Stanislava Krasovska as Rosanka
- Nataliya Sumska as Mylanka
- Yerzhan Nurymbet as Andak
- Yerbolat Tohuzakov as Shaman
- Ivan Denysenko as Tugarin

== Production ==
The Stronghold is the debut full-length feature film of director Yuriy Kovalyov.

The book of the same name by Volodymyr Rutkivskyi was adapted into a screenplay by Sashko Dermanskyi and Yaroslav Voitseshek. Costume designer Antonina Belinska said that it had taken her one month to create costume sketches. "We have done painstaking work studying historical sources and consulted both with historians and reenactors quite widely. After that, we added some details to enhance the image and features, and based on all of that we created our characters' costumes", added Ms. Belinska.

The film shoot began in November 2015 on the Olexa Dovbush Cliffs in the Carpathians, in Korostyshiv open pit, Teterivskyi Kish (Teteriv Warcamp) ecospace and in Bucha, as well as on the Film.ua film set with the massive scenery of the Stronghold itself built specially for the production. The filming continued in spring 2016.

It was an acting debut both for Danylo Kamenskyi and Yeva Kosheva starring in the film.

The film's budget was ₴40 million.

Post-production, СGI and VFX have been done by a Ukrainian studio Postmodern.

== Release ==
February 2015: film rental usage rights sold to France during the European Film Market at Berlin International Film Festival. March 2016: The Stronghold film was sold for screening distribution on the territory of India, Vietnam and Malaysia during the Hong Kong International Film & TV Market (FILMART).

March 29, 2016: the presentation of The Stronghold and the first press-conference of the authors and the cast took place at the Film.ua studio where the official film teaser was presented. Also, the release date and the distributor in Ukraine were announced.

The TV premiere will be aired on Novyi Kanal on 14 April 2018.

== Links ==
- Official website (in Ukrainian)
- Сторожова застава on Facebook (in Ukrainian)
- Сторожова застава at IMDb
