= Dara Korniy =

Ukrainian writer

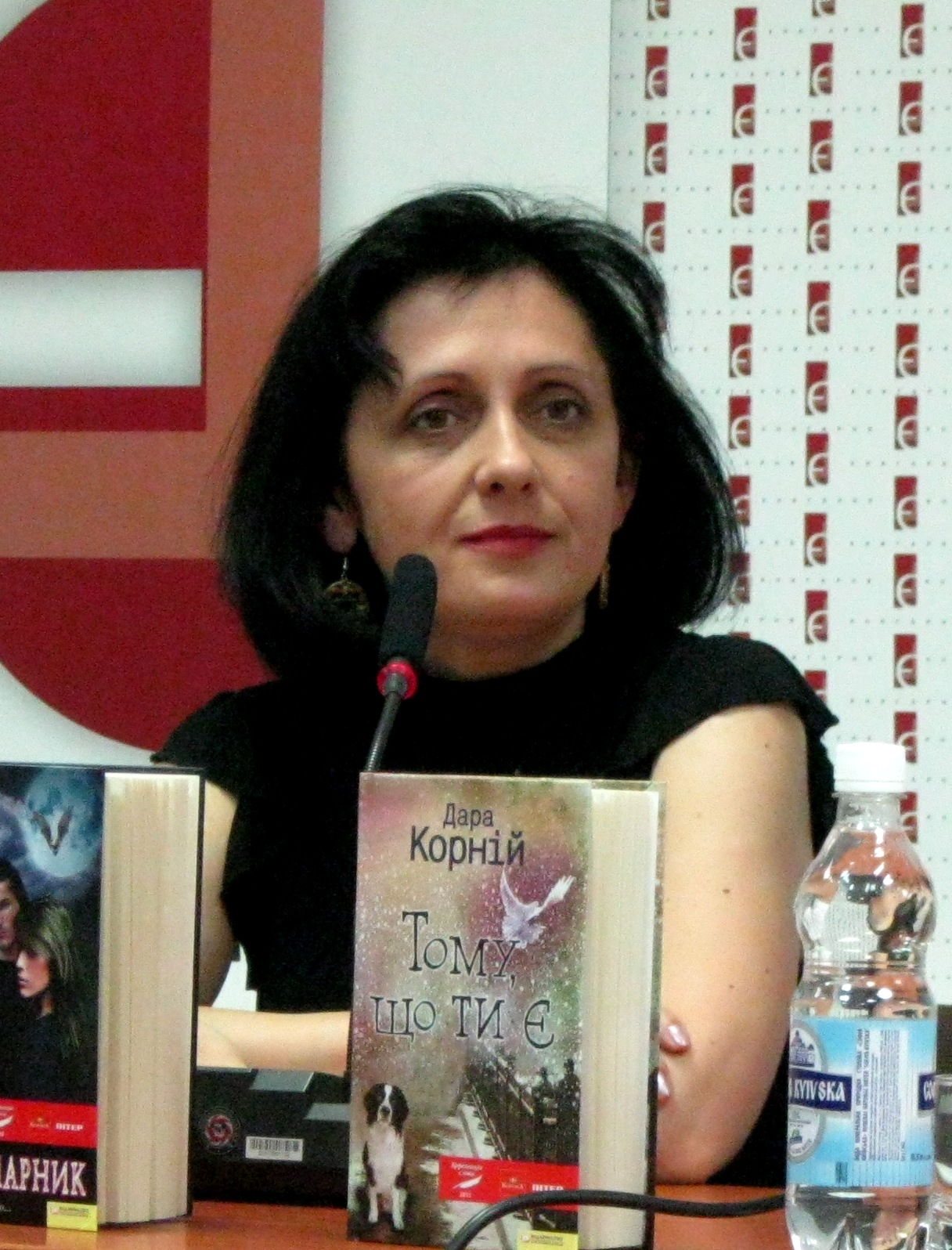
- Born: Myroslava Ivanivna Zamoiska; 20 September 1970 (age 55); Sekun, Ukrainian SSR, Soviet Union
- Occupation: Writer

Myroslava Ivanivna Zamoiska (Ukrainian: Мирослава Іванівна Замойська), known by her pen name Dara Korniy (Ukrainian: Дара Корній), is a Ukrainian writer of urban fantasy.

== Biography ==
Korniy was born in the village of Sekun, in the Kovel Raion, Volyn Oblast. She graduated from Knyazhe Village High School, Lviv Oblast. She obtained higher education in Lviv, graduating from the editorial journalism department of the Ukrainian Academy of Printing. She works at the Lviv National Academy of Arts.

Korniy lives in Lviv. She has two children, Daryna and Maxym.
