= Dmytro Nytczenko =

Ukrainian-Australian writer (1905–1999)

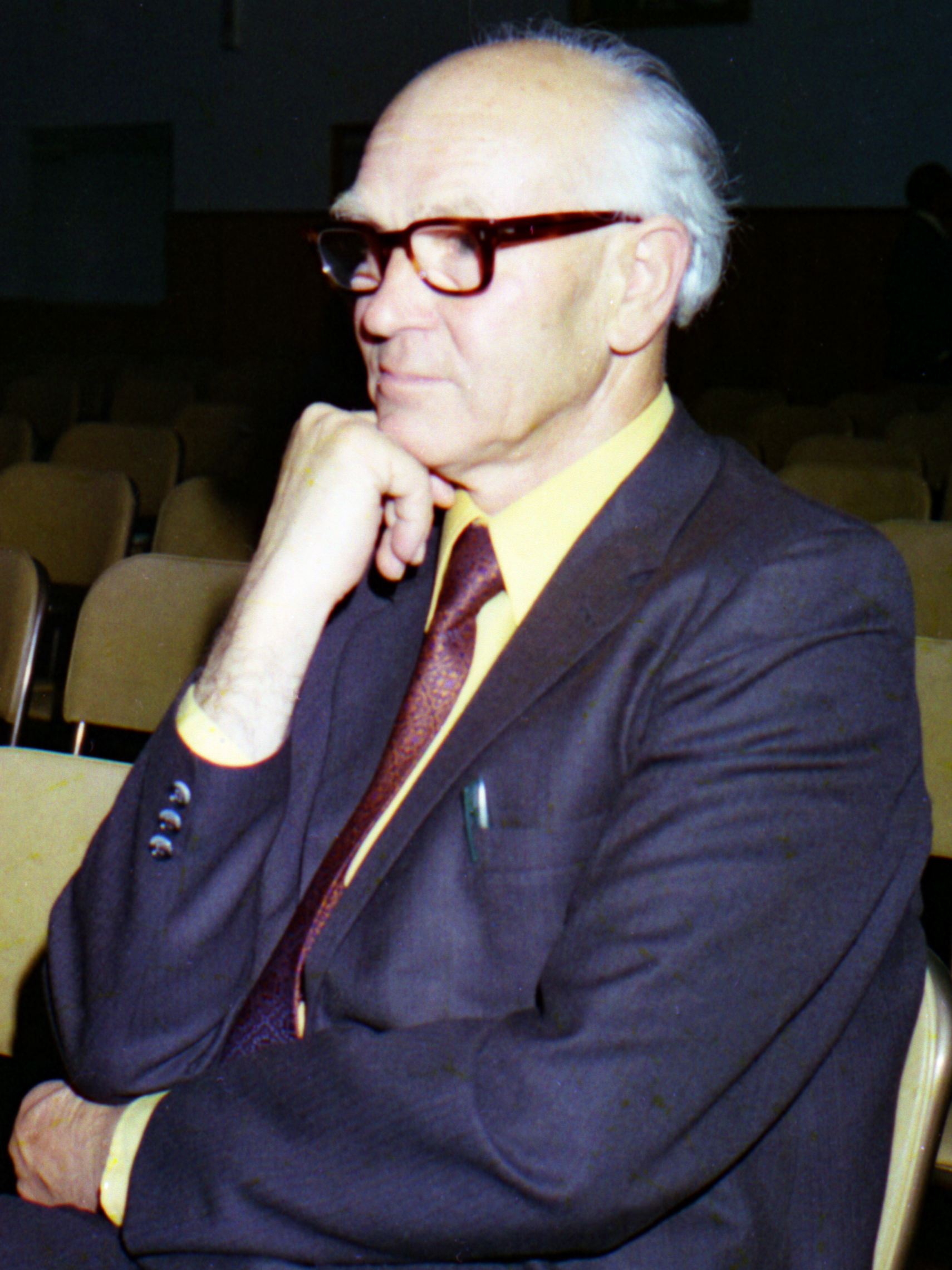
Dmytro Nytczenko in 1978

Dmytro Nytczenko (Ukrainian: Дмитро Нитченко; literary pseudonyms: Dmytro Chub or Ostap Zirchasty; February 21, 1905 – May 27, 1999) was a Ukrainian literary critic, novelist, memoirist, editor, literary researcher, teacher, and social activist who lived and worked in Australia.

He was a laureate of the Skovoroda and Volodymyr Antonovych Prizes, and a member of the Writer's Union of Ukraine.

== Personal life ==
Nytczenkowas born in Zinkiv, Poltava, Ukraine on February 21, 1905, and died on May 27, 1999, in Melbourne, Australia.

== Vasyl Symonenko Club of Victoria ==
In the 1954 Dmytro Nytczenko was the initiator, and then President of the Ukrainian Vasyl Symonenko Club of Victoria whose main objectives was educational, literary and cultural activities, including seminars. Membership was open only to active and reputable authors and artists. Over 100 literary recitals and 'author's evenings' were held until 1995. This association also paid particular attention to younger writers, organising recitals for them and holding "Young Writers" creative writing competitions, for which it awarded monetary prizes.

== Publishing and editing work ==
One of Nytczenko's most important activities was the editing and production of Novy Obriy (Ukrainian: Новій обрій—The New Horizon), a literary almanac published approximately every five years, beginning in 1954. Subtitled 'Literature, Art, Cultural Life', it remains the most significant journal and record of Ukrainian-Australian literary culture of the Ukrainian diaspora in Australia during the period of the second half of the 20th century.

Nytczenko also compiled two anthologies: a collection of poetry entitled Z-pid evkaliptiv: poems (Ukrainian: З-під евкаліптів—From Under the Gumtrees: Poetry) published in 1976; and On the Fence: An Anthology of Ukrainian Prose in Australia (translated into English by Yuri Tkach in 1985). In 1980 an anthology of poetry was published in Adelaide by the local association, the Language and Literature Group of Adelaide, entitled Pivdenny khrest (Ukrainian: Південний хрест—Southern Cross).

== Other works ==
- Chub D. (1953). Tze Trapylos v Avstraliyi (Це трапилось в Австралії—It Happened in Australia), Arncliffe, NSW. Illus. Short stories. (in Ukrainian)
- Chub D. (1953). Na Hadyuchomu Ostrovi (На гадючому острові—On Snake Island), Lastivka Press, Melbourne. (in Ukrainian)
- Chub D. (1954). Vovchenia (Вовченя—The Wolf Cub) (in Ukrainian)
- Chub D. (1958). V Lisakh Pid Viaz'moiu: spohay pro druhu svitovu viinu (В лісах під Вязмою: спогади про другу світову війну—In the Forests of Viazma: Memoirs from World War II), Dniprova Khvylia, Munich. (in Ukrainian)
- Nytczenko, D. (1968). Ukrayinsky pravopysny slovnyk (Український правописний словник—Ukrainian Orthographic Dictionary), Lastivka, Melbourne (in Ukrainian)
- Chub D. (1975). Stezhkamy pryhod (Стежками пригод—On Paths of Adventure), Prosvita, Melbourne (in Ukrainian)
- Nytczenko, D. (1979). Theory of Literature and the Science of Stylistics (Елементи теорії літератури і стилістики), 2nd revised edition, Lastivka Press, Melbourne. ISBN 0-9595837-0-X (in Ukrainian)
- Chub D. (1983). West of Moscow (memories of World War II and German prisoner-of-war camps), Lastivka Press, Newport, Melbourne ISBN 0-949617-02-4
- Chub D. (1983). How Moscow Russifies Ukraine. Melbourne: Lastivka Press. p. 49. ISBN 0-9496170-1-6.
- Nytczenko, D. (1985). On the Fence: an anthology of Ukrainian prose in Australia, Lastivka Press, Melbourne.
- Nytczenko, D. (1985). Ukrainian Orthographic Dictionary (Український ортографічний словник) ISBN 0-949617-07-5 (in Ukrainian)
- Chub D. (1990). From Zinkiv to Melbourne (Від Зінькова до Мельборну), Volume 1 Bayda Book, Melbourne. a chronicle of author's life in Ukraine, Germany & arrival in Australia. 0908480245 / ISBN 0-908480-24-5, ISBN 978-0-908480-24-1
- Nytczenko, D. & Lazorksky, M. (1990). Svitotini: zbirnyk istorychykh narysiv, opovidan, stattei, spohadiv, 1949–1969, (Lights and Shadows: a collection of historical essays, short stories, articles and recollections), Slovo, Melbourne.
- Nytczenko, D. (1994). Under the Sun of Australia, Volume 2, Bayda Books, ISBN 978-0-908480-27-2 (in Ukrainian)
- Nytczenko, D. (2003). Liudyna ideyi (Людина ідеї—A Man Driven by an Idea), memoirs of family & friends about Ukrainian emigre writer from Australia, Kyіv
