= Banyliv =

Coordinates: 48°22′N 25°21′E

Banyliv (Ukrainian: Банилів; Romanian: Bănila pe Ceremuș; German: Russisch Banilla) is a village in Vyzhnytsia Raion, Chernivtsi Oblast, Ukraine. It hosts the administration of Banyliv rural hromada, one of the hromadas of Ukraine.

== History ==
Banyliv is one of the oldest villages in Bukovyna.

The first recorded mention of the village dates back to the year 1433, documented in a charter issued by Alexander the Good, the Voivode of Moldavia. The original name of the settlement is believed to have derived from the word ban, possibly referring to small-denomination coins or payments collected by the Turks at a local guard post, reflecting early Ottoman fiscal practices in the region.

An alternative theory suggests that the name originates from the word ban (/ˈbɑːn/), a title historically used in Slavic and Balkan regions to mean “governor” or “viceroy.” The title ban was held by local rulers or officials in several Central and Southeastern European states from the 7th to the 20th century. Although not of Turkish origin and not part of the Ottoman administrative system, the title continued to be used in regions under Ottoman suzerainty.

Prehistory

The earliest settlements on the site of Ruskyi Banyliv (former name until September 1946) are attributed to the Trypillia culture, dating back over 5,000 years. On the territory of the village, remnants of several ancient settlements have been discovered, for example, in the locality of the Korytnytsia River, traces of the Trypillian presence have been identified. Additionally, evidence of an Iron Age settlement dating to the first century B.C. has been found, along with Roman coinage from the second century A.D.

At the Historical Museum of Banyliv, visitors can see artifacts such as scrapers, stone axes, hand adzes, and arrowheads that reflect this rich archaeological heritage.

Under the Principality of Moldavia

With the establishment of the Principality of Moldavia in 1359, the village (then known as Ruskyi Banyliv), along with the rest of Bukovina, became part of the principality, marking its integration into what is recognized as a historic region of Moldavia, later forming part of modern Romania.

During this period, many areas of Bukovina, including Banyliv, were contested in conflicts between Moldavian forces and Polish authorities, who controlled the lands north of Bukovina. Under Moldavian rule, the social structure of Bukovina consisted primarily of the boyar class (landowners and administrators) and the peasantry. The villagers were divided into three groups: a small number of free citizens, a minority of slaves, mainly Roma and Tatars, and the majority who were serfs (kripaky). These serfs were bound to the land, lacking the right to relocate independently, and were transferred along with the estate upon change of ownership.

From 1514 to 1774, Bukovina came under Ottoman suzerainty, although the preexisting feudal social order largely persisted. Villagers were subordinated either to monastic estates or secular landlords. Following the Habsburg annexation in the late eighteenth century, reforms modified the feudal system. Notably, the 1766 statute known as the “Zolota Hramota” (“Golden Charter”) formalized peasant obligations, requiring tenant-serfs to render one-tenth of their annual harvest and provide twelve days of unpaid labor to their landlords.

In Banyliv, remnants of this period endure in local memory and infrastructure, such as the so-called 'Turkish' road and watchtower that still stand today.

Under Austro-Hungarian rule

In 1775, the Habsburg Empire annexed the northwestern portion of Moldavia, including Banyliv, establishing the region known as Bukovina.

At the time, Banyliv consisted of two sectors: Verkhnyi (Upper) and Nyzhnyi (Lower) Banyliv. Its territory extended primarily between the Cheremosh River and its tributary, the Mlynivka, and in 1775, it was home to 197 families, including 187 peasant households, 6 families of mazyls (petty landowners), and 4 priestly families.

Under Austrian administration, however, the feudal system intensified despite regulations like the 'Zolota Hramota'. Landlords imposed extra obligations beyond legal requirements: horse-owning peasants were forced into construction labor and firewood supply, while others owed a tenth of their harvest, a chicken, and a length of yarn. These demands led to widespread poverty and a landless class.

This exploitation persisted after the 1788 decree granting hereditary land rights, which failed to improve distribution. Instead, large landowners expropriated communal forests and meadows, escalating land pressure. By 1847, extreme inequality was stark: 19 landlords held 3,458 yochs (≈1,990 ha) of prime land, while 769 village families collectively subsisted on just 5,058 yochs (≈2,910 ha) - this translates to just 6.6 yochs (3.8 ha) per family, with an average household size of 5-6 persons. This systemic exploitation drove residents to join Lukian Kobylytsia’s uprising against feudal abuses. Although Austrian forces brutally crushed the revolt, it catalyzed the abolition of serfdom in 1848.

Mike (Mykhailo) Hawreliak and his family, first-generation immigrants from Ruskyi Banyliv, settled in Alberta, Canada

Yet this reform failed to resolve the fundamental land crisis - the core resource defining peasant existence, later immortalized in Olha Kobylianska’s well known novel Zemlya (Land, 1902). By 1865, landlessness in Banyliv surged from 30 families (1847) to 141 (1865), while smallholders owning ≤2 yochs (≤1.15 ha) grew from 125 to 230 families, and those holding 2–5 yochs (1.15 - 2.88 ha) rose from 130 to 194, still below the 5-yoch (2.88 ha) threshold for self-sufficiency.

Ultimately, this unsustainable pressure triggered mass emigration to countries such as Canada, the USA, and others.

From 1899 to 1914, around of 502 individuals emigrated from Banyliv to East Central Alberta, Canada.

School, Ruskyi Banyliv, 1911

Other key developments in Banyliv during the late 19th century:

1856 – An elementary school was built, marking the beginning of formal education in the village. Among its students was Ivan Doshchivnyk (Дощівник Іван Тимофійович), a noted writer, educator, and public figure of Bukovina.

1869 – A post office was established, connecting Banyliv to the wider communication network.

1880 – Weekly Wednesday bazaars were authorised.

1882 – the Assumption Church (historically Orthodox and now part of the Orthodox Church of Ukraine) was built, physically and symbolically connecting Verkhnyi (Upper) and Nyzhnyi (Lower) Banyliv.

A Ukrainian People's Home reading-house. Ruskyi Banyliv, 1904

Late 1890s – Construction of the Nepolokivtsi–Vyzhnytsia railway began, with a station opened in the village.

1904 – A Ukrainian People's Home reading-house (хата-читальня) was built, serving as a center of cultural life, education, and Ukrainian national identity.

One of the notable and historically documented facts is Yuriy Fedkovych’s visit to the village of Banyliv in 1867. His visit was part of a broader educational and cultural mission, as he actively promoted the development of Ukrainian language, culture, and education in Bukovina. As recorded in the 1902 travelogue "In the Footsteps of Fedkovych (Za slїdamy Fedʹkovycha: Notes from a Walk through Bukovina)"/"За слїдами Федьковича (записки з прогулянки по Буковині)" by Roman Zaklynskyi/Роман Заклинський, some villagers already knew Fedkovych prior to his visit, having met him during their military service in the Austrian army, particularly during the 1859 campaign of the Second Italian War of Independence, when Austria fought against the allied forces of France and the Kingdom of Sardinia in Northern Italy.

The period of World War I (1914–1918)

Based on documented accounts in The Story of the Great War, Volume VI, the village of Banyliv, situated along the Cheremosh River, occupied a vulnerable position during World War I. In August 1916 and July 1917, the region experienced repeated Austro-German offensives and Russian withdrawals, with nearby towns such as Kuty, Verkhovyna (old name Zhabie ), Vyzhnytsia, and Yablunytsia appearing prominently in operational reports. Although Banyliv itself is not mentioned by name, its geographic location places it squarely within the broader zone of military activity. It is therefore historically reasonable to conclude that Banyliv stood on or near the front line and endured the disruption and hardship that accompanied shifting control and military operations in Bukovina.

This conclusion is supported by eyewitness accounts, which recall fighting over the bridge across the Cheremosh River in the part of Banyliv known locally as Piket. Though absent from official wartime reports, these testimonies indicate that the village likely witnessed direct combat, consistent with its strategic position in a heavily contested sector during the 1916–1917 campaigns.

Many men from the village were recruited into the Austro-Hungarian army. Among those who served in the Ukrainian Sich Riflemen’s Legion were also several women. One notable example is Olena Kuz, who was born in Banyliv and took part in the legion’s activities. In recognition of her contribution, a bust was unveiled in her honor on 14 October 2014 in the courtyard of the local school.

Under Romanian rule and West Ukrainian People's Republic

Following the collapse of Austria-Hungary in 1918, Bukovina experienced a brief period of political uncertainty. For several weeks, Banyliv, situated in Northern Bukovina, fell under the authority of the Ukrainian Bukovina Executive Committee, which sought unification with the West Ukrainian People's Republic. On 3 November 1918, the Ukrainian Bukovina Viche in Chernivtsi voiced its opposition to Romanian annexation. Despite this, between November and December 1918, Romanian military forces occupied the region, including Chernivtsi and surrounding districts. As a result of these developments, and following the failure of the Ukrainian War of Independence, Northern Bukovina, including Banyliv, was formally incorporated into the Kingdom of Romania, a status internationally recognized under the Treaty of Saint-Germain-en-Laye in 1919.

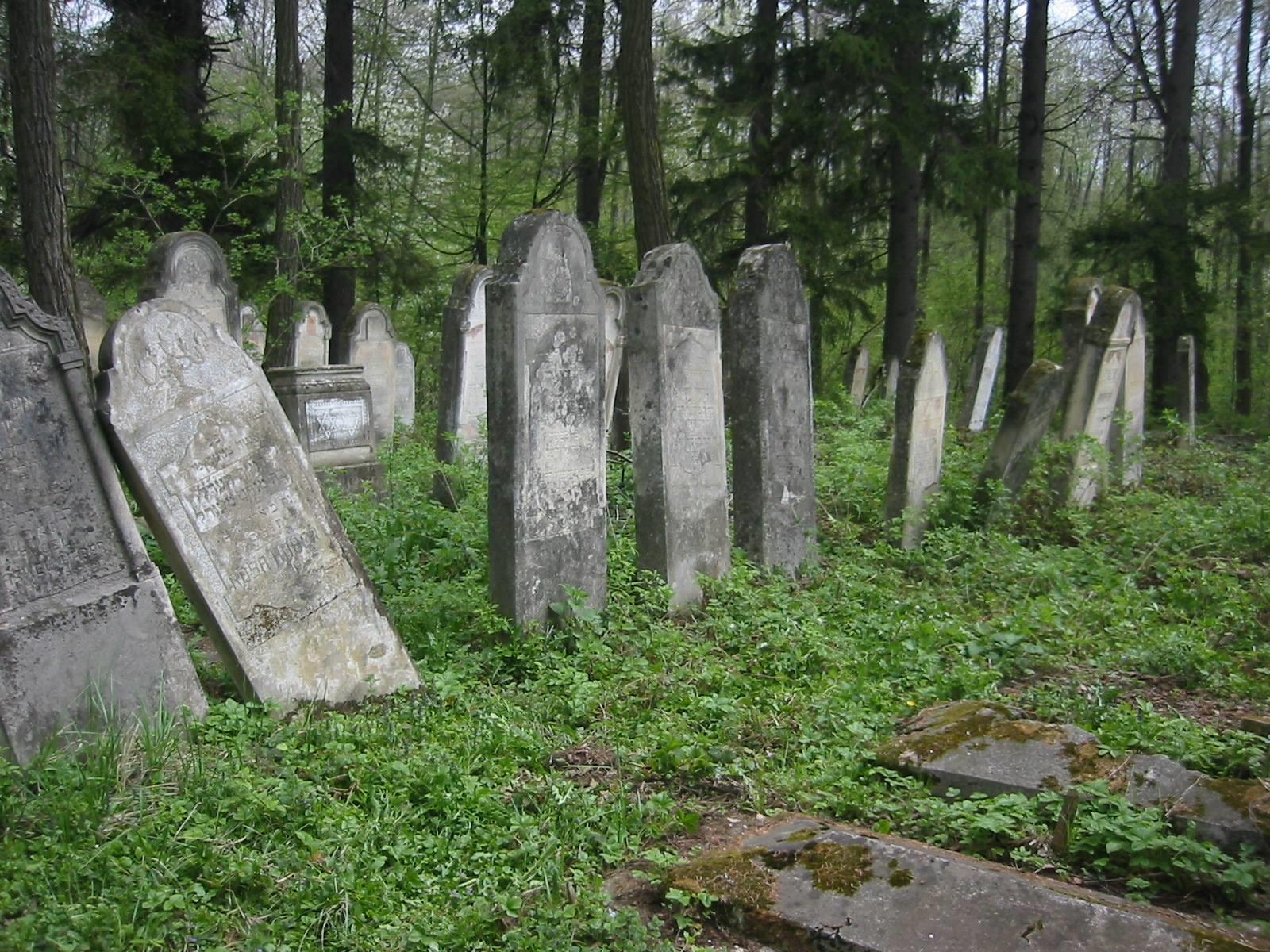
Banyliv Jewish cemetery

Between 1919 and 1923, Romanian authorities initiated a systematic policy of Romanianisation, targeting the educational system and civil administration in Northern Bukovina. Individuals lacking proficiency in the Romanian language were dismissed from public service positions. Given Banyliv’s location along the northern boundary between Galicia and Bukovina, its population at the time was predominantly composed of Ruthenians (the historical designation for Ukrainians), alongside minorities of Poles, Jews, and Armenians. Archival and demographic records from the period do not indicate the presence of a Romanian population in the village.

Taking into account the demographic reality that Banyliv had no Romanian population at the time, the implementation of Romanian-only policies in education and public administration between 1919 and 1923 reflects a clear case of forced assimilation. The dismissal of individuals lacking Romanian language proficiency from civil service, alongside the suppression of Ukrainian-language education, constituted systematic ethnolinguistic discrimination. These measures were not isolated but part of a broader project of nation-building through cultural suppression, aimed at integrating Northern Bukovina into a centralized Romanian national identity, often at the expense of the local population’s linguistic, cultural, and institutional autonomy.

In 1925, under Romania’s Administrative Unification Law, Bukovina lost its provincial status and historical autonomy. The territory was reorganized into five administrative counties: (rom.) Cernăuți, Storojineț, Rădăuți, Suceava, and Câmpulung. As part of this restructuring, the area encompassing Banyliv, along with former Vashkivtsi and Vyzhnytsia counties, was incorporated into Storojineț County, which was governed directly from Bucharest.

Starting from 1928, assimilationist measures temporarily eased under the moderate government led by the National Peasants’ Party (Partidul Național-Țărănesc, PNȚ), which aimed to improve relations with minority groups. Supported by minority parties, including the Ukrainian National Party, this political alliance created a brief window for Ukrainian cultural and educational activities.

Members of the Ukrainian People's Home in Ruskyi Banyliv

As a result, in November 1928, a community theatre group was founded in Banyliv by Myroslav Ivanytskyi, enthusiastically joined by local residents. The group performed numerous plays by Ukrainian authors, including "U nedilyu rano zillya kopala" (On Sunday Morning She Gathered Herbs) by Olha Kobylianska, "Natalka Poltavka" by Ivan Kotliarevsky, and "Svatannia na Honcharivtsi" (The Courtship at Honcharivka) by Hryhorii Kvitka-Osnovianenko. The group was highly popular, and nearly all residents of the village came to see their performances.

In 1930, a men’s Orthodox church choir was established in Banyliv under the direction of Ivan Menzak.

However, the relative cultural openness of the late 1920s and early 1930s came to an abrupt end in 1938, when King Carol II established a royal dictatorship, dissolving all political parties and ending Romania’s parliamentary democracy. The regime centralized authority and implemented stricter nationalist policies, reflecting broader authoritarian trends in Europe. Minority institutions, such as Ukrainian schools, publications, and cultural associations, faced renewed restrictions or were outright banned. Influenced by rising fascism, Romanian nationalism intensified, promoting a culturally homogenous state and increasingly viewing minority rights as a threat to national unity.

World War II and the Era of Soviet Domination

The Second World War engulfed Banyliv, situated within Northern Bukovina, in 1940 following Soviet annexation. Although this region fell outside the explicit territorial spheres delineated in the Molotov-Ribbentrop Pact’s secret protocols (August 23, 1939), the Soviet Union presented Romania with an uncompromising ultimatum on June 26, 1940. This demand mandated the immediate cession and military evacuation of both Bessarabia and Northern Bukovina. Facing imminent invasion and granted only twenty-four hours to respond, the Romanian government acceded under duress. Consequently, Romanian administration withdrew swiftly from Northern Bukovina (including Banyliv) by June 28, 1940, placing the town under Soviet control as part of the newly formed Chernivtsi Oblast.

At the beginning of its rule, the Soviet authorities sought to gain the support of the rural population of Northern Bukovina by creating an illusion of liberation. Propaganda slogans such as “land to the peasants” and “freedom to the working people” were widely circulated in an effort to win over Ukrainian villagers.

However, this was soon followed by the compilation of lists of so-called 'kulaks' ("kurkuli") and active villagers, whom the new regime viewed as socially dangerous. Many were convicted without trial or deported along with their families.

On June 13, 1941, the first mass deportation from Banyliv took place. People were first forcibly taken to the nearest town - Vashkivtsi, where the heads of families were separated from their wives and children by force and placed in separate freight cars. They were then deported to the most remote regions of the USSR: the Komi ASSR, Kazakh SSR, Primorsky and Khabarovsk Krais, as well as the Molotov, Tomsk, Omsk, and Tyumen regions.

Monument to the victims of the Holocaust in Banyliv

Just days later, on June 22, 1941, Romania officially joined the Axis invasion of the Soviet Union, coinciding with Nazi Germany’s launch of Operation Barbarossa. By 5 July 1941, the village of Banyliv had already been occupied by Romanian-German forces. Archival sources reveal that in the first days of the occupation, 139 people were killed in the villages of Yizhivtsi, Budenets, Banyliv, and Nova Zhadova (Storozhynets district). Several dozen families were deported to concentration camps in Transnistria.

By mid-April 1944, Soviet forces had reoccupied Northern Bukovina during the Uman–Botoșani Offensive (2nd Ukrainian Front), forcing Romanian and German troops to withdraw. This military operation restored Soviet administration over the region, which was later formalized by the 1947 Paris Peace Treaty.

After the return of Soviet power, new waves of deportations swept through the region, continuing until 1950. Starting from 1941, the Soviet authorities deported 388 people from the village of Banyliv without the right to return. Besides deportations, the Soviet regime used interrogations, torture, and raids against the local population whenever there were suspicions of cooperation with OUN, Organization of Ukrainian Nationalists.

Nevertheless, approximately three hundred residents of the village of Banyliv were conscripted into the Soviet army in 1944. Of these, 44 were killed in action, and 25 were reported missing.

During the times of repression and lawlessness under shifting occupation regimes, many families in Banyliv sheltered people fleeing unjust persecution from neighboring villages. The names of these brave residents, who placed humanity above the instinct for self-preservation, have largely remained unknown. In Soviet times, even mentioning such acts could lead to arrests.

However, there were others, those who, driven by envy or hatred, engaged in denunciations, cooperated with the new authorities, and took part in the looting of farms, torture, and killings alongside NKVD agents. In the village, they were called “stripky” or “strybky.” They were also known as “extermination battalions” (istrebitel’nye bataliony), armed units created by the Soviet NKVD from the local population to suppress so-called “enemies of Soviet power.”

True history is not only about heroism and sacrifice, but also about fear, envy, and betrayal. Silence does not diminish evil. On the contrary, only by acknowledging it can we learn from it. Only by remembering who and why someone chose cruelty can we better understand the value of humanity. And it is this understanding that helps us avoid repeating the mistakes of the past.

After September 7, 1946, Ruskyi Banyliv was officially called "Banyliv".

Although many hoped the war's end would ease suffering, Northern Bukovina, including Banyliv village, faced devastation during the 1946-1947 famine. These hardships were largely caused by wartime destruction, forced Soviet collectivization, and compulsory grain requisitions.

The process of establishing kolkhozes (колгосп) in the village of Banyliv began as early as 1940, but was completed only in 1950, when several farms were merged, including the neighboring village of Berezhnytsia. This is how the Yuriy Fedkovych Kolkhoz came into being, with a total land area of 3,673 hectares. For the next sixteen years, collective farmers there worked under the trudoden (трудодень) system, compensated through annual shares of harvests rather than cash. That changed abruptly on December 1, 1966, with mandated monetary wages for kolkhoz labor.

In 1967, a three-story school opened in Banyliv and continues to serve the community today.

During the USSR’s involvement in the Soviet-Afghan War (1979–1989), residents of Banyliv village were among those conscripted from across Soviet republics to serve in the Soviet Army.

In 1978 the folk ensemble "Banylivska Toloka" was founded under the artistic direction of Vasyl Mazuryak. It has since performed at district, regional, national and international events.

The ensemble won the All-Ukrainian Folk Festival of Amateur Arts in Kyiv every year from 1991 to 2001.

In 1994 'Banylivska Toloka' received the title of 'People's Amateur Collective' (Narodnyi). Since then it has taken part in every International Hutsul Festival.

Independence

Since 1991, Banyliv has been a part of an independent Ukraine.

== Demographics ==
In 1871, the population of Banyliv was 3,686, and by 1900, this number had increased to 5,152. Following two world wars, famine, and significant changes in family policies during the Soviet era, the population of the village never recovered to its early 20th-century levels. By 1969, Banyliv had a population of 3,555 residents In 2001, the village of Banyliv had a population of 3,897 residents. According to the Banyliv community, the population of the village stood at 3,668 as of 2025.
