= Andrew Shandro (politician) =

Canadian politician (1886–1942)

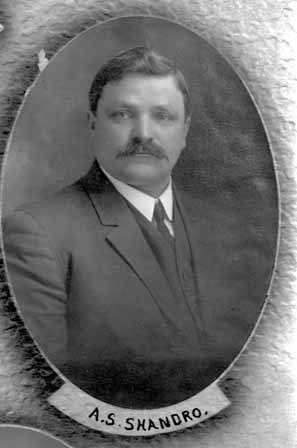

Member of the Legislative Assembly of Alberta
- In office 1913–1922
- Succeeded by: Mike Chornohus
- Constituency: Whitford

Personal details
- Born: April 3, 1886 Ruskiy-Banyliw Bukowina
- Died: January 13, 1942 (aged 55) Edmonton, Alberta, Canada
- Party: Liberal
- Spouse(s): Rose Hawrelak, Olga Kraft
- Relations: Tyler Shandro (Great-Nephew)
- Children: seven, including Wanda
- Occupation: farmer

Andrew Stefan Shandro (April 3, 1886 – January 13, 1942), was a Ukrainian-born Canadian politician. In 1913 he became the first Ukrainian Canadian to serve in the Alberta Legislature.

== Early life ==
Andrew Stefan Shandro was born April 3, 1886, in Ruskiy-Banyliw Bukowina to Stefan Shandro and his wife, Anastasia (née Ostashek). He was a member of the Ukrainian Orthodox Church of Canada. His grandfather was a judge and an uncle was a general in the Austro-Hungarian army. He emigrated to Canada in 1899 with his parents from the Austro-Hungarian Empire and settled northeast of Andrew, Alberta near the North Saskatchewan River. He became a prominent farmer and was postmaster of Shandro, Alberta, a rural community that bore his family's name. In 1905 he married Rose Hawrelak, daughter of Nicoli Hawrelak of Bukowina; they had six children. Shandro was educated at Edmonton Business College and became a Dominion Lands Act federal homestead inspector in 1907. In the summer of 1916, he married Olga Kraft in Winnipeg. Olga was the youngest daughter of Leontania Kraft and her husband William (deceased), who had immigrated to Manitoba from what would become Poland after 1918. Andrew and Olga had one daughter named Wanda, making Andrew’s total number of children seven. Andrew and Olga’s long divorce, was completed in 1937.

== Political life ==
Shandro ran for the Alberta legislature as a Liberal candidate in the riding of Whitford in the general election of 1913. He won, defeating three opponents including Paul Rudyk, but the election was declared void by the courts. Supreme Court of Alberta Justice James Hyndman finding Shandro guilty of bribery and personal corruption under the Controverted Elections Act, 1907 for payments by himself and his brother Alexander Shandro to two individuals to induce electors to vote for Shandro, and barred Shandro from contesting a provincial or municipal election for a period of eight years. Shandro successfully appealed the ban on contesting elections, with the Supreme Court en banc decision written by Justice Nicolas Dubois Dominic Beck finding Shandro was still guilty of bribery, but not of corrupt practices, and reversed the ban on contesting elections. He was re-elected in the resulting by-election on March 15, 1915. Paul Rudyk brought civil charges against Shandro resulting from an incident during the election where Shandro had Rudyk arrested on charges of forging a letter from Liberal Attorney General Charles Wilson Cross. Rudyk was using the letter during his campaign as evidence of support for his candidacy from the ruling Liberal government, which included a statement "Wishing you every success in the coming election, and with best regards". Shandro filed criminal charges against Rudyk, to which he was arrested and the charges subsequently dismissed. In the civil action Rudyk was awarded $1,200 and costs by Justice David Lynch Scott, who found Shandro did not have reasonable grounds for the charges and acted out of "express malice".

During the 3rd Legislature, the assembly passed An Act amending The Election Act respecting Members of the Legislative Assembly on Active Service (Bill 58) which acclaimed members of the assembly in the 1917 election who were serving in armed forces during the First World War. The Act listed eleven members of the assembly and provided those members were deemed nominated and elected as a member of the 4th Alberta Legislature, effectively being acclaimed in the 1917 election, including Andrew Shandro, who served as a lieutenant in the Canadian Expeditionary Force during the war. Shandro's acclamation was controversial as he was placed in the 218th Battalion for recruiting purposes and was not to be shipped overseas to see combat. Shandro wore an officer's uniform into the legislature prior to his appointment which led to a letter from the district commanding officer to cease wearing the uniform. Shandro did not follow the order and continued to wear the uniform in public for over a month.

In the 1921 election Shandro was technically re-elected by acclamation for Whitford after the nomination papers of the United Farmers of Alberta (UFA) candidate had been rejected. The returning officer declared Shandro the winner after the UFA candidates name was misspelled. John Robert Boyle, the Attorney General, wired the returning officer stating the government did not wish the seat to be uncontested due to a spelling mistake and stated it was his opinion that the election take place. After the election yielded a UFA government, his election result was appealed. The court declared the election void and a by-election was held July 10, 1922. Shandro was defeated, the previously-barred UFA candidate winning the seat.

Shandro contested the 1926 and 1935 elections, without success.

== Later life ==
Shandro would be charged in 1940 with stealing four cash grain tickets and "uttering" the documents knowing them to be forged. He was acquitted by the Supreme Court of Alberta in May 1940.

His great-nephew Tyler Shandro was the Member of the Legislative Assembly of Alberta for Calgary-Acadia from 2019 to 2023.

== See also ==
- Ukrainian Cultural Heritage Village
- List of Canadian place names of Ukrainian origin

== Sources ==
- MacGregor, J.G. (1969). Vilni Zemli (Free Lands) : The Ukrainian Settlement of Alberta. Toronto: McClelland & Stewart Ltd.
- Edmonton Journal, 14 Jan, 1942, p. 3.
- Edmonton Journal, 12 Apr, 1937, p. 9.
- The Vancouver Sun, 8 May 1943, p. 15.
- Edmonton Journal, 22 Apr 1931, p. 19.

Legislative Assembly of Alberta
Preceded by New District	MLA Whitford; 1913–1922	Succeeded by Mike Chornohus
