= Whitford, Alberta =

Whitford
- Hamlet
- Location of Whitford Whitford (Canada)
- Coordinates: 53°52′21″N 112°12′53″W
- Country: Canada
- Province: Alberta
- Region: Central Alberta
- Census division: 10
- Municipal district: Lamont County

Government
  - Type: Unincorporated
  - Governing body: Lamont County Council

Population (1981)
  - Total: 6
- Time zone: UTC−06:00 (Alberta Time)
- Area codes: 780, 587, 825

Whitford is a hamlet in central Alberta, Canada within Lamont County. It is located 1 kilometre (0.62 mi) west of Highway 45, approximately 68 kilometres (42 mi) northeast of Fort Saskatchewan. The first school was built in 1895 with John and Andrew Whitford as trustees.

== Demographics ==
Whitford recorded a population of 6 in the 1981 Census of Population conducted by Statistics Canada.

== See also ==
- List of communities in Alberta
- List of hamlets in Alberta
