= Stony Plain (electoral district) =

Defunct provincial electoral district in Alberta, Canada

Coordinates: 53.53°N 114.01°W

Alberta electoral district
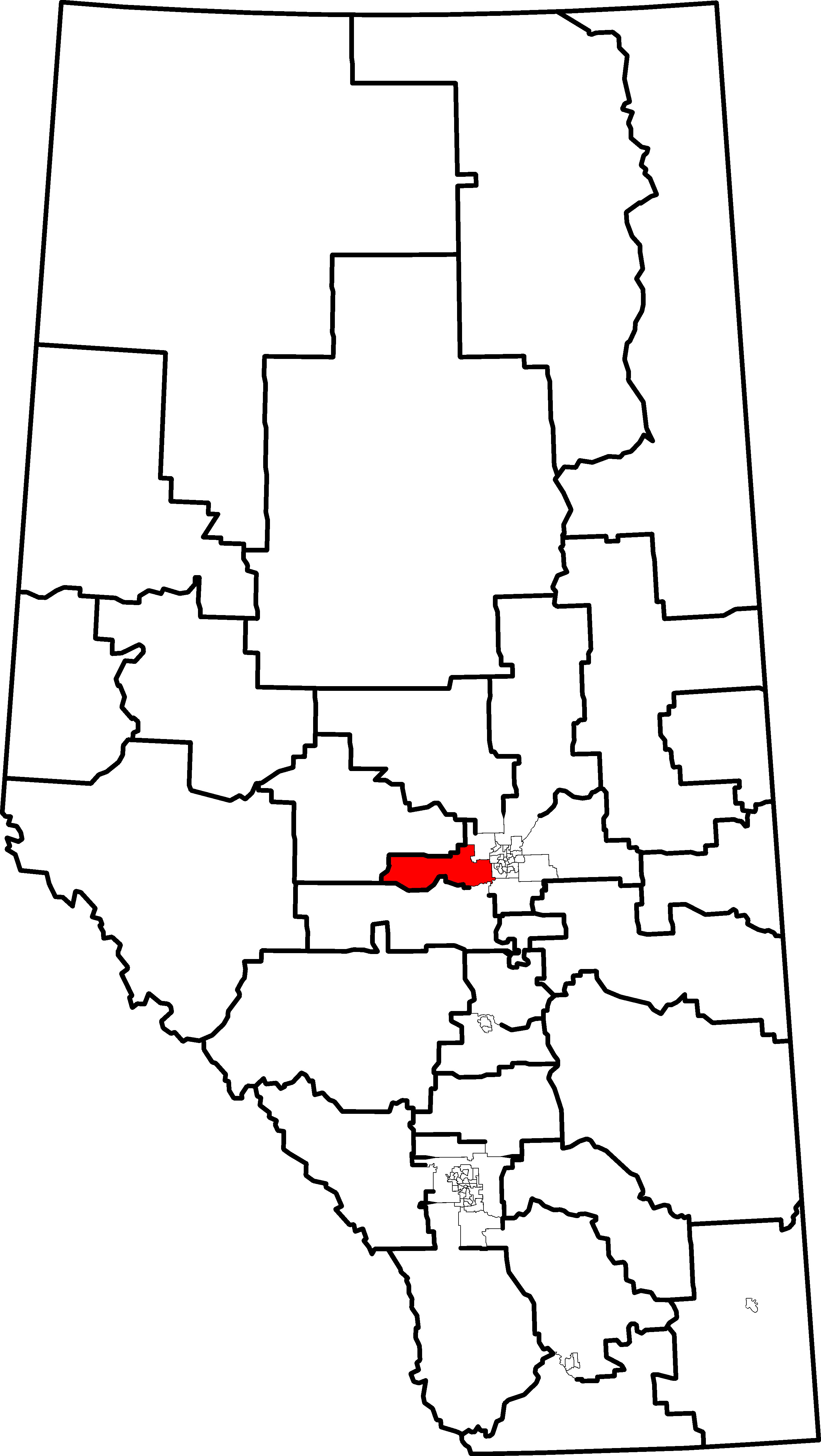
- 2010 boundaries

Defunct provincial electoral district
- Legislature: Legislative Assembly of Alberta
- District created: 1905
- District abolished: 2019
- First contested: 1905
- Last contested: 2015

Stony Plain (named Stonyplain until 1909) was a provincial electoral district in Alberta, Canada, between 1905 and 2019. The district returned a single member to the Legislative Assembly of Alberta throughout its history, using the first past the post method of voting for most of its existence but single transferable vote from 1926 to 1957. The district was created in 1905 when Alberta became a province. The riding in its original boundaries stretched from the west Edmonton city limits to the British Columbia border, but over time it was significantly reduced in size.

== History ==
Stony Plain was founded as Stonyplain, one of the original 25 electoral districts contested in the 1905 Alberta general election upon Alberta joining Confederation in September 1905. It was renamed Stony Plain for the 1909 Alberta general election, retaining this name until its abolition. The original boundaries of the riding took it to the British Columbia from west Edmonton city limits, but over the next hundred years the riding was significantly decreased in area to a small fraction of its former size.

The 2010 electoral boundary re-distribution saw the riding transfer land north of Highway 16 to the electoral district of Whitecourt-Ste. Anne. In the 2017 re-distribution, the riding was abolished, with the town of Stony Plain moved to Spruce Grove-Stony Plain and the rural areas transferred to Lac Ste. Anne-Parkland and Drayton Valley-Devon. The area continued to be represented in the Legislative Assembly until the 2019 election, when new riding borders took effect.

=== Boundary history ===
77 Stony Plain 2003 boundaries
Bordering districts
| North | East | West | South |
|---|---|---|---|
| Spruce Grove-Sturgeon-St. Albert, Whitecourt-Ste. Anne | Edmonton-Calder, Edmonton-Meadowlark, Edmonton-McClung, Edmonton-Whitemud, Leduc-Beaumont-Devon | Whitecourt-Ste. Anne | Drayton Valley-Calmar |
| riding map goes here | | | |
Legal description from the Statutes of Alberta 2003, Electoral Divisions Act
Starting at the intersection of the right bank of the Pembina River and the north boundary of Twp. 54; then 1. east along the north boundary to the east boundary of Sec. 33 in Twp. 54, Rge. 6 W5; 2. south along the east boundary of Secs. 33, 28, 21, 16, 9 and 4 in the Twp. and the east boundary of Secs. 33 and 28 in Twp. 53, Rge. 6 W5 to the north shore of Isle Lake; 3. in a generally northeasterly direction along the north shore to the north boundary of Twp. 53; 4. east along the north boundary to the east boundary of Sec. 32 in Twp. 53, Rge. 5 W5; 5. south along the east boundary to the north boundary of Sec. 28 in the Twp.; 6. east along the north boundary of ecs. 28, 27, 26 and 25 in the Twp. and the north boundary of Secs. 30, 29, 28, 27, 26 and 25 in Twp. 53, Rges. 4 and 3 W5 and the north boundary of Secs. 30 and 29 in Twp. 53, Rge. 2 W5 to the east boundary of Sec. 29; 7. south along the east boundary to the north boundary of Sec. 21 in the Twp.; 8. east along the north boundary of Secs. 21, 22, 23 and 24 in the Twp. and the north boundary of Sec. 19 in Twp. 53, Rge. 1 W5 to the east boundary of Sec. 30 in the Twp.; 9. north along the east boundary of Secs. 30 and 31 in the Twp. and the east boundary of Secs. 6 and 7 in Twp. 54, Rge. 1 W5 to the north boundary of Sec. 8 in the Twp.; 10. east along the north boundary of Secs. 8, 9, 10, 11 and 12 in the Twp. and the north boundary of Sec. 12 in Twp. 54, Rge. 28 W4 and the north boundary of Secs. 7, 8 and 9 in Twp. 54, Rge. 27 W4 to the east boundary of Sec. 9 in the Twp.; 11. south along the east boundary of Secs. 9 and 4 in the Twp. and the east boundary of Secs. 33, 28, 21, 16 and 9 in Twp. 53, Rge. 27 W4 to the north Spruce Grove city boundary; 12. westerly, southerly, easterly and north along the city boundary to the north boundary of Twp. 52; 13. east along the north boundary to the west Edmonton city boundary; 14. southerly and easterly along the city boundary to the right bank of the North Saskatchewan River; 15. upstream along the right bank to the east boundary of Sec. 21, Twp. 50, Rge. 6 W5; 16. north along the east boundary to the north boundary of Sec. 21; 17. west along the north boundary of Secs. 21 and 20 in the Twp. to the east boundary of Sec. 30 in the Twp.; 18. north along the east boundary to the north boundary of Sec. 30; 19. west along the north boundary to the east boundary of Rge. 7 W5; 20. north along the east boundary to the north boundary of Twp. 50; 21. west along the north boundary to the right bank of the Pembina River; 22. downstream along the right bank of the Pembina River to the starting point.
Note:

81 Stony Plain 2010 boundaries
Bordering districts
| North | East | West | South |
|---|---|---|---|
| Spruce Grove-St. Albert and Whitecourt-Ste. Anne | Edmonton-Meadowlark and Edmonton-South West | Whitecourt-Ste. Anne | Drayton Valley-Devon and Leduc-Beaumont |
Legal description from the Statutes of Alberta 2010, Electoral Divisions Act
Note:

Members of the Legislative Assembly for Stony Plain
| Assembly | Years | Member | Party |
|---|---|---|---|
| 1st | 1905–1909 | John McPherson | Liberal |
| 2nd | 1909–1913 | John McPherson | Liberal |
| 3rd | 1913–1917 | Conrad Weidenhammer | Conservative |
| 4th | 1917–1921 | Frederick Lundy | Conservative |
| 5th | 1921–1926 | Willard Washburn | United Farmers |
| 6th | 1926–1930 | Willard Washburn | United Farmers |
| 7th | 1930–1935 | Donald Macleod | United Farmers |
| 8th | 1935–1939 | William Hayes | Social Credit |
| 8th | 1939–1940 | Vacant | |
| 9th | 1940–1944 | Cornelia Wood | Social Credit |
| 10th | 1944–1948 | Cornelia Wood | Social Credit |
| 11th | 1948–1952 | Cornelia Wood | Social Credit |
| 12th | 1952–1955 | Cornelia Wood | Social Credit |
| 13th | 1955–1959 | John McLaughlin | Liberal |
| 14th | 1959–1963 | Cornelia Wood | Social Credit |
| 15th | 1963–1967 | Cornelia Wood | Social Credit |
| 15th | 1967 | Cornelia Wood | Independent |
| 16th | 1967–1971 | Ralph Jespersen | Social Credit |
| 17th | 1971–1975 | William Purdy | Progressive; Conservative |
| 18th | 1975–1979 | William Purdy | Progressive; Conservative |
| 19th | 1979–1982 | William Purdy | Progressive; Conservative |
| 20th | 1982–1986 | William Purdy | Progressive; Conservative |
| 21st | 1986–1989 | Jim Heron | Progressive; Conservative |
| 22nd | 1989–1993 | Stan Woloshyn | New Democrat |
| 22nd | 1993 | Stan Woloshyn | Progressive; Conservative |
| 23rd | 1993–1997 | Stan Woloshyn | Progressive; Conservative |
| 24th | 1997–2001 | Stan Woloshyn | Progressive; Conservative |
| 25th | 2001–2004 | Stan Woloshyn | Progressive; Conservative |
| 26th | 2004–2008 | Fred Lindsay | Progressive; Conservative |
| 27th | 2008–2012 | Fred Lindsay | Progressive; Conservative |
| 28th | 2012–2015 | Ken Lemke | Progressive; Conservative |
| 29th | 2015–2019 | Erin Babcock | New Democrat |
See Spruce Grove-Stony Plain, Lac Ste. Anne-Parkland, and Drayton Valley-Devon 2019–

=== Electoral history ===
The electoral district of Stony Plain was created when the province was first formed in 1905. It was one of the longest-surviving original districts, remaining intact for every boundary redistribution until 2017.

The first election in 1905 saw a three-way battle which was handily won by Liberal candidate John McPherson, who was reelected in 1909. He was defeated by Conservative candidate Conrad Weidenhammer in 1913, who chose to retire after a single term. Conservative Frederick Lundy won the tight 1917 race to hold the district. He ran again in the 1921 election, but was defeated by United Farmers candidate Willard Washburn in a landslide. Washburn held the district for two terms before retiring in 1930. The United Farmers ran candidate Donald Macleod who held the district in a tight race over Liberal candidate George Bryan.

Macleod was defeated in 1935, finishing a distant third place to Social Credit candidate William Hayes. The seat became vacant when Hayes died on April 2, 1939, and it would not be filled before the 1940 election. Cornelia Wood was nominated to be the Social Credit candidate, who won the district for her party in a tight race that went to ballot transfers. Wood was re-elected for three terms before being defeated by Liberal candidate John McLaughlin in 1955. McLaughlin would be defeated by Wood, who returned to the seat in 1959. The two ran against each other twice more, with Wood coming up the winner each time.

Wood lost her nomination race to run as the Social Credit candidate again in the 1967 general election to Ralph Jespersen. She later left the Social Credit caucus on April 24, 1967, to run as an Independent Social Credit candidate. She would be defeated finishing a distant fourth place in a landslide by Jespersen.

Jespersen would only last a single term in office before being defeated by William Purdy in the 1971 general election. Purdy was re-elected three more times before retiring at dissolution in 1986. His replacement in the legislature was Progressive Conservative candidate Jim Heron, who served one term before being defeated by New Democrat Stan Woloshyn.

Woloshyn only stayed with the NDP caucus for a few years before crossing the floor to the Progressive Conservative caucus on February 23, 1993. He ran for re-election as a Progressive Conservative that year and won. In 1996 Premier Ralph Klein appointed him to the provincial cabinet. He won re-election again in 1997 and 2001 before retiring in 2004.

Fred Lindsay replaced Woloshyn in 2004 as the Progressive Conservative MLA for the riding and was re-elected in 2008. Former mayor Ken Lemke retained the riding for the PCs in the 2012 election. The last person to represent Stony Plain was Erin Babcock, who won the riding for the Alberta New Democratic Party in the 2015 election. At the 2019 election, the first after the riding was abolished, Babcock ran for reelection in the new Spruce Grove-Stony Plain riding, but lost to Searle Turton from the United Conservative Party. Lac Ste. Anne-Parkland and Drayton Valley-Devon, the other ridings to take in parts of the former Stony Plain riding, were also won by United Conservatives.

== Legislative election results ==
=== 1905 ===
1905 Alberta general election
| Party | Candidate | Votes | % | ±% |
|---|---|---|---|---|
| Liberal | John A. McPherson | 354 | 57.94% | – |
| Conservative | Dan Bronx | 187 | 30.61% | – |
| Independent | Conrad Weidenhammer | 70 | 11.46% | – |
| Total | | 611 | – | – |
| Rejected, spoiled and declined | | N/A | – | – |
| Eligible electors / turnout | | N/A | N/A | – |
| Liberal pickup new district. | | | | |
Source(s) Source: "Stony Plain Official Results 1905 Alberta general election". Alberta Heritage Community Foundation.

=== 1909 ===
1909 Alberta general election
| Party | Candidate | Votes | % | ±% |
|---|---|---|---|---|
| Liberal | John A. McPherson | 398 | 43.74% | -14.20% |
| Independent | Dan Bronx | 250 | 27.47% | 16.02% |
| Independent | Charlie R. Cropley | 154 | 16.92% | 5.47% |
| Conservative | John McKinley | 108 | 11.87% | -18.74% |
| Total | | 910 | – | – |
| Rejected, spoiled and declined | | N/A | – | – |
| Eligible electors / turnout | | N/A | N/A | – |
| Liberal hold | | Swing | | -5.53% |
Source(s) Source: "Stony Plain Official Results 1909 Alberta general election". Alberta Heritage Community Foundation.

=== 1913 ===
1913 Alberta general election
| Party | Candidate | Votes | % | ±% |
|---|---|---|---|---|
| Conservative | Conrad Weidenhammer | 577 | 61.06% | 49.19% |
| Liberal | John A. McPherson | 368 | 38.94% | -4.79% |
| Total | | 945 | – | – |
| Rejected, spoiled and declined | | N/A | – | – |
| Eligible electors / turnout | | N/A | N/A | – |
| Conservative gain from Liberal | | Swing | | 2.93% |
Source(s) Source: "Stony Plain Official Results 1913 Alberta general election". Alberta Heritage Community Foundation.

=== 1917 ===
1917 Alberta general election
| Party | Candidate | Votes | % | ±% |
|---|---|---|---|---|
| Conservative | Frederick W. Lundy | 744 | 51.35% | -9.71% |
| Liberal | Francis A. Smith | 705 | 48.65% | 9.71% |
| Total | | 1,449 | – | – |
| Rejected, spoiled and declined | | N/A | – | – |
| Eligible electors / turnout | | N/A | N/A | – |
| Conservative hold | | Swing | | -9.71% |
Source(s) Source: "Stony Plain Official Results 1917 Alberta general election". Alberta Heritage Community Foundation.

=== 1921 ===
1921 Alberta general election
| Party | Candidate | Votes | % | ±% |
|---|---|---|---|---|
| United Farmers | Willard M. Washburn | 1,001 | 50.02% | – |
| Liberal | Jake Miller | 647 | 32.33% | -16.32% |
| Conservative | Frederick W. Lundy | 306 | 15.29% | -36.05% |
| Independent | Dan Brox | 47 | 2.35% | – |
| Total | | 2,001 | – | – |
| Rejected, spoiled and declined | | N/A | – | – |
| Eligible electors / turnout | | N/A | N/A | – |
| United Farmers gain from Conservative | | Swing | | 7.50% |
Source(s) Source: "Stony Plain Official Results 1921 Alberta general election". Alberta Heritage Community Foundation.

=== 1926 ===
This election conducted using instant-runoff voting

1926 Alberta general election
| Party | Candidate | Votes | % | ±% |
|---|---|---|---|---|
| United Farmers | Willard M. Washburn | 759 | 40.72% | -9.31% |
| Liberal | Frederick W. Lundy | 414 | 22.21% | -10.12% |
| Conservative | Richard M. Oatway | 368 | 19.74% | 4.45% |
| Independent Liberal | M. McKinley | 323 | 17.33% | – |
| Total | | 1,864 | – | – |
| Rejected, spoiled and declined | | 203 | – | – |
| Eligible electors / turnout | | 2,997 | 68.97% | – |
| United Farmers hold | | Swing | | 0.41% |
Source(s) Source: "Stony Plain Official Results 1926 Alberta general election". Alberta Heritage Community Foundation.

On the 2nd Count, McKinley was eliminated. Still no candidate had a majority of votes. On the 3rd Count, Oatway was eliminated. Washburn had picked up about 200 votes from the eliminated candidates while Lundy had picked up only 70. so their ranking in popularity did not change. In the 3rd Count, with only two candidates remaining, Washburn had 938 votes; Lundy had 485 votes. Washburn thus had a majority of votes and was declared elected.

=== 1930 ===
This election conducted using Instant-runoff voting

1930 Alberta general election
| Party | Candidate | Votes | % | ±% |
|---|---|---|---|---|
| United Farmers | Donald Macleod | 1,406 | 53.00% | 12.28% |
| Liberal | George J. Bryan | 1,247 | 47.00% | 24.79% |
| Total | | 2,653 | – | – |
| Rejected, spoiled and declined | | 219 | – | – |
| Eligible electors / turnout | | 4,150 | 69.20% | 0.24% |
| United Farmers hold | | Swing | | -6.26% |
Source(s) Source: "Stony Plain Official Results 1930 Alberta general election". Alberta Heritage Community Foundation.

=== 1935 ===
This election conducted using Instant-runoff voting

1935 Alberta general election
| Party | Candidate | Votes | % | ±% |
|---|---|---|---|---|
| Social Credit | William E. Hayes | 2,832 | 59.16% | – |
| Liberal | George J. Bryan | 1,472 | 30.75% | -16.25% |
| United Farmers | Donald Macleod | 312 | 6.52% | -46.48% |
| Conservative | R. C. Johnson | 171 | 3.57% | – |
| Total | | 4,787 | – | – |
| Rejected, spoiled and declined | | 177 | – | – |
| Eligible electors / turnout | | 5,993 | 82.83% | 13.63% |
| Social Credit gain from United Farmers | | Swing | | 11.21% |
Source(s) Source: "Stony Plain Official Results 1935 Alberta general election". Alberta Heritage Community Foundation.

=== 1940 ===
This election conducted using Instant-runoff voting

1940 Alberta general election
| Party | Candidate | Votes 1st count | % | Votes final count | ±% |
|---|---|---|---|---|---|
| Social Credit | Cornelia R. Wood | 1,914 | 44.72% | 2,213 | -14.44% |
| Independent | William J. Connolly | 1,228 | 28.69% | 1,606 | – |
| Co-operative Commonwealth | T. J. Hardwick | 942 | 22.01% | – | – |
| Independent Farmer | George E. Bevington | 196 | 4.58% | – | – |
| Total | | 4,280 | – | – | – |
| Rejected, spoiled and declined | | 168 | – | – | – |
| Eligible electors / turnout | | 6,124 | 72.63% | -10.20% | – |
| Social Credit hold | | Swing | | -6.19% | |
Source(s) Source: "Stony Plain Official Results 1940 Alberta general election". Alberta Heritage Community Foundation. Instant-runoff voting requires a candidate to receive a plurality (greater than 50%) of the votes. As no candidate received a plurality of votes, the bottom candidate was eliminated and their 2nd place votes were applied to both other candidates until one received a plurality

=== 1944 ===
This election conducted using Instant-runoff voting

1944 Alberta general election
| Party | Candidate | Votes | % | ±% |
|---|---|---|---|---|
| Social Credit | Cornelia R. Wood | 2,557 | 65.10% | 20.38% |
| Co-operative Commonwealth | Harold Anderson | 1,371 | 34.90% | 12.89% |
| Total | | 3,928 | – | – |
| Rejected, spoiled and declined | | 48 | – | – |
| Eligible electors / turnout | | 5,683 | 69.96% | -2.67% |
| Social Credit hold | | Swing | | 7.08% |
Source(s) Source: "Stony Plain Official Results 1944 Alberta general election". Alberta Heritage Community Foundation.

=== 1948 ===
This election conducted using Instant-runoff voting

1948 Alberta general election
| Party | Candidate | Votes | % | ±% |
|---|---|---|---|---|
| Social Credit | Cornelia R. Wood | 2,188 | 53.40% | -11.69% |
| Co-operative Commonwealth | Harold Anderson | 1,037 | 25.31% | -9.59% |
| Liberal | William K. Robertson | 872 | 21.28% | – |
| Total | | 4,097 | – | – |
| Rejected, spoiled and declined | | 222 | – | – |
| Eligible electors / turnout | | 6,267 | 68.92% | -1.05% |
| Social Credit hold | | Swing | | -1.05% |
Source(s) Source: "Stony Plain Official Results 1948 Alberta general election". Alberta Heritage Community Foundation.

=== 1952 ===
This election conducted using Instant-runoff voting

1952 Alberta general election
| Party | Candidate | Votes 1st count | % | Votes final count | ±% |
|---|---|---|---|---|---|
| Social Credit | Cornelia R. Wood | 1,991 | 46.62% | 2,177 | -6.79% |
| Co-operative Commonwealth | John M. Evien | 1,218 | 28.52% | 1,530 | 3.21% |
| Liberal | Charles L. Wudel | 1,062 | 24.87% | – | 3.58% |
| Total | | 4,271 | – | – | – |
| Rejected, spoiled and declined | | 345 | – | – | – |
| Eligible electors / turnout | | 6,716 | 68.73% | -0.19% | – |
| Social Credit hold | | Swing | | -5.00% | |
Source(s) Source: "Stony Plain Official Results 1952 Alberta general election". Alberta Heritage Community Foundation. Instant-runoff voting requires a candidate to receive a plurality (greater than 50%) of the votes. As no candidate received a plurality of votes, the bottom candidate was eliminated and their 2nd place votes were applied to both other candidates until one received a plurality

=== 1955 ===
This election conducted using Instant-runoff voting

1955 Alberta general election
| Party | Candidate | Votes | % | ±% |
|---|---|---|---|---|
| Liberal | John Harold McLaughlin | 2,865 | 52.95% | 28.08% |
| Social Credit | Cornelia R. Wood | 1,788 | 33.04% | -13.57% |
| Co-operative Commonwealth | John M. Evien | 758 | 14.01% | -14.51% |
| Total | | 5,411 | – | – |
| Rejected, spoiled and declined | | 427 | – | – |
| Eligible electors / turnout | | 8,173 | 71.43% | 2.70% |
| Liberal gain from Social Credit | | Swing | | 0.90% |
Source(s) Source: "Stony Plain Official Results 1955 Alberta general election". Alberta Heritage Community Foundation.

=== 1959 ===
This election (and all later ones) conducted using First-past-the-post voting

1959 Alberta general election
| Party | Candidate | Votes | % | ±% |
|---|---|---|---|---|
| Social Credit | Cornelia R. Wood | 2,880 | 46.47% | 13.42% |
| Liberal | John Harold McLaughlin | 2,091 | 33.74% | -19.21% |
| Progressive Conservative | Robert K. Clarkson | 1,227 | 19.80% | – |
| Total | | 6,198 | – | – |
| Rejected, spoiled and declined | | 29 | – | – |
| Eligible electors / turnout | | 9,403 | 66.22% | -5.21% |
| Social Credit gain from Liberal | | Swing | | -3.59% |
Source(s) Source: "Stony Plain Official Results 1959 Alberta general election". Alberta Heritage Community Foundation.

=== 1963 ===
1963 Alberta general election
| Party | Candidate | Votes | % | ±% |
|---|---|---|---|---|
| Social Credit | Cornelia R. Wood | 2,716 | 48.18% | 1.72% |
| Liberal | John Harold McLaughlin | 1,065 | 18.89% | -14.84% |
| Progressive Conservative | Peter Germaniuk | 903 | 16.02% | -3.78% |
| Independent Movement | Rudolph Zander | 595 | 10.56% | – |
| New Democratic | Conral D. (Red) Fuhr | 358 | 6.35% | – |
| Total | | 5,637 | – | – |
| Rejected, spoiled and declined | | 868 | – | – |
| Eligible electors / turnout | | 10,445 | 62.28% | -3.94% |
| Social Credit hold | | Swing | | 8.28% |
Source(s) Source: "Stony Plain Official Results 1963 Alberta general election". Alberta Heritage Community Foundation.

=== 1967 ===
1967 Alberta general election
| Party | Candidate | Votes | % | ±% |
|---|---|---|---|---|
| Social Credit | Ralph A. Jespersen | 2,316 | 36.43% | -11.76% |
| New Democratic | Maurice R. McCullagh | 1,855 | 29.18% | 22.82% |
| Progressive Conservative | Frank Flanagan | 1,670 | 26.27% | 10.25% |
| Independent Social Credit | Cornelia R. Wood | 517 | 8.13% | – |
| Total | | 6,358 | – | – |
| Rejected, spoiled and declined | | 31 | – | – |
| Eligible electors / turnout | | 9,838 | 64.94% | 2.66% |
| Social Credit hold | | Swing | | -11.02% |
Source(s) Source: "Stony Plain Official Results 1967 Alberta general election". Alberta Heritage Community Foundation.

=== 1971 ===
1971 Alberta general election
| Party | Candidate | Votes | % | ±% |
|---|---|---|---|---|
| Progressive Conservative | William (Bill) F. Purdy | 3,348 | 48.48% | 22.21% |
| Social Credit | Ralph A. Jespersen | 2,788 | 40.37% | 3.94% |
| New Democratic | Michael Crowson | 770 | 11.15% | -18.03% |
| Total | | 6,906 | – | – |
| Rejected, spoiled and declined | | 44 | – | – |
| Eligible electors / turnout | | 10,098 | 68.83% | 3.88% |
| Progressive Conservative gain from Social Credit | | Swing | | 0.43% |
Source(s) Source: "Stony Plain Official Results 1971 Alberta general election". Alberta Heritage Community Foundation.

=== 1975 ===
1975 Alberta general election
| Party | Candidate | Votes | % | ±% |
|---|---|---|---|---|
| Progressive Conservative | William (Bill) F. Purdy | 5,109 | 63.53% | 15.05% |
| Social Credit | Dean Throness | 1,113 | 13.84% | -26.53% |
| New Democratic | Jim Bell | 923 | 11.48% | 0.33% |
| Liberal | Betty Howery | 628 | 7.81% | – |
| Independent Progressive Conservative | Arthur Killoran | 269 | 3.34% | – |
| Total | | 8,042 | – | – |
| Rejected, spoiled and declined | | 28 | – | – |
| Eligible electors / turnout | | 13,720 | 58.82% | -10.01% |
| Progressive Conservative hold | | Swing | | 20.79% |
Source(s) Source: "Stony Plain Official Results 1975 Alberta general election". Alberta Heritage Community Foundation.

=== 1979 ===
1979 Alberta general election
| Party | Candidate | Votes | % | ±% |
|---|---|---|---|---|
| Progressive Conservative | William (Bill) F. Purdy | 6,927 | 58.94% | -4.59% |
| Social Credit | Oscar Venoasen | 2,274 | 19.35% | 5.51% |
| Liberal | Andy R. McKinnon | 1,250 | 10.64% | 2.83% |
| New Democratic | Sara Johnson | 1,218 | 10.36% | -1.11% |
| Independent Conservative | Eleanor T. Louden | 83 | 0.71% | – |
| Total | | 11,752 | – | – |
| Rejected, spoiled and declined | | N/A | – | – |
| Eligible electors / turnout | | 19,212 | 61.17% | 2.35% |
| Progressive Conservative hold | | Swing | | -5.05% |
Source(s) Source: "Stony Plain Official Results 1979 Alberta general election". Alberta Heritage Community Foundation.

=== 1982 ===
1982 Alberta general election
| Party | Candidate | Votes | % | ±% |
|---|---|---|---|---|
| Progressive Conservative | William (Bill) F. Purdy | 10,210 | 59.77% | 0.83% |
| New Democratic | Jim Bell | 2,905 | 17.01% | 6.64% |
| Western Canada Concept | John G. Parkes | 2,337 | 13.68% | – |
| Independent | Ernie Clintberg | 1,048 | 6.14% | – |
| Social Credit | Ralph Eikeland | 299 | 1.75% | -17.60% |
| Reform | Murray Fuhr | 202 | 1.18% | – |
| Independent | Dick Martens | 80 | 0.47% | – |
| Total | | 17,081 | – | – |
| Rejected, spoiled and declined | | 14 | – | – |
| Eligible electors / turnout | | 25,523 | 66.98% | 5.81% |
| Progressive Conservative hold | | Swing | | 1.59% |
Source(s) Source: "Stony Plain Official Results 1982 Alberta general election". Alberta Heritage Community Foundation.

=== 1986 ===
1986 Alberta general election
| Party | Candidate | Votes | % | ±% |
|---|---|---|---|---|
| Progressive Conservative | Jim P. Heron | 4,535 | 43.63% | -16.15% |
| New Democratic | Rick Hardy | 3,046 | 29.30% | 12.30% |
| Representative | Ernest Clintberg | 1,343 | 12.92% | – |
| Liberal | Ed Wilson | 1,285 | 12.36% | – |
| Western Canada Concept | J. Richard Dougherty | 186 | 1.79% | -11.89% |
| Total | | 10,395 | – | – |
| Rejected, spoiled and declined | | 12 | – | – |
| Eligible electors / turnout | | 21,923 | 47.47% | -19.51% |
| Progressive Conservative hold | | Swing | | -14.22% |
Source(s) Source: "Stony Plain Official Results 1986 Alberta general election". Alberta Heritage Community Foundation.

=== 1989 ===
1989 Alberta general election
| Party | Candidate | Votes | % | ±% |
|---|---|---|---|---|
| New Democratic | Stan Woloshyn | 4,699 | 37.32% | 8.01% |
| Progressive Conservative | Jim P. Heron | 4,604 | 36.56% | -7.06% |
| Liberal | Dan Fitze | 2,732 | 21.70% | 9.33% |
| Social Credit | John Torringa | 557 | 4.42% | – |
| Total | | 12,592 | – | – |
| Rejected, spoiled and declined | | 8 | – | – |
| Eligible electors / turnout | | 22,866 | 55.10% | 7.63% |
| New Democratic gain from Progressive Conservative | | Swing | | -6.78% |
Source(s) Source: "Stony Plain Official Results 1989 Alberta general election". Alberta Heritage Community Foundation.

=== 1993 ===
1993 Alberta general election
| Party | Candidate | Votes | % | ±% |
|---|---|---|---|---|
| Progressive Conservative | Stan Woloshyn | 4,855 | 41.32% | 4.76% |
| Liberal | Albert Schatzke | 4,607 | 39.21% | 17.51% |
| New Democratic | Laurence Johnson | 1,481 | 12.60% | -24.71% |
| Social Credit | Gary Morton | 674 | 5.74% | 1.31% |
| Natural Law | Lois Burger | 133 | 1.13% | – |
| Total | | 11,750 | – | – |
| Rejected, spoiled and declined | | 14 | – | – |
| Eligible electors / turnout | | 19,569 | 60.12% | 5.01% |
| Progressive Conservative gain from New Democratic | | Swing | | 0.68% |
Source(s) Source: "Stony Plain Official Results 1993 Alberta general election". Alberta Heritage Community Foundation.

=== 1997 ===
1997 Alberta general election
| Party | Candidate | Votes | % | ±% |
|---|---|---|---|---|
| Progressive Conservative | Stan Woloshyn | 6,267 | 48.92% | 7.60% |
| Liberal | Peter Marchiel | 3,906 | 30.49% | -8.72% |
| Social Credit | Pat Hansard | 1,742 | 13.60% | 7.86% |
| New Democratic | Felice Young | 895 | 6.99% | -5.62% |
| Total | | 12,810 | – | – |
| Rejected, spoiled and declined | | 20 | – | – |
| Eligible electors / turnout | | 21,383 | 60.00% | -0.11% |
| Progressive Conservative hold | | Swing | | 8.16% |
Source(s) Source: "Stony Plain Official Results 1997 Alberta general election". Alberta Heritage Community Foundation.

=== 2001 ===
2001 Alberta general election
| Party | Candidate | Votes | % | ±% |
|---|---|---|---|---|
| Progressive Conservative | Stan Woloshyn | 9,197 | 67.20% | 18.28% |
| Liberal | Monika Cappis | 3,228 | 23.59% | -6.91% |
| New Democratic | Stephen Lindop | 1,261 | 9.21% | 2.23% |
| Total | | 13,686 | – | – |
| Rejected, spoiled and declined | | 28 | – | – |
| Eligible electors / turnout | | 23,668 | 57.94% | -2.06% |
| Progressive Conservative hold | | Swing | | 12.59% |
Source(s) Source: "Stony Plain Official Results 2001 Alberta general election". Alberta Heritage Community Foundation.

=== 2004 ===
2004 Alberta general election
| Party | Candidate | Votes | % | ±% |
|---|---|---|---|---|
| Progressive Conservative | Fred Lindsay | 5,581 | 44.51% | -22.69% |
| Liberal | Bill Fraser | 3,381 | 26.97% | 3.38% |
| Alberta Alliance | Marilyn Burns | 1,904 | 15.19% | – |
| New Democratic | Ruth Yanor | 1,362 | 10.86% | 1.65% |
| Social Credit | Henry Neumann | 310 | 2.47% | – |
| Total | | 12,538 | – | – |
| Rejected, spoiled and declined | | 44 | – | – |
| Eligible electors / turnout | | 26,086 | 48.23% | -9.71% |
| Progressive Conservative hold | | Swing | | -13.03% |
Source(s) Source: "Stony Plain Official Results 2004 Alberta general election". Alberta Heritage Community Foundation.

=== 2008 ===
2008 Alberta general election
| Party | Candidate | Votes | % | ±% |
|---|---|---|---|---|
| Progressive Conservative | Fred Lindsay | 8,467 | 63.38% | 18.87% |
| Liberal | Bill Fraser | 2,552 | 19.10% | -7.86% |
| New Democratic | Shelina Brown | 976 | 7.31% | -3.56% |
| Wildrose Alliance | Sandy Pariseau | 793 | 5.94% | -9.25 |
| Green | Nora Shea | 571 | 4.27% | – |
| Total | | 13,359 | – | – |
| Rejected, spoiled and declined | | 36 | – | – |
| Eligible electors / turnout | | 29,026 | 46.15% | -2.08% |
| Progressive Conservative hold | | Swing | | 13.37% |
Source(s) Source: "Elections Alberta 2008 General Election". Elections Alberta.

=== 2012 ===
2012 Alberta general election
| Party | Candidate | Votes | % | ±% |
|---|---|---|---|---|
| Progressive Conservative | Ken Lemke | 7,490 | 45.22% | -18.16% |
| Wildrose | Hal Tagg | 6,254 | 37.76% | 31.83% |
| New Democratic | Linda Robinson | 1,324 | 7.99% | 0.69% |
| Liberal | Arlin Biffert | 1,128 | 6.81% | -12.29% |
| Alberta Party | Kurtis Ewanchuk | 217 | 1.31% | – |
| Evergreen | Matthew Burnett | 149 | 0.90% | -3.37 |
| Total | | 16,562 | – | – |
| Rejected, spoiled, and declined | | 77 | – | – |
| Eligible electors / turnout | | 30,316 | 54.89% | 8.74% |
| Progressive Conservative hold | | Swing | | -18.41% |
Source(s) Source: "81 - Stony Plain Official Results 2012 Alberta general election". Elections Alberta.

=== 2015 ===
2015 Alberta general election
| Party | Candidate | Votes | % | ±% |
|---|---|---|---|---|
| New Democratic | Erin Babcock | 7,268 | 37.83% | 29.83% |
| Wildrose | Kathy Rondeau | 5,586 | 29.07% | -8.69% |
| Progressive Conservative | Ken Lemke | 4,944 | 25.73% | -19.49% |
| Liberal | Mike Hanlon | 657 | 3.42% | -3.39% |
| Alberta Party | Sandy Simmie | 538 | 2.80% | 1.49% |
| Green | Matthew Burnett | 220 | 1.15% | 0.25% |
| Total | | 19,213 | – | – |
| Rejected, spoiled and declined | | 66 | – | – |
| Eligible electors / turnout | | 32,852 | 58.68% | 3.80% |
| New Democratic gain from Progressive Conservative | | Swing | | 0.65% |
Source(s) Source: "81 - Stony Plain Official Results 2015 Alberta general election". Elections Alberta.

== Senate nominee election results ==
=== 2004 ===
| 2004 Senate nominee election results: Stony Plain | | | | Turnout 48.33% | |
| Affiliation | Candidate | Votes | % votes | % ballots | Rank |
| Progressive Conservative | Cliff Breitkreuz | 5,469 | 16.67% | 50.51% | 3 |
| Progressive Conservative | Betty Unger | 4,753 | 14.49% | 43.90% | 2 |
| Independent | Link Byfield | 3,783 | 11.53% | 34.94% | 4 |
| Progressive Conservative | Bert Brown | 3,684 | 11.23% | 34.03% | 1 |
| Alberta Alliance | Michael Roth | 2,978 | 9.08% | 27.51% | 7 |
| Alberta Alliance | Gary Horan | 2,690 | 8.20% | 24.85% | 10 |
| Alberta Alliance | Vance Gough | 2,591 | 7.90% | 23.93% | 8 |
| Progressive Conservative | David Usherwood | 2,364 | 7.21% | 21.83% | 6 |
| Progressive Conservative | Jim Silye | 2,322 | 7.07% | 21.45% | 5 |
| Independent | Tom Sindlinger | 2,173 | 6.62% | 20.07% | 9 |
| Total votes | | 32,807 | 100% | | |
| Total ballots | | 10,827 | 3.03 votes per ballot | | |
| Rejected, spoiled and declined | | 1,779 | | | |

Voters had the option of selecting four candidates on the ballot.

== Plebiscite results ==
=== 1948 electrification plebiscite ===
District results from the first province wide plebiscite on electricity regulation:

| Option A | Option B |
|---|---|
| Are you in favour of the generation and distribution of electricity being continued by the Power Companies? | Are you in favour of the generation and distribution of electricity being made a publicly owned utility administered by the Alberta Government Power Commission? |
| 1,360 35.88% | 2,430 64.12% |
Province wide result: Option A passed.

=== 1957 liquor plebiscite ===
1957 Alberta liquor plebiscite results: Stony Plain
Question A: Do you approve additional types of outlets for the sale of beer, wine and spirituous liquor subject to a local vote?
| Ballot choice | Votes | % |
| Yes | 2,372 | 72.01% |
| No | 922 | 27.99% |
| Total votes | 2,864 | 100% |
| Rejected, spoiled and declined | 38 | |
8,663 eligible electors, turnout 38.64%

On October 30, 1957, a stand-alone plebiscite was held province wide in all 50 of the then current provincial electoral districts in Alberta. The government decided to consult Alberta voters to decide on liquor sales and mixed drinking after a divisive debate in the legislature. The plebiscite was intended to deal with the growing demand for reforming antiquated liquor control laws.

The plebiscite was conducted in two parts. Question A, asked in all districts, asked the voters if the sale of liquor should be expanded in Alberta, while Question B, asked in a handful of districts within the corporate limits of Calgary and Edmonton, asked if men and women should be allowed to drink together in establishments.

Province wide Question A of the plebiscite passed in 33 of the 50 districts while Question B passed in all five districts. Stony Plain voted in favour of the proposal by a landslide majority. Voter turnout in the district was well under the province wide average of 46%.

Official district returns were released to the public on December 31, 1957. The Social Credit government in power at the time did not consider the results binding. However the results of the vote led the government to repeal all existing liquor legislation and introduce an entirely new Liquor Act.

Municipal districts lying inside electoral districts that voted against the plebiscite were designated Local Option Zones by the Alberta Liquor Control Board and considered effective dry zones. Business owners who wanted a license had to petition for a binding municipal plebiscite in order to be granted a license.

== Student vote results ==
=== 2004 ===
Participating schools
High Park School
John Paul II School
Muir Lake School
Seba Beach School
St. Johns School of Alberta
St. Thomas Aquinas Catholic High School
Wabamun School

On November 19, 2004, a student vote was conducted at participating Alberta schools to parallel the 2004 Alberta general election results. The vote was designed to educate students and simulate the electoral process for persons who have not yet reached the legal majority. The vote was conducted in 80 of the 83 provincial electoral districts with students voting for actual election candidates. Schools with a large student body who resided in another electoral district had the option to vote for candidates outside of the electoral district then where they were physically located.

2004 Alberta student vote results
| Affiliation | Candidate | Votes | % |
| Progressive Conservative | Fred Lindsay | 297 | 38.27% |
| NDP | Ruth Yanor | 183 | 23.58% |
| Liberal | Bill Fraser | 124 | 15.98% |
| Alberta Alliance | Marilyn Burns | 123 | 15.85% |
| Social Credit | Henry Neumann | 49 | 6.32% |
| Total | | 776 | 100% |
| Rejected, spoiled and declined | | 19 | |

=== 2012 ===
2012 Alberta student vote results
| Affiliation | Candidate | Votes | % |
| Progressive Conservative | Ken Lemke | 329 | 33.43% |
| Wildrose | Hal Tagg | 275 | 27.95% |
| Liberal | Arlin Biffert | 150 | 15.24 |
| NDP | Linda Robinson | 95 | 9.65% |
| Evergreen | Matthew Burnett | 73 | 7.42% |
| Alberta Party | Kurtis Ewanchuk | 62 | 6.30% |
| Total | | 984 | 100% |

=== 2015 ===
2015 Alberta student vote results
| Affiliation | Candidate | Votes | % |
| NDP | Erin Babcock | 480 | 33.50% |
| Wildrose | Kathy Rondeau | 320 | 22.33% |
| Progressive Conservative | Ken Lemke | 228 | 15.91% |
| Liberal | Mike Hanlon | 178 | 12.42% |
| Alberta Party | Sandy Simmie | 126 | 8.79% |
| Green | Matt Burnett | 101 | 7.05% |
| Total | | 1433 | 100% |

== See also ==
- List of Alberta provincial electoral districts
- Canadian provincial electoral districts
- Stony Plain, Alberta, a town in central Alberta
