= Ken Lemke =

Canadian politician

Member of the Alberta Legislative Assembly for Stony Plain
- In office April 23, 2012 – May 4, 2015
- Preceded by: Fred Lindsay
- Succeeded by: Erin Babcock

Mayor of Stony Plain
- In office 2007 – February 22, 2012
- Preceded by: Donna Cowan
- Succeeded by: William Choy

Personal details
- Born: 1951 Ohaton, Alberta
- Died: July 15, 2023 (aged 71–72)
- Party: Progressive Conservative
- Website: Official website

Kenneth Frank Lemke (1951 – July 14, 2023) was a politician from Alberta, Canada. He served as mayor of Stony Plain from 2007 to 2012, and at the provincial level he represented Stony Plain from 2012 to 2015, as a Progressive Conservative.

== Political career ==
Lemke successfully ran for town councillor in 1995. He held this position for four terms, until deciding to take a run for mayor. Lemke was elected mayor of the Town of Stony Plain in 2007, and was acclaimed in 2010.

In November 2011, with Stony Plain MLA Fred Lindsay retiring, Lemke ran for the Progressive Conservative (PC) nomination. In the 2012 election, he won the Stony Plain riding, and successfully made his way into provincial politics. He held the seat until the 2015 election, when he was defeated by New Democrat Erin Babcock.

Lemke died on July 14, 2023, at the age of 72.

2012 Alberta general election: Stony Plain
Party	Candidate	Votes	%	±%
Progressive Conservative	Ken Lemke	7,490	45.22%	-18.16%
Wildrose	Hal Tagg	6,254	37.76%	31.83%
New Democratic	Linda Robinson	1,324	7.99%	0.69%
Liberal	Arlin Biffert	1,128	6.81%	-12.29%
Alberta Party	Kurtis Ewanchuk	217	1.31%	–
Evergreen	Matthew Burnett	149	0.90%	-3.37
Total		16,562	–	–
Rejected, spoiled, and declined		77	–	–
Eligible electors / turnout		30,316	54.89%	8.74%
Progressive Conservative hold		Swing		-18.41%
Source(s) Source: "81 - Stony Plain Official Results 2012 Alberta general election". Elections Alberta.
