= Willard Washburn =

Canadian politician (1875–1961)

Willard Moody Washburn
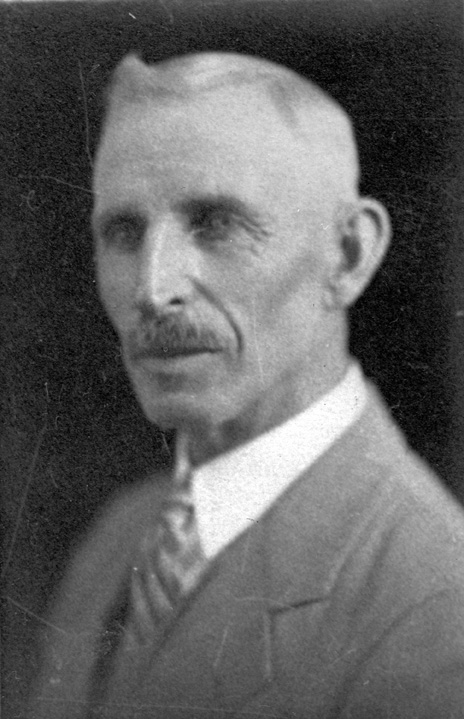

Member of the Legislative Assembly of Alberta
- In office July 18, 1921 – June 19, 1930
- Preceded by: Frederick Lundy
- Succeeded by: Donald Macleod
- Constituency: Stony Plain

Personal details
- Born: September 12, 1875 Argyle, Iowa
- Died: August 16, 1961 (aged 85) Stony Plain, Alberta
- Party: United Farmers

Willard Moody "Mood" Washburn (September 12, 1875 – August 16, 1961) was a provincial level politician from Alberta, Canada. He served as a member of the Legislative Assembly of Alberta from 1921 to 1930 sitting with the governing United Farmers caucus.

== Political career ==
Washburn ran for a seat to the Alberta Legislature in the 1921 Alberta general election. He stood as the United Farmers candidate in the electoral district of Stony Plain and defeated Conservative incumbent Frederick Lundy and three other candidates winning just over half the popular vote to pick up the seat for his party.

Washburn stood for a second term in office in the 1926 Alberta general election. He would face three other opponents including Lundy for the second time. On election night Washburn despite being at the head of the polls had lost almost 10% of his popular vote from the 1921 election and lacked a clear majority. Under the new Single Transferable Vote rules put in place a second count was needed. He won on the ballot transfers from Independent Liberal candidate M. McKinley to hold the district.

The United Farmers held primaries for the 1930 Alberta general election on May 26, 1930, in the Stony Plain electoral district. The election was hotly contested with three other candidates running for the seat. Washburn would be defeated for the nomination by Donald Macleod. Washburn would retire at dissolution of the legislature in 1930.

He died in 1961 and is interred at the Inga Cemetery.
