= John McPherson (Canadian politician) =

Canadian politician (1855–1944)

John Allen McPherson
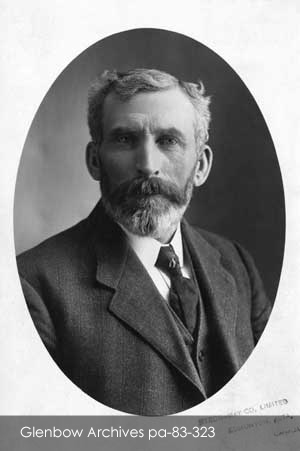

Member of the Legislative Assembly of Alberta
- In office 1905–1913
- Succeeded by: Conrad Weidenhammer
- Constituency: Stony Plain

Personal details
- Born: December 28, 1855 Mount Pleasant, Ontario
- Died: December 26, 1944 (aged 88) Vancouver, British Columbia
- Party: Liberal

John Allen McPherson (December 28, 1855 – December 26, 1944) was a Canadian provincial level politician in Alberta.

== Early life ==
John Allen McPherson was born December 28, 1855, at Mount Pleasant, Ontario to Donald and Catharine McPherson of Scottish descent. McPherson moved west in the spring of 1878, spending three years in Kenora working on the Canadian Pacific Railway He traveled to Edmonton in May 1881 via 105 day ox and cart journey and quickly moved to his selected homestead where he began farming and livestock breeding. He married Christina Hodel on April 22, 1894, had six children together.

McPherson was the director of the Edmonton Exhibition Association from 1901, a town councillor in 1905, school board trustee from 1895, postmaster for Spruce Grove and Justice of the Peace.

== Political career ==
McPherson was first elected as an original member of the Legislative Assembly of Alberta for the electoral district of Stony Plain in the 1905 Alberta general election for the Alberta Liberal Party defeating Dan Bronx of the Conservatives and future Conservative MLA Conrad Weidenhammer who ran as an Independent. He served the Alberta Liberal Party as a back bencher.

McPherson would win a second term to office in Stony Plain in the 1909 Alberta general election in another hotly contested election against three other opponents.

In the 1913 Alberta general election, he would be defeated and retired from politics after being handily defeated by Conservative Conrad Weidenhammer.

Legislative Assembly of Alberta
Preceded by New District	MLA Stony Plain; 1905-1913	Succeeded by Conrad Weidenhammer
