= John McLaughlin (Alberta politician) =

Canadian politician (1905–1991)

John Harold McLaughlin

Member of the Legislative Assembly of Alberta
- In office June 29, 1955 – June 18, 1959
- Preceded by: Cornelia Wood
- Succeeded by: Cornelia Wood
- Constituency: Stony Plain

Personal details
- Born: March 26, 1905 Edmonton, Alberta
- Died: December 8, 1991 (aged 86)
- Party: Liberal

John Harold McLaughlin (March 26, 1905 – December 8, 1991) was a provincial level politician from Alberta, Canada. He served as a member of the Legislative Assembly of Alberta from 1955 to 1959 sitting with the opposition Liberal caucus.

== Political career ==
McLaughlin ran for a seat to the Alberta Legislature in the electoral district of Stony Plain in the 1955 Alberta general election. He won the district defeating incumbent Cornelia Wood on a surge of support that would see the Liberal vote improve by almost 30% from the previous election.

McLaughlin stood for a second term in the 1959 Alberta general election. He would again face Wood who would win her seat back after McLaughlin lost a significant share of his 1955 vote. The two would face each other for the third time in the 1963 Alberta general election. Wood kept her seat as they both lost 4% of their popular vote coming in first and second respectively in the five-way race.
