= William Hayes (Canadian politician) =

Canadian politician (1879-1939)

William Edgar Hayes
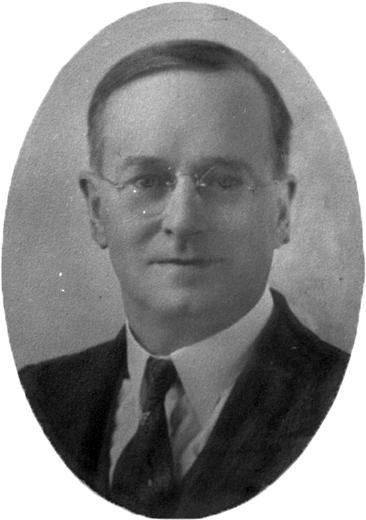

Member of the Legislative Assembly of Alberta
- In office August 22, 1935 – April 2, 1939
- Preceded by: Donald Macleod
- Succeeded by: Cornelia Wood
- Constituency: Stony Plain

Personal details
- Born: April 14, 1879 Prince Albert, Ontario
- Died: April 2, 1939 (aged 59) Stony Plain, Alberta.
- Party: Social Credit

William Edgar Hayes (April 14, 1879 – April 2, 1939) was a provincial level politician from Alberta, Canada. He served as a member of the Legislative Assembly of Alberta sitting with the governing Social Credit caucus from 1935 until his death in 1939.

== Political career ==
Hayes ran for a seat to the Alberta Legislature in the 1935 Alberta general election. He swept to power with almost 60% of the popular vote in the Stony Plain electoral district. He defeated three other candidates in the race including United Farmers incumbent Donald Macleod who finished a distant third.

Hayes died on April 2, 1939, from a reported heart seizure late into his first term in office at his home in Stony Plain, Alberta. He was buried in a cemetery in Edmonton. A large portion of the Social Credit caucus turned out including Premier William Aberhart.
