= Conrad Weidenhammer =

Canadian politician (1866–1919)

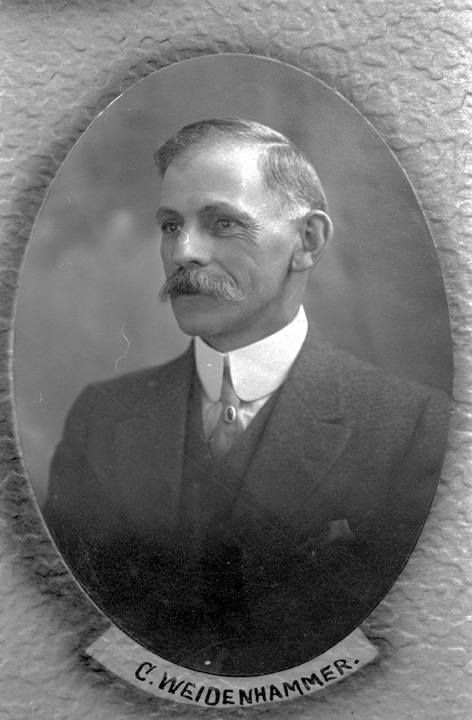

Member of the Legislative Assembly of Alberta
- In office March 25, 1913 – June 7, 1917
- Preceded by: John McPherson
- Succeeded by: Frederick Lundy
- Constituency: Stony Plain

Personal details
- Born: January 27, 1866 Elmira, Canada West
- Died: January 19, 1919 (aged 52) Spruce Grove, Alberta, Canada
- Party: Conservative
- Occupation: farmer

Conrad Weidenhammer (January 27, 1866 – January 19, 1919) was a farmer and provincial level politician from Alberta, Canada. He served as a member of the Legislative Assembly of Alberta from 1913 to 1917 sitting with the Conservative caucus.

== Early life ==
Weidenhammer's wife gave birth to a daughter at Elmira, Canada West, on March 24, 1896.

== Political career ==
Weidenhammer ran for a seat to the Alberta Legislature in the 1905 Alberta general election. He ran as the Conservative candidate in the electoral district of Stony Plain but finished a distant third place, losing to Liberal candidate John McPherson.

McPherson and Weidenhammer rsn against each other once again in the 1913 Alberta general election. This time Weidenhammer defeated McPherson in a straight contest winning over 60% of the popular vote. It is said he had the broad support of the local German community during the election. Weidenhammer served out his term in office before retiring from Alberta provincial politics in 1917. He died in 1919.
