= Stan Woloshyn =

Canadian politician

MLA for Stony Plain
- In office March 20, 1989 – November 22, 2004
- Preceded by: Jim Heron
- Succeeded by: Fred Lindsay

Personal details
- Born: July 17, 1939 (age 87) Edmonton, Alberta
- Party: NDP (1989–1993); Progressive Conservative

Stanley Woloshyn (born July 17, 1939) is a politician in Alberta, Canada. He was first elected to the Legislative Assembly of Alberta as an Alberta New Democrats candidate in 1989. Woloshyn was reportedly a former card-carrying Progressive Conservative member. Before the next election, he crossed the floor to join the Progressive-|Conservative caucus for which he sat for 11 years.

Born in Edmonton, Woloshyn received a bachelor of education degree from the University of Alberta, and went on to serve as teacher, department head and principal of Memorial Composite High School in Stony Plain. From 1977 to 1989, he served as principal of Kitaskinaw School on the Enoch Indian Reserve.

Woloshyn crossed the floor to the governing Progressive Conservative caucus prior to the election in 1993. In 1996, Woloshyn was appointed Minister of Public Works, Supply and Services, and was re-elected (and re-appointed to cabinet) in 1997. Following the cabinet shuffle of May 1999, he was named Minister of Community Development.

In the year 2000, Woloshyn received the Association of Professional Engineers and Geologists of Alberta (APEGGA) Summit Award.

Woloshyn ran again in 2001, re-capturing the constituency of Stony Plain easily, with 67% of the vote. He did not run again in 2004. Rates at the province's long-term care facilities were increased by 42% under his watch, and Woloshyn himself was "somewhat disappointed" in the lack of assistance handed down to seniors in the spring 2004. The NDP was critical of his and other returning government members' "transition allowances", in Woloshyn's case totalling over $477,000.

Legislative Assembly of Alberta
Preceded by Jim Heron	MLA Stony Plain; 1989-2004	Succeeded by Fred Lindsay
