= Erin Babcock =

Canadian nurse and politician (1981–2020)

Member of the Legislative Assembly of Alberta for Stony Plain
- In office 5 May 2015 – 19 March 2019
- Preceded by: Ken Lemke
- Succeeded by: Searle Turton

Personal details
- Born: 6 June 1981
- Died: 25 April 2020 (aged 38) Edmonton, Alberta, Canada
- Party: Alberta New Democratic
- Occupation: Nurse, politician

Erin Babcock (6 June 1981 – 25 April 2020) was a Canadian nurse and politician who was elected in the 2015 Alberta general election to the Legislative Assembly of Alberta, representing the electoral district of Stony Plain.

== Early life ==
Babcock was the daughter of a pipeliner in the Alberta oil industry, and her family lived in many areas across Western Canada during her childhood. She mentioned that her family's involvement in the oil industry had affected their family life and their economic status.

== Career ==
Babcock worked as a licensed practical nurse since 2006 before entering politics in 2015. She had worked in Kindersley, Saskatchewan as a nurse before moving to Edmonton. Babcock worked closely with elderly and stroke patients as well as patients with serious mental and physical health issues. While in Kindersley, Babcock was involved in the Special Olympics where she served on the board of directors.

== Legislative Assembly of Alberta ==
In the 2015 Alberta general election, Babcock defeated incumbent Progressive Conservative MLA Ken Lemke to represent Stony Plain. In the 2019 Alberta general election, Stony Plain was dissolved and became Spruce Grove-Stony Plain, and she was defeated by the nominee of the new United Conservative Party, Searle Turton.

== Illness and death ==
Babcock was diagnosed with uterine cancer in May 2018. She said that she would continue as the MLA for Stony Plain while undergoing cancer treatment. The treatment would take a couple of weeks and did not stop her from pursuing the issues that got her involved in politics. As part of her campaign, Babcock had promised to fight for fair access to health care across Alberta and this continued to be an issue during her treatment. Babcock died from the cancer in Edmonton on 25 April 2020, at age 38.

== Electoral history ==
=== 2019 general election ===
2019 Alberta general election: Spruce Grove-Stony Plain
Party	Candidate	Votes	%	±%
United Conservative	Searle Turton	15,843	59.35%	11.15%
New Democratic	Erin Babcock	7,836	29.36%	12.38%
Alberta Party	Ivan G. Boles	2,597	9.73%	4.58%
Alberta Independence	Jody Crocker	417	1.56%	–
Total		26,693	–	–
Rejected, spoiled and declined		47	77	16
Eligible electors / turnout		37,296	71.74%	–
United Conservative pickup new district.				
Source(s) Source: "82 - Spruce Grove-Stony Plain, 2019 Alberta general election". officialresults.elections.ab.ca. Elections Alberta. Alberta. Chief Electoral Officer (2019). 2019 General Election. A Report of the Chief Electoral Officer. Volume II (PDF) (Report). Vol. 2. Edmonton, Alta.: Elections Alberta. pp. 399–403. ISBN 978-1-988620-12-1.

=== 2015 general election ===
2015 Alberta general election: Stony Plain
Party	Candidate	Votes	%	±%
New Democratic	Erin Babcock	7,268	37.83%	29.83%
Wildrose	Kathy Rondeau	5,586	29.07%	-8.69%
Progressive Conservative	Ken Lemke	4,944	25.73%	-19.49%
Liberal	Mike Hanlon	657	3.42%	-3.39%
Alberta Party	Sandy Simmie	538	2.80%	1.49%
Green	Matthew Burnett	220	1.15%	0.25%
Total		19,213	–	–
Rejected, spoiled and declined		66	–	–
Eligible electors / turnout		32,852	58.68%	3.80%
New Democratic gain from Progressive Conservative		Swing		0.65%
Source(s) Source: "81 - Stony Plain Official Results 2015 Alberta general election". Elections Alberta.

== See also ==
- Nursing in Canada
- Women in Canadian politics
- Women in nursing
