= Lake Isle, Alberta =

Coordinates: 53°38′56″N 114°42′45″W

Location of Lake Isle Alberta

Lake Isle is an unincorporated community in central Alberta, Canada within Lac Ste. Anne County. It is located on the shore of Isle Lake, 7 kilometres (4.3 mi) north of Highway 16, and approximately 82 kilometres (51 mi) west of Edmonton.

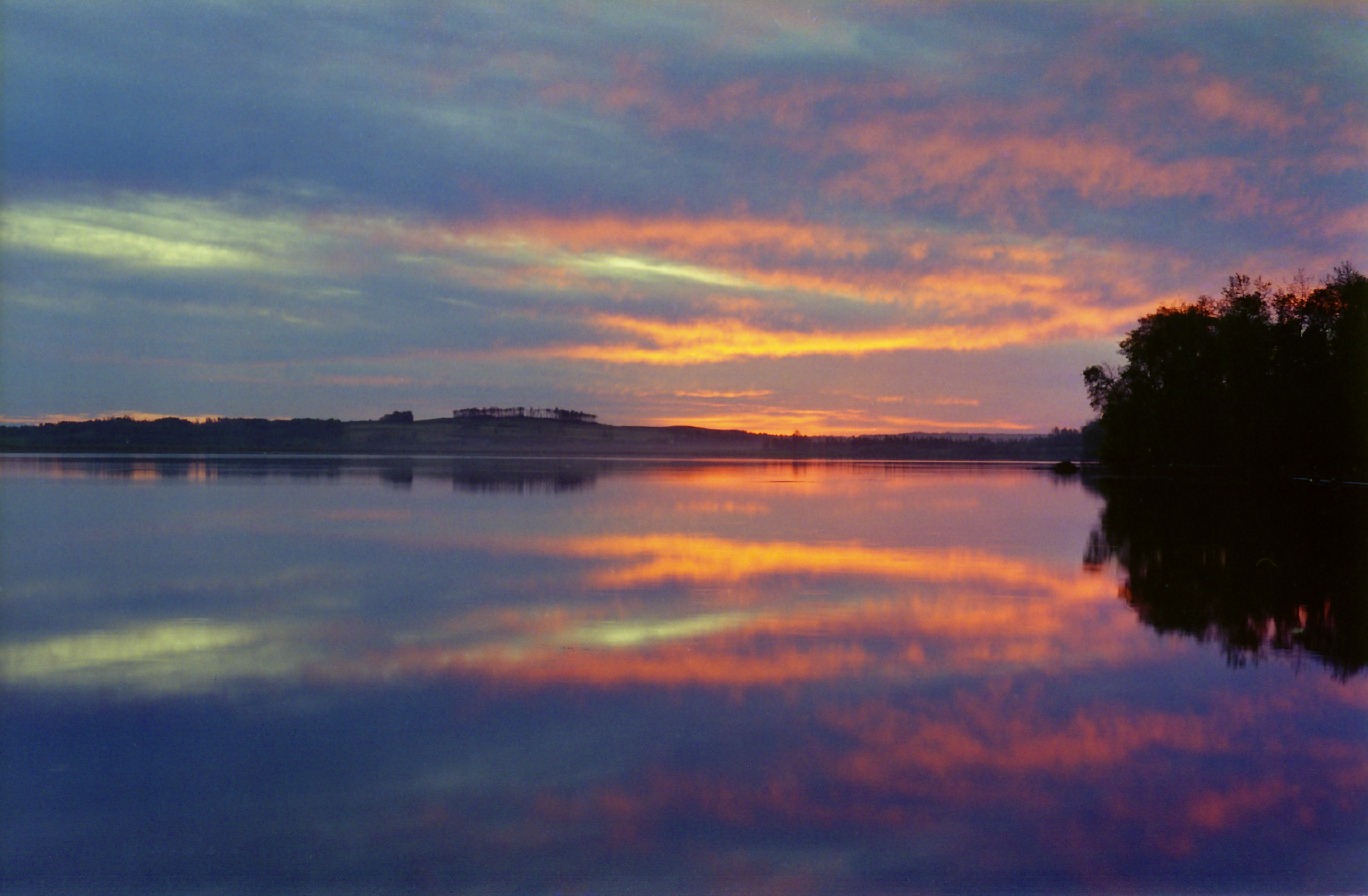
Sunset at Lake Isle

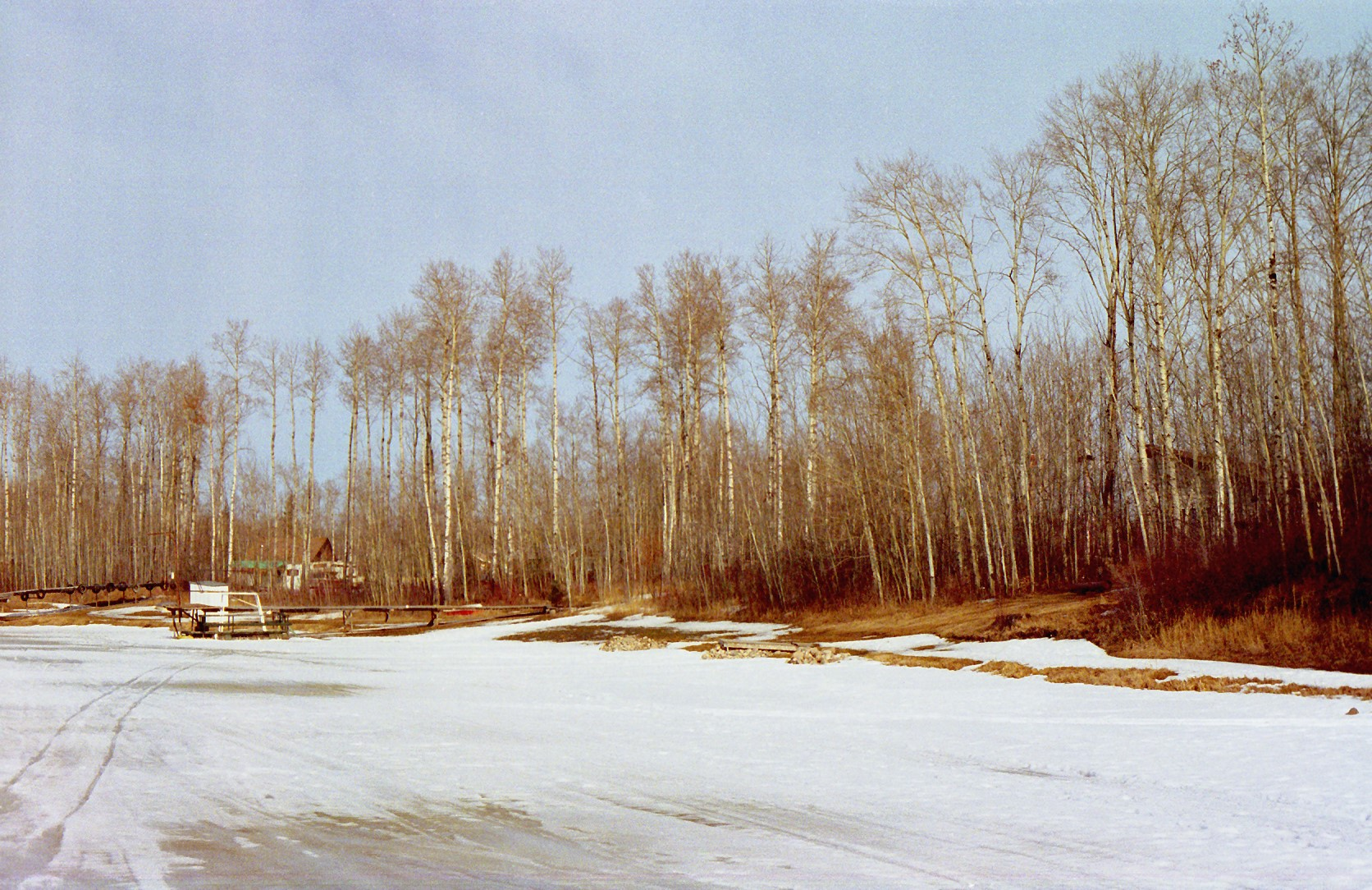
Frozen Lake Isle in winter

== History ==
Lake Isle was developed on the Yellowhead Trail fur trade route between Lac Ste. Anne and Jasper. The first school opened at Lake Isle in 1913 and burned in 1920. A new school was built and used until school consolidation in 1947. The first store was opened in 1915 by freighter and storekeeper, Ted Bigland. The Canadian Northern Railway was built along the Yellowhead route. Lake Isle is primarily a farming and ranching community, with cottages along the lake shore.

== Notable people ==
Donald Macleod (October 28, 1878 – April 15, 1957) (Alberta politician) - elected 1930 as a member of the Legislative Assembly and served until 1935. Farmed in the Lake Isle area.
