= Jim Heron =

Canadian politician (1940–2023)

James "Jim" P. Heron

MLA for Stony Plain
- In office 1986–1989
- Preceded by: William Purdy
- Succeeded by: Stan Woloshyn

Personal details
- Born: March 21, 1940 Edmonton, Alberta
- Died: November 27, 2023 (aged 83) Stony Plain, Alberta
- Party: Progressive Conservative

James Patrick Heron (March 21, 1940 - November 27, 2023) was a provincial level politician from Alberta, Canada. He served as a member of the Legislative Assembly of Alberta from 1986 to 1989.

== Political career ==
Heron ran for a seat to the Alberta Legislature in the 1986 Alberta general election. He won the electoral district of Stony Plain to hold it for the governing Progressive Conservative party. Heron ran for a second term in the 1989 Alberta general election he was defeated by New Democrat candidate Stan Woloshyn in a hotly contested race.
