= Spruce Grove-Stony Plain =

Provincial electoral district in Alberta, Canada

Alberta electoral district
- Spruce Grove-Stony Plain within the Edmonton Metropolitan Region (2017 boundaries).

Provincial electoral district
- Legislature: Legislative Assembly of Alberta
MLA
Searle Turton
United Conservative
- District created: 2017
- First contested: 2019
- Last contested: 2023

Demographics
- Population (2016): 51,267
- Area (km²): 68.5
- Pop. density (per km²): 748.4
- Census division(s): 11
- Census subdivision(s): Spruce Grove, Stony Plain

Spruce Grove-Stony Plain is a provincial electoral district in Alberta, Canada. The district is one of 87 districts mandated to return a single member (MLA) to the Legislative Assembly of Alberta using the first past the post method of voting. It was contested for the first time in the 2019 Alberta election.

== Geography ==
The district is located west of Edmonton, containing the City of Spruce Grove and the Town of Stony Plain. The district boundaries match the municipal boundaries of the two communities. It is bisected by Highway 16A and bordered by the Yellowhead Highway to the North.

== History ==
Members for Spruce Grove-Stony Plain
Assembly	Years	Member	Party
See Spruce Grove-St. Albert 2012-2019 and Stony Plain 1905-2019
30th	2019–2023	Searle Turton	United Conservative
31st	2023–	Searle Turton	United Conservative

The district was created in 2017 when the Electoral Boundaries Commission recommended abolishing Spruce Grove-St. Albert and Stony Plain, creating a district that is well above the provincial average in population. The Commission reasoned this was preferable to placing part of either community in a neighbouring district.

== Electoral results ==
=== 2023 ===
2023 Alberta general election
Party	Candidate	Votes	%	±%
United Conservative	Searle Turton	14,365	56.99	-2.36
New Democratic	Chantal Saramaga-McKenzie	10,197	40.45	+11.10
Green	Daniel Birrell	422	1.67	–
Solidarity Movement	Darlene Clarke	223	0.88	–
Total		25,207	99.57	–
Rejected and declined		108	0.43	
Turnout		25,315	61.52	
Eligible voters		41,150		
United Conservative hold		Swing		-6.73
Source(s) Source: Elections Alberta

=== 2019 ===
2019 Alberta general election
Party	Candidate	Votes	%	±%
United Conservative	Searle Turton	15,843	59.35%	11.15%
New Democratic	Erin Babcock	7,836	29.36%	12.38%
Alberta Party	Ivan G. Boles	2,597	9.73%	4.58%
Alberta Independence	Jody Crocker	417	1.56%	–
Total		26,693	–	–
Rejected, spoiled and declined		47	77	16
Eligible electors / turnout		37,296	71.74%	–
United Conservative pickup new district.				
Source(s) Source: "82 - Spruce Grove-Stony Plain, 2019 Alberta general election". officialresults.elections.ab.ca. Elections Alberta. Alberta. Chief Electoral Officer (2019). 2019 General Election. A Report of the Chief Electoral Officer. Volume II (PDF) (Report). Vol. 2. Edmonton, Alta.: Elections Alberta. pp. 399–403. ISBN 978-1-988620-12-1.

=== 2015 ===
Redistributed results, 2015 Alberta election
Party	Votes	%
New Democratic	7,738	41.74
Progressive Conservative	4,699	25.35
Wildrose	4,236	22.85
Alberta Party	955	5.15
Liberal	683	3.68
Green	228	1.23

== See also ==
- List of Alberta provincial electoral districts
- Canadian provincial electoral districts
