= William Purdy =

Canadian politician (born 1940)

William Frederick Purdy

Member of the Legislative Assembly of Alberta
- In office 1971–1986
- Preceded by: Ralph Jespersen
- Succeeded by: Jim Heron
- Constituency: Stony Plain

Personal details
- Born: June 5, 1940 (age 86) Edmonton, Alberta
- Party: Progressive Conservative

William Frederick Purdy (born June 5, 1940) was a provincial level politician from Alberta, Canada. He served as a member of the Legislative Assembly of Alberta from 1971 to 1986. During his time in office he sat with the governing Progressive Conservative party. Purdy also served as the mayor for the village of Wabamun for many years.

== Political career ==
=== Provincial politics ===
Purdy ran for a seat to the Alberta Legislature in the 1971 Alberta general election. He won the electoral district of Stony Plain to pick up the district for the Progressive Conservatives. The win helped them form government in that election. By winning the constituency he defeated incumbent Ralph Jespersen by a close margin.

He ran for a second term in the 1975 general election. The field was crowded with four opposing candidates but Purdy easily retained his seat. He ran for a third term in the 1979 general election winning his district with a larger landslide then 1975. He ran for a fourth term in office in the 1982 general election. In that election he faced six other candidates but still won the biggest landslide of his career topping 10,000 votes. Purdy retired from provincial office at dissolution of the legislature in 1986.

=== Municipal politics ===
Purdy became the mayor of the Village of Wabuman, he served in that office from at least since 2000 to 2008. He is also the current executive director for the Alberta Fire Chief's Association.
