= Ralph Jespersen =

Canadian politician (1925-2016)

Ralph Andrew Jespersen

Member of the Legislative Assembly of Alberta
- In office May 23, 1967 – August 30, 1971
- Preceded by: Cornelia Wood
- Succeeded by: William Purdy
- Constituency: Stony Plain

Personal details
- Born: May 9, 1925 Stony Plain, Alberta
- Died: October 17, 2016 (aged 91) Alberta, Canada
- Party: Social Credit
- Spouse: Bernice Jespersen
- Occupation: Dairyman

Ralph Andrew Jespersen (May 9, 1925 – October 17, 2016) was a dairyman and provincial politician from Alberta, Canada. He served as a member of the Legislative Assembly of Alberta from 1967 to 1971, sitting with the governing Social Credit caucus.

== Political career ==
Jespersen ran for a seat to the Alberta Legislature in the 1967 Alberta general election. He was nominated as the Social Credit candidate in the Stony Plain electoral district on February 13, 1967. In the nomination race he defeated longtime incumbent Cornelia Wood.

He would face Wood again in the general election as well as two other candidates. Jespersen would take just 36% of the popular vote to win the tight four way race along with defeating Wood for the second time who finished a distant fourth place running as an Independent Social Credit candidate.

Jespersen ran for a second term in the 1971 Alberta general election but finished second being defeated by Progressive Conservative candidate William Purdy despite gaining a modest increase in vote percentage. Jespersen died on October 17, 2016, at the age of 91.
