= Cornelia Wood =

Canadian politician (1892-1985)

Cornelia Lucinda Railey Wood

Member of the Legislative Assembly of Alberta
- In office March 21, 1940 – June 29, 1955
- Preceded by: William Hayes
- Succeeded by: John McLaughlin
- Constituency: Stony Plain
- In office June 18, 1959 – May 23, 1967
- Preceded by: John McLaughlin
- Succeeded by: Ralph Jespersen
- Constituency: Stony Plain

Personal details
- Born: April 14, 1892
- Died: December 26, 1985 (aged 93)
- Party: Social Credit; Independent Social Credit

Cornelia Lucinda Railey Wood (April 14, 1892 – December 26, 1985) was a provincial level politician from Alberta, Canada. She served as a member of the Legislative Assembly of Alberta twice the first time being from 1940 to 1955 and the second time being from 1959 to 1967. She sat with the governing Social Credit party and later as an Independent.

She was married to Russell Wood. She was originally a teacher, then a leader at the local Women's Institute, chair of the local school board and mayor of Stony Plain.

== Political career ==
Wood ran for a seat in the Alberta Legislature for the first time in the 1940 Alberta general election. She defeated three other candidates in a hotly contested race on the third count to hold the Stony Plain electoral district for the Social Credit party. She ran for a second term in office in the 1944 Alberta general election and won a landslide against Co-operative Commonwealth candidate Harold Anderson in a straight fight.

Wood ran for a third term in the 1948 Alberta general election. She faced Anderson for the second election and a liberal candidate. She won re-election cleanly with just over 50% of the popular vote.

Wood stood for a fourth term in office in the 1952 Alberta general election. Her popular vote fell just enough to force a second count. She won re-election after the ballot transfers from Liberal candidate Charles Wudel gave her a large majority.

Wood was defeated standing for a fifth term in office in the 1955 Alberta general election. Liberal candidate John McLaughlin doubled his party percentage surging to a first ballot win with Wood finishing a close second.

McLaughlin and Wood faced each other for the second time in the 1959 Alberta general election. This time McLaughlin ended losing almost 20% of his popular vote from the previous election and being defeated. Wood was re-elected to her fifth term and second stint in office with just under half the popular vote.

A rematch between Wood and McLaughlin took place for the third time in the 1963 general election. Both candidates lost about 4% of their vote in the five-way race with Wood hanging onto her seat and McLaughlin finishing second. Future MLA Rudolph Zander also ran in this race finishing a distant fourth place.

Wood stood for a seventh term in office, however the Social Credit Stony Plain constituency association was looking for a change. On February 11, 1967, Wood was defeated by Ralph Jespersen in a nomination battle. Wood left the Social Credit caucus on April 24, 1967, stating that she was the only true Social Crediter left and that was perhaps the reason for getting rid of her. She ran against Jespersen in the general election and two other candidates and was defeated, finishing a very distant fourth place.

In 1981, in recognition of her achievements, she was named a recipient of the Governor General's Awards in Commemoration of the Persons Case.
