= Donald Macleod (politician) =

Canadian politician (1878–1957)

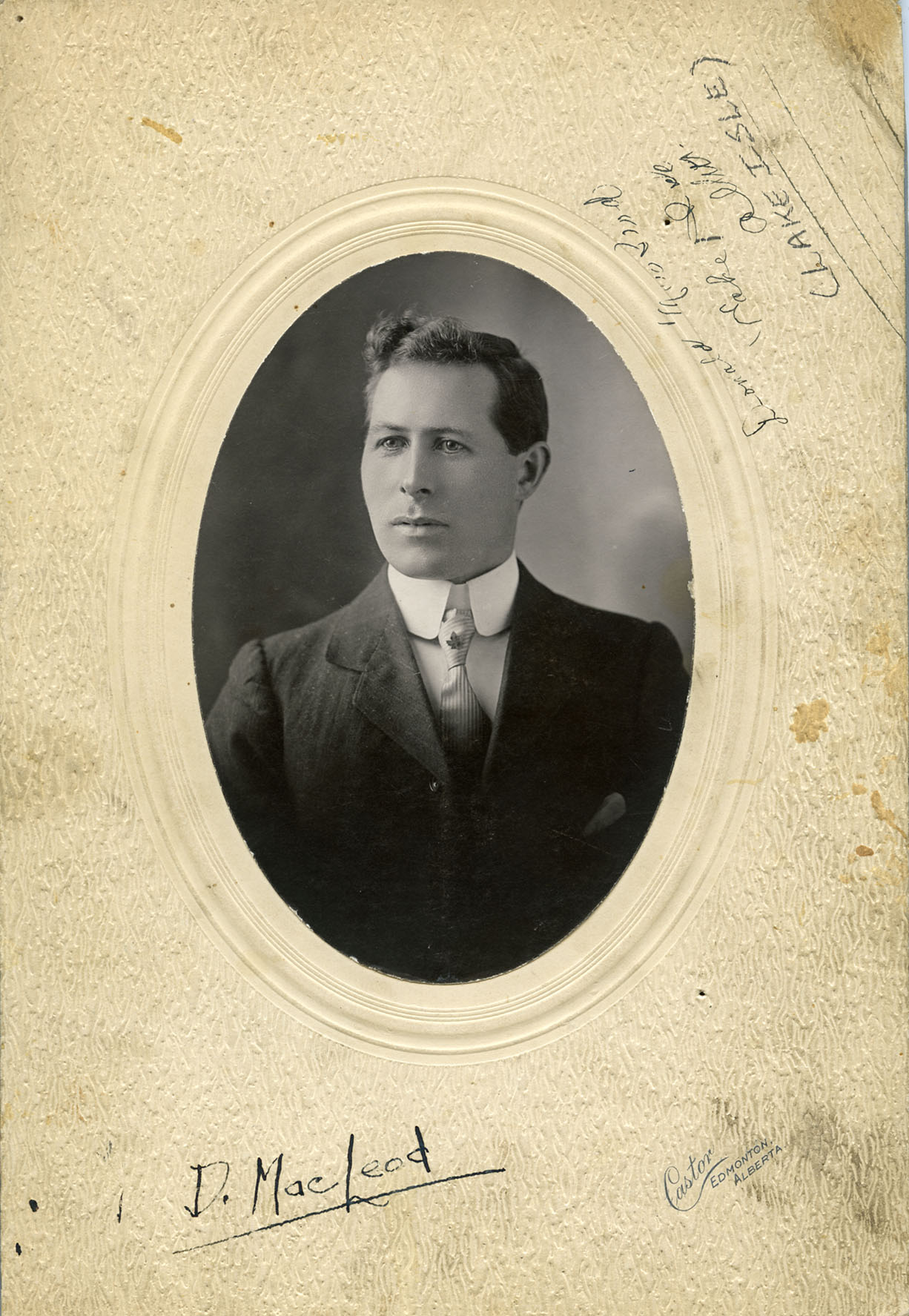

Member of the Legislative Assembly of Alberta
- In office June 19, 1930 – August 22, 1935
- Preceded by: Willard Washburn
- Succeeded by: William Hayes
- Constituency: Stony Plain

Personal details
- Born: October 28, 1878
- Died: April 15, 1957 (aged 78)
- Party: United Farmers

Donald Macleod (October 28, 1878 – April 15, 1957) was a provincial level politician from Alberta, Canada. He served as a member of the Legislative Assembly of Alberta from 1930 until 1935, sitting with the governing United Farmers caucus.

== Political career ==
Macleod ran for a seat to the Alberta Legislature in the 1930 Alberta general election. He defeated sitting United Farmers member Willard Washburn and three other candidates in his party primaries held on May 26, 1930.

In the election he ran in a straight fight against Liberal candidate George Bryan, winning 53% of the popular vote to hold the electoral district of Stony Plain for his party.

Macleod ran for a second term in the 1935 Alberta general election. He was unseated by Social Credit candidate William Hayes, who captured the district in a landslide. Macleod finished a distant third place in the slate of four candidates.

== Later life ==
Macleod farmed in the Lake Isle area and served as the President of the Alberta Provincial Sheep Breeders Association. He also served on local school boards and as a municipal councillor.
