= Fred Lindsay =

Canadian politician

The Honourable Fred Lindsay ECA

MLA for Stony Plain
- In office 2004–2012
- Preceded by: Stan Woloshyn

Personal details
- Born: March 12, 1946 (age 80)
- Party: Progressive Conservative

Frederick Lindsay ECA (born March 12, 1946) is a politician and was a provincial Member of the Legislative Assembly (MLA) in Alberta, Canada.

== Political involvement ==
Lindsay has been a longtime Progressive Conservative, having served on the Stony Plain board of directors for the last 25 years. He sought election after longtime member Stan Woloshyn retired from the Legislative Assembly of Alberta in 2004.

Lindsay was elected to his first term as the Progressive Conservative member for Stony Plain provincial electoral district in the 2004 Alberta general election. He was re-elected to a second term in the 2008 election.

On December 14, 2006, Lindsay was appointed to the cabinet as Solicitor General and Minister of Public Security, when Ed Stelmach became Premier. He served in the job until January 13, 2010.

== Electoral record ==
=== 2004 Alberta general election ===
2004 Alberta general election: Stony Plain
Party	Candidate	Votes	%	±%
Progressive Conservative	Fred Lindsay	5,581	44.51%	-22.69%
Liberal	Bill Fraser	3,381	26.97%	3.38%
Alberta Alliance	Marilyn Burns	1,904	15.19%	–
New Democratic	Ruth Yanor	1,362	10.86%	1.65%
Social Credit	Henry Neumann	310	2.47%	–
Total		12,538	–	–
Rejected, spoiled and declined		44	–	–
Eligible electors / turnout		26,086	48.23%	-9.71%
Progressive Conservative hold		Swing		-13.03%
Source(s) Source: "Stony Plain Official Results 2004 Alberta general election". Alberta Heritage Community Foundation.

Alberta provincial government of Ed Stelmach
Cabinet posts (2)
Predecessor	Office	Successor
Harvey Cenaiko	Minister of Public Security; 2006–2010	Frank Oberle
Harvey Cenaiko	Solicitor General; 2006–2010	Frank Oberle
Legislative Assembly of Alberta
Preceded by Stan Woloshyn	MLA Stony Plain; 2004-2012	Succeeded by TBD
