= Searle Turton =

Canadian politician

The Honourable Searle Turton ECA MLA
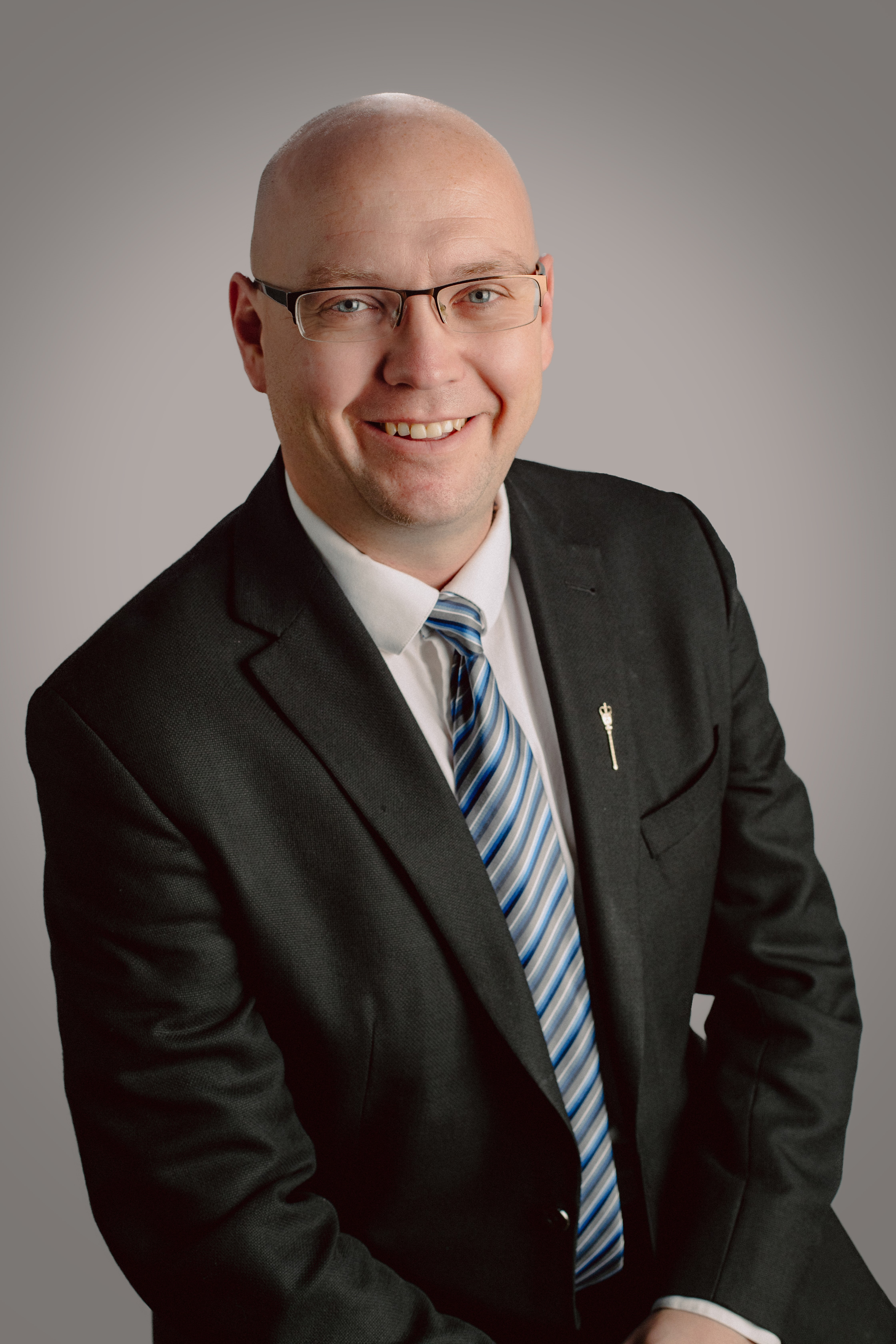

Minister of Children and Family Services
- Incumbent
- Assumed office June 9, 2023
- Premier: Danielle Smith
- Preceded by: Mickey Amery

Member of the Legislative Assembly of Alberta for Spruce Grove-Stony Plain
- Incumbent
- Assumed office April 16, 2019
- Preceded by: Erin Babcock

Personal details
- Born: June 23, 1979 (age 47) Regina, Saskatchewan, Canada
- Party: United Conservative Party
- Spouse: Amy Turton (m. 2001)
- Occupation: Technology Sales, Industrial Construction

Searle Turton ECA MLA (born June 23, 1979) is a Canadian politician who serves as the Alberta Minister of Children and Family Services. He represents the electoral district of Spruce Grove-Stony Plain in the Legislative Assembly of Alberta, having been first elected in the 2019 Alberta general election and re-elected in 2023.

== Early life and education ==
Turton was born on June 23, 1979, in Regina, Saskatchewan. He graduated from high school in Spruce Grove and has been a resident of the Spruce Grove-Stony Plain constituency for over two decades.

== Pre-political career ==
Before entering politics, Turton worked in both the technology and construction sectors. He worked in technology sales for Ricoh Canada, where he specialized in implementing document control systems. Prior to this, he worked as a dual-ticket tradesman in construction and later in construction consulting with various oil refineries and facilities throughout Alberta.

Turton has been a lifelong volunteer and participated in multiple international mission trips, working with children's programs and home building projects for underprivileged families.

== Municipal politics (2010-2019) ==
Turton served three terms as a city councillor for the City of Spruce Grove from 2010 to 2019, resigning mid-way through his final term to campaign for provincial office. During his municipal tenure, the city nearly doubled in population and undertook several major infrastructure projects.

Among the key projects Turton cited as highlights of his time on council were helping bring the Border Paving Athletic Centre to life and the development of a splash park. In his farewell address to council in 2019, Turton stated: "Thousands of kids for generations will use that, and obviously as mayor Houston alluded to, a splash park, and providing free spontaneous recreational choices for young families. That was important to me coming in on my very first brochure." The REMAX Spray Park at Jubilee Park features over 80 water nozzles and splash toys and has become a popular family destination in the city.

Council also undertook its largest capital project during Turton's tenure with the construction of a new protective services facility.

During his time on council, he held several volunteer leadership positions:

- Chairman of the TransAlta Tri Leisure Centre
- Director of the Spruce Grove Public Library Board
- Trustee for the Alberta Regional Council of Carpenters and Allied Workers, Local 1325

=== 2010 Spruce Grove municipal election ===
Eligible voters: 18,324 Votes cast: 4,016 Turnout: 22%
Mayor (acclaimed)
Candidate	Votes
HOUSTON, Stuart (acclaimed)	N/A
Alderman (6 positions)
Candidate	Votes
TURTON, Searle (elected)	2,293
ACEVEDO, John	1,849
ACKER, Jeff (elected)	2,870
BAXTER, Louise (elected)	2,000
GILLIE, Ann	1,343
JENSEN, Glenn	1,541
KESANKO, Bill (elected)	2,040
MCCONNELL, Jeremy	1,564
ROTHE, Wayne (elected)	2,122
STEINBURG, Bill (elected)	1,893

=== 2013 Spruce Grove municipal election ===
Eligible voters: 22,000 Votes cast: 5,039 Turnout: 22.9%
Mayor (1 position)
Candidate	Votes
HOUSTON, Stuart (elected)	3,244
SAUNDERS, Dan	1,764
Alderman (6 positions)
Candidate	Votes
TURTON, Searle (elected)	3,465
BAXTER, Louise (elected)	2,777
GILLIE, Ann	2,404
KESANKO, Bill (elected)	2,985
MCLEAN, Ed (elected)	2,735
MILLER, Bernadine	1,230
ROTHE, Wayne (elected)	2,932
STEINBURG, Bill (elected)	2,768
THIEBAUD, Michelle	2,445

=== 2017 Spruce Grove municipal election ===
Eligible voters: 25,187 Votes cast: 7,125 Turnout: 28.29%
Mayor (1 position)
Candidate	Votes
HOUSTON, Stuart (elected)	5,381
DOORNEKAMP, Daniel	1,631
Alderman (6 positions)
Candidate	Votes
TURTON, Searle (elected)	4,250
CHARD, Stephanie	2,475
GARRATT, Owen	1,910
GILLETT, Jan	2,418
MACDONALD, Reid	2,478
MCKENZIE, Chantal (elected)	2,563
MCLEAN, Ed	2,344
OLDHAM, Dave (elected)	4,712
ROTHE, Wayne (elected)	2,827
STEINBURG, Bill	2,294
STEVENSON, Erin (elected)	2,837
THIEBAUD-GRUHLKE, Michelle (elected)	2,757

== Provincial political career ==
=== Election as MLA ===
Turton was first elected as Member of the Legislative Assembly for Spruce Grove-Stony Plain on April 16, 2019, as a member of the United Conservative Party. He defeated United Conservative Party nomination challengers Mathew Clarke and Jerry W. Semen in December 2018. He was re-elected on May 29, 2023.

==== Committee work and parliamentary roles ====
Before his appointment to Cabinet, Turton held several legislative positions:

- Parliamentary Secretary to the Minister of Energy
- Chair of the Social Services Cabinet Policy Committee
- Deputy Chair of the Standing Committee on Public Accounts
- Member of the Standing Committee on Resource Stewardship

==== Private members' motions ====
Before his appointment to Cabinet, Turton introduced influential private members' motions:

Motion 501 (2019) - Adoption Streamlining: This was the first private member's motion of the 2019 session. It urged the government to examine ways to streamline adoption processes and reduce red tape for families. The motion received unanimous support and was agreed to on May 27, 2019.

Motion 510 (2020) - Extended Producer Responsibility (EPR): This motion urged the provincial government to implement EPR measures to balance economic and environmental needs, specifically shifting the cost of recycling programs from municipalities to manufacturers. The motion was agreed to as amended on October 26, 2020.

==== Minister of Children and Family Services ====
Turton was sworn in as Minister of Children and Family Services on June 9, 2023, following Premier Danielle Smith's cabinet shuffle after the 2023 election.

==== E. coli Outbreak response (2023) ====
In September 2023, Turton managed the government's response to Alberta's largest E. coli outbreak, which affected hundreds of children at multiple Calgary daycares. The outbreak was linked to a shared commercial kitchen. Turton announced a compensation program providing $2,000 per child affected by closures and led a review of shared commercial kitchens serving daycares across the province.

==== Foster care and kinship support initiatives (2023-2025) ====
As Minister, Turton implemented several initiatives to support foster and kinship caregivers in Alberta. In October 2023, the government announced over $23.6 million in new supports for caregivers and measures to improve stability for young people in care. Key initiatives included the Enhanced Caregiver Compensation, mental health supports, the Transition to Adulthood Program, and the Refer-a-Foster Caregiver Program.

The initiatives received positive responses from stakeholder organizations. Melissa Jones, CEO of the Alberta Foster and Kinship Association, stated that foster caregivers' "well-being is important, and we are very pleased to see that new funding is on the way." Bjorn Johansson, CEO of Wood's Homes, commented that his organization was "pleased Alberta's government is helping to build good mental health for not just those in care but for those who care for them." Sonja Polz, executive director of ALIGN Association of Community Services, described the investment as "an important step in ensuring caregivers have the resources they need to provide care, stability, and safety for children and youth in their homes."

As of December 31, 2024, Alberta had 1,494 foster caregivers, 2,196 kinship caregivers, and 3,013 families offering permanent homes through adoption or guardianship.

==== Seniors housing investment (2023) ====
In March 2023, Turton announced a $14.7 million investment to the Meridian Housing Foundation to build seniors' housing units in Spruce Grove, the largest single allocation in a provincial affordable housing program announcement. Turton stated at the announcement that he had advocated to Alberta's housing minister "over and over and over again about the need for more seniors’ housing" in his constituency.

==== Private members' bills ====
In March 2021, Turton introduced Bill 213: the Traffic Safety (Maximum Speed Limit for Provincial Freeways) Amendment Act, which proposed raising the speed limit on divided highways outside urban areas from 110 km/h to 120 km/h. The bill applied to highways including Highways 1, 2, 3, 4, 16, and 43. Turton argued that Alberta's flat prairie terrain made the roads suitable for higher speeds and that the change would improve safety by better synchronizing posted limits with actual driving speeds. The bill passed first reading on March 10, 2021, but did not advance beyond that stage.

=== Controversies ===
==== Sean Feucht legislature tour (2025) ====
In August 2025, Turton faced criticism for conducting a late-night tour of the Alberta Legislature for American Christian singer Sean Feucht following a concert on the legislature grounds. Feucht, known for his socially conservative views on abortion and LGBTQ rights, posted a video on social media showing a "worship session" in the legislature rotunda.

Opposition NDP deputy leader Rakhi Pancholi criticized the incident, stating that "turning a space that belongs to all Albertans into a Minister's personal worshipping space is wrong." Turton acknowledged the tour was "not usual procedure" and promised to follow proper protocols in the future, though he stated no rules had been broken.

==== Recall petition (2025) ====
On November 26, 2025, Elections Alberta approved a recall petition against Turton. Under Alberta's Recall Act, petitioners have 90 days to collect signatures from voters equal to at least 60% of those who voted in the most recent provincial election.

The petition was withdrawn by the applicant on February 18, 2026, before the February 23, 2026 deadline for signature collection.

== Legislative career timeline ==
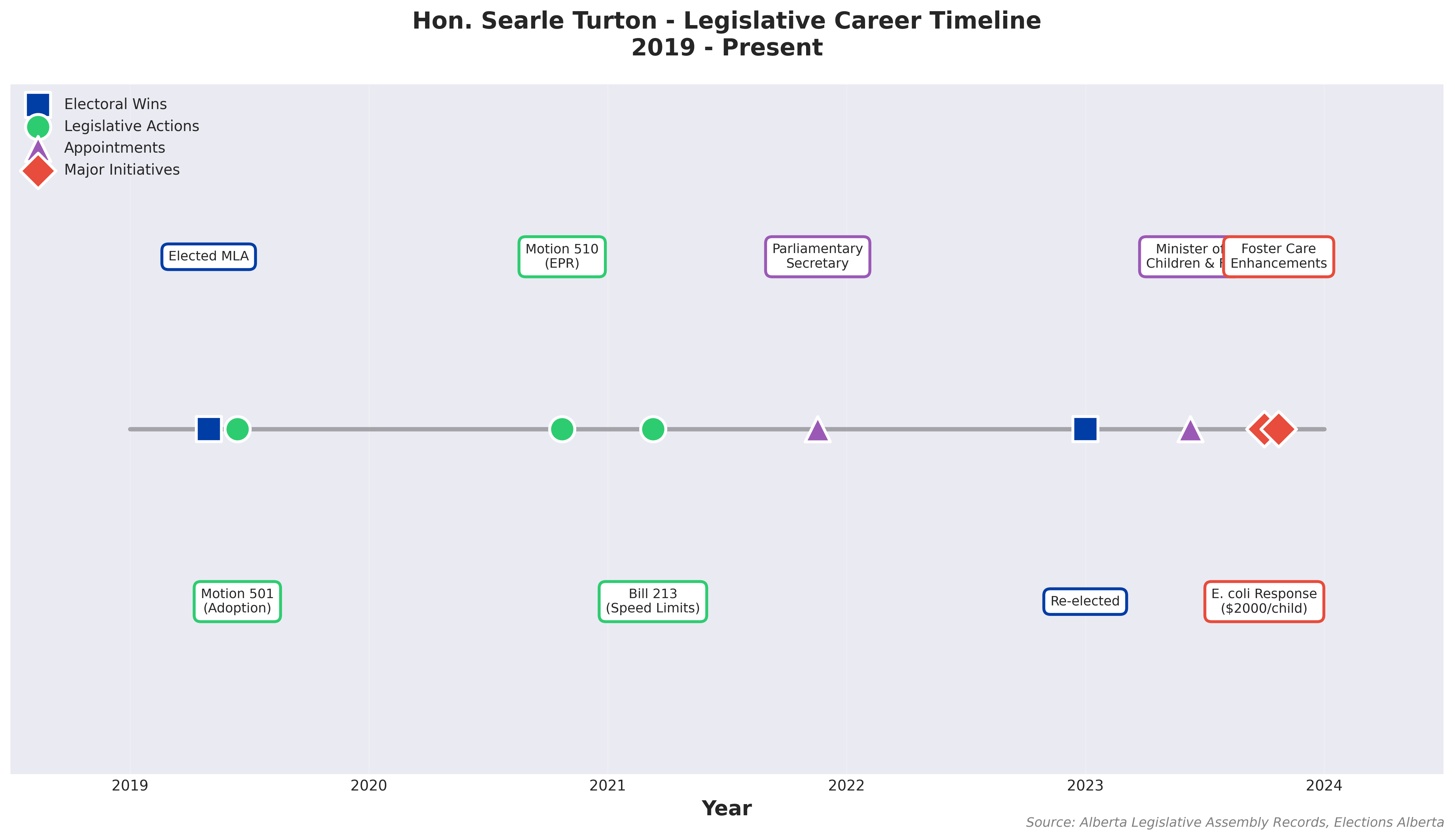
Searle Turton Legislative Accomplishments over Time

== Personal life ==
Turton married Amy Turton in 2001. They have two sons, Aiden and Xavier, and live in Spruce Grove. In his spare time, Turton enjoys playing board games, reading, travelling, skiing, and playing volleyball, soccer, tennis, and pickleball.

== Electoral history ==
=== 2023 general election ===
2023 Alberta general election: Spruce Grove-Stony Plain
Party	Candidate	Votes	%	±%
United Conservative	Searle Turton	14,365	56.99	-2.36
New Democratic	Chantal Saramaga-McKenzie	10,197	40.45	+11.10
Green	Daniel Birrell	422	1.67	–
Solidarity Movement	Darlene Clarke	223	0.88	–
Total		25,207	99.57	–
Rejected and declined		108	0.43	
Turnout		25,315	61.52	
Eligible voters		41,150		
United Conservative hold		Swing		-6.73
Source(s) Source: Elections Alberta

=== 2019 general election ===
2019 Alberta general election: Spruce Grove-Stony Plain
Party	Candidate	Votes	%	±%
United Conservative	Searle Turton	15,843	59.35%	11.15%
New Democratic	Erin Babcock	7,836	29.36%	12.38%
Alberta Party	Ivan G. Boles	2,597	9.73%	4.58%
Alberta Independence	Jody Crocker	417	1.56%	–
Total		26,693	–	–
Rejected, spoiled and declined		47	77	16
Eligible electors / turnout		37,296	71.74%	–
United Conservative pickup new district.				
Source(s) Source: "82 - Spruce Grove-Stony Plain, 2019 Alberta general election". officialresults.elections.ab.ca. Elections Alberta. Alberta. Chief Electoral Officer (2019). 2019 General Election. A Report of the Chief Electoral Officer. Volume II (PDF) (Report). Vol. 2. Edmonton, Alta.: Elections Alberta. pp. 399–403. ISBN 978-1-988620-12-1.

== Breakdown by year ==
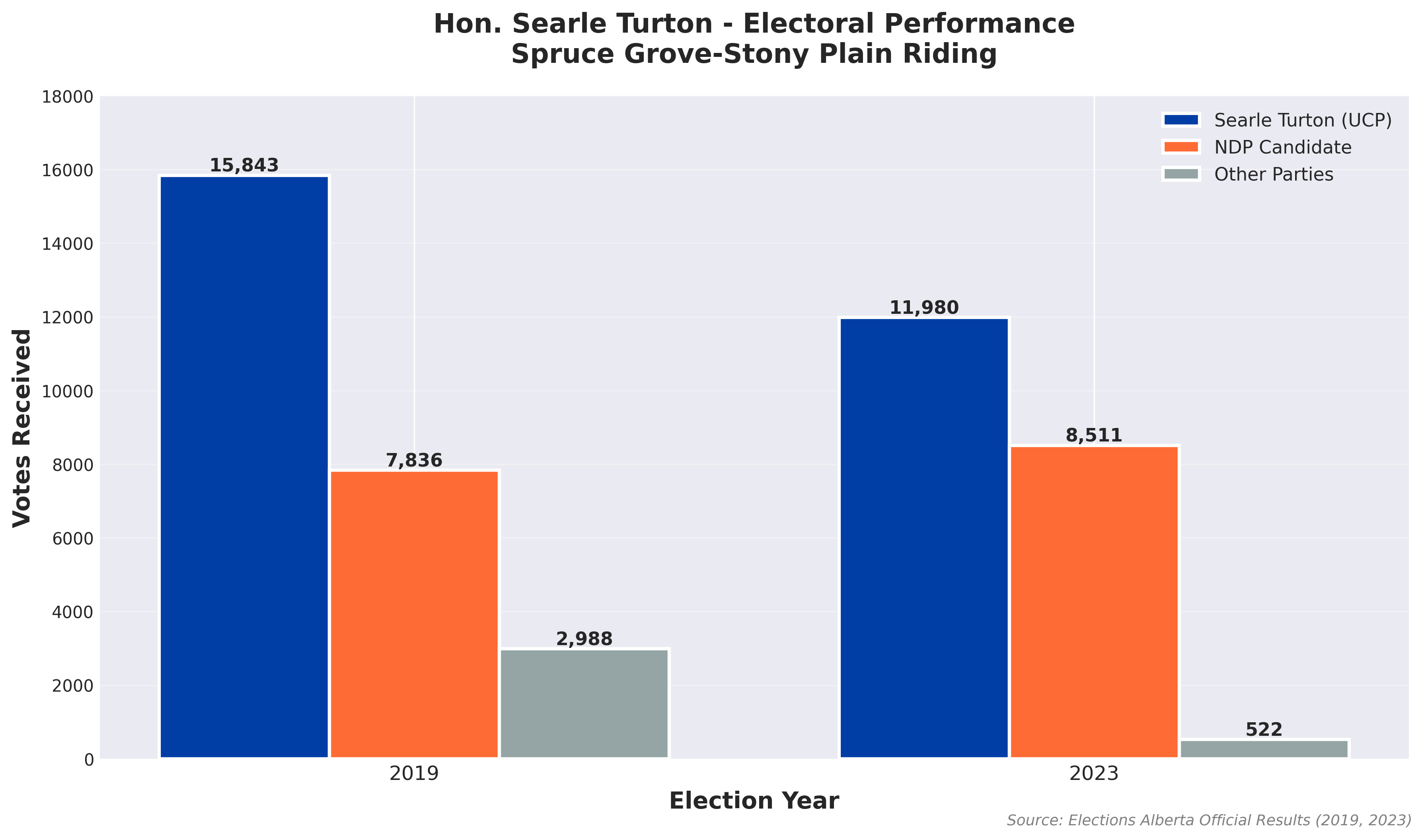
Overall Election Performance for 2019 and 2023 elections for the Spruce Grove - Stony Plain Riding

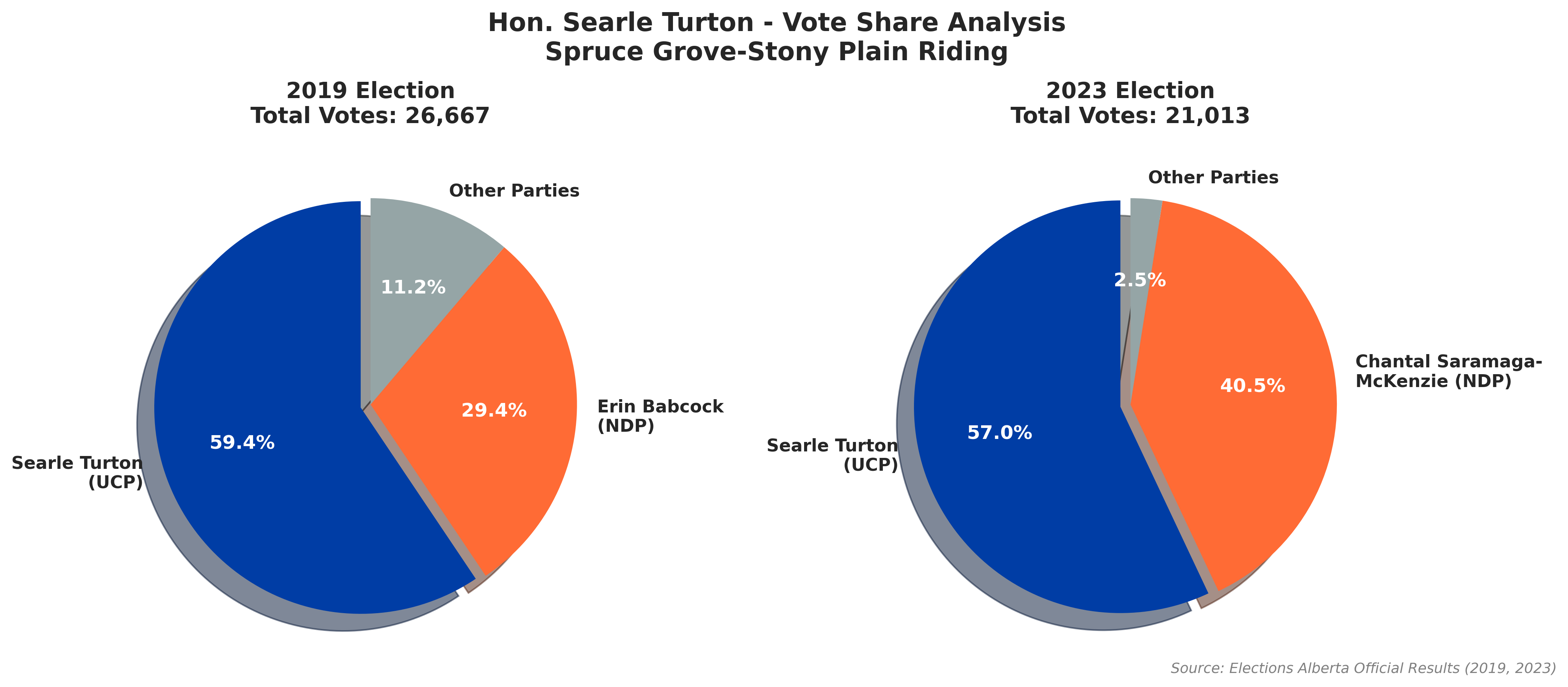
Vote Share Analysis for 2019 and 2023 elections for the Spruce Grove - Stony Plain Riding
