= Boeing 737 =

Single-aisle airliner family

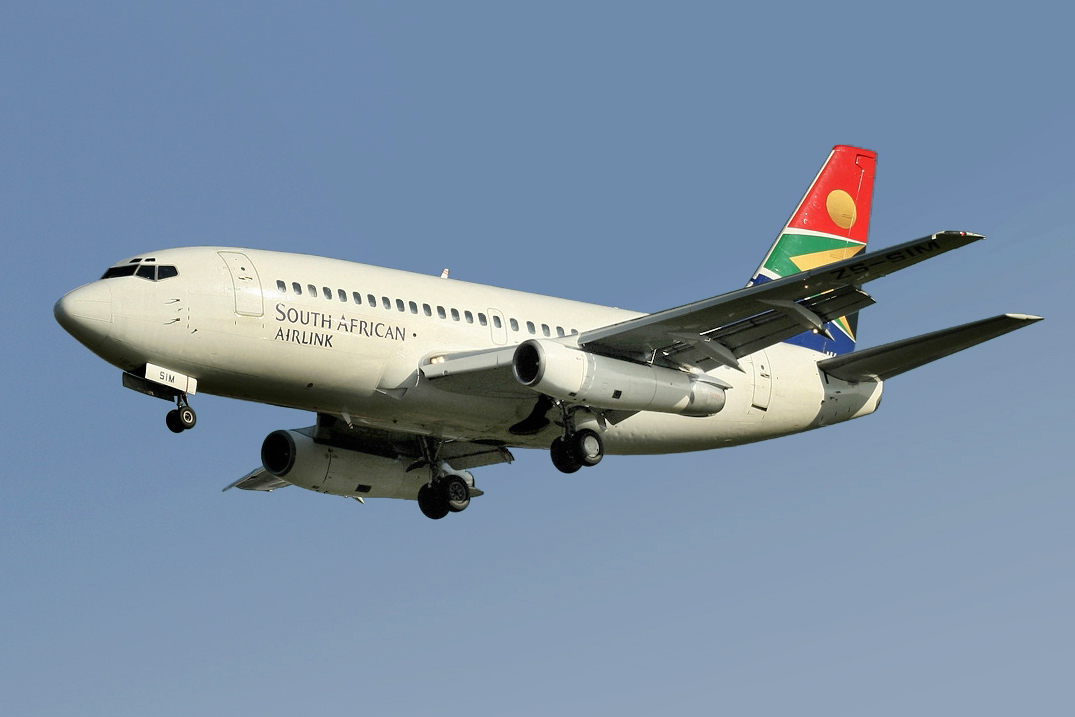
- A Boeing 737-200, the first mass-produced 737 model, in operation with South African Airlink in 2007

General information
- Role: Narrow-body jet airliner
- National origin: United States
- Manufacturer: Boeing
- Status: In service
- Primary users: Southwest Airlines: Ryanair; United Airlines; American Airlines
- Number built: 12,772 as of October 2026

History
- Manufactured: 1966–present
- Introduction date: February 10, 1968, with Lufthansa
- First flight: April 9, 1967; 59 years ago
- Variants: Boeing T-43; Boeing P-8 Poseidon; Boeing C-40; Boeing E-7 Wedgetail
- Developed into: Boeing 737 Classic; Boeing 737 Next Generation; Boeing 737 MAX

The Boeing 737 is an American narrow-body aircraft produced by Boeing at its factories in Washington state. Developed to supplement the Boeing 727 on short and thin routes, the twinjet retained the Boeing 707 fuselage width and six abreast seating but with only two underwing engines. Envisioned in 1964, the Boeing 737-100 made its first flight in April 1967 and entered service in February 1968 with Lufthansa. The more popular lengthened 737-200 entered service in April 1968, and subsequently the 737 evolved through four generations, offering numerous variants for 85 to 215 passengers.

The first generation 737-100/200 variants were powered by Pratt & Whitney JT8D low-bypass turbofan engines and offered seating for 85 to 130 passengers. The second generation 737 Classic -300/400/500 variants were launched in 1980 and introduced in 1984, featuring more fuel-efficient CFM56-3 high-bypass turbofans, and offering 110 to 168 seats. Introduced in 1997, the third generation 737 Next Generation (NG) -600/700/800/900 variants have updated CFM56-7 high-bypass turbofans, a larger wing and an upgraded glass cockpit, and seat 108 to 215 passengers. The fourth and latest generation, the 737 MAX -7/8/9/10 variants, are powered by CFM LEAP-1B high-bypass turbofans and accommodate 138 to 204 people, entering service in 2017. Boeing Business Jet versions have been produced since the 737NG, as well as military models.

As of October 2026, 17,791 Boeing 737s have been ordered and 12,772 delivered. It was the best-selling commercial aircraft until being surpassed by the competing Airbus A320 family in October 2019, and maintained the lead in total deliveries over the A320 until September 2025. Initially, its main competitor was the McDonnell Douglas DC-9, followed by its MD-80/MD-90 derivatives. In 2013, the global 737 fleet had completed more than 184 million flights over 264 million block hours since its entry into service. The 737 MAX, designed to compete with the A320neo, was grounded worldwide between March 2019 and November 2020 following two fatal crashes.

== Development ==
=== Initial design ===
1964 concept with tail mounted engines

Boeing had been studying short-haul jet aircraft designs, and saw a need for a new aircraft to supplement the 727 on short and thin routes. Preliminary design work began on May 11, 1964, based on research that indicated a market for a fifty to sixty passenger airliner flying routes of 50 to 1,000 miles (100 to 1,600 km).

The initial concept featured podded engines on the aft fuselage, a T-tail as with the 727, and five-abreast seating. Engineer Joe Sutter relocated the engines to the wings which lightened the structure and simplified the accommodation of six-abreast seating in the fuselage. The engine nacelles were mounted directly to the underside of the wings, without pylons, allowing the landing gear to be shortened, thus lowering the fuselage to improve baggage and passenger access. Relocating the engines from the aft fuselage also allowed the horizontal stabilizer to be attached to the aft fuselage instead of as a T-tail. Many designs for the engine attachment strut were tested in the wind tunnel and the optimal shape for high speed was found to be one which was relatively thick, filling the narrow channels formed between the wing and the top of the nacelle, particularly on the outboard side.

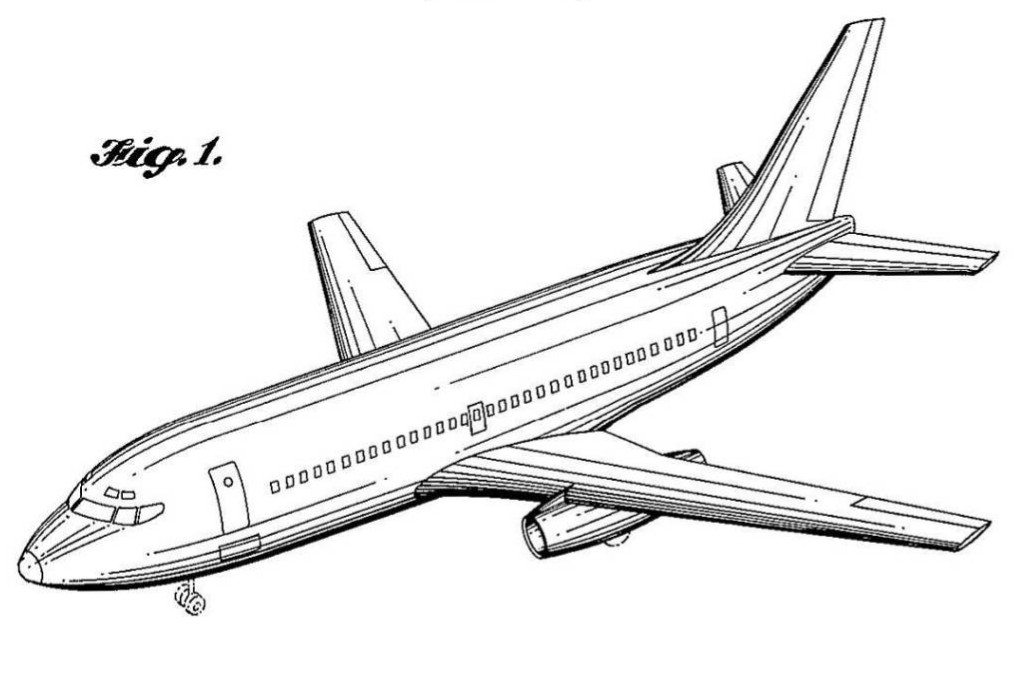
October 18, 1966, Jet aircraft patent, filed June 22, 1965, by John Steiner and Joe Sutter for Boeing

At the time, Boeing was far behind its competitors; the SE 210 Caravelle had been in service since 1959, and the BAC One-Eleven (BAC-111), Douglas DC-9, and Fokker F28 were already into flight certification. To expedite development, Boeing used 60% of the structure and systems of the existing 727, particularly the fuselage, which differs in length only. This 148-inch (3.76 m) wide fuselage cross-section permitted six-abreast seating compared to the rivals' five-abreast. The 727's fuselage was derived from the 707.

The proposed wing airfoil sections were based on those of the 707 and 727, but somewhat thicker; altering these sections near the nacelles achieved a substantial drag reduction at high Mach numbers. The engine chosen was the Pratt & Whitney JT8D-1 low-bypass ratio turbofan engine, delivering 14,500 pounds-force (64 kN) of thrust.

The concept design was presented in October 1964 at the Air Transport Association maintenance and engineering conference by chief project engineer Jack Steiner, where its elaborate high-lift devices raised concerns about maintenance costs and dispatch reliability.

=== Major design developments ===
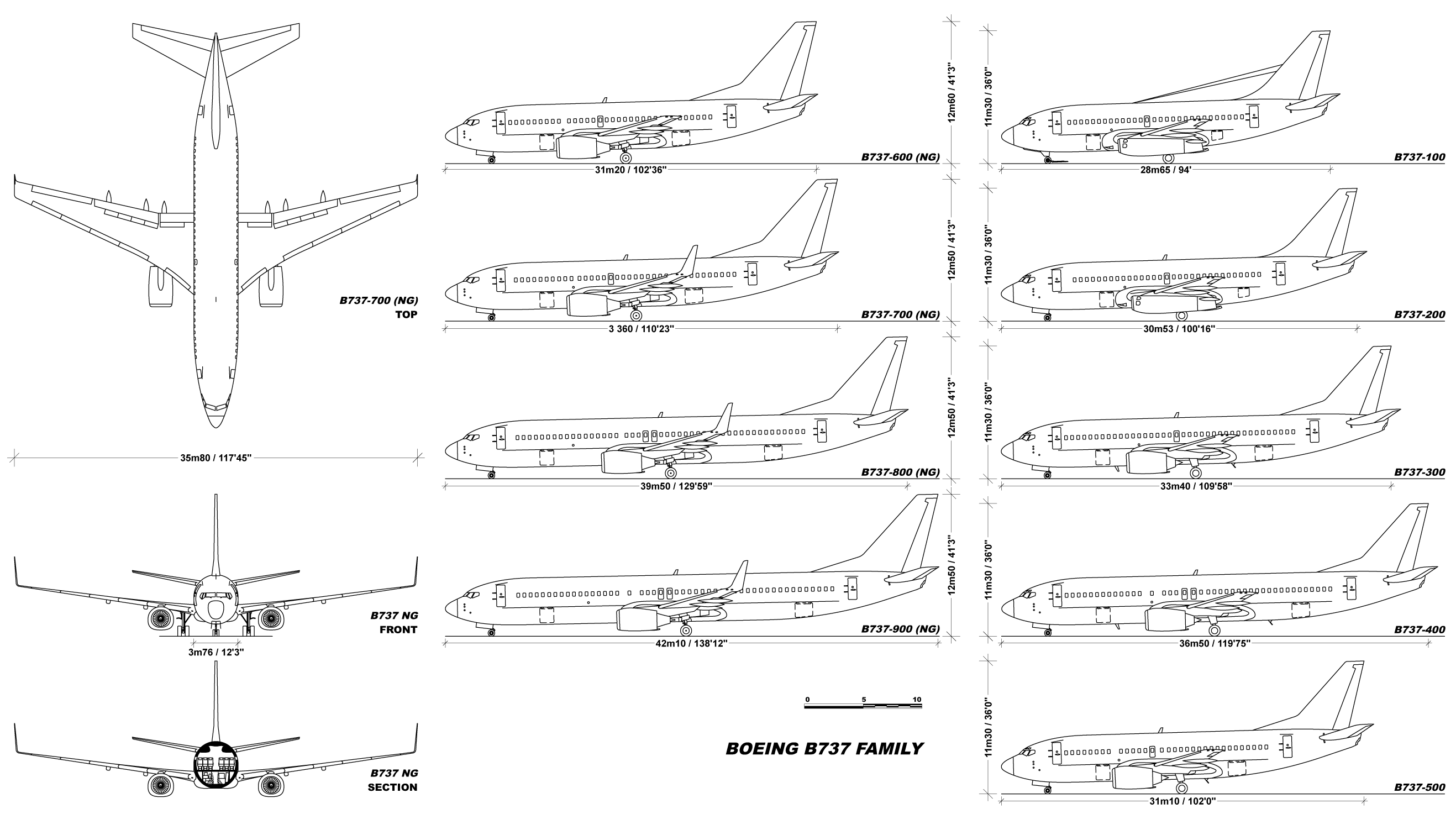
A comparison of the first three generations

The original 737 continued to be developed into thirteen passenger, cargo, corporate and military variants. These were later divided into what has become known as the four generations of the Boeing 737 family:

- The first generation "Original" series: the 737-100 and -200, also the military T-43 and CT-43, launched February 1965.
- The second generation "Classic" series: 737-300, -400 and -500, launched in 1979.
- The third generation "Next Generation" series: 737-600, -700, -800 and -900, also the military C-40 and P-8, launched late 1993.
- The fourth generation 737 MAX series: 737-7, -8, -9 and -10, launched August 2011.

=== Launch ===
The launch decision for the $150 million (~$1.17 billion in 2025) development was made by the board on February 1, 1965. The sales pitch was big-jet comfort on short-haul routes.

Lufthansa became the launch customer on February 19, 1965, with an order for 21 aircraft, worth $67 million (~$522 million in 2025) after the airline had been assured by Boeing that the 737 project would not be canceled. Consultation with Lufthansa over the previous winter had resulted in the seating capacity being increased to 100.

On April 5, 1965, Boeing announced an order by United Airlines for 40 737s. United wanted a slightly larger capacity than the 737-100, so the fuselage was stretched 36 inches (91 cm) ahead of, and 40 inches (102 cm) behind the wing. The longer version was designated the 737-200, with the original short-body aircraft becoming the 737-100. Detailed design work continued on both variants simultaneously.

=== Introduction ===
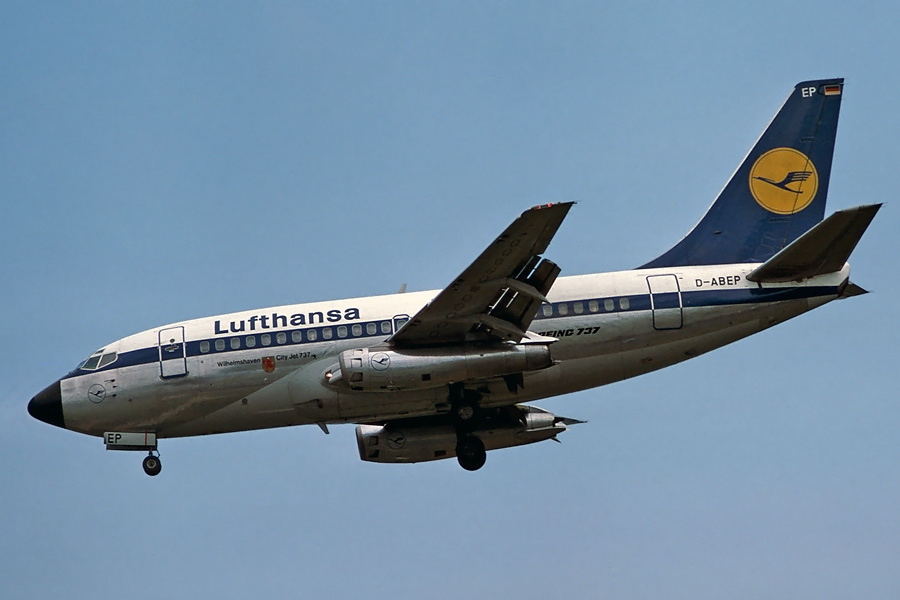
737-100 introduced by Lufthansa on February 10, 1968

The first -100 was rolled out on January 17, 1967, and took its maiden flight on April 9, 1967, piloted by Brien Wygle and Lew Wallick. After several test flights, the Federal Aviation Administration (FAA) issued Type Certificate A16WE certifying the 737-100 for commercial flight on December 15, 1967. It was the first aircraft to have, as part of its initial certification, approval for Category II approaches, which refers to a precision instrument approach and landing with a decision height between 98 and 197 feet (30 and 60 m). Lufthansa received its first aircraft on December 28, 1967, and on February 10, 1968, became the first non-American airline to launch a new Boeing aircraft. Lufthansa was the only significant customer to purchase the 737-100 and only 30 aircraft were produced.

The -200 was rolled out on June 29, 1967, and had its maiden flight on August 8, 1967. It was then certified by the FAA on December 21, 1967. The inaugural flight for United Airlines took place on April 28, 1968, from Chicago to Grand Rapids, Michigan. The lengthened -200 was widely preferred over the -100 by airlines. The improved version, the 737-200 Advanced, was introduced into service by All Nippon Airways on May 20, 1971.

The 737 original model with its variants, known later as the Boeing 737 Original, initially competed with Sud Aviation Caravelle , BAC One-Eleven and Douglas DC-9 due to their earlier entry into service, and later primarily with the McDonnell Douglas DC-9, and its MD-80 derivatives as the two European types became less competitive. Sales were low in the early 1970s and, after a peak of 114 deliveries in 1969, only 22 737s were shipped in 1972 with 19 in backlog. The US Air Force saved the program by ordering T-43s, which were modified Boeing 737-200s. African airline orders kept the production running until the 1978 US Airline Deregulation Act, which improved demand for six-abreast narrow-body aircraft. Demand further increased after being re-engined with the CFM56. The 737 went on to become the highest-selling commercial aircraft in terms of orders until surpassed by the competing Airbus A320 family in October 2019, and maintained the lead in total deliveries until October 2025.

The fuselage is manufactured in Wichita, Kansas, by Boeing spin-off company Spirit AeroSystems, before being moved by rail to Washington. The Renton factory has three assembly lines for the 737 MAX, and the Everett factory has one line. The Everett line started production in July 2026.

== Generations and variants ==
=== 737 Original (first generation) ===
The Boeing 737 Original is the name given to the -100 and -200 series of the Boeing 737 family. These are sometimes referred to by the nickname 737 Jurassic.

==== 737-100 ====
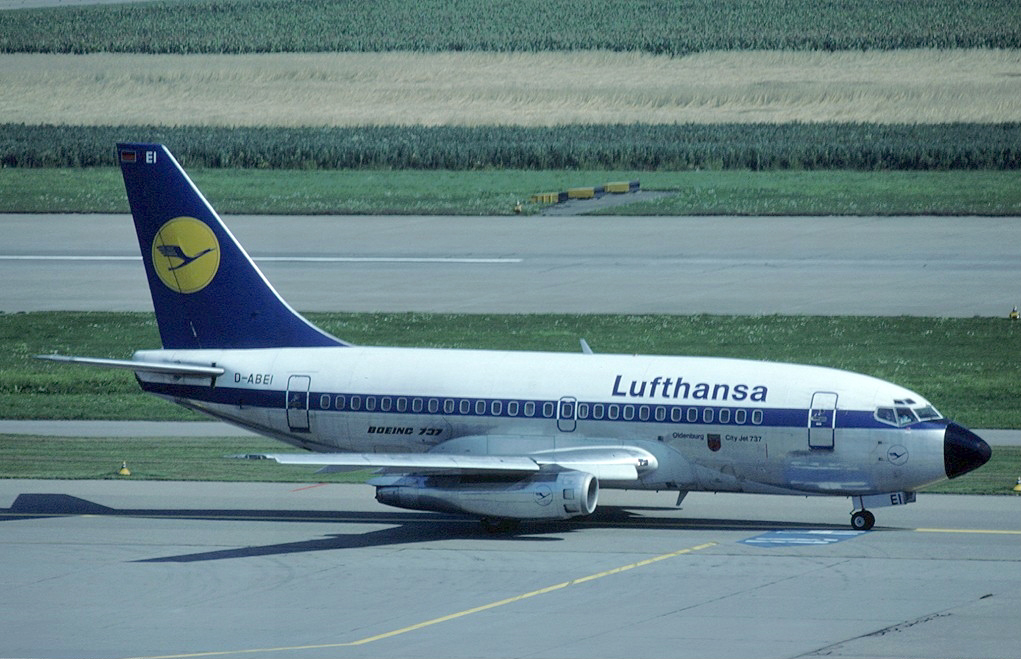
A Lufthansa Boeing 737-100 at Zurich Airport in 1981

The first variant was the 737-100, the smallest of the 737 aircraft family, which was launched in February 1965 and entered service with Lufthansa in February 1968. In 1968, its unit cost was US$3,600,000 (equivalent to $33,300,000 in 2025). Only 30 737-100s were produced: 22 for Lufthansa, five for Malaysia–Singapore Airlines (MSA) and two for Avianca with the final aircraft delivered to MSA on October 31, 1969. This variant was largely overshadowed by its bigger 737-200 sibling, which entered service two months later.

The original engine nacelles incorporated thrust reversers taken from the 727 outboard nacelles. They proved to be relatively ineffective and tended to lift the aircraft up off the runway when deployed. This reduced the downforce on the main wheels thereby reducing the effectiveness of the wheel brakes. In 1968, an improvement to the thrust reversal system was introduced. A 48-inch (120 cm) tailpipe extension was added and new target-style thrust reversers were incorporated. The thrust reverser doors were set 35 degrees away from the vertical to allow the exhaust to be deflected inboard and over the wings and outboard and under the wings. The improvement became standard on all aircraft after March 1969, and a retrofit was provided for active aircraft. Longer nacelle/wing fairings were introduced, and the airflow over the flaps and slats was improved. The production line also introduced an improvement to the flap system, allowing increased use during takeoff and landing. All these changes gave the aircraft a boost to payload and range, and improved short-field performance.

Both the first and last 737-100s became the last 737-100s in service. The first aircraft used by Boeing as prototype under registration N73700 was later ordered by and delivered to NASA on July 26, 1973, which then operated it under registration N515NA and retired it after 30 years on September 27, 2003. The last 737-100 built and also the last operating was originally sold to MSA, transferred to Air Florida, before being used as a VIP aircraft by the Mexican Air Force for 23 years under registration TP-03. TP-03 would be broken up in 2006. The first 737-100, NASA 515, is on static display in the Museum of Flight in Seattle and is the last surviving example of the type.

==== 737-200 ====
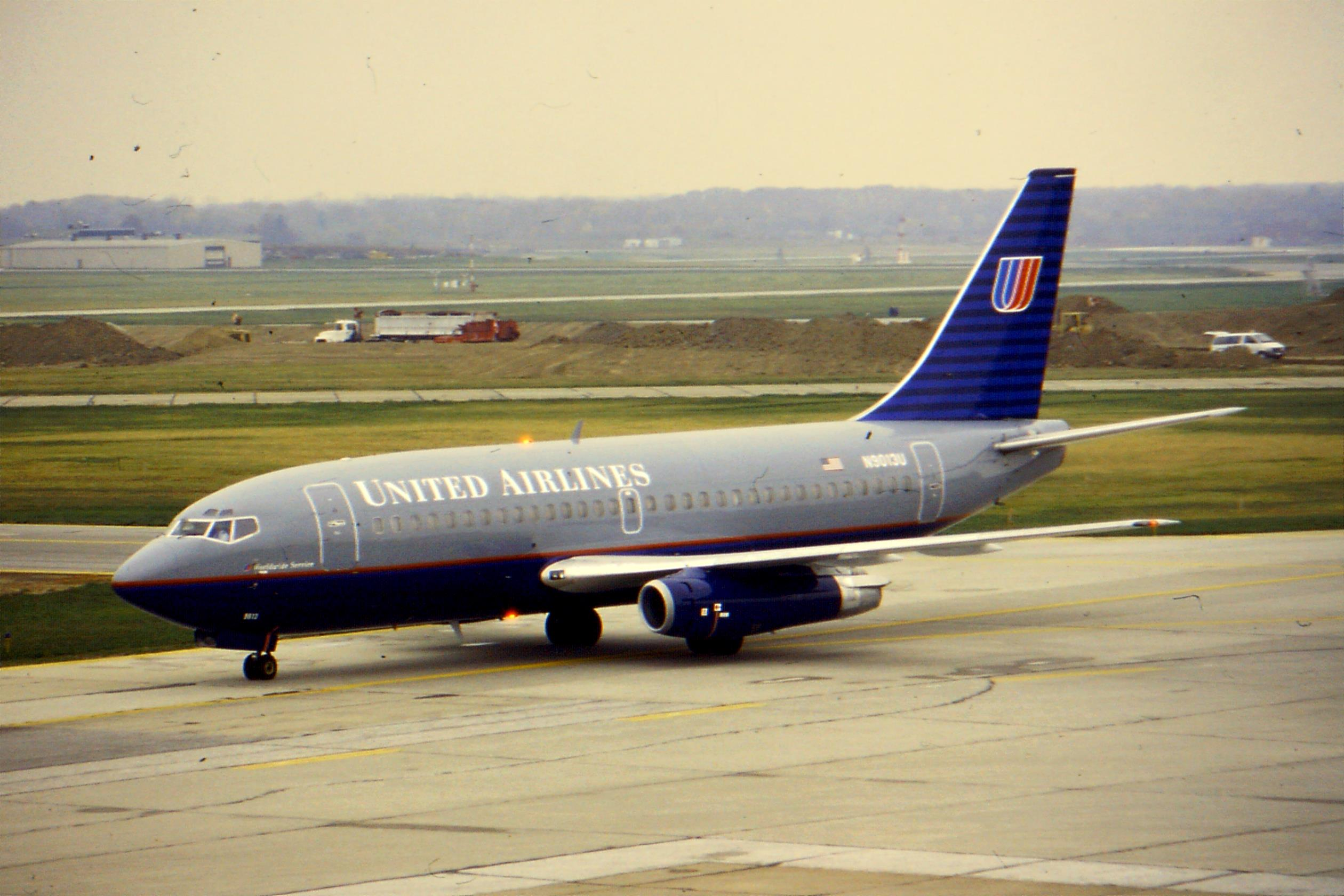
A 737-200 of its launch customer, United Airlines (1994). The -200 was one of the most popular variants, with 1095 units sold.

The 737-200 was a 737-100 with an extended fuselage, launched by an order from United Airlines in 1965 and entered service with the launch customer in April 1968. Its unit cost was US$4.0M (1968) ($37M today). The -200's unit cost was US$5.2M (1972) ($40M today). The 737-200 Advanced is an improved version of the -200, introduced into service by All Nippon Airways on May 20, 1971. After aircraft #135, the 737-200 Advanced has improved aerodynamics, automatic wheel brakes, more powerful engines, more fuel capacity, and hence a 15% increase in payload and range over the original -200s and respectively -100s. The 737-200 Advanced became the production standard in June 1971. Boeing also provided the 737-200C (Combi), which allowed for conversion between passenger and cargo use and the 737-200QC (Quick Change), which facilitated a rapid conversion between roles. The 1,114th and last delivery of a -200 series aircraft was in August 1988 to Xiamen Airlines.

After 40 years, in March 2008, the final 737-200 aircraft in the U.S. flying scheduled passenger service were phased out, with the last flights of Aloha Airlines. As of 2018, the variant still saw regular service through North American charter operators such as Sierra Pacific Airlines.

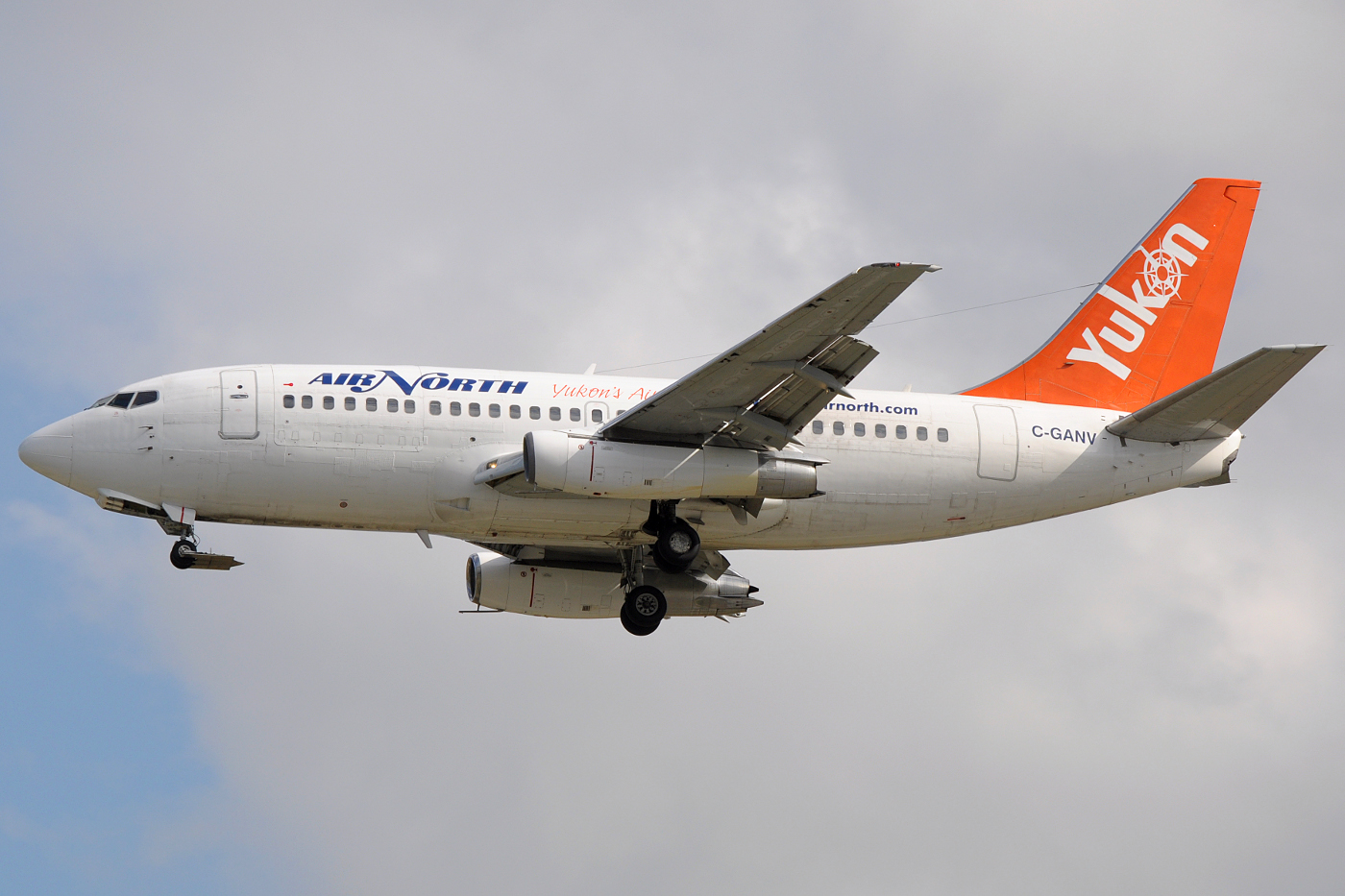
An Air North 737-200 fitted with a gravel kit, 2011

The short-field capabilities of the 737-200 led Boeing to offer the Unpaved Strip Kit. This option reduced foreign object damage when operated on remote, unimproved or unpaved runways, that competing jetliners could not use safely. The kit included a gravel deflector on the nose gear and a vortex dissipator extending from the front of the engine. Alaska Airlines used the gravel kit for some of its combi aircraft rural operations in Alaska until retiring its -200 fleet in 2007. Air Inuit, Nolinor Aviation and Buffalo Airways still use the gravel kit in Northern Canada. Canadian North also operated a gravel-kitted 737-200 Combi, but this was due to be retired in early 2023.

As of September 2023, a relatively high number of 737-200s remain in service compared to other early jet airliners, with fifty examples actively flying for thirty carriers. During the 737 MAX groundings, older 737s, including the 200 and Classic series, were in demand for leasing.

==== Comparison of variants ====
Below is a list of major differences between the original 737 variants.

Variant	737-100	737-200
Passenger capacity	118	130
Length	94 ft (29 m)	100 ft 2 in (30.53 m)
Cargo	650 ft^{3} (18 m^{3})	875 ft^{3} (24.8 m^{3})
MTOW	110,000 lb (50,000 kg)	128,100 lb (58,100 kg)
OEW	62,000 lb (28,000 kg)	65,300 lb (29,600 kg)
Fuel capacity	4,720 US gal (17,900 L)	5,970 US gal (22,600 L) (Note: With 810 US gal (3,100 L) auxiliary fuel tank)
Range	1,540 nmi (2,850 km; 1,770 mi)	2,600 nmi (4,800 km; 3,000 mi) (Note: 120 passengers)
Thrust (×2)	14,000 lbf (62 kN)	14,500–16,400 lbf (64–73 kN)

=== 737 Classic (second generation) ===
The Boeing 737 Classic is the name given to the 737-300/400/500 series after the introduction of the -600/700/800/900 series of the Boeing 737 family. Produced from 1984 to 2000, a total of 1,988 Classic series were delivered.

Close to the next major upgrade of single aisle aircraft at Airbus and Boeing, the price of jet fuel reached a peak in 2008, when airlines devoted 40% of the retail price of an air ticket to pay for fuel, versus 15% in 2000. Consequently, in that year carriers retired Boeing 737 Classic aircraft to reduce fuel consumption; replacements consisted of more efficient 737 Next Generation or A320 family aircraft. On June 4, 2008, United Airlines announced it would retire all 94 of its Classic 737 aircraft (64 737-300 and 30 737-500 aircraft), replacing them with A320 family jets taken from its Ted subsidiary, which had been shut down. This intensified the competition between the two giant aircraft manufacturers, which has since become a duopoly competition.

An optional upgrade with winglets became available for the Classic and NG series.

- The 737-300 and 737-500 can be retrofitted with Aviation Partners Boeing winglets, and the 737-300 retrofitted with winglets is designated the -300SP (Special Performance).
- WestJet was to launch the 737-600 with winglets, but dropped this plan in 2006.

==== 737-300 ====
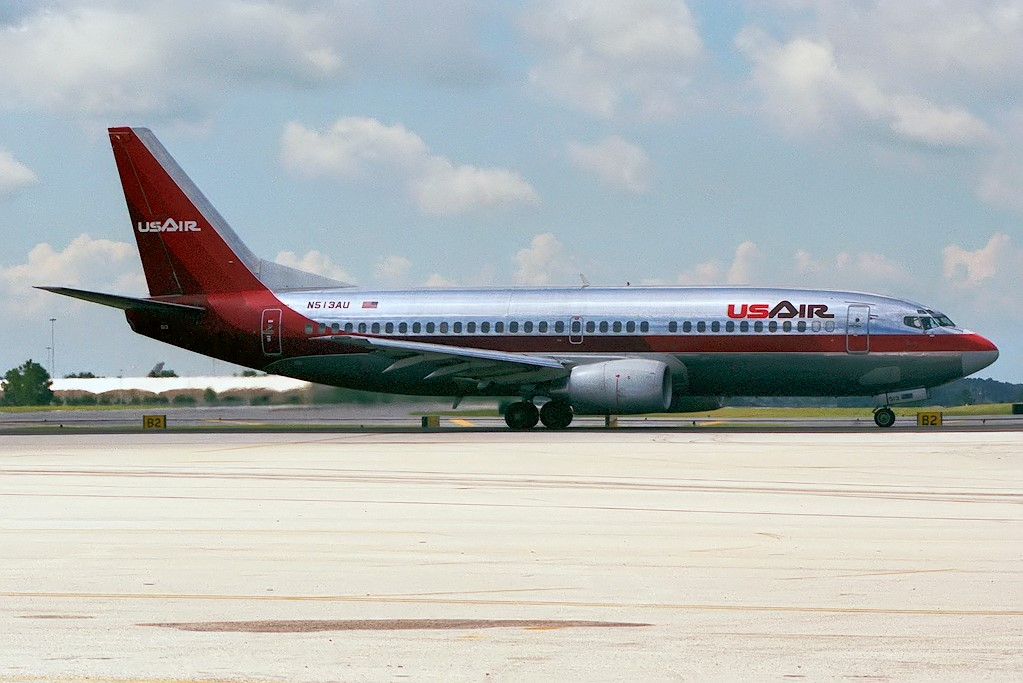
A 737-300 with larger CFM56 turbofans, introduced by USAir on November 28, 1984. This particular aircraft would later crash as USAir Flight 427.

Development began in 1979 for the 737's first major revision, which was originally introduced as the 'new generation' of the 737. Boeing wanted to increase capacity and range, incorporating improvements to upgrade the aircraft to modern specifications, while also retaining commonality with previous 737 variants. In 1980, preliminary aircraft specifications of the variant, dubbed 737-300, were released at the Farnborough Airshow. This first major upgrade series was later renamed 737 Classic. It competed primarily with the MD-80, its later derivative the MD-90, and the newcomer Airbus A320 family.

Boeing engineer Mark Gregoire led a design team, which cooperated with CFM International to select, modify and deploy a new engine and nacelle that would make the 737-300 into a viable aircraft. They chose the CFM56-3B-1 high-bypass turbofan engine to power the aircraft, which yielded significant gains in fuel economy and a reduction in noise, but also posed an engineering challenge, given the low ground clearance of the 737 and the larger diameter of the engine over the original Pratt & Whitney engines. Gregoire's team and CFM solved the problem by reducing the size of the fan (which made the engine slightly less efficient than it had been forecast to be), placing the engine ahead of the wing, and by moving engine accessories to the sides of the engine pod, giving the engine a distinctive non-circular "hamster pouch" air intake. Earlier customers for the CFM56 included the U.S. Air Force with its program to re-engine KC-135 tankers.

The passenger capacity of the aircraft was increased to 149 by extending the fuselage around the wing by 9 feet 5 inches (2.87 m). The wing incorporated several changes for improved aerodynamics. The wingtip was extended 9 inches (23 cm), and the wingspan by 1 foot 9 inches (53 cm). The leading-edge slats and trailing-edge flaps were adjusted. The tailfin was redesigned, the flight deck was improved with the optional EFIS (Electronic Flight Instrumentation System), and the passenger cabin incorporated improvements similar to those developed on the Boeing 757. The prototype -300, the 1,001st 737 built, first flew on February 24, 1984, with pilot Jim McRoberts. It and two production aircraft flew a nine-month-long certification program. The 737-300 retrofitted with Aviation Partners' winglets was designated the -300SP (Special Performance). The 737-300 was replaced by the 737-700 of the Next Generation series.

==== 737-400 ====
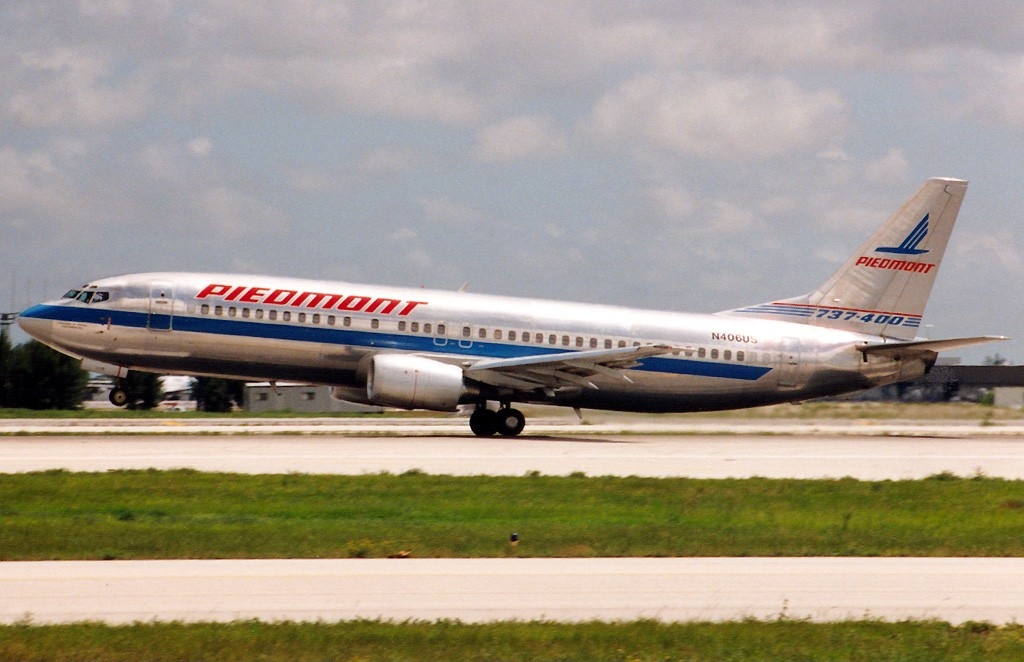
Stretched by 10 feet (3.0 m), the 737-400 entered service in October 1988 with Piedmont Airlines

The 737-400 was launched in 1985 to fill the gap between the 737-300 and the 757-200. In June 1986, Boeing announced the development of the 737-400, which stretched the fuselage a further 10 feet (3.0 m), increasing the capacity to 188 passengers, and requiring a tail bumper to prevent tailstrikes during take-off and a strengthened wing spar. The -400s first flight was on February 19, 1988, and, after a seven-month/500-hour flight-testing run, entered service with Piedmont Airlines that October. The last two -400s, i.e. the last 737 Classics series, were delivered to CSA Czech Airlines on February 28, 2000. The 737-400 was replaced by the 737-800 of the Next Generation series. The 737-400SF was a 737-400 converted to freighter, though it was not a model delivered by Boeing and hence the nickname Special Freighter (SF). Alaska Airlines was the first to convert one of their 400s from regular service to an aircraft with the ability to handle 10 pallets. The airline had also converted five more into fixed combi aircraft for half passenger and freight. These 737-400 Combi aircraft were retired in 2017 and replaced by the 737-700F of the Next Generation series.

==== 737-500 ====
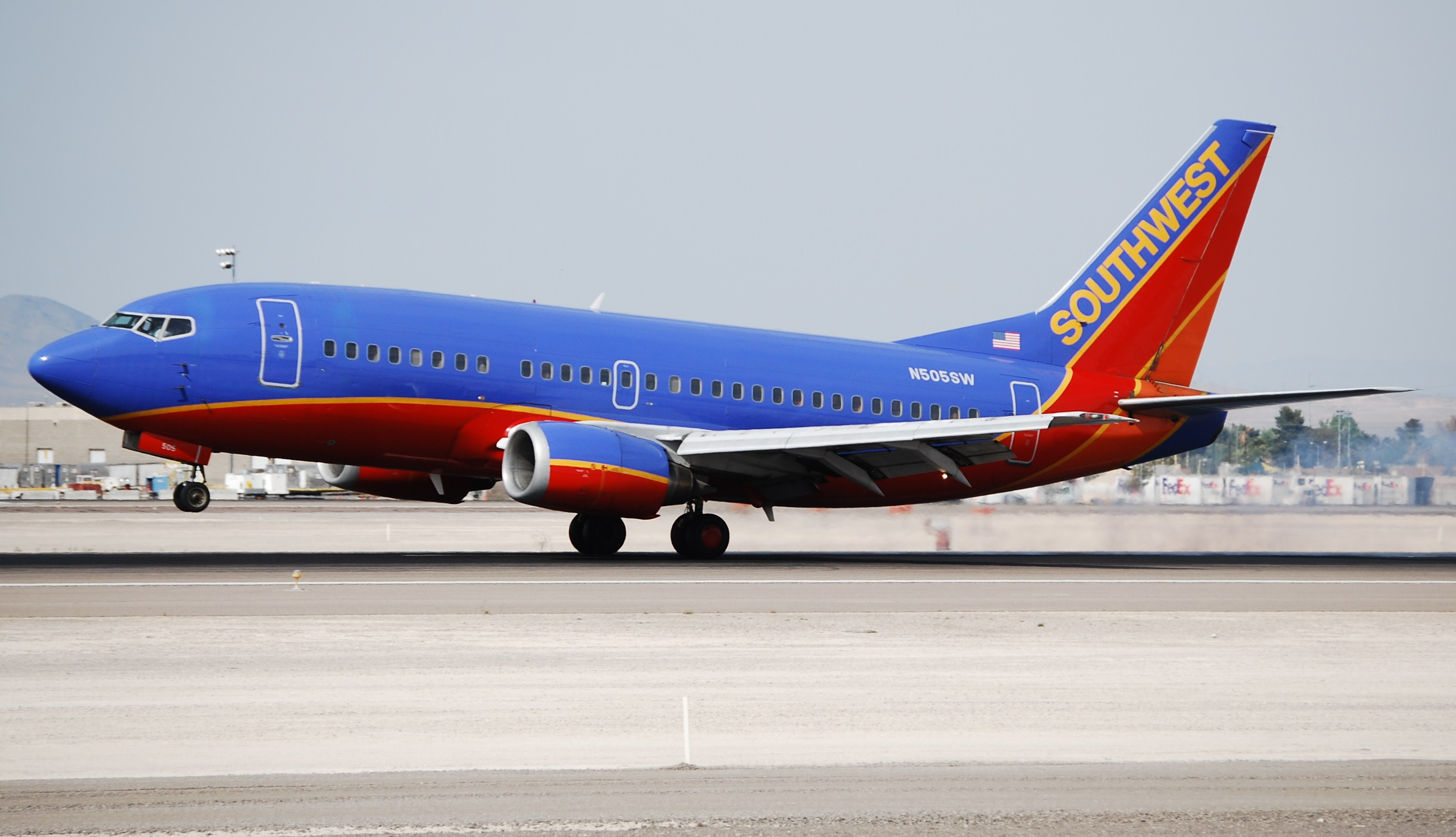
A Southwest Airlines 737-500 landing in Las Vegas in 2008

The 737-500 was offered as a modern and direct replacement of the 737-200. It was launched in 1987 by Southwest Airlines, with an order for 20 aircraft, and it flew for the first time on June 30, 1989. A single prototype flew 375 hours for the certification process, and on February 28, 1990, Southwest Airlines received the first delivery.

The -500 incorporated the improvements of the 737 Classic series, allowing longer routes with fewer passengers to be more economical than with the 737-300. The fuselage length of the 737-500 is 1 foot 7 inches (48 cm) longer than the 737-200, accommodating up to 140 passengers. Both glass and older-style mechanical cockpits arrangements were available. Using the CFM56-3 engine also gave a 25 percent increase in fuel efficiency over the older 737-200s P&W engines. The 737-500 has faced accelerated retirement due to its smaller size, after 21 years in service compared to 24 years for the -300. While a few 737-300s were slated for freighter conversion, no demand at all existed for a -500 freighter conversion. The 737-500 was replaced by the 737-600 of the Next Generation series, though the -600 was not as successful in total orders as the -500.

=== 737 NG (third generation) ===
The Boeing 737 Next Generation, abbreviated as 737 Next Gen or 737NG, is the name given to the -600, -700, -800 and -900 variants. It has been produced since 1996 and introduced in 1997, with a total order of 7,097 aircraft, of which 7,031 have been delivered as of May 2019. The primary goal was to re-engine the 737 with the high bypass ratio CFM56-7. By the early 1990s, as the MD-80 slowly withdrew from the competition following the introduction of the MD-90, it had become clear that the new A320 family was a serious threat to Boeing's market share. Airbus won previously loyal 737 customers, such as Lufthansa and United Airlines. In November 1993, to stay in the single aisle competition, Boeing's board of directors authorized the Next Generation program to mainly upgrade the 737 Classic series. In late 1993, after engineering trade studies and discussions with major customers, Boeing proceeded to launch a second derivative of the Boeing 737, the 737 Next Generation (NG) -600/700/800/900 series. It featured a redesigned wing with a wider wingspan and larger area, greater fuel capacity, longer range and higher MTOWs. It was equipped with CFM56-7 high pressure ratio engines, a glass cockpit, and upgraded interior configurations. The four main models of the series can accommodate seating for 108 to 215 passengers. It was further developed into additional versions such as the corporate Boeing Business Jet (BBJ) and military P-8 Poseidon aircraft. Following the merger between Boeing with McDonnell Douglas in 1997, the primary competitor for the 737NG series remained only the A320 family.

==== 737-600 ====
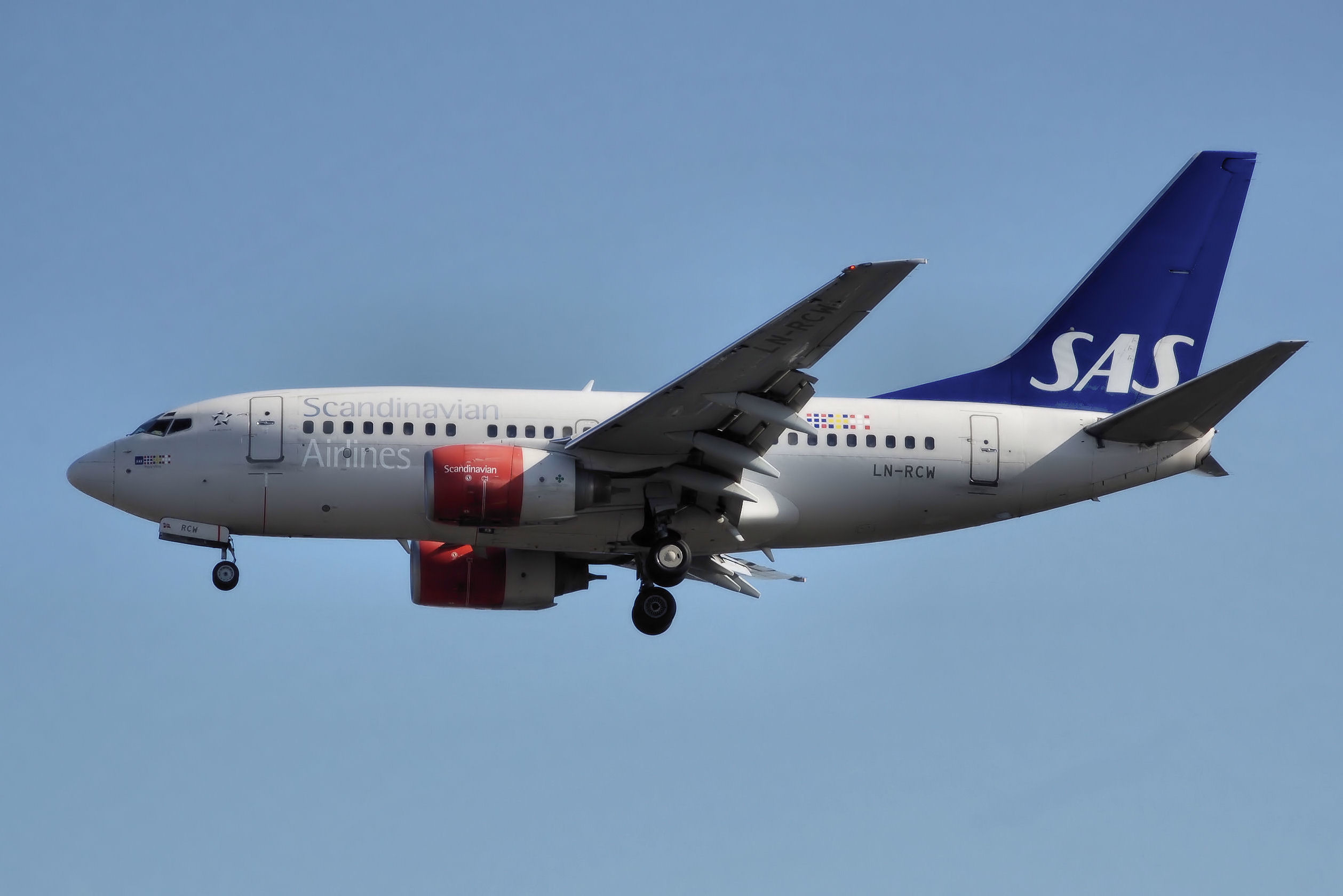
737-600 of Scandinavian Airlines, the launch customer

The 737-600 was the smallest of the Next-Generation models, replacing the 737-500. It had no winglets and was similar in size to the Airbus A318. Launch customer Scandinavian Airlines (SAS) placed its order in March 1995 and took the first delivery in September 1998. A total of 69 aircraft were produced, with the last one delivered to WestJet in 2006.

==== 737-700 ====
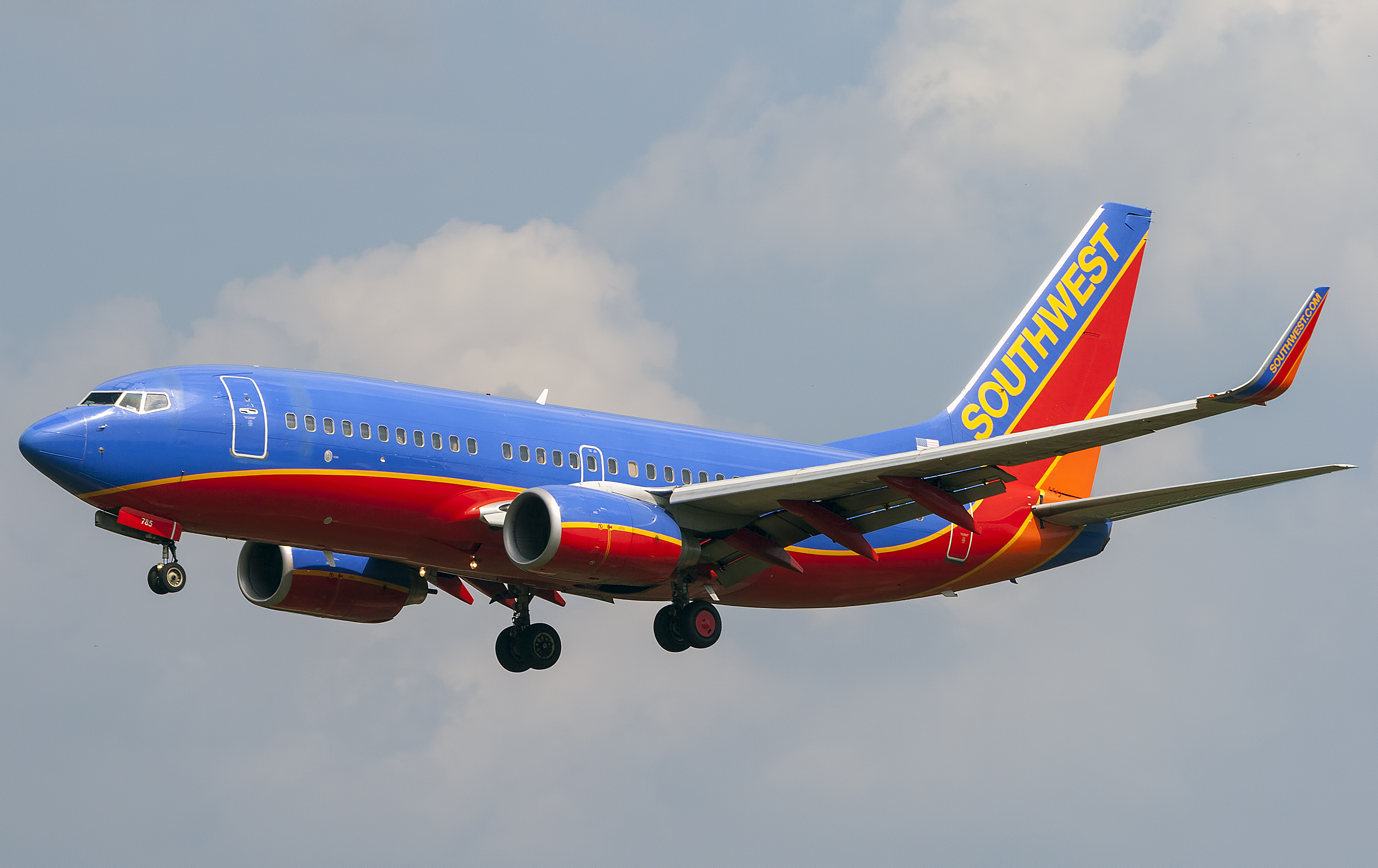
737-700 of Southwest Airlines, the launch customer

The 737-700, the first variant of the Next-Generation, was launched in November 1993 with an order of 63 aircraft. The -700 seats 126 passengers in a two-class or 149 passengers in a one-class layout. Launch customer Southwest Airlines took the first delivery in December 1997. The 737-700 replaced the 737-300 and competes with the Airbus A319.

The 737-700C is a convertible version where the seats can be removed to carry cargo instead. There is a large door on the left side of the aircraft. The United States Navy was the launch customer for the 737-700C under the military designation C-40 Clipper.

The 737-700ER (Extended Range) was launched on January 31, 2006, and featured the fuselage of the 737-700 and the wings and landing gear of the 737-800. A 737-700ER can typically accommodate 126 passengers in two classes with a range similar to the Airbus A319LR.

==== 737-800 ====
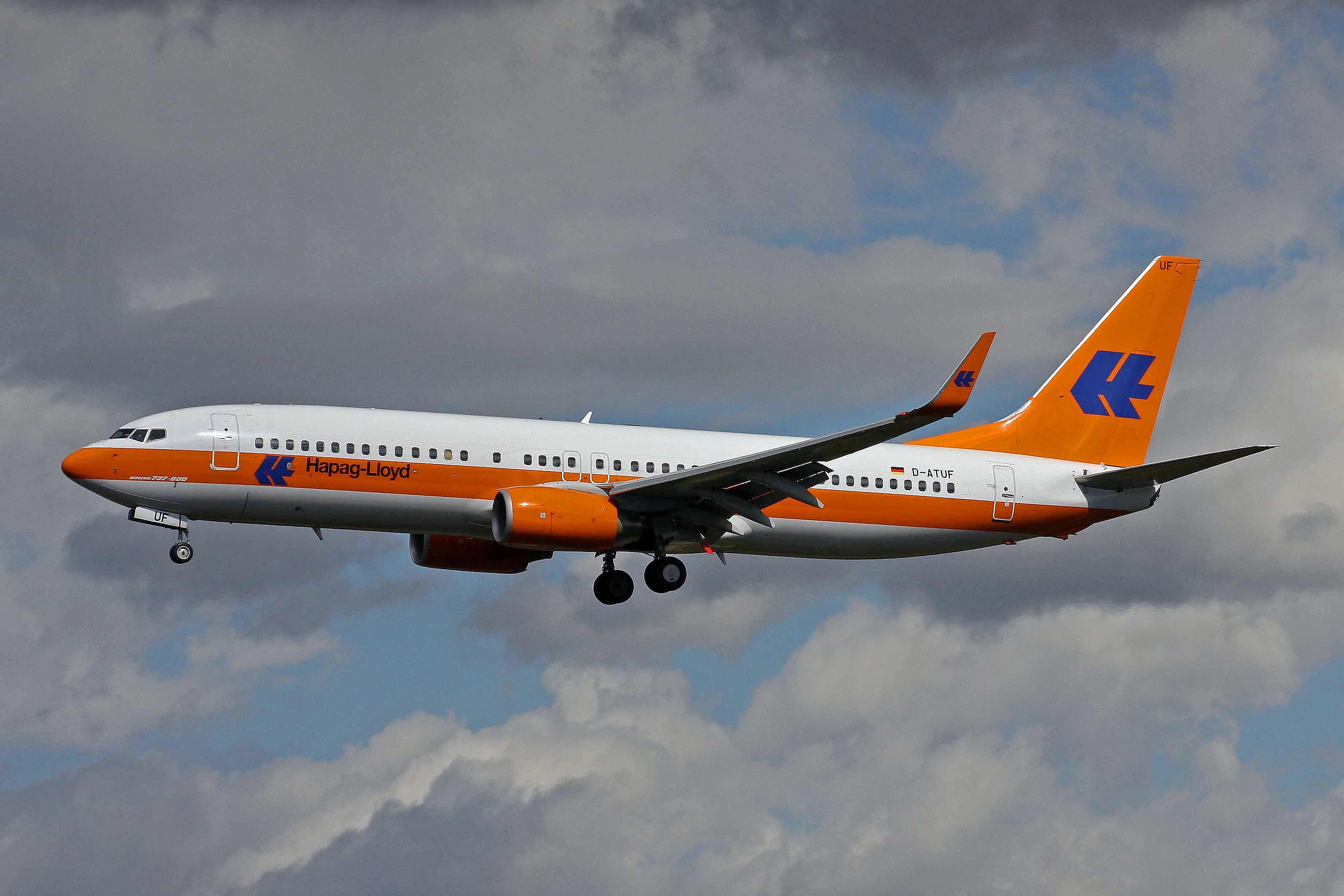
737-800 of Hapag-Lloyd, the launch customer

The 737-800 was a stretched version of the 737-700 launched on September 5, 1994, and first flew on July 31, 1997. The -800 seats 162 passengers in a two-class or 189 passengers in a high-density, one-class layout. Launch customer Hapag-Lloyd Flug (now TUIfly) received the first one in April 1998. The 737-800 replaced directly the -400 and aging 727-200 of US airlines. It filled also the gap left by Boeing's decision to discontinue the MD-80 and MD-90 aircraft, following Boeing's merger with McDonnell Douglas. The 737-800 is the most widely used narrowbody aircraft and competes primarily with the Airbus A320.

==== 737-900 ====
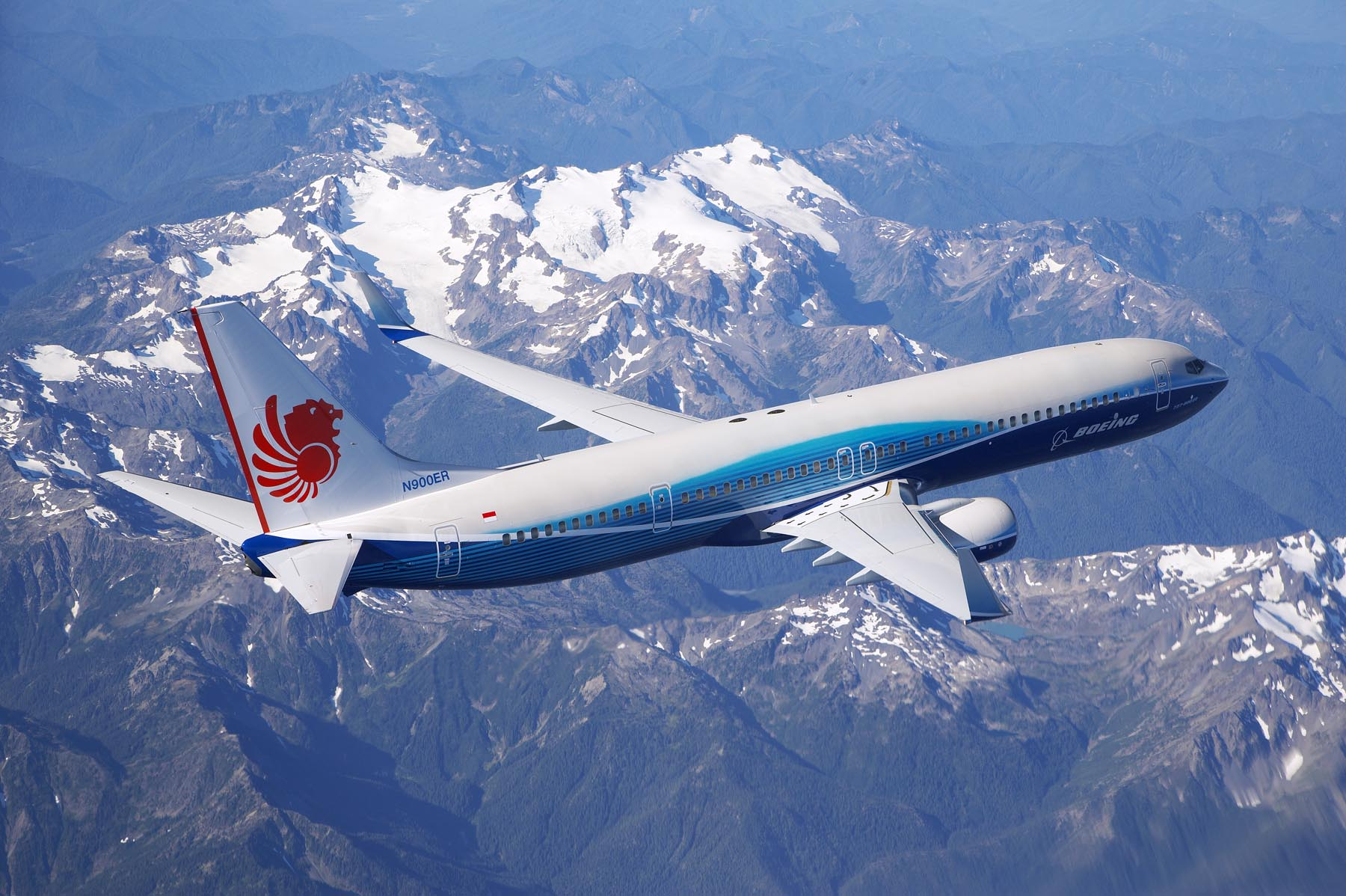
First flight of the 737-900ER in September 2006. The aircraft has Boeing's livery on the fuselage and launch customer Lion Air on the vertical stabilizer. The added exit door is visible aft of the wing.

The 737-900 was launched in November 1997 and took its first flight on August 3, 2000. It is longer than the -800, but retains the MTOW, fuel capacity, and exit configuration of the -800, essentially trading range for capacity. The exit configuration limits its seat capacity to approximately 177 in a two class and 189 in a high-density, one class layout. Launch customer Alaska Airlines received the first delivery in May 2001. Fifty-two were built.

The 737-900ER (Extended Range), the newest and largest variant of the 737NG generation, was launched in July 2005, first flew in September 2006, and first delivered to launch customer Lion Air in April 2007. An additional pair of exit doors and a flat rear pressure bulkhead increased its seating capacity to 180 passengers in a two-class and up to 220 passengers in a one-class configuration.

The -900ER partly closed the gap left by the discontinuation of the Boeing 757-200, and directly competes with the Airbus A321.

=== 737 MAX (fourth generation) ===
The Boeing 737 MAX is the name given to the main models 737 MAX 7/8/9/10 series and the higher-density MAX 200 variant of the Boeing 737 family. It is offered in four main variants, typically offering 138 to 230 seats and a range of 3,215 to 3,825 nautical miles [nmi] (5,954 to 7,084 km; 3,700 to 4,402 mi). The 737 MAX 7, MAX 8 (including the denser, 200-seat MAX 200), and MAX 9 replace the 737-700, -800, and -900 respectively. The further stretched 737 MAX 10 has also been added to the series. The aim was to re-engine the 737NG family using CFM LEAP-1B engines having very high bypass ratio, to compete with the Airbus A320neo family. On July 20, 2011, Boeing announced plans for a third major upgrade and respectively fourth generation of 737 series to be powered by the CFM LEAP-1B engine, with American Airlines intending to order 100 of these aircraft.

On August 30, 2011, Boeing confirmed the launch of the 737 new engine variant, to be called the Boeing 737 MAX. It was based on earlier 737 designs with more efficient LEAP-1B power plants, aerodynamic improvements (most notably split-tip winglets), and airframe modifications. It competes with the Airbus A320neo family that was launched in December 2010 and reached 1,029 orders by June 2011, breaking Boeing's monopoly with American Airlines, which had an order for 130 A320neos that July. The 737 MAX had its first flight on January 29, 2016, and gained FAA certification on March 8, 2017. The first delivery was a MAX 8 on May 6, 2017, to Lion Air's subsidiary Malindo Air, which put it into service on May 22, 2017. As of January 2019, the series has received 5,011 firm orders.

In March 2019, civil aviation authorities around the world grounded the 737 MAX following two hull loss crashes which caused 346 deaths. On December 16, 2019, Boeing announced that it would suspend production of the 737 MAX from January 2020, which was resumed in May 2020. In the midyear 2020, the FAA and Boeing conducted a series of recertification test flights. On November 18, 2020, the FAA cleared the MAX to return to service. Before individual aircraft could fly again, repairs were required as set out in an airworthiness directive from the FAA, and airline training programs required approval. Worldwide, the first airline to resume passenger service was Brazilian low-cost Gol, on December 9, 2020, and passenger service resumed in the U.S. with American Airlines on December 29, 2020.

==== 737 MAX 7 ====
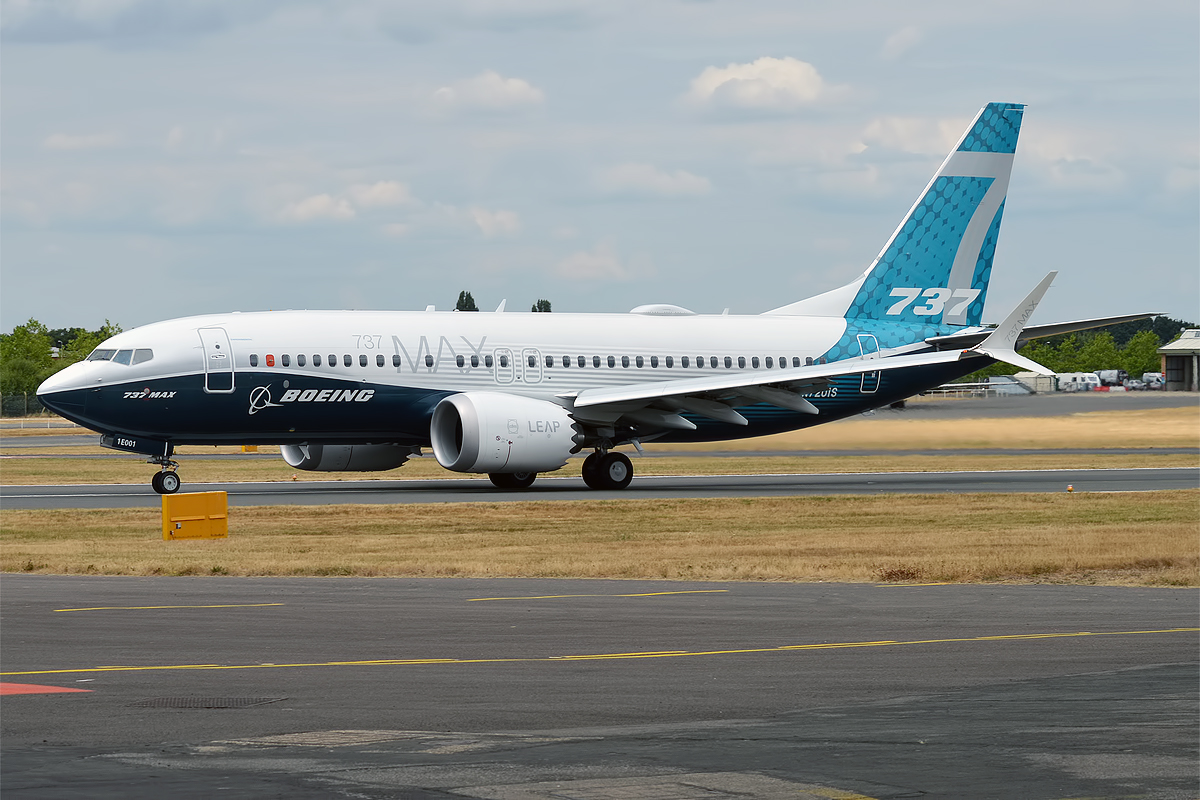
737 MAX 7 prototype in testing

The 737 MAX 7, a shortened variant of the MAX 8, was originally based on the 737-700, flying 1,000 nautical miles (1,900 km; 1,200 mi) farther and accommodating two more seat rows at 18% lower fuel costs per seat. The redesign uses the 737-8 wing and landing gear; a pair of over-wing exits rather than the single-door configuration; a 46-inch-longer (1,200 mm) aft fuselage and a 30-inch-longer (760 mm) longer forward fuselage; structural re-gauging and strengthening; and systems and interior modifications to accommodate the longer length. Entry into service with launch operator Southwest Airlines was originally expected in January 2019, but certification delays have pushed this back, with Boeing CEO David Calhoun saying certification was possible in the first half of 2025. The 737 MAX 7 replaced the 737-700 and was predicted to carry 12 more passengers and fly 400 nautical miles (740 km; 460 mi) farther than the competing Airbus A319neo with 7% lower operating costs per seat. On August 3, 2026, the FAA certified the 737 MAX 7.

==== 737 MAX 8 ====
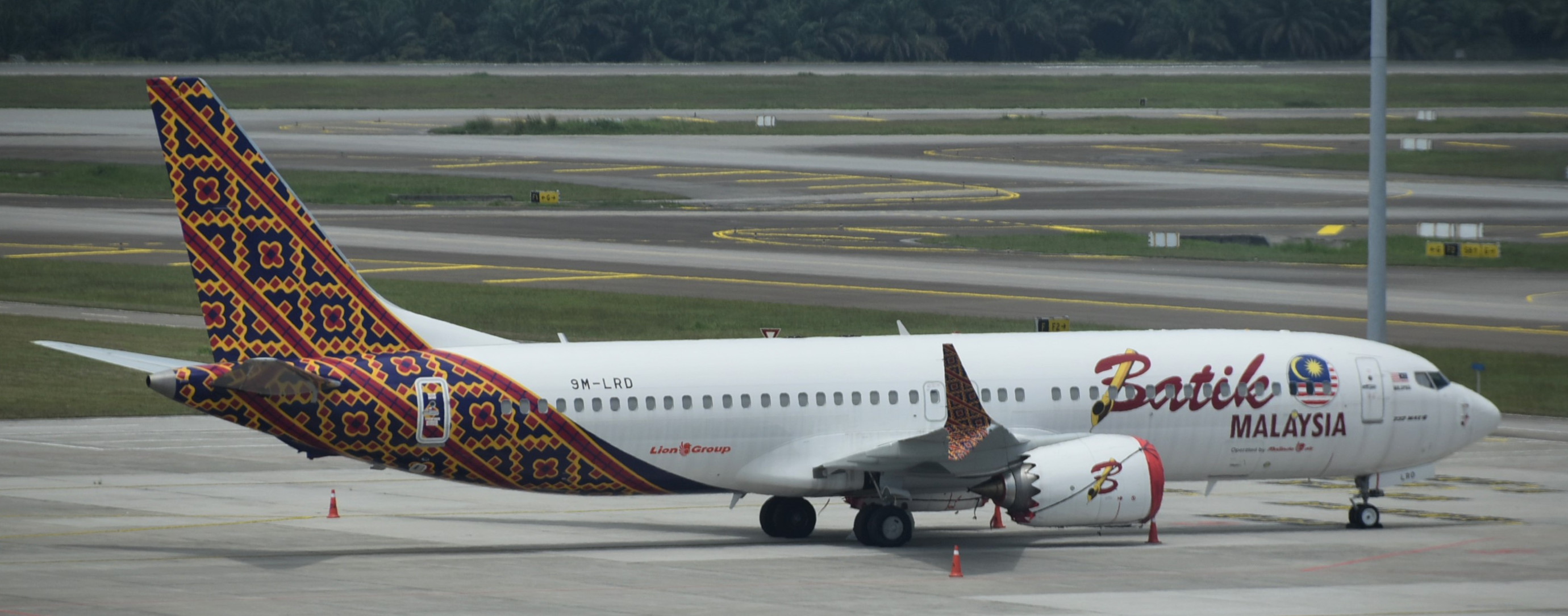
737 MAX 8 of Malindo Air (wearing Batik Air Malaysia livery), the launch customer

The 737 MAX 8, the first variant of the 737 MAX, has a longer fuselage than the MAX 7. On July 23, 2013, Boeing completed the firm configuration for the 737 MAX 8. Its first commercial flight was operated by Malindo Air on May 22, 2017. The MAX 8 replaced the 737-800 and competed with the A320neo.

The 737 MAX 200, a high-density version of the 737 MAX 8, was launched in September 2014 and named for seating for up to 200 passengers in a single-class layout with slimline seats requiring an extra pair of exit doors. The MAX 200 would be 20% more cost-efficient per seat, including 5% lower operating costs than the MAX 8 and would be the most efficient narrow-body on the market when entering service. In mid-November 2018, the first MAX 200 of the 135 ordered by Ryanair rolled out, in a 197-seat configuration. It was first flown from Renton on January 13, 2019, and was due to enter service in April 2019.

==== 737 MAX 9 ====
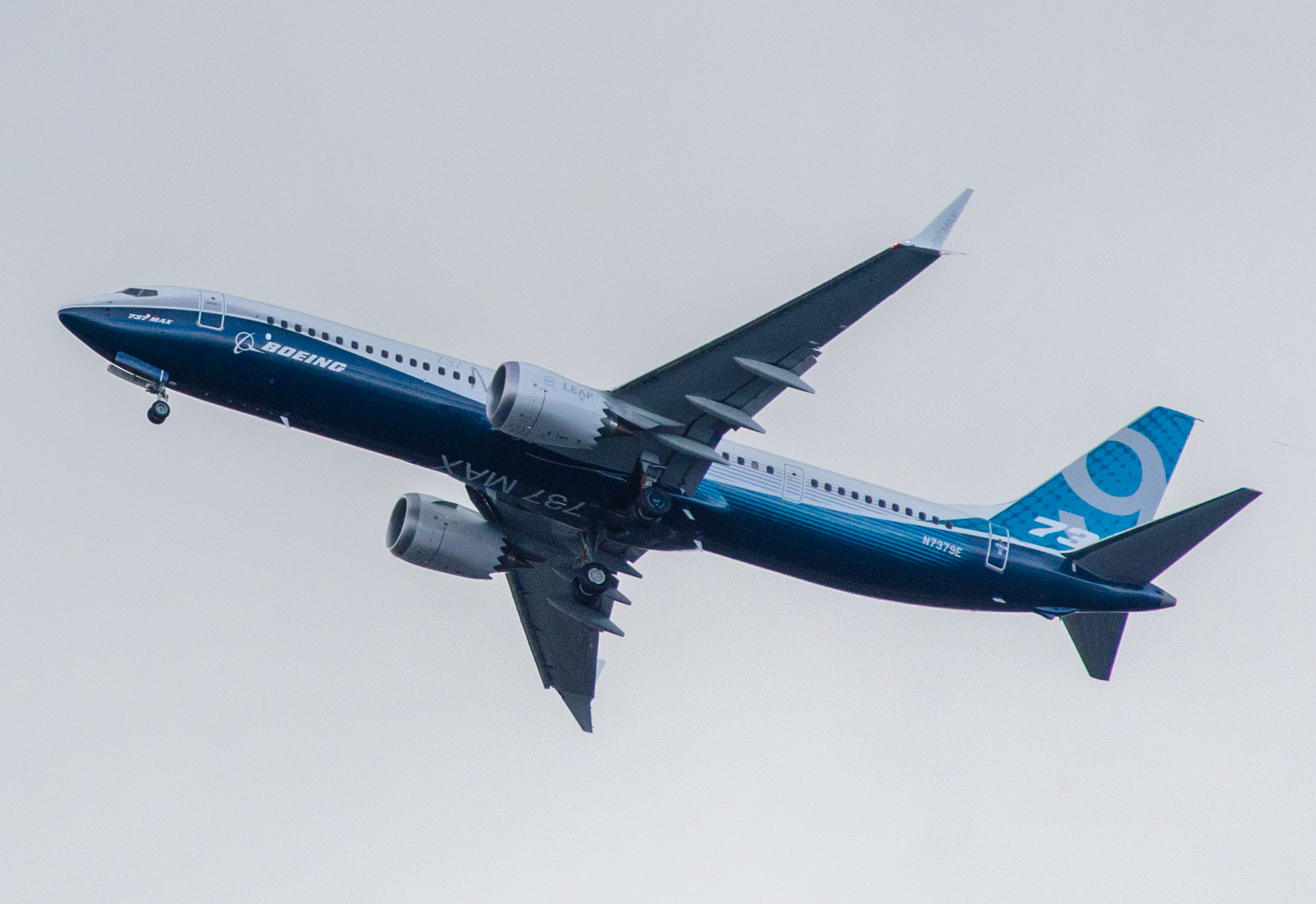
737 MAX 9 first flight on April 13, 2017

The 737 MAX 9, the stretched variant of the MAX 8, was launched with an order of 201 aircraft in February 2012. It made its roll-out on March 7, 2017, and first flight on April 13, 2017; It was certified by February 2018. The launch customer, Lion Air Group, took the first MAX 9 on March 21, 2018, before entering service with Thai Lion Air. The 737 MAX 9 replaced the 737-900 and competes with the Airbus A321neo.

==== 737 MAX 10 ====
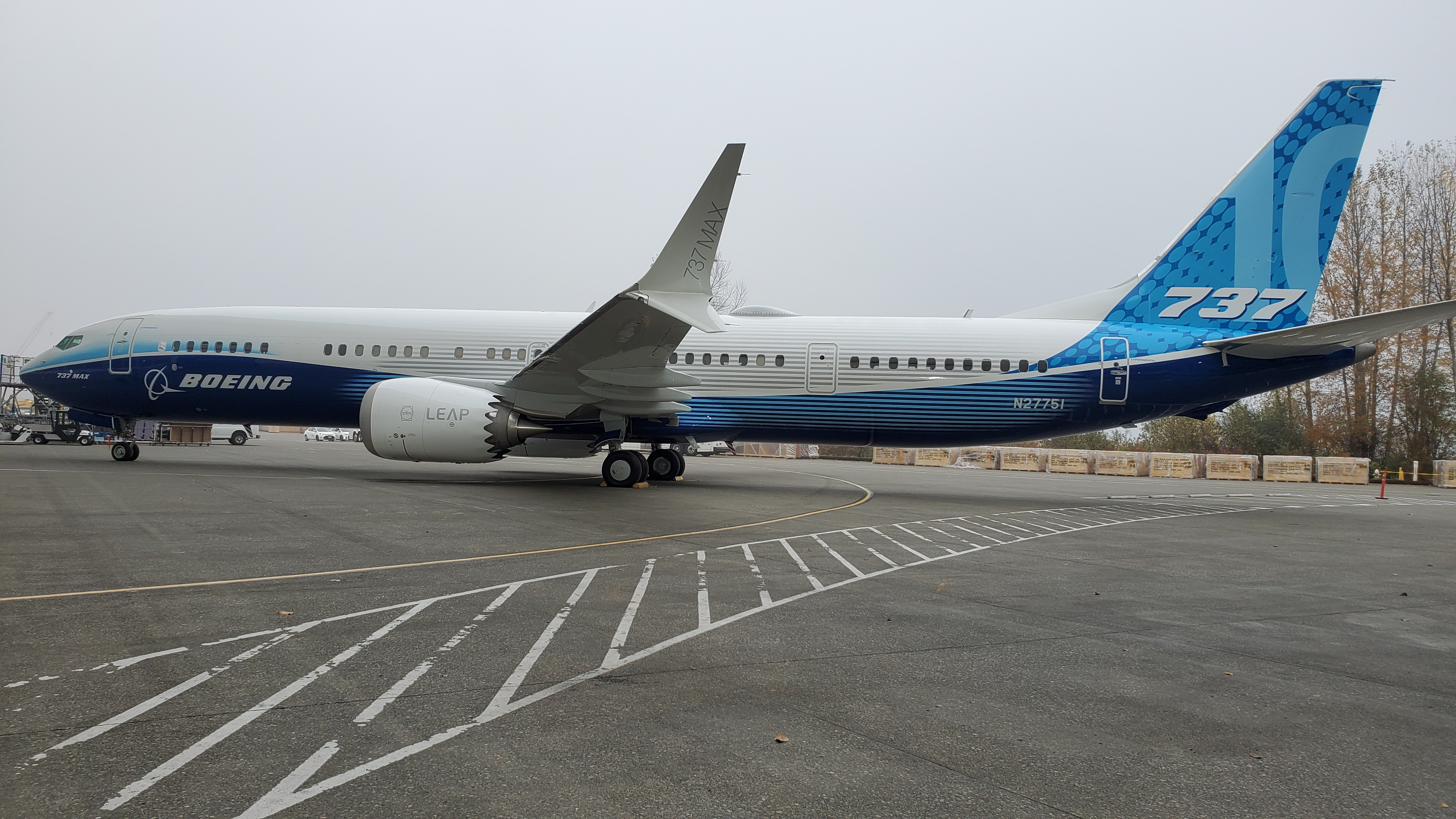
737 MAX 10 prototype during its roll-out ceremony

The 737 MAX 10 was proposed as a stretched MAX 9 in mid-2016, enabling seating for 230 in a single class or 189 in two-class layout, compared to 193 in two-class seating for the A321neo. The modest 66-inch (1.7 m) stretch of fuselage enables the MAX 10 to retain the existing wing and CFM Leap 1B engine from the MAX 9 with a trailing-link main landing gear as the only major change. The MAX 10 was launched on June 19, 2017, with 240 orders and commitments from more than ten customers. The variant configuration with a predicted 5% lower trip cost and seat cost compared to the A321neo was firmed up by February 2018, and by mid-2018, the critical design review was completed. The MAX 10 has a similar capacity to the A321XLR, but shorter range and much poorer field performance in smaller airports. It was unveiled in Boeing's Renton factory on November 22, 2019, and first flew on June 18, 2021. The MAX 10 was certified on October 20, 2026.

In the late 2010s, Boeing worked on a medium-range Boeing New Midsize Airplane (NMA) with two variants seating 225 or 275 passengers and targeting the same market segment as the 737 MAX 10 and the Airbus A321neo. A Future Small Airplane (FSA) was also touted during this period. The NMA project was set aside in January 2020, as Boeing focused on returning the 737 MAX to service and announced that it would be taking a new approach to future projects.

== Design ==
The 737 continued to evolve into many variants but still remains recognizable as the 737. These are divided into four generations but all are based on the same basic design.

=== Airframe ===
The fuselage cross section and nose are derived from that of the Boeing 707 and Boeing 727. Early 737 cockpits also inherited the "eyebrow windows" positioned above the main glareshield, which were a feature of the original 707 and 727 to allow for better crew visibility. Contrary to popular belief, these windows were not intended for celestial navigation (only the military T-43A had a sextant port for star navigation, which the civilian models lacked.) With modern avionics, the windows became redundant, and many pilots placed newspapers or other objects in them to block out sun glare. They were eliminated from the 737 cockpit design in 2004, although they are still installed on customer request. The eyebrow windows were sometimes removed and plugged, usually during maintenance overhauls, and can be distinguished by the metal plug which differs from the smooth metal in later aircraft that were not originally fitted with the windows.

The 737 was designed to sit relatively low to the ground to accommodate the design of smaller airports in the late 1960s which often lacked jetbridges or motorized belt loaders. The low fuselage allowed passengers to easily board from a mobile stairway or airstairs (which are still available as an option on the 737 MAX) and for luggage to be hand-lifted into the cargo holds. However, the design has proved to be an issue as the 737 has been modernized with larger and more fuel efficient engines.

The 737's main landing gear, under the wings at mid-cabin, rotates into wheel wells in the aircraft's belly. The legs are covered by partial doors, and "brush-like" seals aerodynamically smooth (or "fair") the wheels in the wells. The sides of the tires are exposed to the air in flight. "Hub caps" complete the aerodynamic profile of the wheels. It is forbidden to operate without the caps, because they are linked to the ground speed sensor that interfaces with the anti-skid brake system. The dark circles of the tires are clearly visible when a 737 takes off, or is at low altitude.

From July 2008, the steel landing gear brakes on new NGs were replaced by Messier-Bugatti carbon brakes, achieving weight savings to 550–700 pounds (250–320 kg) depending on whether standard or high-capacity brakes were equipped. On a 737-800 this gives a 0.5% improvement in fuel efficiency.

737s are not equipped with fuel dump systems. The original design was too small to require this, and adding a fuel dump system to the later, larger variants would have incurred a large weight penalty. Boeing instead demonstrated an "equivalent level of safety". Depending on the nature of the emergency, 737s either circle to burn off fuel or land overweight. If the latter is the case, the aircraft must be inspected by maintenance personnel for damage before being returned to service.

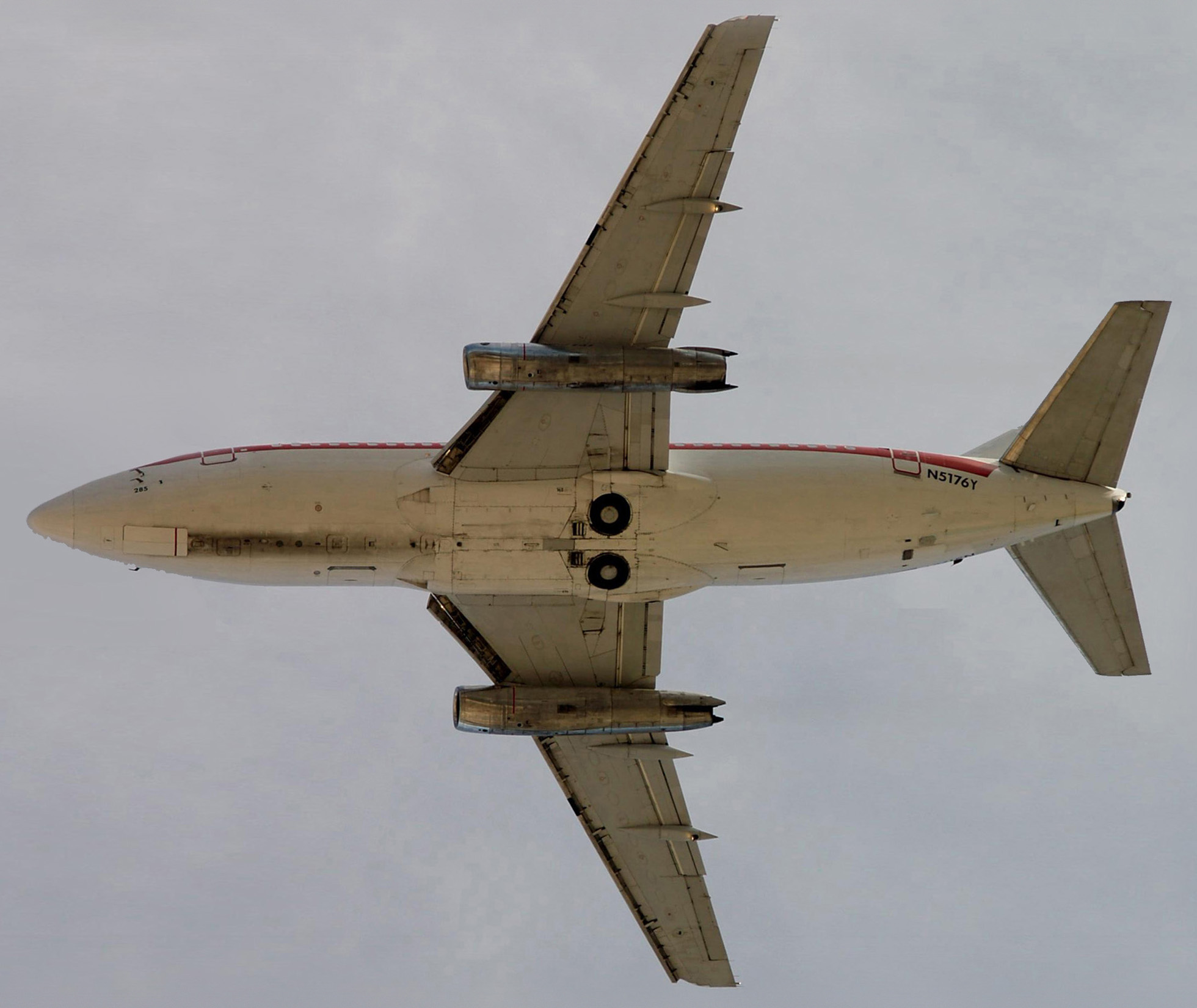
Original 737 with JT8D engines that span the entire wing chord

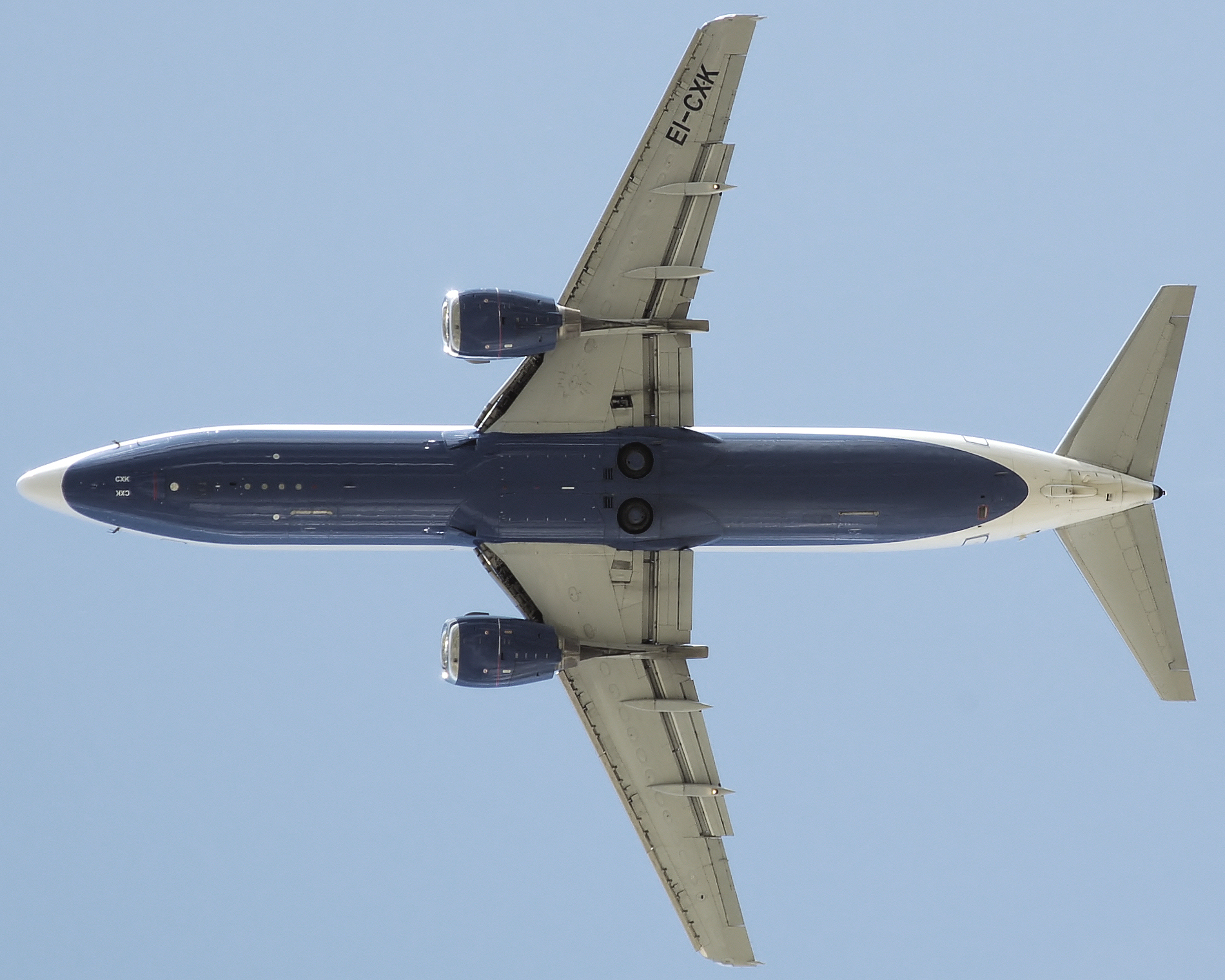
737 Classic with larger CFM56 engines mounted mostly ahead of the wing

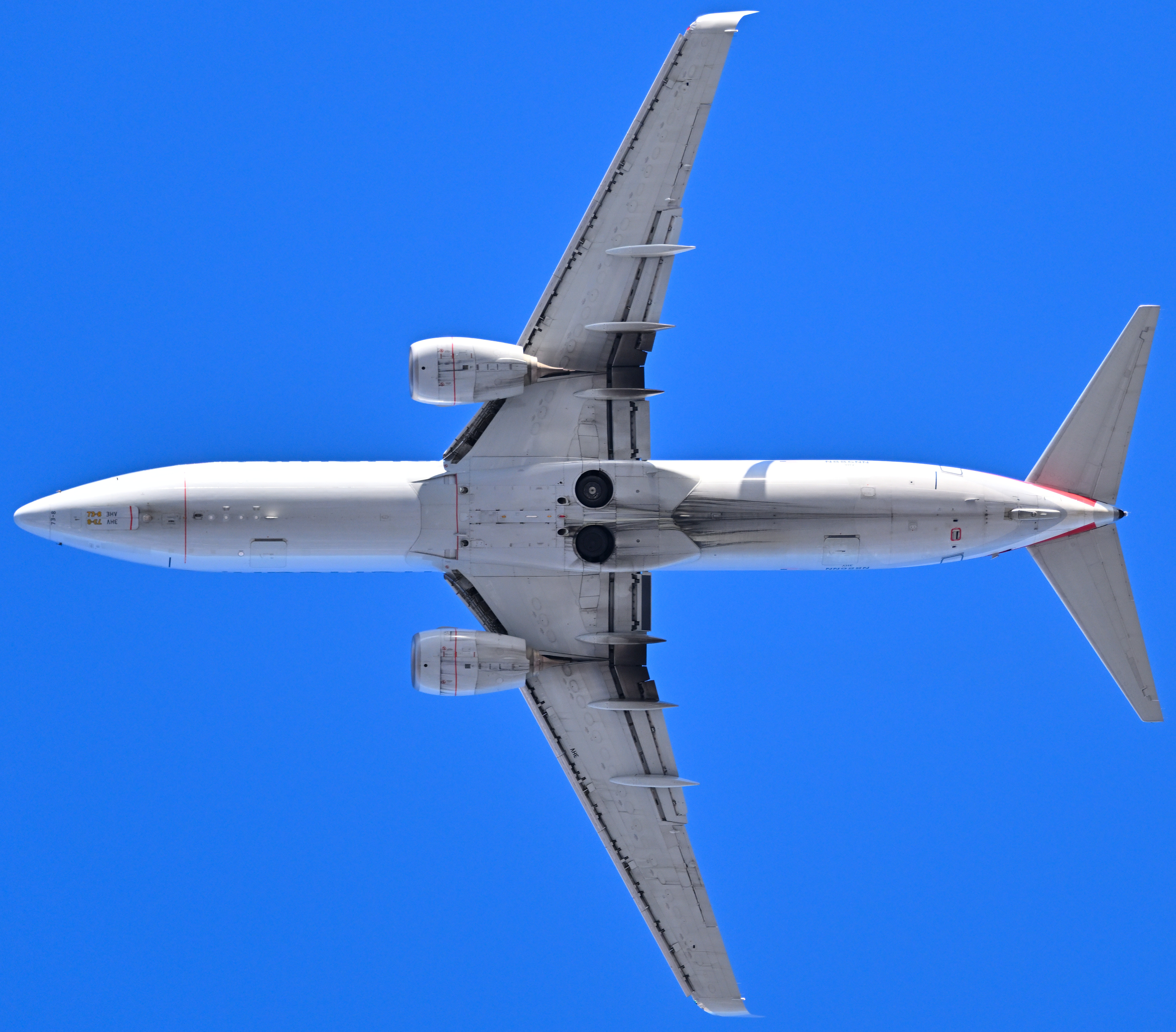
737 Next Generation with improved CFM56-7 engines and redesigned wing

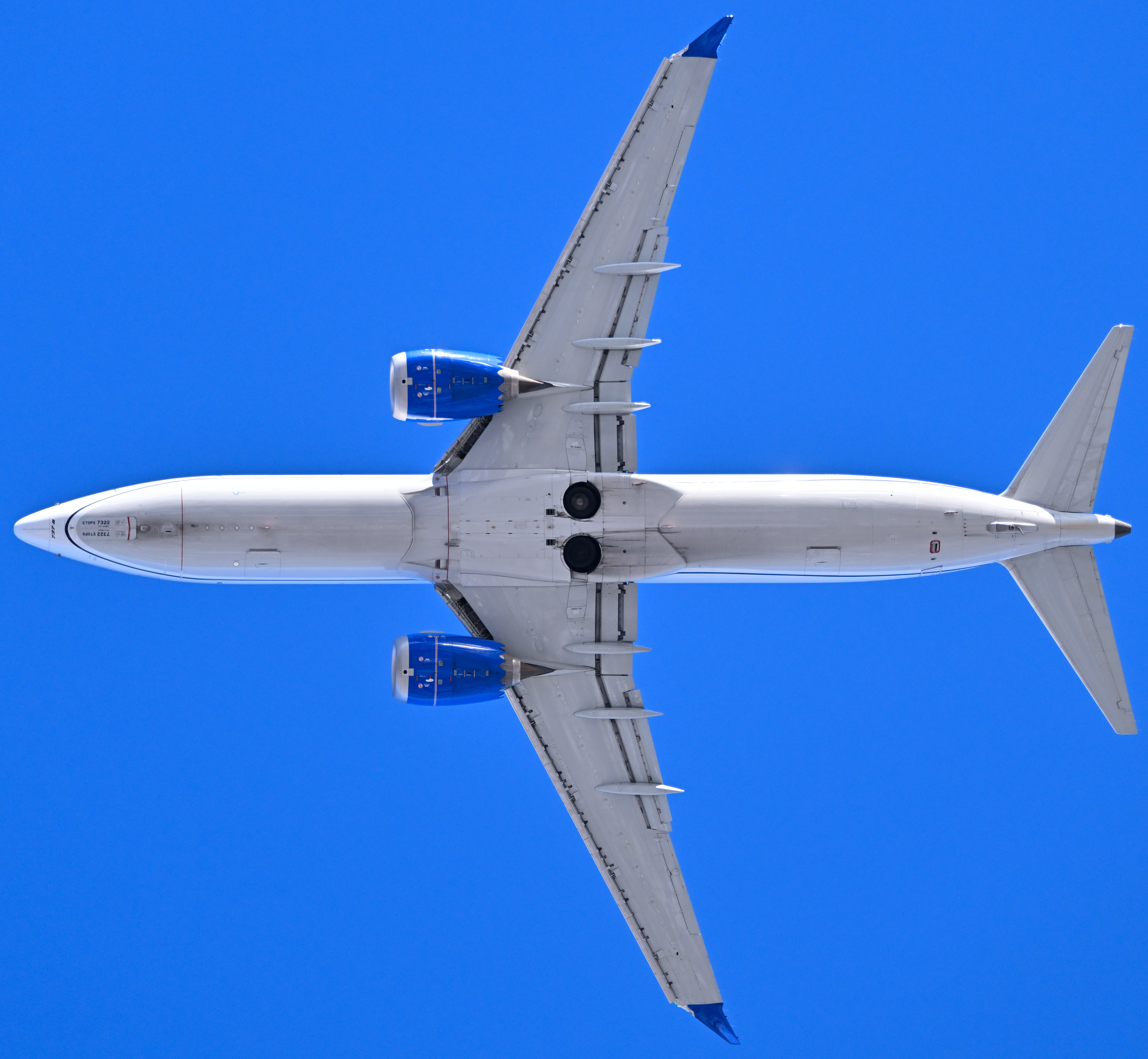
737 MAX with larger CFM LEAP engines, mounted even further ahead of the wing

=== Cabin ===
The first generation Original series 737 cabin was replaced for the second generation Classic series with a design based on the Boeing 757 cabin. The Classic cabin was then redesigned once more for the third, Next Generation, 737 with a design based on the Boeing 777 cabin. Boeing later offered the redesigned Sky Interior on the NG. The principal features of the Sky Interior include sculpted sidewalls, redesigned window housings, increased headroom and LED mood lighting, larger pivot-bins based on the 777 and 787 designs and generally more luggage space, and claims to have improved cabin noise levels by 2–4 dB. The first 737 equipped Boeing Sky Interior was delivered to Flydubai in late 2010. Continental Airlines, Alaska Airlines, Malaysia Airlines, and TUIFly have also received Sky Interior-equipped 737s. The 737 MAX continues to use the Boeing Sky Interior.

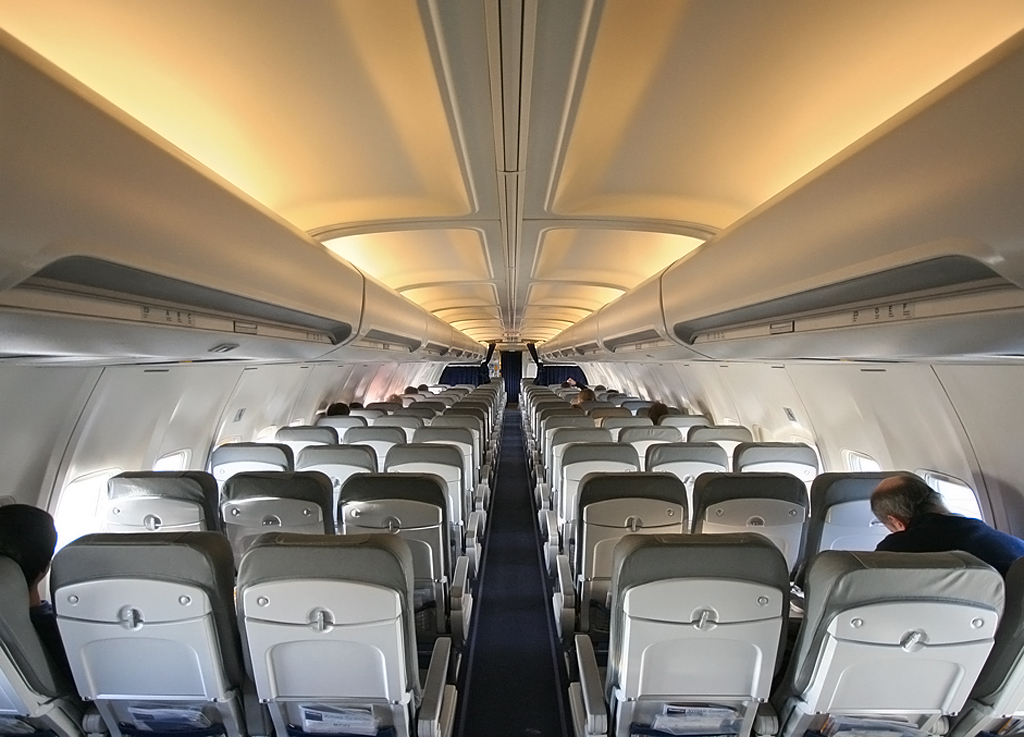
737 Classic interior

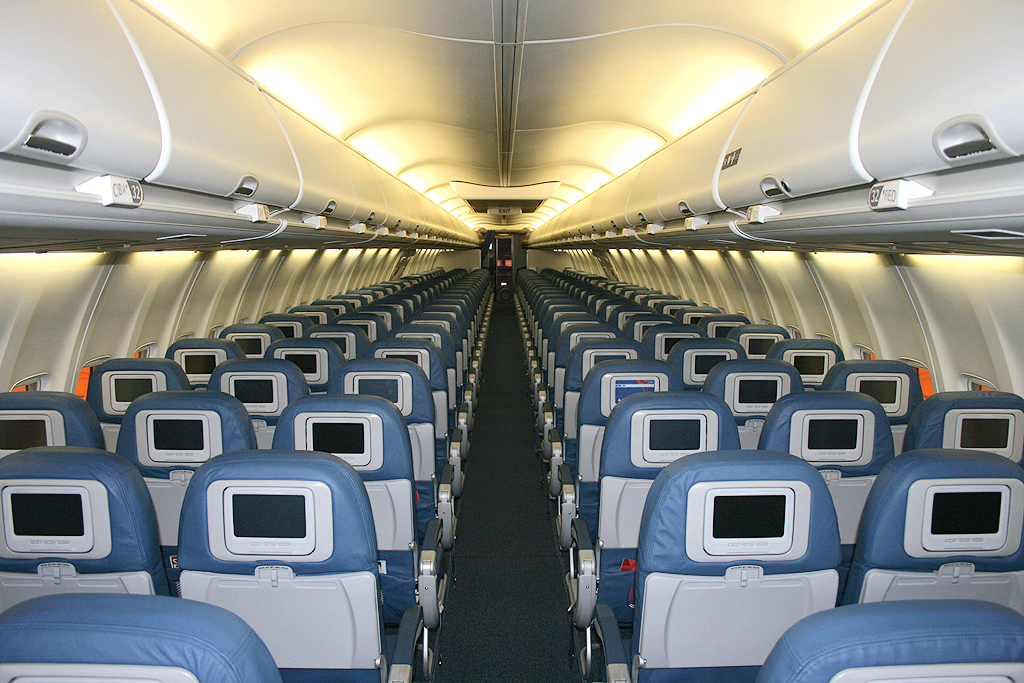
737 Next Generation standard interior

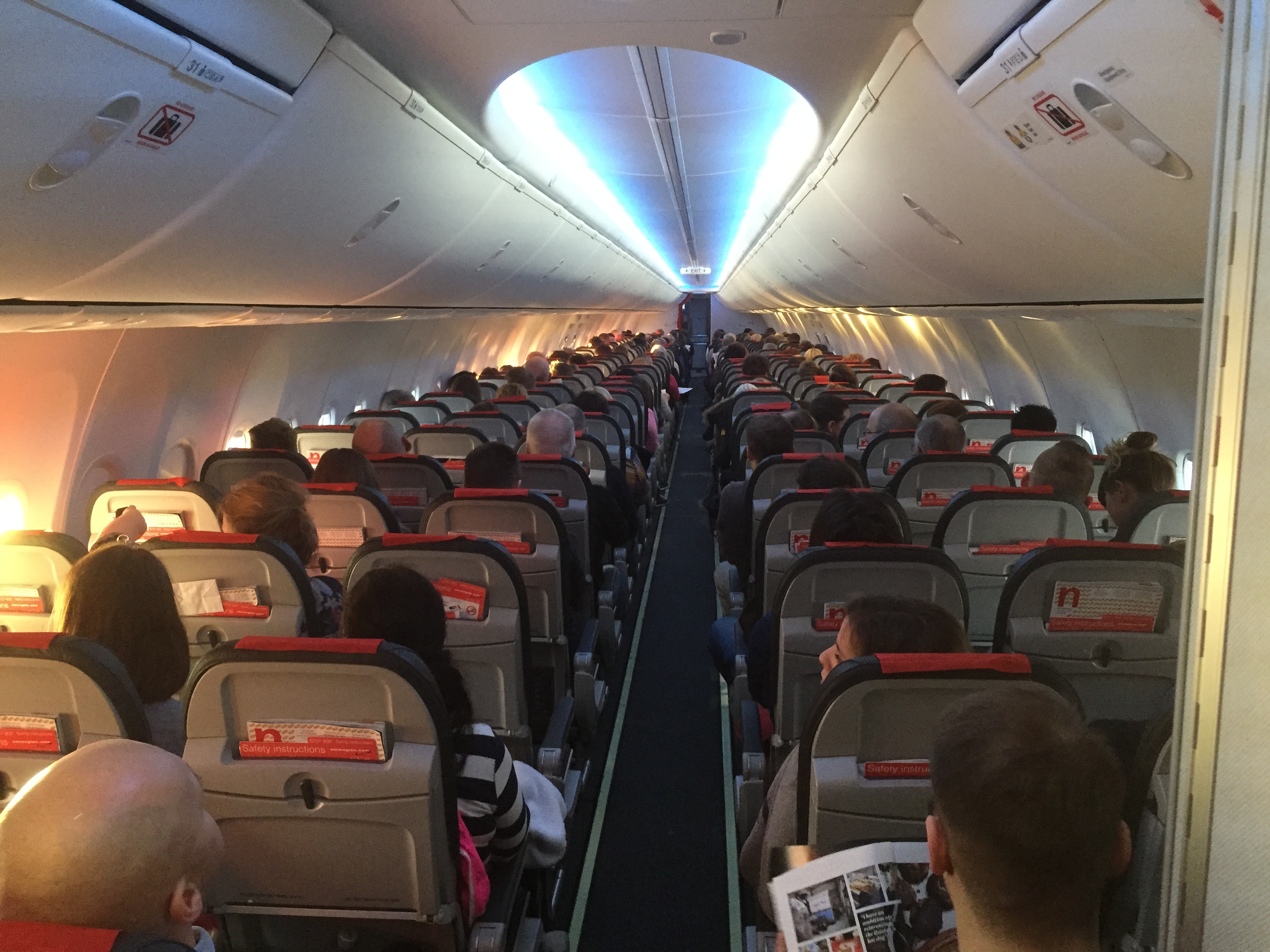
737 Next Generation Sky Interior with pivot bins and LED lighting

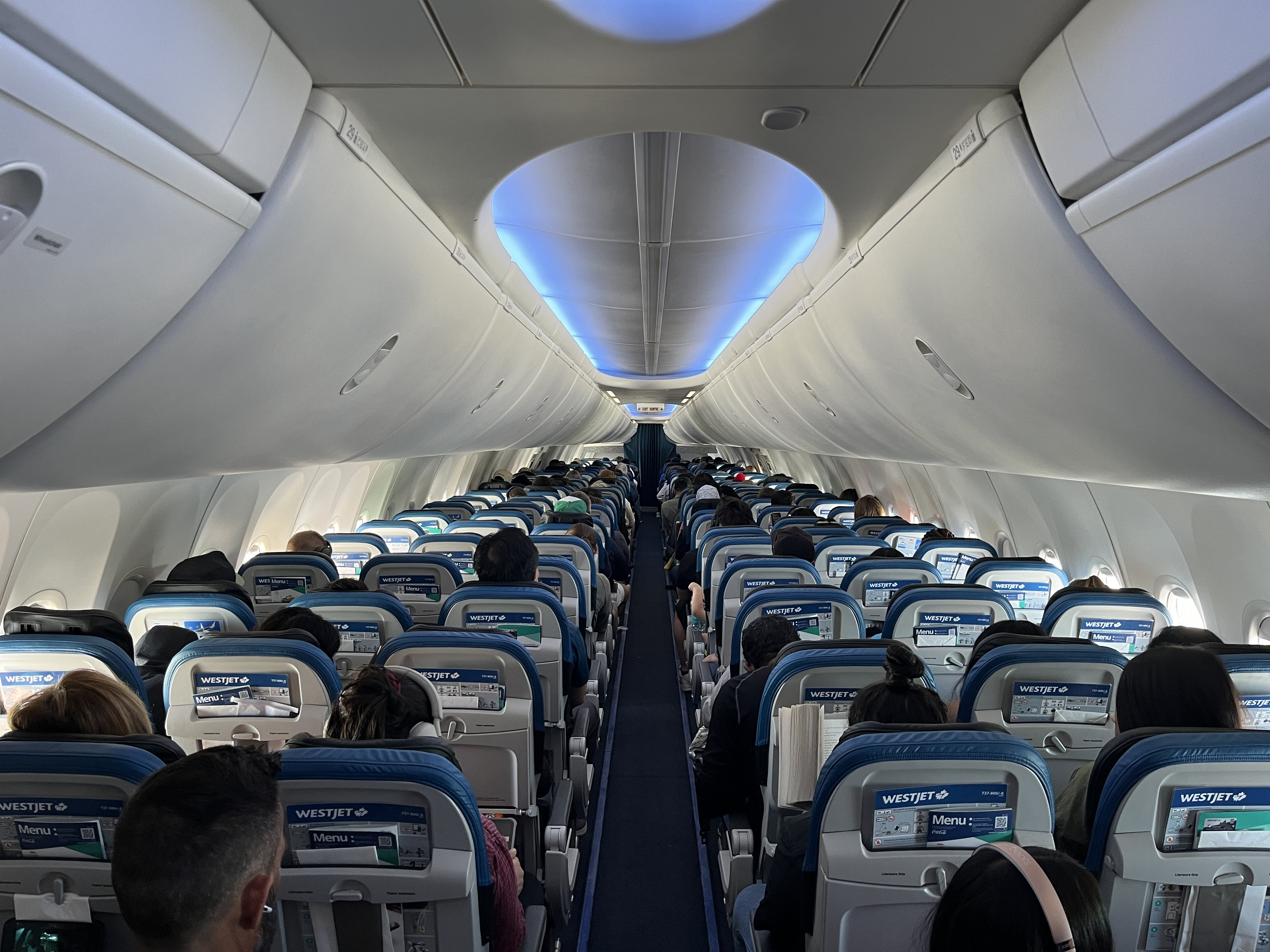
737 MAX Sky Interior

=== Cockpit ===
The 737 uses a hydro-mechanical flight control system, similar to the Boeing 707 and typical of the period in which the 737 was originally designed. Pilot commands are transmitted to hydraulic boosters attached to the control surfaces via steel cables that run through the fuselage and wings, rather than by the electrical fly-by-wire systems found in more recent designs like the Airbus A320 or Boeing 777.

The primary flight controls have mechanical backups. In the event of total hydraulic system failure or double engine failure, they will automatically revert to control via servo tab. In this mode, termed manual reversion, the servo tabs aerodynamically control the elevators and ailerons; these servo tabs are in turn controlled by cables running to the control yoke. The pilot's muscle forces alone control the tabs.

The 737 Next Generation series introduced a six-screen LCD glass cockpit with modern avionics but designed to retain crew commonality with previous 737 generations. The 737 MAX introduced a 4 15.1 inch landscape LCD screen cockpit manufactured by Rockwell Collins derived from the Boeing 787 Dreamliner. Except for the spoilers, which are fly-by-wire controlled, and all the analog instruments, which became digital, everything else is similar to the cockpits of the previous 737 generations to maintain commonality.

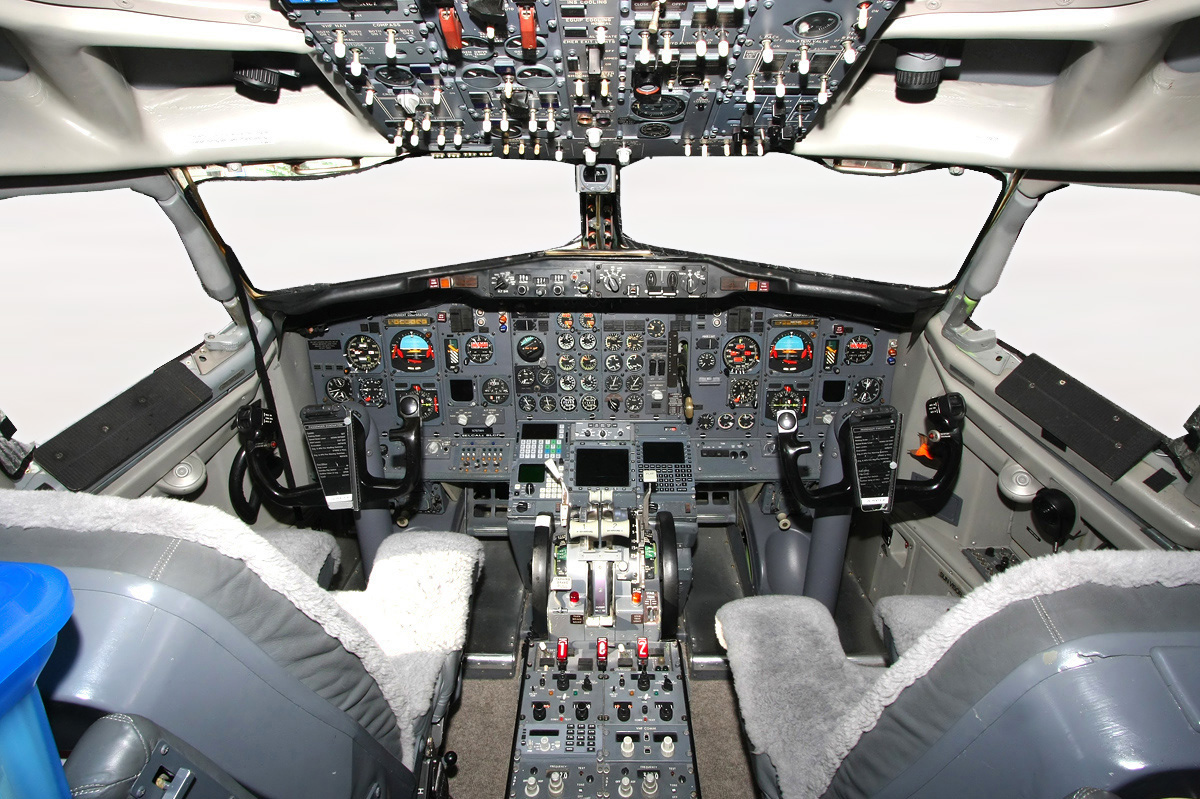
Original 737 cockpit

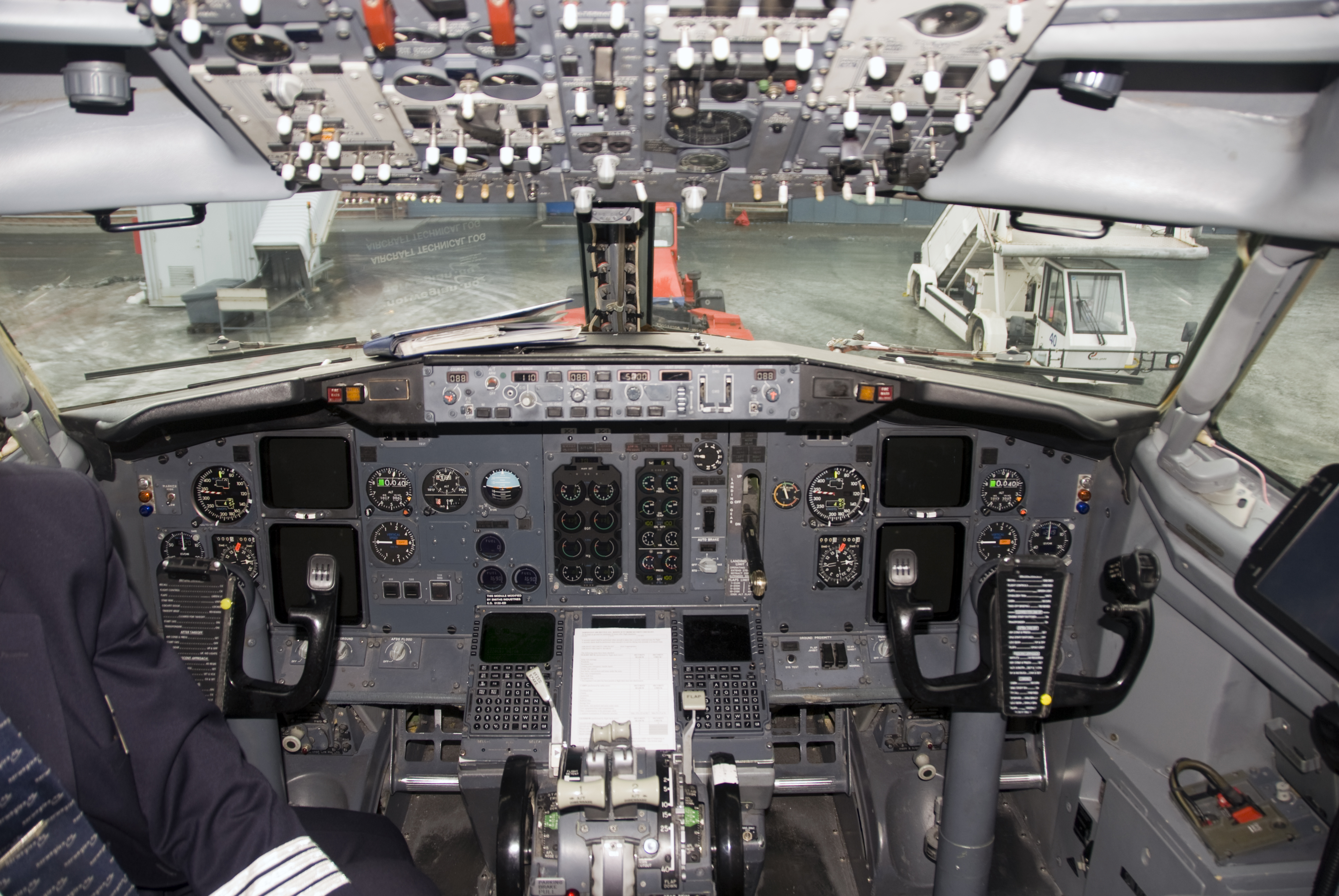
737 Classic cockpit

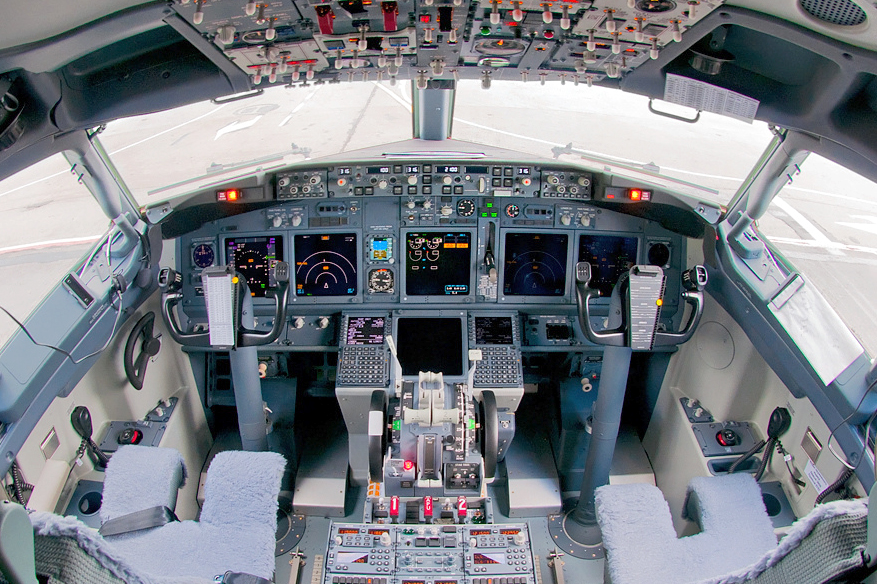
737 Next Generation cockpit

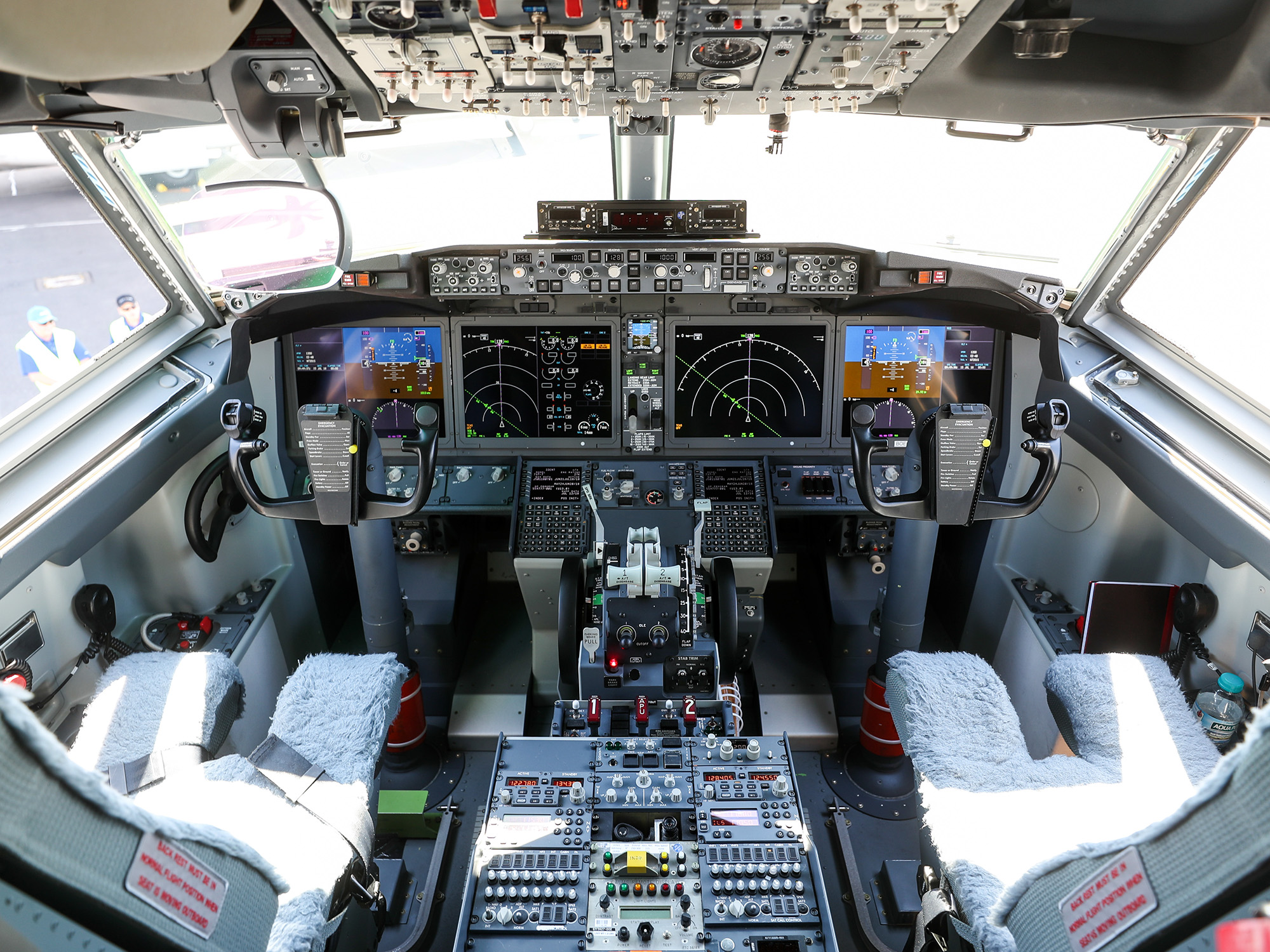
737 MAX cockpit

=== Engines ===
Engines on the 737 Classic series (-300, -400, -500) and Next-Generation series (-600, -700, -800, -900) do not have circular inlets like most aircraft but rather a planform on the lower side, which has been dictated largely by the need to accommodate ever larger engine diameters. The 737 Classic series featured CFM56 high bypass turbofan engines, which were 25% more efficient and also reduced noise significantly over JT8D low bypass engines used on the 737 Original series (-100 and -200), but also posed an engineering challenge given the low ground clearance of the Boeing 737 family. Boeing and engine supplier CFM International (CFMI) solved the problem by placing the engine ahead of (rather than below) the wing, and by moving engine accessories to the sides (rather than the bottom) of the engine pod, giving the 737 Classic and later generations a distinctive non-circular air intake.

The improved, higher pressure ratio CFM56-7 turbofan engine on the 737 Next Generation is 7% more fuel-efficient than the previous CFM56-3 on the 737 Classic with the same bypass ratio. The newest 737 variants, the 737 MAX series, feature LEAP-1B engines from CFMI with a 69 inches (1.76 m) fan diameter. These engines were expected to be 10-12% more efficient than the CFM56-7B engines on the 737 Next Generation series.

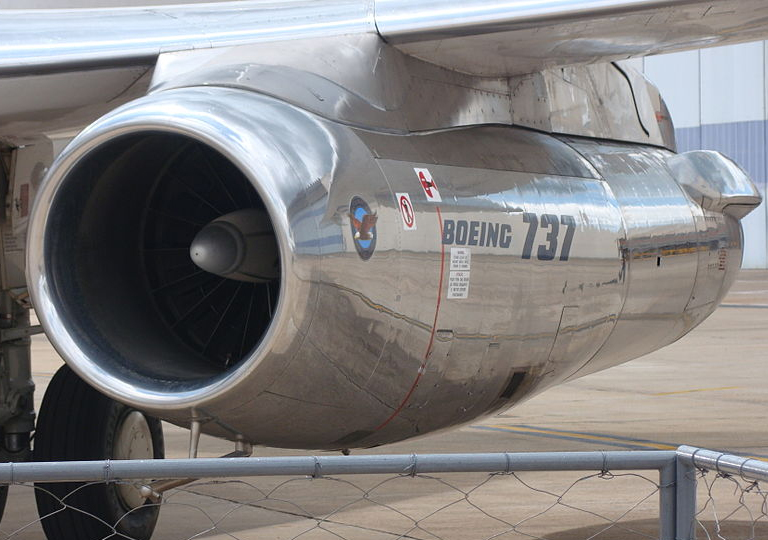
Original 737 with JT8D engine mounted under the wing with original cowling design

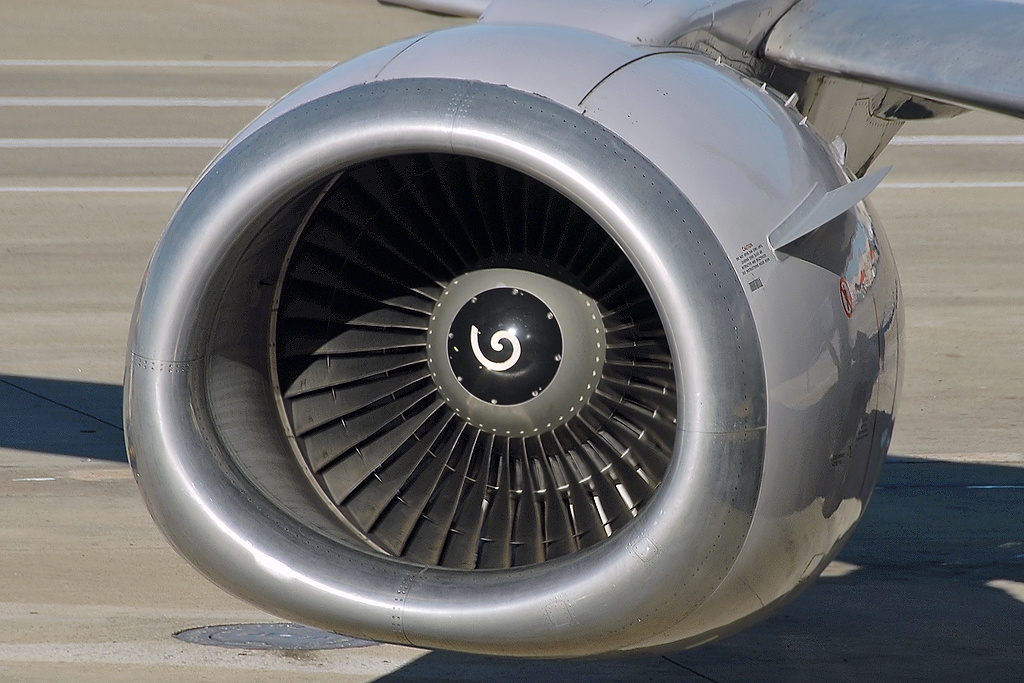
737 Classic with larger CFM56 engine mounted mostly ahead of the wing with an ovoid "hamster pouch" inlet with a flattened bottom

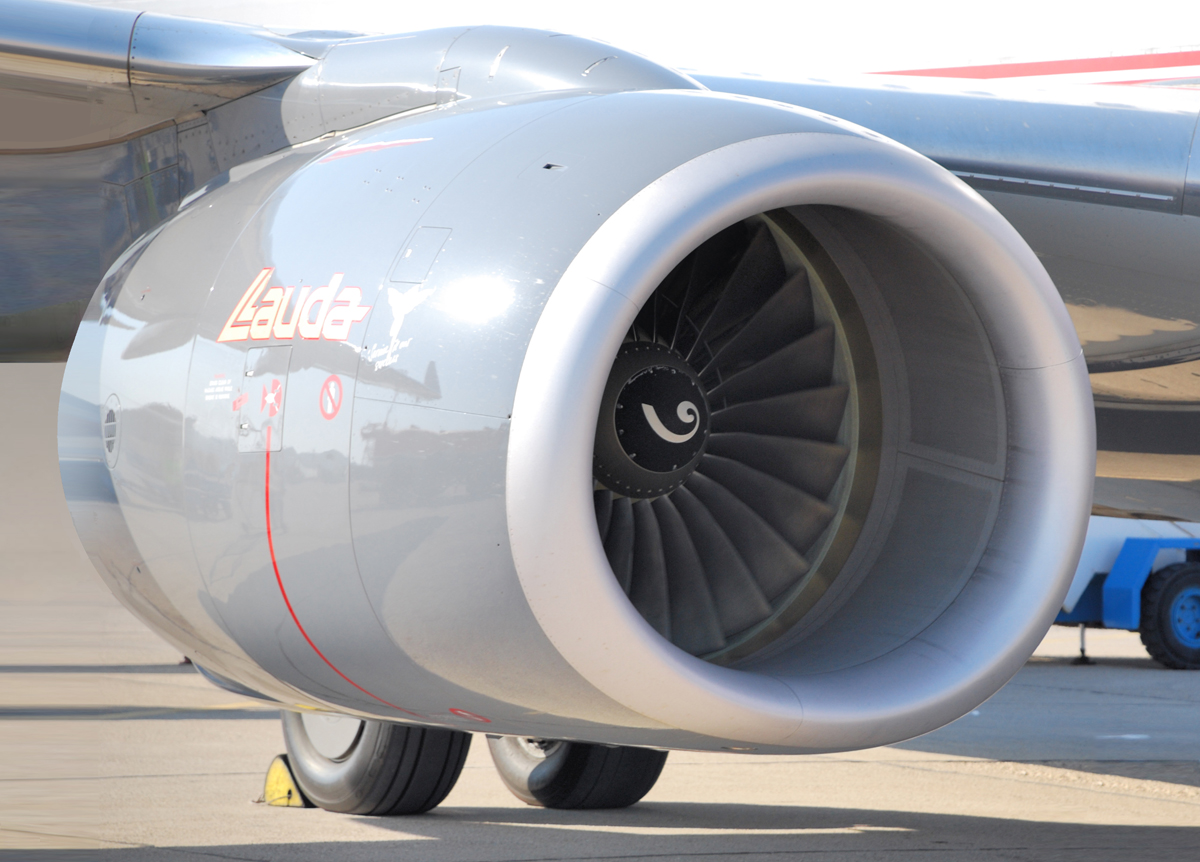
737 Next Generation with CFM56-7 engine with a more rounded inlet due to a redesigned fan in the engine

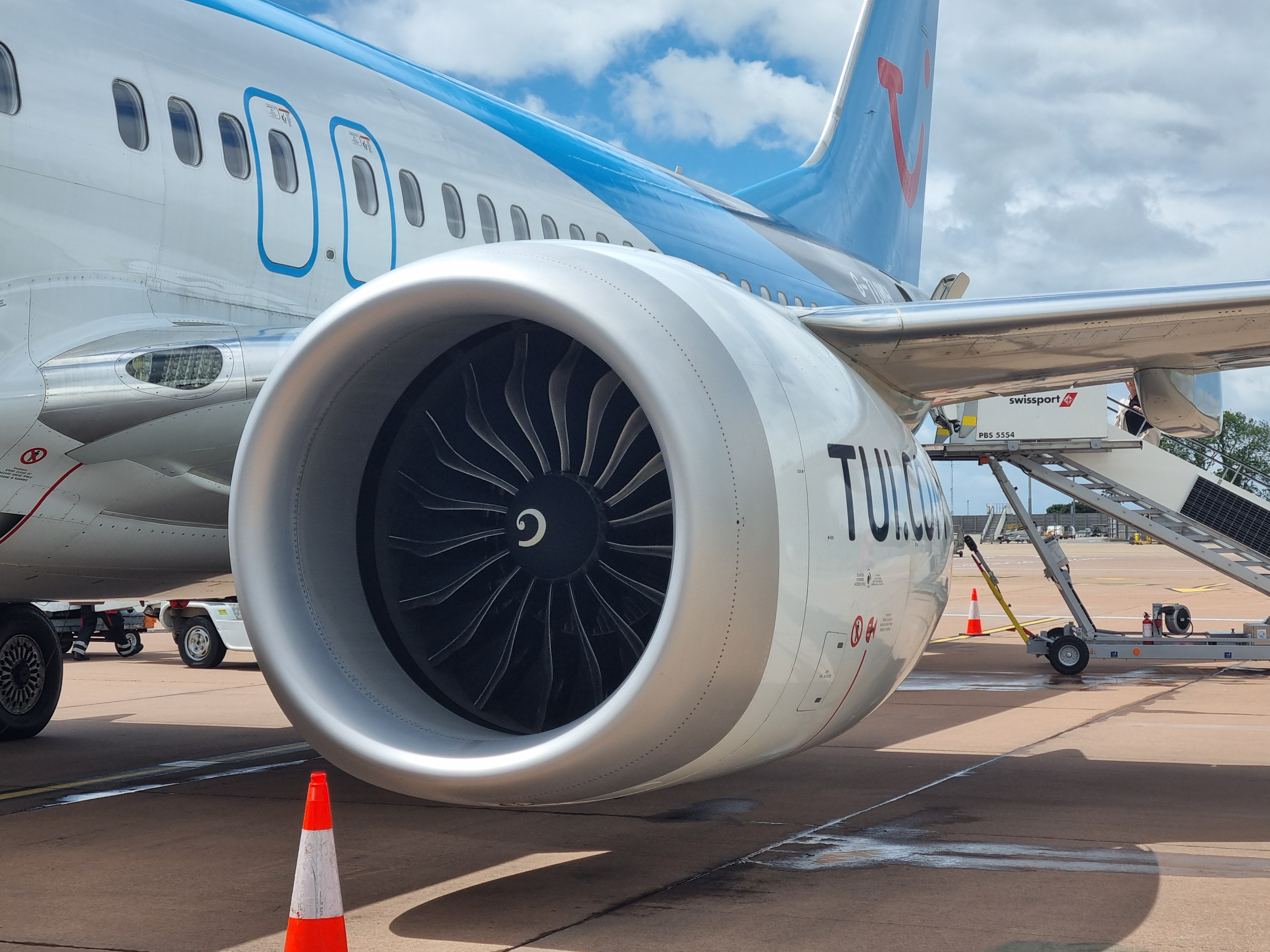
737 MAX with larger CFM LEAP engines, mounted even further ahead of the wing a nacelle with chevrons

=== Wingtips ===
The Original -100 and -200 series were built without wingtip devices, but these were later introduced to improve fuel efficiency. The 737 has evolved four winglet types: the 737-200 Mini-winglet, 737 Classic/NG Blended Winglet, 737 Split Scimitar Winglet, and 737 MAX Advanced Technology Winglet. The 737-200 Mini-winglets are part of the Quiet Wing Corp modification kit that received certification in 2005.

Blended winglets were standard on the 737 NG since 2000 and are available for retrofit on 737 Classic models. These winglets stand approximately 8 feet (2.4 m) tall and are installed at the wing tips. They improve fuel efficiency by up to 5% through lift-induced drag reduction achieved by moderating wingtip vortices.

Split Scimitar winglets became available in 2014 for the 737-800, 737-900ER, BBJ2 and BBJ3, and in 2015 for the 737-700, 737-900 and BBJ1. Split Scimitar winglets were developed by Aviation Partners, the same Seattle-based corporation that developed the blended winglets; the Split Scimitar winglets produce up to a 5.5% fuel savings per aircraft compared to 3.3% savings for the blended winglets. Southwest Airlines flew their first flight of a 737-800 with Split Scimitar winglets on April 14, 2014. The 737 MAX features an Advanced Technology (AT) winglet produced by Boeing that resembles a cross between the Blended winglet and the Split Scimitar winglet.

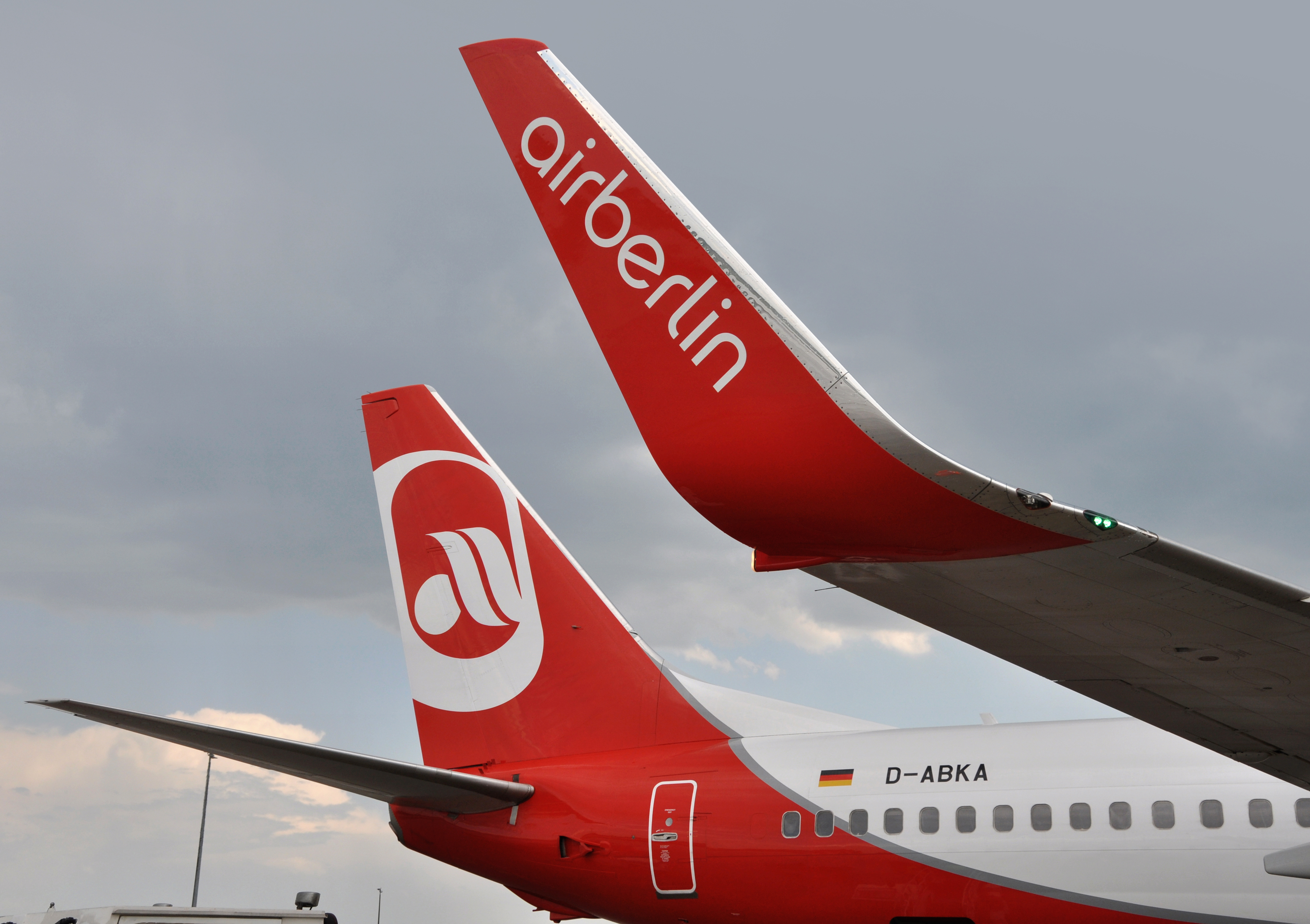
Blended Winglet, standard on 737 Next Generation, and a retrofit option for Classics

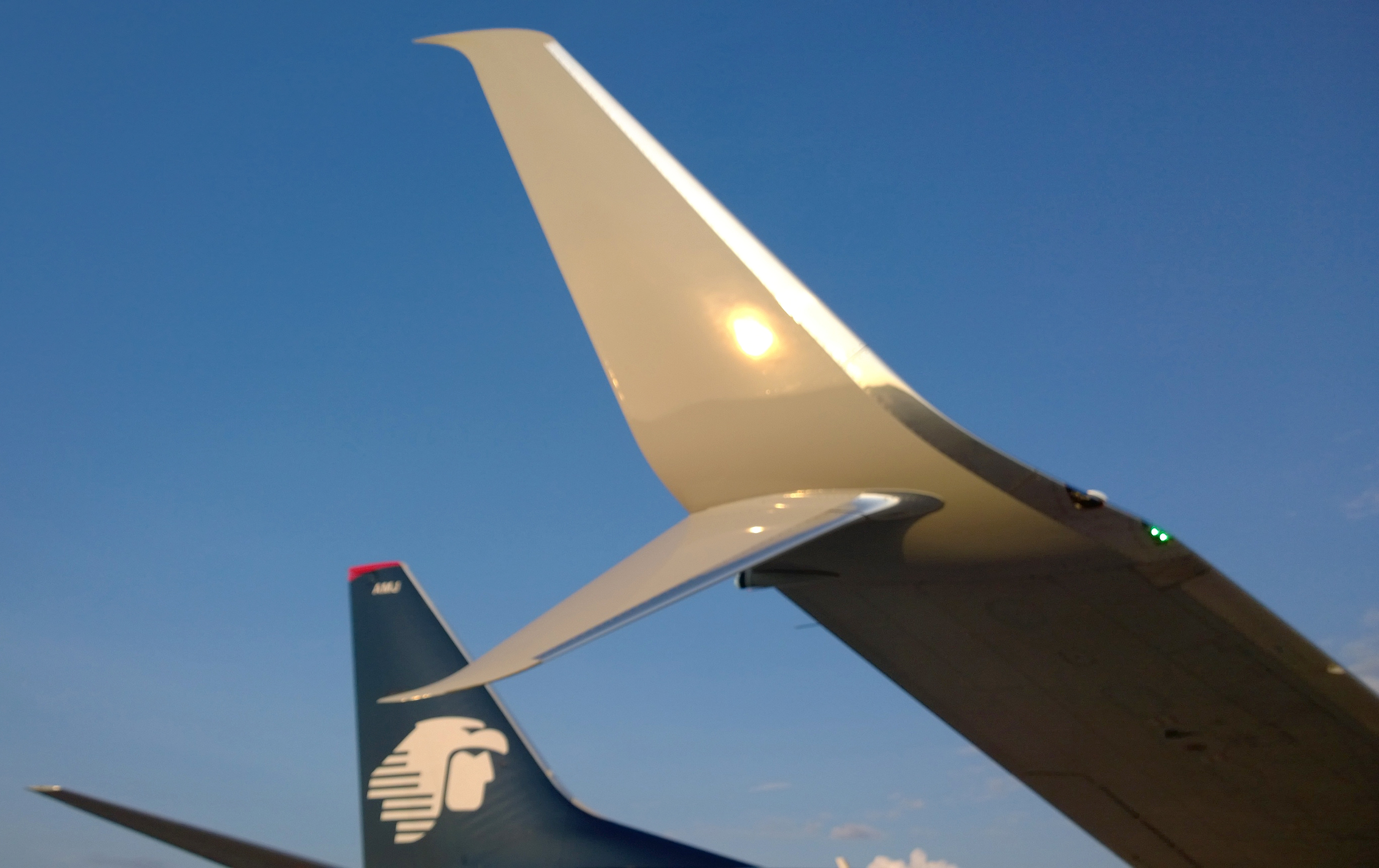
Split Scimitar Winglet standard on later 737 Next Generation models

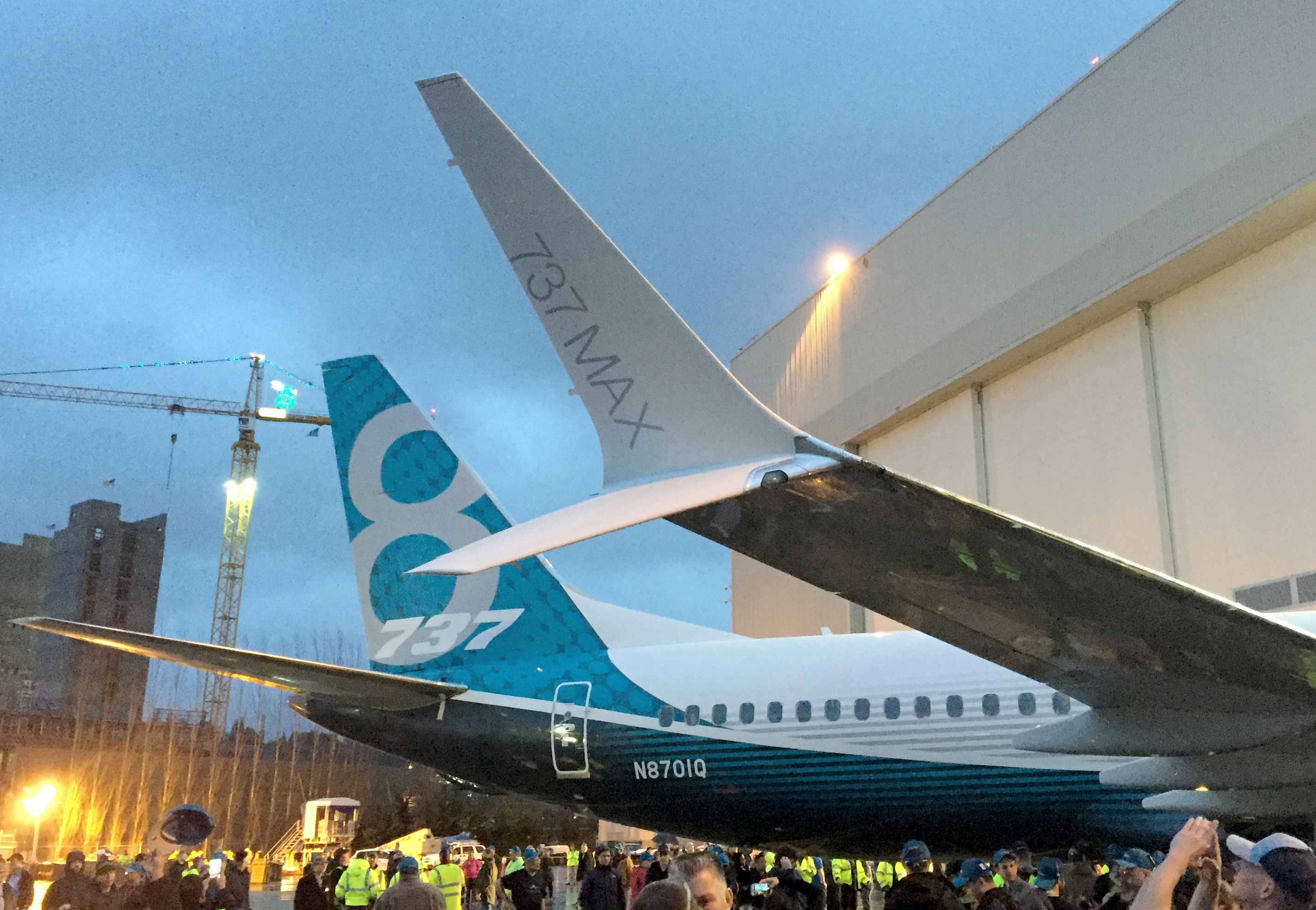
Advanced Technology Winglet standard on MAX

== Other variants ==
=== 737 AEW&C ===
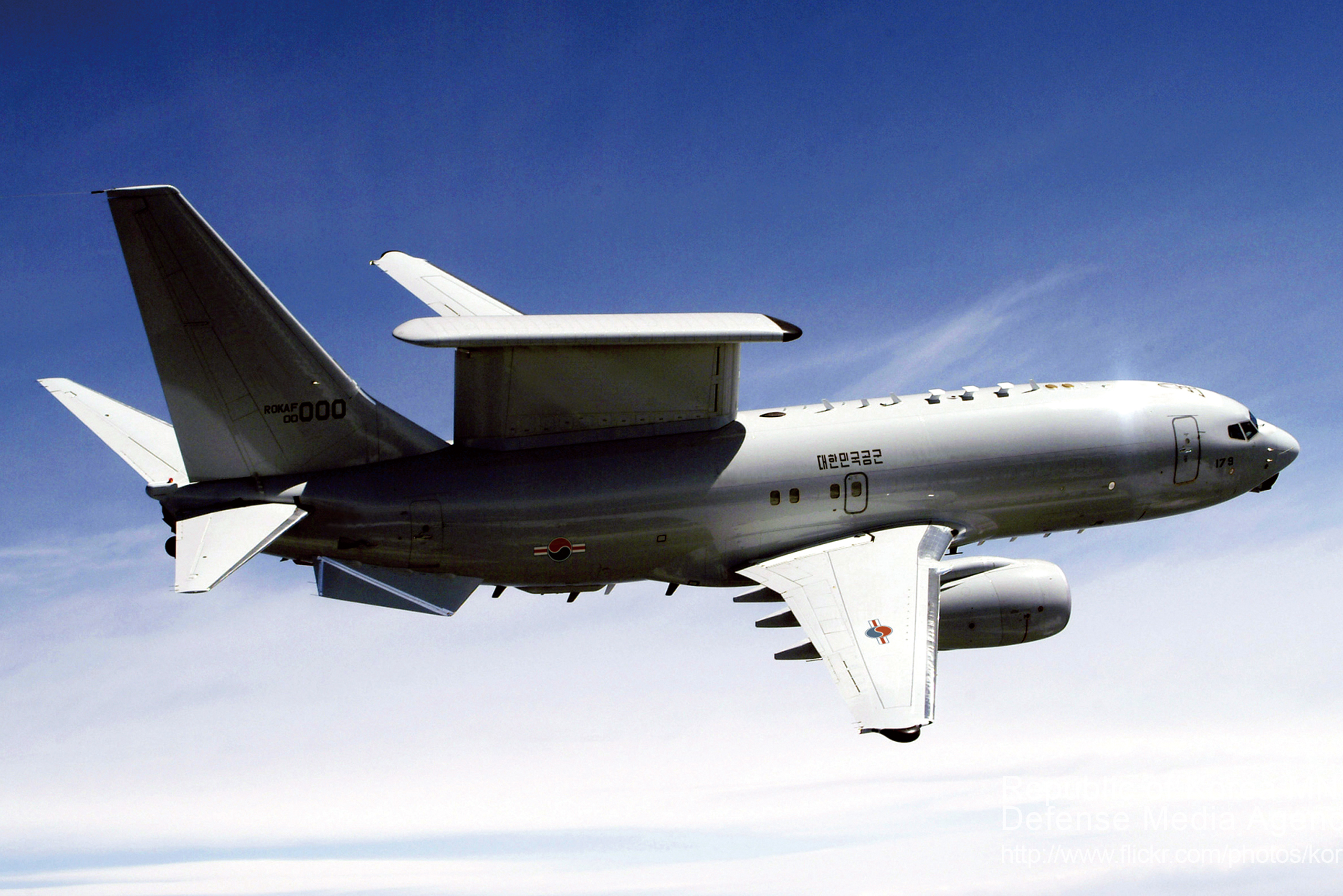
The Boeing 737 AEW&C is an Airborne Early Warning and Control version of the 737-700.

The Boeing 737 AEW&C, designated Boeing E-7 Wedgetail, is an Airborne Early Warning and Control (AEW&C) version of the 737-700IGW which is similar to the 737-700ER. The aircraft uses a Northrop Grumman Electronic Systems MESA (Multi-role Electronically Scanned Array) surveillance and early warning radar. This system, designed for minimal aerodynamic impact, is located on a dorsal fin at the top of the fuselage, hence its nickname "top hat". The Royal Australian Air Force was the first customer for the Project Wedgetail (6 aircraft), followed by the Turkish Air Force with the Project Peace Eagle (4 aircraft), and the Republic of Korea Air Force with the Project Peace Eye (4 aircraft).

=== T-43/CT-43A ===
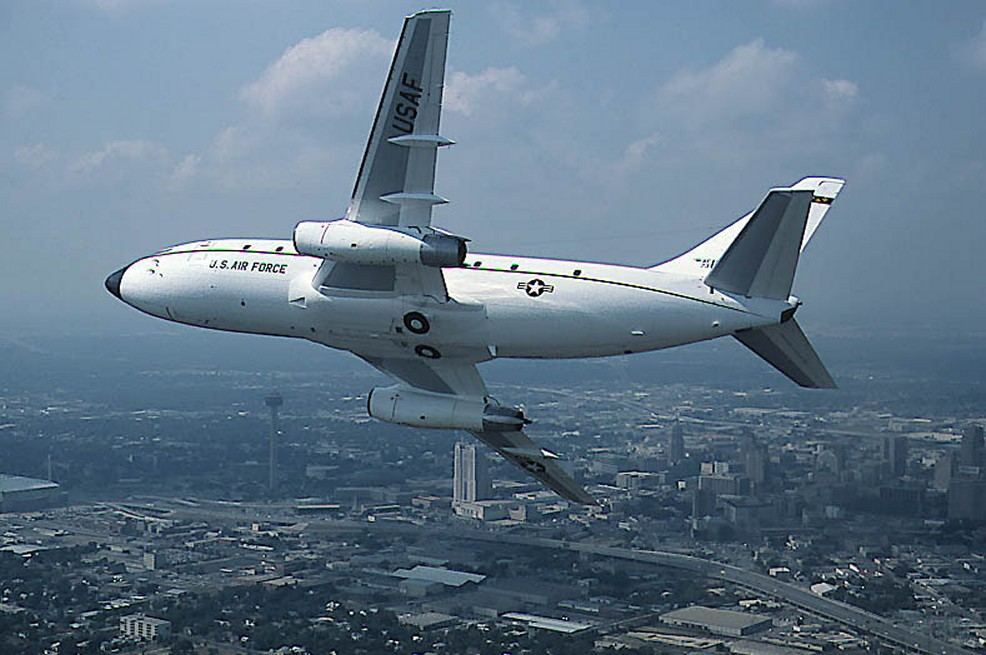
The T-43 was a 737-200 used by the United States Air Force to train navigators.

The T-43 was a 737-200 modified for use by the United States Air Force for training navigators, now known as USAF combat systems officers. Informally referred to as the Gator (an abbreviation of "navigator") and "Flying Classroom", nineteen of these aircraft were delivered to the Air Training Command at Mather AFB, California during 1973 and 1974. Two additional aircraft were delivered to the Colorado Air National Guard at Buckley ANGB (later Buckley AFB) and Peterson AFB, Colorado, in direct support of cadet air navigation training at the nearby U.S. Air Force Academy.

Two T-43s were later converted to CT-43As, similar to the CT-40A Clipper below, in the early 1990s and transferred to Air Mobility Command and United States Air Forces in Europe, respectively, as executive transports. A third aircraft was also transferred to Air Force Materiel Command for use as a radar test bed aircraft and was redesignated as an NT-43A. The T-43 was retired by the Air Education and Training Command in 2010 after 37 years of service.

=== Boeing 737-2X9 Surveiller ===
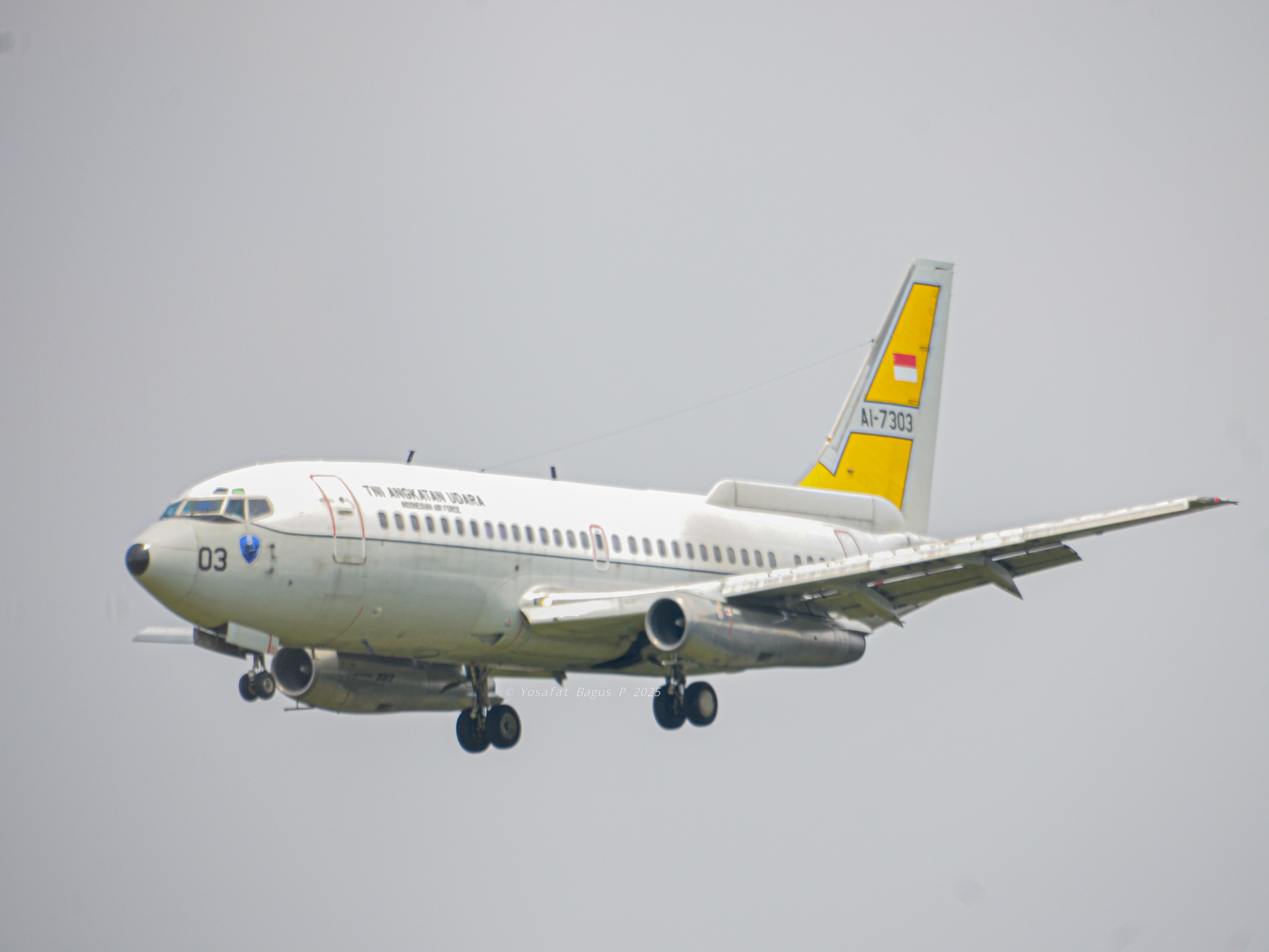
Indonesian Air Force Boeing 737-2X9 Surveiller MPA

The Indonesian Air Force ordered three modified 737-200s, designated Boeing 737-2X9 Surveiller. They were used as maritime patrol (MPA) and transport aircraft, fitted with Motorola SLAMMR (Side-Looking Airborne Multi-Mission Radar). The aircraft were delivered between May 1982 and October 1983.

=== C-40 Clipper ===
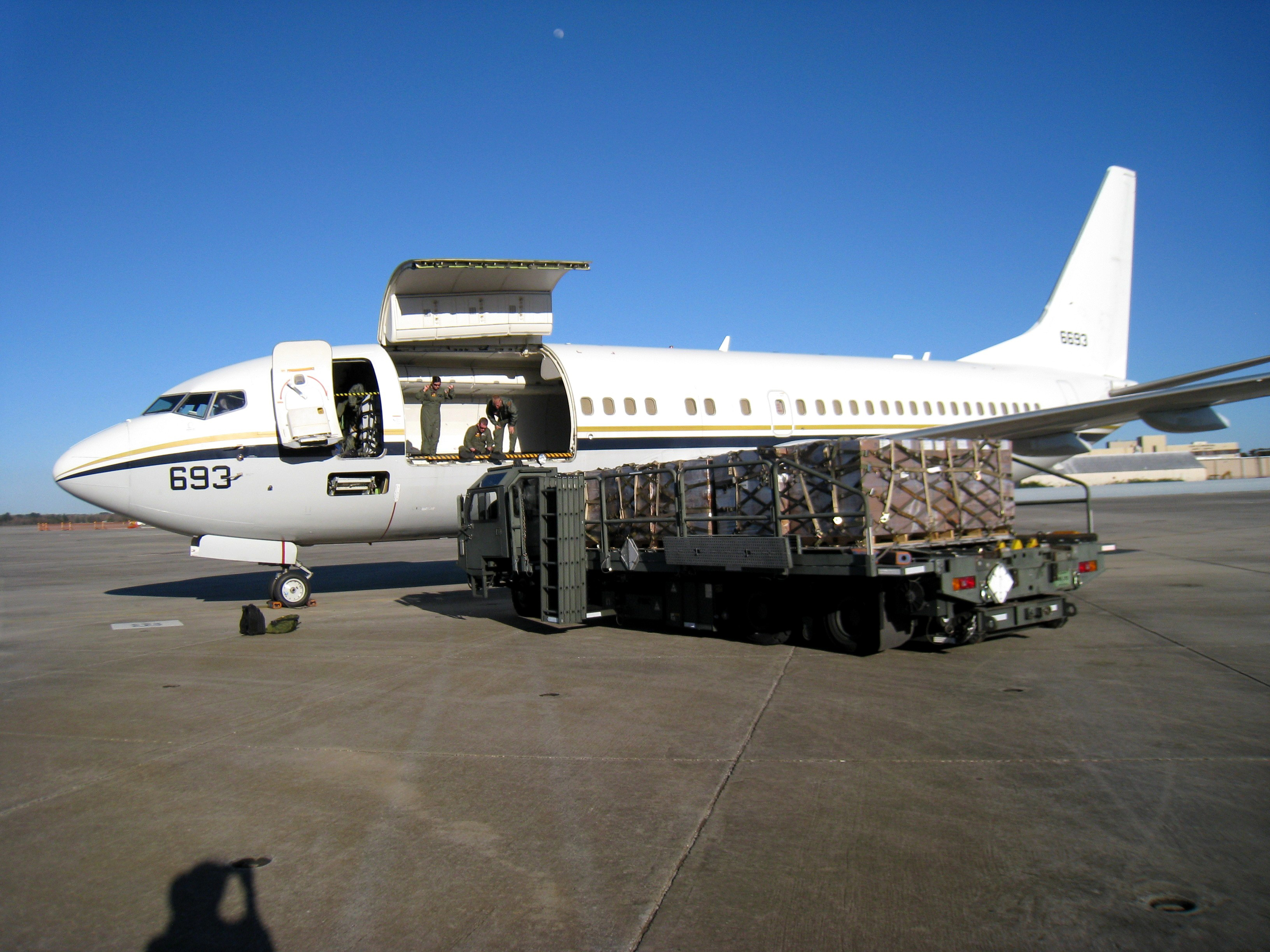
The Boeing C-40 Clipper is a military version of the 737-700C.

The Boeing C-40 Clipper is a military version of the 737-700C NG. It is used by both the United States Navy and the United States Air Force, and has been ordered by the United States Marine Corps. Technically, only the Navy C-40A variant is named "Clipper", whereas the USAF C-40B/C variants are officially unnamed.

=== P-8 Poseidon ===
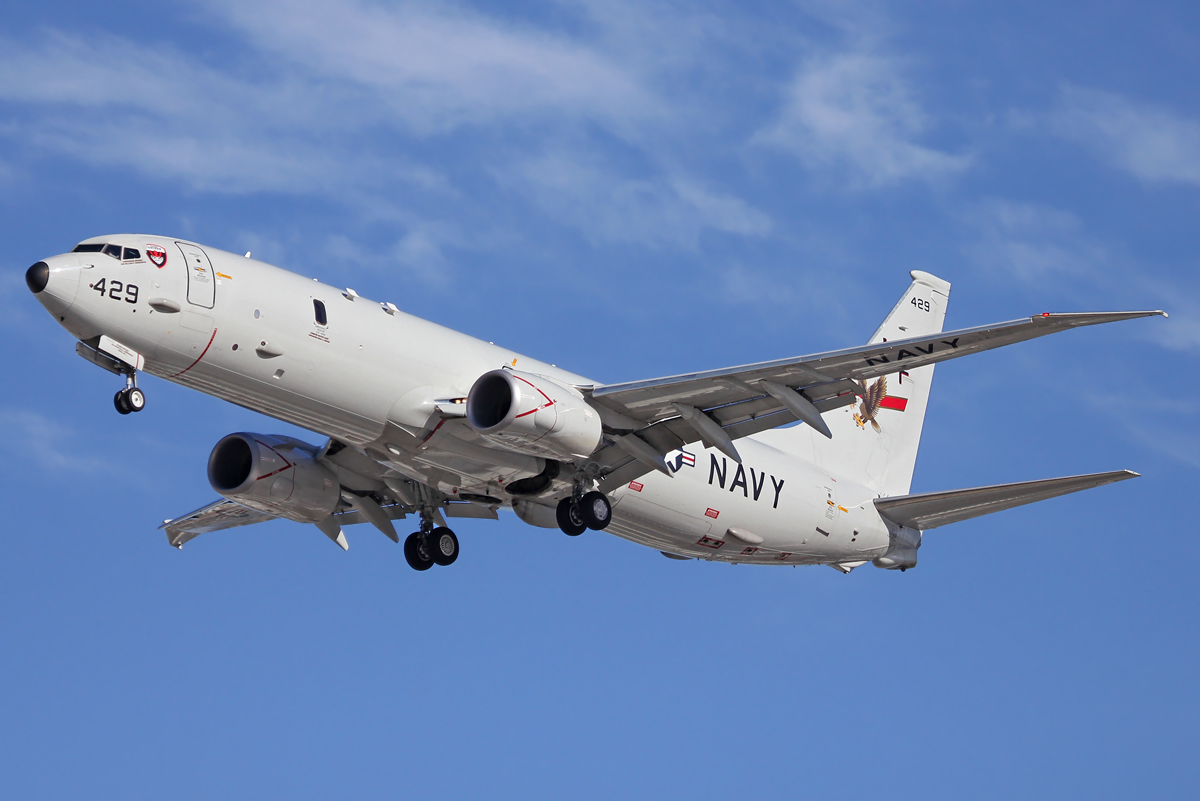
The P-8 Poseidon is a 737-800 variant for anti-submarine warfare, anti-surface warfare, and shipping interdiction.

The P-8 Poseidon developed for the United States Navy by Boeing Defense, Space & Security, based on the Next Generation 737-800ERX. The P-8 can be operated in the anti-submarine warfare (ASW), anti-surface warfare (ASUW), and shipping interdiction roles. It is armed with torpedoes, Harpoon anti-ship missiles and other weapons, and is able to drop and monitor sonobuoys, as well as operate in conjunction with other assets such as the Northrop Grumman MQ-4C Triton maritime surveillance unmanned aerial vehicle (UAV).

=== VC-96 ===
The VC-96 designation was applied to two 737-2N3s operated by the Brazilian Air Force's Special Transport Group (GTE).

=== Boeing Business Jet (BBJ) ===
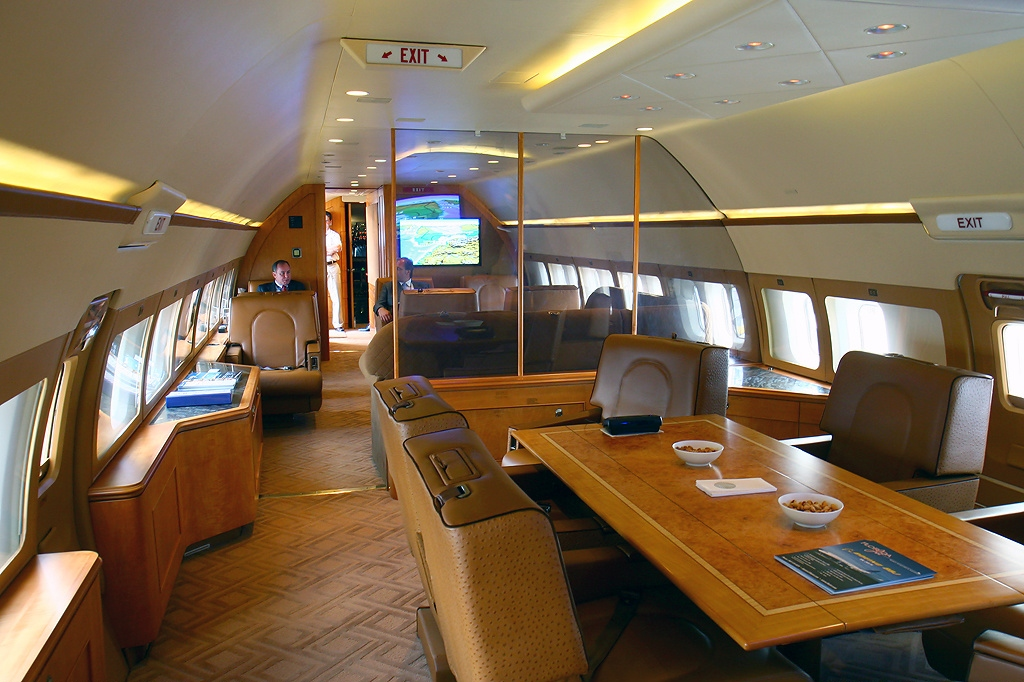
BBJ cabin example

In the late 1980s, Boeing marketed the 77-33 jet, a business jet version of the 737-300. The name was short-lived. After the introduction of the Next Generation series, Boeing introduced the Boeing Business Jet (BBJ) series. The BBJ1 was similar in dimensions to the 737-700 but had additional features, including stronger wings and landing gear from the 737-800, and had increased range over the other 737 models through the use of extra fuel tanks. The first BBJ rolled out on August 11, 1998, and flew for the first time on September 4.

On October 11, 1999, Boeing launched the BBJ2. Based on the 737-800, it is 19 feet 2 inches (5.84 m) longer than the BBJ1, with 25% more cabin space and twice the baggage space, but has slightly reduced range. It is also fitted with auxiliary belly fuel tanks and winglets. The first BBJ2 was delivered on February 28, 2001.

Boeing's BBJ3 is based on the 737-900ER. The BBJ3 has 1,120 square feet (104 m^{2}) of floor space, 35% more interior space, and 89% more luggage space than the BBJ2. It has an auxiliary fuel system, giving it a range of up to 4,725 nautical miles (8,751 km; 5,437 mi), and a Head-up display. Boeing completed the first example in August 2008. This aircraft's cabin is pressurized to a simulated 6,500-foot (2,000 m) altitude.

=== Boeing Converted Freighter program ===
The Boeing Converted Freighter program (BCF), or the 737-800BCF program, was launched by Boeing in 2016. It converts old 737-800 passenger jets to dedicated freighters. The first 737-800BCF was delivered in 2018 to GECAS, which is leased to West Atlantic. Boeing has signed an agreement with Chinese YTO Cargo Airlines to provide the airline with 737-800BCFs pending a planned program launch.

=== Experimental ===
Four 737 aircraft have been used in Boeing test programs. In 2012, a new 737-800 bound for American Airlines became the first ecoDemonstrator airframe in a program that continues annually into the 2020s. In conjunction with many industry partners, the program aims to reduce the environmental impact of aviation. In 2012 it tested the winglets which would eventually be used in the 737 MAX series. Testing also included a variable area exhaust nozzle, regenerative hydrogen fuel cells for electrical power, and sustainable aviation fuel (SAF).

In 2018, one of the 737 MAX 7 prototypes participated in Boeing's Quiet Technology Demonstrator 3 (QTD3) program, in which a NASA engine inlet designed to reduce engine noise was tested over an acoustic array at Moses Lake, Washington.

A 737 MAX 9 was used as the 2021 ecoDemonstrator. A new airframe in a special Alaska Airlines livery flew an extensive test program, a major part of which was the use of SAF in blends of up to 50% including a flight from Seattle to Glasgow, Scotland, to attend the United Nations COP26 Climate Change Conference. Other test areas included halon-free fire extinguisher (ground testing only), a low-profile anti-collision light, and text-based air traffic control communications. At the end of the testing the aircraft was returned to standard configuration, and was delivered to Alaska Airlines in 2022.

During October 2023 a 737 MAX 10 destined for United Airlines flew a series of test flights to compare the emissions of SAF, including the contrails, with those of conventional fuel. The emissions were measured by NASA's Douglas DC-8 Airborne Science Lab which flew close behind the 737, which wore a special livery as part of a series of special tests named ecoDemonstrator Explorer.

== Competition ==
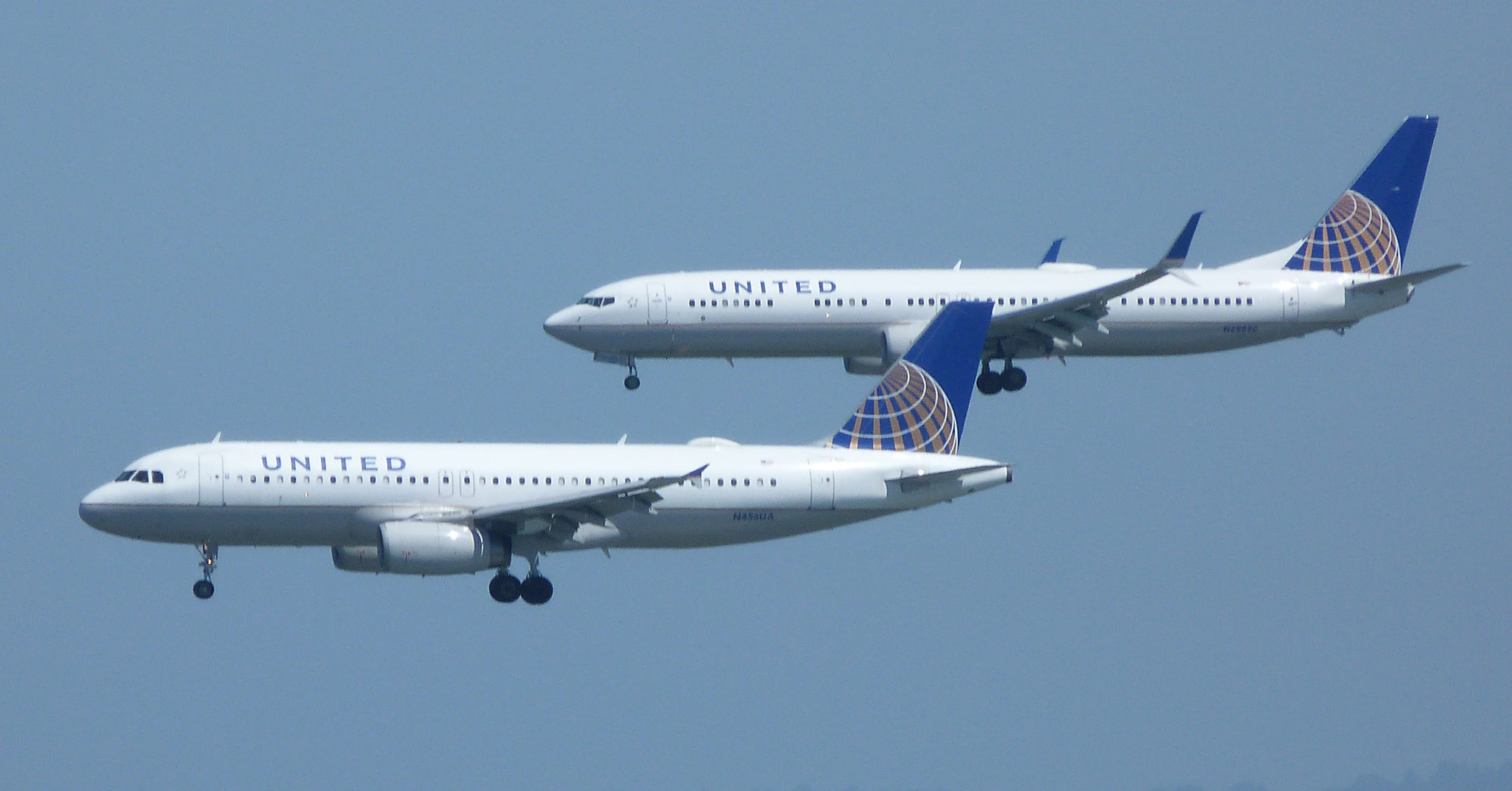
United Airlines Airbus A320 (front) and Boeing 737-900 on final approach

The Boeing 737 Classic, Next Generation and MAX series have faced significant competition from the Airbus A320 family first introduced in 1988. The relatively recent Airbus A220 family now also competes against the smaller capacity end of the 737 variants. The A320 was developed to compete also with the McDonnell Douglas MD-80/90 and 95 series; the 95 later becoming the Boeing 717. Since July 2017, Airbus had a 59.4% market share of the re-engined single aisle market, while Boeing had 40.6%; Boeing had doubts on over-ordered A320neos by new operators and expected to narrow the gap with replacements not already ordered. However, in July 2017, Airbus had still 1,350 more A320neo orders than Boeing had for the 737 MAX.

Boeing delivered 8,918 of the 737 family between March 1988 and December 2018, while Airbus delivered 8,605 A320 family aircraft over a similar period since first delivery in early 1988.

The Comac C919 has also been described as a competitor to the Boeing 737.

== Operators ==
The five largest operators of the Boeing 737 are Southwest Airlines (815), Ryanair (566), United Airlines (496), American Airlines (363), and Delta Air Lines (240) as of June 2024.

=== Usage ===
==== Civilian ====
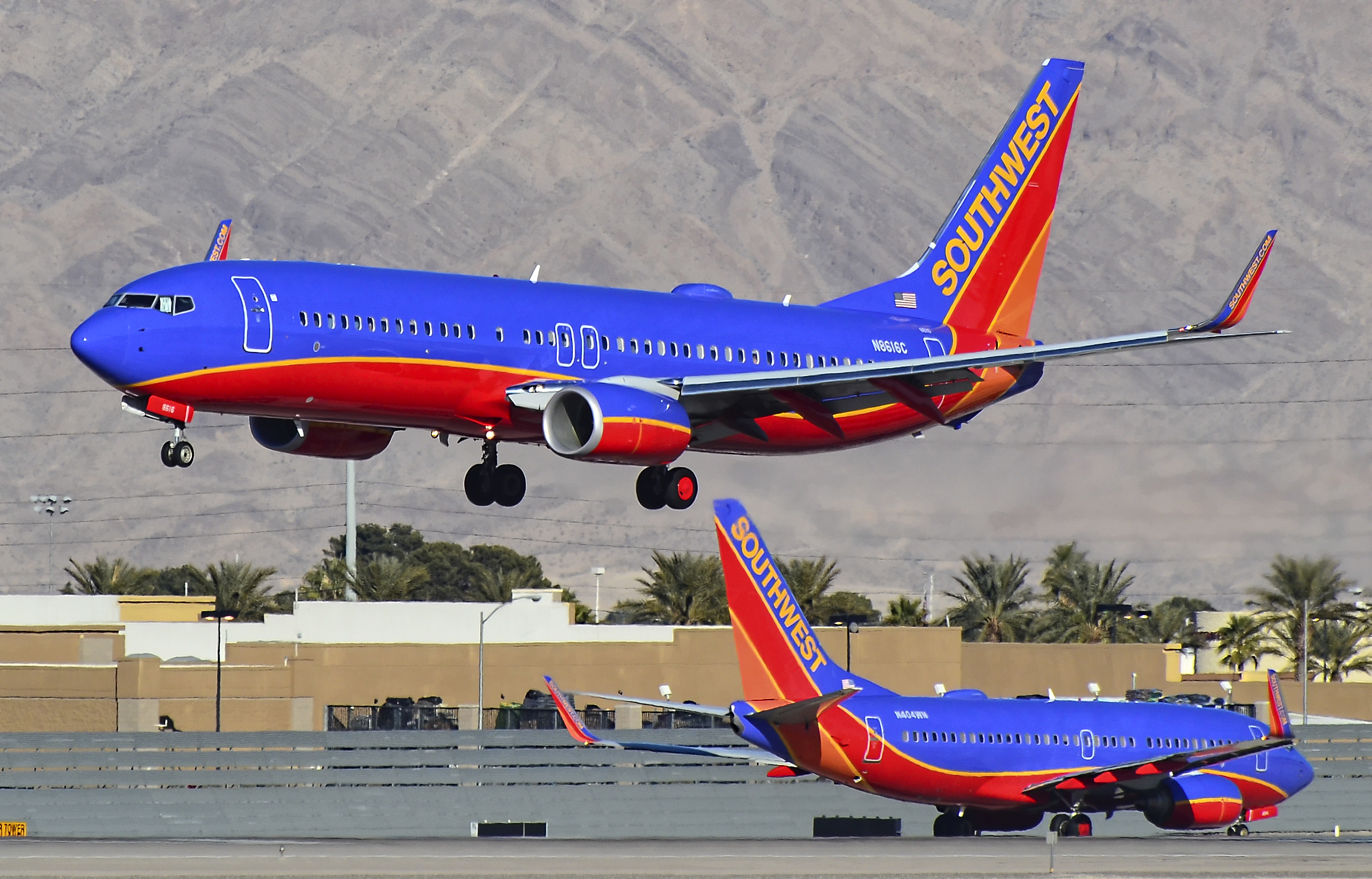
The largest 737 operator is Southwest Airlines.

In 2006, over 4,500 Boeing 737s were operated by more than 500 airlines, flying to 1,200 destinations in 190 countries and on average 1,250 aircraft were airborne, with two either departing or landing every five seconds. The 737 was the most commonly flown aircraft in 2008, 2009, and 2010.

In 2013, over 5,580 Boeing 737s were operated by more than 342 airlines in 111 countries, which represented more than 25% of the worldwide fleet of large jet airliners. The 737 had carried over 16.8 billion passengers (twice of 7.1 billion world population in that time) over 119 billion miles (192 billion km) with more than 184 million flights or 264 million hours in the air.

In 2016, there were 6,512 Boeing 737 airliners in service (5,567 737NGs plus 945 737-200s and 737 Classics), more than the 6,510 Airbus A320 family. while in 2017, there were 6,858 737s in service (5,968 737NGs plus 890 737-200s and classics), fewer than the 6,965 A320 family.

By 2018, over 7,500 Boeing 737s were in service and on average 2,800 aircraft were airborne, with two either departing or landing every three seconds, carrying around three million passengers daily. At the time, the global 737 fleet had carried over 22 billion passengers since its introduction.

As of June 2021, there were 9,315 Boeing 737s in service, slightly fewer than the 9,353 of the A320 family, as more 737s were already out of service.

==== Military ====
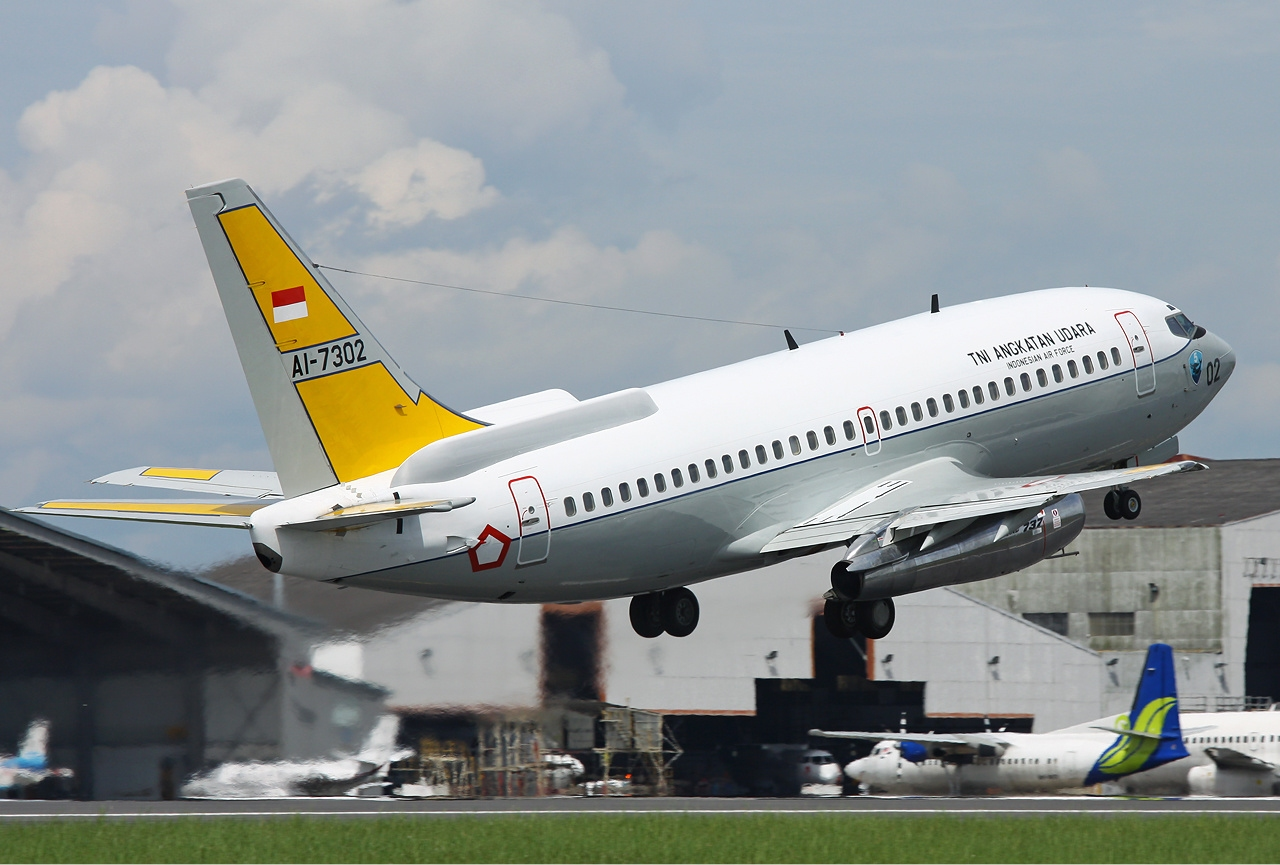
Indonesian Air Force Boeing 737-2X9 Surveiller (AI-7302) at Sultan Abdul Aziz Shah Airport

Many countries operate the 737 passenger, BBJ, and cargo variants in government or military applications. Users with 737s include:

- Argentina
- Australia
- Brazil
- Chile
- China
- Colombia
- Democratic Republic of the Congo
- India
- Indonesia
- Iran
- Kazakhstan
- Malaysia
- Mexico
- Mongolia
- Netherlands
- Nigeria
- Pakistan
- Peru
- Poland
- South Africa
- Saudi Arabia
- Republic of Korea
- Taiwan
- Thailand
- Turkey
- United Kingdom
- United States

=== Orders and deliveries ===
==== Orders ====
The 737 family had the highest, cumulative orders for any airliner until surpassed by the Airbus A320 family in October 2019. In that year, 737 orders dropped by 90%, as 737 MAX orders dried up after the March grounding. The 737 MAX backlog fell by 182, mainly due to the Jet Airways bankruptcy, a drop in Boeing's airliner backlog was a first in at least the past 30 years.

As of October 2026, 17,791 units of the 737 have been ordered, with 5,019 orders are pending, or 4,654 when including "additional criteria for recognizing contracted backlog with customers beyond the existence of a firm contract" (ASC 606 Adjustment).

==== Deliveries ====
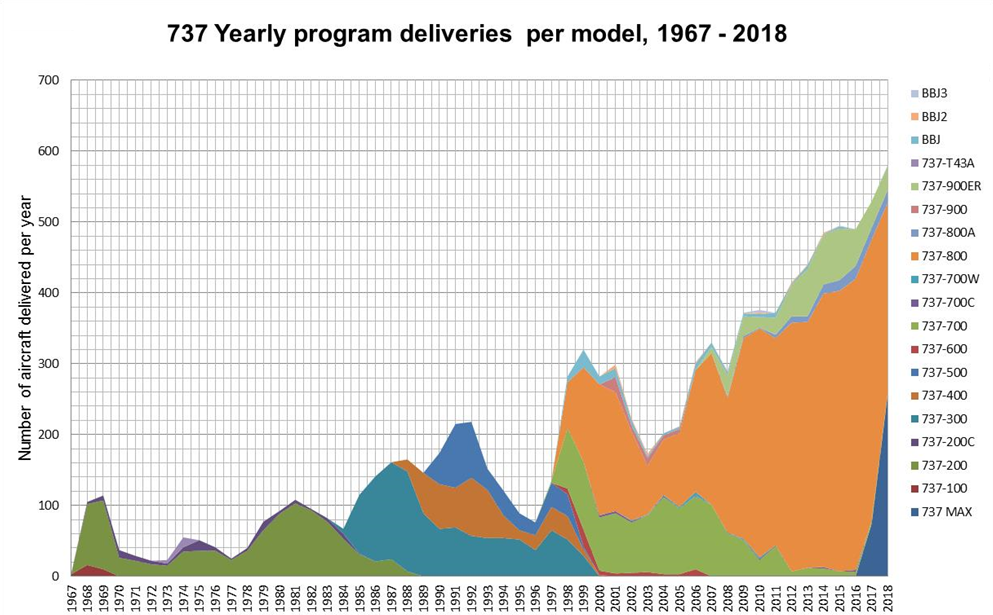
737 deliveries per year, 1967–2018

The 5,000th 737 was delivered to Southwest Airlines on February 13, 2006, the 6,000th 737 to Norwegian Air Shuttle in April 2009, the 7,000th 737 to Flydubai on December 16, 2011, the 8,000th 737 to United Airlines on April 16, 2014, and the 9,000th 737 to China United Airlines in April 2016. The 10,000th 737 was ordered in July 2012, rolled out on March 13, 2018, and was to be delivered to Southwest Airlines; the backlog at the time stood at over 4,600 aircraft.

The 737 family had the highest total deliveries of any airliner until it was surpassed by the Airbus A320 family in September 2025. In total, 12,772 units of the 737 have been delivered as of October 2026, while 12,955 units of the competing A320 have been delivered.

Deliveries by year for all 737 generations and model series
Year	Total	2026	2025	2024	2023	2022	2021	2020	2019	2018	2017	2016	2015	2014	2013	2012	2011	2010	2009	2008	2007
Deliveries	12,772	400	447	265	396	387	263	43 (Note: The 2020 deliveries consist of 16 NG-based variants and 27 737 MAXs.)	127	580	529	490	495	485	440	415	372	376	372	290	330

2006	2005	2004	2003	2002	2001	2000	1999	1998	1997	1996	1995	1994	1993	1992	1991	1990	1989	1988	1987
302	212	202	173	223	299	282	320	282	135	76	89	121	152	218	215	174	146	165	161

1986	1985	1984	1983	1982	1981	1980	1979	1978	1977	1976	1975	1974	1973	1972	1971	1970	1969	1968	1967
141	115	67	82	95	108	92	77	40	25	41	51	55	23	22	29	37	114	105	4

=== Model summary ===
Orders and deliveries by generation and model series
Generation	Model series	ICAO code	Orders	Deliveries	Unfilled orders	First flight
737 Original	737-100	B731	30	30	—	April 9, 1967
737 Original	737-200	B732	991	991	—	August 8, 1967
737 Original	737-200C	B732	104	104	—	September 18, 1968
737 Original	737-T43A	B732	19	19	—	March 10, 1973
737 Classic	737-300	B733	1,113	1,113	—	February 24, 1984
737 Classic	737-400	B734	486	486	—	February 19, 1988
737 Classic	737-500	B735	389	389	—	June 30, 1989
737 NG	737-600	B736	69	69	—	January 22, 1998
737 NG	737-700	B737	1,130	1,130	—	February 9, 1997
737 NG	737-700C	B737	22	22	—	April 14, 2000
737 NG	737-700W	B737	14	14	—	May 20, 2004
737 NG	737-800	B738	4,991	4,989	2	July 31, 1997
737 NG	737-800A	B738	224	192	32	April 25, 2009
737 NG	737-900	B739	52	52	—	August 3, 2000
737 NG	737-900ER	B739	505	505	—	September 1, 2006
737 BBJ	737-BBJ1 (-700)	B73G	122	122	—	September 4, 1998
737 BBJ	737-BBJ2 (-800)	B738	23	23	—	N/A
737 BBJ	737-BBJ3 (-900)	B739	7	7	—	N/A
737 MAX	737-7	B37M	7,500	—	276	March 16, 2018
737 MAX	737-8	B38M	7,500	2,515	2,990	January 29, 2016
737 MAX	737-9	B39M	7,500	2,515	175	April 13, 2017
737 MAX	737-10	B3XM	7,500	—	1,544	June 18, 2021
Boeing 737 family			17,791	12,772	5,019	

== Accidents and incidents ==
As of November 2023, the Boeing 737 family has been involved in 529 aviation accidents and incidents, including 215 hull loss accidents out of 234 hull-losses, resulting in a total of 5,779 fatalities.

A Boeing analysis of commercial jet airplane accidents between 1959 and 2013 found that the hull loss rate for the Original series was 1.75 per million departures, for the Classic series 0.54, and the Next Generation series 0.27. As of 2023, the analysis showed that the hull loss rate for the Original series was 1.78 (0.87 fatal hull loss rate), for the Classic series 0.81 (0.26 fatal hull loss rate), for the Next Generation series 0.18 (0.04 fatal hull loss rate), and for the MAX series 1.48 (1.48 fatal hull loss rate) per million departures.

During the 1990s, a series of rudder issues on series -200 and -300 aircraft resulted in multiple incidents. In two total loss accidents, United Airlines Flight 585 (a -200 series) and USAir Flight 427, (a -300), the pilots lost control of the aircraft following a sudden and unexpected deflection of the rudder, killing everyone aboard, a total of 157 people. Similar rudder issues led to a temporary loss of control on at least five other 737 flights before the problem was ultimately identified. The National Transportation Safety Board determined that the accidents and incidents were the result of a design flaw that could result in an uncommanded movement of the aircraft's rudder. As a result of the NTSB's findings, the Federal Aviation Administration ordered that the rudder servo valves be replaced on all 737s and mandated new training protocols for pilots to handle an unexpected movement of control surfaces.

Following the crashes of two 737 MAX 8 aircraft, Lion Air Flight 610 in October 2018 and Ethiopian Airlines Flight 302 in March 2019, which caused 346 deaths, civil aviation authorities around the world grounded the 737 MAX series. On December 16, 2019, Boeing announced that it would suspend production of the 737 MAX from January 2020. Production of the MAX series resumed on May 27, 2020.

== Aircraft on display ==
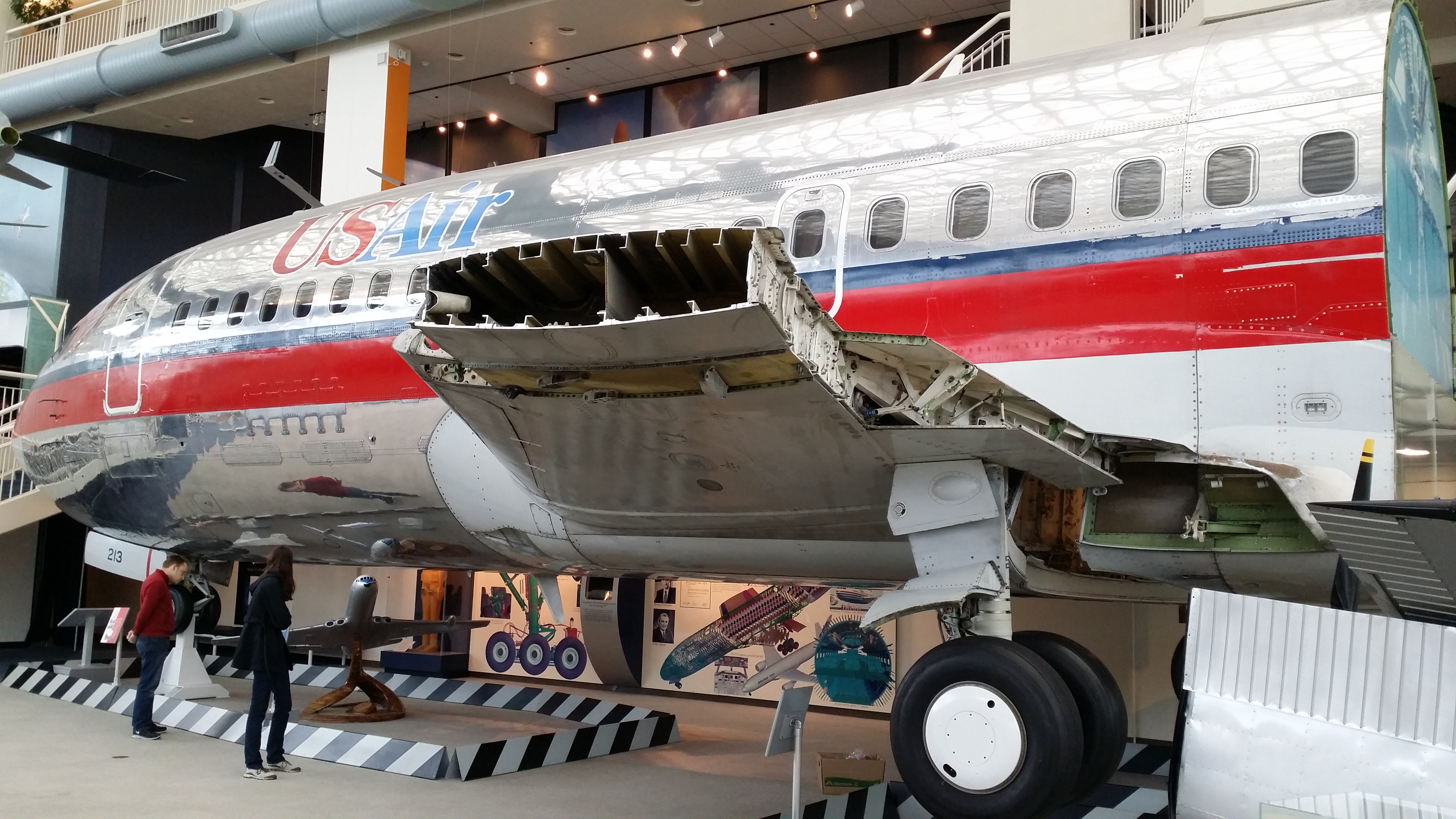
USAir 737-200 N213US fuselage section at the Museum of Flight

Owing to the 737's long production history and popularity, many older 737s have found use in museums after reaching the end of useful service.

- 19437/1: 737-130 registered N515NA on static display at the Museum of Flight in Seattle, Washington. It was the first 737 built and is painted in NASA markings.
- 19047/14: 737-222 registered N9009U preserved by Southern Illinois University Carbondale at Southern Illinois Airport.
- 20213/160: 737-201 registered N213US forward fuselage on static display at the Museum of Flight in Seattle, Washington, in USAir livery.
- 20561/292: 737-281 registered LV-WTX on static display at the National Museum of Aeronautics in Morón, Buenos Aires.
- 20562/293: 737-281 registered CC-CSK fuselage preserved at Motel Bahía in Concón, Chile.
- 21262/470: 737-2H4 registered C-GWJT on static display at the British Columbia Institute of Technology Aerospace Technology Campus in Richmond, British Columbia. It is used for ground instructional training. The aircraft was donated by WestJet and bears its livery.
- 21340/499: 737-2H4 registered N29SW on static display at the Kansas Aviation Museum in Wichita, Kansas. It was formerly operated by Ryan International Airlines and prior to that Southwest Airlines.
- 21712/557: 737-275 registered C-GIPW preserved in operational condition at Alberta Flying Heritage Museum in Villeneuve, Alberta. Painted in Pacific Western Airlines livery.
- 22578/767: 737-290C registered N740AS on static display at the Alaska Aviation Heritage Museum in Anchorage, Alaska. It was formerly operated by Alaska Airlines.
- 22826/878: 737-2H4 registered YV1361 preserved at a hotel in Santiago, Chile. It was formerly operated by Avior Airlines.
- 23059/980: 737-2Z6 registered 22–222 on static display at the Royal Thai Air Force Museum in Bangkok.
- 22940/1037: 737-3H4 registered N300SW on static display at the Frontiers of Flight Museum in Dallas, Texas. It was the first 737-300 operated by Southwest Airlines, having been delivered in November 1984.
- 23257/1124: 737-301 registered PK-AWU on static display at ITE College Central in Singapore.
- 23472/1194: 737-219 registered ZS-SMD on static display at the South African Airways Museum in Germiston, Gauteng.
- 23660/1294: 737-377 registered G-CELS (nickname Elsie) on static display at Norwich International Aviation Academy, as an aircraft maintenance trainer. It is painted in the silver & red Jet2.com color scheme, without the logo branding.
- 27286/2528: 737-3Q8 registered N759BA on static display at the Pima Air & Space Museum in Tucson, Arizona. It is painted in China Southern Airlines markings, and was previously operated by the airline as B-2921.
- 25304/2144 737-436 registered G-DOCB on static display at Cranfield University, United Kingdom as a research and teaching aircraft within the Digital Aviation Research and Technology Centre (DARTeC). The aircraft was donated by British Airways and carries a special Cranfield livery.
- 28728/2938 737-5U3 registered PK-GGD on static display at Banda Aceh Hajj Dormitory, Indonesia as training aid for hajj pilgrims flight. The aircraft was donated by Garuda Indonesia and its subsidiary Citilink, both formerly operated the aircraft, and is painted in Garuda's retro livery.
- 20523/285 – 737-287 registered LV-JTD formerly operated by Aerolíneas Argentinas on display at the República de los Niños Educational Circuit in La Plata, Buenos Aires Province.

== Specifications (Boeing 737-200 with JT8D-15A) ==
Data from

General characteristics

- Crew: 2
- Capacity: 102 passengers in two classes or 115 in one class, and 875 cu ft (24.8 m^{3}) of cargo
- Length: 100 ft 2 in (30.53 m)
- Wingspan: 93 ft 0 in (28.35 m)
- Width: 12 ft 4 in (3.76 m) (fuselage)
- Height: 36 ft 10 in (11.23 m)
- Wing area: 979.9 sq ft (91.04 m^{2})
- Empty weight: 65,300 lb (29,620 kg)
- Max takeoff weight: 128,100 lb (58,105 kg)
- Fuel capacity: 5,970 US gal (22,600 L; 4,970 imp gal)
- Powerplant: 2 × Pratt & Whitney JT8D-15A turbofan engine, 15,500 lbf (69 kN) thrust each

Performance

- Maximum speed: Mach 0.84
- Cruise speed: 480 mph (780 km/h, 420 kn)
- Range: 3,000 mi (4,800 km, 2,600 nmi)
- Service ceiling: 37,000 ft (11,000 m)
- Takeoff distance: 6,099 ft (1,859 m)

== See also ==
Related development

- Boeing 737 AEW&C
- Boeing 737 Classic
- Boeing 737 MAX
- Boeing 737 Next Generation
- Boeing Business Jet
- Boeing C-40 Clipper
- Boeing P-8 Poseidon
- Boeing T-43

Aircraft of comparable role, configuration, and era

- Airbus A220
- Airbus A320 family
- Boeing 717
- Comac C919
- Dassault Mercure
- Embraer 195
- McDonnell Douglas DC-9
- McDonnell Douglas MD-80
- McDonnell Douglas MD-90
- Sukhoi Superjet 100
- Yakovlev Yak-42D
