= Fleuri Perron =

Canadian politician

Fleuri Perron (also spelled Fleury Perron) (February 4, 1866 - August 1931) was a businessman, politician, and mayor of St. Albert, Alberta.

== Early life ==
Perron was born in Portneuf in 1866, and moved to Egg Lake in what is now Sturgeon County, Alberta in February 1883, after hearing Bishop Vital-Justin Grandin encouraging francophones to move west. In 1892 he married Lina Laliberté, and soon after moved to St. Albert.

== Business career ==
In 1896, Perron acquired the Windsor Hotel in St. Albert, which he operated for four years before selling it. In 1900, he opened a brick factory and purchased a general store which he operated with Cheri Hebert until 1907, when he bought out Hebert.

In 1912, he re-entered the hotel business by becoming President of the Royal Hotel Company Limited, which opened the Royal Hotel in 1913 to replace another hotel that had burned down. Though the hotel was "the best north of Edmonton, the advent of Prohibition in 1915 put an end to its viability, and it was soon closed and demolished.

In the meantime, in 1914, he and Hebert had acquired a paddleboat called the Ste. Theresa which they used to offer recreational trips on the Sturgeon River and Big Lake. When water levels in the river fell too low for the boat to operate, it was relocated to Lac Ste. Anne, where it was eventually destroyed in a storm.

In 1919 his general store was destroyed in a fire, and he opened a butcher shop. He operated this until the mid-twenties, when he moved to California with his son, Alex Perron, to attempt to go into business there. His attempts were unsuccessful, and he returned to St. Albert shortly thereafter. Upon his return, he rented another general store which he operated until his death.

== Public service ==
Though he had been one of many St. Albert residents to sign a petition in 1898 protesting the previously unincorporated community's incorporation as a village, Perron was nevertheless elected to the first St. Albert Town Council in 1904 as a councillor. He served in this capacity until 1907, when he was elected mayor. He served one one-year term as mayor before leaving political life altogether.

In 1906, Perron became the first lieutenant of the St. Albert Troop of Squadron D, of the St. Albert Mounted Rifles. In 1912, he co-founded the St. Albert Chamber of Commerce, and served as its first Vice President. He was also the first President of the Alberta French Canadian Association.

== Family, death, and legacy ==
Fleuri and Lina Perron had nine children, six of whom survived infancy. His son, Alex Perron himself served as a mayor of St. Albert. Another son, Eugene, married Evelyn Hogan, daughter of Michael Hogan, the longest-serving mayor in St. Albert's history.

Fleuri Perron died in 1931. Perron Street, a major street in St. Albert's downtown, is named in his honour. It was renamed in 1967 from Piron Street. The town council at the time claimed that it was only correcting a misspelling and that the road had always been intended to be named in Perron's honour, but an alternative theory states that it had been originally named in honour of France's Piron family, which had donated the bells for the St. Albert mission.

Preceded by Cheri Hebert	Mayor of St. Albert; 1908	Succeeded by Lucien Boudreau
