= Nolan Crouse =

Canadian politician

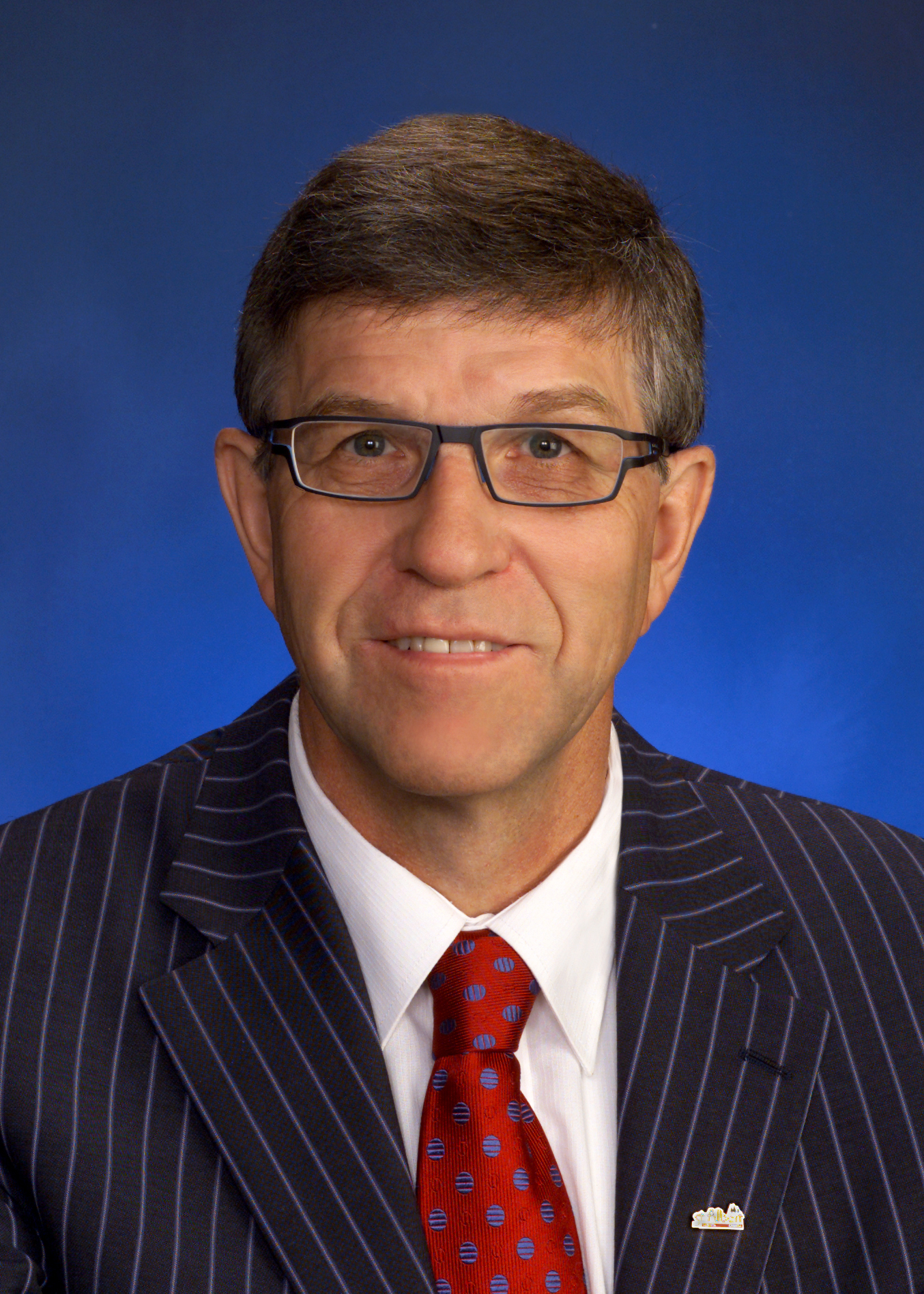
Nolan Crouse

Nolan Crouse is the former Mayor of St. Albert, Alberta, Canada and a former candidate for the leadership of the Alberta Liberal Party.

== Background ==
Crouse was born in Viking, Alberta, and attended Irma High School in nearby Irma. He received a Master of Business Administration from Cape Breton University.

While in Grande Prairie, he co-founded the Grande Prairie Indoor Ice Society, an organization that raised funds for the Canada Games Arena (now Revolution Place) needed to host the 1995 Canada Winter Games. Crouse sat on the bid committee that led preparations to host the Canada Winter Games. He is also a former hockey coach who had stints with both the Fort Saskatchewan Traders and the Brooks Bandits of the Alberta Junior Hockey League, as well as the St. Albert Merchants of the Capital Junior Hockey League that plays in the Edmonton Region.

Crouse has held managerial positions in companies, including Procter and Gamble, Alberta Energy Company, West Fraser Timber Co., Slave Lake Pulp Corporation, Sunchild Forest Products, and Crouse Developments Ltd. (which he owned). During these years, Crouse sat on the Board of Directors of the Alberta Forest Products Association Public Relations Committee and the Forest Industries Suppliers Association Board.

== Political career ==
He ran for office in 2004, when he was elected to St. Albert City Council as one of six councilors. In May 2007, Crouse indicated that he would either seek re-election or run for mayor, depending on the plans of then-mayor Paul Chalifoux. Chalifoux subsequently announced that he was leaving municipal politics. On May 31, 2007, Crouse announced on his blog that he was running for mayor in the 2007 municipal election. He defeated Richard Plain and another opponent to become mayor in October 2007.

On October 18, 2010, he was elected to a second term and, in 2013, a third term. Crouse also served 5.5 years as chair of the Capital Region Board (CRB), a board of 24 municipalities. Crouse was re-elected to serve on several occasions. He also served as chair of the CRB's Transit Committee for three years in the infancy of the CRB from 2009 to 2012. Crouse completed serving his third term as mayor and ranks as the fourth-longest-serving mayor in the history of St. Albert.

In January 2017, Crouse announced he would not seek a fourth term as mayor. Crouse announced later that same month that he was going to run for the leadership of the Alberta Liberal Party but stated that, if elected, he intended to serve the remainder of his term as mayor, which ended in 2017. Crouse, the sole leadership candidate at the time, withdrew his candidacy two days before the deadline for individuals to register as candidates. He said his reasons for withdrawing "will be kept private."

== Personal life ==
Crouse is married and has three children and five grandchildren.
