= 2017 Alberta Liberal Party leadership election =

Canadian provincial party race

- Date: June 4, 2017
- Resigning leader: Raj Sherman
- Won by: David Khan
- Ballots: 1
- Candidates: 2
- Entrance fee: $5,000

An Alberta Liberal Party leadership election was held at the Alberta Liberal Party's 2017 Annual General Meeting in order choose a permanent successor to Raj Sherman who resigned on January 26, 2015. Sherman, who was under investigation over alleged illegal campaign donations, indicated in a statement to the media that he was resigning as leader immediately for personal reasons and did not run for re-election as a Member of the Legislative Assembly of Alberta at the provincial election held on May 5, 2015. The leadership election was originally scheduled for April 23, 2016 but has been delayed for a year to give prospective candidates more time to organize. David Khan was elected.

== Timeline ==
- January 26, 2015 – Raj Sherman announces his immediate resignation as leader.
- February 1, 2015 – Party board of directors elects former leader David Swann as interim leader over Laurie Blakeman and rejects Blakeman's proposal for a merger with the Alberta Party, at least until after the next provincial election. Swann is expected to lead the Liberals into the next provincial election, widely expected to be called for the spring of 2015. The party says it will hold a leadership election within a year but will not be setting a date for the vote until the fall.
- April 7, 2015 – Alberta legislature is dissolved for a general election.
- May 5, 2015 – Alberta general election is held. Alberta New Democratic Party elects a majority government and brings the Progressive Conservative dynasty to an end after 44 years. The Liberals are reduced from 5 seats to 1 seat with Swann elected as the Liberals' only MLA.
- May 30, 2015 – Party holds its Annual General Meeting but does not schedule a leadership election. Swann indicates he wishes to see a leadership election "within a year" and that he intends to continue as interim party leader until then.
- January 9, 2016 – Liberal executive met in Red Deer. The executive voted to postpone the leadership election until 2017, in order to give candidates and the party more time to prepare, and decided unanimously to have Swann stay on as interim leader until then.
- January 16, 2017 – Nominations open.
- March 1, 2017 – Nolan Crouse launches his leadership campaign.
- March 29, 2017 – Crouse withdraws two days before the nomination deadline leaving no candidates in the running.
- March 31, 2017 – Kerry Cundal and David Khan submit nomination papers; nominations close.
- April 3, 2017 – Cundal and Khan nominations are both approved by the party and become official candidates.
- April 8, 2017 – Candidates debate in Calgary.
- May 6, 2017 – Candidates debate in Edmonton.
- May 15, 2017 – Cutoff for new members to join the party.
- May 27 – June 3, 2017 – Voting occurs through a province-wide online vote with all party members eligible to cast ballots.
- June 4, 2017 – David Khan is announced as the new leader.

== Candidates ==
=== Kerry Cundal ===
Background

Cundal is a Calgary lawyer and was the Liberal Party of Canada candidate in the 2015 federal election in the riding of Calgary Signal Hill. She has also served as an Immigration and Refugee Board of Canada adjudicator. Cundal is a human rights advocate and a former teacher.

Date nomination submitted: March 31, 2017
Date campaign launched: April 3, 2017
Supporters
MLAs:
Former MLAs: (2) Harry Chase (Calgary-Varsity, 2004–2012), Nicholas Taylor (Note: Taylor officially endorsed both candidates.) (Westlock-Sturgeon, 1986–1993; Redwater, 1993–1996; Alberta Liberal Party leader, 1974–1988; Senator for Alberta, 1996–2002)
Federal politicians:
Former federal politicians:
Municipal politicians:
Former municipal politicians:
Other prominent supporters: (8) Brian Gold (former Liberal Party of Canada in Alberta president), Kara Levis (National Women's Liberal Commission president), former MLA candidates Pete Helfrich, Avinash Khangura, Mike Hanlon, Harbaksh Sekhon, Iqtidar Awan, and Ali Bin Zahid.
Organizations:
Policies
Cundal is running on a "unite the centre" platform. She favours co-operation with the Alberta Party, as well as former Progressive Conservatives alienated by Jason Kenney's victory in that party's 2017 leadership race.
Other information

=== David Khan ===
Background

Khan is a Calgary lawyer who practices indigenous law. He was previously the party's 2014 by-election candidate in Calgary-West and 2015 provincial election candidate in Calgary-Buffalo. Prior to entering the race, Khan served as the party's executive vice-president.

Date nomination submitted: March 31, 2017
Date campaign launched: April 3, 2017
Supporters
MLAs:
Former MLAs: (1) Nicholas Taylor (Note: Taylor officially endorsed both candidates.) (Westlock-Sturgeon, 1986–1993; Redwater, 1993–1996; Alberta Liberal Party leader, 1974–1988; Senator for Alberta, 1996–2002)
Federal politicians:
Former federal politicians: (1) Tommy Banks (Senator for Alberta, 2000–2011)
Municipal politicians: (1) Kevin McLean (City of Grande Prairie councillor)
Former municipal politicians: (2) Christine Brown (former City of St. Albert councillor), Bob Russell (former City of St. Albert councillor; Alberta Liberal Party leader, 1971–1974)
Other prominent supporters: (2) Grant Dunlop (former Alberta Liberal Party president), Robbie Schuett (Liberal Party of Canada in Alberta president)
Organizations:
Policies
Khan does not support co-operation with the Alberta Party or other provincial parties, however, he does support forging closer ties with the Liberal Party of Canada. Khan's policy platform includes a basic income pilot project, elimination of the small business tax, proportional representation for the Legislature, more free votes for MLAs, bringing private schools into the public system, and establishing universal pharmacare for those under 24.
Other information
If elected, Khan would be the first openly gay leader of a major Alberta political party.

== Withdrawn candidates ==
=== Nolan Crouse ===
Background

Crouse has served three terms as mayor of St. Albert, beginning in 2007. Previously, he was a city councillor for one term. Outside of politics, Crouse has held a variety of careers, including hockey coach, chemical technologist, and small business owner. Previously unaffiliated, Crouse joined the party in November 2016.

Date candidacy registered: January 17, 2017
Date campaign launched: March 1, 2017
Date campaign withdrawn: March 29, 2017
Supporters
MLAs:
Former MLAs:
Federal politicians:
Former federal politicians:
Municipal politicians:
Former municipal politicians:
Other prominent supporters:
Organizations:
Policies:
Other information
Crouse, at the time the sole leadership candidate, withdrew two days before the deadline for candidate registration. He said his reasons for withdrawing "will be kept private".

== Declined ==
- Laurie Blakeman, former MLA (Edmonton-Centre, 1997–2015) and third place candidate in 2011 leadership election. Had expressed an interest in becoming interim leader, and said that, while she is not interested in becoming permanent leader, she would not rule it out altogether. Blakeman proposed a merger with the Alberta Party.
- Harpreet Gill, Liberal candidate in Edmonton-Mill Creek (2015).
- Dan MacLennan, executive director of the Alberta Construction Safety Association, former president of the Alberta Union of Provincial Employees, vice-president of constituencies for the Alberta Liberal Party.
- Russell Scantlebury, Calgary resident and TEDxCalgary contributor.
- Dr. David Swann, MLA (Calgary-Mountain View, 2004–present), interim leader of the party (2015–present), former permanent leader (2008–2011).
- Donna Wilson, University of Alberta nursing professor, 2014 provincial candidate in Edmonton-Whitemud. by-election and 2015 Provincial Candidate in Edmonton-Riverview.

== Results ==
Candidate	Votes	Percentage
David Khan	899	54.8%
Kerry Cundal	772	46.2%
Total	1,671	100%

Abstentions: 10

== See also ==
- 2017 Progressive Conservative Association of Alberta leadership election
