= Michael Hogan (Canadian politician) =

Canadian politician

Michael Hogan (August 16, 1872 – June 30, 1943) was a businessman, politician, and longest-serving mayor of St. Albert, Alberta.

== Early life ==
Michael Hogan was born August 16, 1872, in Park Hill, Ontario, to Irish immigrants. He was a teacher and farmer in Ontario before immigrating to Alberta in 1900. He taught in Strathcona (which was amalgamated with Edmonton in 1912) before moving to St. Albert. In 1910 he entered the insurance and real estate businesses with Lucien Boudreau; he would eventually buy Boudreau out.

== Public service ==
Hogan became the secretary of the Municipal District of Ray (which was incorporated into the new Municipal District of Morinville in 1943) in 1905, and held the position until shortly before his death. He also served as Ray's police magistrate between 1917 and 1921, and was involved with the St. Albert Board of Trade and served on the St. Albert Town Council.

In 1919, Hogan was elected Mayor of St. Albert, a position that he would hold for twenty-four years, which is still a St. Albert record. At the time he took office, the town's finances were in poor shape. To cope with this situation, Hogan eliminated the town's policeman (who was responsible, in addition to the preservation of law and order, for such diverse tasks as sidewalk maintenance). In 1924, the town also reluctantly cut its teachers' salaries. In 1925, the policeman was restored.

These measures were not sufficient to turn St. Albert's finances around. In 1927, the report of the municipal inspector noted debts totalling $16,500 and commented that the town's "financial situation is not at all good." The same year, the policeman was eliminated once more - in favour of a Police Committee that would be responsible for hiring police on an ad hoc basis as needed - and just as quickly restored.

In 1928, an agreement was reached with Calgary Power to supply light, heat, and power to the town for the first time.

During the early part of the 1920s, an agreement was concluded between St. Albert and Edmonton for the latter's fire department to assist in putting out fires in St. Albert. This arrangement did not protect the town from a major fire in 1929 that gutted its downtown.

In 1930, Hogan presided over a meeting to found an Old Timers' Association of St. Albert. The organization floundered and quickly vanished. More successful were his efforts to raise funds for a community hall - fundraising efforts began in 1939 and the building was constructed by 1941.

Provincially, Hogan started out as a supporter of the United Farmers of Alberta under John Edward Brownlee, but subsequently became disillusioned with the party and joined the Liberal Party of Alberta. During the 1926 provincial election, he sought election as an independent Liberal in the riding of St. Albert against his old business partner Boudreau, who had secured the nomination for the Liberal Party (the incumbent UFA MLA, Télesphore St. Arnaud, was not seeking re-election). Boudreau defeated Hogan in the second count.

Hogan was a devoted member of the Knights of Columbus and the Edmonton Exhibition Association.

Michael Hogan was still mayor when he died on June 30, 1943.

== Family and legacy ==
Michael Hogan married Vera Rheaume in 1912. Their marriage produced a daughter, Evelyn, before Vera died of a stroke in 1917. Evelyn would go on to marry Eugene Perron, daughter of Fleuri Perron, St. Albert's first mayor.

Hogan subsequently married Blanche Escallier in 1919. The couple had three sons: John, Frank, and Leo. All served overseas during the Second World War; Frank was killed in action with the Royal Canadian Air Force.

Hogan Road in St. Albert is named in his honour.

Preceded by Alex Perron	Mayor of St. Albert; 1919–1943	Succeeded by Richard Poirier
