= Lucien Boudreau =

Canadian politician

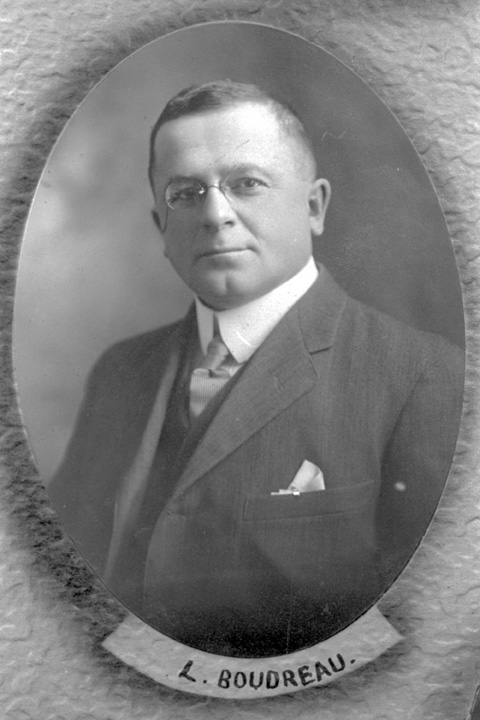

Member of the Legislative Assembly of Alberta
- In office March 22, 1909 – July 18, 1921
- Preceded by: Henry McKenney
- Succeeded by: Télesphore St. Arnaud
- Constituency: St. Albert
- In office June 28, 1926 – November 18, 1926
- Preceded by: Télesphore St. Arnaud
- In office December 8, 1926 – June 19, 1930
- Succeeded by: Omer St. Germain

Mayor of St. Albert
- In office 1909–1909
- Preceded by: Fleuri Perron
- Succeeded by: Herbert Dawson

Personal details
- Born: August 6, 1874 St-Gregoire de Nicolet, Quebec
- Died: December 16, 1962 (aged 88) St. Albert, Alberta
- Party: Liberal; Independent
- Occupation: politician

Lucien Boudreau (August 6, 1874 – December 16, 1962) was a politician, mayor of St. Albert, Alberta, and member of the Legislative Assembly of Alberta (then called the Provincial Parliament).

== Early life ==
Boudreau was born in St-Gregoire de Nicolet, Quebec in 1874. In 1893, he moved to Prince Albert, Saskatchewan, where he spent two years before moving to Alberta. He found employment as a clerk in a store in Strathcona (now part of Edmonton). Before long, he went into business himself, founding a real estate business that he sold in 1901 to Michael Hogan.

That same year, he married Marie Renault of St. Albert and became proprietor of the Astoria Hotel in that city. He ran this hotel until it burned down in 1912.

== Public service ==
When St. Albert was incorporated as a town in 1904, Boudreau was elected as a member of its first town council. He served in this capacity until 1908, when he was elected to serve as mayor during 1909.

In the meantime, he became interested in provincial politics. He ran for the Provincial Parliament in the 1905 election as the Alberta Liberal Party candidate, but was defeated by Henry William McKenney, who was running as an independent Liberal (the only other candidates were Arthur Guilbault and Wilfrid Gariépy, both of whom were also running as independent Liberals and both of whom withdrew before the election).

Before the ensuing election, boundary redistribution led to McKenney running in Pembina (where he was elected), freeing St. Albert up for Boudreau to run again. He was elected this time, defeating Gariépy (who was running as an independent Liberal after refusing to contest the Liberal nomination on the grounds that it was rigged in Boudreau's favour) and Conservative Omer St. Germain (who would leader represent the riding for the United Farmers of Alberta and Liberals). He was re-elected in 1913 and 1917, defeating Conservative candidate Hector Landry both times.

In 1916, Boudreau was the only member of the Provincial Parliament to vote against the Alberta Equal Suffrage Act, which granted women political rights, including the right to vote. He argued that "the place of women was in the home", that "the duty of women, dictated by Providence, was greater than that of men and if the time had come when it was necessary that the administration of the country should be shared by them it looked as if the men were becoming tired of their responsibility." He alleged that women who had signed petitions in favour of suffrage had done so "without knowing what it was all about," and expressed a hope that "though they were going to get the franchise...the women would do the best they could for its welfare without meddling in the public affairs of the province." For his performance, the Calgary Morning Albertan lauded him as "fearless champion of a lost cause" and suggested that he had voiced "sentiments which perhaps many of the present legislators felt but lacked the courage to make public." The paper further recorded that he was congratulated in private by many of his colleagues after his speech.

Federally, when many Liberals rushed to support Sir Robert Laird Borden's Union Government during the Conscription Crisis of 1917, Boudreau remained loyal to Sir Wilfrid Laurier's anti-conscription Liberal stub.

During the 1921 election, Boudreau was defeated by Télesphore St. Arnaud of the United Farmers of Alberta. He returned to office in 1926 (when St. Arnaud did not run), but was defeated again in 1930 by St. Germain, this time running for the UFA. Over the course of the next five years, St. Germain became disillusioned with the UFA, and crossed the floor to the Liberals, meaning that when Boudreau challenged him in the 1935 election, he had to do so as an independent Liberal trying to unseat the Liberal incumbent. He defeated St. Germain on the first ballot (Alberta used a single transferable vote electoral system at the time), but was defeated on the second by Lucien Maynard of the Alberta Social Credit Party. This was the end of Boudreau's political career.

Boudreau, who stood little over five feet tall, was given the nickname "the Little Napoleon of St. Albert" by Perrin Baker, minister of education in the cabinet of John Edward Brownlee.

== Family and legacy ==
Lucien Boudreau's brother, Rudolphe, was Secretary of the Privy Council under Sir Wilfrid Laurier. His sister-in-law, Alice Renault, was married to Boudreau's sometime electoral opponent Omer St. Germain. Lucien Boudreau died in 1962 in St. Albert and was interred at the St. Albert Cemetery.

Boudreau Road in St. Albert is named in his honour.
