= Len Bracko =

Canadian politician

Leon Bracko

Member of the Legislative Assembly of Alberta for St. Albert
- In office 1993–1997
- Preceded by: Dick Fowler
- Succeeded by: Mary O'Neill

Personal details
- Born: December 2, 1943 St. Albert, Alberta
- Died: August 19, 2017 (aged 73) Parksville, British Columbia
- Party: Alberta Liberal Party
- Spouse: Barb
- Occupation: teacher

Leonard Clarence Bracko (December 2, 1943 – August 19, 2017) was a Canadian politician. He was a city councillor for St. Albert City Council and a member of the Legislative Assembly of Alberta.

A high school social studies teacher by profession, Bracko first ran for the Legislative Assembly of Alberta in 1989 in the riding of St. Albert, under the banner of the Liberal Party. He finished second to Progressive Conservative Dick Fowler, a former mayor of St. Albert. Later that year, Bracko was elected to St. Albert City Council. He served one three-year term on it and then retired to run for the provincial legislature again.

In the 1993 provincial election, Bracko defeated Fowler, then the Minister of Justice and Attorney General, by 1,500 votes. As a member of the Liberal official opposition caucus, he served as Municipal Affairs critic. In the 1997 provincial election, he lost his seat to Progressive Conservative Mary O'Neill by sixteen votes in the election's closest race. He faced O'Neill again in the 2001 provincial election and lost by two thousand votes.

In 2001, Bracko returned to St. Albert City Council in that year's election. He was the only member of council to support the Ray Gibbon Drive alignment for the west regional road; the other members of council favoured the west bypass alignment that had earlier been rejected. In light of this, Bracko soon dropped his opposition to the bypass alignment. He was re-elected in 2004, 2007, and 2010.

Bracko and his wife, Barb, were active with Habitat for Humanity and travelled to Nepal in 2002 to help build houses. He was an honorary chief of the Maasai tribe, an honour that was bestowed on him in 2004 when he travelled to Mozambique on behalf of the Federation of Canadian Municipalities business.
