= Paul Chalifoux =

Canadian politician

Paul Chalifoux is a politician and the former mayor of St. Albert, Alberta. He served two terms as mayor, first one having taken place from 1998 to 2001 and the second from 2004 to 2007.

== Career ==
Chalifoux's first attempt at winning elected office was in the 1968 federal election, when he ran for the Liberal Party of Canada in the riding of Pembina. He finished a distant second to Progressive Conservative Jack Bigg.

Before serving as mayor, Chalifoux was a city alderman and the assistant principal of St. Albert Catholic High School. In 1998, he defeated three-term incumbent Anita Ratchinsky in an election whose major issue was the alignment of the proposed West Regional Road, which became Ray Gibbon Drive. Ratchinsky favoured a road that would bypass the developed portion of the city to the west by crossing the Sturgeon River close to the mouth of Big Lake, while Chalifoux supported an alignment that would cross the river further upstream.

During Chalifoux's time as mayor, the road remained St. Albert's most contentious political issue. City Council approved Chalifoux's preferred alignment, by this time named Ray Gibbon Drive. In the 2001 election, Chalifoux was defeated by former mayor Dr. Richard Plain, who favoured the same alignment as Ratchinsky and proposed a plebiscite on the subject.

Chalifoux challenged Plain again in 2004, campaigning this time on issues other than the road, saying that "it [was] time to move on". He won narrowly. On May 22, 2007, Chalifoux announced that he would not seek re-election (and, in so doing, provoke a third consecutive electoral battle against Plain) and would instead seek the nomination for the Progressive Conservatives in the next provincial election. Some perceived this as ironic given his past candidacy for the federal Liberals and given that he had inadvertently implicated the City of St. Albert in a minor scandal when he attended a fundraiser for the Alberta Liberal Party at the city's expense, which violated provincial law. Chalifoux acknowledges that he has been a member of the Liberal Party at both the provincial and federal levels at various points in his life, but claims that it has been more than a decade since his last provincial membership expired. He was defeated on the first ballot by former aldermanic colleague Ken Allred.

Chalifoux is a member of the Rotary Club.

Political offices
Preceded by Anita Ratchinsky	Mayor of St. Albert; 1998-2001	Succeeded by Richard Plain
Preceded by Richard Plain	Mayor of St. Albert; 2004-present	Succeeded by Incumbent
