= Ken Allred =

Canadian politician

George Kenneth (Ken) Allred MLA,

Member of the Legislative Assembly of Alberta for St. Albert
- In office 2008–2012
- Preceded by: Jack Flaherty
- Succeeded by: Stephen Khan

Alderman on the St. Albert City Council
- In office October 15, 1980 – October 20, 1986
- In office October 16, 1989 – October 26, 1998

Personal details
- Born: December 30, 1940 (age 85) Pincher Creek, Alberta
- Party: Progressive Conservative Association of Alberta
- Other political affiliations: Reform Party of Canada, Canadian Alliance
- Occupation: Land surveyor

George Kenneth (Ken) Allred (born December 30, 1940, in Pincher Creek, Alberta) is a politician in Alberta, Canada, who was a member of the Legislative Assembly of Alberta, in which he sat as a member of the Progressive Conservative caucus. He is also a former municipal councillor in St. Albert, Alberta and former candidate for the House of Commons of Canada.

== Background ==
Allred is a land surveyor by profession, and graduated from the Southern Alberta Institute of Technology in 1961. He was commissioned as an Alberta Land Surveyor in 1965 and as a Canada Lands Surveyor in 1968. He has held numerous positions with the Alberta Land Surveyors Association, the Canadian Council of Land Surveyors, and the International Federation of Surveyors (1981 until 2005), including serving as the Executive Director of the ALSA from 1977 until 1991. He was an adjunct professor at the University of Alberta from 1984 to 1992.

== Political career ==
Allred was first elected to St. Albert City Council in 1980, and was re-elected in 1983. He did not seek re-election in 1986, but returned to city council in 1989 and served an additional three terms, before retiring from municipal politics in 1998.

Federally, Allred was a charter member of the Reform Party of Canada in 1987, and was that party's candidate in the 1988 federal election for the riding of St. Albert. He finished fourth as incumbent Progressive Conservative Walter van de Walle was re-elected. Allred's Liberal opponent in that race was Kent Davidson, with whom he would later serve on city council. Allred was also President of the Reform Party constituency association from 1987 to 1988, and later a director of the Canadian Alliance constituency association from 2001 until 2003.

Provincially, Allred is a supporter of the Progressive Conservative Party, and served as a director of its St. Albert constituency association from 1986 to 1988 and as its President from 2000 until 2003. In June 2007, Allred announced his intention to seek the Progressive Conservative nomination in the riding, challenging incumbent mayor Paul Chalifoux and local seniors activist Frances Badrock. He won a first ballot victory by a "significant margin" and became the party's choice to challenge incumbent Liberal MLA Jack Flaherty in the 2008 election. He defeated Flaherty by nearly three thousand votes to take office as MLA.

== Personal life ==
Ken Allred is married with three sons. He is a former president of the Australian Wine Club of Edmonton.
