= List of mayors of St. Albert, Alberta =

List of St. Albert mayors :

- Cheri Hebert (1904–1907)
- Fleuri Perron (1908)
- Lucien Boudreau (1909)
- Herbert B. Dawson (1910)
- Leon Levasseur (1911–1912)
- J. Arthur Giroux (1913–1918)
- Alex Perron (1918–1919)
- Michael Hogan (1919–1943)
- Richard Poirier (1943–1945)
- John LeClair (1945–1946)
- Eugene Maheux (1946–1947)
- Neil M. Ross (1947–1951)
- William Veness (1951–1957)
- 1957–1962: None, designated a New Town, run by a Board of Administrators
- William Veness (1962–1965)
- John de Bruijn (1965)
- Dick Fowler (1965–1968)
- Ray Gibbon (1968–1974)
- Richard Plain (1974–1977)
- Ronald Harvey (1977–1980)
- Dick Fowler (1980–1989)
- Ray Gibbon (1989)
- Anita Ratchinsky (1989–1998)
- Paul Chalifoux (1998–2001)
- Richard Plain (2001–2004)
- Paul Chalifoux (2004–2007)
- Nolan Crouse (2007–2017)
- Cathy Heron (2017–2025)
- Scott Olivieri (2025-present)
