= Villeneuve, Alberta =

Villeneuve
- Hamlet
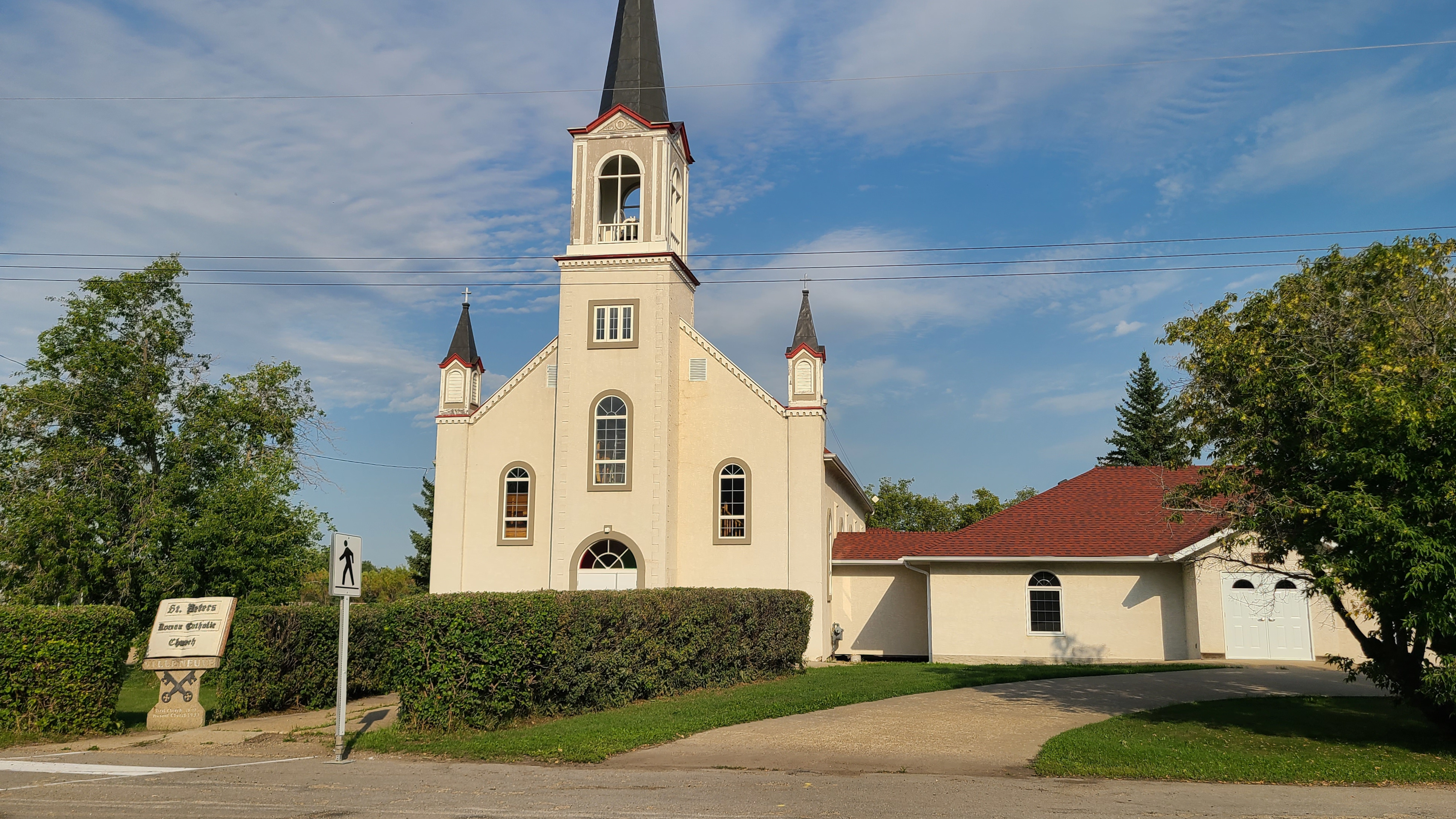
- St. Peters Roman Catholic Church in Villeneuve

- Location within Sturgeon County Location within Alberta
- Coordinates: 53°39′29″N 113°48′43″W
- Country: Canada
- Province: Alberta
- Region: Central Alberta
- Municipal district: Sturgeon County

Government
  - Type: Unincorporated

Area (2021)
  - Land: 0.33 km^{2} (0.13 sq mi)

Population (2021)
  - Total: 260
  - Density: 787.2/km^{2} (2,039/sq mi)
- Time zone: UTC−06:00 (Alberta Time)
- Postal code: T8T 0E2
- Area codes: 780, 587
- Highways: Highway 44; Highway 633

Villeneuve is a hamlet in central Alberta, Canada within Sturgeon County. It is located on Highway 44, approximately 10 kilometres (6.2 mi) northwest of Edmonton's city limits. It is home to the band government of the Michel First Nations.

== Toponymy ==
Villeneuve is named for Frederic Villeneuve (sometimes recorded as Frederick), who served one term as St. Albert's member of the North-West Legislative Assembly between 1898 and 1902. The surname Villeneuve was well-represented among early settlers to Alberta.

== History ==
=== Pre-settlement ===
Prior to the Canadian government's expansion into Western Canada, the area now known as Villeneuve was populated by Iroquois and Cree groups. They united under Chief Michel Calihoo, who signed Treaty 6 with Crown representatives in 1878, and became known as the Michel Band. The band, which initially received a reserve of 25,000 acres, would become the only band in Canada to be dissolved through involuntary enfranchisement, losing its territories and official status by 1958.

=== Settlement: 1890-1899 ===
In the late 1800s, under the direction of Vital-Justin Grandin, the Missionary Oblates of Mary Immaculate campaigned to bring hundreds of French, Catholic to Western Canada.

Settlers first arrived in the area today known as Villeneuve in 1891, and a school opened to serve the area four years later. The locality was originally named St. Pierre by Archbishop Émile-Joseph Legal, who established a church of that name in the area in 1897.

=== Villeneuve: 1900-1940 ===
The settlement's name changed to Villeneuve in 1900, when it received a post office named for politician Frederic Villeneuve. A general store opened shortly afterwards.

By 1906, the Edmonton–Slave Lake railway line, eventually operated by the Canadian National Railway, was active a mile north of Villeneuve. The introduction of a train brought three grain elevators to the hamlet.

A new church was built in 1910 to accommodate Villeneuve's growing parish, as was a school within the town site named Turcotte School. Villeneuve's church closed briefly between 1934 and 1935 as repairs were undertaken following a fire.

=== Later developments: 1941-1999 ===
In 1948, a new two-room schoolhouse, Villeneuve School, opened to serve the hamlet. Extensive renovation work to the church, spearheaded by Father Peter O’Neil throughout the 1950s, saw the place of worship renamed to St. Peter's Church. Villeneuve School closed around 1964, and students were transported to St. Albert for their education instead.

Throughout the 1970s, Villeneuve's post office and grain elevators closed, and train services to the hamlet ended. Nonetheless, Villeneuve Community Hall opened by 1974, and a flight training site established by Transport Canada began operating in 1975. The original Turcotte School, which had been in use as a barn, was demolished in 1983.

=== Recent activity: 2000-present ===
In 2000, Edmonton Airports purchased Villeneuve Airport. When Edmonton City Centre Airport closed in 2013, Villeneuve was used for a time to handle overflow; its airport received a new 5,000-foot runway. Later that year, the Alberta Aviation Museum announced plans to open a Villeneuve location, which would host a vintage Boeing 737. The plane was flown into Villeneuve in November. The museum ultimately did not come to fruition, with its website defunct by 2015, but the 737 remains grounded in a field in Villeneuve as of 2025.

Between 2015 and 2023, Villeneuve hosted the annual Alberta International Airshow. In late 2025, Sturgeon Public Schools announced that Villeneuve Airport will host the first high school aviation program offered in the Edmonton area.

In early 2026, consultations began with Sturgeon County and Villeneuve residents concerning the potential introduction of a 1,600 acre solar farm near the hamlet. The installation, proposed by Canwest Solar Development Corp and investment firm Starlight, would administer 373,000 solar panels and expand the local power grid.

== Demographics ==
In the 2021 Census of Population conducted by Statistics Canada, Villeneuve had a population of 260 living in 54 of its 56 total private dwellings, a change of 9.2% from its 2016 population of 238. With a land area of 0.33 km^{2} (0.13 sq mi), it had a population density of 787.9/km^{2} (2,040.6/sq mi) in 2021.

As a designated place in the 2016 Census of Population conducted by Statistics Canada, Villeneuve had a population of 153 living in 54 of its 55 total private dwellings, a change of 12.5% from its 2011 population of 136. With a land area of 0.31 km^{2} (0.12 sq mi), it had a population density of 493.5/km^{2} (1,278.3/sq mi) in 2016.

== Amenities ==
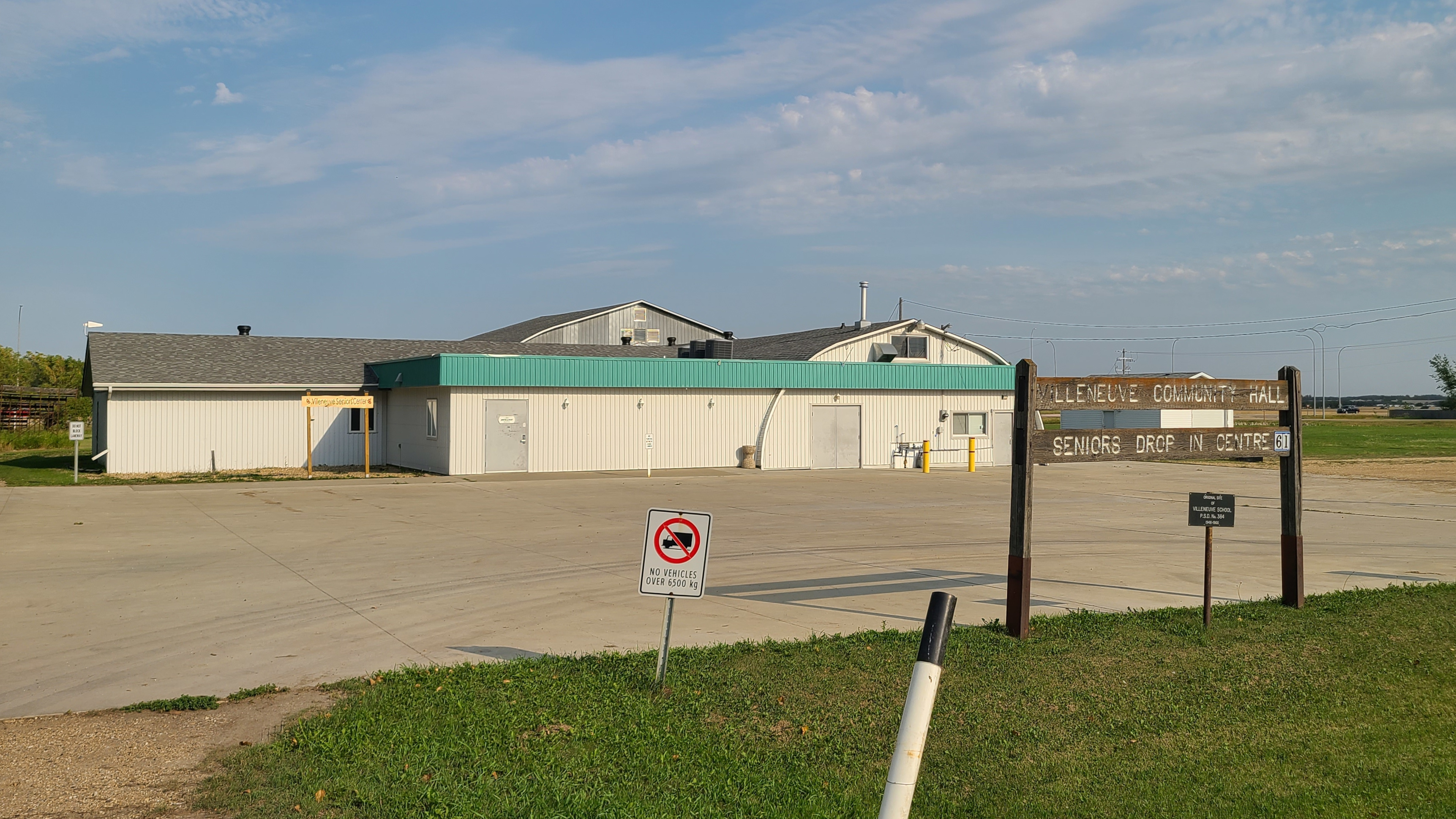
Villeneuve Community Hall, original site of Villeneuve School (pictured 2024).

Villeneuve Community Hall provides venue rental services and events as of 2026. The hamlet also hosts softball facilities for outdoor recreation.

West Country Hearth operates a senior living location in Villeneuve.

=== Places of worship ===
St. Peter Catholic Church is administered through the Archdiocese of Edmonton. Volunteers maintain its graveyard, which contains over 300 graves as of 2019.

== Transportation ==
Villeneuve Airport serves the community.

== Notable residents ==
- Walter van de Walle (1922 – 2011), politician, born in Villeneuve
- Colleen Soetaert – provincial politician, long-time resident of Villeneuve

== See also ==
- List of communities in Alberta
- List of designated places in Alberta
- List of hamlets in Alberta
