= Richard Plain =

Canadian politician

Richard Plain (born 1939 or 1940) is a Canadian politician. Plain is the former mayor of St. Albert, Alberta, having served from 1974 to 1977 and again from 2001 to 2004. In February 2007, he announced that he would seek a third term as mayor in the 2007 election.

By profession, Plain is a health economist; he retired from the University of Alberta in 2001. In this capacity, he has been critical of several health care initiatives of the Alberta government headed by Ralph Klein. These have included Bill 11 (the 1997 government bill to expand the private sector's role in delivering publicly insured health services), the 2002 report by former Canadian Deputy Prime Minister Don Mazankowski, and the abortive "third way" plan to change the mix of public and private health care delivery.

Plain was elected mayor in 1974, defeating incumbent Ray Gibbon in an election that was fought primarily on issues of development, with Plain favouring stricter limits than Gibbons. He was defeated three years later by Ronald Harvey. Plain blamed his defeat on Harvey's friendship with then-MLA Ernie Jamison, who also owned the St. Albert Gazette, and called his defeat "a plague on our house".

Between 1979 and 1981, as chair of the St. Albert Citizens Committee, Plain led the fight against a proposal from Edmonton to annex St. Albert, which he called "one of the greatest things this community will ever see".

In 2001, Plain, newly retired from academia, announced his intention to challenge incumbent mayor Paul Chalifoux. The ensuing election was fought largely on the issue of the West Regional Road, with Chalifoux favouring the recently proposed Ray Gibbon Drive alignment. Plain preferred the previously proposed alignment, which bypassed the developed portion of the city but crossed the Sturgeon River close to the mouth of Big Lake, and proposed a plebiscite on the subject. An aggressive public relations campaign by the Riel Park Business Association, which did not like the way the proposed road would pass through Riel Business Park, and a group calling itself S.E.N.S.I.B.L.E. Choice, attacked the alignment. Plain received the endorsement from S.E.N.S.I.B.L.E. Choice and he, along with the five aldermanic candidates the group endorsed, was elected.

Plain's second term as mayor was dominated by four issues. Plain's favoured plebiscite on the road was rejected by a majority of Council in favour of proceeding immediately with the original alignment. Plain quickly fell into step with this majority view, and was criticized for it by many citizens who continued to favour the rejected Ray Gibbon Drive alignment. In addition, Plain opposed the agreement made by the Chalifoux Council to split tax revenues from land recently annexed from Sturgeon County with the County, claiming that St. Albert would require all of the tax revenues in order to service the land. This position put him at odds with Sturgeon County mayor Lawrence Kluthe, and a feud developed between the two. Third, Plain oversaw preliminary plans for the development of the multi-purpose leisure centre that would eventually become Servus Credit Union Place. Fourth and finally, Plain's Council brought in a bylaw prohibiting smoking in all places of business, including those open only to adults.

Chalifoux ran again in 2004 and, in an election dominated by a bitter dispute over how to deal with Sturgeon County, narrowly defeated Plain. Since his defeat, Plain has continued to comment publicly on issues including St. Albert's annexation of land from Sturgeon County and municipal budgeting, and has announced that he intends to run for mayor again in 2007.

Plain was named St. Albert's 1981 Citizen of the Year.

Preceded by Ray Gibbon	Mayor of St. Albert; 1974-1977	Succeeded by Ronald Harvey
Preceded by Paul Chalifoux	Mayor of St. Albert; 2001-2004	Succeeded by Paul Chalifoux
