= Alberta Highway 633 =

Provincial highway in Alberta, Canada

Highway 633
- Villeneuve Road
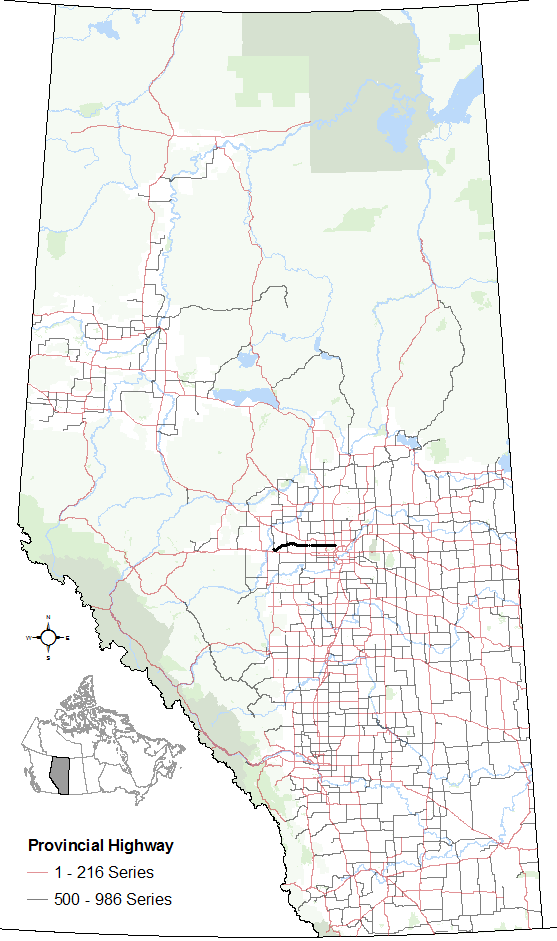

Route information
- Maintained by Alberta Transportation
- Length: 85.8 km (53.3 mi)

Major junctions
- West end: Highway 757 near Gainford
- Highway 43 near Onoway; Highway 44 in Villeneuve
- East end: Ray Gibbon Drive in St. Albert

Location
- Country: Canada
- Province: Alberta
- Specialized and rural municipalities: Parkland County, Lac Ste. Anne County, Sturgeon County
- Major cities: St. Albert

Highway system
- Alberta Provincial Highway Network; List; Former
← Highway 631	→ Highway 640

Highway 633 is a highway in the province of Alberta, Canada. It runs west–east from Highway 757, about 2.5 kilometres (1.6 mi) north of Highway 16, to Ray Gibbon Drive in St. Albert. It formerly extended to Highway 2 (St. Albert Trail) in St. Albert; however the 2.5-kilometre (1.6 mi) section was decommissioned in the 2020s. It runs through the summer villages on the north side of Isle Lake, and the south side of Lac Ste. Anne. It is also known as Villeneuve Road between Villeneuve and St. Albert.

An 8-kilometre (5 mi) section of Highway 633 between Alberta Beach and Highway 43 was formerly designated as Highway 33; in c. 1985, the section became part of Highway 633.

== Major intersections ==
Rural/specialized municipality	Location	km	mi	Destinations	Notes
Parkland County		0.0	0.0	Highway 727 to Highway 16 (TCH) / Township Road 534A – Sangudo	Western terminus
Lac Ste. Anne County	Lake Isle	11.7	7.3	Range Road 55	
Lac Ste. Anne County	Darwell	20.6	12.8	Highway 765 – Cherhill, Fallis	
Lac Ste. Anne County		38.6	24.0	Range Road 32 – Alberta Beach	West end of former Highway 33
Lac Ste. Anne County		46.6	29.0	Highway 43 – Grande Prairie, Edmonton	East end of former Highway 33
Sturgeon County		64.4	40.0	Highway 779 – Calahoo, Stony Plain	
Sturgeon County	Villeneuve	77.1	47.9	Highway 44 – Westlock, Edmonton	
City of St. Albert		85.8	53.3	Ray Gibbon Drive	Eastern terminus
City of St. Albert		89.0	55.3	St. Albert Trail (Highway 2) / Erin Ridge Road	Former eastern terminus
1.000 mi = 1.609 km; 1.000 km = 0.621 mi: Closed/former

== See also ==
- List of Alberta provincial highways
