= Ray Gibbon =

Canadian politician

Ray M. Gibbon (c. 1926 – October 16, 1999) is a former mayor of St. Albert, Alberta, having served in this capacity from 1968 to 1974, and briefly again in 1989.

By profession, Gibbon was a contract life insurance agent. He also served in the Royal Canadian Navy during World War II.

Gibbon ran for St. Albert Town Council in 1964, and was defeated. However, he challenged the result in court, alleging that the polling stations were not able to properly conduct their function and that many voters were improperly turned away. In response, the Alberta Court of Queen's Bench ordered new elections to be held. These took place in 1965, and Gibbon was elected to Council.

Three years later, Gibbon was elected to mayor, an office he occupied until being defeated in 1974 by Richard Plain, who accused Gibbon of fostering an environment of unconstrained municipal growth. In 1969 Gibbon joined the executive of the Alberta Urban Municipalities Association, serving as vice president from 1973 to 1974. Following his defeat, he served on the board of directors of the St. Albert Chamber of Commerce for ten years, and served as its president in 1983. In 1977, he announced his intention to challenge incumbent MLA Ernie Jamison for the provincial Progressive Conservative nomination in the 1979 general election, but was unsuccessful. This was his second time challenging Jamison for the nomination; he had also been defeated in 1971.

In 1984, Gibbon made a return to municipal office by being elected alderman. Re-elected in 1986, he served as interim mayor for seven months in 1989, following the resignation of Dick Fowler to run in the 1989 provincial election. However, Gibbon elected not to run for mayor in the 1989 municipal election, and was instead elected to another term as alderman. He did not run for re-election in 1992.

Ray Gibbon Drive, a road proposed during the St. Albert West Regional Road Debate, was named in his honour. Eventually the road was constructed, but not with the original alignment.

Ray Gibbon died October 16, 1999, of a cancerous brain tumor.

Preceded by Dick Fowler	Mayor of St. Albert; 1968-1974	Succeeded by Richard Plain
Preceded by Dick Fowler	Mayor of St. Albert; 1989	Succeeded by Anita Ratchinsky
