= Rivière Qui Barre (river) =

Watercourse in Alberta, Canada

Coordinates: 53°42′49″N 113°51′06″W

Rivière Qui Barre is a river in Central Alberta, Canada. The name is a translation, by early French-speaking settlers, of Keepootakawa (“river that bars the way”), the Cree name for the river.

== Course ==
Through sections of its course, Rivière Qui Barre is little more than a stream. The river starts near Busby, flows through a number of small lakes in the Alexander Indian Reserve, passes near the hamlet of Rivière Qui Barre, and eventually empties into the Sturgeon River.

== Tributaries ==
- Deadman Lake, Alberta
- Bard Lake, Alberta
- Low Water Lake, Alberta
