= Dick Fowler (politician) =

Canadian politician

Richard Fowler

Member of the Legislative Assembly of Alberta for St. Albert
- In office 1989–1993
- Preceded by: Bryan Strong
- Succeeded by: Len Bracko

Personal details
- Born: April 12, 1932 Edson, Alberta
- Died: July 8, 2012 (aged 80) Alberta, Canada
- Party: Progressive Conservative Association of Alberta

Richard S. Fowler (April 12, 1932 – July 8, 2012) was a member of the Legislative Assembly of Alberta, Minister of the Crown in the Government of Alberta, mayor of St. Albert, Alberta, and Judge of the Provincial Court of Alberta.

Fowler was first elected mayor of St. Albert in 1965, and served a single term. He did not seek re-election in 1968. He returned to office in 1980 by acclamation to replace the retiring Ronald Harvey. He was acclaimed again in 1983 and re-elected in 1986 with nearly seventy percent of the vote. He resigned in 1989, months before the end of his third term, to run as the Progressive Conservative candidate in the 1989 provincial election in St. Albert.

Incumbent New Democrat Bryan Strong was not seeking re-election, and Fowler defeated his closest challenger, Liberal Len Bracko, by more than two thousand votes. He was appointed Solicitor General by Premier Don Getty and served as such until February 1992, when Getty appointed him to the portfolios of Municipal Affairs and Native Affairs. When Ralph Klein became Premier in December 1992, Fowler was named Minister of Justice and Attorney General. He was defeated by Bracko in the 1993 election.

Fowler also served as justice of the Provincial Court of Alberta.

Richard S. Fowler Junior High School in St. Albert is named in his honour. Fowler died on July 8, 2012.

Legislative Assembly of Alberta
Preceded by Bryan Strong	MLA St. Albert; 1989-1993	Succeeded by Len Bracko
Political offices
Preceded by William Veness	Mayor of St. Albert; 1965-1968	Succeeded by Ray Gibbon
Preceded by Ronald Harvey	Mayor of St. Albert; 1980-1989	Succeeded by Ray Gibbon
