= John LeClair (politician) =

Canadian politician

John E. LeClair (1893–1968) was a Canadian politician, who served as the 10th mayor of St. Albert, Alberta from February 1945 to May 1946. Born in St. Boniface, Manitoba, he and his family moved to Lily Lake, Alberta in childhood.

Leclair met his wife Sarah Healey in nearby Rochester, Alberta, where he began employment as an auctioneer. The couple resided in Lily Lake before moving to Legal. As their home expanded to include six children, in 1939 the family moved to St. Albert. Their first home was on the east side of St. Albert Trail, just north of the Sturgeon River.

He was actively involved in the community as a Justice of the Peace and Commissioner of Oaths. To his friends, and all who knew him, he was affectionately known as "Jack." He and his children provided groceries for needy families. After his term as mayor, he lived in St. Albert until he died in 1968.

In honour of his commitment to St. Albert and his time as mayor, the city council has named the 137 Avenue extension Leclair Way in his honour.
