= St. Albert Grain Elevator Park =

Museum in Alberta, Canada

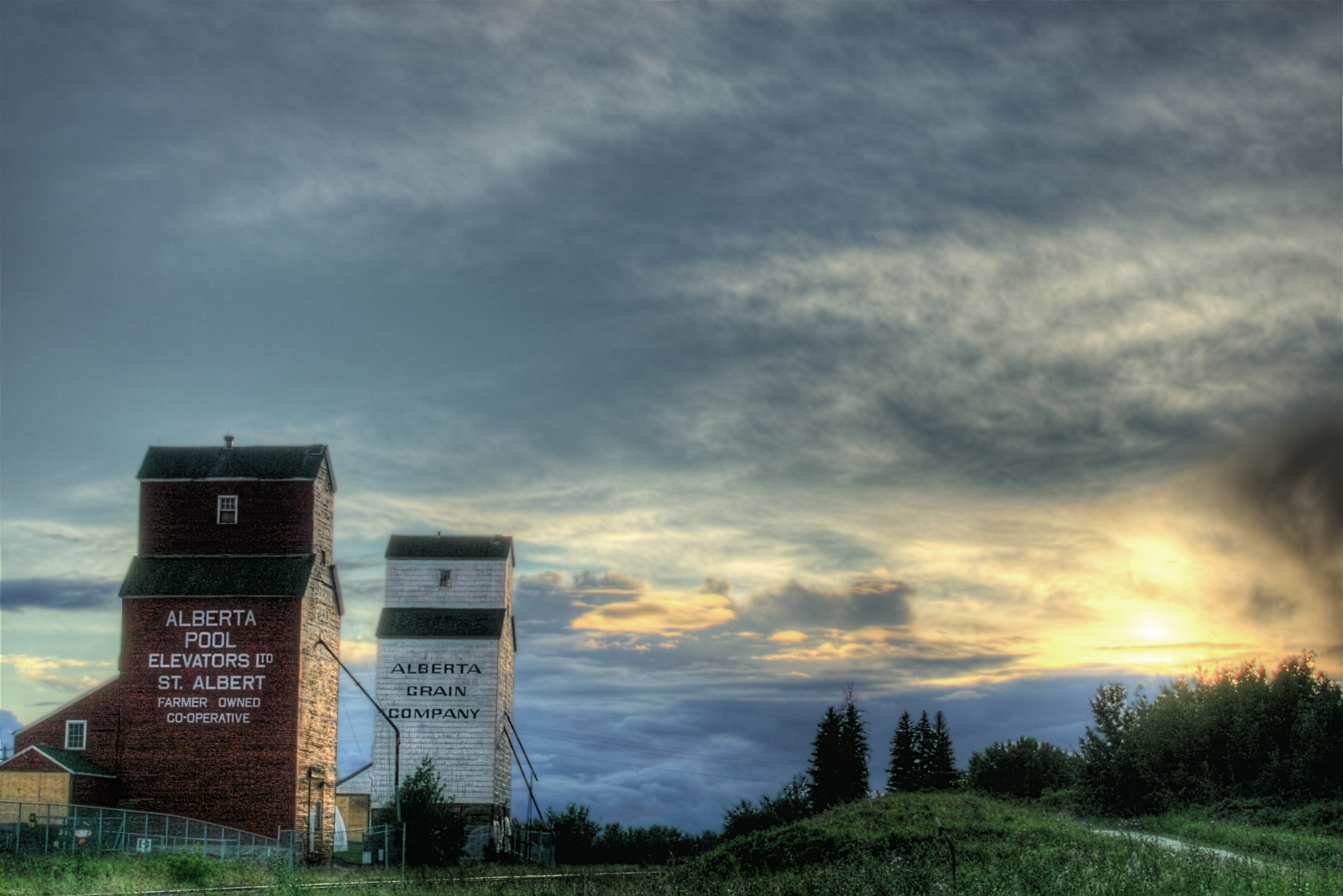
- The grain elevators in 2010, prior to their restoration.
- Established: 2005
- Location: St. Albert, Alberta, Canada
- Coordinates: 53.63313°N 113.64089°W
- Type: open-air, agricultural history, railway history
- Website: St. Albert Grain Elevator Park

St. Albert Grain Elevator Park is an open-air museum which features two historic grain elevators and a reconstructed railway station.

The two elevators are a 1906 Brackman-Ker Milling Company Elevator and a 1929 Alberta Wheat Pool Elevator, both which were designated as Provincial Historic Resources in January 2007. The park also features the St. Albert Railway Station and Visitor Centre, a replica of the former 1909 St. Albert Canadian Northern Railway railway station, built in 2005.

The museum is operated by the Arts & Heritage Foundation of St. Albert. Guided tours of the Grain Elevators and Railway Station are available from May to September.

== Restoration ==
St. Albert's 1906 and 1929 Albert Wheat Pool Elevators were constructed in the golden age of Canada's grain trade.

The grain elevators reopened to the public in 2011 after a year-long restoration. The restoration project included repairs and stabilization of the foundations, roofs re-shingled, metal cladding secured and repainted, rotten timbers replaced and windows restored. Work continued into 2011 on the 1929 elevator, which had considerable more rot then the 1906 elevator, included residing and repainting the elevators with the Alberta Wheat Pool colour and logo. Throughout the project, the City of St. Albert, Arts and Heritage, HIP architects and Delnor Construction worked closely with the Provincial Heritage Advisor to ensure all restoration work complied with the Standards and Guidelines for the Preservation of Historic Places in Canada.

== See also ==
- List of museums in Alberta
- Grain elevator
