= Rivière Qui Barre =

Hamlet in Alberta

Riviere Qui Barre
- Hamlet
- Location of Riviere Qui Barre Riviere Qui Barre (Canada)
- Coordinates: 53°46′29″N 113°50′36″W
- Country: Canada
- Province: Alberta
- Region: Edmonton Metropolitan Region
- Census division: 11
- Municipal district: Sturgeon County

Government
  - Type: Unincorporated
  - Governing body: Sturgeon County Council

Area (2021)
  - Land: 0.58 km^{2} (0.22 sq mi)

Population (2021)
  - Total: 91
  - Density: 155.6/km^{2} (403/sq mi)
- Time zone: UTC−06:00 (Alberta Time)
- Area codes: 780, 587, 825

Rivière Qui Barre is a hamlet in central Alberta, Canada, within Sturgeon County. It is located 1 kilometre (0.62 mi) west of Highway 44, approximately 22 kilometres (14 mi) northwest of Edmonton's city limits. It was founded in 1885 by French-speaking settlers, adding a post office in 1895. The name is the French translation of Kipohtakaw (“river that bars the way”), the Cree name of the nearby river.

== Demographics ==
In the 2021 Census of Population conducted by Statistics Canada, Rivière Qui Barre had a population of 91 living in 36 of its 37 total private dwellings, a change of 506.7% from its 2016 population of 15. With a land area of 0.58 km^{2} (0.22 sq mi), it had a population density of 156.9/km^{2} (406.4/sq mi) in 2021.

As a designated place in the 2016 Census of Population conducted by Statistics Canada, Rivière Qui Barre had a population of 15 living in 4 of its 6 total private dwellings. With a land area of 0.58 km^{2} (0.22 sq mi), it had a population density of 25.9/km^{2} (67.0/sq mi) in 2016.

== Services ==
While the hamlet of Rivière Qui Barre has only 91 people, it is a recreation and education center for this part of Sturgeon County.

The Rivière Qui Barre Arena provides an indoor ice hockey venue for the area. In January 2017, the Government of Canada announced that the arena's operator, the Rivière Qui Barre Agricultural Society, would receive a $200,000 grant for upgrades as part of a series of infrastructure projects celebrating the 150th anniversary of Canada becoming a nation. In March 2017, Sturgeon County added a further $100,000 grant for the renovations.

The Sturgeon School Division operates Camilla School in Rivière Qui Barre, serving 470 elementary and junior high students from the region in the 2016–17 school year. In March 2017, the Alberta Minister of Education announced that a new Camilla School will be built by 2021, replacing the structure built in 1954.

== See also ==
- List of communities in Alberta
- List of hamlets in Alberta
