= Alberta Flying Heritage Museum =

- Location in Alberta
- Location: Villeneuve Airport, Sturgeon County, Alberta
- Coordinates: 53°39′41″N 113°51′48″W
- Type: Aviation museum

The Alberta Flying Heritage Museum was a proposed aviation museum to be built at Villeneuve Airport in Sturgeon County, Alberta, Canada. It was intended to supplement the Alberta Aviation Museum collection in the City of Edmonton as a result of the closure of the Edmonton City Centre Airport.

== Development ==
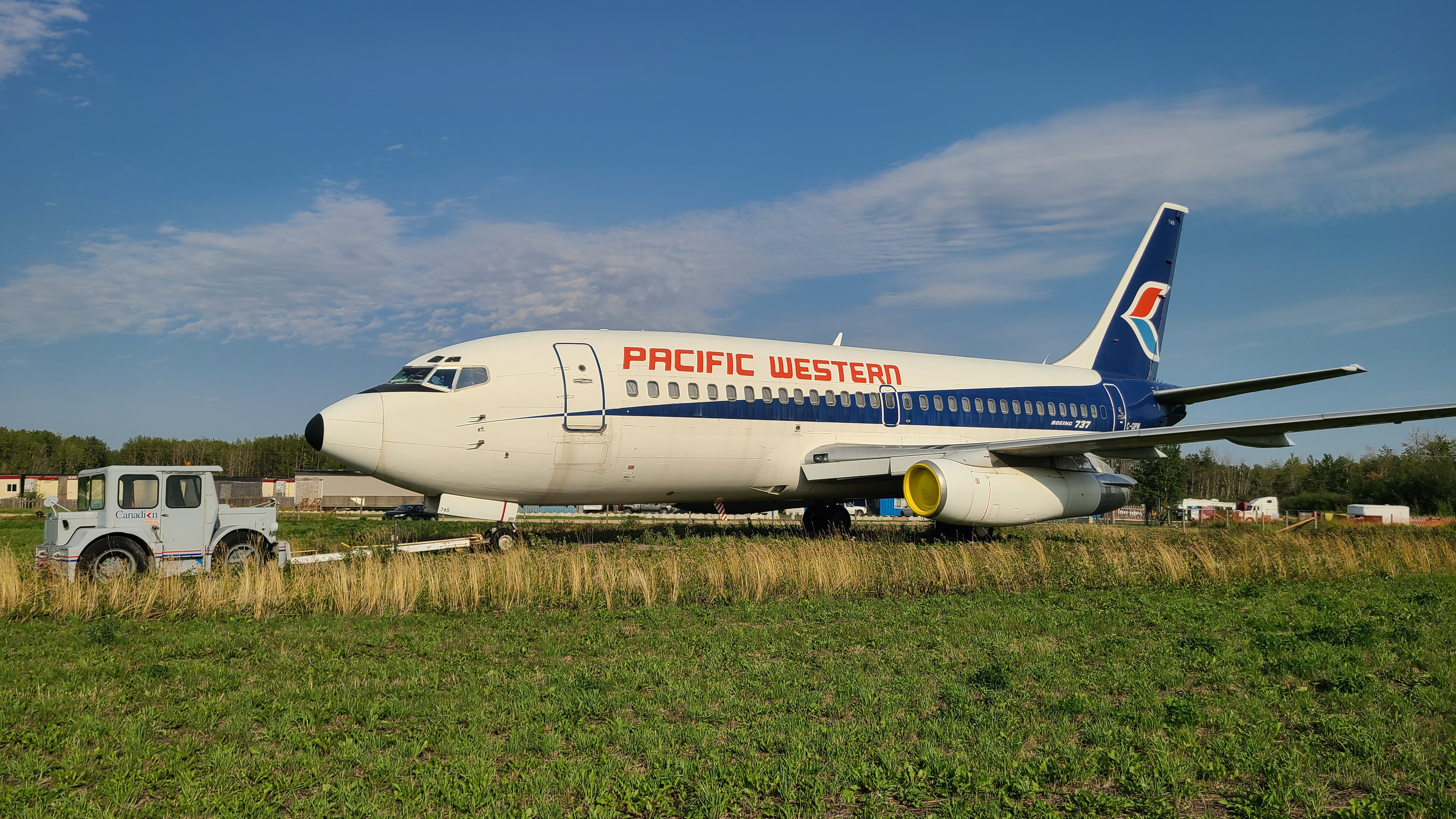
Boeing 737-200 at Villeneuve Airport

The museum was officially announced by the Alberta Aviation Museum on 16 November 2013, days before the closure of the City Centre Airport. In the years following, plans were not pursued, and the website was no longer available in 2015.

As part of the museum, the Alberta Aviation Museum's Boeing 737-200, ident C-GIPW, in Pacific Western Airlines (PWA) livery (Fleet #745) was restored to operational capability and, on 29 November 2013, was flown to Villeneuve on a Schedule A Special Flight Permit issued by Transport Canada. The Boeing 737-200 remains at Villeneuve and is a ground attraction during the Alberta International Airshow.
