= National Women's Liberal Commission =

The National Women's Liberal Commission is the women's wing of the Liberal Party of Canada. Its National Chair, since April 2021, is Alicia S. Natividad. It traces its origins to the National Federation of Liberal Women of Canada in 1928. The commission promotes the equal participation and representation of women in all levels of the Liberal Party of Canada.
