= Villeneuve Airport =

Edmonton/Villeneuve Airport Villeneuve Airport
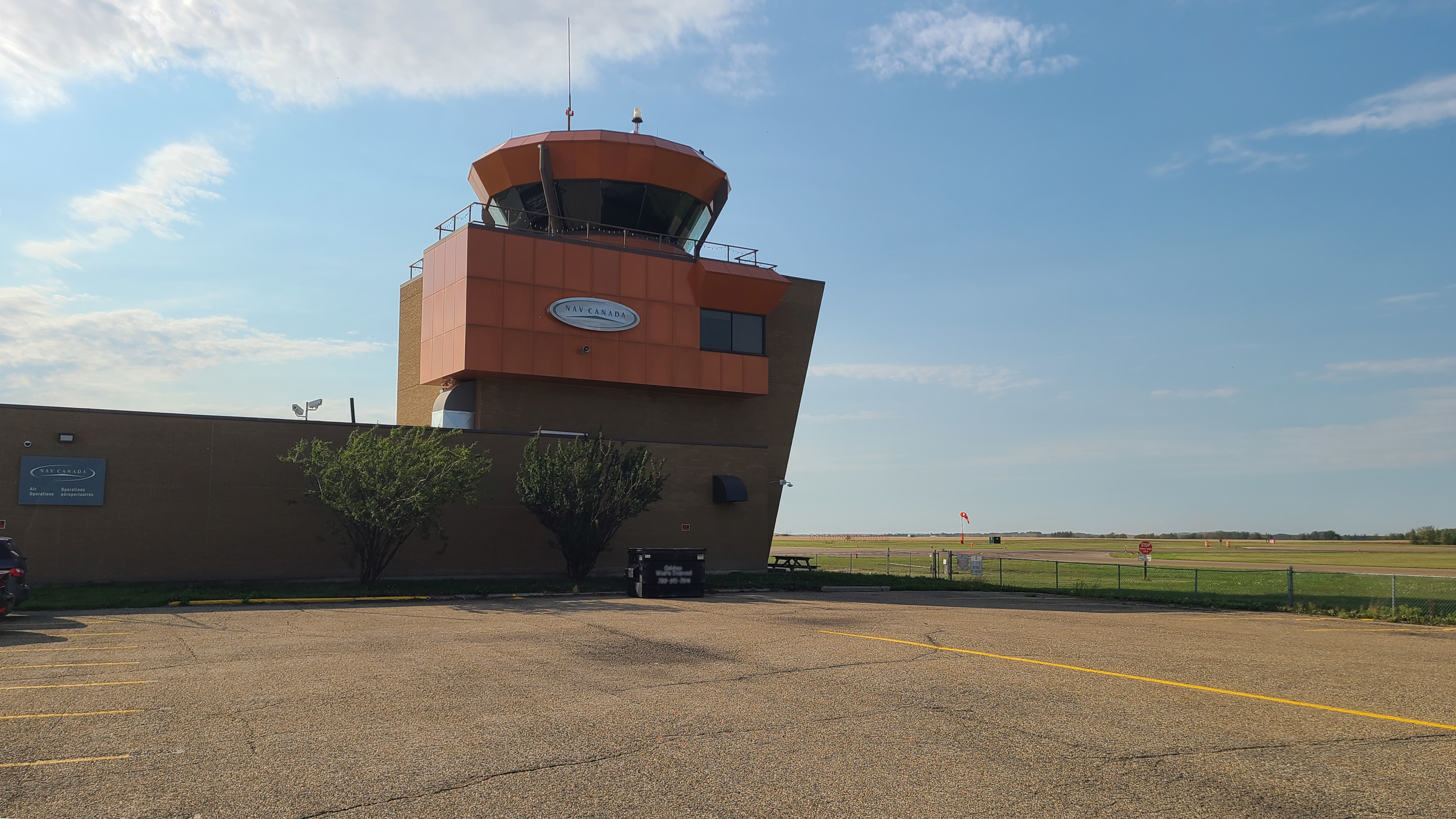
- IATA: none; ICAO: CZVL

Summary
- Airport type: Public
- Owner/Operator: Edmonton Airports
- Serves: Edmonton Metropolitan Region
- Location: Sturgeon County, near Villeneuve, Alberta
- Opened: 1976
- Time zone: Alberta Time (UTC−06:00)
- Elevation AMSL: 2,256 ft (688 m)
- Coordinates: 53°40′06″N 113°51′08″W
- Website: flyeia.com/villeneuve/

Map
- Location in Alberta CZVL (Sturgeon County)

Runways
| Direction | Length | | Surface |
| Direction | ft | m | Surface |
|---|---|---|---|
| 08/26 | 5,001 | 1,524 | Asphalt |
| 16/34 | 3,496 | 1,066 | Asphalt |

Statistics (2018)
- Aircraft movements: 72,669
- Sources: Canada Flight Supplement; Movements from Statistics Canada

Villeneuve Airport, officially Edmonton/Villeneuve Airport, (ICAO: CZVL, also abbreviated ZVL) is located 1.5 nautical miles (2.8 km; 1.7 mi) west of Villeneuve in Sturgeon County, Alberta, Canada.

== History ==
The airport opened in 1976, and was built by Transport Canada as a flight training facility. In 2000 the airport was purchased by Edmonton Airports.

=== Expansion ===
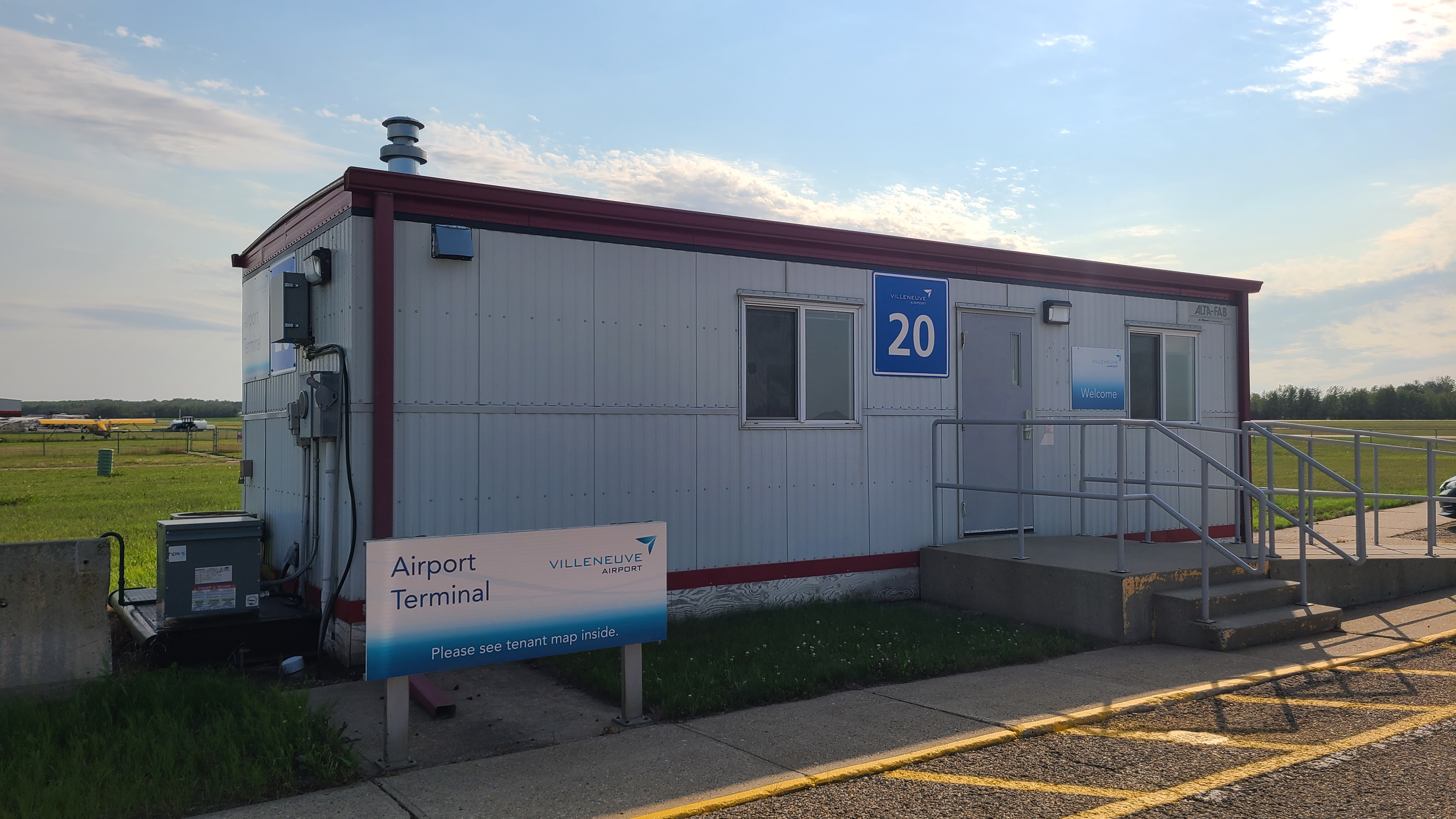
Terminal building in 2024

The closure of the Edmonton City Centre Airport in 2013 stimulated expansion of the Villeneuve Airport as a partial replacement. Its land base grew from 1,400 to 1,555 acres (5.67 to 6.29 km^{2}), the instrument landing system was upgraded, the number of hangars increased, and one runway was extended to 5,001 ft (1,524 m). Villeneuve serves as an alternate to the Edmonton International Airport for medevac flights during stormy weather.

=== Alberta Aviation Museum presence ===
Due to space constraints at the former City Centre Airport site, the Alberta Aviation Museum's Boeing 737-200 in Pacific Western Airlines livery C-GIPW (Fleet #745) was restored to operational capability and, on 29 November 2013, was flown to Villeneuve. The 737 was to be the beginning of the Alberta Flying Heritage Museum, however plans were not pursued.

== Alberta International Airshow ==
The two-day Alberta International Airshow, originally Edmonton Airshow, has operated annually at Villeneuve Airport from 2015 to 2024. The airshow features military and civilian static displays, and Canadian and international aerial displays. It attracts tens of thousands of visitors a year.

== See also ==
- List of airports in the Edmonton Metropolitan Region
