= Isle Lake (Alberta) =

Lake in Alberta, Canada

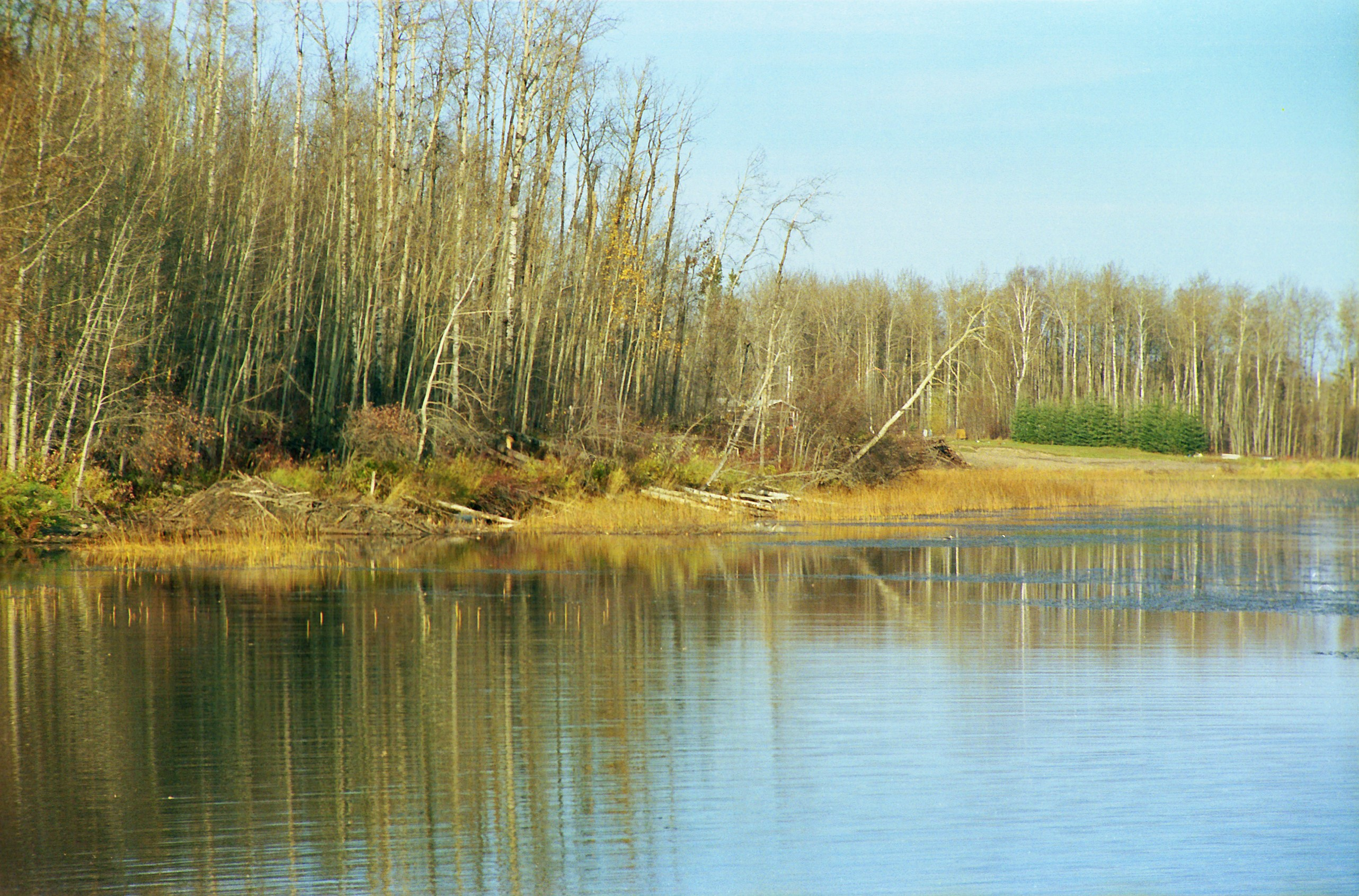
- Isle Lake in 1986

- Location within Alberta
- Location: Parkland County / Lac Ste. Anne County, Alberta
- Coordinates: 53°37′35″N 114°43′41″W
- Primary inflows: Sturgeon River
- Primary outflows: Sturgeon River
- Catchment area: North Saskatchewan River
- Basin countries: Canada
- Max. length: 2.6 km (1.6 mi)
- Max. width: 11.2 km (7.0 mi)
- Surface area: 23.0 km^{2} (8.9 sq mi)
- Average depth: 4.1 m (13 ft)
- Max. depth: 7.5 m (25 ft)
- Surface elevation: 730 m (2,400 ft)
- References: Isle Lake

Isle Lake (also called Lake Isle) is a medium-sized lake in central Alberta, Canada. It is located about 80 km west of the city of Edmonton. The lake is fed by the Sturgeon River which eventually flows into the North Saskatchewan River.

Fish species that can be found in the lake include walleye, northern pike, yellow perch, lake whitefish and burbot.

== Settlements ==
Some settlements around the lake area:

- Gainford
- Lake Isle
- South View
- Silver Sands

The lake has many islands.
