= Télesphore St. Arnaud =

Canadian politician

Member of the Legislative Assembly of Alberta
- In office July 18, 1921 – June 28, 1926
- Preceded by: Lucien Boudreau
- Succeeded by: Lucien Boudreau
- Constituency: St. Albert

Personal details
- Born: 15 December 1870 Champlain, Quebec
- Died: 15 January 1948 (aged 77) Vimy, Alberta
- Party: United Farmers
- Occupation: politician

Télesphore St. Arnaud (15 December 1870 – 15 January 1948) was a provincial politician from Alberta, Canada. He served as a member of the Legislative Assembly of Alberta from 1921 to 1926 sitting with the United Farmers caucus in government.

== Political career ==
St. Arnaud ran for a seat to the Legislature in the 1921 Alberta general election. He defeated Liberal incumbent Lucien Boudreau in a straight fight to pick up the St. Albert electoral district for the United Farmers. He did not run for re-election and retired at dissolution of the assembly in 1926.
