= St. Albert City Council =

Governing body in Canada

St. Albert City Council is the governing body of the City of St. Albert, Alberta, Canada. It is composed of a mayor and six councillors, aldermen prior to 2001. All seven members are elected at-large every four years, three years prior to 2013.

== Current council ==
- Scott Olivieri - Mayor
- Ken MacKay - Councillor
- Sheena Hughes - Councillor
- Shelley Biermanski- Councillor
- Sandy Clark - Councillor
- Amanda Patrick - Councillor
- Neil Korotash- Councillor

2025 results

== Previous City Councils ==
2017–2021

- Cathy Heron - Mayor
- Wesley Brodhead - Councillor
- Jacquie Hansen - Councillor
- Sheena Hughes - Councillor
- Natalie Joly - Councillor
- Ken MacKay - Councillor
- Ray Watkins - Councillor

2017 results

2013–2017

- Nolan Crouse - Mayor
- Wesley Brodhead - Councillor
- Cathy Heron - Councillor
- Sheena Hughes - Councillor
- Cam MacKay - Councillor
- Tim Osborne - Councillor
- Gilles Prefontaine - Councillor (2013-2016)
- Bob Russell - Councillor (2016-2017)

2013 results

2010–2013

- Nolan Crouse - Mayor
- Len Bracko - Councillor
- Wes Brodhead - Councillor
- Cathy Heron - Councillor
- Roger Lemieux - Councillor
- Cam MacKay - Councillor
- Malcom Parker - Councillor

2010 results

2007–2010

- Nolan Crouse - Mayor
- Len Bracko
- James Burrows
- Lorie Garritty
- Gareth Jones
- Roger Lemieux
- Carol Watamaniuk

2007 results

2004 Results
Mayor			Councillors					
Candidate	Votes	%	Candidate	Votes	%	Candidate	Votes	%
Paul Chalifoux	6,392	33.2	Len Bracko	9,311	48.3	Ben Van De Walle	4,593	23.8
Richard Plain	6,224	32.3	Neil Korotash	8,902	46.2	Stanley Haroun	3,351	17.4
Lynda Moffat	3,764	19.5	Lorie Garritty	8,376	43.4	Bob Lewis	3,055	15.8
Dave Burkhart	1,680	8.7	Christine Brown	7,168	37.2	Malcolm Parker	2,873	14.9
John Smith	1,218	6.3	James Burrows	6,462	33.5	Frances Badrock	2,779	14.4
			Nolan Crouse	6,443	33.4	Kerry Kineshanko	2,558	13.3
			Matthew Boiko	5,843	30.3	Alan Henry	1,999	10.4
			Neil Feser	5,429	28.2	Brian Kendrick	1,978	10.3
			Randy Duguay	5,030	26.1	Curtis Krenbrenk	1,604	8.3
			Michael Cooper	4,759	24.7	Jerry Voss	467	2.4
			Bob Russell	4,695	24.4			

2004–2007

- Paul Chalifoux - Mayor
- Len Bracko
- Christine Brown
- James Burrows
- Nolan Crouse
- Lorie Garritty
- Neil Korotash

2001–2004

- Richard Plain - Mayor
- Len Bracko
- James Burrows
- Neil Korotash
- Lynda Moffat
- Doug Ritzen
- Curtis Stewart

1998–2001

- Paul Chalifoux - Mayor
- Kent Davidson
- Margaret Plain
- Penny Reeves
- Bob Russell
- Jim Starko
- Carol Watamaniuk

1995–1998

- Anita Ratchinsky - Mayor
- Ken Allred
- Paul Chalifoux
- Margaret Plain
- Penny Reeves
- Bob Russell
- Carol Watamaniuk

1992–1995

- Anita Ratchinsky - Mayor
- Ken Allred
- Paul Chalifoux
- Kent Davidson
- Margaret Plain
- Penny Reeve
- Carol Watamaniuk

1989–1992

- Anita Ratchinsky - Mayor
- Ken Allred
- Len Bracko
- Ray Gibbon
- Jerry Manegre
- Margaret Plain
- Bob Russell

1986–1989

Dick Fowler resigned as mayor in March 1989, and city council selected Ray Gibbon to finish his term. Gibbon's aldermanic seat was left vacant until the next election.

Jerry Manegre was elected Alderman in a byelection on October 26, 1987 replacing George Kuschminder who resigned earlier in the year.

- Dick Fowler - Mayor (Oct '86-Mar '89)
- Ray Gibbon - Mayor (Apr-Sep '89)
- George Kuschminder (Resigned '87)
- Jerry Manegre (Elected Oct 26 '87)
- Margaret Plain
- Anita Ratchinsk
- Pam Smith
- Rod Throndson

1983–1986

- Dick Fowler - Mayor
- Ken Allred
- Roger Ayotte
- Liesbeth Bakker
- George Kuschminder
- Bill Shields
- Rod Throndson

1980–1983

- Dick Fowler - Mayor
- Ken Allred
- Roger Ayotte
- Liesbeth Bakker
- Louise Beland
- Bill Shields
- Rod Throndson

1977–1980

- Ronald Harvey - Mayor
- Roger Ayotte
- Liesbeth Bakker
- Barry Breadner
- Bill Shields
- Margaret Smith
- Rod Throndson

1977

- Richard Plain - Mayor
- Barry Breadner
- Myrna Fife
- Frank Lukay
- Margaret Smith
- Rod Throndson
- Garry Wetsch

== St. Albert Town Council ==
The St. Albert Town Council was the governing body of St. Albert, Alberta during its time as a town, which lasted from September 1, 1904 until December 31, 1956 and again from June 27, 1962 until December 31, 1976. The council was composed of a mayor and six town aldermen. The frequency of the council's election changed over time. Initially, the mayor was elected annually with the councillors being elected on staggered two year terms, with three being elected each year. When St. Albert became a town for the second time, in 1962, provincial legislation dictated instead that the entire council would be elected every three years.

1974–1976

- Richard Plain - Mayor
- Barry Breadner
- Myrna Fife
- Frank Lukay
- Margaret Smith
- Rod Throndson
- Garry Wetsch

1971–1974

- Ray Gibbon - Mayor
- John Bakker
- John de Bruijn
- Myrna Fife
- Robert "Bob" Hudson
- Frank Lukay
- Rod Throndson

1962–1965

- William Veness - Mayor
- John de Bruijn
- Bernard Montpetit
- Ed Powell
- Walter Skrobot
- David Stewart
- Loyd Wheating

== See also ==
- List of mayors of St. Albert, Alberta
