= Ray Gibbon Drive =

Road in Alberta, Canada

- 184 Street
- Start and end points of 184 Street and Ray Gibbon Drive
- Maintained by: Alberta Transportation; City of Edmonton; City of St. Albert
- ---- 184 Street
- Length: 6.1 km (3.8 mi)
- Location: Edmonton
- South end: 100 Avenue
- Major junctions: Stony Plain Road, 107 Avenue, 111 Avenue, 118 Avenue, Yellowhead Trail
- North end: Anthony Henday Drive
- ---- Ray Gibbon Drive (West Regional Road)
- Length: 8.3 km (5.2 mi)
- Location: Edmonton, St. Albert
- South end: Anthony Henday Drive
- Major junctions: LeClair Way, McKenney Avenue, Giroux Road
- North end: Villeneuve Road

Ray Gibbon Drive, referred to as the West Regional Road during proposal and planning stages, is a major arterial road in St. Albert, Alberta. With the exception of the Edmonton portion of 184 Street, it is only partially constructed as a two-lane road. Currently, it is 8.2 kilometres (5.1 mi) long and runs between Anthony Henday Drive and Villeneuve Road. It was named at the official opening of Stage One in October 2007, after former mayor of St. Albert Ray Gibbon, who served from 1968 to 1974 and again in 1989. Gibbon died in 1999, but his wife and family were present for the official opening, riding in the vintage lead vehicle for the first use of the road.

Ray Gibbon Drive preceded in Edmonton as 184 Street, an arterial road which begins at 100 Avenue and travels north to Anthony Henday Drive.

== Expansion ==
Plans to extend and upgrade Ray Gibbon Drive have been steadily revised in Edmonton Capital Region Transportation Planning documents.

=== Twinning ===
In 2020, construction commenced on widening the St. Albert portion of the road to a 4-lane expressway standard, as per requests in 2015 by St. Albert City Council, and approved by the Province of Alberta in 2019, with the $54.2 million price tag to be split equally by the City of St. Albert and the province. Construction was planned to be completed in four phases. As of 2023, construction of phases one and two have been completed, with the final two phases between McKenny Avenue and Villenueve Road anticipated to be completed in 2026 and 2029, respectively.

Original plans for a freeway conversion were abandoned, citing an unreasonable cost.

=== Extension ===
In 2005, the Province of Alberta began a study on the feasibility of extending Ray Gibbon Drive north of Villeneuve Road, with the goal of connecting to Highway 2 south of Morinville, deemed necessary by high traffic volume and congestion on St. Albert Trail, transferring the Highway 2 designation to Ray Gibbon Drive

In 2015, the City of St. Albert approved the creation of a new arterial road connecting Ray Gibbon Drive to St. Albert Trail (Highway 2), designated as Fowler Way. A study was published in 2018, laying out three potential right-of-ways for the road, aiming to reduce traffic on both St. Albert Trail and Villenueve Road.

=== Land ===
In 2016, the City of St. Albert proposed an annexation of 38 ha (0.15 sq mi) of fragmented land from the City of Edmonton, which was adjusted to a proposed 46.3 ha (0.18 sq mi) in March 2021. Throughout, the City of St. Albert has maintained that it would be more cost efficient for it to service and maintain this area, as the fragments are adjacent to serviced St. Albert land, while the natural barrier of the Anthony Henday Drive would make it less efficient for Edmonton to extend utility and other services. The fragments are located in a small northwest section of the Anthony Henday transportation utility corridor (adjacent to the north side of Anthony Henday Drive), adjacent to the south side of St. Albert, east of the southern-most 1 kilometre (0.62 mi) stretch of Ray Gibbon Drive owned and serviced by the City of Edmonton (see #Major intersections), and to the west and south of 137 Avenue NW.

== Major intersections ==
Location	km	mi	Destinations	Notes
Edmonton	0.0	0.0	100 Avenue	One-way eastbound
Edmonton	0.4	0.25	Stony Plain Road to Highway 16A west	
Edmonton	1.8	1.1	107 Avenue	
Edmonton	2.5	1.6	111 Avenue	
Edmonton	3.2	2.0	116 Avenue / 118 Avenue	
Edmonton	3.9	2.4	Yellowhead Trail (Highway 16)	Partial cloverleaf interchange; Highway 16 exit 379
Edmonton	6.1 0.0	3.8 0.0	Anthony Henday Drive (Highway 216)	Partial cloverleaf interchange; Highway 216 exit 27
Edmonton	6.1 0.0	3.8 0.0	North end of 184 Street • South end of Ray Gibbon Drive	
Edmonton	1.0	0.62	137 Avenue	
St. Albert	2.0	1.2	LeClair Way (137 Avenue realignment)	
St. Albert	3.4	2.1	Crosses the Sturgeon River	
St. Albert	4.8	3.0	Meadowview Drive / McKenney Avenue	
St. Albert	6.1	3.8	Giroux Road	
St. Albert	8.2	5.1	Villeneuve Road (Highway 633 west)	
Sturgeon County			Future extension to Highway 2 (no construction timeline)	
1.000 mi = 1.609 km; 1.000 km = 0.621 mi: Route transition; Unopened

== See also ==
- List of streets in Edmonton
- Transportation in Edmonton
