= Sturgeon River (Alberta) =

River in Alberta, Canada

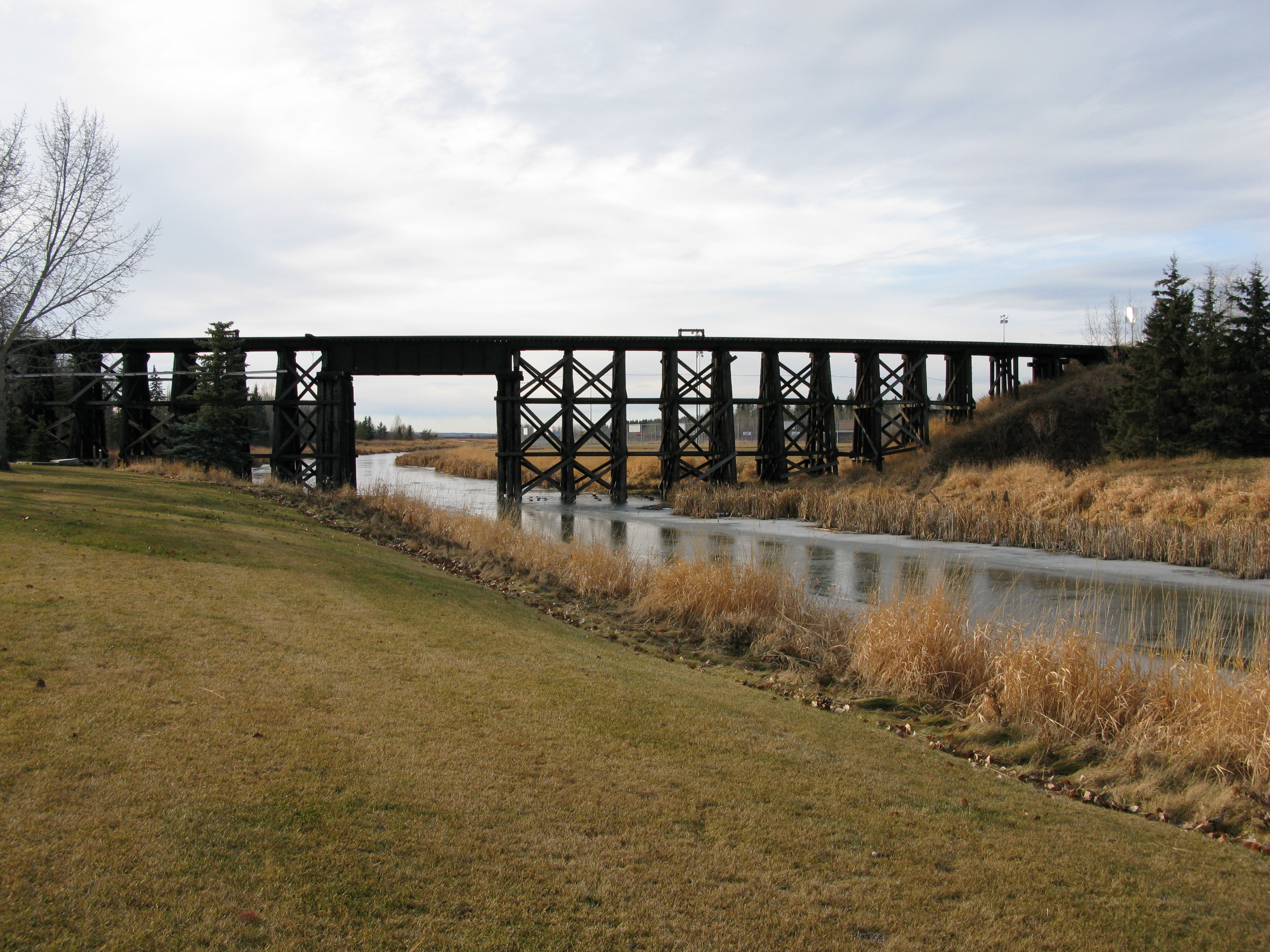
- Sturgeon River in St. Albert

Location
- Country: Canada
- Province: Alberta
- Cities: St. Albert

Physical characteristics
- Source
  - location: Hoople Lake, Alberta
  - elevation: 840 m (2,760 ft)
- Mouth
  - location: North Saskatchewan River
  - coordinates: 53°46′05″N 113°10′15″W
  - elevation: 600 m (2,000 ft)
- Length: 260 km (160 mi)
- Basin size: 3,301 km^{2} (1,275 sq mi)
- Discharge
  - average: 1 m^{3}/s (35 cu ft/s)

The Sturgeon River is a 260-kilometre-long (160 mi) river in central Alberta. It is a major tributary of the North Saskatchewan River. The river crosses Sturgeon County, which was named for this river. For much of its length, the Sturgeon is the northwestern-most major river in the Hudson Bay drainage basin, as the river runs close to and parallel to the Arctic Divide.

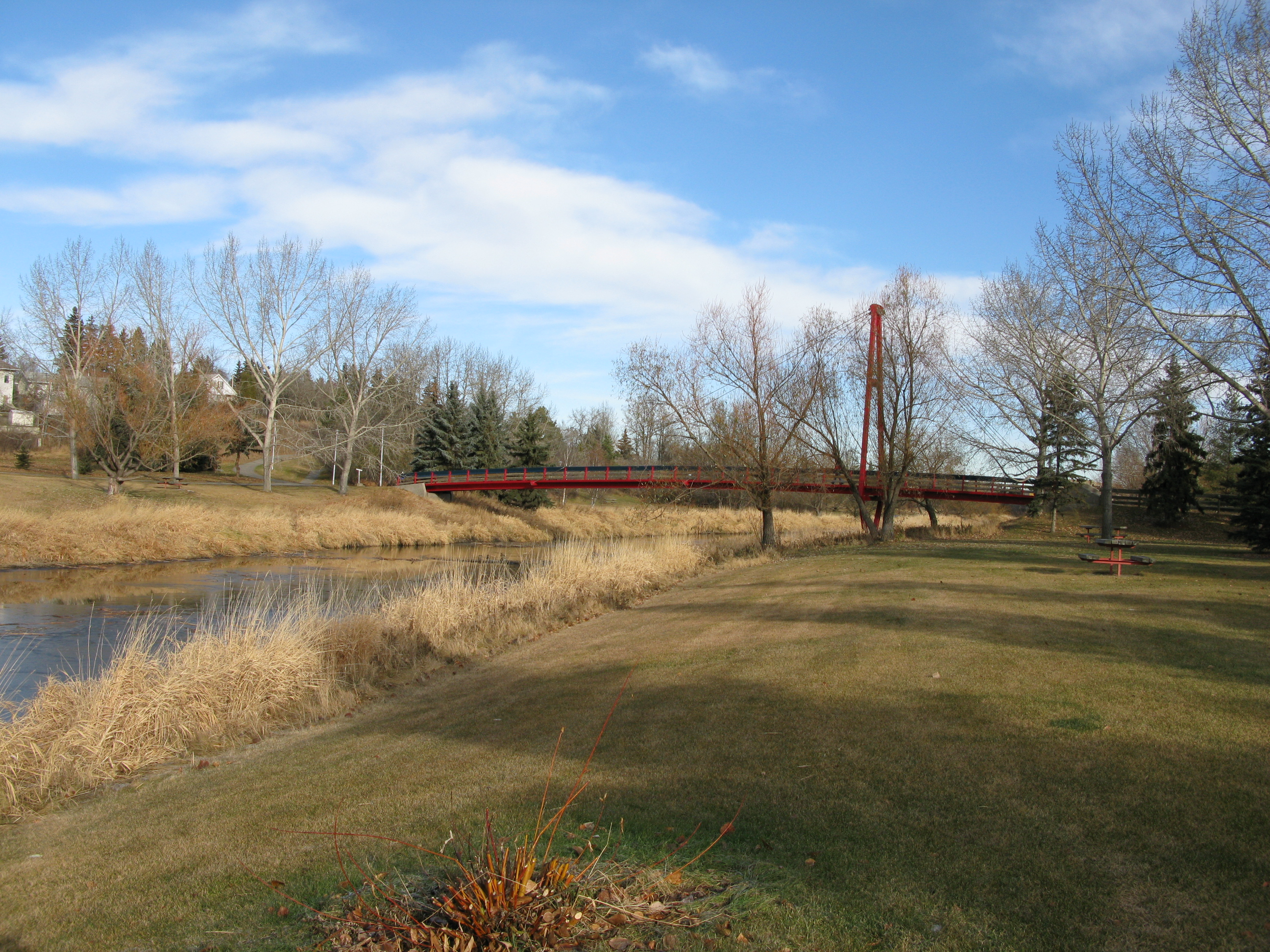
The Sturgeon River in St. Albert

At the Villeneuve station, Sturgeon River has a discharge of 0.4 to 3 m^{3}/s.

Fish species which may be found in the river include: walleye, pike, perch, burbot, goldeye, sturgeon, whitefish, and sauger.

== Course ==
The Sturgeon River originates about 90 kilometres (56 mi) west of Edmonton just west of Isle Lake. It flows east toward Edmonton and about 15 kilometres (9.3 mi) northwest of Edmonton (near St. Albert) turns northeast after entering Big Lake. About 38 kilometres (24 mi) north-northeast of Edmonton (near Gibbons) it turns to the southeast. It enters the North Saskatchewan River at a point about 35 kilometres (22 mi) northeast of Edmonton and about 8 kilometres (5.0 mi) northeast of Fort Saskatchewan.

== Tributaries ==
- Rivière Qui Barre
- Atim Creek
- Little Egg Creek

Numerous lakes are found in the upper watershed, including Isle Lake, Lac Ste. Anne, Birch Lake, Sandy Lake, Deadman Lake, Matchayaw Lake, Gladu Lake, Atim Lake and Big Lake.

== See also ==
- List of Alberta rivers
