= St. Albert, Alberta =

St. Albert
- City
- City of St. Albert
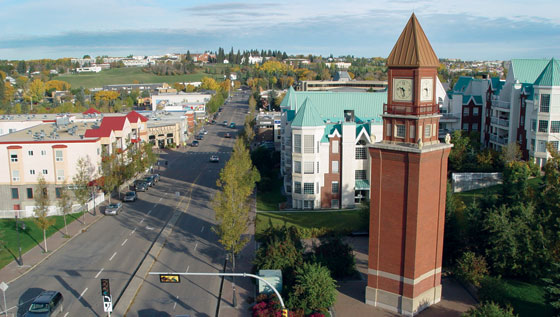
- View of Downtown St. Albert

- Flag Logo

- City boundaries

- Location in Alberta Location in Canada Location near Edmonton
- Coordinates: 53°38′13″N 113°37′13″W
- Country: Canada
- Province: Alberta
- Region: Edmonton Metropolitan Region
- Adjacent municipal district: Sturgeon County
- Founded: 1861
- Incorporated
  - Village: December 7, 1899
  - Town: September 1, 1904
  - New town: January 1, 1957
  - Town: July 3, 1962
  - City: January 1, 1977
- Named for: Albert of Louvain

Government
  - Mayor: Scott Olivieri
  - Governing body: St. Albert City Council: Shelley Biermanski; Sandy Clark; Sheena Hughes; Neil Korotash; Ken MacKay; Amanda Patrick
  - CAO: William Fletcher
  - MP: Michael Cooper (St. Albert—Edmonton-CPC)
  - MLA: Marie Renaud (St. Albert-NDP); Dale Nally (Morinville-St. Albert-UCP)

Area (2021)
  - Land: 47.84 km^{2} (18.47 sq mi)
- Elevation: 689 m (2,260 ft)

Population (2021)
  - Total: 68,232
  - Density: 1,426.4/km^{2} (3,694/sq mi)
  - Municipal census (2018): 66,082
  - Estimate (2020): 69,335
- Time zone: UTC−06:00 (Alberta Time)
- Forward sortation area: T8N
- Area codes: 780, 587, 825, 368
- Highways: Highway 2; Highway 216; Highway 633
- Waterways: Sturgeon River, Big Lake
- Website: Official website

St. Albert is a suburban city in Alberta, Canada, next to the Sturgeon River, northwest of the City of Edmonton, the provincial capital. It was originally settled as a Métis community, and is now the second-largest city in the Edmonton Metropolitan Region. St. Albert first received its town status in 1904 and was reached by the Canadian Northern Railway in 1906. Originally separated from Edmonton by several miles of farmland, the 1980s expansion of Edmonton's city limits placed St. Albert immediately adjacent to the larger city on St. Albert's southern and eastern sides.

== History ==
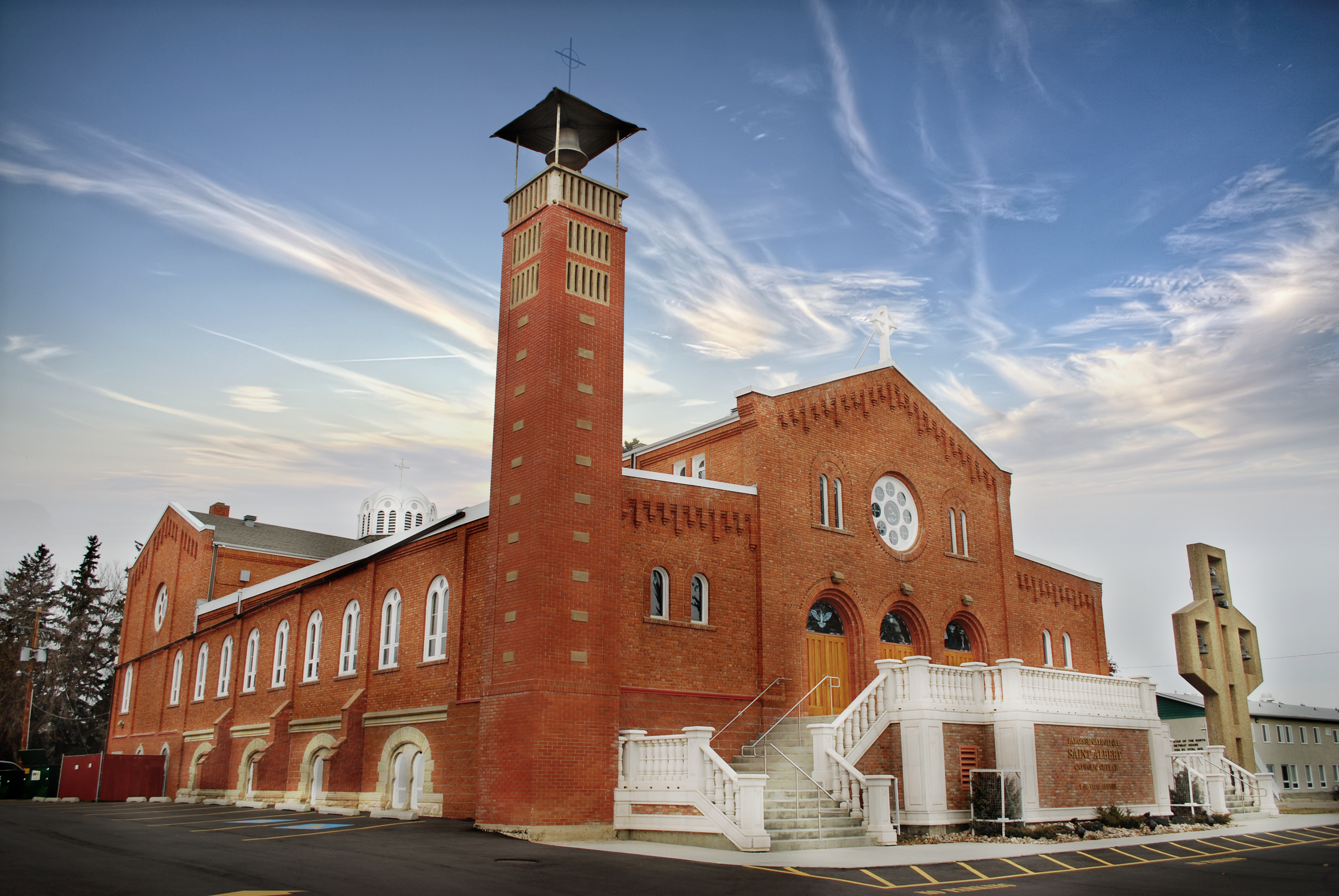
St. Albert Parish, atop what is now St. Albert's Mission Hill.

St. Albert was founded in 1861 as a Métis settlement by Father Albert Lacombe, OMI, who built a small chapel, the Father Lacombe Chapel, in the Sturgeon River valley. The chapel still stands to this day on Mission Hill in St. Albert. The original settlement was named Saint Albert by Bishop Alexandre-Antonin Taché, OMI, after Lacombe's name saint, Saint Albert of Louvain. Originally, although Lacombe had intended to found the mission at Lac Ste. Anne, the soil proved infertile, thus he moved the settlement to what would become St. Albert. This location offered several advantages, notably its easy access to supplies of wood and water, in addition to its excellent soil, it being a regular stopping-point for First Nations peoples on their travels, and its proximity to Fort Edmonton, where the priests could purchase necessary supplies and minister to Catholic workers. A few years later, a group of Grey Nuns would follow Lacombe from Lac Ste. Anne. More Métis from Lac Ste. Anne arrived in 1863 and, by December 1864, the population was roughly 300. In 1870, localised outbreaks of smallpox had spread northward into St. Albert, killing 320 of the area's then-900 residents.

St. Albert was previously the site of two Indian residential schools as part of the Canadian Residential School System. The St. Albert Indian Residential School ("Youville") was located on Mission Hill within the St. Albert city limits and was operated by the Roman Catholic Church from October 22, 1873, to June 30, 1948, after being relocated from the Lac Ste. Anne Mission, the site of its original founding. The Edmonton Indian Residential School ("Poundmaker") was located approximately 6 km east of St. Albert's current downtown area, and was operated by the Methodist Church from March 1, 1924, to June 30, 1968, later becoming the home of the Poundmaker Lodge rehabilitation centre. Between the two schools, 53 students are known to have died under unknown or dubious circumstances while in attendance. A healing garden, named Kâkesimokamik, was opened on September 15, 2017, as part of the truth-and-reconciliation process between the city of St. Albert and survivors (and their descendants) of the residential school system.

During the late 20th and early 21st centuries, it was mistakenly assumed that the community had been named after St. Albert the Great, due to incorrectly-printed information in the 1985 history of St. Albert, The Black Robe's Vision, published by amateur historians of the St. Albert Historical Society. This led to the City of St. Albert erroneously promoting St. Albert the Great as the community's "patron saint", even erecting a statue of the incorrect saint in the downtown area. However, the misconception was not corrected until 2008. The original chapel has since become an historic site, staffed with historical interpreters, and is open to the public during the summer season.

Also located in St. Albert is the St. Albert Grain Elevator Park, featuring two historic grain elevators; the original grain elevator was constructed in 1906 by the Brackman-Ker Milling Company, with the other being built later, in 1929, by The Alberta Wheat Pool company. The original 1906 elevator was originally red in colour, but has faded with time to a metallic silver. There is also a reproduction of the original 1909 railway station housed at Grain Elevator Park, erected in 2005. On Madonna Drive stands the Little White School House, which is open to the public. Arts and Heritage – St. Albert maintains the site, as well as the Grain Elevators and other heritage buildings, in addition to other sites under-restoration in the city. In June 2009, the City Council approved a multi-staged plan for the heritage sites, featuring the restoration of the grain elevators and the opening of both a Métis and French Canadian farm on adjacent lots by the River.

== Economy ==
St. Albert has an active and skilled labour force with a low unemployment rate of 4.3%. In 2011, 67.5% of the 40,560 adults aged 25 years and over in St. Albert had completed some form of postsecondary education, compared with 59.6% at the national level.

Of the population aged 25 years and over in St. Albert, 31.7% had a university certificate or degree. An additional 24.3% had a college diploma and 11.6% had a trades certificate.

The share of the adult population that had completed a high school diploma as their highest level of educational attainment was 23.7%, and 8.8% had completed neither high school nor any postsecondary certificates, diplomas or degrees.

== Demographics ==
Federal census population history
Year	Pop.	±%
1901	472	—
1906	543	+15.0%
1911	614	+13.1%
1916	655	+6.7%
1921	800	+22.1%
1926	684	−14.5%
1931	825	+20.6%
1936	811	−1.7%
1941	697	−14.1%
1946	804	+15.4%
1951	1,129	+40.4%
1956	1,320	+16.9%
1961	4,059	+207.5%
1966	9,736	+139.9%
1971	11,800	+21.2%
1976	24,129	+104.5%
1981	31,996	+32.6%
1986	36,710	+14.7%
1991	42,146	+14.8%
1996	46,888	+11.3%
2001	53,081	+13.2%
2006	57,719	+8.7%
2011	61,466	+6.5%
2016	65,589	+6.7%
2021	68,232	+4.0%
Source: Statistics Canada

In the 2021 Census of Population conducted by Statistics Canada, the City of St. Albert had a population of 68,232 living in 25,938 of its 27,019 total private dwellings, a change of 4% from its 2016 population of 65,589. With a land area of 47.84 km^{2} (18.47 sq mi), it had a population density of 1,426.3/km^{2} (3,694.0/sq mi) in 2021.

In the 2016 Census of Population conducted by Statistics Canada, the City of St. Albert had a population of 65,589 living in 23,954 of its 24,446 total private dwellings, a change of 6.7% from its 2011 population of 61,466. With a land area of 48.45 km^{2} (18.71 sq mi), it had a population density of 1,353.7/km^{2} (3,506.2/sq mi) in 2016.

The population of the City of St. Albert according to its 2018 municipal census is 66,082, a change of 2.2% from its 2016 municipal census population of 64,645.

=== Ethnicity ===
In 2021, 83.4% of residents were white/European, 11.1% were visible minorities and 5.5% were Indigenous. The largest visible minority groups were Filipino (3.1%), South Asian (1.7%), Black (1.5%), Chinese (1.3%), and Arab (1.0%).

Panethnic groups in the City of St. Albert (2001–2021)
Panethnic group	2021		2016		2011		2006		2001	
Panethnic group	Pop.	%	Pop.	%	Pop.	%	Pop.	%	Pop.	%
European (Note: Statistic includes all persons that did not make up part of a visible minority or an indigenous identity.)	55,835	83.4%	55,850	86.7%	54,260	89.72%	53,185	92.75%	49,305	93.43%
Indigenous	3,685	5.5%	2,830	4.39%	2,205	3.65%	1,640	2.86%	1,220	2.31%
Southeast Asian (Note: Statistic includes total responses of "Filipino" and "Southeast Asian" under visible minority section on census.)	2,335	3.49%	1,630	2.53%	835	1.38%	320	0.56%	530	1%
South Asian	1,170	1.75%	915	1.42%	875	1.45%	470	0.82%	490	0.93%
East Asian (Note: Statistic includes total responses of "Chinese", "Korean", and "Japanese" under visible minority section on census.)	1,120	1.67%	900	1.4%	810	1.34%	745	1.3%	605	1.15%
African	1,035	1.55%	800	1.24%	530	0.88%	245	0.43%	260	0.49%
Middle Eastern (Note: Statistic includes total responses of "West Asian" and "Arab" under visible minority section on census.)	775	1.16%	770	1.2%	450	0.74%	435	0.76%	205	0.39%
Latin American	605	0.9%	370	0.57%	285	0.47%	155	0.27%	85	0.16%
Other/multiracial (Note: Statistic includes total responses of "Visible minority, n.i.e." and "Multiple visible minorities" under visible minority section on census.)	380	0.57%	350	0.54%	235	0.39%	165	0.29%	70	0.13%
Total responses	66,945	98.11%	64,415	98.21%	60,480	98.4%	57,345	99.35%	52,770	99.41%
Total population	68,232	100%	65,589	100%	61,466	100%	57,719	100%	53,081	100%
Note: Totals greater than 100% due to multiple origin responses

=== Language ===
As of 2021, 86.0% of residents spoke English as their mother tongue in 2021. The next most common first languages were French (2.6%), Tagalog (1.5%), German (0.8%), Spanish (0.7%) Ukrainian (0.6%), Chinese languages (0.6%), and Arabic (0.5%). 1.3% of the population listed both English and a non-official language as mother tongues, while 0.7% listed both English and French.

=== Religion ===
According to the 2021 census, 55.4% of residents were Christian, down from 68.3% in 2011. 27.9% were Catholic, 13.6% were Protestant, 8.3% were Christian n.o.s, 1.4% were Christian Orthodox and 4.2% belonged to other Christian denominations and Christian-related traditions. 41.3% were non-religious or secular, up from 28.8% in 2011. All other religions and spiritual traditions accounted for 3.0% of the population. The largest non-Christian religions were Islam (1.6%) and Hinduism (0.4%).

== Arts and culture ==
Located in the heart of downtown, St. Albert Place is the focal point of many community events and activities. Designed by world-renowned Canadian architect Douglas Cardinal, its sculptural symmetry mimics the curves of the Sturgeon River that runs behind it. There are no corners; only curves. Built in 1984, St. Albert Place was designed as a "people place", housing a unique combination of civic government and cultural activity. Currently it houses the St. Albert Public Library, Musée Héritage Museum, Visual Arts Studio and Arden Theatre, as well as City Hall and associated city government services. The Musée Héritage Museum celebrates and explores the story of St. Albert through a variety of programs which seek to preserve the community's history for the future. The museum houses both permanent and temporary exhibits and also contains a Children's Discovery Room and gift shop. The archives at the museum consist of over 6,500 artifacts, 1,100 programming objects, 70 linear metres of textual record, around 3,000 pre-1948 photographs and thousands of post-1948 photographs. The museum is operated by Arts and Heritage St. Albert.

St. Albert has a rich arts scene. St. Albert is home to a writers' guild and painters' guild and renowned bands like Social Code and Tupelo Honey hail from St. Albert. The Arden Theatre is a popular venue for many plays and musical performances.

The St. Albert public art gallery, Art Gallery of St. Albert is a focal point of St. Albert's downtown. The gallery is housed in the historical Banque d'Hochelaga building in the heart of downtown St. Albert. The gallery features monthly exhibitions, a variety of public programs and also runs an annual art auction in St Albert. The Art Gallery of St. Albert is one of the stops on the St. Albert ArtWalk. The gallery is operated by Arts and Heritage St. Albert.

St. Albert is also notable for its Aboriginal heritage. The city is home to the Michif Institute founded by former Senator Thelma Chalifoux, dedicated to preserving and spreading knowledge of the city's Métis background. The Musée Héritage Museum contains many Métis artifacts. Many of the street signs in the city's downtown core are also trilingual, written in French and Cree in addition to English, as a tribute to the city's multiracial and multilinguistic origins. A current city project is to replace English-only signs with trilingual versions as the English-only versions wear out.

In 2008, NBC decided to film portions of its new horror/suspense anthology series Fear Itself in St. Albert's downtown and river valley.

St. Albert also has a St. Albert Children's Theatre group putting on two large musicals a year with many summer camps to participate in.

St. Albert is home to the St. Albert Community Band, whose motto is "Music is for Life!"

=== Festivals and events ===
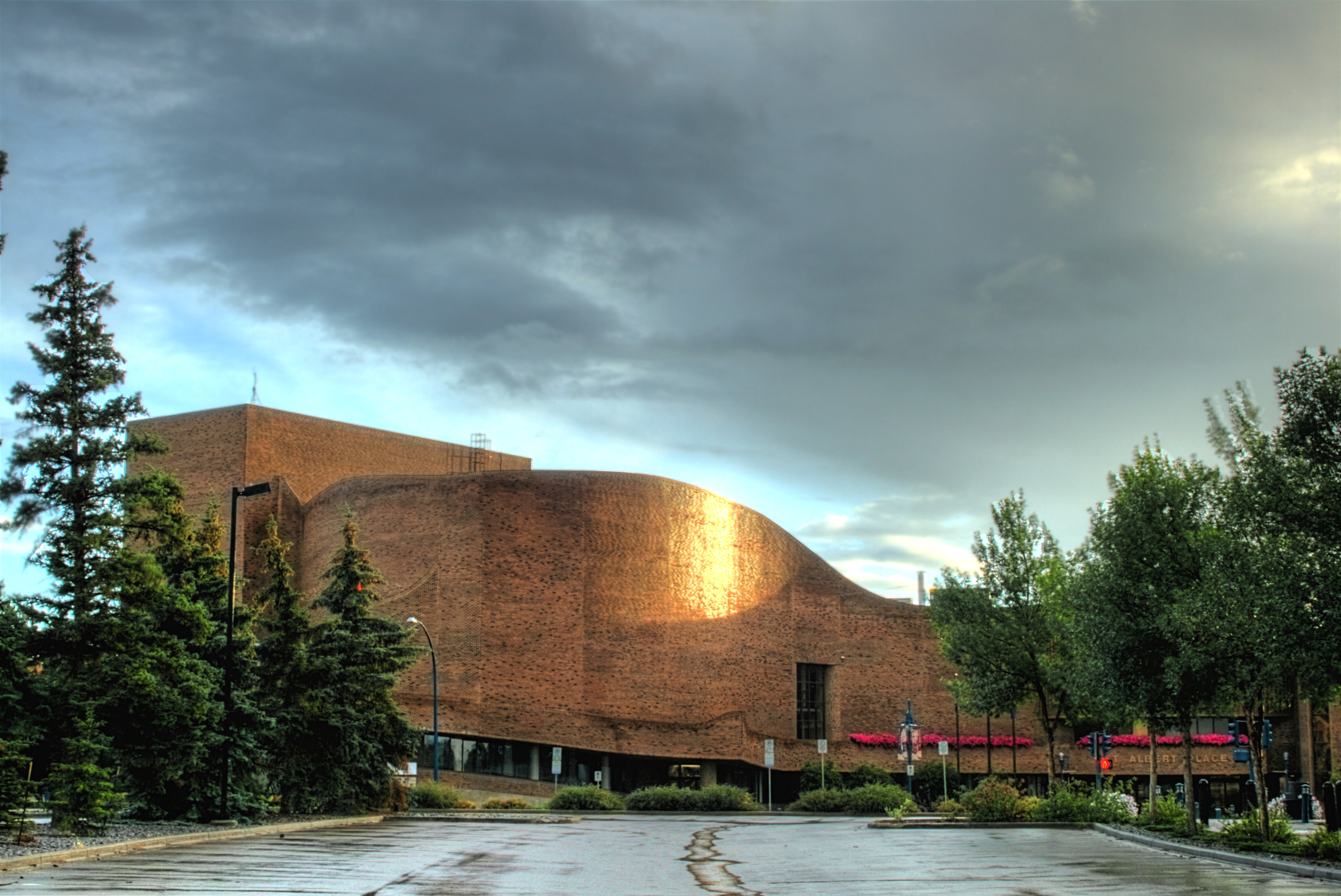
The St. Albert Place complex

The Kinsmen Rainmaker Rodeo starts with a parade that winds its way through the heart of St. Albert. After the parade, the rodeo begins, with rodeo events, midway, and musical performances.

The Outdoor Farmers' Market, held in downtown St. Albert, is Western Canada's largest outdoor farmers' market, attracting 10,000 to 15,000 people every Saturday from June to October. You can find locally grown fresh produce, handmade products and crafts and listen to the music of the buskers.

As many as 6,000 participants come to St. Albert to enjoy Rock'n August, a five-day festival held to celebrate the rumbles of chrome pipes and the rim shots of classic Rock and Roll music.

Other annual events include the St. Albert Rotary Music Festival, and Mambos & Mocktails, a 3-hour jazz concert played every December at Bellerose Composite High School by the jazz band and choir.

St. Albert also host an annual Harvest Festival at the St. Albert Grain Elevator Park.

The Cheremosh Ukrainian Dance Festival, held at the Arden Theatre is one of the largest dance festivals of its kind in North America. It is hosted annually by the Cheremosh Ukrainian Dance Company and generally takes place during the second weekend in May.

=== Library services ===
The St. Albert Public Library (SAPL) is located in St. Albert Place in the heart of downtown. The Library provides a wide range of services for St. Albert residents and visitors, including lending materials such as books, CDs and DVDs, providing digital resources such as downloadable eBooks and eAudiobooks, databases and streaming products, providing services such as public computing and WiFi access and presenting learning opportunities such as children's storytimes, adult programs and educational sessions including technology training.

== Sports and recreation ==
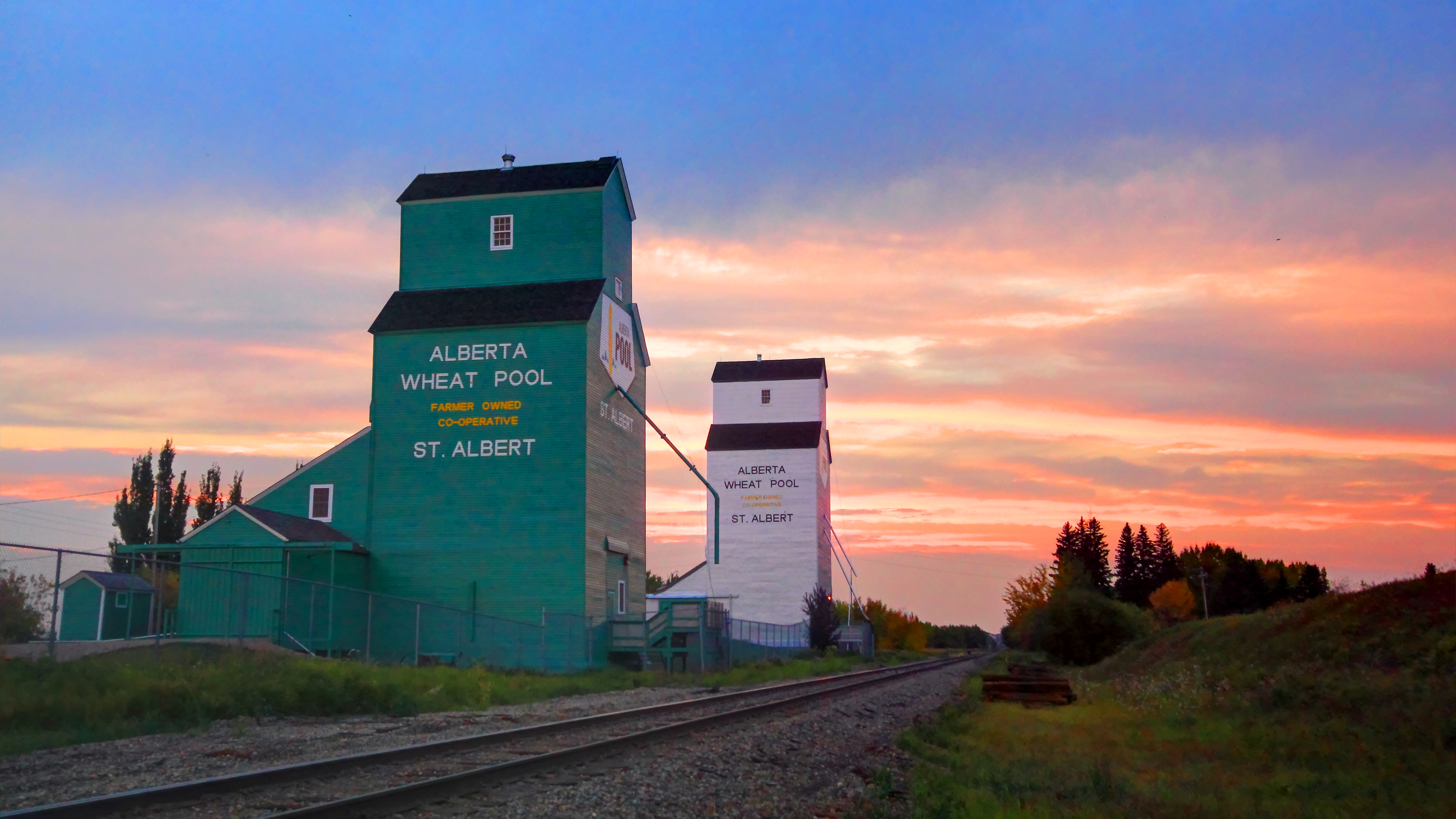
Historic Alberta Wheat Pool and Alberta Grain Co. grain elevators by the rail line in St. Albert. Both were saved from demolition and are now Provincial historic sites of Alberta, now known as the St. Albert Grain Elevator Park

Parks

The city has over 100 parks and playgrounds. The Red Willow park trail system winds its way all through St. Albert and connects many parks, schools, and residential areas, including Lacombe Lake Park.

Facilities

In September 2006, a $42.77-million multi-purpose leisure centre, Servus Credit Union Place, was built. It features a recreational aquatic centre, a kid's play area, the Troy Murray, Mark Messier and Go Auto Arenas, two indoor soccer/lacrosse fields, three basketball courts, a large exercise room, and a running track among other amenities. Construction of the facility, touted as an eventual break-even operation, was approved via plebiscite during the 2004 municipal election.

Servus Credit Union Place served as an expansion of the original Campbell Twin Arenas, which housed the Mark Messier and Troy Murray hockey rinks built in 1992, named for those two local National Hockey League (NHL) players. There was some controversy in 2006 when the city announced that they would rename the two existing rinks, and were going to offer those naming rights for sale. Following coverage of the controversy surfacing in Sports Illustrated, then mayor Paul Chalifoux decided to repeal the decision. The twin arenas were upgraded concurrent with the construction of Servus Credit Union Place.

A smaller pair of ice hockey arenas, the Kinex and Akinsdale arenas, were opened side by side in 1982 in the Akinsdale neighbourhood. The Akinsdale Arena served as the city's main arena until the opening of the Campbell Twin Arenas. In August 2019, a ceremony was held renaming Akinsdale Arena after retired NHL star Jarome Iginla, who played his minor hockey in St. Albert until leaving to the Western Hockey League as a 16-year-old.

There is also Fountain Park pool and Grosvenor pool, both offering a variety of pools, tennis courts, racketball courts and child play areas.

Hockey

St. Albert was twice formerly home to an Alberta Junior Hockey League (AJHL) franchise. Between 1977 and 2004, it was home to the St. Albert Saints, which produced players such as Mark Messier and Mike Comrie. The team moved to Spruce Grove in 2004, becoming the Spruce Grove Saints. In 2007, the AJHL returned to St. Albert when the Fort Saskatchewan Traders relocated to the city, becoming the St. Albert Steel. Playing out of Servus Credit Union Place, the team lasted five seasons before moving to Whitecourt in 2012, becoming the Whitecourt Wolverines.

NHL ice hockey player Jarome Iginla is from St. Albert. He played his entire minor hockey career in the St. Albert Minor Hockey Association, which included stints with the Bantam AAA Sabres and the Midget AAA Raiders. It was during the 1992–93 season with the Raiders that Iginla, then an under-age midget player, scored 87 points to lead the Alberta Midget AAA Hockey league in scoring. Following this season Iginla joined the Kamloops Blazers as a 16-year-old.

Other hockey players that have played in St. Albert are Rob Brown, Geoff Sanderson, Fernando Pisani, Paul Comrie, Stu Barnes, Brian Benning, Matt Benning, Steven Goertzen, René Bourque, Jamie Lundmark, Erik Christensen, Steve Reinprecht, Todd Ewen, Dion Phaneuf, Drew Stafford, Nick Holden, Emanuel Viveiros, Colton Parayko, Tyson Jost, Josh Mahura, and Joe Benoit.

Football

St. Albert recently added an artificial turf field in Riel Park as the home of every minor team in the city.

Cross Country Skiing

St Albert has cross country skiing along the Sturgeon River and at River Lot 56 Natural Area – Stanski. River Lot 56 is across from the NE corner of Sir Winston Churchhill Ave and Poundmaker Rd and has professionally groomed multiple loop trails with interpretive signs and maps.

Soccer

SASA Impact FC operated by the St. Albert Soccer Association has a pro-am women's team in the US-based United Women's Soccer.

== Government ==
St. Albert has traditionally elected members of the Conservative Party of Canada to the federal legislature. After the rise of the Reform Party of Canada and its subsequent change to the Canadian Alliance, John G. Williams was elected and served five terms as the city's Member of Parliament, becoming a Conservative MP after the Alliance's 2003 merger with the Progressive Conservative Party, before stepping down in 2008. Michael Cooper, of the Conservative Party of Canada, is the current Member of Parliament for St. Albert.

Provincially, most of St. Albert is currently represented by an Alberta New Democratic Party MLA (Marie Renaud) in the legislature, as well a United Conservative Party MLA representing the Northern part of the city and Morinville. In previous elections, it has alternated between Liberal and Conservative representatives.

St. Albert's governing body is composed of a mayor (currently Cathy Heron) and six city councillors. Municipal elections are held every four years.

=== Flag ===
St. Albert's flag is a red, white and blue design, with a stylized coat of arms located on the upper hoist. It was chosen by St. Albert's citizens in a citywide ballot, and was approved by the City Council in 1980. The blue and white, colours shared with Quebec, represents the Francophones and Métis peoples who first settled St. Albert. The red, white, and blue symbolizes Great Britain and the Anglophones that further shaped St. Albert.

== Education ==
The Little White Schoolhouse

=== K-12 education ===
School districts

- St. Albert Public Schools: Serving over 6000 students taught in a non-denominational setting. In St. Albert, St. Albert Public Schools' high school students attend Bellerose Composite High School or Paul Kane High School. Constitution Act, 1867; Alberta Act, 1905.
- Greater St. Albert Catholic Schools: This separate school division operates 17 schools and serves approximately 7600 students. In St. Albert, GSACRD's high school students attend ESSMY or St. Albert Catholic High School.

St. Albert is also home to two schools from the North Central Francophone School Board. Their schools are "École La Mission" (K-6) located in the Heritage Lakes subdivision and "École Alexandre-Taché" (7–12), located in the Erin Ridge subdivision. This school jurisdiction has minority language rights assured by the Constitution Act, 1982 (section 23).

=== Continuing education ===
St. Albert Further Education, known as "Further Ed", provides learning opportunities to the residents of St. Albert.

The STAR Literacy Program matches volunteer tutors with adults who wish to improve their reading and writing skills.

== Media ==
=== Print ===
There are currently two periodicals published in St. Albert: the weekly newspaper St. Albert Gazette, and the monthly magazine T8N.

The first publication in St. Albert was a French newspaper called Le Progrès, which began publishing in 1909. The bilingual St. Albert Star, or Étoile de St. Albert, was started in 1912, and offered issues in both English and French. The two versions of the paper would often carry unique stories that the other did not. In 1914, The Star ceased printing, and Le Progrès relocated to Edmonton.

It wasn't until 1949 that the next newspaper began publishing, which saw the first issue by the St. Albert Gazette. That version of the newspaper merged with the Morinville Journal in 1953. In 1961 a new newspaper with the same name was started. That version has undergone a number of name changes through the years, but is the one that exists today.

In 1998, the Saint City News was founded, operating as the Gazette's major competitor for 13 years until it closed in 2011.

Also in 2011, the St. Albert Leader was started. It was distributed for a short time, but stopped printing in 2015.

The long form monthly magazine T8N began distribution in 2014, and covers topics about the city and its people.

=== Radio ===
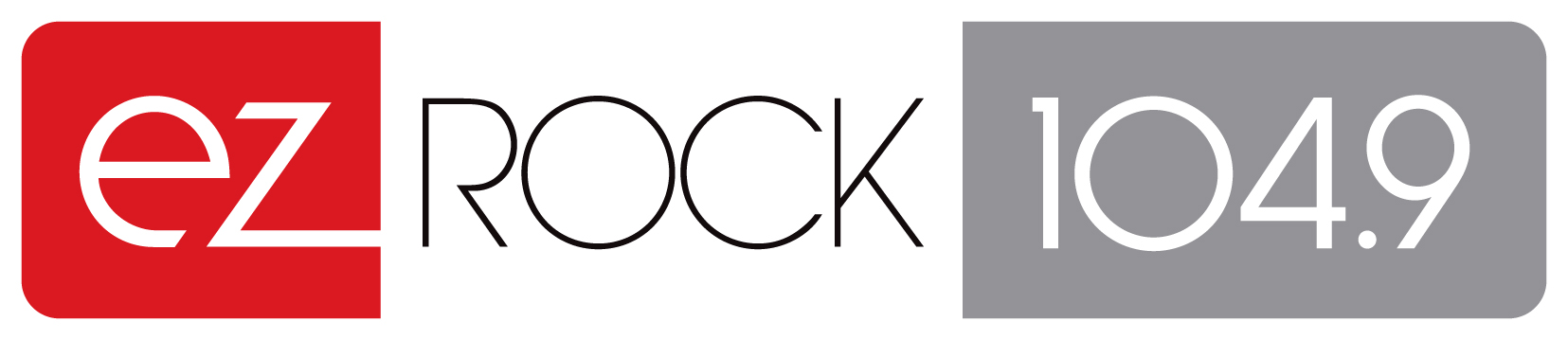
CFMG's EZ Rock logo, used from September 2010 to February 2011.

The first radio station in St. Albert came in 1978. The oldies station CKST Radio broadcast on frequency 1070 AM until it changed its callsign to CFMG in 1988. It was at this point that it began broadcasting on the 1200 AM frequency. The station would make another change in 1995, branding itself with the name EZ Rock. The change also saw the station move from AM radio to FM, broadcasting on 104.9 FM. The station was sold to Astral Media in 2007.

St. Albert lost the radio station after its most recent change in 2011, when it moved to Edmonton after changing formats from adult contemporary to top 40, becoming 104.9 Virgin Radio.

Due to the city's adjacency to Edmonton, all major Edmonton media—newspapers, television, and radio—also serve St. Albert.

== Transport ==
=== Air ===
The nearest airport providing passenger service is the Edmonton International Airport. Local air services are provided by the St. Albert Heliport to the northwest of the city and Villeneuve Airport to the west, while Sturgeon Community Hospital has a helipad to receive and transfer patients.

=== Public transit ===
The city runs St. Albert Transit (StAT) a public transport agency. It runs 21 local routes and 7 commuter routes to Edmonton. Village Transit Station is located at Gate Avenue and Grange Drive. St. Albert Exchange is located at Rivercrest Crescent and St. Vital Avenue. The Metro Line in Edmonton could be extended to St. Albert with four stations within city limits.

== Notable people ==
- Hercules Ayala, Puerto Rican born professional wrestler
- Hailey Benedict, country music singer-songwriter
- Rob Brown, NHL ice hockey player
- Colton Dach, NHL ice hockey player
- Kirby Dach, NHL ice hockey player
- Daryl Harr, racing driver
- Nick Holden, NHL ice hockey player
- Don Iveson, former Mayor of Edmonton
- Jarome Iginla, NHL ice hockey player, Olympic ice hockey medallist (x2)
- Tyson Jost, NHL ice hockey player
- Marc Kennedy, curler, Olympic curling medallist (x2)
- Krew, group of YouTuber siblings
- Josh Mahura, NHL ice hockey player, Stanley Cup Champion (x1)
- Mark Messier, NHL ice hockey player, Stanley Cup champion (x6)
- Meaghan Mikkelson, PWHPA ice hockey player, Olympic ice hockey medallist (x3)
- Troy Murray, NHL ice hockey player and broadcaster
- Colton Parayko, NHL ice hockey player, Stanley Cup champion (x1)
- Jason Thompson, Actor/Model.
- Matthew Savoie, NHL ice hockey player

== See also ==
- List of francophone communities in Alberta
