= Franco-Albertans =

Linguistic group

Franco-Albertains
- Franco-Albertan flag

Total population
- Francophones: 86,705 (2016) (Note: The following figure are Albertans that reported French as their mother tongue. The government of Alberta defines a Franco-Albertan as a francophone resident of the province.)

Regions with significant populations
- Alberta (Greater Edmonton, Greater Calgary)

Languages
- Canadian French · Canadian English · Franglais

Religion
- Christian (Roman Catholicism, other denominations)

Related ethnic groups
- Acadians · Franco-Columbian · Franco-Manitoban · Franco-Ontarian · Franco-Newfoundlander · Franco-Ténois · Franco-Yukonnais · Fransaskois · Québécois · Métis

Franco-Albertans (French: Franco-Albertains) are francophone residents of the Canadian province of Alberta. Franco-Albertans is a term primarily used to denote the province's francophone residents. In the 2016 Canadian Census, there were 86,705 Albertans that stated their mother tongue was French.

Francophones were the first Europeans to visit the province, with French Canadian voyageurs employed in the fur trade exploring the region in the late 18th century. French Canadians settled into a number of communities in the Northwest Territories during the 19th century, including communities in present day Alberta. Several French toponyms exist in Alberta, exemplifying the Francophone presence in the region. In 1928, the Association canadienne-française de l'Alberta was formed to promote francophone rights, and to lobby the interests of Franco-Albertans to the province. Following the enactment of the Canadian Charter of Rights and Freedoms in 1982, Franco-Albertans pushed for further linguistic rights within the province, eventually resulting in the province establishing an independent public francophone school system in 1994.

Approximately 72 per cent of Franco-Albertans are situated within the province's two largest cities, Edmonton, and Calgary. A number of other communities also form part of the Alberta Bilingual Municipalities Association.

The province is home to more than 100 francophone non-profit organizations. Radio-Canada, the country's French-language public broadcaster, serves as the main French-language media broadcaster in Alberta.

== Demographics ==
Alberta holds the fourth largest francophone population in Canada, following the provinces of Quebec, Ontario, and New Brunswick; the province also has the largest francophone community in Western Canada. According to the 2016 Canadian Census, the number of people that reported French as a mother tongue in Alberta was 86,705 (or 2.1 per cent of the population), making it the most common mother tongue in the province after English and Tagalog. The majority of Franco-Albertans are bilingual in English and French, with only 3,895 respondents (0.1 per cent of Albertans) in the 2016 census reporting they only had proficiency in the French language. There were 264,715 Albertans or 6.6 per cent of the population that reported that they were bilingual in English and French, although that figure includes Albertans that speak French as a second language.

The francophone community in Alberta is largely made up of migrants, with only 25 per cent of francophone residents of Alberta having been born in the province. Nearly 50 per cent of all Franco-Albertans migrated to Alberta from another Canadian province or territory, whereas 24 per cent of francophones in Alberta were born outside of Canada. Among the Franco-Albertans that were born outside Canada, approximately half originated from Africa, 23 per cent from Europe, 15 per cent from other countries in the Americas, and 13 per cent were from Asia.

In the 2016 census, 411,315 Albertans, or 10.5 per cent of the provincial population, reported having partial or full French ancestry. French is the sixth most commonly reported ethnic group in Alberta after Canadian, English, German, Scottish, and Irish.

=== Communities ===
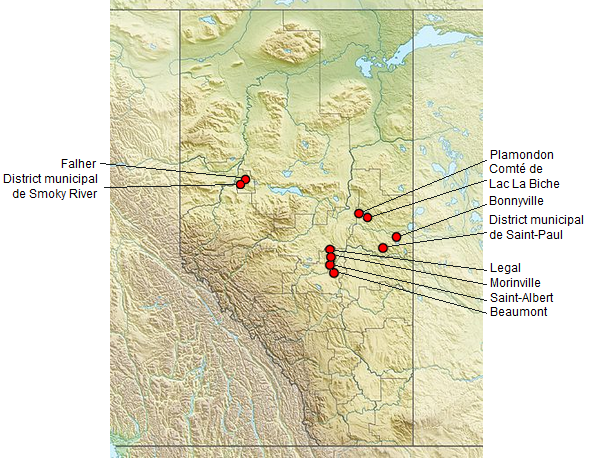
Communities in Alberta that form a part of the Alberta Bilingual Municipalities Association

The majority of Franco-Albertans reside within the Alberta's two largest metropolitan areas, Greater Edmonton, and the Calgary Region. The former holds 39 per cent of all francophone residents in the province, whereas the latter holds 33 per cent of all francophone residents in the province. The remaining Franco-Albertans are spread throughout the other regions of Alberta.

There are four municipalities in Alberta are officially bilingual and offer municipal services in French, Beaumont, Falher, Legal, and Plamondon. The four communities, in addition to Morinville, St. Albert, St. Paul, Bonnyville, and Smoky River also form a part of the Alberta Bilingual Municipalities Association (ABMA). Thirteen communities formed a part of the AMBA in 2018

== History ==
The first Europeans to visit Alberta were French Canadians during the late 18th century, working as fur traders and voyageurs for the Hudson's Bay Company, or the North West Company. French was the predominant language used in some early fur trading forts in the region, such as the first Fort Edmonton (in present day Fort Saskatchewan).

The early 19th century saw the introduction of French language education in the region, when French missionaries of the Oblates of Mary Immaculate were dispatched to evangelize the First Nations in the area. Roman Catholic French Canadian settlers were present in Calgary, Edmonton, Lac La Biche, Lac Saint-Anne, and St. Albert by the mid 1860s; during this time, colonizing clerics actively recruiting farmers from Quebec in the late 19th century.

In 1870, the Hudson's Bay Company ceded Rupert's Land and the North-Western Territory to the government of Canada, most of which was administered as the North-West Territories. Although English and French were official languages in the North-West Territories, the latter was quickly relegated in status; this was due to the influx of anglophone settlers made English the predominant language of the territory by the 1890s. In 1892, French was stricken as an official language of the territory's education system, and its legislature, with English made the only official language for deliberations in the legislature.

=== 20th century ===
The English-only policies of the 1890s were continued after the region was severed from the territory to form the province of Alberta; with no mention of linguistic rights in the province's establishing statute. Attempts to advance French language education rights were made by the French Canadian clergy, as they involved themselves in public separate school boards. In 1925, francophones in the provinces formed the Association canadienne-française de l’Alberta as a lobby to demand linguistic rights from the provincial government.

The mid 20th century saw the early development of several Franco-Albertan institutions, such as agricultural cooperatives, credit unions, and new Roman Catholic parishes. The Edmonton-based CHFA-FM, predecessor of Radio-Canada's French-language regional radio station, made its first broadcast in November 1949.

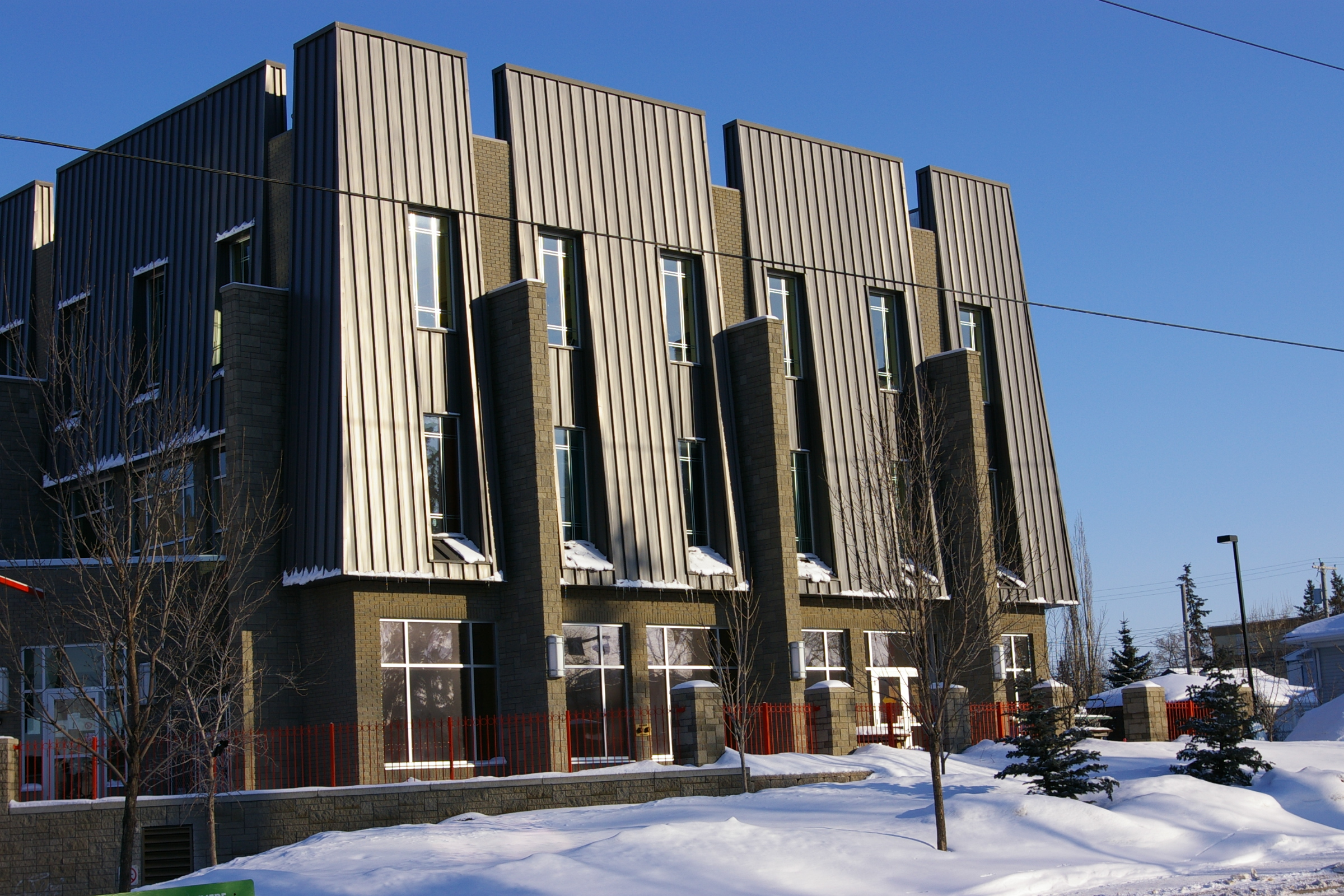
Offices for the Greater North Central Francophone Education Region school board. Francophone school boards were established in Alberta in 1994.

The enactment of the Canadian Charter of Rights and Freedoms in 1982 prompted Franco-Albertans to approach the public Catholic and secular school boards of Edmonton to establish a fully francophone school, although both school boards rejected the proposal. The refusal to provide public funding for a francophone school led the Association de l’École Georges et Julia Bugnet to bring forward a case that the provincial School Act conflicted with Section 23 of the charter. The case was eventually accepted by the Supreme Court of Canada, who made a ruling in March 1990, stating that language minority groups, such as Franco-Albertans, were guaranteed a "degree of management and control," of their education system. (Note: In this instance, linguistic minority population only refers to anglophones or francophones, with English and French being the official languages of Canada.) Another decision made by the Supreme Court in 1993 on Franco-Manitoban schools also further French language rights in other anglophone provinces in Canada, when the court asserted the rights of linguistic minorities to control their own education. The following decision prompted the province to create five new regional francophone school boards in 1994.

In 1997, the province signed the first Canada-Alberta Agreement on French Language Services, which is a joint federal-provincial fund aimed at funding French language services in the province. In 1999, the government of Alberta created the position of Francophone Secretariat to act as a liaison between the Franco-Albertan community and the government, and joined the Ministerial Conference on the Canadian Francophonie.

The push for linguistic rights by minority French Canadian populations in the 1980s and 1990s saw a reaction from anglophones in the province, prompting the provincial government to curtail the French language in other areas. Following the Supreme Court's ruling on R. v Mercure, a case involving a Fransaskois in Saskatchewan, the Legislative Assembly of Alberta passed the Languages Act in 1988, in which English was declared the province's official language, and replaced many of the French language rights permitted under the North-West Territories Act; although the Act still permitted the use of French in its legislature, and for judicial cases concerning provincial offences as directed by the court. French language access to the latter was later expanded in 1995, when a francophone service system was created for criminal proceedings.

=== 21st century ===
In 2017, the government of Alberta established its first French language policy, and adopted the Franco-Albertan Flag as an official symbol of the community. In the following year, the provincial government declared March as Alberta Francophonie Month.

== Politics ==
After the Alberta Languages Act was passed in 1988, English was made the only official language in the province. However, the same legislation provides stipulations that permits the use of French for deliberations in the legislature of Alberta, as well as provincial judicial system as directed by the courts. Access to government services in the French language was promoted in the "French Policy", introduced by the provincial government in 2017. However, no legislation exists that mandates provincial services provide accessibility in French, outside the rights afforded in the Languages Act; or the Education Act, the latter act only establishing the province's francophone public school system. There are four municipalities in Alberta that provide municipal services in both English and French, although the majority of communities in the province provide municipal services in only English.

Franco-Albertans interests are formally represented by the Association canadienne-française de l’Alberta, an organization formed in 1928, and officially incorporated by the Legislative Assembly of Alberta in 1964 in order to ensure its independence. The government of Alberta also established the Francophone Secretariat in 1999 to serve as a government liaison to the Franco-Albertan community. The secretariat forms a part of Alberta Culture, a ministry of the provincial government.

== Education ==
=== Elementary and secondary ===
French language education rights for minority francophone populations in Canada is guaranteed under section 23 of the Canadian Charter of Rights and Freedoms, and is further reinforced under section 14 of the province's Education Act. Prior to their enactment, francophone rights were limited in Alberta, with most public schools in the province being anglophone institutions.

French language education was permitted in Albertan public schools since 1896, although was limited and only conducted in anglophone elementary schools. Following the Royal Commission on Bilingualism and Biculturalism, the province of Alberta introduced bilingual schools, that saw teachers split between English and French for the instructional languages used in classes from Grades 3 to 12. Although open to Franco-Albertans, the bilingual programs was made primarily for anglophone, or bilingual students. Regulation 250/76 was introduced by the province in 1976, which permitted schools to use French as an instructional language for up to 80 per cent of the school day. The enactment of the charter eventually led the province to establish its first two publicly-funded francophone schools in 1984, and an independent francophone public elementary and secondary school system in 1994.

The province's public francophone schools are administered through one of four public school boards, the East Central Francophone Education Region, the Northwest Francophone Education Region, the Southern Francophone Education Region, and the Greater North Central Francophone Education Region. All four public school boards are mixed secular/separate school boards, operating 42 elementary and secondary schools in 27 different communities. There were 7,814 students enrolled in Alberta's public francophone elementary and secondary schools during the 2017–18 academic year.

=== Post-secondary ===
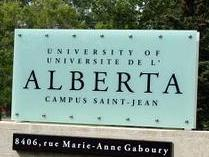
Entrance sign to the University of Alberta's Saint-Jean campus, the university's French language campus

There is no independent francophone post-secondary institution in the province. However, the University of Alberta operates as a bilingual institution, offering several bachelor and master's degree programs in the French language at its Saint-Jean campus in Bonnie Doon, Edmonton. The campus originated as the private francophone educational institution established in 1928, Juniorat Saint-Jean, before being absorbed by the University of Alberta in 1977. The university also operates a college on the same campus, offering two-year diploma programs in French since 2014. In 2018, there were 842 students registered at the Saint-Jean campus.

== Culture ==
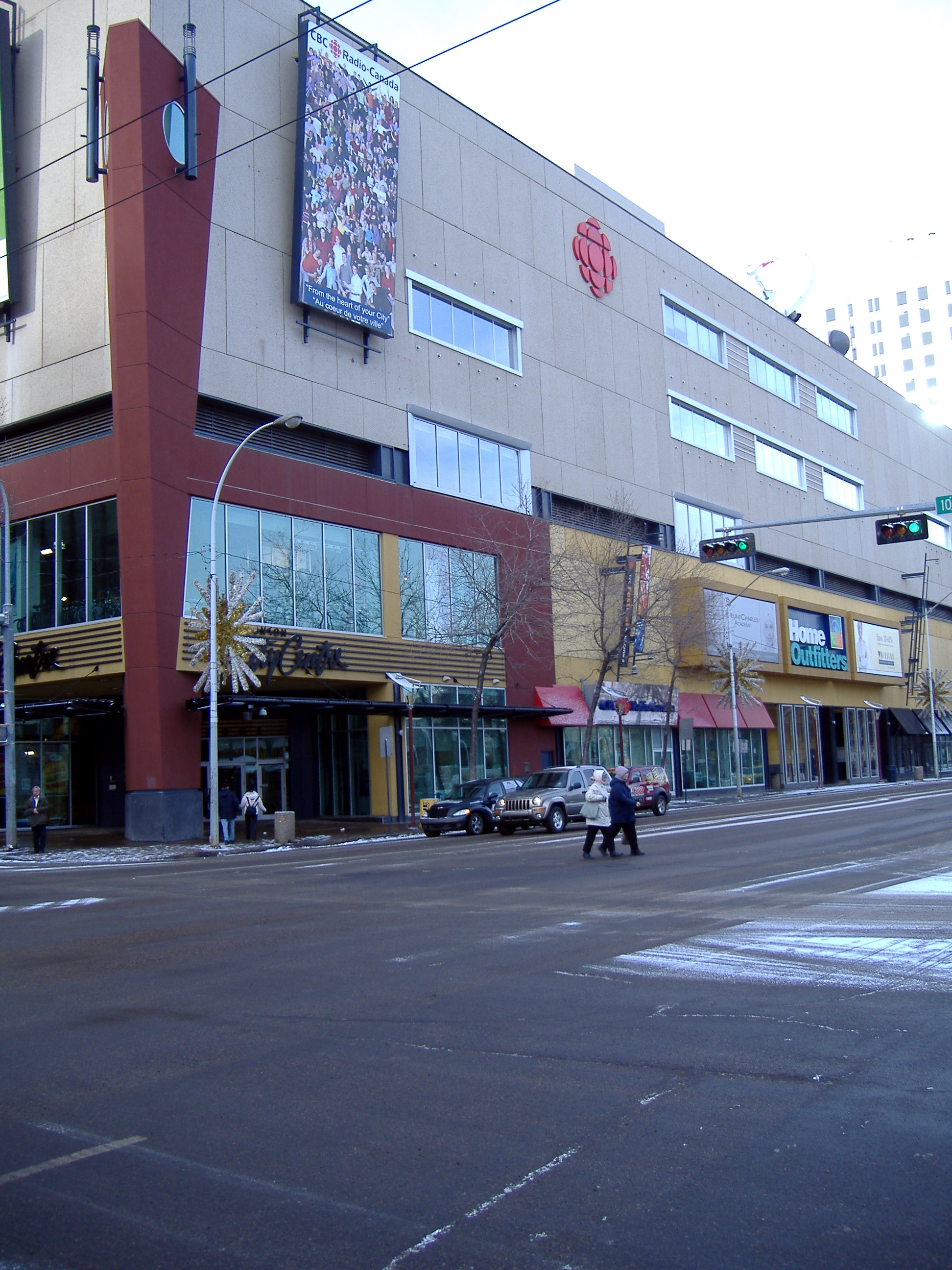
Edmonton City Centre houses a retail mall, and English and French language studios for CBC/Radio-Canada, the country's public broadcaster.

There are more than 100 francophone non-profit organizations in the province that operate in a wide variety of fields. La Cité Francophone in the Bonnie Doon neighborhood of Edmonton, adjacent to the Campus Saint-Jean, serves as a major provincial hub for Franco-Albertan organizations and hosts the annual Flying Canoë Volant festival. L'Unithéâtre in Edmonton and the Société de Théâtre perform French-language theatrical works, and the Chorale Saint-Jean performs French choral works. A number of French Canadian folk dancing troupes tour the province. The Centre d’arts visuels de l’Alberta provides a venue for francophone artists and craftsmen, and the annual Franco-Alberta Festival showcases French language and culture. The Regroupement artistique francophone de l'Alberta organizes events and offers professional development for francophone artists. The Carnaval de St. Isidore is another festival of franco-albertain culture held annually in St. Isidore, Alberta.

=== Media ===
Francophones in Alberta receive broadcast media service primarily from the television and radio services of the Société Radio-Canada, the French-language division of the Canadian Broadcasting Corporation, including Ici Radio-Canada Télé's station CBXFT-DT, Ici Radio-Canada Première's CHFA-FM and Ici Musique's CBCX-FM. Francophone community radio stations exist in Edmonton (CFED-FM) and Plamondon (CHPL-FM). A third community radio station, CKRP-FM in Falher, was shut down in 2017; however, it has since been relaunched as Nord-Ouest FM.

In print, the province is served by the French-language weekly newspaper Le Franco.

== Notable Franco-Albertans ==
=== Religion ===
- Father Albert Lacombe - Was a Roman Catholic missionary and one of the first notable Franco-Albertans. The cities of Lacombe, Alberta and St. Albert, Alberta are also named in his honour.

=== Law ===
- Mary Moreau - First Franco-Albertan appointed to the Supreme Court of Canada on November 6, 2023. She won the right for Albertans to choose a criminal trial in French with a French-speaking jury.

=== Politics ===
- Prosper-Edmond Lessard - Alberta’s first French-speaking cabinet minister. Liberal MLA for Pakan (1909-1913) and St. Paul (1913-1921), Senator for Alberta (1925-1931).
- Wilfrid Gariépy - founding Franco-Albertan/Canadian politician, Liberal MLA for Beaver River (1913-1921), Alberta Minister of Municipal Affairs (1917-1918), Provincial Secretary (1918).
- Jean Léon Côté - Liberal MLA for Athabasca (1909-1913) and Grouard (1913-1923)
- Ernest Côté -soldier, diplomat and civil servant.
- Joseph Miville Dechêne - Liberal MLA for Beaver River (1921-1926) and St. Paul (1930-1935), Liberal MP for Athabaska (1940-1958).
- Laudas Joly - United Farmers MLA for St. Paul (1921-1930) and Social Credit MLA for Bonnyville (1952-1955).
- Joseph Beaudry - Social Credit MLA for St. Paul (1935-1952).
- Léo Piquette - NDP MLA for Athabasca-Lac La Biche (1986-1989), francophone minority rights advocate.
- Paul André Joseph Langevin - Liberal, then PC MLA for Lac La Biche-St. Paul (1993-2001).
- Denis Ducharme - PC MLA for Bonnyville-Cold Lake (1997-2008).
- Hector Goudreau - PC MLA for Dunvegan-Central Peace-Notley (2004-2015), Alberta Minister of Tourism, Parks, Recreation and Culture (2006–2008), Alberta Minister of Municipal Affairs (2008-2011).
- Claudette Tardif - Liberal, then independent Senator for Alberta (2005–2018). Francophone of Russian descent.
- Colin Piquette - son of Léo Piquette, NDP MLA for Athabasca-Sturgeon-Redwater (2015–2019).
- Marie Renaud - NDP MLA for St. Albert (2015–present).
- Randy Boissonnault - first Franco-Albertan federal minister representing an Alberta riding. Liberal MP for Edmonton Centre (2015–2019; 2021–present), Parliamentary Secretary to the Minister of Canadian Heritage (2015-2017), Minister of Tourism and Associate Minister of Finance (October 26, 2021 to present).
- Pierre Poilievre - first Franco-Albertan federal minister. Conservative MP for Nepean—Carleton (2004-2025), Battle River—Crowfoot (2025–present), leader of the Conservative Party of Canada (2022–present).

=== Sports ===
- Chris Benoît - Professional wrestler. Born to a French-Canadian family in Montréal, but raised in Edmonton, and wrestled out of Calgary.
- Arthur Boileau - Former professional runner of French-Canadian descent. Represented Canada in the 1984 and 1988 Olympics in the Marathon. Born in Edmonton.

=== Art ===
- Crystal Plamondon - singer and songwriter from Plamondon, Alberta.
- Marguerite-A. Primeau - French-language writer from St. Paul, Alberta who spent most of her writing career in Vancouver
- Les Bûcherons, a duo which presents French-Canadian music and dance to audiences throughout the province.
- Robert Goulet - American entertainer of French-Canadian parentage and Franco-Albertan residency. Migrated with his French-Canadian family from Massachusetts to northern Alberta when he was three months old. Was rumoured to be seeking Canadian citizenship, but died in 2007 before any action could be taken.
- Magali Michelet - journalist and author who wrote about women's lives in Alberta in the Courrier de l'Ouest from 1906 to 1916.

== See also ==
- French Canadians
  - Acadians, French-speaking Quebecer, Franco-Columbian, Franco-Manitoban, Franco-Newfoundlander, Franco-Ontarian, Fransaskois, Franco-Ténois, Franco-Yukonnais
