= Omer St. Germain =

Canadian politician

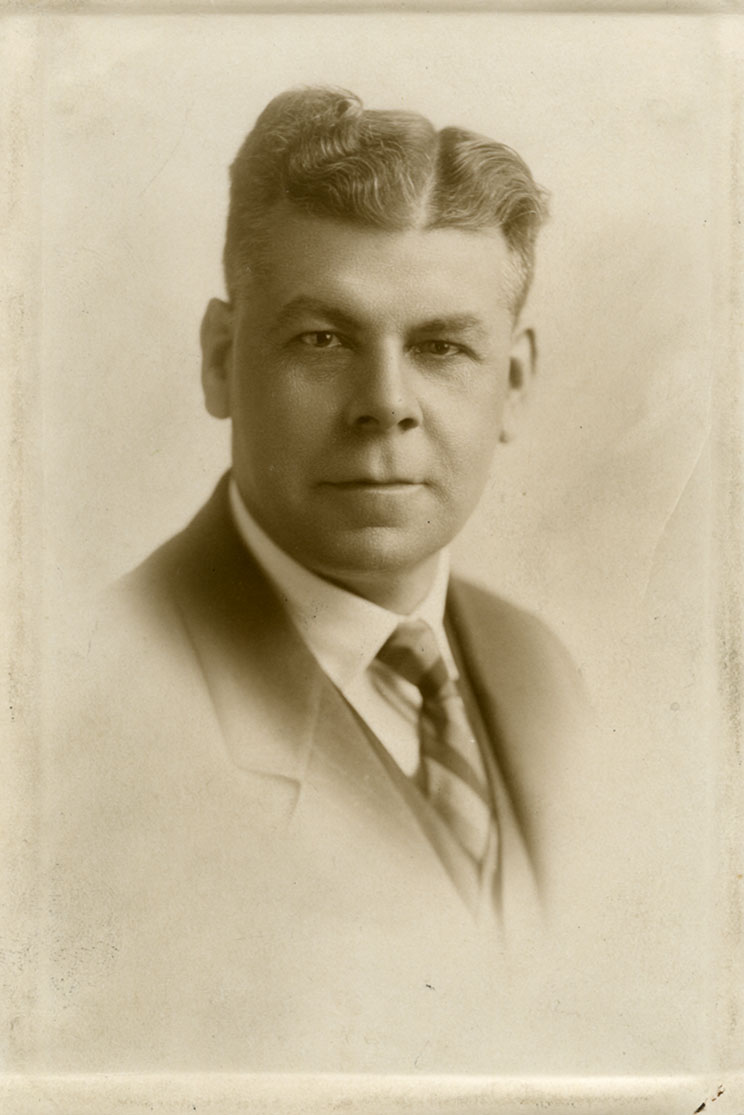

Member of the Legislative Assembly of Alberta
- In office June 19, 1930 – August 22, 1935
- Preceded by: Lucien Boudreau
- Succeeded by: Charles Holder
- Constituency: St. Albert

Personal details
- Born: 14 September 1877 St-Pie-de-Guire, Quebec
- Died: 11 February 1949 (aged 71)
- Party: Liberal; United Farmers

Omer St. Germain (13 September 1877 – 11 February 1949) was a barrister, solicitor, notary, publisher and a provincial politician from Canada. He served as the first mayor of Morinville, Alberta, and became a perennial candidate in Alberta elections hold office as a member of the Legislative Assembly of Alberta from 1930 to 1935 sitting with the United Farmers first and crossing the floor to the Liberals.

== Early life ==
Omer St. Germain was born in Quebec in 1877 and came to Alberta with his parents in 1890, settling on a homestead near Leduc. He received his education in Quebec and graduated in Law from the Laval University in 1905. From 1909 to 1912 St. Germain published the francophone news paper Le Progres which he owned. He had one son, Gerard St. Germain, born in 1910.

== Political career ==
St. Germain began his political career in the 1909 Alberta general election. He ran for a seat to the Alberta legislature as an Independent Liberal supporting the Rutherford administration. He finished in last place, losing to Liberal candidate Lucien Boudreau.

Three years later St. Germain was elected the first mayor of Morinville in 1911. He also served as mayor from 1915 to 1917 and 1929 to 1936.

St. Germain ran for a seat to the Alberta legislature for the second time in the 1930 Alberta general election as the United Farmers candidate defeating Lucien Boudreau. He caused a sensation on February 6, 1934 when he crossed the floor to the Liberals becoming the second MLA in the legislature in a week to do so.

St. Germain ran for a second term in office in the 1935 Alberta general election but was defeated by Social Credit candidate Charles Holder.

St. Germain tried to make a comeback by running for office for the last time in the 1948 Alberta general election. He was defeated by cabinet minister Lucien Maynard. He died a year later in 1949.
