= Henry Dakin =

Henry Dakin may refer to:

- Henry Drysdale Dakin (1880–1952), English chemist
- Henry H. Dakin (1870–1956), provincial politician in Alberta, Canada
