= Lobay =

Lobay, sometimes spelled Lobai or Lobaj, is a surname. Notable people with the surname include:

- Harry Lobay (1917–1991), Canadian politician
- Ivan Lobay (born 1996), Ukrainian footballer

== See also ==
- Lobaye River
