= Arthur Soetaert =

Canadian politician

Arthur Joseph Soetaert

Member of the Legislative Assembly of Alberta
- In office June 29, 1955 – June 18, 1959
- Preceded by: Lucien Maynard
- Succeeded by: Keith Everitt
- Constituency: St. Albert

Personal details
- Born: April 14, 1913 Edmonton, Alberta
- Died: September 14, 2006 (aged 93) Morinville, Alberta
- Party: Liberal

Arthur Joseph Soetaert (April 14, 1913 – September 14, 2006) was a provincial politician from Alberta, Canada. He served as a member of the Legislative Assembly of Alberta from 1955 to 1959 sitting with the Liberal caucus in opposition.

== Political career ==
Soetaert ran for a seat to the Alberta Legislature in the 1952 Alberta general election. He ran in the electoral district of St. Albert under the Liberal banner. Soetaert lost to incumbent MLA Lucien Maynard in a hotly contested race finishing a close second with vote transfers in the second count.

Soetaert ran for a second time in the 1955 Alberta general election. He faced Maynard again and ended up winning on the fourth count in vote transfers. He ran for his second term in the 1959 election but was defeated by Social Credit candidate Keith Everitt.

Soetaert died on September 14, 2006.
