= Keith Everitt =

Canadian politician

MLA for St. Albert
- In office 1959–1971
- Preceded by: Arthur Soetaert
- Succeeded by: Ernie Jamison

Personal details
- Born: April 2, 1923 Bon Accord, Alberta
- Died: August 26, 2015 (aged 92) Calgary, Alberta
- Party: Social Credit Party of Alberta
- Spouse: Thelma Margarite Hjeltman (m. 1942–2015)
- Children: Six

Harry Keith Everitt (April 2, 1923 – August 26, 2015) was a Canadian politician who was a member of the Legislative Assembly of Alberta and county councillor in Sturgeon County, Alberta.

== Biography ==
Everitt first ran for provincial office in the 1959 election, representing the Social Credit Party of Alberta in the riding of St. Albert. He unseated incumbent Liberal Arthur Soetaert by a margin of 75 votes. He won re-election in the 1963 and 1967 elections by increasing margins against the second place Liberal candidates, Louis Chalifoux and Bob Russell respectively.

Everitt lost his seat to Progressive Conservative Ernie Jamison by a margin of just over a thousand votes in the 1971 election, as Peter Lougheed's Progressive Conservatives swept Social Credit from office. Everitt attempted a comeback in the 1975 election, but finished more than four thousand votes behind Jamison.

Everitt also served as a county councillor in Sturgeon from 1980 until 1992 and on the Sturgeon School Division's Board of Trustees from 1977 until 1986.

In 1981 he received an Energize Award from the Alberta department of Community Development for "outstanding contributions at the community or municipal level through a personal commitment to recreation development, a consistent and continuous record of service to the public, community leadership in recreation, and active participation in a variety of volunteer recreation activities." Everitt died on August 26, 2015, at the age of 92.
