= Regroupement artistique francophone de l'Alberta =

Arts organization in Alberta

- Formation: 2001; 25 years ago
- Type: Nonprofit
- Location: Edmonton, Alberta, Canada
- Website: https://www.rafa-alberta.ca/lerafa.ca/coup-doeil/index.php

The Regroupement artistique francophone de l'Alberta (RAFA) is a non-profit arts organization that advocates and organizes programs for Francophone artists in Alberta. It is based at La Cité Francophone in Bonnie Doon neighborhood in Edmonton.

RAFA was founded in 2001 and incorporated in 2002, when it became an official representative body for Franco-Albertan artistic and cultural workers. In 2003, it became a member of the Fédération culturelle canadienne-française, and the Alberta Foundation for the Arts officially recognized it as a provincial arts organization. In 2004, it began offering prizes for artistic creation and promotion. In 2005, RAFA began offering its first consultations to artists on developing their professional career. From 2006 to 2024, the director of RAFA was Sylvie Thériault. After she stepped down, musician Raphaël Freynet was selected as her replacement.

RAFA now counts more than 100 artists and organizations among its members. It represents artists in six domains: singing, theater, visual arts, media arts, literature, and dance. It offers four prizes every year: the Prix Sylvie-Van-Brabant for excellence in artistic creation, the Prix Martin-Lavoie for excellence in artistic promotion, the Prix Envol for early- or mid-career artists with exceptional achievements in the preceding year, and the Prix Lumière for late-career artists who inspired younger artists. In addition, it organizes numerous mentoring and networking programs to help community members meet each other and develop their skills.
