= Magali Michelet =

French-Canadian journalist and author

Magali Michelet was a Franco-Albertan journalist and author, who wrote articles for the Coin féminin of the Courrier de l'Ouest between 1906 and 1916. It was one of the few French-language journals in the Canadian West at the time. She was born in France in 1883 or 1889 and immigrated to Calmette, near Legal, Alberta, in 1905, the same year the region was separated from the North-West Territories. Her brother, Charles-Alexandre, was the editor of the Courrier de l'Ouest.

After the paper closed in 1916, Michelet taught French and continued to write. She returned with her family to southern France in 1922, where she published several books.

Michelet's articles were usually two or three columns in the middle pages of the paper. They often described the everyday experiences of Franco-Albertan women on the prairies. In 1907, a Petit Courrier section was added, in which Michelet published and responded to letters from local women and others. This space allowed women who felt isolated on remote prairie farms to connect with one another. The letters usually concerned traditionally feminine subjects like domestic life, education and relationships. In later years, the column allowed Michelet to express her views on social feminism. She rejected women's entrance into politics, but ultimately saw it as necessary given the political context of the time. The column also discussed topics like temperance and the dower.
