= Prosper-Edmond Lessard =

Canadian politician (1873–1931)

The Honourable Prosper-Edmond Lessard
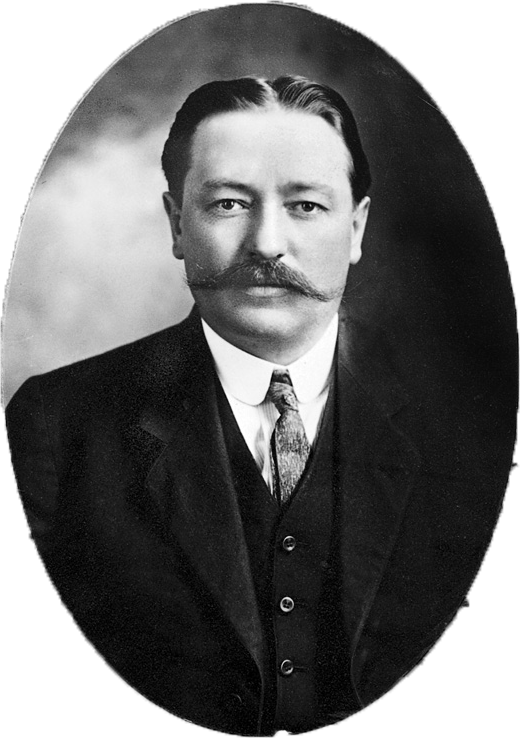

Member of the Legislative Assembly of Alberta for Pakan
- In office March 22, 1909 – March 25, 1913
- Preceded by: New district
- Succeeded by: District abolished
- In office March 25, 1913 – July 18, 1921
- Preceded by: New District
- Succeeded by: Laudas Joly
- Constituency: St. Paul

Canadian Senator from Alberta
- In office September 5, 1925 – April 11, 1931

Personal details
- Born: February 3, 1873 Cranbourne, Quebec, Canada
- Died: April 11, 1931 (aged 58) St. Paul, Alberta, Canada
- Party: Alberta Liberal Party; Liberal Party of Canada

Military service
- Allegiance: Canada
- Branch/service: Primary Reserve (Militia)
- Rank: Captain
- Unit: The Alberta Mounted Rifles

Prosper-Edmond Lessard (February 3, 1873 – April 11, 1931) was a Canadian businessman, militia officer and politician. He served as a member of the Legislative Assembly of Alberta from 1909 to 1921 sitting with the Liberal caucus in government. He also served in the Senate of Canada from 1925 to his death in 1931 sitting with the federal Liberal caucus.

== Early life ==
Lessard was born on February 3, 1873, in Cranbourne, Quebec, to Jean-Prosper Lessard and Annie Campbell Davidson. Lessard studied commerce and sciences at Collège du Mont-Saint-Louis in the mid-1890s and worked as a bookkeeper in Montreal following the completion of his studies. He left home seeking his fortune in the 1898 Klondike Gold Rush, stopping in Edmonton on his way there and went on to become a leading citizen in the Franco-Albertan community. Lessard began working as a bookkeeper for fellow Quebecers Joseph Chénier and Joseph-Hormidas Gariépy, and would later purchase Chénier's shares to partner with Gariépy to form a firm under the name Gariépy and Lessard between 1901 and April 1909.

Lessard would serve on Edmonton's Board of Trade, formed a number of companies including Imperial Agencies, and served as an executive on a number of resource extraction companies including Elk Park Oil Company, Western Timber and Mines Company, and Edmonton Iron Works. In the civics world Lessard would serve as secretary-treasurer of Edmonton's Young Men's Liberal Club, Edmonton's Liberal Association, and launched Le Courrier de l'Ouest a French language paper with Philippe Roy which reached a circulation of 8,000. He would also serve as a trustee of the Edmonton Separate-School Board between 1907 and 1910.

== Political career ==
Lessard ran for a seat to the Alberta Legislature in the 1909 Alberta general election as a Liberal candidate. He won the new Pakan electoral district by acclamation. He would be sworn into Premier Alexander Cameron Rutherford's cabinet as a Minister without portfolio, which he would hold until Rutherford's resignation in May 1910 due to the Alberta and Great Waterways Railway Scandal.

The 1913 boundary redistribution saw the Pakan district abolished. Lessard ran for re-election in the new St. Paul electoral district in the election held that year. He won a closely contested two-way race over Conservative candidate Laurent Garneau, former pioneer in the Garneau district of Edmonton.

Lessard ran for a third term in the 1917 general election. He received 66 percent of the vote to keep his seat, defeating Conservative opponent James Brady, a Metis activist and the subject of the biography One-and-a-half Men.

Lessard ran for re-election again in the 1921 Alberta general election. He was defeated by United Farmers candidate Laudas Joly in a closely contested two-way race. Many other Liberal members also lost their seas in this election, as the United Farmers formed a majority government.

In 1925 Lessard was appointed to the Senate of Canada on the advice of Prime Minister Mackenzie King. Lessard served in the Senate until his death in his St. Paul home on April 11, 1931, at the age of 58.

== Lessard mansion ==
Lessard's 1913 unique downtown Edmonton area home on 100th Avenue and 119th Street was declared a Municipal Historical Resource by the City of Edmonton, however the home was demolished in 2005 to make way for a six-storey condo complex.

== Personal life ==
Lessard married Hélène Gariépy, the daughter of Edmonton Alderman and Merchant Joseph Hormidas Gariépy on November 25, 1900, in Edmonton, together they had three daughters and two sons.

Lessard would collaborate with J. H. Picard, Léonidas-Alcidas Giroux, and R.‑A. Blais to create the Société de la Colonisation de l’Alberta in September 1912, to support the growth of Alberta's French population by advertising the province's agricultural potential.
