= John Delisle =

Canadian politician

John Amos Delisle
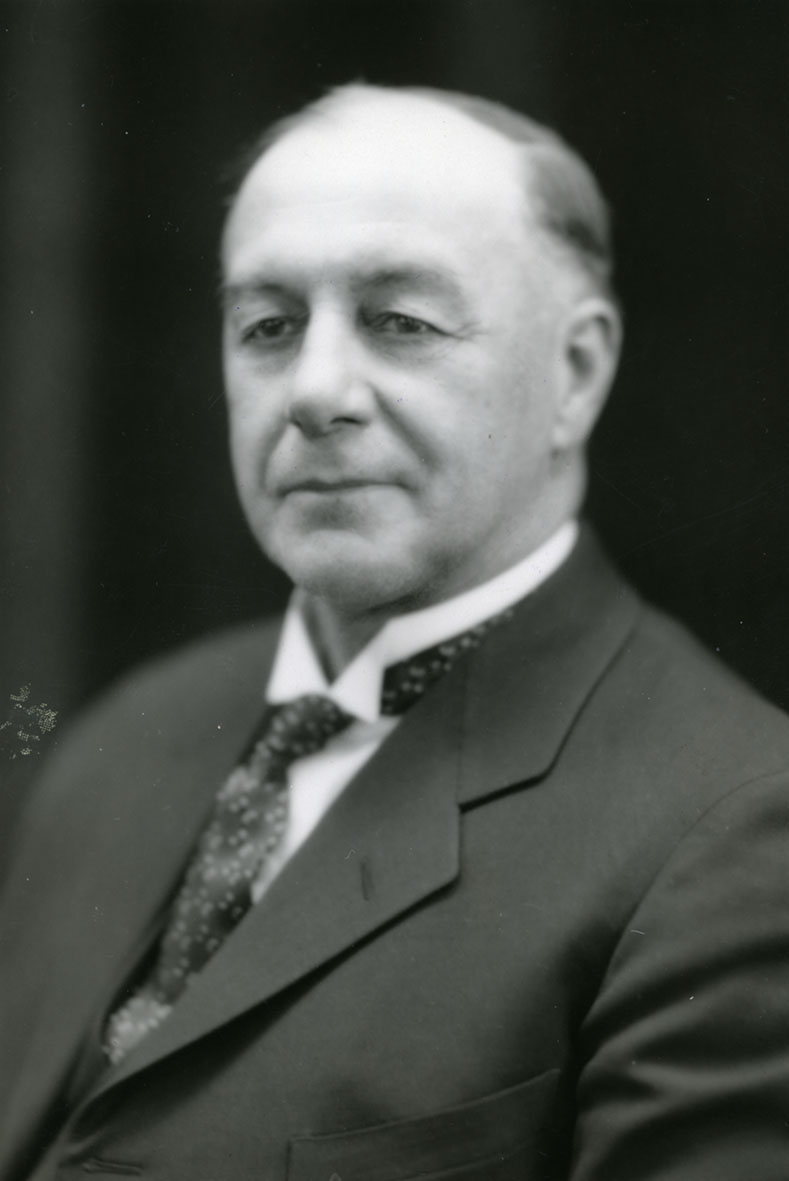

Member of the Legislative Assembly of Alberta
- In office June 28, 1926 – August 21, 1930
- Preceded by: Joseph Dechene
- Succeeded by: Henry Dakin
- Constituency: Beaver River

Personal details
- Born: November 24, 1871 North Hoadley, Massachusetts
- Died: December 27, 1940 (aged 69) St. Paul, Alberta
- Party: United Farmers
- Occupation: politician

John Amos Delisle (November 24, 1871 – December 27, 1940) is a former provincial politician from Alberta, Canada. He served as a member of the Legislative Assembly of Alberta from 1926 to 1930 sitting with the United Farmers caucus in government.

== Political career ==
Delisle ran for a seat to the Alberta Legislature in the 1926 Alberta general election. He ran as the United Farmers of Alberta candidate in the electoral district of Beaver River. Delisle defeated incumbent Joseph Dechene to pick up the seat for his party.

Delisle ran for a second term in the 1930 Alberta general election. The Beaver River district was the most closely contested race that year. On the first vote count Delisle finished seven votes ahead of Liberal candidate Henry Dakin, with the Independent candidate taking a few as well. With no one having a majority in the first count, the vote went to a second count. The second choice ballots of Independent candidate Luc Lebel were counted, and Delisle was declared the winner by 21 votes. The Liberal party challenged the results in court. On August 21, 1930 Judge Taylor conducted a judicial recount and declared Dakin elected by four votes.

Delisle attempted to win his seat back by running against Dakin for the second time in the 1935 Alberta general election. He and Dakin (and a Conservative candidate) were defeated, finishing second, third and fourth in the four way race, losing to Social Credit candidate Lucien Maynard.

He died of a heart attack in 1940.
