= St. Albert (provincial electoral district) =

Provincial electoral district in Alberta, Canada

Coordinates: 53.64°N 113.63°W

Alberta electoral district
- St. Albert within the Edmonton Metropolitan Region, 2017 boundaries.

Provincial electoral district
- Legislature: Legislative Assembly of Alberta
MLA
Marie Renaud
New Democratic
- District created: 1905
- First contested: 1905
- Last contested: 2023

St. Albert (styled Saint Albert from 1905 to 1909) is a provincial electoral district in Alberta, Canada. The district is one of 87 current districts mandated to return a single member to the Legislative Assembly of Alberta. The riding encompasses the majority, but not all of, the bedroom community of St. Albert.

== History ==
The St. Albert electoral district was one of the original 25 electoral districts contested in the 1905 Alberta general election upon Alberta becoming a province in September 1905. The district was carried over from the old St. Albert electoral district, which returned a member to the Legislative Assembly of the Northwest Territories from 1891 to 1905. The district stretched from the city of St. Albert west to the British Columbia border. The riding was renamed in 1909 and has shrunk in size many times since, eventually becoming an urban riding.

Along with the Peace River district, St. Albert is one of two provincial electoral districts that has existed since 1905. While Peace river is often described as a bellwether, St. Albert has historically functioned as a swing riding with low incumbent retention. New candidates from an incumbent party have held the seat only twice after an incumbent MLA left office, and only two MLAs have won a third term.

=== Boundary history ===
76 St. Albert 2003 boundaries
Bordering districts
North	East	West	South
Athabasca-Redwater	Edmonton-Castle Downs	Spruce Grove-Sturgeon-St. Albert	Edmonton-Calder
riding map goes here			
Legal description from the Statutes of Alberta 2003, Electoral Divisions Act.
Starting at the intersection of the west boundary of the St. Albert city boundary and the centre line of the Canadian National Railway; then 1. easterly along the centre line to the east boundary of river lot 20 as show on plan 5126 T.R.; 2. northerly along the east boundary to the centre line of McKenney Avenue; 3. easterly along the centre line of McKenney Avenue to the centre line of St. Albert Road; 4. northerly along the centre line of St. Albert Road to the centre line of Highway 2; 5. northerly along the centre line of Highway 2 to the northerly boundary of the St. Albert city boundary; 6. in a generally easterly, southerly, westerly and northerly direction along the St. Albert city boundary to the starting point.
Note:

80 St. Albert 2010 boundaries
Bordering districts
North	East	West	South
Athabasca-Sturgeon-Redwater	Edmonton-Calder	Spruce Grove-St. Albert	Edmonton-Calder
Legal description from the Statutes of Alberta 2010, Electoral Divisions Act.
Legal description from the Statutes of Alberta 2003, Electoral Divisions Act.
Note: The district remained unchanged in 2010.

Historically, the riding has included the city of St. Albert and rural areas to the north and west. In Alberta's first election in 1905, the riding stretched to the border with British Columbia.

As the city grew in population, the riding shrank to include less rural voters. By 1993, the boundaries of the riding matched the city boundaries. From 1997 onwards, the riding has not included all of the city of St. Albert.

The 2010 boundary redistribution kept the riding boundaries exactly the same as the 2003 boundary redistribution. The 2017 redistribution saw its boundaries shift slightly to the west.

=== Representation history ===
St. Albert
Assembly	Years	Member	Party
Riding created from St. Albert (N.W.T.)
1st	1905–1909	Henry McKenney	Independent Liberal
2nd	1909–1913	Lucien Boudreau	Liberal
3rd	1913–1917	Lucien Boudreau	Liberal
4th	1917–1921	Lucien Boudreau	Liberal
5th	1921–1926	Télesphore St. Arnaud	United Farmers
6th	1926–1926	Lucien Boudreau	Liberal
6th	1926–1926	Vacant	Vacant
6th	1926–1930	Lucien Boudreau	Liberal
7th	1930–1934	Omer St. Germain	United Farmers
7th	1934–1935	Omer St. Germain	Liberal
8th	1935–1940	Charles Holder	Social Credit
9th	1940–1944	Lionel Tellier	Independent
10th	1944–1948	Charles Holder	Social Credit
11th	1948–1952	Lucien Maynard	Social Credit
12th	1952–1955	Lucien Maynard	Social Credit
13th	1955–1959	Arthur Soetaert	Liberal
14th	1959–1963	Keith Everitt	Social Credit
15th	1963–1967	Keith Everitt	Social Credit
16th	1967–1971	Keith Everitt	Social Credit
17th	1971–1975	Ernie Jamison	Progressive Conservative
18th	1975–1979	Ernie Jamison	Progressive Conservative
19th	1979–1982	Myrna Fyfe	Progressive Conservative
20th	1982–1986	Myrna Fyfe	Progressive Conservative
21st	1986–1989	Bryan Strong	New Democratic
22nd	1989–1993	Dick Fowler	Progressive Conservative
23rd	1993–1997	Len Bracko	Liberal
24th	1997–2001	Mary O'Neill	Progressive Conservative
25th	2001–2004	Mary O'Neill	Progressive Conservative
26th	2004–2008	Jack Flaherty	Liberal
27th	2008–2012	Ken Allred	Progressive Conservative
28th	2012–2015	Stephen Khan	Progressive Conservative
29th	2015–2019	Marie Renaud	New Democratic
30th	2019–2023	Marie Renaud	New Democratic
31st	2023–Present	Marie Renaud	New Democratic

The electoral district was created in 1905 when the province was founded. The election contest held that year was a hotly contested race between Liberal candidate Lucien Boudreau and Independent Liberal Henry McKenney. In the end the result was very close with McKenney winning by just eight votes. Despite being elected as an independent, McKenney was a supporter of the Rutherford government and caucused with the Liberals.

McKenney stayed in the St. Albert district seat only for a single term. He decided to run in the Pembina district in the 1909 election. Boudreau ran again that year and this time won a hotly contested race over future MLAs Wilfrid Gariépy and Omer St. Germain. Boudreau was re-elected in 1913 and 1917, facing Conservative candidate Hector Landry both times and winning with comfortable majorities.

Boudreau ran for a fourth term in the 1921 election. He was defeated by United Farmers candidate Telesphore St. Arnaud.

From 1924 to 1956, the district used instant-runoff voting to elect its MLA.

Boudreau ran again in the 1926 election. He came in first in the first round of counting but did not have a majority of votes. After two vote transfers from eliminated candidates, he won the district seat. Boudreau was removed from office on November 18, 1926, after a court convicted Boudreau of bribery and corruption. Boudreau appealed and was re-instated on December 8, 1926.

The 1930 general election saw Omer St. Germain run in a straight fight against Boudreau. They had run against each other back in 1909. St. Germain won to retake the seat for the United Farmers.

St. Germain crossed the floor to the Liberals on February 6, 1934. He ran for re-election in a hotly contested race against four other candidates in the 1935 election. He came in third on the first ballot and ended up being defeated by Social Credit candidate Charles Holder after rounds of vote transfers. Holder only lasted one term in office. He ran in the 1940 general election but was defeated by Independent candidate Lionel Tellier.

Tellier did not run again in the 1944 general election. Charles Holder made a comeback and regained the seat for Social Credit. Holder retired from politics in 1948. Social Credit MLA Lucien Maynard moved to St. Albert from the Beaver River electoral district and won, to hold the St. Albert seat for the SC party. He was re-elected in the 1952 election.

The 1955 election was won by Liberal candidate Arthur Soetaert, who defeated Maynard. He only lasted one term, being defeated in the 1959 general election by Social Credit candidate Keith Everitt. The 1963 and 1967 elections saw Everitt hold the district. He was defeated in the 1971 general election by Progressive Conservative candidate Ernest Jamison.

Jamison was re-elected in the 1975 general election. He was defeated when running for the Progressive Conservative nomination in 1979.Myrna Fyfe won the nomination and went on to capture the seat in the 1979 general election for the P-C party.

Fyfe ran for re-election in 1982 and won the largest majority (54.6 percent) in the history of the district. She ran for a third term in the 1986 general election but was defeated by NDP candidate Bryan Strong in a hotly contested race.

Strong held the seat only for a single term, choosing not to run in the 1989 general election. Progressive Conservative Dick Fowler picked up the seat for his party. Fowler ran for a second term in the 1993 election but was defeated by Liberal candidate Len Bracko.

Bracko himself only lasted a single term in the seat. He was defeated in the 1997 general election by Progressive Conservative candidate Mary O'Neill in the closest race of the election, winning by just 16 votes. O'Neill was re-elected in the 2001 general election.

The 2004 general election saw Liberal candidate Jack Flaherty regain the seat for the Liberals as Mary O'Neill went down to defeat. Flaherty only held the seat for one term, as the riding swung back into the Progressive Conservative column when candidate Ken Allred won a strong majority (54 percent).

== Legislative election results ==
=== 1905 ===
1905 Alberta general election results		Turnout N/A		Swing	
Affiliation	Candidate	Votes	%	Party	Personal
Independent Liberal	Henry McKenney	407	51.00%	*	
Liberal	Lucien Boudreau	391	49.00%	*	
Total		798			
Rejected, spoiled and declined		Unknown			
Eligible electors / Turnout		Unknown	%		
Independent Liberal pickup new district				Swing N/A	

=== 1909 ===
1909 Alberta general election results		Turnout N/A		Swing	
Affiliation	Candidate	Votes	%	Party	Personal
Liberal	Lucien Boudreau	528	50.97%	37.90%	1.97%
Liberal	Wilfrid Gariépy	393	37.93%	37.90%	*
Independent Liberal	Omer St. Germain	115	11.10%	*	
Total		1,036			
Rejected, spoiled and declined		Unknown			
Eligible electors / Turnout		Unknown	%		
Liberal pickup from Independent Liberal				Swing 19.95%	

The 1909 general election saw incumbent Henry McKenney run for re-election in the new electoral district of Pembina as the boundaries of the St. Albert electoral district were significantly changed in the 1909 boundary redistribution.

A meeting was held on March 1, 1909, in Morinville to hear from candidates interested in the nomination for the provincial Liberals. The meeting was very well attended with over 400 delegates. The three candidates were Mayor of St. Albert Lucien Boudreau who was the runner up in the 1905 election as well as Omer St. Germain a farmer from Morinville and Wilfrid Gariépy an Alderman in Edmonton.

Gariépy was presented with a petition of over 500 electors in the constituency of St. Albert requesting him to be the Liberal candidate. The names on the petition added up to two thirds of the voter list in the constituency at the time and made a nomination convention unnecessary. He accepted the request and after a two-hour speech declared his candidacy as a straight supporter of the Rutherford government.

At the meeting Boudreau said he was determined to be nominated by convention and St. Germain said he would probably be a candidate. A nominating convention was called on March 6, 1909, and once again held in the town of Morinville. This meeting was only attended by 54 delegates.

Gariépy had pressing business to attend in Edmonton the day of the convention and had asked two representatives to speak on his behalf, they told the convention delegates that Gariépy would not allow his name to go before the convention and that he would choose to contest the election independently of it. St. Germain told the convention that if they chose Boudreau he would retire from the race in his favor. Boudreau was acclaimed by the convention.

The provincial Conservatives had nominated Lucien Dubuc who had run in the previous election in the Peace River electoral district. He was nominated without a convention. He dropped out of the race before the nomination deadline. St. Germain joined the race late as another Independent Liberal candidate after Dubuc retired. By the end of the campaign all three candidates in the race were Rutherford supporters and running as straight Liberals.

Lucien Boudreau won the race taking over half the popular vote on election night, while Gariépy finished a strong second but failed to win the votes of all those that signed the petition for his candidacy. St. Germain finished a distant third.

=== 1913 ===
1913 Alberta general election results		Turnout 74.10%		Swing	
Affiliation	Candidate	Votes	%	Party	Personal
Liberal	Lucien Boudreau	620	60.55%	-28.35%	9.58%
Conservative	Hector Landry	404	39.45%	*	
Total		1,024			
Rejected, spoiled and declined		Unknown			
Eligible electors / Turnout		1,382	%		
Liberal hold				Swing -24.52%	

=== 1917 ===
1917 Alberta general election results		Turnout 75.60%		Swing	
Affiliation	Candidate	Votes	%	Party	Personal
Liberal	Lucien Boudreau	1,095	59.61%	-0.94%	
Conservative	Hector Landry	742	40.39%	0.94%	
Total		1,837			
Rejected, spoiled and declined		0			
Eligible electors / Turnout		2,430	%		
Liberal hold				Swing -0.94%	

=== 1921 ===
1921 Alberta general election results		Turnout 76.80%		Swing	
Affiliation	Candidate	Votes	%	Party	Personal
United Farmers	Télesphore St. Arnaud	1,234	55.24%		
Liberal	Lucien Boudreau	1,000	44.76%	-14.85%	
Total		2,234			
Rejected, spoiled and declined		0			
Eligible electors / Turnout		2,909	%		
United Farmers gain from Liberal		Swing		35.05%	

=== 1926 ===
1926 Alberta general election
Party	Candidate	Votes 1st count	%	Votes final count	%	±%
Liberal	Lucien Boudreau	1,058	43.11%	1,174	57.07%	-1.65%
Independent Liberal	Michael Hogan	683	27.83%	883	42.93%	
United Farmers	Louis Normandeau	628	25.59%	–	–	-29.65%
Conservative	J.A. Loiseau	85	3.47%	–	–	
Total		2,454	2,057			
Rejected, spoiled and declined		119				
Eligible electors / Turnout		3,047	84.44%			
Liberal gain from United Farmers		Swing		-14.74%		
Source: "St. Albert Official Results 1926 Alberta general election". Alberta Heritage Community Foundation.

=== 1930 ===
1930 Alberta general election results		Turnout 80.02%		Swing	
Affiliation	Candidate	Votes	%	Party	Personal
United Farmers	Omer St. Germain	1,427	55.14%	29.55%	
Liberal	Lucien Boudreau	1,161	44.86%	1.75%	
Total		2,588			
Rejected, spoiled and declined		91			
Eligible electors / Turnout		3,348	%		
United Farmers gain from Liberal		Swing		15.65%	

=== 1935 ===
1935 Alberta general election results		Turnout 84.13%						1st Count Swing	
Affiliation	Candidate	1st	%	2nd	3rd	4th	%	Party	Personal
Social Credit	Charles Holder	1,431	44.63%			1,619	52.84%	*	
Independent Liberal	Lucien Boudreau	955	29.79%			1,445	47.16%	*	-15.07%
Liberal	Omer St. Germain	446	13.91%					-30.95%	-41.23%
Independent Conservative	A.S. McRae	258	8.05%					*	
United Farmers	J.P. Morissey	116	3.62%					-51.52%	*
Total		3,206	100%	?	?	3,064	100%		
Exhausted Ballots		0		?	?	?			
Rejected, spoiled and declined		119							
3,811 Eligible Electors
Social Credit pickup from Liberal							1st Count Swing 29.85%		

=== 1940 ===
Independent Tellier came from behind to win the seat due to transfers conducted under the IRV rules.

1940 Alberta general election results		Turnout 71.85%						1st Count Swing		
Affiliation	Candidate	1st	%	2nd	3rd	4th	%	Party	Personal	*
Social Credit	Charles Holder	1,703	35.40%			2,158	47.81%	-9.23%		
Independent	Lionel Tellier	1,467	30.49%			2,356	52.19%			
Liberal	J.H. Perras	1,089	22.64%					8.73%	*	
Co-operative Commonwealth	W.R. Rigney	552	11.47%					*		
Total		4,811	100%	?	?	4,514	100%			
Exhausted Ballots		0		?	?	?				
Rejected, spoiled and declined		Unknown								
6,696 Eligible Electors
Independent pickup from Social Credit							1st Count Swing 19.86%			

=== 1944 ===
1944 Alberta general election results		Turnout 68.46%				1st Count Swing		
Affiliation	Candidate	1st	%	2nd	%	Party	Personal	
Social Credit	Charles Holder	2,097	49.49%	2,491	64.74%	14.09%		
Co-operative Commonwealth	Co-operative Commonwealth	Earl Toane	1,222	28.84%	1,357	35.26%	17.37%	*
Independent	Joseph Nadeau	918	21.67%			*		
Total		4,237	100%	3,848	100%			
Exhausted Ballots		0		389				
Rejected, spoiled and declined		119						
6,319 Eligible Electors
Social Credit pickup from Independent					1st Count Swing 15.73%			

=== 1948 ===
1948 Alberta general election results		Turnout 69.94%		Swing	
Affiliation	Candidate	Votes	%	Party	Personal
Social Credit	Lucien Maynard	2,702	59.74%	10.25%	
Co-operative Commonwealth	Joseph Dusseault	1,047	23.15%	-5.69%	*
Liberal	Omer St. Germain	774	17.11%	*	
Total		4,523			
Rejected, spoiled and declined		260			
Eligible electors / Turnout		6,839	%		
Social Credit hold		Swing		7.97%	

=== 1952 ===
1952 Alberta general election results		Turnout 70.63%				1st Count Swing	
Affiliation	Candidate	1st	%	2nd	%	Party	Personal
Social Credit	Lucien Maynard	2,218	44.31%	2,420	54.52%	-15.43%	
Liberal	Arthur Soetaert	1,496	29.88%	2,019	45.48%	12.77%	*
Co-operative Commonwealth	Co-operative Commonwealth	Joseph Dusseault	1,292	25.81%			2.66%
Total		5,006	100%	4,439	100%		
Exhausted Ballots		0		567			
Rejected, spoiled and declined		337					
7,565 Eligible Electors
Social Credit hold					1st Count Swing -14.10%		

=== 1955 ===
1955 Alberta general election
Party	Candidate	Votes 1st count	%	Votes final count	%	±%
Liberal	Arthur Soetaert	2,618	44.13%	3,029	53.72%	14.25%
Social Credit	Lucien Maynard	2,509	42.30%	2,610	46.28%	-2.01%
Independent	Joseph Dusseault	575	9.69%	–	–	-16.12%
Progressive Conservative	Jack Zubick	159	2.68%	–	–	n/a
Independent	Aubrey Smith	71	1.20%	–	–	n/a
Total		5,932	100%	5,639	100%	
Rejected, spoiled and declined		299				
Eligible Electors / Turnout		7,824	79.64%			
Liberal gain from Social Credit		Swing		8.13%		
Source: "St. Albert Results 1955 Alberta general election". Alberta Heritage Community Foundation.

=== 1959 ===
1959 Alberta general election results		Turnout 62.74%		Swing	
Affiliation	Candidate	Votes	%	Party	Personal
Social Credit	Keith Everitt	2,157	36.57%	-5.73%	
Liberal	Arthur Soetaert	2,082	35.29%	-8.84%	
Progressive Conservative	Stanley Walker	1,187	20.12%	17.44%	
Co-operative Commonwealth	Co-operative Commonwealth	Earl Toane	473	8.02%	*
Total		5,899			
Rejected, spoiled and declined		47			
Eligible electors / Turnout		9,477	%		
Social Credit pickup from Liberal				Swing -7.29%	

=== 1963 ===
1963 Alberta general election results		Turnout 55.37%		Swing	
Affiliation	Candidate	Votes	%	Party	Personal
Social Credit	Keith Everitt	2,540	39.98%	3.41%	
Liberal	Louis Chalifoux	2,030	31.95%	-3.34%	
Progressive Conservative	Alan Lazerte	1,332	20.97%	0.85%	
New Democratic	Alan Bevington	451	7.10%	-0.92%	
Total		6,353			
Rejected, spoiled and declined		21			
Eligible electors / Turnout		11,511	%		
Social Credit hold		Swing		3.38%	

=== 1967 ===
1967 Alberta general election results		Turnout 63.85%		Swing	
Affiliation	Candidate	Votes	%	Party	Personal
Social Credit	Keith Everitt	2,824	35.62%	-4.36%	
Liberal	Robert Russell	2,297	28.97%	-2.98%	
Progressive Conservative	Stanley Walker	1,469	18.52%	-2.45%	
New Democratic	Norman Dolman	1,339	16.89%	9.79%	
Total		7,929			
Rejected, spoiled and declined		40			
Eligible electors / Turnout		12,480	%		
Social Credit hold		Swing		-3.67%	

=== 1971 ===
1971 Alberta general election results		Turnout 70.20%		Swing	
Affiliation	Candidate	Votes	%	Party	Personal
Progressive Conservative	William Jamison	4,623	42.99%	24.47%	
Social Credit	Keith Everitt	3,592	33.40%	-2.22%	
Liberal	Robert Russell	1,660	15.44%	-13.53%	
New Democratic	Elsie McMillan	878	8.17%	-1.62%	
Total		10,753			
Rejected, spoiled and declined		14			
Eligible electors / Turnout		15,337	%		
Progressive Conservative gain from Social Credit		Swing		13.35%	

=== 1975 ===
1975 Alberta general election results		Turnout 52.20%		Swing	
Affiliation	Candidate	Votes	%	Party	Personal
Progressive Conservative	William Jamison	6,450	54.54%	11.55%	
Social Credit	Keith Everitt	2,221	18.78%	-14.62%	
New Democratic	Earl Toane	1,591	13.45%	5.28%	
Liberal	John Bakker	1,564	13.23%	-2.21%	
Total		11,826			
Rejected, spoiled and declined		48			
Eligible electors / Turnout		22,749	%		
Progressive Conservative hold		Swing		13.08%	

=== 1979 ===
1979 Alberta general election results		Turnout 57.80%		Swing	
Affiliation	Candidate	Votes	%	Party	Personal
Progressive Conservative	Myrna Fyfe	9,361	58.85%	4.31%	
New Democratic	Robert Borreson	3,178	19.98%	6.53%	
Social Credit	Reginald Petch	1,686	10.60%	-8.18%	
Liberal	Gerry Thibault	1,681	10.57%	-2.66%	
Total		15,906			
Rejected, spoiled and declined		47			
Eligible electors / Turnout		27,602	%		
Progressive Conservative hold		Swing		5.42%	

=== 1982 ===
1982 Alberta general election results		Turnout 68.10%		Swing	
Affiliation	Candidate	Votes	%	Party	Personal
Progressive Conservative	Myrna Fyfe	12,982	54.72%	-4.13%	
New Democratic	Kurt Hoeberg	4,438	18.71%	-1.27%	
Independent	William Jamison	3,406	14.36%	*	
Western Canada Concept	Murray Sillito	2,465	10.39%	*	
Social Credit	L.D. Callfas	434	1.82%	-8.78%	
Total		23,725			
Rejected, spoiled and declined		50			
Eligible electors / Turnout		34,910	%		
Progressive Conservative hold		Swing		-2.70%	

=== 1986 ===
1986 Alberta general election results		Turnout 50.17%		Swing	
Affiliation	Candidate	Votes	%	Party	Personal
New Democratic	Bryan Strong	4,700	41.81%	23.10%	
Progressive Conservative	Myrna Fyfe	4,580	40.75%	-13.97%	
Representative	William Jamison	1,215	10.81%	-3.55%	
Liberal	Thomas Droege	745	6.62%	*	
Total		11,240			
Rejected, spoiled and declined		12			
Eligible electors / Turnout		22,429	%		
NDP pickup from Progressive Conservative				Swing 18.54%	

=== 1989 ===
1989 Alberta general election results		Turnout 58.98%		Swing	
Affiliation	Candidate	Votes	%	Party	Personal
Progressive Conservative	Dick Fowler	6,590	45.24%	4.49%	
Liberal	Len Bracko	4,278	29.37%	22.75%	
New Democratic	Cheryl Wharton	3,552	24.38%	-17.43%	
Independent	Archie Baldwin	147	1.01%	*	
Total		14,567			
Rejected, spoiled and declined		12			
Eligible electors / Turnout		24,718	%		
Progressive Conservative gain from New Democratic		Swing		13.62%	

=== 1993 ===
1993 Alberta general election results		Turnout 61.91%		Swing					
Affiliation	Candidate	Votes	%	Party	Personal				
Liberal	Len Bracko	7,267	51.02%	21.65%					
Progressive Conservative	Dick Fowler	5,746	40.34%	-4.90%					
New Democratic	John Booth	1,031	7.24%	-17.14% #E6E6FA	Natural Law	Gordon Rever	199	1.40%	*
Total		14,243							
Rejected, spoiled and declined		12							
Eligible electors / Turnout		23,045	%						
Liberal pickup from Progressive Conservative				Swing 13.28%					

=== 1997 ===
1997 Alberta general election results		Turnout 60.97%		Swing	
Affiliation	Candidate	Votes	%	Party	Personal
Progressive Conservative	Mary O'Neill	6,696	43.61%	3.27%	
Liberal	Len Bracko	6,680	43.50%	-7.52%	
New Democratic	Chris Samuel	1,198	7.80%	0.56%	
Social Credit	John Reil	781	5.09%	*	
Total		15,355			
Rejected, spoiled and declined		27			
Eligible electors / Turnout		25,227	%		
Progressive Conservative gain from Liberal		Swing		5.40%	

=== 2001 ===
2001 Alberta general election results		Turnout 63.99%		Swing	
Affiliation	Candidate	Votes	%	Party	Personal
Progressive Conservative	Mary O'Neill	9,537	52.58%	8.97%	
Liberal	Len Bracko	7,479	41.23%	-2.27%	
New Democratic	Michelle Mungall	1,122	6.19%	-1.61%	
Total		18,138			
Rejected, spoiled and declined		63			
Eligible electors / Turnout		28,444	%		
Progressive Conservative hold		Swing		5.62%	

=== 2004 ===
2004 Alberta general election results		Turnout 52.79%		Swing	
Affiliation	Candidate	Votes	%	Party	Personal
Liberal	Jack Flaherty	6,476	42.64%	1.41%	
Progressive Conservative	Mary O'Neill	6,062	39.91%	-12.67%	
New Democratic	Travis Thompson	1,652	10.88%	4.69%	
Alberta Alliance	Michaela Meldrum	591	3.89%		
Green	Conrad Bitangcol	407	2.68%	*	
Total		15,188	100%		
Rejected, spoiled and declined		54			
28,872 Eligible Electors
Liberal pickup from Progressive Conservative				Swing 7.04%	

=== 2008 ===
2008 Alberta general election results		Turnout 44.74%		Swing	
Affiliation	Candidate	Votes	%	Party	Personal
Progressive Conservative	Ken Allred	8,403	54.09%	14.18%	
Liberal	Jack Flaherty	5,598	36.03%	-6.61%	
New Democratic	Kathy Campbell	959	6.17%	-4.71%	
Green	Ross Vincent	576	3.71%	1.03%	*
Total		15,536	100%		
Rejected, spoiled and declined		94			
34,939 Eligible Electors
Progressive Conservative gain from Liberal		Swing		10.40%	

=== 2012 ===
2012 Alberta general election
Party	Candidate	Votes	%
Progressive Conservative	Stephen Khan	10,481	53.76
Wildrose	James Burrows	4,130	21.18
Liberal	Kim Bugeaud	2,011	10.31
New Democratic	Nicole Bownes	1,679	8.61
Alberta Party	Tim Osborne	1,195	6.13

=== 2015 ===
2015 Alberta general election
Party	Candidate	Votes	%
New Democratic	Marie Renaud	12,219	53.9
Progressive Conservative	Stephen Khan	6,343	28.0
Wildrose	Shelley Biermanski	2,854	12.6
Liberal	Bill Alton	778	3.4
Alberta Party	Trevor Love	492	2.2

=== 2019 ===
2019 Alberta general election
Party	Candidate	Votes	%	±%
New Democratic	Marie Renaud	12,336	46.2%	-7.7%
United Conservative	Jeff Wedman	10,682	40.0%	-0.6%
Alberta Party	Barry Bailey	2,817	10.6%	+8.4%
Liberal	Kevin McLean	317	1.2%	-2.2%
Green	Cameron Jefferies	229	0.9%	--
Independence	Sheldon Gron	172	0.6%	--
Alberta Advantage	Donald Petruka	139	0.5%	--
Total valid votes		26,692		
Rejected, spoiled, and declined		108	55	8
Registered electors and turnout		38,353	69.9%	
New Democratic hold		Swing		%
Source(s) "2019 Provincial General Election Results". Elections Alberta.

=== 2023 ===
2023 Alberta general election
Party	Candidate	Votes	%	±%
New Democratic	Marie Renaud	15,021	58.50	+12.29
United Conservative	Angela Wood	10,200	39.73	-0.29
Green	Cameron Jefferies	455	1.77	+0.91
Total		25,676	99.38	–
Rejected and declined		161	0.62	
Turnout		25,837	66.40	
Eligible voters		38,909		
New Democratic hold		Swing		+6.29
Source(s) Source: Elections Alberta

== Senate nominee election results ==
=== 2004 ===
2004 Senate nominee election results: St. Albert				Turnout 52.61%	
Affiliation	Candidate	Votes	% votes	% ballots	Rank
Progressive Conservative	Betty Unger	5,411	16.28%	49.84%	2
Independent	Link Byfield	4,464	13.43%	41.09%	4
Progressive Conservative	Bert Brown	3,823	11.50%	35.19%	1
Progressive Conservative	Cliff Breitkreuz	3,655	11.00%	33.65%	3
Independent	Tom Sindlinger	2,912	8.76%	26.81%	9
Alberta Alliance	Michael Roth	2,864	8.62%	26.37%	7
Progressive Conservative	David Usherwood	2,737	8.23%	25.20%	6
Alberta Alliance	Gary Horan	2,571	7.73%	23.67%	10
Alberta Alliance	Vance Gough	2,500	7.52%	23.01%	8
Progressive Conservative	Jim Silye	2,304	6.93%	21.21%	5
Total votes		33,241	100%		
Total ballots		10,863	3.06 votes per ballot		
Rejected, spoiled and declined		4,325			

Voters had the option of selecting four candidates on the ballot

== Plebiscite results ==
=== 1948 electrification plebiscite ===
District results from the first province wide plebiscite on electricity regulation.

Option A	Option B
Are you in favour of the generation and distribution of electricity being continued by the Power Companies?	Are you in favour of the generation and distribution of electricity being made a publicly owned utility administered by the Alberta Government Power Commission?
1,897 44.84%	2,333 55.16%
Province wide result: Option A passed.

=== 1957 liquor plebiscite ===
1957 Alberta liquor plebiscite results: St. Albert
Question A: Do you approve additional types of outlets for the sale of beer, wine and spirituous liquor subject to a local vote?
Ballot choice	Votes	%
Yes	2,546	70.27%
No	1,077	29.73%
Total votes	3,623	100%
Rejected, spoiled and declined	92	
8,184 eligible electors, turnout 45.39%

On October 30, 1957, a stand-alone plebiscite was held province wide in all 50 of the then current provincial electoral districts in Alberta. The government decided to consult Alberta voters to decide on liquor sales and mixed drinking after a divisive debate in the Legislature. The plebiscite was intended to deal with the growing demand for reforming antiquated liquor control laws.

The plebiscite was conducted in two parts. Question A asked in all districts, asked the voters if the sale of liquor should be expanded in Alberta, while Question B asked in a handful of districts within the corporate limits of Calgary and Edmonton asked if men and woman were allowed to drink together in establishments.

Province wide Question A of the plebiscite passed in 33 of the 50 districts while Question B passed in all five districts. St. Albert voted in favour of the proposal by a landslide majority. Voter turnout in the district was almost equal to the province wide average of 46%.

Official district returns were released to the public on December 31, 1957. The Social Credit government in power at the time did not considered the results binding. However the results of the vote led the government to repeal all existing liquor legislation and introduce an entirely new Liquor Act.

Municipal districts lying inside electoral districts that voted against the Plebiscite were designated Local Option Zones by the Alberta Liquor Control Board and considered effective dry zones, business owners that wanted a license had to petition for a binding municipal plebiscite in order to be granted a license.

== Nomination contests ==
UCP St. Albert nomination contest: November 26, 2022

Candidate
Candidate	Votes	%
Angela Wood	253	78.6
Melissa Crane	69	21.4
Total	322	100.0

== Student vote results ==
=== 2004 ===
Participating schools
Neil M. Ross Elementary School
Paul Kane High School
Richard Fowler Junior High School
St. Albert Catholic High School
VJ Maloney Catholic Junior High School

On November 19, 2004, a student vote was conducted at participating Alberta schools to parallel the 2004 Alberta general election results. The vote was designed to educate students and simulate the electoral process for persons who have not yet reached the legal majority. The vote was conducted in 80 of the 83 provincial electoral districts with students voting for actual election candidates. Schools with a large student body that reside in another electoral district had the option to vote for candidates outside of the electoral district then where they were physically located.

2004 Alberta student vote results
Affiliation	Candidate	Votes	%
Liberal	Jack Flaherty	303	32.13%
Progressive Conservative	Mary O'Neill	254	26.94%
NDP	Travis Thompson	232	24.60%
Green	Conrad Bitangcol	124	13.15%
Alberta Alliance	Michaela Meldrum	30	3.18%
Total		943	100%
Rejected, spoiled and declined		35	

=== 2012 ===
2012 Alberta student vote results
Affiliation	Candidate	Votes	%
Progressive Conservative	Stephen Khan		%
Wildrose	James Burrows		
Liberal			%
Alberta Party	Tim Osborne		
NDP	Nicole Bownes	%	
Total			100%

== See also ==
- List of Alberta provincial electoral districts
- Canadian provincial electoral districts
