= Lac La Biche (provincial electoral district) =

Defunct provincial electoral district in Alberta, Canada

Alberta electoral district

Defunct provincial electoral district
- Legislature: Legislative Assembly of Alberta
- District created: 1952
- District abolished: 1971
- First contested: 1952
- Last contested: 1968

Lac La Biche was a provincial electoral district in Alberta, Canada, mandated to return a single member to the Legislative Assembly of Alberta from 1952 to 1971.

It replaced the riding of Beaver River and received the north-east parts of Athabasca, including the town of McMurray. It was replaced in 1971 by Lac La Biche-McMurray with minor boundary changes.

== Representation history ==
Members of the Legislative Assembly for Lac La Biche
Assembly	Years	Member	Party
See Beaver River 1913-1952 and Athabasca 1905-1952
12th	1952–1955	Harry Lobay	Social Credit
13th	1955–1959	Michael Maccagno	Liberal
14th	1959–1963	Michael Maccagno	Liberal
15th	1963–1967	Michael Maccagno	Liberal
16th	1967–1968	Michael Maccagno	Liberal
16th	1968	Vacant	
16th	1968–1971	Damase Bouvier	Social Credit
See Lac La Biche-McMurray 1971-1986

The district's first MLA was one-term member for the abolished riding of Beaver River, Harry Lobay, who sat with the Social Credit caucus in government. He was defeated in the 1952 election by Liberal Michael Maccagno.

Maccagno defended the riding in three successive elections, and was party leader between 1964 and 1968. He resigned his seat in that year, triggering a by-election which was won by Social Credit candidate Dan Bouvier.

== Election results ==
=== 1950s ===
1952 Alberta general election
Party	Candidate	Votes	%
Social Credit	Harry Lobay	1,832	50.55%
Liberal	William Hamilton	1,792	49.45%
Total valid votes		3,624	
Rejected, spoiled, and declined		184	
Electors / turnout		5,561	68.48%
Social Credit pickup new district.			

1955 Alberta general election
Party	Candidate	Votes	%	±%
Liberal	Michael Maccagno	1,931	50.83%	+1.38%
Social Credit	Harry Lobay	1,868	49.17%	-1.38%
Total valid votes		3,799		
Rejected, spoiled, and declined		98		
Electors / turnout		5,263	74.05%	+5.57%
Liberal gain from Social Credit		Swing		+1.38%

For the 1959 election, rural districts were elected by the first past the post method instead of the previous instant runoff voting. No second round had ever been needed in Lac La Biche, but this change can be seen in the dramatic drop in spoiled (incorrectly marked) ballots.

1959 Alberta general election
Party	Candidate	Votes	%	±%
Liberal	Michael Maccagno	1,734	47.34%	-3.49%
Social Credit	Elwin Woynarowich	1,518	41.44%	-7.73%
Progressive Conservative	Henry Thompson	411	11.22%	
Total valid votes		3,663		
Rejected, spoiled, and declined		15		
Electors / turnout		5,263	69.88%	-4.17%
Liberal hold		Swing		+2.12%

=== 1960s ===
1963 Alberta general election
Party	Candidate	Votes	%	±%
Liberal	Michael Maccagno	1,809	44.22%	-3.12%
Social Credit	Elwin Woynarowich	1,479	36.15%	-5.29%
New Democratic	Henry Tomaschuk	297	7.26%	
Progressive Conservative	Henry Thompson	260	6.36%	-4.86%
Independent Social Credit	Rudolph Michetti	246	60.1%	
Total valid votes		4,091		
Rejected, spoiled, and declined		5		
Electors / turnout		5,235	78.24%	+8.36%
Liberal hold		Swing		+1.09%

1967 Alberta general election
Party	Candidate	Votes	%	±%
Liberal	Michael Maccagno	2,212	48.27%	+4.05%
Social Credit	Harry Lobay	1,613	35.20%	-0.95%
New Democratic	Fred Ustina	758	16.54%	+9.28%
Total valid votes		4,583		
Rejected, spoiled, and declined		130*		
Electors / turnout		7,165	63.96%	-14.28%
Liberal hold		Swing		+2.50%

Alberta provincial by-election, August 20, 1968 Upon the resignation of Michael Maccagno
Party	Candidate	Votes	%	±%
Social Credit	Damase Bouvier	2,765	56.87%	+21.67%
Progressive Conservative	J. Bergeron	1,238	25.46%	–
Liberal	W. C. Childs	653	13.43%	-34.84%
New Democratic	R. Stuart	206	4.24%	-12.30%
Total valid votes		4,862	–	–
Rejected, spoiled, and declined		–	–	–
Electors / turnout		–	–	–
Social Credit gain from Liberal		Swing		-1.90%
Source(s) "By-elections". Elections Alberta.

== Plebiscite results ==
=== 1957 liquor plebiscite ===
1957 Alberta liquor plebiscite results: Lac La Biche
Question A: Do you approve additional types of outlets for the sale of beer, wine and spirituous liquor subject to a local vote?
Ballot choice	Votes	%
Yes	1,059	66.15%
No	542	33.85%
Total votes	1,601	100%
Rejected, spoiled and declined	9	
4,678 eligible electors, turnout 34.42%

On October 30, 1957, a stand-alone plebiscite was held province wide in all 50 of the then current provincial electoral districts in Alberta. The government decided to consult Alberta voters to decide on liquor sales and mixed drinking after a divisive debate in the legislature. The plebiscite was intended to deal with the growing demand for reforming antiquated liquor control laws.

The plebiscite was conducted in two parts. Question A, asked in all districts, asked the voters if the sale of liquor should be expanded in Alberta, while Question B, asked in a handful of districts within the corporate limits of Calgary and Edmonton, asked if men and women should be allowed to drink together in establishments.

Province wide Question A of the plebiscite passed in 33 of the 50 districts while Question B passed in all five districts. Lac La Biche voted in favour of the proposal with a near landslide majority. Voter turnout in the district was poor, and fell significantly below the province wide average of 46%.

Official district returns were released to the public on December 31, 1957. The Social Credit government in power at the time did not consider the results binding. However the results of the vote led the government to repeal all existing liquor legislation and introduce an entirely new Liquor Act.

Municipal districts lying inside electoral districts that voted against the plebiscite were designated Local Option Zones by the Alberta Liquor Control Board and considered effective dry zones. Business owners who wanted a licence had to petition for a binding municipal plebiscite in order to be granted a licence.

== See also ==
- List of Alberta provincial electoral districts
- Canadian provincial electoral districts
