= Charles Earland Anderson =

Canadian politician (born 1942)

Member of the Legislative Assembly of Alberta
- In office 1979–1982
- Preceded by: Mick Fluker
- Succeeded by: John Drobot
- Constituency: St. Paul

Personal details
- Born: February 10, 1942 (age 84) Vulcan, Alberta
- Party: Progressive Conservative

Charles Earland Anderson was a provincial level politician from Alberta, Canada. He served as a member of the Legislative Assembly of Alberta from 1979 to 1982 sitting with the governing Progressive Conservative caucus during his time in office.

== Political career ==
Anderson ran for a seat to the Alberta Legislature in the 1979 Alberta general election. He won the electoral district of St. Paul to hold it for the governing Progressive Conservatives in a tight race over NDP candidate Laurent Dubois and two other candidates. He retired from provincial politics at dissolution of the assembly in 1982.
