= Lionel Tellier =

Canadian politician

Lionel R. Tellier

Member of the Legislative Assembly of Alberta
- In office March 21, 1940 – August 8, 1944
- Preceded by: Charles Holder
- Succeeded by: Charles Holder
- Constituency: St. Albert

Personal details
- Born: December 28, 1905 Morinville, Alberta
- Died: June 17, 1973 (aged 67)
- Party: Independent
- Occupation: politician

Lionel R. Tellier (December 28, 1905 – June 17, 1973) was a provincial politician from Alberta, Canada. He served as a member of the Legislative Assembly of Alberta from 1940 to 1944 sitting as an Independent.

== Political career ==
Tellier ran for a seat to the Alberta Legislature in the 1940 Alberta general election as an Independent candidate. He defeated incumbent Social Credit MLA Charles Holder on the fourth vote count. The vote had Tellier running second on the first ballot but he came out ahead when the other preferences were counted.

Tellier did not run for a second term and retired at dissolution of the Assembly in 1944.
