= John Drobot =

Canadian politician

John Drobot (July 3, 1926 – January 17, 1998) is a former provincial level politician from Alberta, Canada. He served as a member of the Legislative Assembly of Alberta from 1982 to 1993.

== Political career ==
Drobot ran as a Progressive Conservative candidate for the 1982 Alberta general election. He won the electoral district of St. Paul with a large plurality to hold the district for the Progressive Conservatives. He was reelected in the 1986 Alberta general election. He won that race with a significantly reduced plurality, as second place was closely contested by the Representative Party and the NDP. Drobot ran for his third and final term in office in the 1989 Alberta general election. He defeated Liberal candidate and future MLA Paul Langevin. He retired at dissolution of the Assembly in 1993.

Drobot died on January 17, 1998.

Legislative Assembly of Alberta
Preceded by Charles Earland Anderson	MLA St. Paul; 1982-1993	Succeeded by District Abolished
