= Mick Fluker =

Canadian politician

Allison Mick" Ira Fluker

Member of the Legislative Assembly of Alberta
- In office August 30, 1971 – March 14, 1979
- Preceded by: Raymond Reierson
- Succeeded by: Charles Anderson
- Constituency: St. Paul

Personal details
- Born: January 6, 1926 Lamont, Alberta, Canada
- Died: October 16, 1990 (aged 64) Edmonton, Alberta, Canada
- Party: Progressive Conservative

Allison Ira "Mick" Fluker (January 6, 1926 – October 16, 1990) was a politician from Alberta, Canada. He served in the Legislative Assembly of Alberta from 1971 to 1979 as a member of the governing Progressive Conservative caucus.

== Political career ==
Fluker first ran for a seat to the Alberta Legislature in the 1971 general election. He defeated Social Credit incumbent Raymond Reierson and two other candidates to pick up the St. Paul electoral district for his party.

Fluker ran for a second term in the 1975 Alberta general election and defeated three other candidates to hold his seat. Fluker retired from the Assembly at dissolution in 1979.
