= Franco-Albertan flag =

Flag of francophones in Alberta, Canada

- Adopted: 6 March 1982 (Note: The following date was when the flag was created. The flag was later adopted as a "Symbol of Distinction" by the government of Alberta in June 2017. The flag was registered with the Canadian Heraldic Authority on 15 August 2018.)
- Designed by: Jean-Pierre Grenier

The Franco-Albertan flag is a symbol used to represent Franco-Albertans. The flag features several colours and elements relating to the province of Alberta as well as the Francophonie. The colour white and a white fleur-de-lys is used to represent French culture, whereas the red-coloured wild rose and the colour blue is used to represent the province of Alberta.

== Design ==
The flag is charged with a white fleur-de-lys, with the symbol and the colour white used to represent the Francophonie and French culture. The provincial flower of Alberta, a red-coloured wild rose, and the colour blue is used to represent the province of Alberta. The flag also features two diagonal bands that represent the waterways used by French Canadian pioneers who explored and settled the province.

== History ==
The flag was created by Jean-Pierre Grenier, who submitted the design for a competition held by Francophonie jeunesse de l’Alberta. The flag was first unveiled at the Congrès Annuel de l’Association Canadienne-Francaise de l’Alberta on 6 March 1982.

The Association canadienne-française de l'Alberta has organized Franco-Albertan flag-raising ceremonies on the first Friday of March since 2009.

In June 2017, the flag was formally adopted as a "Symbol of Distinction" and an emblem for Franco-Albertans by the government of Alberta as a part of the province's first French-language policy. The flag was registered with the Canadian Heraldic Authority on 15 August 2018.

The government of Alberta raised the Franco-Albertan flag for one month in March 2018, in commemoration of Francophone month in Alberta. However, the government of Alberta later adopted a resolution in August 2019, limiting the time a flag representing specific groups could fly at the legislature. After the resolution, the Franco-Albertan flag was only flown outside the Alberta Legislature Building for one day each year.

== See also ==
- List of Franco-Canadian flags
- Symbols of Alberta
