= Charles Holder =

Canadian politician

Charles Garrett Holder
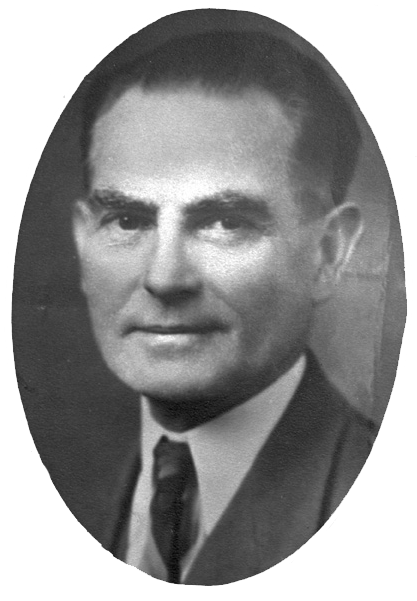

Member of the Legislative Assembly of Alberta
- In office August 22, 1935 – March 21, 1940
- Preceded by: Omer St. Germain
- Succeeded by: Lionel Tellier
- Constituency: St. Albert
- In office August 8, 1944 – August 17, 1948
- Preceded by: Lionel Tellier
- Succeeded by: Lucien Maynard

Personal details
- Born: August 14, 1874 Battersea, Ontario
- Died: February 19, 1962 (aged 87) Busby, Alberta
- Party: Social Credit
- Occupation: politician

Charles Garrett Holder (1874-1962) was a politician from Alberta, Canada. He served in the Legislative Assembly of Alberta from 1935 to 1940 and from 1944 to 1948 as a member of the Social Credit caucus.

== Political career ==
Holder ran for a seat to the Alberta Legislature for the first time in the 1935 general election, as a Social Credit candidate in the electoral district of St. Albert. He defeated incumbent Omer St. Germain to pick up the seat for his party.

Holder ran for a second term in the 1940 general election. He was defeated by independent candidate Lionel Tellier on the fourth count.

Holder was nominated to run for Social Credit again at a convention held in Morinville on February 9, 1944. He ran in the general election held that year and won on the second vote count. He retired from the assembly at dissolution in 1948.
