= Pakan (electoral district) =

Defunct provincial electoral district in Alberta, Canada

Coordinates: 54.1°N 111.9°W

Alberta electoral district

Defunct provincial electoral district
- Legislature: Legislative Assembly of Alberta
- District created: 1909
- District abolished: 1913
- First contested: 1909
- Last contested: 1909

Pakan was a provincial electoral district in Alberta, Canada, mandated to return a single member to the Legislative Assembly of Alberta using first-past-the-post balloting from 1909 to 1913.

== History ==
The riding was created in 1909 when Victoria shifted its boundaries west into Sturgeon. The riding was named after the small community of Pakan, Alberta, which is currently known as Fort Victoria. Today, the site of the community is a historical museum known as Victoria Settlement.

The riding existed in the central north east part of the province, along the Alberta-Saskatchewan border. It disappeared in 1913 when it was split into Beaver River and St. Paul.

=== Representation history ===
Members of the Legislative Assembly for Pakan
| Assembly | Years | Member | Party |
|---|---|---|---|
See Victoria 1905-1909
| 2nd | 1909–1913 | Prosper-Edmond Lessard | Liberal |
See St. Paul 1913-1993 and Beaver River 1913-1952

The district's only MLA was Prosper-Edmond Lessard, who was acclaimed in 1909 and served until the riding was abolished at the end of the term. He would go on to serve in the new riding of St. Paul.

No election actually ever took place in this district, as there were no other candidates declared in the 1909 election.

== Election results ==
1909 Alberta general election
| Party | Candidate | Votes |
|---|---|---|
| Liberal | Prosper-Edmond Lessard | Acclaimed |
| Total valid votes | | 0 |
| Liberal pickup new district. | | |

== See also ==
- List of Alberta provincial electoral districts
- Canadian provincial electoral districts
- Fort Victoria, Alberta
