= Joseph Beaudry =

Canadian politician (1885–1954)

Joseph Beaudry QC
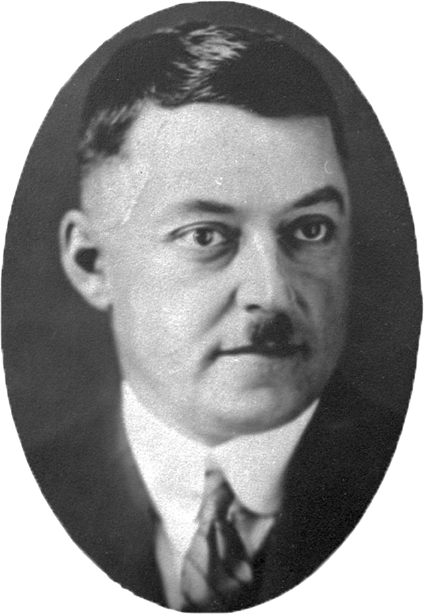

Member of the Legislative Assembly of Alberta
- In office August 22, 1935 – August 4, 1952
- Preceded by: Joseph Miville Dechene
- Succeeded by: Raymond Reierson
- Constituency: St. Paul

Personal details
- Born: March 27, 1885 Sainte-Mélanie, Quebec
- Died: March 22, 1954 (aged 69) St. Paul, Alberta
- Party: Social Credit
- Education: Laval University

Joseph William Beaudry QC (March 27, 1885 – March 22, 1954) was a provincial politician from Alberta, Canada. He served as a member of the Legislative Assembly of Alberta from 1935 to 1952, sitting with the Social Credit caucus in government.

== Early life ==
Beaudry was born in Sainte-Mélanie, Quebec on March 27, 1885, to Narcisse Beaudry and Leda Hetu, both French-Canadian. He attended Joliette Seminary and Laval University earning a Bachelor of Science and LLB.

== Political life ==
Beaudry served as the secretary of Village St. Paul from 1924 to 1930, then Mayor of St. Paul from 1930 to 1935.

Beaudry was elected to the Legislative Assembly of Alberta in 1935 for the governing Social Credit Party in St. Paul. He defeated the Liberal incumbent Joseph Miville Dechene and former United Farmers of Alberta MLA Laudas Joly. Beaudry was re-elected in the 1940, 1944, and 1948 elections.
