= Joseph Miville Dechene =

Canadian politician (1879-1962)

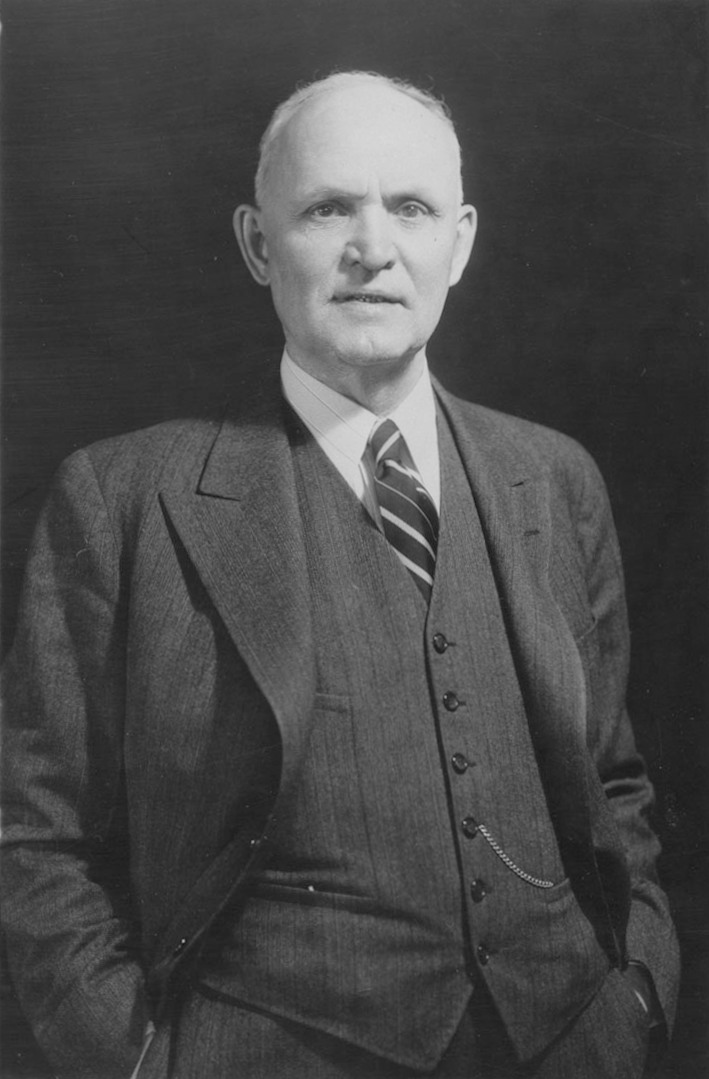
- Joseph Miville Dechene as an MP

Member of the Legislative Assembly of Alberta
- In office July 18, 1921 – June 28, 1926
- Preceded by: Wilfrid Gariépy
- Succeeded by: John Delisle
- Constituency: Beaver River
- In office June 19, 1930 – August 22, 1935
- Preceded by: Laudas Joly
- Succeeded by: Joseph Beaudry
- Constituency: St. Paul

Member of the Canadian House of Commons
- In office March 26, 1940 – February 1, 1958
- Preceded by: Percy Rowe
- Succeeded by: Jack Bigg
- Constituency: Athabaska

Personal details
- Born: October 22, 1879 Chambord, Quebec
- Died: December 1, 1962 (aged 83)
- Party: Alberta Liberal federal Liberal
- Occupation: farmer and politician

Joseph Miville Dechene (October 22, 1879 – December 1, 1962) was a Canadian farmer and politician who served at all three levels of government. He served as a councillor of the town of Bonnyville from 1928 to 1934, as a Liberal MLA in the Legislative Assembly of Alberta from 1921 to 1926 and again from 1930 to 1935, and as a Liberal MP in the House of Commons of Canada from 1940 to 1958.

== Early life ==
Dechene was born on October 22, 1879, in Chambord, Quebec.

== Provincial politics ==
Dechene ran for a seat to the Alberta Legislature in the 1921 Alberta general election. He won the Beaver River electoral district by a comfortable margin to hold it for the Liberals.

In the 1926 general election he was defeated by United Farmers candidate John Delisle.

Dechene made a comeback in the 1930 general election. He ran in the electoral district of St. Paul and defeated incumbent Laudas Joly by just 18 votes.

Dechene faced Joly again in the 1935 general election. Both were defeated by Social Credit candidate Joseph Beaudry. Beaudry, although leading in the first count of votes, did not have majority (as required for election under Alternative Voting) so Joly was eliminated and his votes transferred based on back-up preferences marked on the ballots. Beaudry then won on the Second Count.

== Local government involvement ==
He served as a member of council in the small town of Bonnyville, Alberta from 1928 to 1934.

== Federal politics ==
He served as a Liberal Member of Parliament from 1940 to 1958.

Dechene ran for the House of Commons of Canada in the 1940 federal election as a Liberal candidate in the electoral district of Athabaska. He faced two incumbents: William Hayhurst, who had moved from Vegreville after failing to retain the Social Credit nomination there, and Percy John Rowe, who had defected from Social Credit and joined the Cooperative Commonwealth Federation. Dechene won the election by 1,100 votes over Hayhurst while Rowe finished a distant third place.

In the 1945 federal election Dechene hung onto his seat with 35% of the popular vote in a five-way race.

In the 1949 federal election Dechene faced four other candidates, including former Member of Parliament Orvis Kennedy. He won with 45% of the popular vote.

In the 1953 federal election Dechene won a four-way race with almost 50% of the popular vote, the largest of his career in federal politics.

In the 1957 federal election. Dechene attained a narrow victory over Social Credit candidate Archie McPhail. He retired from Parliament at dissolution a year later.
