= Henry H. Dakin =

Canadian politician

Member of the Legislative Assembly of Alberta
- In office August 21, 1930 – August 22, 1935
- Preceded by: John Delisle
- Succeeded by: Lucien Maynard
- Constituency: Beaver River

Personal details
- Born: 28 March 1870 Trout Cove, Digby, Nova Scotia, Canada
- Died: 1 April 1956 (aged 86) Dakin/Atmore, Alberta, Canada
- Party: Liberal
- Occupation: politician

Henry H. Dakin (28 March 1870 – 1 April 1956) was a provincial politician in Alberta, Canada. He served as a member of the Legislative Assembly of Alberta from 1930 to 1935 sitting with the Liberal caucus in opposition.

== Before politics ==
Henry Hanford Dakin was born near Digby, Nova Scotia and became a seaman. He was called Captain Dakin and described as a Master Mariner. He is said to have been injured in the Halifax Explosion in 1917 and subsequently moved to Alberta. There he was postmaster in the small locality of Dakin (possibly named after him) from 1925–1930, resigning on the day after he was nominated as a political candidate. Angeline Dakin took over the postmastership but was dismissed in January 1932 for political partisanship; she resumed the post in 1936, after Henry left the Legislative Assembly, and served until 1948.

== Political career ==
Dakin ran for the nomination of the provincial Liberals to run as the liberal candidate in the 1930 Alberta general election. He was acclaimed at a nomination meeting on May 26, 1930 held in Spedden, Alberta.

The general election was hotly contested, on election night Dakin finished seven votes behind incumbent John Delisle. The 87 votes attained by Independent candidate Luc Lebel forced the race to a second count. The second count showed that Delisle had beaten Dakin by 21 votes when the second preferences from Lebel were transferred.

The Liberals challenged the election and took the matter to court. On August 21, 1930 Judge Taylor overturned the results, declaring Dakin elected by four votes over Delisle.

Dakin and Delisle faced each other for the second time in the 1935 Alberta general election. They were both defeated losing to Social Credit candidate Lucien Maynard finishing second and third in the four way race.
