= Harry Lobay =

Canadian politician

Harry Lobay (June 23, 1917 – June 17, 1991) was a politician from Alberta, Canada.

Harry was elected to the Legislative Assembly of Alberta in the 1948 Alberta general election for the riding of Beaver River on a comfortable margin after ballot transfer. He represented the Alberta Social Credit Party, and served as a backbencher under the Ernest Manning government.

Harry was re-elected in the 1952 Alberta general election in a hotly contested battle in the new district of Lac La Biche. He defeated Alberta Liberal Party candidate William Hamilton by 40 votes.

In the 1959 Alberta general election, Harry ran attempting to get a third term in office, he was defeated by future Liberal party leader Michael Maccagno.

Harry again ran as the candidate in Lac La Biche in the 1967 Alberta general election, but was once again defeated by Maccagno.

Preceded by Lucien Maynard	MLA Beaver River; 1948–1952	Succeeded by District Abolished
Preceded by New District	MLA Lac La Biche; 1952–1955	Succeeded by Michael Maccagno
