= Laudas Joly =

Canadian politician (1887-1960)

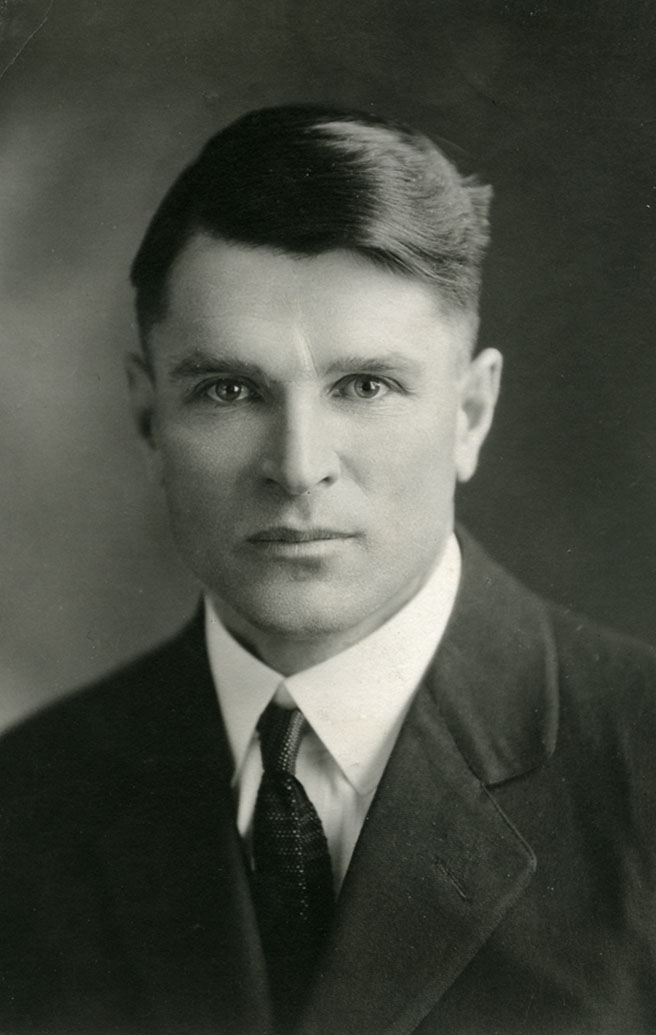

Member of the Legislative Assembly of Alberta
- In office July 18, 1921 – June 19, 1930
- Preceded by: Prosper-Edmond Lessard
- Succeeded by: Joseph Dechene
- Constituency: St. Paul
- In office August 5, 1952 – June 29, 1955
- Preceded by: New District
- Succeeded by: Jake Josvanger
- Constituency: Bonnyville

Personal details
- Born: August 6, 1887 St. Thomas D'Alfred, Ontario
- Died: April 30, 1960 (aged 72) Bonnyville, Alberta
- Party: Social Credit
- Other political affiliations: United Farmers
- Occupation: politician

Laudas Joly (August 6, 1887 – April 30, 1960) was a politician from Alberta, Canada. He served in the Legislative Assembly of Alberta from 1921 to 1930 as a member of the United Farmers of Alberta and from 1952 to 1955 as a member of the Social Credit Party.

== Personal ==
Joly was born in 1887 to parents Anselme Phydime Joly and Corinne Therien in Ontario and moved to Alberta.

== Political career ==
Joly first ran for a seat to the Alberta Legislature as a United Farmers candidate in the 1921 general election. He defeated incumbent Prosper-Edmond Lessard in the electoral district of St. Paul to pick up the seat for his party. He was re-elected in the 1926 general election.

Joly was defeated in the 1930 general election by Liberal candidate Joseph Dechene by just 18 votes . He ran again in the 1935 general election and was defeated by Social Credit candidate Joseph Beaudry.

Joly ran once again in the new electoral district of Bonnyville in the 1952 general election, this time as a Social Credit candidate. He won the two-way race in a landslide. He retired from the assembly at dissolution in 1955.

== Electoral results ==
1921 Alberta general election: St. Paul
Party	Candidate	Votes	%	±%
United Farmers	Laudas Joly	1,378	58.34%	
Liberal	Prosper-Edmond Lessard	984	41.66%	-24.99%
Total valid votes		2,362		
United Farmers gain from Liberal		Swing		+41.67%

1926 Alberta general election: St. Paul
Party	Candidate	Votes	%	±%
United Farmers	Laudas Joly	1,453	67.24%	+8.90%
Liberal	H. Montambeault	603	27.90%	-13.76%
Independent	E. McPheeters	105	4.86%	
Total valid votes		2,161		
Rejected, spoiled and declined		151		
Electors / Turnout		3,252	71.09%	
United Farmers hold		Swing		+11.33%

1930 Alberta general election: St. Paul
Party	Candidate	Votes	%	±%
Liberal	Joseph Miville Dechene	1,653	50.27%	+22.37%
United Farmers	Laudas Joly	1,635	49.73%	-17.51%
Total valid votes		3,288		
Rejected, spoiled and declined		149		
Electors / Turnout		4,776	71.96%	+0.87%
Liberal gain from United Farmers		Swing		+19.94%

1935 Alberta general election: St. Paul
Party	Candidate	Votes	%	±%
Social Credit	Joseph Beaudry	2,567	46.88%	
Liberal	Joseph Miville Dechene	1,963	35.85%	-14.42%
United Farmers	Laudas Joly	946	17.27%	-32.46%
Second round
Social Credit	Joseph Beaudry	2,679	53.12%	+6.24%
Liberal	Joseph Miville Dechene	2,364	46.88%	+11.03%
No second preference		433		
Total valid votes		5,476		
Rejected, spoiled and declined		180		
Electors / Turnout		6,876	82.26%	+10.30%
Social Credit gain from Liberal		Swing		+30.65%

Second-round swing reflects increase in vote share from the first round. Overall swing is calculated from first preferences.

1952 Alberta general election: Bonnyville
Party	Candidate	Votes	%
Social Credit	Laudas Joly	2,497	65.94%
Liberal	Irvin J. Baril	1,290	34.06%
Total valid votes		3,787	
Rejected, spoiled and declined		215	
Eligible electors / Turnout		5,935	67.43%
Social Credit pickup new district.			
