= Lucien Maynard =

Canadian lawyer and politician

Joseph Lucien Paul Maynard
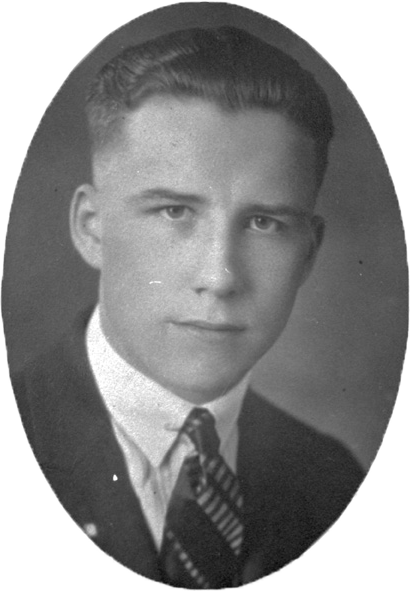

Member of the Legislative Assembly of Alberta
- In office August 22, 1935 – August 17, 1948
- Preceded by: Henry Dakin
- Succeeded by: Harry Lobay
- Constituency: Beaver River
- In office August 17, 1948 – June 29, 1955
- Preceded by: Charles Holder
- Succeeded by: Arthur Soetaert
- Constituency: St. Albert

Minister without Portfolio
- In office May 12, 1936 – January 20, 1937

Minister of Municipal Affairs
- In office January 20, 1937 – June 1, 1943
- Preceded by: Charles Cockroft
- Succeeded by: Clarence Gerhart

Attorney General
- In office June 1, 1943 – August 2, 1955
- Preceded by: John Hugill
- Succeeded by: Ernest Manning

Personal details
- Born: February 17, 1908 Montreal, Quebec, Canada
- Died: February 7, 1996 (aged 87) Edmonton, Alberta
- Party: Social Credit
- Occupation: lawyer, politician

Joseph Lucien Paul Maynard (February 17, 1908 – February 7, 1996) was a lawyer and a provincial politician from Alberta, Canada. He served in the Legislative Assembly of Alberta from 1935 to 1955 as a member of the Social Credit Party.

Maynard served as a cabinet minister under Premiers William Aberhart and Ernest Manning in various portfolios from 1936 to 1955.

== Political career ==
Maynard first ran for a seat in the Alberta Legislature in the 1935 general election. He contested the Beaver River electoral district under the Social Credit banner and defeated three other candidates, including incumbent Henry Dakin and former MLA John Delisle. Premier William Aberhart appointed him to the Executive Council of Alberta as a Minister without portfolio on May 12, 1936. Less than a year later, on January 20, 1937, Aberhart promoted Maynard to Minister of Municipal Affairs.

On June 1, 1943, Ernest Manning, who had recently succeeded Aberhart as premier, promoted Maynard to Attorney General. He remained in that portfolio until his defeat in his home riding of St. Albert in the 1955 general election at the hands of Liberal candidate Arthur Soetaert. Maynard's defeat left the Social Credit government without any lawyers in caucus; Premier Ernest Manning then took the post of Attorney General himself.

In 1962 Maynard attempted a return to politics by running in the electoral district of Edmonton East for the federal Social Credit party in that year's federal election. He finished a distant second to Progressive Conservative incumbent William Skoreyko. Maynard ran against Skoreyko again in the 1963 election, but fared even more poorly, finishing a distant third.

Many years later, in 1985, Maynard ran as an independent in a provincial by-election in the Edmonton-Whitemud electoral district. He finished in fifth place out of six candidates, losing to Premier Don Getty.

He made one last bid for office in the 1988 federal election as a candidate of the Confederation of Regions Party in Edmonton Northwest. He finished sixth out of seven candidates, losing to incumbent Murray Dorin.
