= Beaver River (provincial electoral district) =

Defunct provincial electoral district in Alberta, Canada

Alberta electoral district

Defunct provincial electoral district
- Legislature: Legislative Assembly of Alberta
- District created: 1913
- District abolished: 1952
- First contested: 1913
- Last contested: 1948

Beaver River was a provincial electoral district in Alberta, Canada, mandated to return a single member to the Legislative Assembly of Alberta from 1913 to 1952. It was created in 1913 from the western half of Pakan, and abolished in 1952 when it and the northern parts of Athabasca were replaced by Lac La Biche.

From 1924 to 1952, the district used instant-runoff voting to elect its MLA.

== Representation history ==
Members of the Legislative Assembly for Beaver River
Assembly	Years	Member	Party
See Pakan 1909-1913
3rd	1913–1917	Wilfrid Gariépy	Liberal
4th	1917–1921	Wilfrid Gariépy	Liberal
5th	1921–1926	Joseph Dechêne	Liberal
6th	1926–1930	John Delisle	United Farmers
7th	1930–1935	Henry Dakin	Liberal
8th	1935–1940	Lucien Maynard	Social Credit
9th	1940–1944	Lucien Maynard	Social Credit
10th	1944–1948	Lucien Maynard	Social Credit
11th	1948–1952	Harry Lobay	Social Credit
See Lac La Biche 1952-1971

Beaver River's first MLA was Liberal Wilfrid Gariépy, a Quebec-born settler whose residency would be the subject of controversy toward the end of his second term. He did not run for a third, choosing instead to return to Trois-Rivières. Liberal Joseph Dechêne won the riding in 1921, but would go on to defeat in 1926. He later became MLA for neighbouring St. Paul.

John Delisle picked Beaver River up for the United Farmers of Alberta, serving only one term. In the 1930 election, a judicial recount declared him narrowly defeated by Liberal Henry Dakin, who would also serve only one term.

In the 1935 Social Credit sweep, Lucien Maynard won Beaver River by a landslide. He easily won re-election twice more, retiring for the 1948 election.

Social Credit kept the riding, with Harry Lobay narrowly beating his Liberal challenger and serving out the riding's last term. It was replaced in 1952, but Lobay would go on to serve another term as MLA for the new riding of Lac La Biche.

== Election results ==
=== 1910s ===
1913 Alberta general election
Party	Candidate	Votes	%
Liberal	Wilfrid Gariépy	457	61.67%
Conservative	Ambrose Gray	284	38.33%
Total		741	
Liberal pickup new district.			
Source(s) Source: "Beaver River Official Results 1913 Alberta general election". Alberta Heritage Community Foundation.

Alberta provincial by-election, December 15, 1913 Ministerial by-election upon appointment as Minister of Municipal Affairs
Party	Candidate	Votes	%	±%
Liberal	Wilfrid Gariépy	Acclaimed	–	–
Total		N/A	–	–
Rejected, spoiled and declined		N/A	–	–
Eligible electors / turnout		N/A	N/A	–
Liberal hold		Swing		–
Source(s) "By-elections". Elections Alberta.

1917 Alberta general election
Party	Candidate	Votes	%	±%
Liberal	Wilfrid Gariépy	1,134	64.07%	2.39%
Conservative	Ambrose Gray	636	35.93%	-2.39%
Total		1,770	–	–
Rejected, spoiled and declined		N/A	–	–
Eligible electors / turnout		2,689	65.82%	–
Liberal hold		Swing		2.39%
Source(s) Source: "Beaver River Official Results 1917 Alberta general election". Alberta Heritage Community Foundation.

=== 1920s ===
1921 Alberta general election
Party	Candidate	Votes	%	±%
Liberal	Joseph Miville Dechêne	1,560	62.33%	-1.74%
United Farmers	H. Montambault	943	37.67%	–
Total		2,503	–	–
Rejected, spoiled and declined		N/A	–	–
Eligible electors / turnout		3,510	71.31%	–
Liberal hold		Swing		-1.74%
Source(s) Source: "Beaver River Official Results 1921 Alberta general election". Alberta Heritage Community Foundation.

1926 Alberta general election
Party	Candidate	Votes	%	±%
United Farmers	John Delisle	1,168	54.15%	16.47%
Liberal	Joseph Miville Dechêne	989	45.85%	-16.47%
Total		2,157	–	–
Rejected, spoiled and declined		N/A	–	–
Eligible electors / turnout		3,370	64.01%	–
United Farmers gain from Liberal		Swing		-8.18%
Source(s) Source: "Beaver River Official Results 1926 Alberta general election". Alberta Heritage Community Foundation.

=== 1930s ===
1930 Alberta general election
Party	Candidate	Votes	%	±%
United Farmers	John Delisle	1,028	48.13%	-6.02%
Liberal	Henry H. Dakin	1,021	47.80%	1.95%
Independent	Luc Lebel	87	4.07%	–
Total		2,136	–	–
Rejected, spoiled and declined		119	–	–
Eligible electors / turnout		3,431	65.72%	–
Liberal gain		Swing		21.95%
Source(s) Source: "Beaver River Official Results 1930 Alberta general election". Alberta Heritage Community Foundation. Totals and swing for 1930 are based on the initial count; a judicial recount sided in favour of Dakin.

1935 Alberta general election
Party	Candidate	Votes	%	±%
Social Credit	Lucien Maynard	1,751	53.96%	–
Liberal	Henry H. Dakin	775	23.88%	-21.97%
United Farmers	John Delisle	572	17.63%	-36.52%
Conservative	Walter Allen	147	4.53%	–
Total		3,245	–	–
Rejected, spoiled and declined		N/A	–	–
Eligible electors / turnout		4,857	66.81%	–
Social Credit gain from		Swing		-11.06%
Source(s) Source: "Beaver River Official Results 1935 Alberta general election". Alberta Heritage Community Foundation.

=== 1940s ===
1940 Alberta general election
Party	Candidate	Votes	%	±%
Social Credit	Lucien Maynard	2,555	57.06%	–
Independent Liberal	A. Crowther	1,136	25.37%	–
Co-operative Commonwealth	John Hannochko	669	14.94%	–
Independent Farmer	J. Bibby	118	2.64%	–
Total		4,478	–	–
Rejected, spoiled and declined		201	–	–
Eligible electors / turnout		6,646	70.40%	–
Social Credit hold		Swing		0.81%
Source(s) Source: "Beaver River Official Results 1940 Alberta general election". Alberta Heritage Community Foundation.

1944 Alberta general election
Party	Candidate	Votes	%	±%
Social Credit	Lucien Maynard	2,747	60.57%	3.51%
Co-operative Commonwealth	John Hannochko	1,403	30.94%	16.00%
Labor–Progressive	Stanley Dumka	385	8.49%	–
Total		4,535	–	–
Rejected, spoiled and declined		159	–	–
Eligible electors / turnout		6,757	69.47%	–
Social Credit hold		Swing		-1.03%
Source(s) Source: "Beaver River Official Results 1944 Alberta general election". Alberta Heritage Community Foundation.

1948 Alberta general election
Party	Candidate	Votes	%	±%
First count
Social Credit	Harry Lobay	1,992	41.05%	-19.52%
Liberal	Cecil Belleville	1,579	32.54%	–
Co-operative Commonwealth	John Hannochko	1,282	26.42%	-4.52%
Total		4,853	–	–
Ballot transfer results
Social Credit	Harry Lobay	2,117	55.49%	14.44%
Liberal	Cecil Belleville	1,698	44.51%	–
Co-operative Commonwealth	John Hannochko	Eliminated	–	–
Total		3,815	–	–
Rejected, spoiled and declined		265	–	–
Eligible electors / turnout		7,423	68.95%	–
Social Credit hold		Swing		-26.03%
Source(s) Source: "Beaver River Official Results 1948 Alberta general election". Alberta Heritage Community Foundation. Instant-runoff voting requires a candidate to receive a plurality (greater than 50%) of the votes. As no candidate received a plurality of votes, the bottom candidate was eliminated and their 2nd place votes were applied to both other candidates until one received a plurality

Overall swing is based on first count. Second-round swing reflects increase in vote share from the first count.

== See also ==
- List of Alberta provincial electoral districts
- Canadian provincial electoral districts
- Beaver River, a river in east-central Alberta and central Saskatchewan
- Beaver River, Alberta, a community in central Alberta
