= St. Paul (provincial electoral district) =

Defunct provincial electoral district in Alberta, Canada

Coordinates: 54.00°N 111.29°W

Alberta electoral district

Defunct provincial electoral district
- Legislature: Legislative Assembly of Alberta
- District created: 1913
- District abolished: 1993
- First contested: 1913
- Last contested: 1989

St. Paul was a provincial electoral district in Alberta, Canada, mandated to return a single member to the Legislative Assembly of Alberta from 1913 to 1993.

== Boundary history ==
When created in 1913, the riding contained all the farmland north of the North Saskatchewan River and east of Lac La Biche, corresponding approximately to the current Bonnyville-Cold Lake-St. Paul riding. In 1952 the riding was split in half, creating the riding of Bonnyville and leaving St. Paul with approximately the same boundaries as the County of St. Paul No. 19 until abolished in 1993.

== Representation history ==
Members of the Legislative Assembly for St. Paul
Assembly	Years	Member	Party
See Pakan 1909–1913
3rd	1913–1917	Prosper-Edmond; Lessard	Liberal
4th	1917–1921	Prosper-Edmond; Lessard	Liberal
5th	1921–1926	Laudas Joly	United Farmers
6th	1926–1930	Laudas Joly	United Farmers
7th	1930–1935	Joseph Dechene	Liberal
8th	1935–1940	Joseph Beaudry	Social Credit
9th	1940–1944	Joseph Beaudry	Social Credit
10th	1944–1948	Joseph Beaudry	Social Credit
11th	1948–1952	Joseph Beaudry	Social Credit
12th	1952–1955	Raymond Reierson	Social Credit
13th	1955–1959	Raymond Reierson	Social Credit
14th	1959–1963	Raymond Reierson	Social Credit
15th	1963–1967	Raymond Reierson	Social Credit
16th	1967–1971	Raymond Reierson	Social Credit
17th	1971–1975	Mick Fluker	Progressive; Conservative
18th	1975–1979	Mick Fluker	Progressive; Conservative
19th	1979–1982	Charles Anderson	Progressive; Conservative
20th	1982–1986	John Drobot	Progressive; Conservative
21st	1986–1989	John Drobot	Progressive; Conservative
22nd	1989–1993	John Drobot	Progressive; Conservative
See Lac La Biche-St. Paul 1993–2012

The first MLA for St. Paul was Prosper-Edmond Lessard, who had already served one term as MLA for the short-lived Pakan district with the government Liberals. In 1921, with the fall of the Liberal government, he was defeated by Laudas Joly of the United Farmers of Alberta.

After two terms, Joly was defeated by Liberal Joseph Miville Dechene. He served one term as MLA before the Social Credit sweep in 1935. The party would hold St. Paul for all 36 years they formed government, with Joseph Beaudry serving for four terms and Raymond Reierson serving for five.

In 1971, the Progressive Conservatives came to power, and Mick Fluker captured St. Paul for the new government. He retired after two terms. Charles Anderson kept the riding for the PC's in the 1979 election, and retired after only one term.

PC John Drobot served as MLA for the next three terms until the riding was abolished in 1993. He did not run in the new riding of Lac La Biche-St. Paul, which was captured by the Liberals.

== Election results ==
=== 1910s ===
1913 Alberta general election
Party	Candidate	Votes	%
Liberal	Prosper-Edmond Lessard	441	55.75%
Conservative	L. Garneau	350	44.25%
Total valid votes		791	
Electors / Turnout		942	83.97%
Liberal pickup new district.			

1917 Alberta general election
Party	Candidate	Votes	%	±%
Liberal	Prosper-Edmond Lessard	1,077	66.65%	+10.9%
Conservative	James Brady	539	33.35%	-10.9%
Total valid votes		1,616		
Electors / Turnout		1,946	83.04%	-0.93%
Liberal hold		Swing		+10.9%

=== 1920s ===
1921 Alberta general election
Party	Candidate	Votes	%	±%
United Farmers	Laudas Joly	1,378	58.34%	
Liberal	Prosper-Edmond Lessard	984	41.66%	-24.99%
Total valid votes		2,362		
United Farmers gain from Liberal		Swing		+41.67%

In 1926, Alberta began to use the instant-runoff system to elect MLAs in rural districts.

1926 Alberta general election
Party	Candidate	Votes	%	±%
United Farmers	Laudas Joly	1,453	67.24%	+8.90%
Liberal	H. Montambeault	603	27.90%	-13.76%
Independent	E. McPheeters	105	4.86%	
Total valid votes		2,161		
Rejected, spoiled and declined		151		
Electors / Turnout		3,252	71.09%	
United Farmers hold		Swing		+11.33%

=== 1930s ===
1930 Alberta general election
Party	Candidate	Votes	%	±%
Liberal	Joseph Miville Dechene	1,653	50.27%	+22.37%
United Farmers	Laudas Joly	1,635	49.73%	-17.51%
Total valid votes		3,288		
Rejected, spoiled and declined		149		
Electors / Turnout		4,776	71.96%	+0.87%
Liberal gain from United Farmers		Swing		+19.94%

1935 Alberta general election
Party	Candidate	Votes	%	±%
Social Credit	Joseph Beaudry	2,567	46.88%	
Liberal	Joseph Miville Dechene	1,963	35.85%	-14.42%
United Farmers	Laudas Joly	946	17.27%	-32.46%
Second round
Social Credit	Joseph Beaudry	2,679	53.12%	+6.24%
Liberal	Joseph Miville Dechene	2,364	46.88%	+11.03%
Neither		433		
Total valid votes		5,476		
Rejected, spoiled and declined		180		
Electors / Turnout		6,876	82.26%	+10.30%
Social Credit gain from Liberal		Swing		+30.65%

Second-round swing reflects increase in vote share from the first round. Overall swing is calculated from first preferences.

=== 1940s ===
1940 Alberta general election
Party	Candidate	Votes	%	±%
Social Credit	Joseph Beaudry	2,270	48.38%	+1.50%
Independent	J. Binette	1,609	34.29%	-1.56%
Co-operative Commonwealth	C. Milaney	813	17.33%	
Second round
Social Credit	Joseph Beaudry	2,421	57.56%	+9.18%
Independent	J. Binette	1,785	42.44%	+8.15%
Neither		486		
Total valid votes		4,692		
Rejected, spoiled and declined		241		
Electors / Turnout		7,023	70.24%	-12.02%
Social Credit hold		Swing		+1.53%

First-round swing is calculated from first preferences in the 1935 election. The independent vote share is compared to the Liberal share in 1935. See Unity Coalition.

1944 Alberta general election
Party	Candidate	Votes	%	±%
Social Credit	Joseph Beaudry	1,851	44.87%	-3.51%
Co-operative Commonwealth	J. Beauregard	1,503	36.43%	+19.10%
Labour Progressive	Daniel Gamache	771	18.69%	
Second round
Social Credit	Joseph Beaudry	1,949	55.10%	+10.23%
Co-operative Commonwealth	J. Beauregard	1,588	44.90%	+8.47
Neither		588		
Total valid votes		4,125		
Rejected, spoiled and declined		254		
Electors / Turnout		6,875	63.69%	-6.55%
Social Credit hold		Swing		-11.31%

1948 Alberta general election
Party	Candidate	Votes	%	±%
Social Credit	Joseph Beaudry	2,197	42.89%	-1.98%
Co-operative Commonwealth	Michael Grekul	1,510	29.47%	-6.96%
Liberal	Irvin Baril	1,416	27.64%	
Second round
Social Credit	Joseph Beaudry	2,980	65.29%	+22.40%
Co-operative Commonwealth	Michael Grekul	1,584	34.71%	+5.07%
Neither		559		
Total valid votes		5,123		
Rejected, spoiled and declined		454		
Electors / Turnout		7,607	73.31%	+9.62%
Social Credit hold		Swing		+2.49%

=== 1950s ===
St. Paul was split for the 1952 election, with the northeastern half of the riding becoming the district of Bonnyville. Former St. Paul MLA Laudas Joly became its first representative.

1952 Alberta general election
Party	Candidate	Votes	%	±%
Social Credit	Raymond Reierson	2,581	53.59%	+10.70%
Liberal	Laval J. Fortier	2,235	46.41%	+18.77%
Total valid votes		4,816		
Rejected, spoiled and declined		214		
Electors / Turnout		7,071	71.14%	-2.17%
Social Credit hold		Swing		-4.04%

1955 Alberta general election
Party	Candidate	Votes	%	±%
Social Credit	Raymond Reierson	2,761	52.84%	-0.75%
Liberal	J.R. Sweeney	2,049	39.22%	-7.19%
Labour Progressive	Don Gamache	415	7.94%	
Total valid votes		5,225		
Rejected, spoiled and declined		288		
Electors / Turnout		7,218	76.37%	+5.23%
Social Credit hold		Swing		+3.22%

Alberta reverted to traditional first past the post elections beginning in 1959. This can be seen in the dramatic drop in spoiled (incorrectly marked) ballots compared to previous elections.

1959 Alberta general election
Party	Candidate	Votes	%	±%
Social Credit	Raymond Reierson	3,412	68.51%	15.67%
Liberal	J. Van Brabant	1,034	20.76%	-18.46%
Progressive Conservative	Gordon Shave	534	10.72%	
Total valid votes		4,980		
Rejected, spoiled and declined		10		
Electors / Turnout		6,682	74.68%	-1.69%
Social Credit hold		Swing		+17.07%

=== 1960s ===
1963 Alberta general election
Party	Candidate	Votes	%	±%
Social Credit	Raymond Reierson	2,889	61.05%	-7.46%
Liberal	Rene P. Foisy	1,363	28.80%	+8.04%
New Democratic	H.B. Hodgins	265	5.60%	
Communist	Don Gamache	215	4.54%	
Total valid votes		4,732		
Rejected, spoiled and declined		12		
Electors / Turnout		7,027	67.51%	-7.17%
Social Credit hold		Swing		+7.75%

1967 Alberta general election
Party	Candidate	Votes	%	±%
Social Credit	Raymond Reierson	2,275	44.41%	-16.64%
Liberal	Armand Lamothe	1,489	29.07%	+0.27%
New Democratic	Pierre M. Vallee	788	15.38%	+9.78%
Independent PC	Leroy P. Christensen	571	11.15%	
Total valid votes		5,123		
Rejected, spoiled and declined		14		
Electors / Turnout		7,512	68.38%	+0.87%
Social Credit hold		Swing		-8.46%

=== 1970s ===
1971 Alberta general election
Party	Candidate	Votes	%	±%
Progressive Conservative	Mick Fluker	2,661	45.81%	+34.66%
Social Credit	Raymond Reierson	2,041	35.14%	-9.27%
New Democratic	Laurence J. Dubois	898	15.46%	+0.08%
Liberal	Lawrence P. Coutu	209	3.60%	-25.47%
Total valid votes		5,809		
Rejected, spoiled and declined		11		
Electors / Turnout		7,720	75.39%	+7.01%
Progressive Conservative gain from Social Credit		Swing		+21.97%

1975 Alberta general election
Party	Candidate	Votes	%	±%
Progressive Conservative	Mick Fluker	2,912	57.27%	+11.46%
Social Credit	John Hull	848	16.68%	-18.46%
New Democratic	Pierre Vallee	764	15.02%	-0.44%
Liberal	Roland Genereux	561	11.03%	+7.43%
Total valid votes		5,085		
Rejected, spoiled and declined		19		
Electors / Turnout		7,899	64.62%	-10.77%
Progressive Conservative hold		Swing		+14.96%

1979 Alberta general election
Party	Candidate	Votes	%	±%
Progressive Conservative	Charles Anderson	3,173	46.47%	-10.80%
New Democratic	Laurent Dubois	2,854	41.80%	+26.78%
Social Credit	John Hull	582	8.52%	-8.16%
Liberal	Orest Boyko	219	3.21%	-7.82%
Total valid votes		6,828		
Rejected, spoiled and declined		31		
Electors / Turnout		9,452	72.57%	+7.95
Progressive Conservative hold		Swing		-18.79%

=== 1980s ===
1982 Alberta general election
Party	Candidate	Votes	%	±%
Progressive Conservative	John Drobot	4,269	56.26%	+9.79%
New Democratic	Laurent Dubois	2,872	37.85%	-3.95%
Western Canada Concept	Iris Bourne	447	5.89%	
Total valid votes		7,588		
Rejected, spoiled and declined		39		
Electors / Turnout		10,194	74.82%	+2.25%
Progressive Conservative hold		Swing		+6.87%

1986 Alberta general election
Party	Candidate	Votes	%	±%
Progressive Conservative	John Drobot	3,018	47.98%	-8.28%
New Democratic	Martin Naundorf	1,429	22.72%	-15.13%
Representative	Roland Rocque	1,380	21.94%	
Liberal	George Michaud	463	7.36%	
Total valid votes		6,290		
Rejected, spoiled and declined		21		
Electors / Turnout		10,760	58.65%	-16.17%
Progressive Conservative hold		Swing		+3.43%

1989 Alberta general election
Party	Candidate	Votes	%	±%
Progressive Conservative	John Drobot	2,931	46.09%	-1.89%
Liberal	Paul Langevin	2,304	36.23%	+28.87%
New Democratic	Victor Chrapko	1,124	17.68%	-5.04%
Total valid votes		6,359		
Rejected, spoiled and declined		19		
Electors / Turnout		10,437	61.11%	+2.46%
Progressive Conservative hold		Swing		-15.38%

== Plebiscite results ==
=== 1957 liquor plebiscite ===
1957 Alberta liquor plebiscite results: St. Paul
Question A: Do you approve additional types of outlets for the sale of beer, wine and spirituous liquor subject to a local vote?
Ballot choice	Votes	%
Yes	1,321	58.40%
No	941	41.60%
Total votes	2,262	100%
Rejected, spoiled and declined	18	
6,080 eligible electors, turnout 37.50%

On October 30, 1957, a stand-alone plebiscite was held province wide in all 50 of the then current provincial electoral districts in Alberta. The government decided to consult Alberta voters to decide on liquor sales and mixed drinking after a divisive debate in the Legislature. The plebiscite was intended to deal with the growing demand for reforming antiquated liquor control laws.

The plebiscite was conducted in two parts. Question A asked in all districts, asked the voters if the sale of liquor should be expanded in Alberta, while Question B asked in a handful of districts within the corporate limits of Calgary and Edmonton asked if men and woman were allowed to drink together in establishments.

Province wide Question A of the plebiscite passed in 33 of the 50 districts while Question B passed in all five districts. St. Paul voted in favour of the proposal by a solid majority. Voter turnout in the district was abysmal falling well under the province wide average of 46%.

Official district returns were released to the public on December 31, 1957. The Social Credit government in power at the time did not considered the results binding. However the results of the vote led the government to repeal all existing liquor legislation and introduce an entirely new Liquor Act.

Municipal districts lying inside electoral districts that voted against the Plebiscite were designated Local Option Zones by the Alberta Liquor Control Board and considered effective dry zones, business owners that wanted a licence had to petition for a binding municipal plebiscite in order to be granted a licence.

== See also ==
- List of Alberta provincial electoral districts
- Canadian provincial electoral districts
- St. Paul, a town in east-central Alberta
